= List of Chinese by net worth =

Annual ranking of Chinese billionaires by net worth by Forbes magazine

The following are partial lists of the Forbes list of Chinese billionaires (converted into USD) and is based on an annual assessment of wealth and assets compiled and published by Forbes magazine in 2022. In 2022, China had 607 billionaires which put the country second in the world, after the United States (735).

Current richest Chinese billionaire is Zhong Shanshan, ranked as the eighth wealthiest man in the world as of March 11, 2022.

== 2022 Chinese billionaires top 100 list ==
The hundred entrepreneurs billionaires are listed as follows, including their China (mainland) rank (C#) and world rank (W#), citizenship, age, net worth, and source of wealth:

С#	W#	Name	Age (y.o.)	Net worth (billions of USD)	Source of wealth	Ref.
1	17	Zhong Shanshan	78–79	▼65.7 -US$3.2B	The chair of Nongfu Spring	
2	25	Zhang Yiming	43	▲50 +US$14.4B	The developer of TikTok	
3	34	Ma Huateng	55	▼37.2 -US$28.6B	The chair of Tencent	
4	49	He Xiangjian	84	▼28.3 -US$9.4B	Co-founder of Midea Group	
5	55	William Ding	55	▼25.2 -US$7.8B	The CEO of NetEase	
6	56	Wang Wei	55–56	▼24.3 -US$14.7B	The chair of S.F. Holding	
7	59	Qin Yinglin	59–60	▼24.1 -US$8.9B	The chair of Muyuan Foodstuff	
8	62	Li Shufu	63	▲23.7 +US$4B	The chair of Geely	
9	67	Jack Ma	63	▼22.8 -US$25.6B	The co-founder of Alibaba Group	
10	79	Wang Ning	44-45	▲20.3 +US$7.4B	Founder of Pop Mart	
11	82	Pang Kang	69–70	▼19.6 -US$6.8B	The chairman of Foshan Haitian Flavouring & Food Co	
12	83	Wang Chuanfu	58–59	▲19.5 +US$3.2B	The co-founder of BYD Auto	
13	85	Yang Huiyan & family	43–44	▼18.7 -US$10.9B	Owns 57 % of Country Garden's stakes	
14	88	Fan Hongwei & family	58–59	18.2	Hengli Group	
15	91	Jiang Rensheng	72–73	▼17.7 -US$6.7B	The founder of Foshan Haitian Flavouring & Food Co	
16	91	Wang Wenyin	57–58	▲17.7 +US$4.5B	The chairman of Amer International Group	
17	99	Sun Piaoyang	67–68	▼17.1 -US$1.8B	The head of Jiangsu Hengrui Medicine	
18	100	Luo Liguo	69–70	▲17.1 +US$12.8B	The chair of Hoshine Silicon Industry	
19	114	Lu Xiangyang	62–63	▲15.7 +US$6.6B	Automobiles, batteries	
20	116	Wei Jianjun	61–62	15.5	The head of Great Wall Motor	
21	119	Wu Yajun	61–62	▼15.3 -US$3B	Cofounder of Longfor Properties	
22	126	Dang Yanbao	52–53	▲15.3 +US$2.1B	Coal	
23	134	Liu Hanyuan	61–62	▲13.65 +US$3.35B	Agribusiness	
24	138	Liu Yongxing	77–78	▲13.65 +US$6.7B	Diversified	
25	138	Wang Jianlin	71–72	▼13.2 -US$1.6B	Real estate	
26	142	Li Zhenguo & family	57–58	▲12.9 +US$2.4B	Solar wafers and modules	
27	144	Zhang Zhidong	53–54	▼12.8 -US$10.6B	Internet media	
28	146	Chen Bang	60–61	▼12.7 -US$5.2B	Hospitals	
29	146	Pei Zhenhua	66–67	▲12.5 +US$5B	Batteries	
30	154	Lin Jianhua & family	63–64	▲12.1 +US$6.2B	Solar panel components	
31	163	Lei Jun	55–56	▼11.7 -US$11.3B	Smartphones	
32	173	Colin Huang	46	▼11.3 -US$44B	E-commerce	
33	173	Jin Baofang	69–70	▲11.3 +US$7.4B	Solar panels	
34	179	Wang Xing	47	▼11 -US$15.1B	E-commerce	
35	188	Richard Liu	47	▼10.5 -US$11.9B	E-commerce	
36	192	Shuirong Li	68–69	▲10.3 +US$8.1B	Petrochemicals	
37	197	Yu Renrong	59–60	▼10 -US$2.3B	Semiconductors	
38	201	Qi Shi	55–56	▼9.9 -US$0.5B	Financial information	
39	206	Wang Laisheng	60–61	▼9.8 -US$1B	Electronics components	
40	214	Wang Laichun	55–56	▼9.5 -US$1.2B	Electronics components	
41	218	Zheng Shuliang & family	79–80	▲9.4 +US$0.8B	Aluminum products	
42	220	Cao Renxian	56–57	▲9.3 +US$4B	Photovoltaic equipment	
43	223	Liu Yonghao	73–74	▼9.1 -US$3B	Agribusiness	
44	235	Hui Ka Yan	68	▼8.8 -US$18.9B	Real estate	
45	235	Zong Qinghou	80–81	8.8	Beverages	
46	241	Cai Kui	63–64	▼8.7 -US$1.7B	Real estate	
47	241	Gao Jifan	60–61	▲8.7 +US$6.3B	Solar equipment	
48	246	Wang Liping	60–61	▼8.8 -US$4.5B	Solar equipment	
49	254	Liu Jincheng	60–61	▼8.4 -US$0.3B	Lithium batteries	
50	254	Ma Jianrong & family	60–61	▼8.4 -US$4.1B	Textiles	
51	275	Yao Liangsong	60–61	▼8.1 -US$1.5B	Furniture	
52	275	Zhong Huijuan	64–65	▼8.1 -US$11.6B	Pharmaceuticals	
53	296	Ding Shizhong	55–56	▼7.8 -US$1.6B	Sports apparel	
54	296	Liang Wengen	68–69	▼7.8 -US$6.3B	Construction equipment	
55	304	Ding Shijia	61–62	▼7.7 -US$1.6B	Sports apparel	
56	304	Xu Shihui	67–68	▼7.7 -US$1B	Snacks, beverages	
57	336	Qian Dongqi & family	67–68	▲7.1 +US$1B	Home-cleaning robots	
58	343	Deng Weiming	56–57	▲7 +US$4.2B	Battery component	
59	343	Robin Li	56–57	▼7 -US$7.7B	Internet search	
60	350	Jiang Bin	58–59	▲6.9 +US$0.7B	Acoustic components	
61	386	Chen Jianhua	58–59	▼6.5 -US$4.1B	Chemicals	
62	386	Ruan Hongliang & family	64–65	▲6.5 +US$0.8B	Glass	
63	398	Cheng Xue	55–56	▼6.4 -US$2.3B	Soy sauce	
64	398	Jiang Weiping	70–71	▲6.4 +US$2.3B	Chemicals	
65	398	Li Xiaohua & family	70–71	▲6.3 +US$3.5B	Chemicals	
66	403	Miao Hangen	60–61	▲6.3 +US$1.8B	Textiles	
67	418	Lin Li	61–62	▲6.1 +US$1.2B	Investments	
68	418	Zhao Yan	58–59	▼7.6 -US$1.5B	Biotech	
69	431	Jian Jun	61–62	▲5.9 +US$0.3B	Biomedical products	
70	460	Tse Ping	73–74	▼5.7 -US$3.2B	Biotech	
71	471	Xu Jinfu	61–62	▲5.6 +US$2.8B	Chemicals	
72	490	Chen Zhiping	49–50	▼5.4 -US$10.5B	E-cigarettes	
73	490	Li Chunan	66–67	▼5.4 -US$0.4B	Renewable energy	
74	490	Lin Muqin & family	61–62	5.4	Beverages	
75	490	Wang Wenjing	60–61	▼5.4 -US$1.2B	Business software	
76	490	Chris Xu	41–42	5.4	E-commerce	
77	509	Shen Guojun	62–63	5.3	Retail	
78	523	Chen Fashu	64–65	▼5.2 -US$0.7B	Investments	
79	523	Li Liangbin	57–58	▲5.2 +US$1.5B	Lithum	
80	523	Liang Feng	56–57	▲5.2 +US$1.5B	Manufacturing	
81	523	You Xiaoping	67–68	▼5.2 -US$1.1B	Chemicals, spandex	
82	536	Chan Laiwa & family	84–85	▼5.1 -US$0.7B	Real estate	
83	536	Wang Junshi & family	76–77	▲5.1 +US$3.3B	Solar investments	
84	536	Wang Yanqing & family	58–59	▲5.1 +US$0.9B	Electrical equipment	
85	552	Wei Fang	51–52	▲5 +US$0.8B	Steel	
86	552	Xiao Yongming	60–61	▲5 +US$3.5B	Fertilizer	
87	552	Zhang Tao	52–53	▼5 -US$7.5B	E-commerce	
88	586	Hu Baifan	62–63	▲4.8 +US$0.3B	Pharmaceuticals	
89	586	Leng Youbin	56–57	▼4.8 -US$5.8B	Infant formula	
90	586	Frank Wang	44–45	4.8	Drones	
91	586	Wang Junlin	62–63	▼4.8 -US$1.5B	Liquor	
92	586	Yang Shaopeng	67–68	▲4.8 +US$1.2B	Shipping	
93	601	Chu Mang Yee & family	65–66	▼4.7 -US$1.2B	Real estate	
94	601	Lai Meisong	54–55	▼4.7 -US$2.6B	Package delivery	
95	601	Yu Yong	64–65	▼4.7 -US$0.6B	Mining	
96	622	Lin Xiucheng & family	69–70	▼4.6 -US$0.4B	Electronics	
97	622	Zhu Baoguo	63–64	▲4.6 +US$0.1B	Pharmaceuticals	
98	637	Guo Guangchang	58–59	▼4.5 -US$2.4B	Conglomerate	
99	637	Xie Liangzhi	59–60	▲4.5 -US$2.4B	Biotech	
100	637	Zhang Hejun	N/A	4.5	Electronics	

== See also ==
- Forbes list of billionaires
- Hurun Report
- List of countries by the number of billionaires
- List of wealthiest families
