= Shijia =

Shijia is a lemma in the Chinese language and may refer to:

== People ==
- Ding Shijia (世家, Shìjiā), entrepreneur from China
- Eugenia Shi-Chia Chang (世嘉; Shìjiā), Member of Parliament of the Inkatha Freedom Party in the National Assembly of the Republic of South Africa
- Gong Shijia (诗嘉, Shījiā), singer from Singapore
- Jin Shijia (世佳; Shìjiā), actor and swimmer from China
- Li Shijia (诗佳; Shījiā), artistic gymnast from China
- Lu Shijia (士嘉; Shìjiā), physicist and aerospace engineer from China
- Wang Shijia (施佳, Shījiā), swimmer from China

== Concepts ==
- Annona squamosa (釋迦, Shìjiā), fruit name used in Taiwan
- Shakya (释迦, Shìjiā), ancient tribe
- Sakyamuni (释迦, Shìjiā), name for the Buddha

== Places ==
- Shijia Town (石家镇), Qianjiang, Chongqing, China
- Shijia Town (史家镇), Shizhong, Neijiang, Sichuan Province, China
- Shijia Township (disambiguation)
- Shijia Village (十甲村), Cuiping Subdistrict, Qixia, Yantai, Shandong Province, China
- Shijia Village (石甲村), Lejiang, Longsheng Various Nationalities Autonomous County, Guangxi, China
- Shijia Village (石佳村), Yonghe, Liuyang, Changsha, Hunan Province, China
- Shijia Village (石家村), Yunhuqiao, Xiangtan, Hunan Province, China
- Shijia Village (实佳村), Hukeng, Yongding, Longyan, Fujian Province, China
- Shijia Village (施家村), Lucao, Chiayi, Taiwan
- Shihjia metro station, Kaohsiung Metro, Taiwan
