= Cuiping Subdistrict =

Cuiping Subdistrict may refer to:

- Cuiping Subdistrict, Dazhou, Sichuan, China
- Cuiping Subdistrict, Qixia, Shandong, China

== See also ==
- Cuiping District, Yibin, Sichuan, China
- Cuipingshan Subdistrict, Xuzhou, Jiangsu, China
