= Qin Yinglin =

Chinese billionaire, pig breeder

- 秦英林
- Born: 1965 (age 60–61); Neixiang County, Nanyang, Henan, China
- Education: Henan Agricultural University
- Occupations: Founder and Chair of Muyuan Foodstuff (牧原食品)
- Spouse: Qian Ying (钱瑛)

Qin Yinglin (Chinese: 秦英林; pinyin: Qín Yīnglín, born 1965) is a Chinese agriculture tycoon, billionaire, Communist Party member, and the world's richest farmer. He is the Chair and president of the pig farming company Muyuan Foodstuff and is one of the richest people in China. According to Bloomberg Billionaires Index, his net worth was estimated at US$14.9 billion as of September 2023. Forbes wrote that he earned his wealth as "the country's largest pig breeder in the world's biggest pork market".

== Early life ==
Qin (pronounced Chin) was born in 1965 in Hexi Village, Mashankou Town, Neixiang County, Nanyang, Henan. He grew up in poverty.

In 1982, when Qin was in high school, his father saved up money and bought 20 pigs, but all but one died. This motivated Qin to study pig farming at university, so that he could help people in his village earn money raising pigs. In 1985 he was accepted to Henan Agricultural University.

== Career ==
In 1989, at age 24, Qin Yinglin graduated with a degree in animal husbandry and began working at Nanyang Food Company. While working there he met his wife, Qian Ying, who studied veterinary science at Zhengzhou College of Animal Husbandry Engineering (now Henan University of Animal Husbandry and Economy). In 1992, after three years at Nanyang Food Company, Qin quit his "iron rice bowl" job, and he and Qian moved back to Qin's hometown to start a business in the pork industry. They started out with just 22 pigs.

The operation grew rapidly. By 1994 they had 2,000 pigs, and by 1997 they had 10,000. In 2000 Qin founded Muyuan Farming (牧原养殖), the company that would eventually become Muyuan Foodstuff. In 2010, the company received an International Finance Corporation loan and investment. By 2013, Muyuan Foodstuff Ltd. had two wholly owned subsidiaries and one participating company, and was raising more than one million pigs for slaughter per year. On 28 January 2014, Muyuan stock (002714.SZ) started trading on the Shenzhen Stock Exchange.

Muyuan's stock price rose significantly when pork prices increased due to the African swine fever outbreak in 2019 and the COVID-19 pandemic in 2020. During the swine fever crisis, Muyuan was able to thrive because it owns more of its own facilities than competitors, allowing it to better control the spread of disease. Qin said that the swine fever outbreak "brings both benefit and harm" and that "the epidemic will force the weaker companies and farmers to completely withdraw but it will be an opportunity for profit and development for the stronger enterprises." Amid the crisis, Muyuan worked to continue increasing the number of pigs it slaughters and to increase automation in its pig houses.

Muyuan Foodstuff is the largest pig breeder in China. As of 2019, the company slaughters five million pigs a year. Qin Yinglin serves as the company's president and chair.

=== Wealth ===
According to the 2015 Forbes list of Chinese billionaires, Qin Yinglin was the richest person in Henan and the 67th richest person in China; he and his wife had a net worth of RMB 17.15 billion. According to Hurun the same year, he had a net worth of RMB 20.5 billion, making him the 98th richest person in China. By 2019, Qin's net worth had risen to over 100 billion yuan, bringing him to 15th on the Hurun list and making him the only local entrepreneur in Henan worth 100 billion yuan; this increase came as Muyuan Foodstuff was doing well due to the rising price of pork. On the 2019 Forbes list of Chinese billionaires, his family's wealth was estimated at 117.38 billion RMB, ninth on the list. He was the second Henanese entrepreneur on the list, after Xu Jiayin. His wealth jumped again in 2020 as pork prices rose due to African swine fever.

Qin is the richest farmer in the world and owns 883 million shares of Muyuan stock, 40.06% of the company. Qin's wife Qian Ying is also a billionaire, and together they own a majority stake in Muyuan. His son Qin Muyuan (秦牧原) is a vice-president at Muyuan Group.

== Titles ==
- Visiting professor at China Plan Institute (中国策划学院)
- Managing director of China CYZF Promotio Association (中国创业致富促进会)
- Communist Party member
- Delegate to the 2002 Henan Provincial People's Congress
- Part-time professor at Henan Agricultural University, appointed in 2007
- Delegate to the 13th National People's Congress
- Member of the board of directors of Westlake University

== Philanthropy ==
On 15 February 2019, Qin donated stock worth RMB 100 million to the Westlake Education Foundation (西湖教育基金会).

In April 2020, Qin made another donation to the Westlake Education Foundation, of stock worth RMB 800 million, for basic research, cutting-edge technological innovation, personnel development, and teaching at Westlake University.

== Awards ==
In 1997, Qin was recognized as one of ten outstanding young farmers in China. In 1999, he received a Youth May 4 Pacesetter award. And in 2006, he was named a national exceptional worker in the field of animal husbandry.
