= Famitinib =

Chemical compound

Legal status
- Legal status: Investigational

Identifiers
- IUPAC name: 5-[2-(Diethylamino)ethyl]-2-[(Z)-(5-fluoro-2-oxo-1H-indol-3-ylidene)methyl]-3-methyl-6,7-dihydro-1H-pyrrolo[3,2-c]pyridin-4-one
- CAS Number: 1044040-56-3
- PubChem CID: 16662431
- IUPHAR/BPS: 7886
- DrugBank: DB11741
- ChemSpider: 17595500
- UNII: 768FW21J3L
- ChEMBL: ChEMBL1278146
- CompTox Dashboard (EPA): DTXSID301358976

Chemical and physical data
- Formula: C_{23}H_{27}FN_{4}O_{2}
- Molar mass: 410.493 g·mol^{−1}
- 3D model (JSmol): Interactive image
- SMILES: CCN(CC)CCN1CCC2=C(C1=O)C(=C(N2)/C=C\3/C4=C(C=CC(=C4)F)NC3=O)C
- InChI: InChI=1S/C23H27FN4O2/c1-4-27(5-2)10-11-28-9-8-19-21(23(28)30)14(3)20(25-19)13-17-16-12-15(24)6-7-18(16)26-22(17)29/h6-7,12-13,25H,4-5,8-11H2,1-3H3,(H,26,29)/b17-13-; Key:GKEYKDOLBLYGRB-LGMDPLHJSA-N

Famitinib is a tyrosine kinase receptor inhibitor developed by Jiangsu Hengrui for a variety of cancers. In China, in May 2025 famitinib was conditionally approved for use in combination with camrelizumab for the treatment of recurrent or metastatic cervical cancer in patients who have failed prior platinum-based chemotherapy and have not received prior bevacizumab.
