= Shijia Township =

Shijia Township, may refer to:

- Shijia Township, Shizhu County, a township in Shizhu Tujia Autonomous County, Chongqing, China.
- Shijia Township, Fuchuan County, a township in Fuchuan Yao Autonomous County, Guangxi, China.
