= Zhang Dejun =

Zhang Dejun may refer to:

- Zhang Hejun, Chinese businessman
- Wang Ji'en (died 999), Chinese eunuch and a military general during the Zhou and Song dynasties
