= CMBC =

CMBC may refer to:

- Canadian Mennonite Bible College, one of three colleges that merged in 1990 to form Canadian Mennonite University
- Coast Mountain Bus Company, the main contract operator for bus transit services in Metro Vancouver, British Columbia, Canada
- China Minsheng Bank, China Minsheng Banking Corporation Limited 中国民生银行股份有限公司
