= Wan'an Subdistrict, Shizhu County =

Wan'an Subdistrict 万安街道
- Subdistrict
- Location in Chongqing
- Coordinates: 29.9972°N 108.1165°E
- Country: People's Republic of China
- Direct-administered municipality: Chongqing
- Autonomous county: Shizhu Tujia Autonomous County
- Time zone: UTC+8 (China Standard)

Wan'an Subdistrict (simplified Chinese: 万安街道; traditional Chinese: 萬安街道; pinyin: Wàn'ān Jiēdào) is a subdistrict in Shizhu Tujia Autonomous County, Chongqing, China. As of 2018, it has 5 residential communities and 5 villages under its administration.

== See also ==
- List of township-level divisions of Chongqing
