= Daqiao Township, Neixiang County =

Daqiao Township 大桥乡
- Township
- Location in Henan
- Coordinates: 32°59′27″N 111°52′18″E
- Country: People's Republic of China
- Province: Henan
- Prefecture-level city: Nanyang
- County: Neixiang
- Village-level divisions: 15 villages
- Elevation: 161 m (528 ft)
- Time zone: UTC+8 (China Standard)
- Area code: 0377

Daqiao Township (simplified Chinese: 大桥乡; traditional Chinese: 大橋鄉; pinyin: Dàqiáo Xiāng; lit. 'great or large bridge') is a township of Neixiang County in southwestern Henan province, China, located about 6 kilometres (3.7 mi) south-southeast of the county seat. As of 2018, it has 15 villages under its administration.

== See also ==
- List of township-level divisions of Henan
