= JA Solar Holdings =

Chinese solar energy company

JA Solar Holdings Co., Ltd.
- Native name: 晶澳太陽能控股公司
- Type: Public
- Traded as: SZSE: 002459; Nasdaq: JASO
- Industry: Semiconductor
- Founded: 2005; 21 years ago as JingAo Solar Co. Ltd.
- Headquarters: Beijing, China
- Key people: Jin Baofang (executive chairman); Peng Fang (CEO)
- Products: Photovoltaic solar cells
- Website: www.jasolar.com

JA Solar Holdings Co., Ltd. is a solar development company founded in Yangpu district, Shanghai. They design, develop, manufacture and sell solar cell and solar module products and are based in the People’s Republic of China. The company is also engaged in the manufacturing and sales of monocrystalline and multicrystalline solar cells. It sells its products primarily through a team of sales and marketing personnel to solar module manufacturers, who assemble and integrate its solar cells into modules and systems that convert sunlight into electricity. It also manufactures a variety of standard and specialty solar modules. JA Solar Holdings sells its products to customers in 178 countries and regions, including Germany, Italy, Sweden, Spain, South Korea, and the United States. The company was founded in 2005 and is based in Beijing, in the People’s Republic of China. In December 2009 investors began to notice the growing market share of JA Solar which was fueled by a large subsidy from the Chinese government.

In February 2018 the company signed a deal with Manitu Solar for Manitu to distribute JA Solar's solar modules to markets in Eastern Europe.

A 2023 report by Sheffield Hallam University stated that JA Solar had "very high" exposure to production in Xinjiang involving forced Uyghur labor. In June 2026, the US Department of Defense added the company to a list of Chinese military-linked companies.

== See also ==
- Solar power in China
