= Liu Yonghao =

Chinese businessman (born 1952)

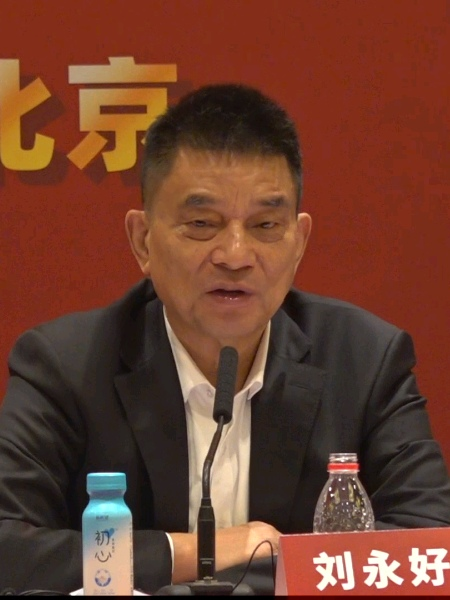
- Liu in 2024
- Born: Xinjin District, China
- Occupation: Businessman

Liu Yonghao (Chinese: 刘永好; born 1952) is a businessman in agribusiness in China. He is the founder and chairman of New Hope, the biggest animal feed producer in China. He is also involved in banking. As of 2019, He was ranked the 19th richest in China by Forbes in China.

== Early life ==
Liu Yonghao started his career teaching at a technical school. He and his three brothers quit their jobs in the government in 1982 to invest in breeding quails and chickens to sell to farmers in Sichuan province.

In 1992, Liu and his brothers entered the animal feed business and founded the Hope Group. By 2010, it was the largest animal feed group in China.

== Career ==
He helped established the China Minsheng Bank, and in 2011 he owned 7 percent of that bank's shares. Liu Yonghao is also one of the major shareholders of Huaxia Medical, a management institution of Putian hospitals.

On January 12, 1996, China Minsheng Bank (Shanghai Stock Exchange: 600016) was officially listed in Beijing, with Shuping as the chairman and Liu Yonghao as the vice chairman. In 1999, Liu Yonghao became the largest shareholder of Minsheng Bank.

In 2011, Liu was vice-chairman of China Minsheng Bank and chairman of the New Hope Group. That year, the 2010 Forbes list of the 400 Chinese ranked him at Number 21, with his wealth estimated at $3 billion.

In the same year, he told the Financial Times that he was focused on creating agricultural co-operatives to help peasant farmers industrialize their plots, and his company had set up 100 of them, and also set up underwriting companies to help peasant farmers get loans.

In 2012, Fortune chose him as one of their 15 business people who had changed China.

In 2013, his daughter Liu Chang succeeded him as chairman of New Hope Liuhe, one of China's largest agribusiness firms.

He is a member of the Sino-Australia 100-Year Agricultural and Food Safety Partnership (ASA 100).

In 2021, Forbes estimated his net worth to be $12.1 billion.

== Personal life ==
His older brother is Liu Yongxing. He has one daughter.

== See also ==
- List of Chinese by net worth
