= Zhong Huijuan =

Chinese pharmaceutical executive

- 钟慧娟
- Born: April 1961 (age 65); Lianyungang, Jiangsu, China
- Education: Jiangsu Normal University (Bachelor's), Nanjing University (Master's)
- Occupations: Chair and CEO of Hansoh Pharmaceutical
- Spouse: Sun Piaoyang
- Children: Sun Yuan

Zhong Huijuan
- Traditional Chinese: 鐘慧娟
- Simplified Chinese: 钟慧娟
Transcriptions
Standard Mandarin
- Hanyu Pinyin: Zhōng Huìjuān

Zhong Huijuan (Chinese: 钟慧娟; born April 1961) is a Chinese pharmaceutical executive, billionaire, and the world's richest self-made woman. She is the founder, CEO, and chair of Hansoh Pharmaceutical, which is headquartered in Lianyungang and is traded on the Hong Kong Stock Exchange. She is the company's majority shareholder, with a 66% stake. In 2021, she was the world's 89th richest person according to Forbes, with a net worth of US$19.7 billion.

== Education and career ==
Born in Lianyungang, Jiangsu Province, Zhong studied chemistry at Jiangsu Normal University and graduated in July 1982. She then worked as a chemistry teacher at Yan'an Middle School in Lianyungang. At the same time, Sun Piaoyang, her husband, was the manager of a state-owned pharmaceutical factory in the same city. (That factory would eventually become Jiangsu Hengrui Medicine, the largest listed pharmaceutical company in China.)

In 1995, Sun and an investor from Hong Kong started a new pharmaceutical company, which would become Hansoh Pharmaceutical Group (豪森药业, later restructured as 翰森制药集团). But because Sun still worked at the state-owned factory, he found himself too busy to manage the new company. This was Zhong's opportunity to enter the pharmaceutical industry: she left her job as a teacher to run the fledgling company as a founder.

The company had only about ten employees at first, but it grew rapidly, and by 1997 it had US$4.5 million in revenue. To help the company grow, Zhong reinvested 5% of sales revenue into R&D, developing products including antibiotics, cancer treatments, and psychotropic, endocrine, and gastrointestinal drugs. The R&D budget later grew to nearly 10% of revenue, an unusually high level for a Chinese pharmaceutical company.

Hansoh Pharmaceutical had its initial public offering on the Hong Kong Stock Exchange in June 2019 and raised US$1 billion. This made Zhong the richest self-made woman in Asia, with a net worth of US$10.5 billion (greater than her husband's fortune of US$9.4 billion).

By 2019, the company had become the largest producer of psychotropic drugs in China. Zhong owns 66% of the company through the Sunrise Trust, registered in the British Virgin Islands. Her wealth grew significantly in 2020 amid the COVID-19 pandemic. In that year, she was the world's 9th richest woman according to Forbes, as well as the 20th richest person in China according to Hurun.

== Recognition ==
In 2007, Zhong received the March 8th Red Banner Bearer award (三八红旗手), which recognizes outstanding working women in China.

== Personal life ==
Zhong's husband, Sun Piaoyang, is also a billionaire and is the chair of Jiangsu Hengrui Medicine. Zhong and Sun are relatively private and rarely give interviews. Their daughter Sun Yuan (孙远) is Hansoh Pharmaceutical's executive director and also owns a stake in the company.

Zhong lives in Shanghai.

== See also ==
- List of female billionaires
- Ernesto Bertarelli
