= Wens Foodstuff Group =

Chinese pork company

- Industry: Food
- Headquarters: China
- Products: Pork

Wens Foodstuff Group (simplified Chinese: 温氏食品集团; traditional Chinese: 溫氏食品集團; pinyin: Wēnshì Shípǐn Jítuán) is a Chinese food company specializing in pork production.

== Overview ==
Wens Foodstuff Group is a major pork producer. It is traded on the Shenzhen Stock Exchange (300498.SZ).

The company is also involved in the non-pork meat and dairy business.

== History ==
Wens Foodstuff Group, formerly known as Guangdong Wens Food Group, was founded in 1983.

In 2018 the company's 1.2 million sows produced 22.3 million hogs. In 2019 they were the largest pork producer in China.

Following the 2020 the African swine fever epidemic the company expanded aggressively building mega-farms with multistory pig barns. This growth was largely fueled by debt.

== See also ==
- Muyuan Foodstuff
