= Beijing Times =

Defunct newspaper based in Beijing, China

- Type: Daily newspaper
- Format: Print
- Owner: People's Daily
- Founded: 2001
- Ceased publication: 2016
- Language: Chinese
- Website: jinghua.cn

The Beijing Times (simplified Chinese: 京华时报; traditional Chinese: 京華時報; pinyin: Jīnghuá Shíbào) was a Chinese newspaper published in Beijing owned by the People's Daily. It ceased publication at the end of 2016.

== History ==
Beijing Times was launched in May 2001. When it started, Beijing Times had 12% of the Beijing newspaper market and its percentage increased afterwards. Tang Wenfang and Shanto Iyengar, authors of Political Communication China Media, described the paper as one of the "commercialized papers emerging in the early 2000s".

On April 10, 2013, the Beijing Times accused the company Nongfu Spring of intentionally not adopting Chinese national water standards and instead adopting the lower standards of Zhejiang province. In November 2013, the company accused the Beijing Times of defamation and filed a lawsuit in the Beijing Second Intermediate People's Court against the newspaper, demanding 60 million yuan (US$9.85 million).

In 2023, an unrelated pro–Chinese Communist Party news website also called the Beijing Times (beijingtimes.com) began publication. The news website has no identified human reporters, and the photos of its reporters appear AI-generated.
