= Brother Nut =

Chinese performance artist

Brother Nut is an internationally-known performance artist based in Beijing, China. He is known only by his pseudonym, 坚果兄弟, which is also sometimes translated in English as "Nut Brother." He was born in Shenzhen, Guangdong in 1981.

== Career ==
His best known work is 2015's "Project Dust," which consisted of the creation of a brick made entirely from particulate matter vacuumed out of heavily polluted Beijing city air. This project spotlighted Beijing's ongoing air pollution problems at a time when China sought to recast itself as an environmentally-aware nation. Project Dust received press coverage in the United States and Europe, as well as in Asian press. An online photo gallery is also maintained to summarize the activity of the project.

In 2016 Nut Brother was a speaker at the Enter the Anthropocene Creative Time Summit in Washington DC.

In 2018, he made headlines again with his project “Nongfu Spring Market” in which he exhibited 9000 bottles of polluted water from the village of Xiaohaotu, in Shaanxi. The bottled water was then exhibited in the form of a street market set up in the 798 Art District in Beijing. While the art show was shut down by authorities, the government also began investigations into the town's water pollution problems.

In 2020, he was profiled on the Al Jazeera documentary 101 East: China's Activist Artist, which showed him collecting toys from children in Baishizhou which would be used for an art work involving a giant game of grab (as in an arcade claw machine), which would highlight the eviction of families in the area.
