= Sanhe, Shizhu County =

Sanhe 三河镇
- Town
- Location in Chongqing
- Coordinates: 30°02′03″N 108°11′31″E
- Country: People's Republic of China
- Municipality: Chongqing
- Autonomous county: Shizhu
- Village-level divisions: 3 residential communities and 10 villages
- Elevation: 673 m (2,208 ft)
- Time zone: UTC+8 (China Standard)

Sanhe (Chinese: 三河; pinyin: Sānhé; lit. 'three rivers') is a town of west-central Shizhu Tujia Autonomous County in eastern Chongqing Municipality, People's Republic of China, located 8.4 kilometres (5.2 mi) northeast of the county seat as the crow flies. As of 2018, it has 3 residential communities and 10 villages under its administration.

== See also ==
- List of township-level divisions of Chongqing
