= Rezvilutamide =

Chemical compound

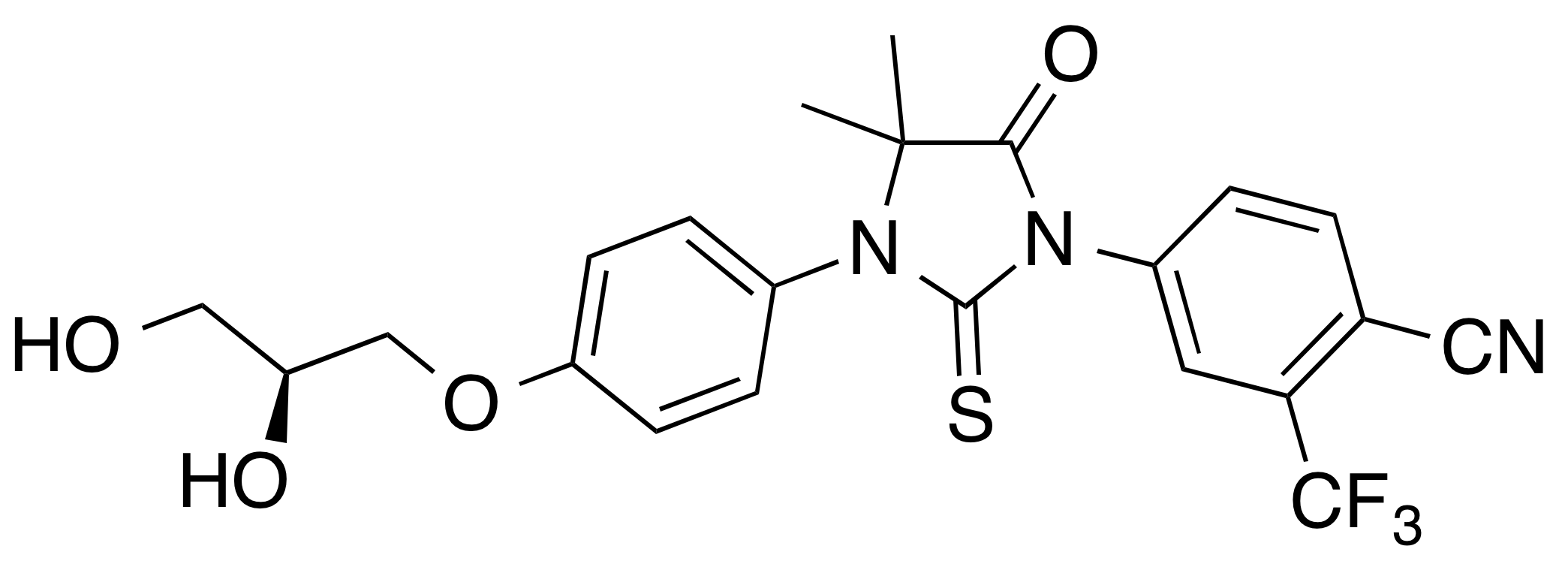

Clinical data
- Other names: SHR3680
- Drug class: Nonsteroidal antiandrogen
- ATC code: None

Identifiers
- IUPAC name: 4-[3-[4-[(2S)-2,3-dihydroxypropoxy]phenyl]-4,4-dimethyl-5-oxo-2-sulfanylideneimidazolidin-1-yl]-2-(trifluoromethyl)benzonitrile
- CAS Number: 1572045-62-5
- PubChem CID: 89995232
- UNII: 70FJN2AW22
- CompTox Dashboard (EPA): DTXSID001336581

Chemical and physical data
- Formula: C_{22}H_{20}F_{3}N_{3}O_{4}S
- Molar mass: 479.47 g·mol^{−1}
- 3D model (JSmol): Interactive image
- SMILES: CC1(C(=O)N(C(=S)N1C2=CC=C(C=C2)OC[C@H](CO)O)C3=CC(=C(C=C3)C#N)C(F)(F)F)C
- InChI: InChI=1S/C22H20F3N3O4S/c1-21(2)19(31)27(15-4-3-13(10-26)18(9-15)22(23,24)25)20(33)28(21)14-5-7-17(8-6-14)32-12-16(30)11-29/h3-9,16,29-30H,11-12H2,1-2H3/t16-/m0/s1; Key:KRBMOYIWQCZVHA-INIZCTEOSA-N

Rezvilutamide (INN), sold under the brand name Ariane, is a nonsteroidal antiandrogen which is approved for the treatment of prostate cancer in China and is or was under development for the treatment of breast cancer. It is a selective androgen receptor antagonist with reduced brain distribution compared to the structurally related nonsteroidal antiandrogen enzalutamide. The drug was developed by Jiangsu Hengrui Medicine. Other structural analogues of rezvilutamide that are also used as antiandrogens besides enzalutamide include apalutamide and proxalutamide.
