= Pang Kang =

Chinese billionaire

- Born: 1956 (age 69–70)
- Occupation: Businessman
- Title: Chairman, Foshan Haitian Flavouring & Food Co
- Spouse: Married

Pang Kang (Chinese: 庞康; born 1956) is a Chinese billionaire businessman, and the chairman of Foshan Haitian Flavouring & Food Co.

== Biography ==
Pang Kang was an executive of the collective Hai Tian Sauce Shop. In 1995, he contributed to the incorporation of the collective as a limited company, and became a shareholder with a $60K initial investment. The company became Foshan Haitian Flavoring & Food and was introduced on the Shanghai Stock Exchange in 2014.

== Fortune ==
In 2014, his fortune was estimated at US$2.5 billion. In 2018, his fortune grew by 60% to reach $7.2 billion, going from 68th to 35th in the China Rich List.

As of January 2021, Forbes estimated his net worth at $34.3 billion.

== Personal life ==
Pang does not have children.
