= Mashankou Town =

Mashankou Town 马山口镇
- Town
- Etymology: Literally "horse mountain pass"
- Location within Henan
- Country: China
- Province: Henan
- Prefecture-level city: Nanyang
- County: Neixiang
- Administrative division code: 41 13 25 103

Mashankou Town (simplified Chinese: 马山口镇; traditional Chinese: 馬山口鎮; pinyin: Mǎshānkǒu Zhèn) is a town in Neixiang County, Nanyang City, Henan Province, China.

== Administrative divisions ==
Mashankou Town includes the following administrative divisions:

Mashankou Community (马山口社区), Yangang Village (闫岗村), Ciyuan Village (茨园村), Yuegang Village (岳岗村), Dazhai Village (大寨村), Sishanmiao Village (寺山庙村), Anbei Village (庵北村), Hekou Village (河口村), Duluozhuang Village (杜洛庄村), Shimiao Village (石庙村), Zhumiao Village (朱庙村), Damogang Village (打磨岗村), Baimiao Village (白庙村), Sanchahe Village (三岔河村), Guandiping Village (关帝坪村), Huabei Village (花北村), Lijing Village (李井村), Wangchang Village (王场村), Tanghe Village (唐河村), Maping Village (马坪村), Xingshuping Village (杏树坪村), Hexi Village (河西村), Zhengwan Village (郑湾村), Fangang Village (樊岗村), and Laozhuang Village (老庄村).

== Notable people ==
- Qin Yinglin, pig farmer from Hexi Village
