= Jing Shuping =

Chinese banker and politician (1918–2009)

- Born: 7 July 1918; Shanghai, China
- Died: September 14, 2009 (aged 91); Beijing, China
- Education: St. John's University, Shanghai
- Occupation: Businessman
- Title: Founder of Minsheng Bank

Jing Shuping (Chinese: 经叔平, 7 July 1918 – September 14, 2009) was a Chinese businessman who founded Minsheng Bank, the first privately owned bank to open in the People's Republic of China, in 1996.

Jing Shuping graduated from Saint John's University in Shanghai in 1939. He was Chairman of the All-China Federation of Industry and Commerce and Vice Chairman of the Chinese People's Political Consultative Conference until 2002, and held the rank of a national leader of China. He also became a director within the China International Trust and Investment Corp, which is now known as the CITIC Group, the Chinese government's state-owned investment group.

Jing founded Minsheng Bank in 1996. He resigned as chairman of the bank in 2006 citing declining health. However, he remained the honorary chairman of the bank following his retirement. Additionally, Jing opened China's first law firm, consulting firm and accounting firm since the 1949 Chinese Communist Revolution.

Jing Shuping died on September 14, 2009, in Beijing at the age of 91.
