= Sun Piaoyang =

- 孙飘扬
- Born: 1958 (age 67–68); Jinhu County, Huai'an
- Education: China Pharmaceutical University, Nanjing University
- Occupation: Businessman
- Title: Chairman of Jiangsu Hengrui Medicine
- Spouse: Zhong Huijuan (钟慧娟)

Sun Piaoyang (Chinese: 孙飘扬; born 1958) is a Chinese pharmaceutical executive and billionaire, the chairman of Jiangsu Hengrui Medicine.

== Biography ==
Sun has a bachelor's degree from China Pharmaceutical University and a doctoral degree from Nanjing University.

After taking over the formerly state-led Jiangsu Hengrui Medicine in 1990, he steered the company into becoming one of China's largest producers of anti-infection and anti-cancer medicines.

Sun is married to Zhong Huijuan (钟慧娟, also a billionaire, with net worth of US$19.7 billion as of May 2021), chairwoman of the drugmaker Hansoh Pharmaceutical. They have one child, Sun Yuan (孙远).
