= Wu Yajun =

Chinese billionaire businesswoman (born 1964)

- Born: 1964 (age 61–62); Chongqing, China
- Education: Northwestern Polytechnical University
- Occupations: Businesswoman, philanthropist, former journalist
- Known for: World's richest self-made woman
- Title: Former Chairwoman, Longfor Properties
- Spouse: Cai Kui (div. 2012)
- Children: 1

Wu Yajun (Chinese: 吴亚军; pinyin: Wú Yàjūn; born 1964) is a Chinese billionaire businesswoman who was at one time the world's richest self-made woman. She is the co-founder, former chairwoman, and former CEO of Longfor Properties. From humble origins, she worked as a journalist and editor before moving into real estate in the 1990s, later investing in technology companies including Uber and Evernote.

As of April 2021, Wu has an estimated net worth of US$18.3 billion.

== Early life ==
Wu was born in Chongqing in 1964 to an ordinary family. She graduated from the Department of Navigation Engineering of the Northwestern Polytechnical University in 1984.

== Career ==
From 1984 to 1988, she worked at the Qianwei Meter Factory. From 1988 to 1993 she worked as a journalist and editor at the China Shirong News Agency.

In 1995 Wu and her former husband, businessman Cai Kui, founded Chongqing Zhongjianke Real Estate Co Ltd with an initial capital investment of 10 million yuan. The company was later renamed as Longfor Properties. The enterprise grew rapidly thereafter, expanding from her home in Chongqing to include major cities like Chengdu, Beijing, Shanghai, Changzhou and Dalian. She became alumni member of the Cheung Kong Graduate School of Business in 2007. Longfor Properties went public on the Hong Kong Stock Exchange (SEHK) in 2009; notable investors are Singapore's government, Ping An Insurance and Temasek Holdings.

Wu is the former chairwoman and former CEO of Longfor Properties.

== Wealth ==
Wu's wealth is managed by her family office, which was founded in 2013. Since inception, it has made investments in technology companies including Uber and Evernote.

She is the third-richest woman in China, and the 22nd-richest overall, according to the Hurun Report China Rich List 2013. In 2012, she was the richest woman in China, and fifth-richest person in the country. She lost that position to Yang Huiyan due to her divorce from Cai Kui. As of March 2013 she was the 299th-richest person in the world, and among the top 50 Power-women list by Forbes, with a net worth of US$4.4 billion. She was a delegate to the 11th and 12th National People's Congress (2008–2018) and has not served since. In 2014, she was listed as the 41st most powerful woman in the world by Forbes.

In March 2019, Barron's reported that, after a seven year gap, Wu was once again the world's richest self-made woman.

== Personal life ==
In 2012, Wu divorced her husband Cai Kui, thereby losing her status as richest woman in China to Yang Huiyan. Wu's stake in Longfor fell to 45%, with Cai Kui holding a 30% stake. She has one child.
