= Muyuan Foodstuff =

Chinese pork producer

- Traded as: CSI A50
- Industry: Food
- Products: Pork
- Number of employees: 137,000

Muyuan Foodstuff (Chinese: 牧原食品; pinyin: Mùyuán Shípǐn) is a Chinese food company specializing in pork production. As of 2023, Muyuan raises approximately 100 million and slaughters 63 million pigs per year. They operate the world's largest pig farm.

== History ==
Muyuan was founded by husband and wife Qin Yinglin and Qian Ying, who started their first farm in 1992. By 1994, they had 2,000 pigs, and by 1997 they had 10,000. In 2000, Qin founded Muyuan Farming (牧原养殖), the company that would eventually become Muyuan Foodstuff. In 2010, the company received an International Finance Corporation loan and investment. By 2013, Muyuan Foodstuff Ltd. had two wholly owned subsidiaries and one participating company, and was raising more than one million pigs for slaughter per year. On 28 January 2014, Muyuan stock (002714.SZ) started trading on the Shenzhen Stock Exchange. By 2019, they were the second largest pork producer in China after Wens Foodstuff Group.

In 2020, the African swine fever epidemic caused the global price of pork to rise and Muyuan's profits grew 1,413% in the first nine months of 2020. This cash allowed them to invest in a new generation of mega farms. During the swine fever crisis, Muyuan was able to thrive because it owns more of its own facilities than competitors, allowing it to better control the spread of disease.

In 2021, they were the world's leading sow producer.

After selling over 78 million pigs in 2025, the company completed a second listing on the Hong Kong Stock Exchange in February 2026, raising US$1.7 billion. The agenda for the coming years includes expansion into Southeast Asia (starting with neighboring Vietnam) and the establishment of purchasing teams in key grain and oilseed exporting countries such as Brazil to ensure stable supply.

== Facilities ==
Muyuan's pig farm near Nanyang is the world's largest. Its pig barns are multistory which allows for higher density. The farm is farrow-to-finish meaning that pigs taken from breeding to slaughter on-site. Production at this farm is targeted at 2.1 million pigs a year.
