= Zhong Shanshan =

Chinese business magnate and billionaire (born 1954)

- Born: 1954 (age 71–72); Hangzhou, China
- Occupations: Businessman; journalist
- Known for: Founding Nongfu Spring; Majority owner of Beijing Wantai Biological Pharmacy Enterprise

Zhong Shanshan (Chinese: 钟睒睒; pinyin: Zhōng Shǎnshǎn, born 1954) is a Chinese business magnate and billionaire. He is the founder and chairperson of the Nongfu Spring beverage company and majority owner of Beijing Wantai Biological Pharmacy Enterprise.

As of 2025, Zhong has a net worth of US$77.5 billion, and was ranked among the top 25 in the Bloomberg Billionaires Index. His wealth is derived mainly from his business stakes and interests in the Chinese beverage and pharmaceutical industries.

== Early life ==
Zhong was born in Hangzhou in 1954. He dropped out of primary school during the Cultural Revolution and found work in construction. Zhong was a journalist at the Zhejiang Daily before quitting his job in 1988 to start his own business. In 1988, Zhong moved to Hainan, an island off the coast of southern China. He sold mushrooms, prawns, and turtles during his time on the island. He then went on to work at the Wahaha beverage company as a sales agent, and sold healthcare supplements.

== Career ==
In 1996, Zhong founded a bottled water company in Hangzhou, which later became Nongfu Spring. In 1999, Nongfu Spring stopped removing natural minerals from its water. This was a savvy marketing move and greatly helped increase exposure to their target audience. It was popular in China, where distilled water was the norm at the time, despite many worrying about its health benefits, or lack thereof. Under Zhong's leadership, the company grew to be the largest bottled water maker in China, as well as one of the largest beverage companies in the world. The company beat out behemoths in the industry such as Coca-Cola, Watsons, and Pepsi to become the best-selling package beverage brand. Zhong took advantage of new technologies such as cloud computing and big data in order to gain a key advantage in understanding Nongfu Spring's customer base. This allowed for increased market expansion across the country and transformed it into a larger company. According to Nielsen research data, Nongfu Spring's natural water became the most popular bottled water in the country in 2012. Starting in 2012, Nongfu Spring was the number one seller of packaged beverages in China. It maintained this dominance for 8 consecutive years.

Nongfu Spring's initial public offering in September 2020 massively increased Zhong's wealth. It expanded his fortune from 18.9 billion dollars to over 50 billion dollars. This made him China's wealthiest or second-wealthiest person, according to Bloomberg and Forbes respectively. At the end of 2020, Forbes listed Zhong as Asia's wealthiest person. In January 2021, Forbes reported that the increasing share price of Nongfu Spring made him China's wealthiest person and the world's sixth wealthiest person, with a net worth of 95 billion dollars. However he was only shortly the wealthiest Asian but was overtaken by Mukesh Ambani of India. His rise came alongside a wave of wealth in China, where over 100 billionaires were minted in 2020, adding 0.5 trillion dollars to their wealth, collectively. However he lost over 30 billion US dollars and ranks 3rd in Asia's wealthiest behind Ambani and Gautam Adani, both Indians. By September 2020, Zhong owned a 75% stake in Beijing Wantai Biological Pharmacy. Wantai went public in April 2020, which increased Zhong's wealth and added to his fortune. As of January 2021, he owned 84.4% of Nongfu Spring and was the company's chairperson.

In 2024, Chinese nationalists unleashed a wave of online attacks targeting Zhong, accusing him of being insufficiently loyal to China because he allegedly showed a lack of respect to a deceased business rival known for his patriotism, and because his son holds a U.S. passport.

== Personal life ==
Despite his business success and immense wealth, Zhong maintains a low public profile, and has been called a "lone wolf" by Chinese media. He purchased an apartment in Xihu District, Hangzhou, where he primarily resides. Nongfu Spring's headquarters are also located in Xihu district.
