= Hansoh Pharmaceutical =

Chinese pharmaceutical company

Hansoh Pharmaceutical Group Company Limited
- Type: Public
- Traded as: SEHK: 3692
- Industry: Pharmaceutical
- Founded: 1995; 31 years ago
- Founder: Zhong Huijuan
- Headquarters: Shanghai, China
- Key people: Zhong Huijuan (CEO & Chairlady)
- Website: www.hspharm.com

Hansoh Pharmaceutical Group Company Limited (simplified Chinese: 翰森制药集团有限公司; traditional Chinese: 翰森製藥集團有限公司; pinyin: Hànsēn Zhìyào Jítuán Yǒuxiàn Gōngsī) is a pharmaceutical company that manufactures and sells various types of medicine in mainland China. It was founded in 1995 in Lianyungang, Jiangsu Province, China, by Zhong Huijuan, who is the company's chair. Zhong and her family own 66% of the company. It is the largest psychotropic drug producer in China.

Hansoh Pharmaceutical had an initial public offering on the main board of the Hong Kong Stock Exchange (SEHK: 3692) on 14 June 2019.

In August 2022, it was announced that the company's stock would be added to the Hang Seng Index.

== See also ==
- Jiangsu Hengrui Medicine
