= Wang Wenyin =

Chinese businessman

- Born: 1968 (age 57–58)
- Education: Nanjing University
- Occupations: Chairman, Amer International Group

Wang Wenyin (Chinese: 王文银; born 2 March 1968) is a Chinese billionaire businessman and the founder and chairman of Amer International Group, a privately held industrial conglomerate based in Shenzhen that focuses on non-ferrous metals, copper products, and cables.

== Early life ==
Wang was born in the Chinese province of Anhui in 1968. He graduated from Nanjing University in 1993, then worked in a warehouse as a manager before starting his own powercord business which eventually grew into Amer International Group. Under his leadership the company has grown from a small power-cord factory into one of China's largest private enterprises by revenue and a Fortune Global 500 company ranked in the mid-hundreds, with reported annual sales of around US$90–100 billion in the early 2020s.

== Career ==
He has multiplied Amer International Group’s mines and factories and has influenced his company in the Communist Party in attempt to challenge the dominance of China’s state-owned giant corporations. It was reported in March 2014 that Wang Wenyin planned to set up a company in Singapore to expand the trading of metals and to purchase global mining assets. As of 25 June 2015, Wang Wenyin was ranked number 125 on Forbes’ list of global billionaires with a net worth of $15 billion, and the 8th richest man in China.

== Personal life ==
As of 2015, Wang resides in Shenzhen, China.
