= China Minsheng Bank =

Chinese banking institution

China Minsheng Banking Corporation Limited 中国民生银行股份有限公司

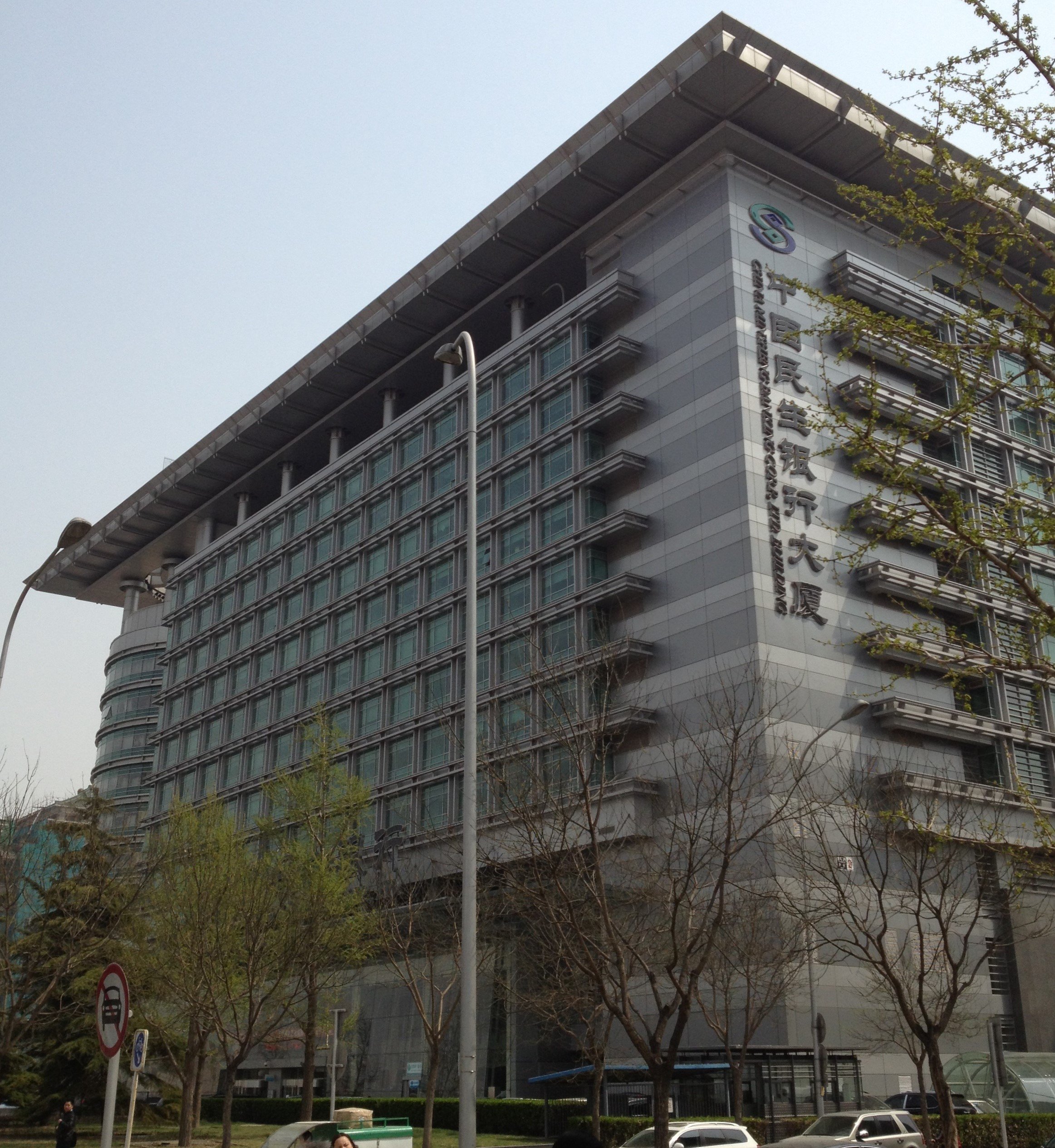
- Head office of China Minsheng Bank on Fuxingmen Inner Street in Beijing
- Type: Publicly traded company
- Traded as: SSE: 600016; SEHK: 1988; SSE 50 Component
- Industry: Bank
- Founded: 12 January 1996; 30 years ago
- Headquarters: No. 2 Fuxingmennei Avenue, Xicheng District, Beijing,
- Area served: Mainland China; Hong Kong
- Operating income: CNY¥137.4 billion (US$21.3 billion) (2023)
- Total assets: CNY¥7.64 trillion (US$1.18 trillion) (2023)
- Owner: Mainly private sector corporations in China
- Divisions: Minsheng Private Banking Service
- Website: www.cmbc.com.cn

China Minsheng Bank (simplified Chinese: 中国民生银行; traditional Chinese: 中國民生銀行; pinyin: Zhōngguó Mínshēng Yínháng) is a significant Chinese bank, founded in 1996 by lawyer and businessman Jing Shuping. It was the first bank to be established with an ownership base of private sector shareholders, as part of the economic reforms led by Premier Zhu Rongji.

Minsheng Bank focuses on making loans to small-medium enterprise. It has over two hundred banking outlets throughout China and relationships with more than seven hundred banks overseas. The bank was publicly listed on the Hong Kong Stock Exchange in 2009.

== History ==
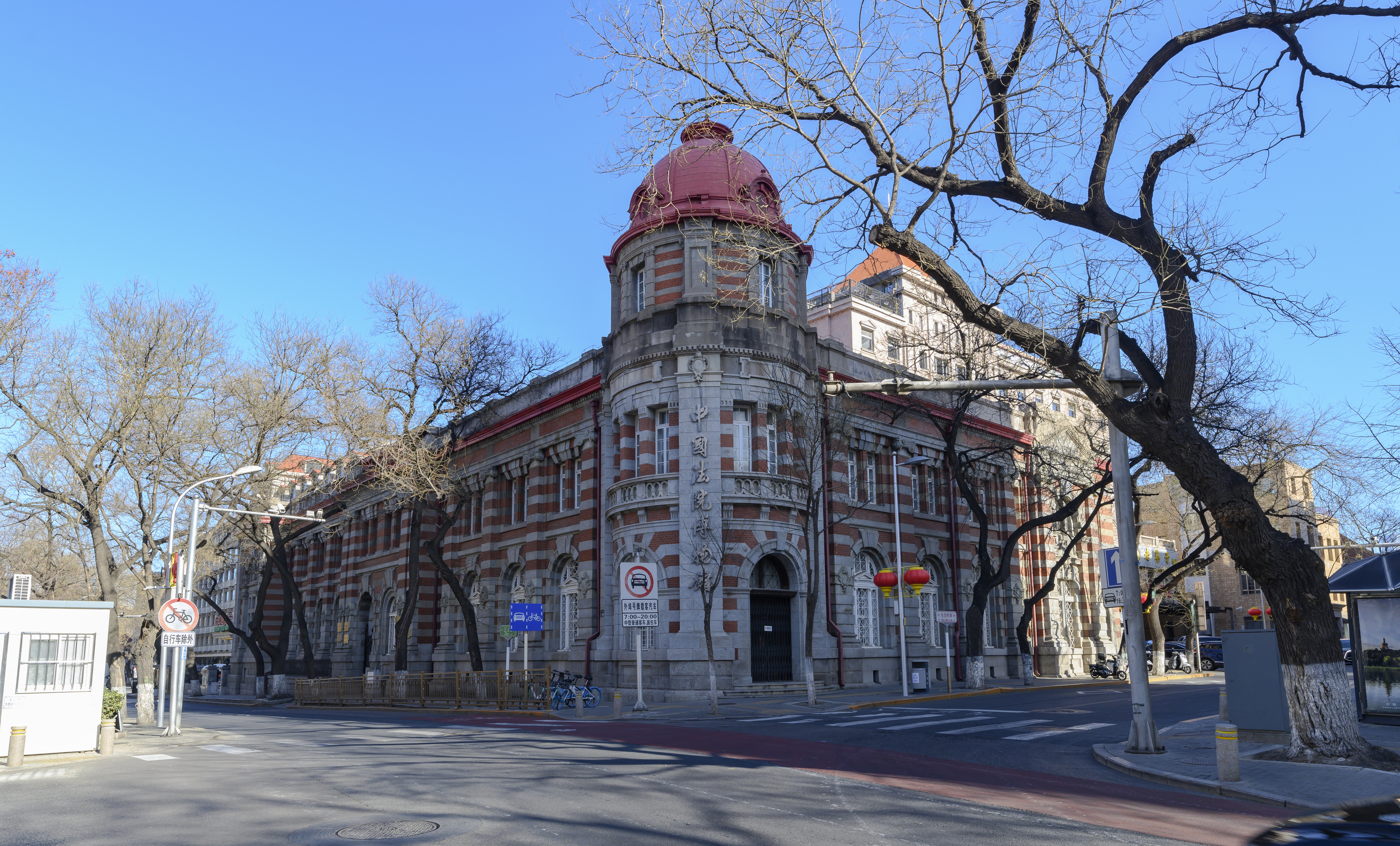
The former building of Yokohama Specie Bank in the Legation Quarter of Beijing was the seat of Minsheng Bank from its founding until the early 21st century.

China Minsheng Bank was officially established on 12 January 1996, aiming to lend primarily to non-state-owned, high-tech, and large enterprises. Nonetheless, the strategy soon ran into difficulty with a 8.72% non-performing loan rate and 40% negative Return On Equity (ROE) in 1999. To overcome this initial turmoil, China Bank replaced its leadership in April 2000, even though Jing Shuping remained its chairman, and undertook additional organisational change in 2007. In 2009, Minsheng Bank confirmed its strategic positioning that fundamentally focuses on private, small and medium corporations and advanced technological businesses, offers moderate risk-taking and heterogeneous financial products and services, and dedicates to expanding path to profitability. In 2011, CMBC innovated its orientation by establishing "a 'customer-focused' scientific and strategic implementation system" for sufficient development and further interests.

In October 2007, Minsheng Bank announced its plans to purchase a 9.9% stake in UCBH Holdings for approximately US$155 million (RMB 1.03 billion), with an opportunity to increase the holding to 20%. However, on November 6, 2009, the US Federal Deposit Insurance Corporation (FDIC) took over UCB, a subsidiary of UCBH Holdings, resulting in a loss for Minsheng Bank. Despite this development, the bank had already made sufficient provisions for the investment and the loss did not have a significant impact on its operations.

Minsheng Bank also revealed that it intended to invest approximately US$343 million (RMB 2.342 billion) to acquire a 26.58% stake (equivalent to 143 million shares) in Shaanxi International Trust, which would have made it the largest shareholder. However, due to major changes in the capital market, Minsheng Bank later decided to cancel this investment.

In April 2008, Minsheng Bank was granted permission to establish Minsheng Financial Leasing Company with a total investment of approximately US$470 million (RMB 3.2 billion). Minsheng Bank and Tianjin Bonded Zone Investment Company jointly invested in the company, with Minsheng Bank holding an 81.25% stake and Tianjin Bonded Zone Investment Company holding an 18.75% stake. By December 2009, the total assets of Minsheng Financial Leasing Company had reached approximately US$3.5 billion (RMB 23.6 billion).

In November 2008, Minsheng Bank, together with the Royal Bank of Canada and the Three Gorges Finance Company, established Minsheng Royal Fund Management Co., Ltd. in Shenzhen, with a registered capital of US$422 million (RMB 300 million), of which the three shareholders hold 63.33%, 30%, and 6.67%, respectively. The company has been making considerable progress in fund issuance, management scale, investment performance, and profitability in line with the management concept of specialization and marketization since its inception. In 2006, Royal Bank of Canada entered into a joint venture agreement with China Minsheng Bank to launch a new Chinese joint venture fund management company. The joint venture company, with headquarters in Shanghai, will create, manage, and sell mutual funds in local currency to retail and institutional investors in China.

On June 22, 2009, Minsheng Bank announced that it had completed the sale of more than 380 million Haitong Securities shares held for debt repayment, with an average selling price of US$2.12 (RMB 14.33) per share and a total disposal amount of US$800 million (RMB 5.458 billion).

In November 2009, Minsheng Bank launched an initial public offering in Hong Kong, with a maximum fundraising of US$4 billion (HKD 31.56 billion). The bank's IPO was oversubscribed 157 times, freezing up to US$32 billion (HKD 249.3 billion) in funds. The bank eventually priced its IPO at HKD 9.08 per share and officially listed on November 26, 2009.

In September 2024, Reuters reported China Minsheng Bank cut the salary of its staff by 50% and stopped paying for some work-related expenses in its Beijing branch, in line of the common prosperity agenda promoted by Chinese leader Xi Jinping.

== See also ==
- Minsheng Bank Building
- Liu Yonghao
