= Jin Baofang =

Chinese businessman

- Born: 1952 (age 73–74)

Jin Baofang (born 1952) is a Chinese billionaire and businessman, the chairman and CEO of JA Solar Holdings, one of the world's largest manufacturers of integrated solar panels.

Jin Baofang founded JA Technology in 2005. Before that, he worked as an electricity bureau official in Ningjin. Later, he also became the Vice President of the China Photovoltaic Industry Association and the director of PV Products Association Branch of the China Chamber of Commerce for Import and Export of Machinery and Electronic Products. On November 8, the company announced that the Pingdu Supervisory Committee had investigated him in accordance with the "China Supervision Law". The same month, businessman was detained by Chinese authorities, but in April 2021 he was released and returned to work.

Jin Baofang made the 2022 Forbes Billionaires List with an estimated wealth of $11.3 billion and occupied the 163rd position.
