= Liu Yongxing =

Chinese businessman (born 1948)

- Born: 1948 (age 77–78); Sichuan, China
- Education: Xihua University
- Occupations: Chairman and CEO, East Hope Group
- Children: Liu Shawn
- Relatives: Liu Yonghao (brother); Liu Yongyan (brother); Chen Yuxin (brother); Liu Yonghong(sister)

Liu Yongxing (Chinese: 刘永行, born June 1948) is a Chinese businessman. He is the founder, chairman and CEO of East Hope Group, a Chinese company active in the agribusiness as well as chemical and non-ferrous metal industries. He is the honorary president of the Shanghai Chamber of Commerce in Sichuan, a part-time professor at China Agricultural University, MBA lecturer, and a member of the Standing Committee of the CPPCC.

== Personal life ==
Liu Yongxing was born in Sichuan, China, and has three brothers, Liu Yongyan (刘永言), Chen Yuxin (陈育新) and Liu Yonghao (刘永好), as well as one sister, Liu Yonghong (刘永红). They started out as farm workers in low social standing due to their family background as wealthy landlords before the Cultural Revolution.

He graduated from Xihua University in 1968.

Liu's wife is a psychologist by training, with whom he has one child. He resides in Shanghai.

== Career ==
In the late 1970s, Liu Yongxing and his brothers founded an electronics company that had to close soon after, as such business ventures were regarded as “too capitalistic” at the time.

In 1982, Liu YongXing and his three brothers, accumulated 1,000 RMB and started a company called the “Hope Group.” The business consisted of raising quail and hatching chickens in the Sichuan Province. They also established the Hope Research Center for animal feeds in 1986.

In 1995, Hope Group was split up into four separate companies among the siblings: West Hope Group (Chen Yuxin), New Hope Group (Liu Yonghai) and Continental Hope Group (Liu Yongyan). Liu Yongxing retained parts of the agricultural business and got involved in the heavy chemical and aluminium industry, which ultimately led to the founding of today’s East Hope Group in 1995, one of the largest aluminium producers worldwide.

In 1999, Liu Yongxing relocated his East Hope HQ to Shanghai, China.

In 2002, Liu Yongxing started his business in the Aluminum industry.

In August 2016, Chinese news site Sohu published a profile covering Liu Yongxing and his approach to conducting business. Concerning criticism about environmental pollution caused by East Hope factories, the article quotes Liu as saying that “in the heavy chemical industry, environmental issues are a common risk, so I do everything in accordance with the most stringent standards.” Nevertheless, East Hope Group has been penalized multiple times for violating environmental regulations that included fines, forced production cuts and technical upgrades. For example, punishments were handed out in 2014, 2015 and 2016 for exceeding SO2, NOx and dust emission caps of the Group’s plants in Shandong, Xinjiang, Henan and Inner Mongolia.

In 2015, East Hope's Baotou plant received 4.2 billion yuan in funds to incentivize upgrading its environmental protection facilities, while at the same time, a new kiln for solid waste disposal at one of the company's cement factories was regarded as innovative by Chinese authorities, according to East Hope sources.

On 15 December 2016, two people were killed when a red mud reservoir at East Hope’s Sanmenxia plant failed. Four months prior to the accident, amid another red mud spill incident in the province, the local government conducted safety inspections at East Hope facilities and approved their full compliance with the standards. Thus far, there are no reports that the company has faced repercussions for the accident.

== Awards and honors ==
In 2002, Liu Yongxing was rewarded with the “2001 CCTV Top 10 China’s Economic Leaders” award, as well as with the “Sohu 2001 Top 10 Financial Leaders” award.

== Wealth ==
Liu Yongxing is regarded among the richest people in China. In 2017 he was ranked #18 on Forbes’ China Rich List with a net worth of $6.6 billion, which also makes him the richest Shanghai resident. Also in 2017 Bloomberg’s Billionaires Index ranked him at #93 globally with $12.3 billion. His brothers are also billionaires and owners of their own companies.
