= Henan Agricultural University =

Agricultural school in Zhengzhou, China

- 河南农业大学
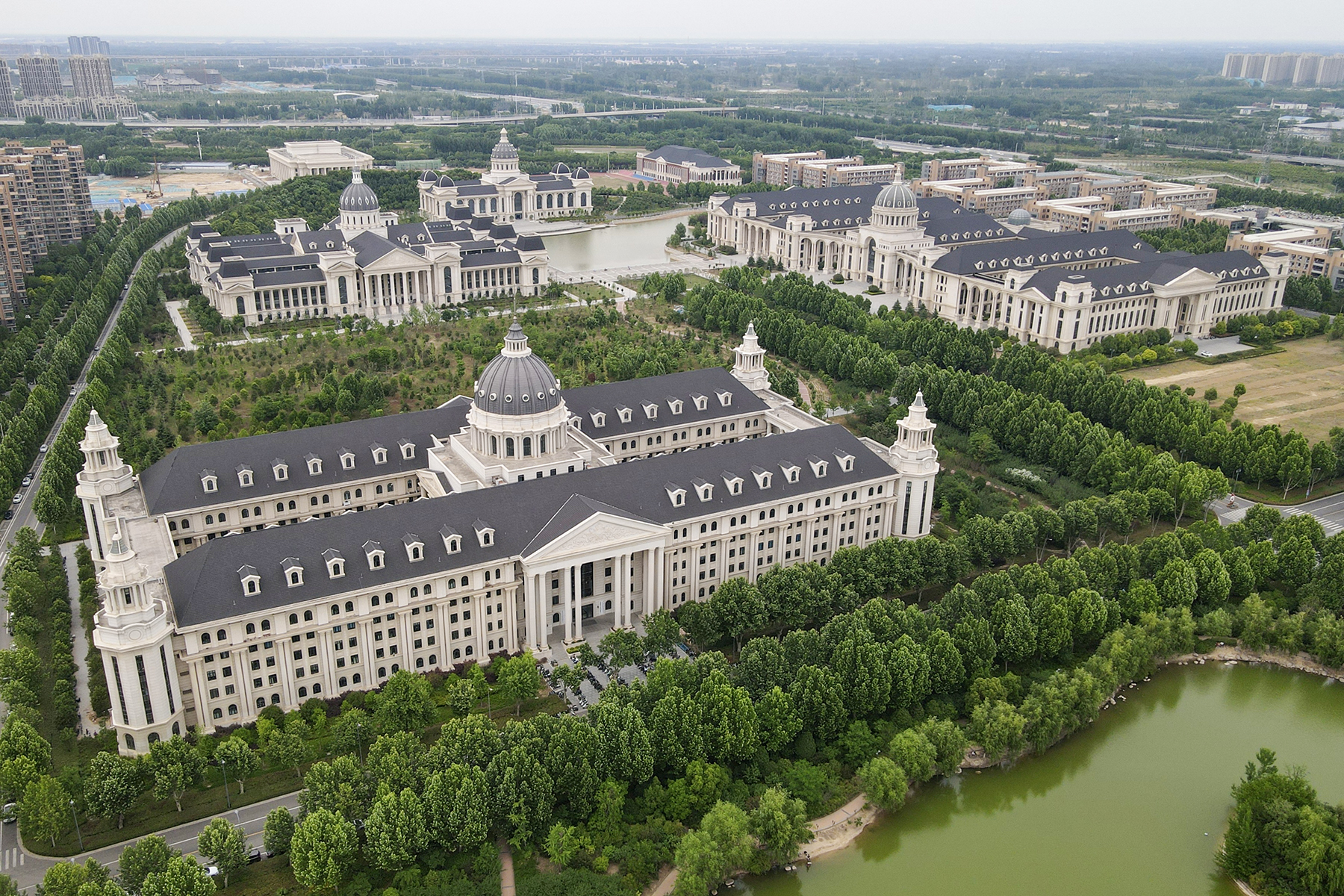
- Longzihu campus
- Type: National
- Established: 1912
- Location: Zhengzhou, China
- Website: www.henau.edu.cn

Henan Agricultural University (Chinese: 河南农业大学; pinyin: Hénán Nóngyè Dàxué) is a public university in Zhengzhou, China. It was established in 1912 as Henan Public Agricultural Major School. The school area occupies approximately 144,000 square meters.

The university established intercollegiate ties with universities in the United Kingdom, United States, Canada, Australia, New Zealand, Japan, Thailand, the Netherlands and other countries.

== Academics ==
The university offers 10 departments: Agricultural, Engineering, Management, Economics, Laws, Science, Arts, Education, Medical Science, Musical Art. It is equipped with 20 colleges.

The university has 1st and 2nd levels and national key disciplines, 34 provincial key disciplines, six postdoctoral research bachelors, five 1st level Ph.D. degree authorization subjects, 28 Ph.D. points, 18 1st level master's degree authorization subjects, 73 master's degree programs, and 54 degree courses.

== Research ==
A national wheat engineering technology research center, national corn improvement (Zhengzhou) branch, the national tobacco cultivation physiological and biochemical research base support 24 national and provincial research centers and key laboratories. More than 1700 teaching staff are on site, including 11 double-hired academicians, more than 400 professors and associate professors, and three 1st and 2nd level experts of national "key talent project". The experts earned a "Chinese agriculture talent award", four national outstanding contribution young and middle-age experts, 34 researchers have special allowance from the state council of China, two are national key teachers, 11 are provincial class doctors, 34 are province administrating experts, seven are provincial innovative talents, 29 are provincial academic technology leaders, and 68 are provincial key teachers.

== International Maize and Wheat Improvement Center ==
In January 2017, Henan Agricultural University and the International Maize and Wheat Improvement Center (CIMMYT, Texcoco, Mexico) signed a long-term collaborative agreement to expand on the knowledge and capacities of each institution by setting up shared research programs. Scientists from CIMMYT and the university agreed to collaborate and publish in a new state-of-the-art research center, benefiting the world of agricultural research as well as the smallholder farmer in wheat and maize growing regions around the world.

Henan Province produces over 6 million hectares of wheat and over 3 million hectares of maize, equating to more than 25% of China's wheat production and 10% of its maize. The CIMMYT collaboration will focus on scientist training and research as well as technological innovation in the plant sciences.

== Campus, art and culture ==
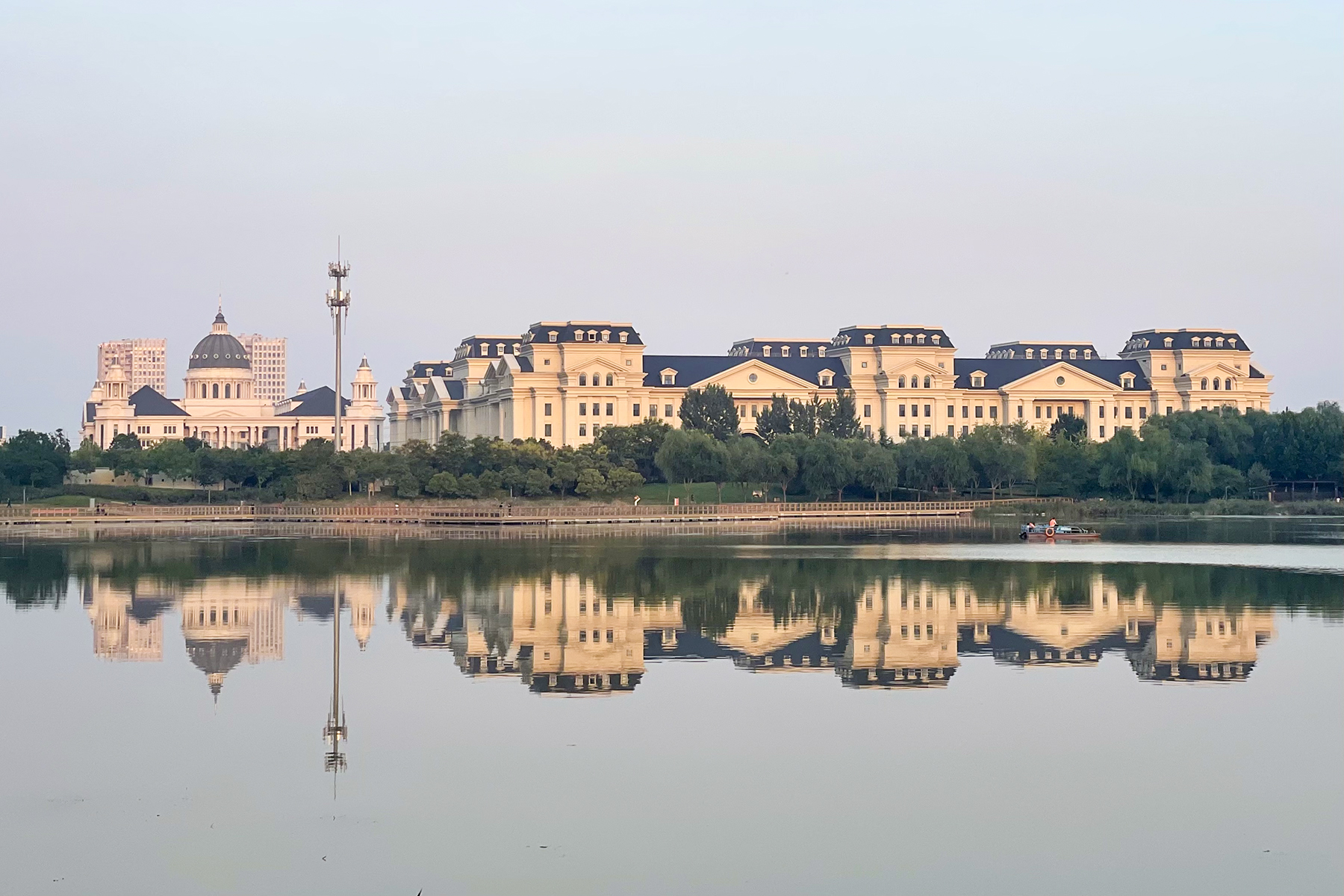
Longzihu Campus

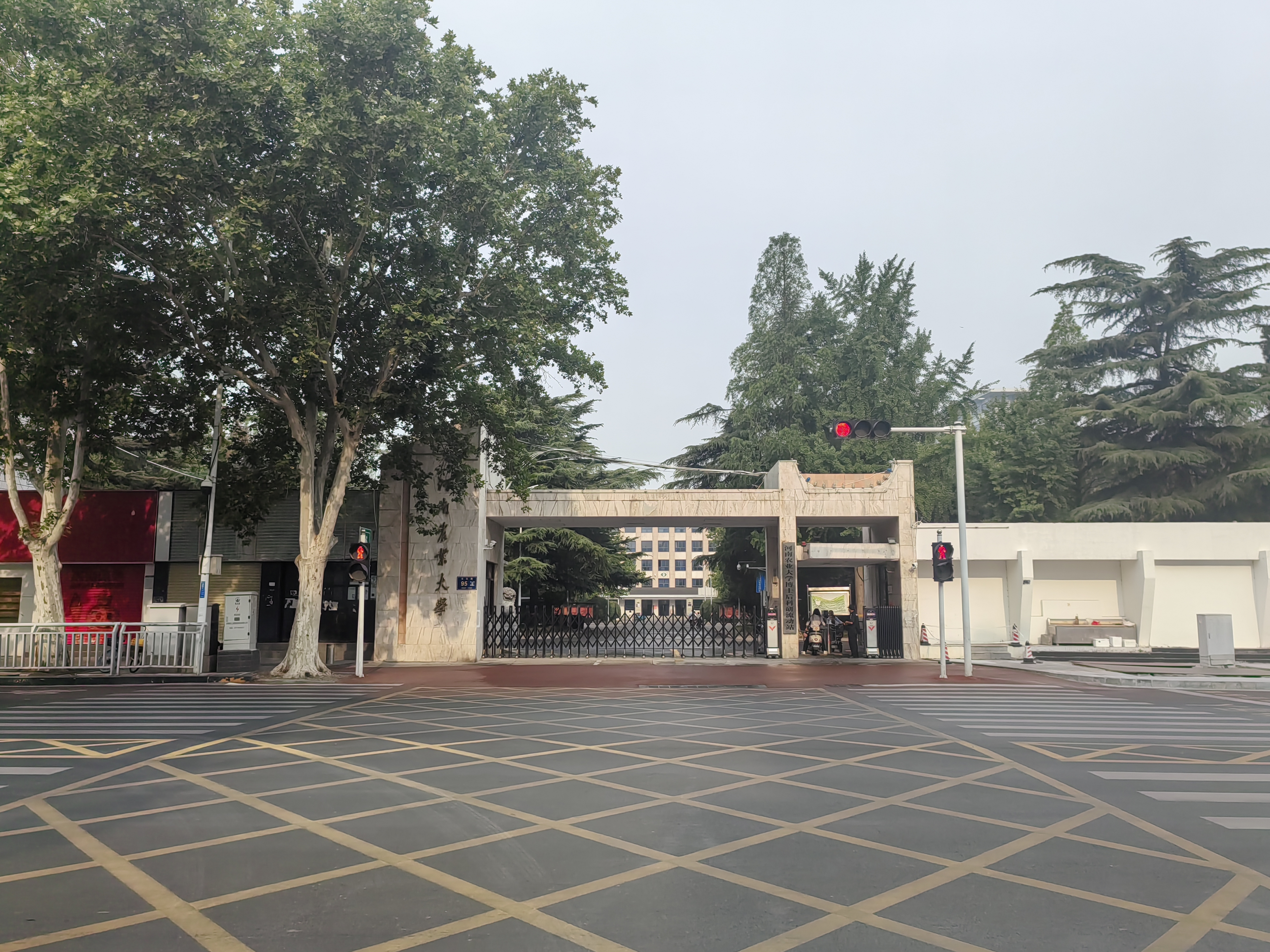
Wenhua Road Campus

The campus is at the center of Zhengzhou, covering approximately 144000 m^{2}. The design is made of themed parks on each side of campus. The design makes use of the drainage system and the natural environment.

== International students ==
The school started to enroll foreign students in 1987. To enable the foreign students to better adapt to university life, they can start special courses before the fall. International Education College of Henan Agricultural University established a Chinese training program in 2004.
