= Shijia Township, Shizhu County =

Shijia Township, Shizhu County 石家乡
- Township
- Location inChongqing
- Coordinates: 30°17′10″N 108°19′33″E
- Country: People's Republic of China
- Municipality: Chongqing
- Autonomous county: Shizhu Tujia Autonomous County

Area
  - Total: 62.48 km^{2} (24.12 sq mi)

Population (2017)
  - Total: 6,619
  - Density: 105.9/km^{2} (274.4/sq mi)
- Time zone: UTC+08:00 (China Standard)
- Postal code: 409124
- Area code: 023

Shijia Township (simplified Chinese: 石家乡; traditional Chinese: 石家鄉; pinyin: Shíjiā Xiāng) is a township in Shizhu Tujia Autonomous County, Chongqing, China. As of the 2017 census it had a population of 6,619 and an area of 62.48 square kilometres (24.12 sq mi).

== Administrative division ==
As of 2016, the township is divided into five villages:

- Shilong (石龙村)
- Huanglong (黄龙村)
- Fenghuang (凤凰村)
- Jiulong (九龙村)
- Anqiao (安桥村)

== History ==
In 1932, it was known as "Shijia" (石家镇). In 1940 it was renamed "Shijia Township".

== Economy ==
The economy of the township is mainly based on agriculture.

== Transportation ==
The China National Highway G350 passes through the township west to east.

== See also ==
- List of township-level divisions of Chongqing
