= Ding Shijia =

- Born: Hong Kong
- Citizenship: China
- Education: Fujian Institute of Economics and Management.
- Employer: Anta Sports

Ding Shijia is the Deputy Chairman of Anta Sports Products Ltd and also a Vice President. He primarily responsible for the management of Anta Group’s footwear operations. As of per Forbes list 2011, he is the 1,140th richest person in the world and 103rd richest person in China. Shijia has net worth of $7.0 billion.

== History ==
Ding worked as Deputy Factory Manager of Jinjiang Shifa from 1992 to 1993 and joined Anta Group on 30 July 1994.

- 1992 : Joined Jinjiang Shifa as Deputy Factory Manager.
- 1994 : Joined Anta Group on 30 July 1994.
- 2000 : Designated as General Manager of Anta Fujian.
- 2000 : Became Chairman of the Board of Directors of Anta China.
- 2010 : Took charge as Deputy Chairman of Anta Sports Products Ltd.
- 2007 : Became Executive Director of Anta Sports Products Ltd.

== Awards ==
In 2002 and 2004, Shijia was awarded the title of Eminent Young Entrepreneur of Quanzhou.

== See also ==
- Forbes list of billionaires (2011)
- Business magnate
- Entrepreneur
- Billionaire
- List of Chinese by net worth
- List of countries by the number of billionaires
