= Nongfu Spring =

Chinese beverage company

Nongfu Spring Co., Ltd.
- Native name: 农夫山泉股份有限公司
- Type: Public
- Traded as: SEHK: 9633; Hang Seng Index component
- Industry: Beverages
- Founded: September 26, 1996; 29 years ago
- Founder: Zhong Shanshan
- Headquarters: Hangzhou, China
- Key people: Zhong Shanshan (Chairman & founder)
- Products: Bottled water, Beverages
- Revenue: $3.4 billion (2019)
- Owner: Zhong Shanshan
- Website: nongfuspring.com

Nongfu Spring Co., Ltd.
- Simplified Chinese: 农夫山泉股份有限公司
- Traditional Chinese: 農夫山泉股份有限公司
Transcriptions
Standard Mandarin
- Hanyu Pinyin: nóng-fū shān-quán gǔ-fèn yǒu-xiàn gōng-sī

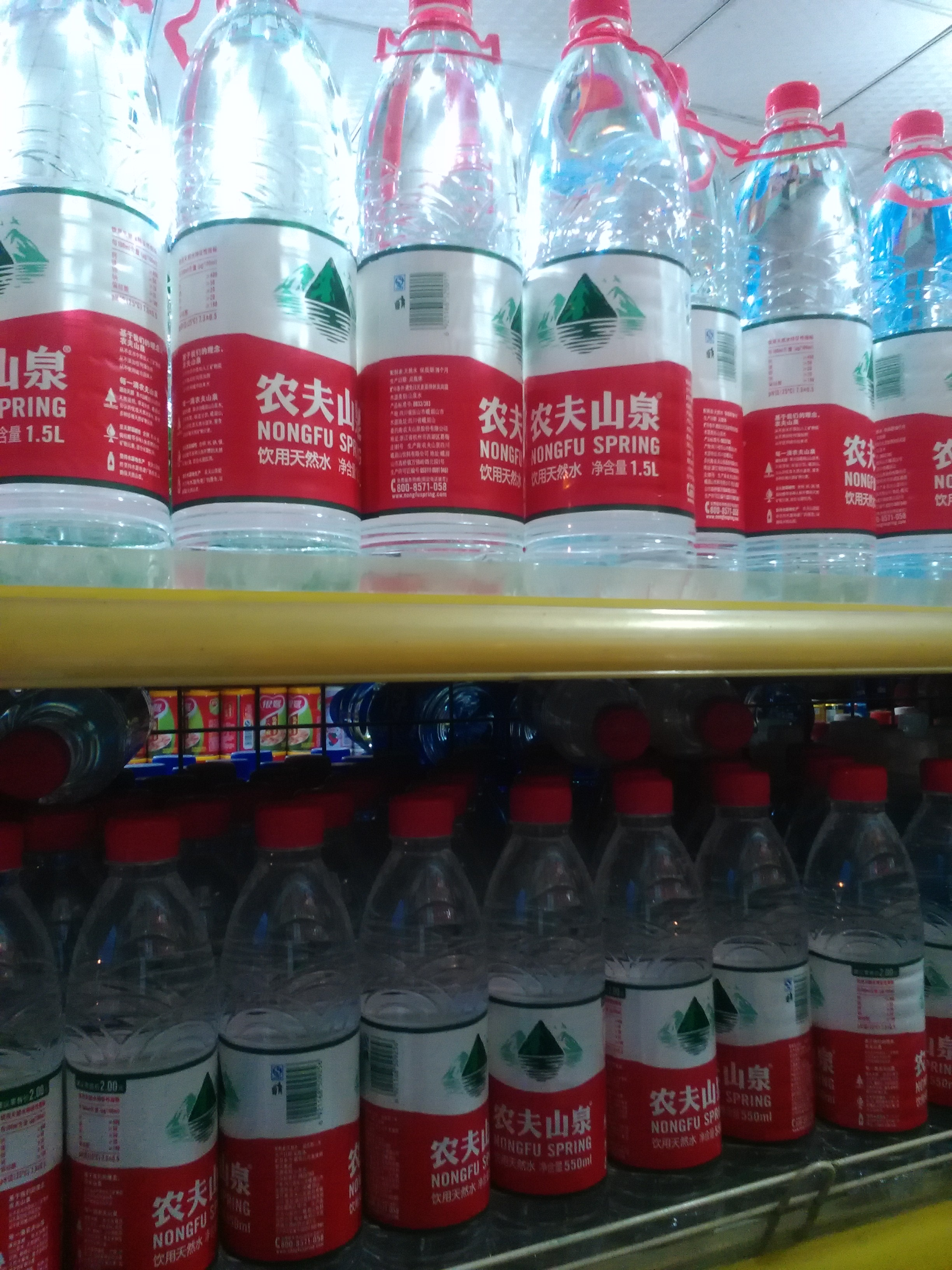
Nongfu Spring water bottles

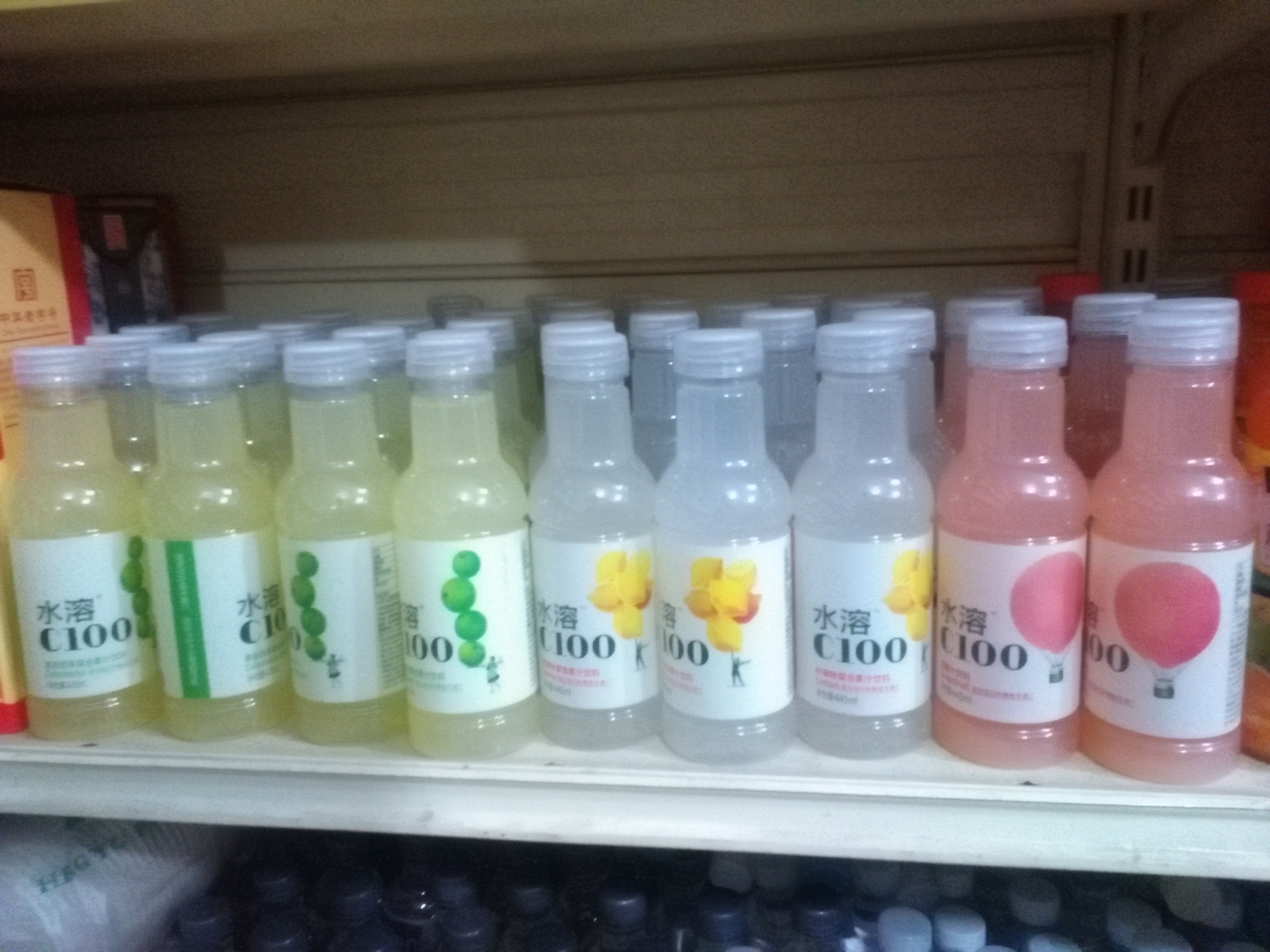
Shuirong C100

Nongfu Spring (simplified Chinese: 农夫山泉; traditional Chinese: 農夫山泉; pinyin: Nóngfū Shānquán; lit. "farmer's mountain spring") Is a Chinese bottled water and soft beverage company headquartered in Xihu District, Hangzhou, Zhejiang province. It is owned and chaired by founder Zhong Shanshan.

== History ==
The company was established on September 26, 1996. It launched its first packaged drinking water product in 1997 with water sourced from Zhejiang Thousand-Island Lake and became the joint stock company Nongfu Spring Co., Ltd in 2001.

As reported by Reuters, Nongfu Spring filed an initial public offering with the Hong Kong Stock Exchange. The company raised approximately US$1 billion by pricing its IPO at the HKD 21.50 per share, at the top end of its IPO range.

It developed and launched a range of beverages, including Farmer's Orchard, Scream and Oriental Leaf and used marketing slogans, most notably 'a little bit sweet' to popular effect.

Through growth and acquisition, Nongfu Spring has become China's largest bottled water producer and a top three producer in the bottled tea and juice market.

According to Nielsen research data, Nongfu Springs natural water became in 2012 the most popular bottled water in China.

On April 10, 2013, the Beijing Times accused the company of intentionally not adopting Chinese national water standards and instead adopting the lower standards of Zhejiang province. This started a dispute between the company and the newspaper. In November 2013, the company accused the Beijing Times of defamation and filed a lawsuit in the Beijing Second Intermediate People's Court against the newspaper, demanding 60 million yuan (US$9.85 million) in damages.

In 2016, chairman of the company, Zhong Shanshan, announced a new strategy to diversify the company and to globalize operations Nongfu Spring is part of the Yangshengtang group of companies, which also includes pharmaceutical companies Beijing Wantai and Hainan Yangshengtang Pharmaceuticals.

In 2018, the brand's bottles was used in an exhibition called 'Nongfu Spring Market' by activist and performance artist Nut Brother which highlighted the pollution occurring in rural villages.

As set out in its prospectus, the company recorded revenue of 24 billion yuan (US$3.4 billion) in 2019, up from 20.47 billion yuan a year earlier. The prospectus also shows profit of 4.95 billion yuan in 2019, a 20.6% increase on its 3.61 billion yuan profit the year prior.

Sponsorship of major sports has become a feature of Nongfu Spring's marketing, and in 2019 Nongfu Spring signed a two-year deal with the International Swimming Federation (FINA) as partner for FINA major events in 2020 and 2021.

Nongfu Spring has diversified its product base to include coffee and tea beverages, fruit products, yogurt and rice. The company announced its revenue and net profit decreased in the three months ending March 31, 2020, compared to the same three-month period in 2019 due to the COVID-19 pandemic. Mainland production plants, closed during the Chinese New Year holiday, were returned to normal operation.

In September 2020, Nongfu Spring raised approximately US$1bn by pricing its IPO at the HKD21.50/share, at the top-end of its IPO range.

=== Nashua property purchase ===
National security concerns have been raised about Nongfu Spring's purchase of property in Nashua, New Hampshire given the property's proximity to military bases and critical infrastructure.

Public record unveiled in 2025 showed Nongfu bought a commercial property in Nashua, New Hampshire with an assessed value at US$15 million for US$67 million. A NewsNation report said the property is located next to infrastructure belonging to a water utility company in the state and is close to the city's airport, several defense centers and a Federal Aviation Administration control center. The purchase has drawn opposition from Republican State Senator Kevin Avard (whose district includes part of Nashua) and Republican activist Lily Tang Williams, and prompted Republican State Senator Regina Birdsell to introduce legislation that would ban buyers from China from purchasing property in the state.

== Products ==
Nongfu Spring's first packaged drinking water product was launched in 1997. The company ceased to remove natural minerals from its bottled water in 1999 and marketed its water products as natural water. Nongfu Spring now offers a full range of water products from its 10 natural water sources across China. It is currently finalizing purchase of its first overseas water source and production facility, Otakiri Springs, in New Zealand.

- In 2003, it launched its Nongfu Orchard range of fruit drinks with fruit grains. The following year it targeted the teenage market with its range of 'Scream' drinks as it sought to expand its consumer base.
- In 2008, it launched water-soluble vitamin C drinks, Shuirong C100.
- In 2010, it launched "Victory Vitamin Water" beverage.
- In 2011, "Oriental Leaf", a sugar-free tea beverage.
- In 2012, "Whisked Milk Tea" series of milk tea beverages.
- In 2014, the company launched its 17.5°oranges, its first entry into the fruit market and an expansion of its product offering.
- In 2015, "Nongfu Spring" Natural Mineral Water (in glass bottles), "Nongfu Spring" natural drinking water (suitable for infants and young children), and "Nongfu Spring" natural mineral water with the sports cap.
- In 2016, "Nongfu Spring" Natural Mineral Water (Limited edition in Monkey Year), 17.5°NFC (Not From Concentrate) 100% Orange Juice & Apple Juice, Tea π(fruit flavored tea), Fruit flavored soft drink. Nongfu Spring 100% NFC Orange Juice, Apple Banana Juice & Mango Blended Juice.
- In 2018, in response to consumer demand, the company expanded its range of natural water products to include a 12L disposable barrel.
- In 2019, Nongfu Spring it entered the coffee market for the first time with its TanBing range of coffee products.
