= Luo Liguo =

Chinese billionaire businessman

- 罗立国
- Born: March 1956 (age 69–70); Cixi, Zhejiang, China
- Occupation: Businessman
- Known for: Becoming a Chinese billionaire
- Spouse: Wang Baodi
- Children: 2 (Luo Yi, Luo Yedong)

Luo Liguo (罗立国, born March 1956) is a Chinese billionaire and businessman, a chair of the Hoshine Silicon Industry specializing in electronics, photovoltaic, and chemical products.

When he was a child, Liguo learned how to make straw hats. After graduating from the university, he borrowed 20,000 yuan and founded the Cixi Shenyi Handicraft Factory specializing in the straw hat business. In the 1990s, he established Cixi Tianyi Investment, Hangzhou Jimei Real Estate, Xinxin Real Estate and other companies. In the late 1990s, he started investing in the production of silicon materials in Xinjiang, Shihezi, Heihe and other places.

Luo Liguo made the 2022 Forbes Billionaires List with an estimated wealth of $17 billion and occupied the 100th position.
