= Hoshine Silicon Industry =

Chinese Silicon Company

Hoshine Silicon Industry Co., Ltd.
- Native name: 合盛硅业股份有限公司
- Company type: Public
- Traded as: SSE: 603260
- Industry: Chemicals
- Founded: 23 August 2005; 20 years ago
- Founder: Luo Liguo
- Headquarters: Ningbo, Zhejiang, China
- Key people: Luo Liguo (Chairman); Luo Yedong (CEO)
- Revenue: ▲CN¥26.58 billion (2023)
- Net income: ▼CN¥2.58 billion (2023)
- Total assets: ▲CN¥83.34 billion (2023)
- Total equity: ▲CN¥32.42 billion (2023)
- Number of employees: 25,309 (2023)
- Website: www.hoshinesilicon.com

Hoshine Silicon Industry (Hoshine; Chinese: 合盛硅业; pinyin: Héshèng Guīyè) is a publicly listed Chinese company that engages in the development and sale of silicon-based material products.

It is one of the world's largest producers of silicon metal.

== Background ==
In 2005, Hoshine was founded by Luo Liguo.

On 30 October 2017, Hoshine held its initial public offering becoming a listed company on the Shanghai Stock Exchange.

In June 2021, the Biden administration ordered a ban on U.S. imports of a key solar panel material from Hoshine. The U.S. Customs and Border Protection (CBP) separately banned imports of silicon-based products made by Hoshine as well as goods made using those products. Alejandro Mayorkas stated the agency had information reasonably indicating that Hoshine used Uyghur forced labor in Xinjiang to produce its silicon-based products. The United States Department of Commerce also added Hoshine to the Entity List.

In August 2022, Bloomberg News reported that despite U.S. restrictions, Hoshine continued to expand its business with its share price up 111% since the restrictions were announced.

On 20 February 2024, Hoshine filed a complaint at the United States Court of International Trade challenging the CBP's decision in June 2021.
