= Amer International Group =

Chinese industrial conglomerate

Amer International Group 正威集团
- Type: Private
- Industry: Conglomerate
- Founded: June 1995; 31 years ago in Shenzhen, China
- Founder: Wang Wenyin
- Headquarters: Shenzhen, China
- Area served: Worldwide
- Revenue: 505,118,260,000 renminbi (2018)
- Owner: Wang Wenyin
- Number of employees: 17,886
- Website: www.amer.com.cn

Amer International Group Ltd (Chinese: 深圳正威 (集团) 有限公司; pinyin: Shēnzhèn zhèngwēi (jítuán) yǒuxiàn gōngsī) is a high-tech industrial enterprise, mainly dealing in non-ferrous metals and non-metallic materials. The company was founded by Chinese business magnate Wang Wenyin. Currently the company has four domestic headquarters located in Shenzhen (head office), Shanghai, Tianjin, and Chongqing, and three international headquarters in Singapore, Geneva and Los Angeles. Amer International Group has six major business sectors and investment fields: health care, energy, finance, manufacturing, resources and culture.

Amer International Group has 18 industrial parks, 3 commodity exchange centers and one "technology and innovation center" located across 13 different provinces.

The company was founded in 1995 in Shenzhen. From 2013 to 2018 Amer rose from 397th (2013) to 111th (2018) place at the Fortune Global 500 list with a turnover of $72.766 billion and net profit of $1.545 billion (2018). In 2018 Amer was ranked as 2nd largest private manufacturing enterprise and 3rd private enterprise within China.

Global Ranking
Ranking list	Year												
Ranking list	2009	2010	2011	2012	2013	2014	2015	2016	2017	2018	2019	2020	2021
Fortune Global 500 list					397th	295th	247th	190th	183rd	111th	119th	91st	68th
Top 500 Enterprises of China	461st	196th	118th	81st	59th	50th	45th	40th	41st	27th			
Top 500 Enterprises of China's Manufacturing Industry	264th	94th	49th	30th	20th	18th	15th	12th	12th	6th			
China Top 500 Private Enterprises							5th	5th	5th	3rd			
China Top 500 Private Manufacturing Enterprises								4th	3rd	2nd			

In 2015, American molybdenum mineral development, exploration, and mining company General Moly announced a strategic partnership with Amer International Group. According to the terms of the partnership, Amer acquired 40 million of Moly's shares and procured a $700 million loan for the development of the Mt. Hope Project.

The company was also in talks to buy English football club Southampton for £246 million in March 2017.
