= Cuiping Subdistrict, Dazhou =

Cuiping Subdistrict 翠屏街道
- Subdistrict
- Location in Sichuan
- Coordinates: 31°12′7″N 107°30′13″E
- Country: People's Republic of China
- Province: Sichuan
- Prefecture-level city: Dazhou
- District: Dachuan District
- Time zone: UTC+8 (China Standard)

Cuiping Subdistrict (Chinese: 翠屏街道; pinyin: Cuìpíng Jiēdào) is a subdistrict in Dachuan District, Dazhou, Sichuan, China. As of 2020, it administers the following seven residential communities:

- Caojiezi Community (草街子社区)
- Jinhua Community (金华社区)
- Nanba Community (南坝社区)
- Xinnan Community (新南社区)
- Xinqiao Community (新桥社区)
- Shijiawan Community (石家湾社区)
- Gayun Community (嘎云社区)

== See also ==
- List of township-level divisions of Sichuan
