= Neixiang County =

Neixiang County 内乡县 Neisiang, Nei-hsiang
- County
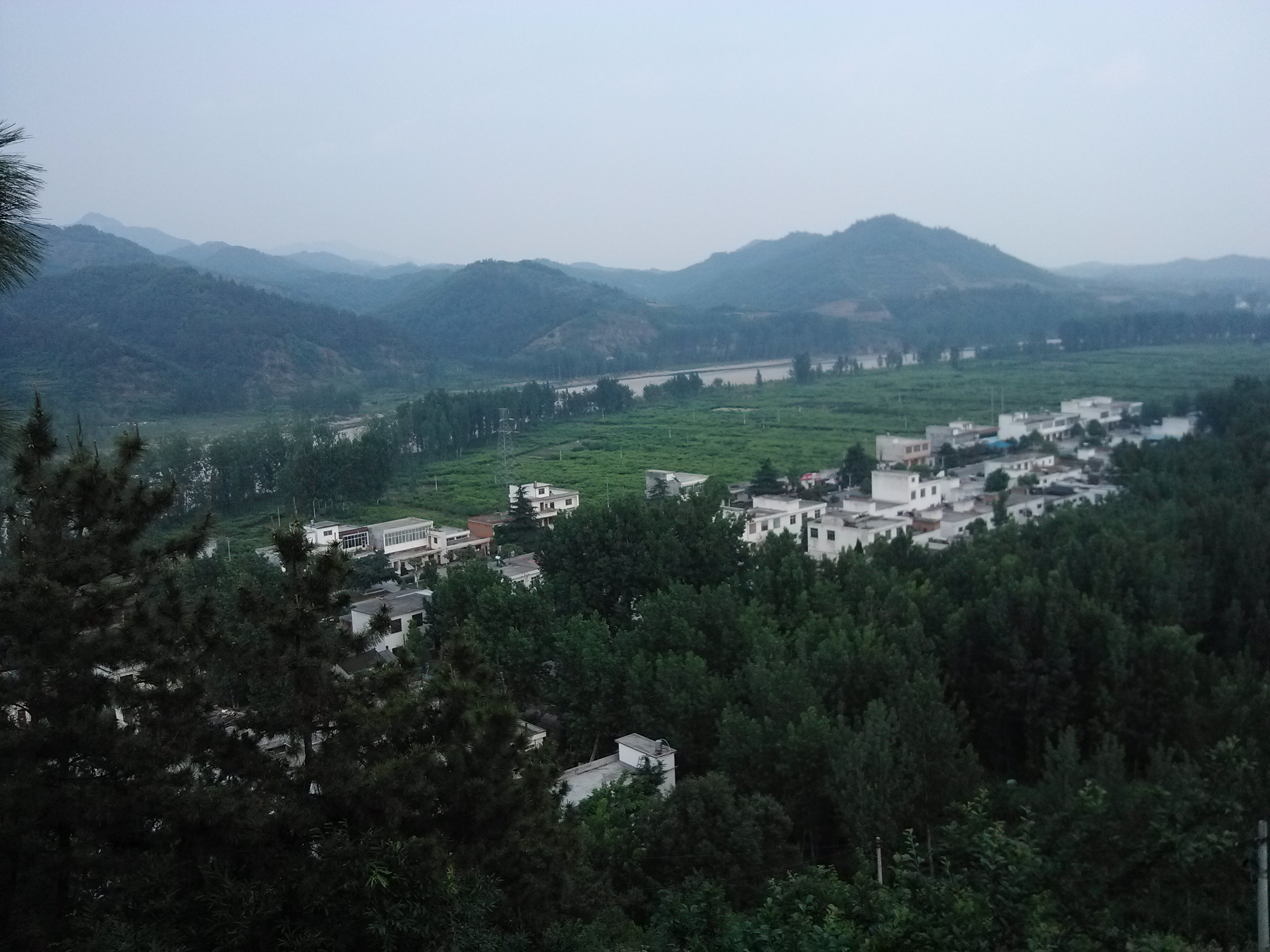

- Location of the seat in Henan
- Coordinates: 33°3′0″N 111°49′48″E
- Country: People's Republic of China
- Province: Henan
- Prefecture-level city: Nanyang

Area
  - Total: 2,465 km^{2} (952 sq mi)

Population (2019)
  - Total: 567,100
  - Density: 230.1/km^{2} (595.9/sq mi)
- Time zone: UTC+8 (China Standard)
- Postal code: 474350
- Area code: 0377
- Website: www.neixiang.gov.cn

Neixiang County (simplified Chinese: 内乡县; traditional Chinese: 內鄉縣; pinyin: Nèixiāng Xiàn) is a county under the jurisdiction of Nanyang City, in the southwest of Henan province, China. It has an area of 2,465 km^{2} (952 sq mi) and a population of 610,000 as of 2002.

Neixiang is best known because it has China's best preserved Yamen, or county government office. The Yamen in Neixiang was originally built in the Yuan Dynasty and has a history of more than 700 years. It was destroyed and rebuilt several times, and the existing architecture mostly dates to the Qing Dynasty when it was built by Zhang Bingtao in 1882; it took three years to build. It has an area of 20,000 m^{2} (220,000 sq ft), and there are more than 260 existing rooms. It is currently China's best-preserved feudal county government office.

It is home to Neixiang Air Base.

== Administrative divisions ==
As of 2012, this county is divided to 10 towns and 6 townships.

Towns

- Chengguan (城关镇)
- Xiaguan (夏馆镇)
- Shigang (师岗镇)
- Mashankou (马山口镇)
- Tuandong (湍东镇)
- Chimei (赤眉镇)
- Wating (瓦亭镇)
- Wangdian (王店镇)
- Guanzhang (灌涨镇)
- Taoxi (桃溪镇)

Townships

- Banchang Township (板场乡)
- Daqiao Township (大桥乡)
- Zhaodian Township (赵店乡)
- Qiliping Township (七里坪乡)
- Yuguan Township (余关乡)
- Zuopi Township (乍岖乡)

== Climate ==
Climate data for Neixiang, elevation 221 m (725 ft), (1991–2020 normals, extremes 1981–2010)
Month	Jan	Feb	Mar	Apr	May	Jun	Jul	Aug	Sep	Oct	Nov	Dec	Year
Record high °C (°F)	21.5 (70.7)	25.3 (77.5)	29.4 (84.9)	35.0 (95.0)	39.0 (102.2)	41.1 (106.0)	40.3 (104.5)	38.1 (100.6)	40.0 (104.0)	34.1 (93.4)	30.5 (86.9)	22.4 (72.3)	41.1 (106.0)
Mean daily maximum °C (°F)	7.6 (45.7)	11.0 (51.8)	15.9 (60.6)	22.4 (72.3)	27.6 (81.7)	31.4 (88.5)	32.0 (89.6)	31.1 (88.0)	27.2 (81.0)	22.4 (72.3)	15.7 (60.3)	9.8 (49.6)	21.2 (70.1)
Daily mean °C (°F)	1.9 (35.4)	5.0 (41.0)	10.0 (50.0)	16.0 (60.8)	21.3 (70.3)	25.7 (78.3)	27.3 (81.1)	26.2 (79.2)	21.8 (71.2)	16.3 (61.3)	9.8 (49.6)	3.9 (39.0)	15.4 (59.8)
Mean daily minimum °C (°F)	−2.3 (27.9)	0.3 (32.5)	5.0 (41.0)	10.5 (50.9)	15.8 (60.4)	20.8 (69.4)	23.5 (74.3)	22.6 (72.7)	17.9 (64.2)	12.0 (53.6)	5.3 (41.5)	−0.5 (31.1)	10.9 (51.6)
Record low °C (°F)	−12.1 (10.2)	−9.2 (15.4)	−5.3 (22.5)	0.1 (32.2)	3.8 (38.8)	12.9 (55.2)	16.4 (61.5)	14.2 (57.6)	8.6 (47.5)	−1.6 (29.1)	−6.4 (20.5)	−14.3 (6.3)	−14.3 (6.3)
Average precipitation mm (inches)	12.6 (0.50)	14.0 (0.55)	32.4 (1.28)	50.1 (1.97)	78.3 (3.08)	89.9 (3.54)	146.8 (5.78)	127.4 (5.02)	78.3 (3.08)	57.0 (2.24)	33.8 (1.33)	11.6 (0.46)	732.2 (28.83)
Average precipitation days (≥ 0.1 mm)	4.8	5.2	7.1	8.4	9.2	9.1	12.0	11.5	10.3	9.3	6.8	4.6	98.3
Average snowy days	3.8	2.9	0.9	0	0	0	0	0	0	0	0.7	1.8	10.1
Average relative humidity (%)	70	68	70	72	69	70	82	82	78	75	74	70	73
Mean monthly sunshine hours	105.3	107.1	140.7	170.8	171.5	161.0	160.0	163.9	131.9	129.8	124.4	119.4	1,685.8
Percentage possible sunshine	33	34	38	44	40	38	37	40	36	37	40	39	38
Source: China Meteorological Administration

== Transport ==
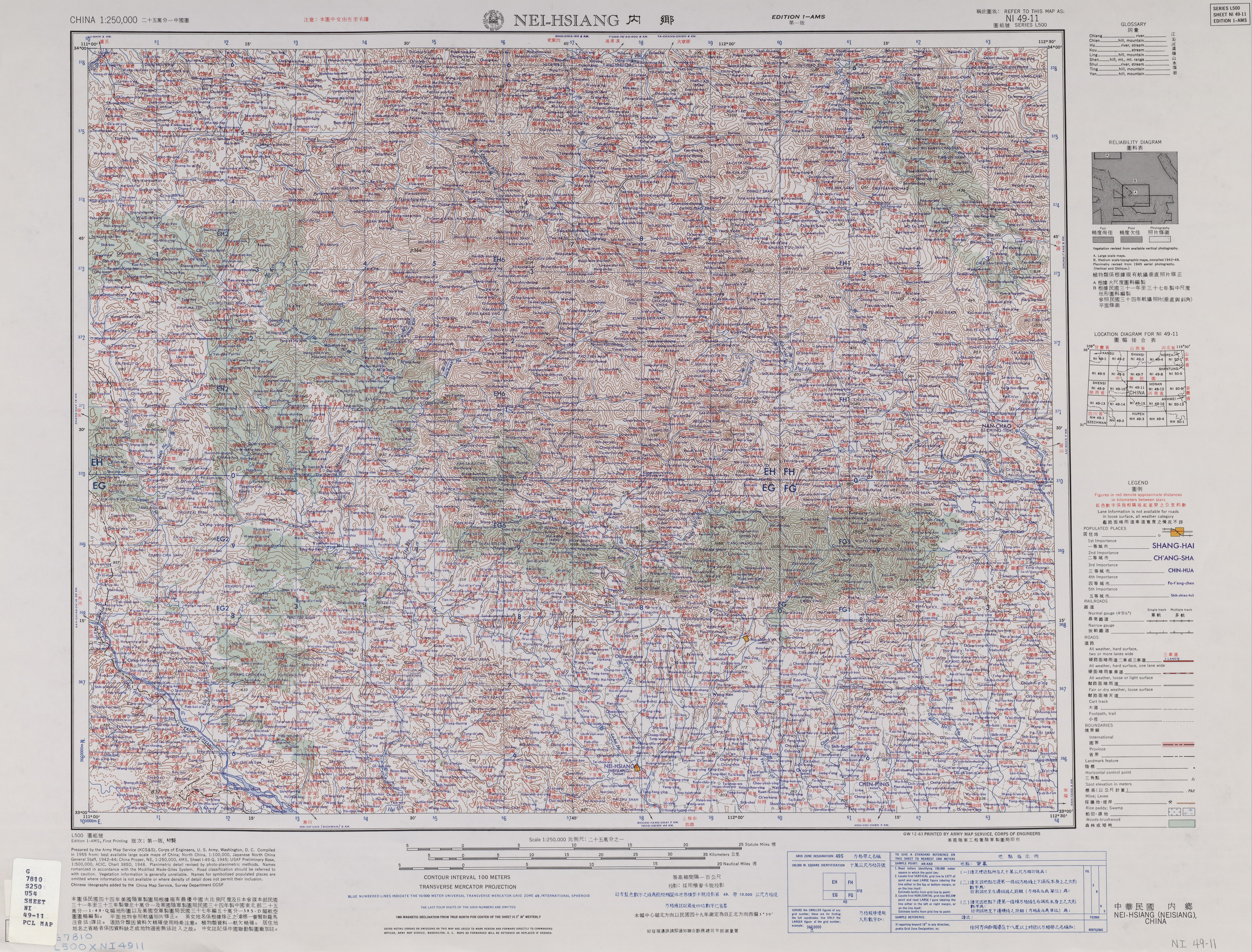
Map including Neixiang (labeled as NEI-HSIANG (NEISIANG) (walled) 內鄉) (AMS, 1955)

- China National Highway 312

== Cultural Heritage ==
=== Intangible Cultural Heritage ===
- The Legend of Baotianman

Baotianman is located at the southern foot of Funiu Mountain, 800 miles away, in the deep mountains north of Xiaguan, Neixiang County. Here, the sun is blocked by the forest sea, the foggy mountains are surrounded by clouds, and the towering peaks are 1,840 meters above sea level, making people feel like they are in a fairyland.

"The Legend of Baotianman" begins with the loyal love between Dabao and Manzhu. Dabao and Manzhu are childhood sweethearts. Although their identities are very different, as time goes by and time passes, they finally get married after the hardships and twists of life. The couple considers the mountains as their home and the peaks as their companions. They plant trees, flowers, and protect birds and animals here year after year, decorating Baotianman into a fairyland on earth. In order to commemorate this loving couple who benefited the people, later generations combined their names and named the beautiful landscape in this area "Baotianman", which has been passed down and is still in use today.

The simple, natural and sincere legends in the legend symbolize the broad-mindedness of the people in the countryside to protect the environment, love labor, and coexist harmoniously with nature. They have considerable ideological, artistic and positive educational significance. At the same time, it also enriches the cultural connotation of Baotianman tourist attractions, and plays an important role in building the Baotianman brand and increasing the popularity of the inner township.

=== Cultural Heritage ===
- Neixiang County Government

Neixiang County Government was first built in the eighth year of Dade in the Yuan Dynasty (1304), covering an area of more than 20,000 square meters. It has been destroyed and rebuilt many times through the Yuan, Ming, Qing and other historical dynasties. There are more than 280 existing buildings, most of which were built in the Qing Dynasty. During the reign of Emperor Guangxu, Zhang Bingtao, the magistrate of the fifth grade county, presided over the construction.

Neixiang County Government is located in the center of the county. It is the most complete county-level government office in the feudal era in China. The Neixiang County Government is known overseas for its historical and artistic value, unique architectural features, and detailed cultural relics and historical materials. It has an extensive archives and is a popular tourist attraction.

- Neixiang Confucian Temple

Also known as the Confucius Temple, it is located on the north side of Datong Road in the southeast of the county seat, facing south to the north. It is 10 meters long from north to south and 45 meters wide from east to west, with a total area of 450 square meters and a construction area of 790 square meters. On November 21, 1986, the Henan Provincial People's Government announced it as the second batch of provincial-level cultural relics protection units. Although Dacheng Hall in the Neixiang Confucian Temple was built in the Ming Dynasty, most of it inherited the architectural style of the Yuan Dynasty. It is a physical material for studying the evolution of wooden architecture in the Yuan and Ming Dynasties.

- Xiaohe Site

The Xiaohe Site is a Neolithic site with Yangshao and Qujialing cultures, located in Zhangtang Village, 3 kilometers southeast of Chimei Town in the north of Neixiang County. The entire site is irregularly rectangular, measuring 340 meters from east to west and 180 meters from north to south, with a total area of approximately 60000 square meters. Due to the fact that the site has not been excavated, only from the cross-section around the site, a large number of ash pits have been exposed, including foundations, red burnt soil, stone tools, pottery pieces, and animal bones.

The discovery of the Xiaohe site has high historical scientific research value for the cultural development sequence of the Neolithic Age in the Central Plains, especially in southwestern Henan.
