= Pei Zhenhua =

Chinese businessman

- 裴振华
- Born: 1959; Jiangsu, China
- Education: China Europe International Business School
- Occupations: Businessman, investor
- Known for: Founder and chairman of Tianhua New Energy; early investor in CATL

Pei Zhenhua (Chinese: 裴振华; born 1959) is a Chinese billionaire businessman and investor. He is the founder and chairman of Suzhou Tianhua Ultra-Clean Technology Co., Ltd. (Chinese: 苏州天华超净科技股份有限公司), later rebranded Tianhua New Energy (Chinese: 天华新能). He is best known as an early outside investor in Contemporary Amperex Technology Co., Limited (CATL), the world's largest manufacturer of electric-vehicle batteries.

Forbes' 2026 Billionaires list placed his net worth at approximately US$15 billion (ranked around #208 globally).
