= Jiang Rensheng =

Chinese businessman

- Born: 1953 or 1954 (age 71–72)
- Occupation: Businessman
- Title: Chairman, Zhifei
- Children: 1

Jiang Rensheng (Chinese: 蒋仁生; pinyin: Jiǎng Rénshēng) is a Chinese billionaire businessman, and the chairman of Zhifei, a vaccine manufacturer. As of September 2021, Forbes estimated his net worth at US$21 billion.

== Career ==
Jiang started work as a primary school teacher, and was then a government health official, before starting his own company.

In June 2020, shares of Chongqing Zhifei Biological Products Co. had risen by 80% due to the approved clinical human testing of a COVID-19 vaccine. According to the Bloomberg Billionaires Index, the gains increased Jiang Rensheng's fortune to $19.4 billion, placing him on the verge of joining the elite club of China's 10 wealthiest individuals.

== Personal life ==
Jiang is married, with one child, and lives in Chongqing, China.
