= Camrelizumab =

Pharmaceutical drug

Monoclonal antibody
- Type: Whole antibody
- Source: Humanized
- Target: PD1

Clinical data
- Other names: SHR-1210
- ATC code: L01FF14 (WHO)

Identifiers
- CAS Number: 1798286-48-2
- DrugBank: DB14776
- UNII: 73096E137E
- KEGG: D13234

Camrelizumab (INN; development code SHR-1210) is an anti-PD-1 immune checkpoint inhibitor that is being investigated for the treatment of hepatocellular carcinoma, Hodgkin lymphoma, and the squamous cell form of esophageal carcinoma..

The drug is being developed by Jiangsu HengRui Medicine Co., Ltd. As of 2019, camrelizumab is undergoing Phase II/III trials.

Camrelizumab was approved in Russia in November 2024 under the brand name Areima. Its approved indications include certain forms of esophageal cancer, nasopharyngeal carcinoma, NSCLC, and TNBC.

In China, in May 2025 camrelizumab was conditionally approved for use in combination with famitinib for the treatment of recurrent or metastatic cervical cancer in patients who have failed prior platinum-based chemotherapy and have not received prior bevacizumab.

Two other studies, also conducted in China, evaluated The efficacy of camrelizumab in treating patients suffering from locally advanced but not metastatic esophageal squamous cell carcinoma. The randomized phase 3 ESCORT-NEO/NCCES01 trial of 391 patients with non-metastatic esophageal squamous cell carcinoma reported that treatment with camrelizumab plus cisplatinum and protein-bound paclitaxel showed a complete response rate of 28% while treatment with cisplatinum plus protein-paclitaxel showed a complete respnse rate of 15.4% and treatmen with chemotherapy alone had a complete response rate of 4.7%. The REVO, NCT05007145 study compared the effectiveness of treating patients suffering from locally advanced but not metastatic esophageal squamous cell carcinoma with either camrelizumab plus cisplatinu] and Protein-bound paclitaxel (52 patients) or radiotherapy plus cisplatinum and protein-bound paclitaxel (51 patients). The study found that the two regimens gave similar pathologically-based complete response rates. One year disease-free survivals for the two groups were respectively 89.1% and 78.2%, the 1 year overall survivals were respectively 100% and 92.3%, surgical complications were reported respectively in 31.1% and 35.9% of patients, and adverse treatment-related events in patients with grade 3 grade 4 esophageal squamous cell carcinomas treeatment-related advere events were respectively 19.2% and 33.3%. The study concluded that the two regimens were similarly effective in treating esophageal squamous cell carcinmoa squounce the disease but the camrelizumab-based regimen had a more favorable safety profile than the radiotherapy-based regimen.
