= Longfor Properties =

Chinese investment holding company

Longfor Properties Co. Ltd (龙湖地产股份有限公司) is an investment holding company, and part of the Forbes Global 2000 companies, at number 345 in the 2019 list. It manages numerous subsidiaries which are involved in property investment, development and management in China as well as relative services. As of December 2011, the total land property of the company was 33.76 million square meters, with major subsidiaries being Beijing Huicheng Investment Limited and Beijing Longhu Properties Company Limited. Wu Yajun is the co-founder, CEO and Chairwoman of Longfor Properties.

The company founded in Chongqing, headquartered in Beijing, with a market cap of US$8.62 billion and 7,374 employees. Products include high-rise apartment buildings, luxury villas, office buildings, residential buildings, business complexes and large scale shopping malls. The company has operations in Beijing, Changzhou, Chengdu, Chongqing, Hangzhou, Qingdao, Shenyang, Shanghai, Xi'an and Wuxi.
