= Foshan Haitian Flavouring & Food Co =

Chinese sauce manufacturer

Foshan Haitian Flavouring & Food Co. Ltd
- Native name: 佛山市海天調味食品股份有限公司
- Type: Public
- Traded as: SSE: 603288 (A share); SEHK: 3288 (H share)
- Industry: Food industry
- Founded: 1955 (71 years ago)
- Headquarters: Foshan, Guangdong, China
- Revenue: ▲CN¥28.87 billion (US$4.13 billion, FY2025)
- Number of employees: 9,160 (FY2025)
- Website: www.haday.com/en/

Foshan Haitian Flavouring & Food Co. Ltd (Chinese: 海天味业) is a Chinese public company that manufactures sauces and flavourings. It is the largest manufacturer of soy sauce in the world.

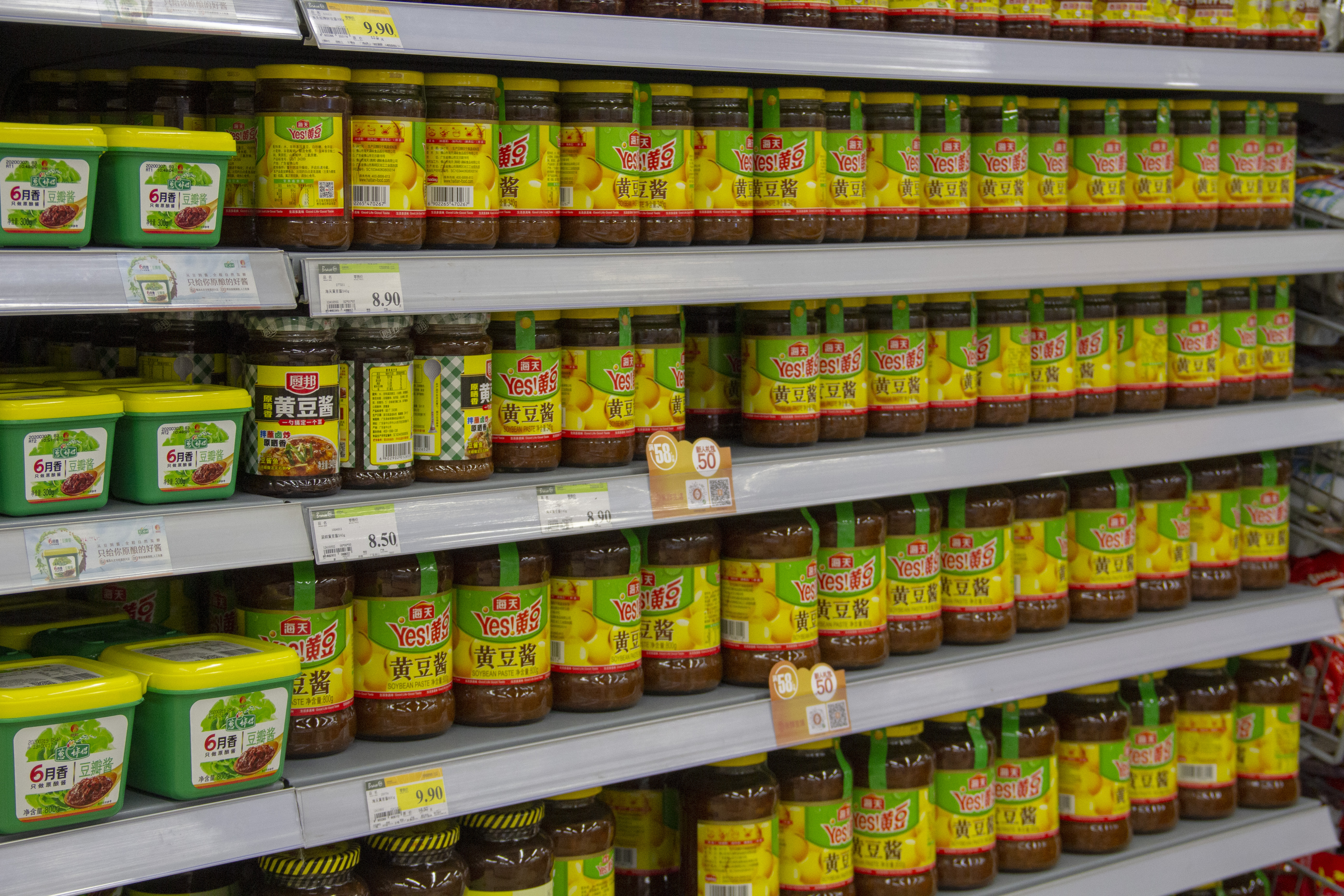
Haitian fermented bean paste

== Operations ==
It is based in Guangdong. The chairman is Pang Kang. Sales in 2012 were around seven billion yuan.

In 2010, it held 16 to 19 percent of the Chinese soy sauce market. Its major competitors included Kikkoman and Lee Kum Kee. The company also manufactures other sauces and condiments such as oyster, hoisin, shrimp and vinegar.

== History ==
The company was established in the seventeenth century as a group of sauce factories in Foshan.

In 2007, it was bought out by its employees from the government of Foshan. In 2014, it underwent an IPO on the Shanghai Stock Exchange in order to raise funds for expansion. The company raised 3.84 billion yuan after selling 74.85 million shares.

== See also ==
- List of Chinese sauces
