= Shizhu Tujia Autonomous County =

Shizhu 石柱县 Shihchu
- Autonomous County
- 石柱土家族自治县; Shizhu Tujia Autonomous County
- Location of Shizhu County in Chongqing
- Coordinates: 29°59′45″N 108°06′29″E
- Country: China
- Municipality: Chongqing
- County seat: Nanbin Subdistrict

Area
  - Total: 3,012.51 km^{2} (1,163.14 sq mi)

Population (2020 census)
  - Total: 389,001
  - Density: 129.129/km^{2} (334.441/sq mi)
- Time zone: UTC+8 (China Standard)
- Website: cqszx.gov.cn

Shizhu Tujia Autonomous County (Chinese: 石柱土家族自治县; pinyin: Shízhù Tǔjiāzú Zìzhìxiàn), or Shizhu County for short, is located in southeastern Chongqing, China. It is south of the Yangtze River, and borders the Chongqing divisions of Pengshui County to the south, Fengdu County to the southwest, Zhong County to the northwest and Wanzhou District to the north; to the east, it borders the Hubei county-level city of Lichuan. It's in the center zone of Three Gorges Reservoir Region, and the only autonomous county which designated for only one of ethnic minorities in this region. (Chongqing Municipality has four counties that designated for ethnic minorities but because the other three counties are designated for more than one of ethnic minorities, this autonomous county is only one which is designated for only one of ethnic minotiry.)

== Name ==
The Male (Right) and Female (Left) Stone Pillars

Shizhu literally means "Stone Pillars", which is named after two big human-like natural stone pillars standing on Wanshou Mountain. The two stone pillars were once a loving couple in a native "Romeo and Juliet" style love story. To fight against feudal oppression of free love, they died together tragically, and turned into two stone pillars standing face-to-face on Wanshou Mountain, never to be apart again.

== History ==
On June 4, 2018, the Ministry of Ecology and Environment criticized local government officials from Shizhu for allowing an industrial park to encroach onto protected nature reserves.

== Geography ==
Shizhu County covers 3,010 km^{2} (1,160 sq mi) with 856,200 mu park and farm land. By the end of 1992, the population of Shizhu County had increased up to 462,100, of whom 424,900 are the rural residents of Shizhu County. The existing capital of the County is Nanbin Subdistrict which will not be involved in the submersion of the water storage of the reservoir region of the Three Gorges Project. Shizhu County is located in the subtropical monsoon zone with the clear seasons. It is warm and wet with enough rain.

== Administrative divisions ==
The county administers 3 subdistricts, 17 towns, and 13 townships.

- Nanbin Subdistrict (南宾街道)
- Wan'an Subdistrict (万安街道)
- Xialu Subdistrict (下路街道)
- Xituo Town (西沱镇)
- Yuelai Town (悦崃镇)
- Linxi Town (临溪镇)
- Huangshui Town (黄水镇)
- Mawu Town (马武镇)
- Shazi Town (沙子镇)
- Wangchang Town (王场镇)
- Yanxi Town (沿溪镇)
- Longsha Town (龙沙镇)
- Yuchi Town (鱼池镇)
- Sanhe Town (三河镇)
- Daxie Town (大歇镇)
- Qiaotou Town (桥头镇)
- Wanchao Town (万朝镇)
- Lengshui Town (冷水镇)
- Huanghe Town (黄鹤镇)
- Fengmu Town (枫木镇)
- Lichang Township (黎场乡)
- Sanxing Township (三星乡)
- Liutang Township (六塘乡)
- Sanyi Township (三益乡)
- Wangjia Township (王家乡)
- Hezui Township (河嘴乡)
- Shijia Township (石家乡)
- Zhongyi Township (中益乡)
- Xixin Township (洗新乡)
- Longtan Township (龙潭乡)
- Xinle Township (新乐乡)
- Jinling Township (金铃乡)
- Jinzhu Township (金竹乡)

== Climate ==
Climate data for Shizhu, elevation 632 m (2,073 ft), (1991–2020 normals, extremes 1981–2010)
Month	Jan	Feb	Mar	Apr	May	Jun	Jul	Aug	Sep	Oct	Nov	Dec	Year
Record high °C (°F)	21.3 (70.3)	27.9 (82.2)	33.4 (92.1)	35.9 (96.6)	36.3 (97.3)	37.3 (99.1)	38.7 (101.7)	40.1 (104.2)	39.1 (102.4)	34.3 (93.7)	26.9 (80.4)	22.1 (71.8)	40.1 (104.2)
Mean daily maximum °C (°F)	9.3 (48.7)	12.5 (54.5)	17.9 (64.2)	22.5 (72.5)	25.7 (78.3)	28.5 (83.3)	32.5 (90.5)	33.2 (91.8)	27.5 (81.5)	21.6 (70.9)	16.4 (61.5)	10.7 (51.3)	21.5 (70.7)
Daily mean °C (°F)	5.7 (42.3)	8.0 (46.4)	12.3 (54.1)	16.6 (61.9)	20.2 (68.4)	23.1 (73.6)	26.2 (79.2)	26.1 (79.0)	22.0 (71.6)	17.0 (62.6)	12.1 (53.8)	7.0 (44.6)	16.4 (61.5)
Mean daily minimum °C (°F)	3.4 (38.1)	5.2 (41.4)	8.6 (47.5)	12.7 (54.9)	16.5 (61.7)	19.7 (67.5)	22.1 (71.8)	21.7 (71.1)	18.8 (65.8)	14.3 (57.7)	9.6 (49.3)	4.7 (40.5)	13.1 (55.6)
Record low °C (°F)	−3.2 (26.2)	−2.8 (27.0)	−1.5 (29.3)	4.9 (40.8)	8.9 (48.0)	13.6 (56.5)	15.4 (59.7)	16.1 (61.0)	12.3 (54.1)	5.2 (41.4)	0.2 (32.4)	−4.0 (24.8)	−4.0 (24.8)
Average precipitation mm (inches)	15.1 (0.59)	19.3 (0.76)	46.8 (1.84)	106.7 (4.20)	155.8 (6.13)	154.2 (6.07)	140.7 (5.54)	133.6 (5.26)	106.2 (4.18)	88.6 (3.49)	51.8 (2.04)	17.3 (0.68)	1,036.1 (40.78)
Average precipitation days (≥ 0.1 mm)	8.7	8.5	12.3	15.1	16.8	15.7	14.3	13.8	12.3	15.7	11.5	9.6	154.3
Average snowy days	1.9	0.7	0.1	0	0	0	0	0	0	0	0	0.5	3.2
Average relative humidity (%)	79	76	76	78	80	81	78	76	79	83	82	81	79
Mean monthly sunshine hours	45.7	51.9	86.1	114.1	118.5	116.8	179.8	196.9	132.9	82.7	74.2	53.4	1,253
Percentage possible sunshine	14	16	23	29	28	28	42	48	27	24	23	17	27
Source: China Meteorological Administration

== Resources ==
The forests cover 10.97% of the total area of Shizhu County. There are many precious varieties of trees in the forests, such as metasequoias, tricuspid trees, ormosia firs and ginkgos. There are also more than 50 varieties of trees in the territories of the county for production purposes, such as tung trees and mulberries. In addition, there are more than 170 varieties of wild animals in the forests of the county such as tigers, leopards, otters and wild boars. One can also see more than 10 varieties of edible mushrooms, such as xianggu mushrooms, edible fungus and zhusun mushrooms. In addition, there are various Chinese medical herbs such as Coptis chinensis and Gastrodia elata. Shizhu County is particularly famous for Coptis chinensis and the Chinese people usually call it the home town of Coptis chinensis. More than 20 varieties of ores have been found in Shizhu County, such as coal, natural gas, copper, iron, silver, cadmium, lead, gold and barite.

== Three Gorges Reservoir Region ==
4 townships, 26 villages and 16 fabrication/ ore-mining enterprises have been/ will have been involved in the submersion of the reservoir water storage of the Three Gorges Project. Shizhu County is involved in the submersion of the reservoir water storage of the Three Gorges Project as follows. · The emigrants living below the water level of the reservoir storage of the Three Gorges Project are 8,400 in Shizhu County; · The houses/ buildings with the total construction area of 329,700 m² have been/ will have been submerged; · 6900 mu citrus and farm land has been/ will have been submerged, representing 4.59% of the total area of citrus and farm land in Shizhu County; · 10 km (6.2 mi) highways have been/ will have been submerged; · The relocation compensation investment is 272 million RMB yuan.
