= Dang Yanbao =

Chinese billionaire businessman

- Born: 1973 (age 52–53)
- Education: Peking University (MBA)

Dang Yanbao (born 1973) is a Chinese entrepreneur and a chairman of the Ningxia Baofeng Energy Group. In 2010, he became a legal representative of the Ningxia Baofeng Group Co., Ltd. In 2020, the Baofeng Group was ranked 307 among the top 2020 private manufacturing enterprises in China.

Dang Yanbao grew up in Yanchi County. Later he obtained an M.B.A degree from Peking University. He is also a philanthropist. In 2011, his wife Bian Haiyan and he established the Ningxia Yanbao Charity Foundation that aimed at sponsoring education and poverty alleviation. In 2019, Dang Yanbao donated RMB 302 million to Ningxia Yanbao Charity Foundation. As of 2021, the foundation has helped 256,700 young students financially.

Dang Yanbao made the 2022 Forbes Billionaires List with an estimated wealth of $14.8 billion and occupied the 126th position.
