= Jiangsu Hengrui =

Chinese pharmaceutical company

Jiangsu Hengrui Pharmaceuticals Co. Ltd
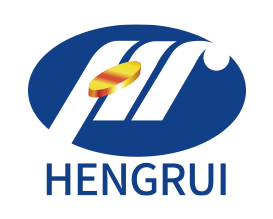

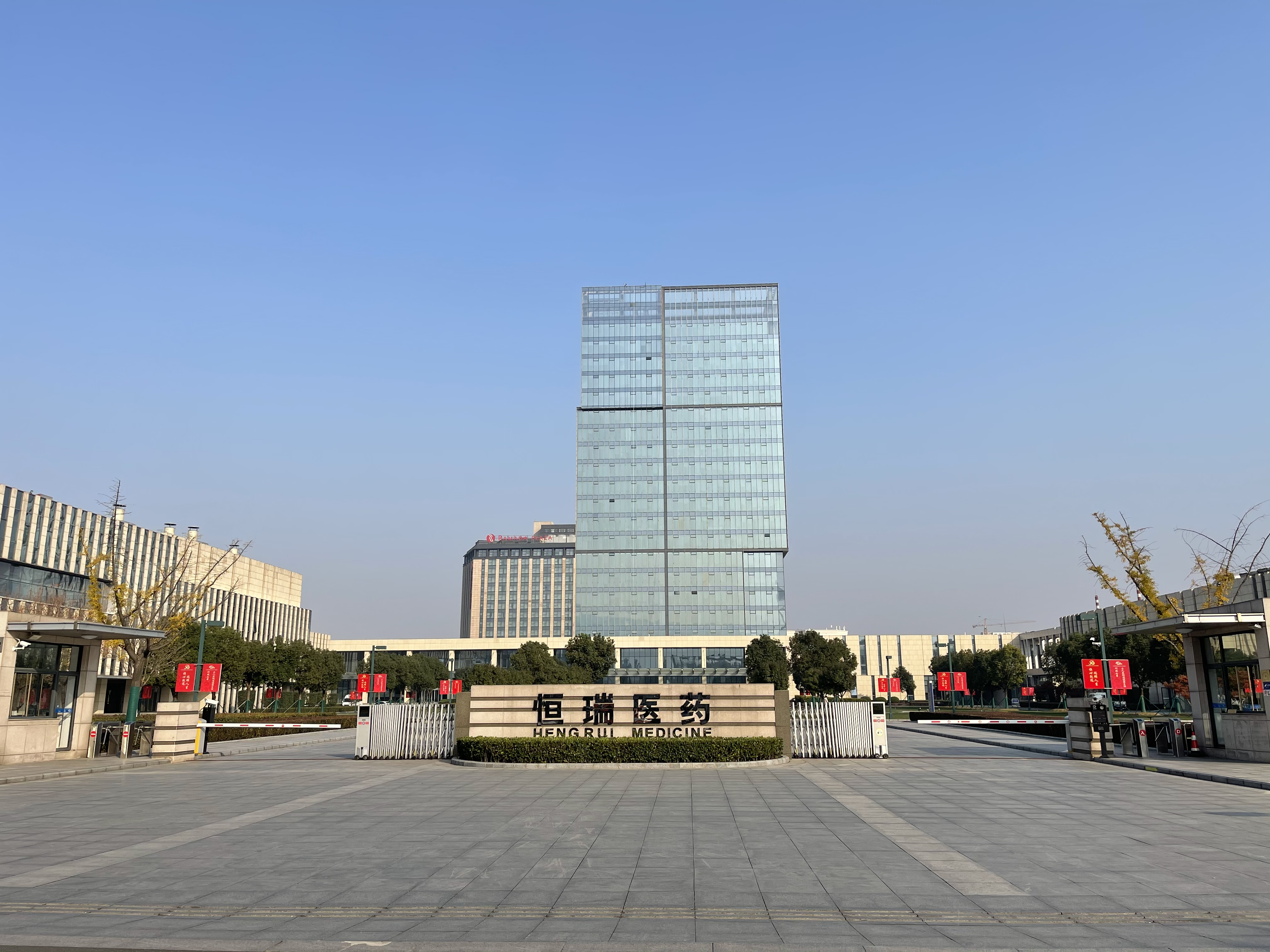
- Headquarters in Lianyungang
- Type: Public company
- Traded as: SSE: 600276; CSI A50; SEHK: 1276
- Industry: Pharmaceuticals
- Founded: 1997
- Headquarters: Lianyungang, Jiangsu, China
- Area served: China; Global
- Key people: Sun Piaoyang (chairman)
- Number of employees: 24,500 (2020)
- Website: www.hengrui.com

Jiangsu Hengrui Pharmaceuticals Company Ltd. (Chinese: 江苏恒瑞医药股份有限公司), also known as Jiangsu Hengrui (Chinese: 恒瑞医药), is a Chinese pharmaceutical company that manufactures and distributes various types of drug packaging materials, cancer-treating antineoplastics, cardiovascular medication, painkillers, antibiotics, and related products. It is the largest listed pharmaceutical company in China.

== History ==
Founded in 1970, Jiangsu Hengrui Pharmaceuticals was originally state-owned and called Lianyungang Pharmaceutical Factory (Chinese: 连云港制药厂). Headquartered in Lianyungang, Jiangsu, it was established in its current form in 1977. The company was listed on the Shanghai Stock Exchange in 2000 and now has locations in China, the United States, Germany, Switzerland, Japan, and Australia.

== Research and development ==
In 2020, Jiangsu Hengrui Pharmaceuticals set up research and development offices in Princeton, New Jersey, and in Basel, Switzerland. The Swiss-based Hengrui Europe Therapeutics AG also hosts the discovery research and development units. Their focus is on protein engineering and the mRNA technology platform.

Since December 2020, Jiangsu Hengrui Pharmaceuticals has run clinical trials on anti-cancer drugs such as:

- An anti-PD-1 immune checkpoint inhibitor camrelizumab for hepatocellular carcinoma;
- A nonsteroidal antiandrogen rezvilutamide for prostate cancer;
- A PARP inhibitor fluzoparib for solid cancers, especially prostate cancer;
- A VEGFR2 inhibitor apatinib as a combination therapy.

Trials were also performed in the fields of metabolic diseases (e.g., type 2 diabetes), autoimmune diseases (Interleukin-17 receptor blocker vanucizumab in psoriasis), HIV treatment, and analgesia.

== See also ==
- Hansoh Pharmaceutical
