= Zhang Hejun =

Chinese businessman

- Born: Zhang Hejun; 1952 (age 73–74)
- Known for: Chairman of Ningbo Deye Technology

Zhang Hejun (Chinese: 张和君; born 1952) is a Chinese billionaire businessman who founded inverter manufacturer Ningbo Deye Technology which went public on the Shanghai Stock Exchange in 2021.

Forbes lists his net worth as of August 2026 at $10.2 billion USD.

Hejun started his first business venture at 17 year old; Initially engaged in the mold business, later transitioning to hardware, and subsequently delving into plastic components. The founder’s early-established company operated under multiple names until 1990 that “Deye” was formally established. The company that went public in 2021 is named “Deye Corporation.”
