= Cuiping Subdistrict, Qixia =

Cuiping Subdistrict 翠屏街道
- Subdistrict
- Location in Shandong
- Coordinates: 37°17′53″N 120°49′8″E
- Country: People's Republic of China
- Province: Shandong
- Prefecture-level city: Yantai
- County-level city: Qixia
- Time zone: UTC+8 (China Standard)

Cuiping Subdistrict (Chinese: 翠屏街道; pinyin: Cuìpíng Jiēdào) is a subdistrict in Qixia, Shandong, China. As of 2020, it administers the following 58 villages:

- Chengguan Village (城关村)
- Chengdonggou Village (城东沟村)
- Dawuzikuang Village (大雾滋夼村)
- Xiaowuzikuang Village (小雾滋夼村)
- Wanjiagou Village (万家沟村)
- Nandingjiagou Village (南丁家沟村)
- Nansanlidian Village (南三里店村)
- Nan'erlidian Village (南二里店村)
- Zaoxing Village (枣行村)
- Linjiating Village (林家亭村)
- Xiaodonggou Village (小东沟村)
- Xi'erlidian Village (西二里店村)
- Xisanlidian Village (西三里店村)
- Nanlinjiazhuang Village (南林家庄村)
- Shijiazhuang Village (石家庄村)
- Wulihou Village (五里后村)
- Nansongjiagou Village (南宋家沟村)
- Nanqilizhuang Village (南七里庄村)
- Shilizhuang Village (十里庄村)
- Muxianzhuang Village (慕先庄村)
- Yulinzhuang Village (榆林庄村)
- Wawu Village (瓦屋村)
- Guoluozhuang Village (郭落庄村)
- Daxiazhi Village (大霞址村)
- Xiaoxiazhi Village (小霞址村)
- Xiaoliukou Village (小流口村)
- Daliukou Village (大流口村)
- Dianxigou Village (店西沟村)
- Dongnandian Village (东南店村)
- Nanshicha Village (南石岔村)
- Laolongwan Village (老龙湾村)
- Yejiabu Village (业家埠村)
- Dalingshan Village (大灵山村)
- Xiaolingshan Village (小灵山村)
- Beikuang Village (北夼村)
- Shangqujia Village (上曲家村)
- Shangliujia Village (上刘家村)
- Luojiazhuang Village (罗家庄村)
- Lilin Village (栗林村)
- Heidoupeng Village (黑陡硼村)
- Shijia Village (十甲村)
- Houzhangjiazhuang Village (后张家庄村)
- Huangyandi Village (黄燕底村)
- Moujiazhuang Village (牟家庄村)
- Shihezi Village (石盒子村)
- Shangsunjia Village (上孙家村)
- Yijiapozi Village (衣家泊子村)
- Liujiahe Village (刘家河村)
- Huangjiazhuang Village (黄家庄村)
- Qiliqiao Village (七里桥村)
- Houyangwo Village (后阳窝村)
- Qianyangwo Village (前阳窝村)
- Xiaohebei Village (小河北村)
- Dahebei Village (大河北村)
- Fuzeng Village (釜甑村)
- Dongfuyuan Village (东富源村)
- Xifuyuan Village (西富源村)
- Nanfuyuan Village (南富源村)

== See also ==
- List of township-level divisions of Shandong
