= CSI 300 Index =

Stock market index in China

- Operator: China Securities Index Company
- Exchanges: Shanghai Stock Exchange; Shenzhen Stock Exchange
- Trading symbol: SSE: 000300; SZSE: 399300
- Constituents: 300
- Type: large to medium cap
Related indices
| CSI 100 Index | (sub-index) |
| CSI 200 Index | (sub-index) |
- Website: www.csindex.com.cn#/indices/family/detail?indexCode=000300

The CSI 300 (Chinese: 沪深300; pinyin: Hù Shēn Sānbǎi) is a capitalization-weighted stock market index designed to replicate the performance of the top 300 stocks traded on the Shanghai Stock Exchange and the Shenzhen Stock Exchange. It has two sub-indexes: the CSI 100 Index and the CSI 200 Index. Over the years, it has been deemed the Chinese counterpart of the S&P 500 index and a better gauge of the Chinese stock market than the more traditional SSE Composite Index.

The index is compiled by the China Securities Index Company, Ltd.

It has been calculated since April 8, 2005. Its value is normalized relative to a base of 1000 on December 31, 2004.

It is considered to be a blue chip index for Mainland China stock exchanges.

== Annual Returns ==
The following table shows the annual development of the CSI 300 Index since 2005.

| Year | Closing level | Change in Index in Points | Change in Index in % |
|---|---|---|---|
| 2005 | 923.45 | | |
| 2006 | 2,041.05 | 1,117.60 | 121.02 |
| 2007 | 5,338.28 | 3,297.23 | 161.55 |
| 2008 | 1,817.72 | −3,520.56 | −65.95 |
| 2009 | 3,575.68 | 1,757.96 | 96.71 |
| 2010 | 3,128.26 | −447.42 | −12.51 |
| 2011 | 2,345.74 | −782.52 | −25.01 |
| 2012 | 2,522.95 | 177.21 | 7.55 |
| 2013 | 2,330.03 | −192.92 | −7.65 |
| 2014 | 3,533.71 | 1,203.68 | 51.66 |
| 2015 | 3,731.00 | 197.29 | 5.58 |
| 2016 | 3,310.08 | −420.92 | −11.28 |
| 2017 | 4,030.85 | 720.77 | 21.78 |
| 2018 | 3,010.65 | −1,020.20 | −25.31 |
| 2019 | 4,096.58 | 1,085.93 | 36.07 |
| 2020 | 5,211.29 | 1,114.71 | 27.21 |
| 2021 | 4,940.37 | −270.92 | −5.20 |
| 2022 | 3,871.64 | −1068.73 | −21.63 |
| 2023 | 3,431.11 | −440.53 | −11.38 |
| 2024 | 3,934.91 | +503.80 | 14.68 |

== Constituents ==
As of 8 March 2024

| Ticker | Company | Segment | Exchange | Weighting (%) |
|---|---|---|---|---|
| SSE: 600519 | Kweichow Moutai | Consumer Staples | Shanghai | 5.972 |
| SSE: 601318 | Ping An Insurance | Financials | Shanghai | 2.59 |
| SZSE: 300750 | CATL | Industrials | Shenzhen | 2.421 |
| SSE: 600036 | China Merchants Bank | Financials | Shanghai | 2.225 |
| SZSE: 000333 | Midea Group | Consumer Discretionary | Shenzhen | 1.727 |
| SZSE: 000858 | Wuliangye Yibin | Consumer Staples | Shenzhen | 1.549 |
| SSE: 600900 | China Yangtze Power | Utilities | Shanghai | 1.375 |
| SSE: 601166 | Industrial Bank | Financials | Shanghai | 1.358 |
| SSE: 601899 | Zijin Mining Group | Materials | Shanghai | 1.211 |
| SSE: 600030 | CITIC Securities | Financials | Shanghai | 1.166 |
| SSE: 600276 | Jiangsu Hengrui Medicine | Health Care | Shanghai | 1.068 |
| SSE: 601398 | Industrial and Commercial Bank of China | Financials | Shanghai | 1.048 |
| SSE: 600887 | Inner Mongolia Yili Industrial Group | Consumer Staples | Shanghai | 1.012 |
| SZSE: 300059 | East Money | Financials | Shenzhen | 0.999 |
| SZSE: 000651 | Gree Electric | Consumer Discretionary | Shenzhen | 0.987 |
| SZSE: 300760 | Mindray | Health Care | Shenzhen | 0.983 |
| SZSE: 002594 | BYD | Consumer Discretionary | Shenzhen | 0.972 |
| SSE: 601328 | Bank of Communications | Financials | Shanghai | 0.966 |
| SSE: 600309 | Wanhua Chemical Group | Materials | Shanghai | 0.841 |
| SZSE: 000725 | BOE Technology Group | Information Technology | Shenzhen | 0.839 |
| SSE: 600919 | Bank of Jiangsu | Financials | Shanghai | 0.79 |
| SZSE: 002475 | Luxshare Precision Industry | Information Technology | Shenzhen | 0.774 |
| SZSE: 300124 | Shenzhen Inovance Technology | Industrials | Shenzhen | 0.757 |
| SSE: 601288 | Agricultural Bank of China | Financials | Shanghai | 0.75 |
| SZSE: 002415 | Hangzhou Hikvision Digital Technology | Information Technology | Shenzhen | 0.732 |
| SZSE: 000568 | Luzhou Lao Jiao | Consumer Staples | Shenzhen | 0.726 |
| SSE: 601012 | Longi Green Energy Technology | Information Technology | Shanghai | 0.722 |
| SSE: 601088 | China Shenhua Energy | Energy | Shanghai | 0.714 |
| SSE: 601816 | Beijing-Shanghai High Speed Railway | Industrials | Shanghai | 0.696 |
| SSE: 600028 | China Petroleum & Chemical Corporation | Energy | Shanghai | 0.667 |
| SSE: 600809 | Shanxi Xinghuacun Fen Wine Factory | Consumer Staples | Shanghai | 0.638 |
| SSE: 601668 | China State Construction Engineering | Industrials | Shanghai | 0.629 |
| SSE: 603259 | WuXi AppTec | Health Care | Shanghai | 0.627 |
| SZSE: 002714 | Muyuan Foodstuff | Consumer Staples | Shenzhen | 0.59 |
| SZSE: 000001 | Ping An Bank | Financials | Shenzhen | 0.576 |
| SZSE: 300498 | Wens Foodstuff Group | Consumer Staples | Shenzhen | 0.572 |
| SSE: 600016 | China Minsheng Bank | Financials | Shanghai | 0.563 |
| SSE: 601857 | PetroChina | Energy | Shanghai | 0.562 |
| SSE: 601225 | Shaanxi Coal Industry Company | Energy | Shanghai | 0.561 |
| SZSE: 300308 | Zhongji Innolight | Information Technology | Shenzhen | 0.559 |
| SSE: 688981 | Semiconductor Manufacturing International Corporation | Information Technology | Shanghai | 0.535 |
| SZSE: 000063 | ZTE | Information Technology | Shenzhen | 0.534 |
| SSE: 601988 | Bank of China | Financials | Shanghai | 0.528 |
| SZSE: 002352 | S.F. Holding | Industrials | Shenzhen | 0.527 |
| SSE: 600406 | NARI Technology | Industrials | Shanghai | 0.522 |
| SSE: 600941 | China Mobile | Communication | Shanghai | 0.517 |
| SZSE: 000338 | Weichai Power | Industrials | Shenzhen | 0.514 |
| SSE: 600050 | China United Network Communications | Communication | Shanghai | 0.514 |
| SZSE: 002230 | Iflytek | Information Technology | Shenzhen | 0.513 |
| SSE: 600690 | Qingdao Haier | Consumer Discretionary | Shanghai | 0.512 |
| SSE: 601728 | China Telecom Corporation | Communication | Shanghai | 0.51 |
| SZSE: 300274 | Sungrow Power Supply | Industrials | Shenzhen | 0.509 |
| SZSE: 002142 | Bank of Ningbo | Financials | Shenzhen | 0.495 |
| SSE: 600837 | Haitong Securities Company | Financials | Shanghai | 0.495 |
| SZSE: 000792 | Qinghai Salt Lake Potash | Materials | Shenzhen | 0.492 |
| SSE: 601601 | China Pacific Insurance | Financials | Shanghai | 0.492 |
| SZSE: 000100 | TCL Corporation | Information Technology | Shenzhen | 0.477 |
| SSE: 601888 | China International Travel Service | Consumer Discretionary | Shanghai | 0.477 |
| SSE: 600000 | Shanghai Pudong Development Bank | Financials | Shanghai | 0.471 |
| SSE: 600031 | Sany Heavy Industry | Industrials | Shanghai | 0.464 |
| SSE: 601985 | China National Nuclear Power | Utilities | Shanghai | 0.46 |
| SSE: 600150 | China CSSC Holdings | Industrials | Shanghai | 0.445 |
| SSE: 688041 | Hygon Information Technology | Information Technology | Shanghai | 0.444 |
| SSE: 601766 | CRRC Corporation | Industrials | Shanghai | 0.435 |
| SSE: 601169 | Bank of Beijing | Financials | Shanghai | 0.43 |
| SZSE: 002371 | NAURA Technology Group | Information Technology | Shenzhen | 0.422 |
| SSE: 600089 | TBEA | Industrials | Shanghai | 0.422 |
| SSE: 601688 | Huatai Securities | Financials | Shanghai | 0.42 |
| SSE: 601138 | Foxconn Industrial Internet | Information Technology | Shanghai | 0.417 |
| SZSE: 000625 | Chongqing Changan Automobile | Consumer Discretionary | Shenzhen | 0.415 |
| SSE: 600438 | Tongwei Company | Information Technology | Shanghai | 0.402 |
| SSE: 600048 | Poly Real Estate Group | Real Estate | Shanghai | 0.394 |
| SSE: 603501 | Will Semiconductor | Information Technology | Shanghai | 0.393 |
| SSE: 600104 | SAIC Motor | Consumer Discretionary | Shanghai | 0.392 |
| SSE: 600660 | Fuyao Glass Industry Group | Consumer Discretionary | Shanghai | 0.389 |
| SZSE: 000002 | China Vanke | Real Estate | Shenzhen | 0.383 |
| SZSE: 300015 | Aier Eye Hospital | Health Care | Shenzhen | 0.383 |
| SSE: 601211 | Guotai Junan Securities | Financials | Shanghai | 0.382 |
| SSE: 603288 | Foshan Haitian Flavouring & Food Co | Consumer Staples | Shanghai | 0.38 |
| SSE: 600436 | Zhangzhou Pientzehuang Pharmaceutical | Health Care | Shanghai | 0.377 |
| SSE: 601919 | China Cosco Holdings | Industrials | Shanghai | 0.376 |
| SSE: 600905 | China Three Gorges Renewables (Group) | Utilities | Shanghai | 0.371 |
| SSE: 601390 | China Railway Group Limited | Industrials | Shanghai | 0.366 |
| SSE: 601229 | Bank of Shanghai | Financials | Shanghai | 0.364 |
| SZSE: 300122 | Chongqing Zhifei Biological Products | Health Care | Shenzhen | 0.36 |
| SZSE: 002027 | Focus Media Information Technology | Communication | Shenzhen | 0.357 |
| SSE: 688012 | Advanced Micro-Fabrication Equipment | Information Technology | Shanghai | 0.357 |
| SSE: 688111 | Beijing Kingsoft Office Software | Information Technology | Shanghai | 0.351 |
| SSE: 601006 | Daqin Railway | Industrials | Shanghai | 0.343 |
| SZSE: 002304 | Jiangsu Yanghe Brewery Joint-Stock | Consumer Staples | Shenzhen | 0.341 |
| SSE: 601818 | China Everbright Bank | Financials | Shanghai | 0.335 |
| SSE: 600019 | Baoshan Iron and Steel | Materials | Shanghai | 0.331 |
| SSE: 688271 | United Imaging | Health Care | Shanghai | 0.329 |
| SSE: 603019 | Dawning Information Industry | Information Technology | Shanghai | 0.327 |
| SSE: 600585 | Anhui Conch Cement | Materials | Shanghai | 0.322 |
| SZSE: 002050 | ZHEJIANG SANHUA INTELLIGENT CONTROLS | Industrials | Shenzhen | 0.313 |
| SZSE: 002466 | Tianqi Lithium Industries | Materials | Shenzhen | 0.311 |
| SSE: 601658 | Postal Savings Bank of China | Financials | Shanghai | 0.302 |
| SSE: 601989 | China Shipbuilding Industry Company | Industrials | Shanghai | 0.301 |
| SSE: 600938 | CNOOC Limited | Energy | Shanghai | 0.297 |
| SSE: 600999 | China Merchants Securities | Financials | Shanghai | 0.294 |
| SSE: 688036 | Transsion | Information Technology | Shanghai | 0.287 |
| SZSE: 000938 | Unisplendour | Information Technology | Shenzhen | 0.284 |
| SSE: 601628 | China Life Insurance Company | Financials | Shanghai | 0.283 |
| SSE: 603986 | GigaDevice | Information Technology | Shanghai | 0.274 |
| SZSE: 002049 | Unigroup Guoxin Microelectronics | Information Technology | Shenzhen | 0.273 |
| SSE: 601600 | Aluminum Corporation of China Limited | Materials | Shanghai | 0.269 |
| SSE: 600111 | China Northern Rare Earth Group | Materials | Shanghai | 0.268 |
| SSE: 688008 | Montage Technology | Information Technology | Shanghai | 0.267 |
| SZSE: 300014 | Eve Energy | Industrials | Shenzhen | 0.264 |
| SSE: 601939 | China Construction Bank | Financials | Shanghai | 0.264 |
| SSE: 600958 | Orient Securities | Financials | Shanghai | 0.258 |
| SSE: 600893 | AVIC Aviation Engine Corporation | Industrials | Shanghai | 0.257 |
| SZSE: 002460 | Ganfeng Lithium | Materials | Shenzhen | 0.254 |
| SSE: 601009 | Bank of Nanjing | Financials | Shanghai | 0.254 |
| SZSE: 000538 | Yunnan Baiyao Group | Health Care | Shenzhen | 0.251 |
| SSE: 601669 | Power Construction Corporation of China | Industrials | Shanghai | 0.247 |
| SSE: 600009 | Shanghai International Airport | Industrials | Shanghai | 0.246 |
| SZSE: 002129 | Tianjin Zhonghuan Semiconductor | Information Technology | Shenzhen | 0.245 |
| SSE: 603993 | China Molybdenum | Materials | Shanghai | 0.244 |
| SSE: 600886 | SDIC Power Holdings | Utilities | Shanghai | 0.241 |
| SSE: 600760 | AVIC SHENYANG AIRCRAFT COMPANY | Industrials | Shanghai | 0.237 |
| SZSE: 000425 | XCMG Construction Machinery | Industrials | Shenzhen | 0.236 |
| SZSE: 000776 | GF Securities | Financials | Shenzhen | 0.235 |
| SSE: 601916 | China Zheshang Bank | Financials | Shanghai | 0.235 |
| SSE: 600795 | GD Power Development | Utilities | Shanghai | 0.234 |
| SZSE: 000661 | Chang Chun High and New Technology Industry (Group) | Health Care | Shenzhen | 0.233 |
| SZSE: 000166 | Shenwan Hongyuan | Financials | Shenzhen | 0.232 |
| SSE: 600426 | Shandong Hualu-Hengsheng Chemical | Materials | Shanghai | 0.229 |
| SSE: 600015 | Hua Xia Bank | Financials | Shanghai | 0.226 |
| SZSE: 300782 | Maxscend Microelectronics | Information Technology | Shenzhen | 0.225 |
| SSE: 601377 | Industrial Securities | Financials | Shanghai | 0.225 |
| SSE: 601186 | China Railway Construction | Industrials | Shanghai | 0.224 |
| SZSE: 000157 | Zoomlion Heavy Industry Science & Technology | Industrials | Shenzhen | 0.223 |
| SZSE: 002241 | GoerTek | Information Technology | Shenzhen | 0.223 |
| SSE: 600926 | Bank of Hangzhou | Financials | Shanghai | 0.221 |
| SSE: 600547 | Shandong Gold-Mining | Materials | Shanghai | 0.22 |
| SSE: 600011 | Huaneng Power International | Utilities | Shanghai | 0.218 |
| SZSE: 000977 | Inspur Electronic Information Industry | Information Technology | Shenzhen | 0.216 |
| SZSE: 002252 | Shanghai RAAS Blood Products | Health Care | Shenzhen | 0.215 |
| SSE: 600674 | Sichuan Chuantou Energy | Utilities | Shanghai | 0.214 |
| SSE: 603799 | ZHEJIANG HUAYOU COBALT | Materials | Shanghai | 0.213 |
| SSE: 600584 | JCET | Information Technology | Shanghai | 0.21 |
| SSE: 600570 | Hundsun Technologies | Information Technology | Shanghai | 0.208 |
| SZSE: 002236 | Zhejiang Dahua Technology | Information Technology | Shenzhen | 0.205 |
| SZSE: 002179 | AVIC Jonhon Optronic Technology | Information Technology | Shenzhen | 0.204 |
| SZSE: 000596 | Anhui Gujing Distillery | Consumer Staples | Shenzhen | 0.201 |
| SZSE: 002311 | Guangdong Haid Group | Consumer Staples | Shenzhen | 0.201 |
| SSE: 600188 | Yanzhou Coal Mining | Energy | Shanghai | 0.2 |
| SZSE: 300896 | IMEIK TECHNOLOGY DEVELOPMENT | Health Care | Shenzhen | 0.198 |
| SSE: 688256 | Cambricon Technologies | Information Technology | Shanghai | 0.197 |
| SSE: 600010 | Inner Mongolia Baotou Steel Union | Materials | Shanghai | 0.196 |
| SZSE: 002271 | Beijing Oriental Yuhong Waterproof Technology | Materials | Shenzhen | 0.195 |
| SSE: 601111 | Air China | Industrials | Shanghai | 0.195 |
| SZSE: 001979 | China Merchants Shekou Industrial Zone Holdings | Real Estate | Shenzhen | 0.192 |
| SZSE: 300408 | Chaozhou Three-Circle | Information Technology | Shenzhen | 0.191 |
| SSE: 600845 | Baosight Software | Information Technology | Shanghai | 0.189 |
| SSE: 603369 | Jiangsu King's Luck Brewery Joint-Stock | Consumer Staples | Shanghai | 0.189 |
| SSE: 600989 | Ningxia Baofeng Energy Group | Materials | Shanghai | 0.188 |
| SSE: 600745 | Wingtech | Information Technology | Shanghai | 0.186 |
| SSE: 601788 | Everbright Securities | Financials | Shanghai | 0.185 |
| SSE: 600115 | China Eastern Airlines Corp | Industrials | Shanghai | 0.183 |
| SSE: 600029 | China Southern Airlines | Industrials | Shanghai | 0.179 |
| SZSE: 002601 | LB Group | Materials | Shenzhen | 0.176 |
| SSE: 601360 | 360 Security Technology | Information Technology | Shanghai | 0.176 |
| SSE: 601901 | Founder Securities | Financials | Shanghai | 0.176 |
| SZSE: 002493 | Rongsheng Petro Chemical | Materials | Shenzhen | 0.175 |
| SSE: 600196 | Fosun Pharmaceutical | Health Care | Shanghai | 0.175 |
| SZSE: 002459 | JA Solar Technology | Information Technology | Shenzhen | 0.174 |
| SSE: 601699 | Shanxi Lu'an Environmental Energy Development | Energy | Shanghai | 0.173 |
| SSE: 601995 | China International Capital Corporation | Financials | Shanghai | 0.172 |
| SSE: 600085 | Beijing Tongrentang | Health Care | Shanghai | 0.171 |
| SSE: 601100 | Jiangsu Hengli Hydraulic | Industrials | Shanghai | 0.171 |
| SSE: 601800 | China Communications Construction Company | Industrials | Shanghai | 0.171 |
| SZSE: 000895 | Henan Shuanghui Investment & Development | Consumer Staples | Shenzhen | 0.17 |
| SZSE: 002555 | 37 Interactive Entertainment Network Technology Group | Communication | Shenzhen | 0.17 |
| SZSE: 003816 | CGN Power | Utilities | Shenzhen | 0.17 |
| SSE: 600489 | Zhongjin Gold | Materials | Shanghai | 0.17 |
| SSE: 601066 | China Securities | Financials | Shanghai | 0.17 |
| SZSE: 000963 | Huadong Medicine | Health Care | Shenzhen | 0.166 |
| SZSE: 300142 | Walvax Biotechnology | Health Care | Shenzhen | 0.166 |
| SZSE: 300033 | Hithink RoyalFlush Information Network | Financials | Shenzhen | 0.165 |
| SZSE: 000768 | AVIC Aircraft | Industrials | Shenzhen | 0.163 |
| SSE: 601633 | Great Wall Motor | Consumer Discretionary | Shanghai | 0.162 |
| SZSE: 000786 | Beijing New Building Materials Public | Industrials | Shenzhen | 0.16 |
| SZSE: 002920 | Huizhou Desay SV Automotive | Consumer Discretionary | Shenzhen | 0.16 |
| SSE: 600600 | Tsingtao Brewery | Consumer Staples | Shanghai | 0.16 |
| SSE: 601868 | China Energy Engineering Corporation | Industrials | Shanghai | 0.159 |
| SZSE: 002648 | SATELLITE CHEMICAL | Materials | Shenzhen | 0.157 |
| SSE: 601021 | Spring Airlines | Industrials | Shanghai | 0.157 |
| SSE: 603392 | BEIJING WANTAI BIOLOGICAL PHARMACY ENTERPRISE | Health Care | Shanghai | 0.157 |
| SZSE: 000301 | Jiangsu Eastern Shenghong | Materials | Shenzhen | 0.156 |
| SZSE: 002001 | Zhejiang NHU | Health Care | Shenzhen | 0.156 |
| SSE: 600741 | HUAYU Automotive Systems Company | Consumer Discretionary | Shanghai | 0.154 |
| SSE: 601336 | New China Life Insurance | Financials | Shanghai | 0.153 |
| SSE: 601689 | Ningbo Tuopu Group | Consumer Discretionary | Shanghai | 0.153 |
| SSE: 688599 | Trina Solar | Information Technology | Shanghai | 0.153 |
| SZSE: 002812 | Yunnan Energy New Material | Materials | Shenzhen | 0.151 |
| SSE: 600346 | Hengli Petrochemical | Materials | Shanghai | 0.151 |
| SZSE: 000983 | Shanxi Coking Coal Energy Group | Energy | Shenzhen | 0.148 |
| SSE: 601881 | China Galaxy Securities | Financials | Shanghai | 0.148 |
| SSE: 600588 | Yonyou Network Technology | Information Technology | Shanghai | 0.146 |
| SSE: 600515 | Hainan Airport Infrastructure | Real Estate | Shanghai | 0.144 |
| SSE: 601117 | China National Chemical Engineering | Industrials | Shanghai | 0.144 |
| SSE: 601838 | BANK OF CHENGDU | Financials | Shanghai | 0.142 |
| SSE: 688126 | National Silicon Industry Group | Information Technology | Shanghai | 0.142 |
| SZSE: 300450 | WUXI LEAD INTELLIGENT EQUIPMENT | Industrials | Shenzhen | 0.14 |
| SZSE: 002736 | Guosen Securities | Financials | Shenzhen | 0.139 |
| SZSE: 002821 | Asymchem Laboratories (Tianjin) | Health Care | Shenzhen | 0.136 |
| SZSE: 300316 | Zhejiang Jingsheng Mechanical & Electrical | Information Technology | Shenzhen | 0.136 |
| SZSE: 300433 | Lens Technology | Information Technology | Shenzhen | 0.135 |
| SSE: 600176 | CHINA JUSHI | Materials | Shanghai | 0.135 |
| SZSE: 002709 | Guangzhou Tinci Materials Technology | Materials | Shenzhen | 0.134 |
| SZSE: 300347 | Hangzhou Tigermed Consulting | Health Care | Shenzhen | 0.133 |
| SSE: 601618 | Metallurgical Corporation of China | Industrials | Shanghai | 0.133 |
| SSE: 601872 | China Merchants Energy Shipping | Energy | Shanghai | 0.132 |
| SZSE: 000408 | ZANGGE MINING COMPANY | Materials | Shenzhen | 0.13 |
| SZSE: 002180 | Ninestar Corporation | Information Technology | Shenzhen | 0.13 |
| SZSE: 300661 | SG Micro | Information Technology | Shenzhen | 0.13 |
| SSE: 600372 | China Avionics Systems | Industrials | Shanghai | 0.129 |
| SSE: 601898 | China Coal Energy | Energy | Shanghai | 0.128 |
| SSE: 688396 | China Resources Microelectronics | Information Technology | Shanghai | 0.127 |
| SZSE: 300496 | Thunder Software Technology | Information Technology | Shenzhen | 0.125 |
| SZSE: 000733 | China Zhenhua (Group) Science & Technology | Information Technology | Shenzhen | 0.124 |
| SSE: 601877 | Zhejiang Chint Electrics | Industrials | Shanghai | 0.124 |
| SSE: 600233 | YTO Express Group | Industrials | Shanghai | 0.123 |
| SZSE: 000999 | China Resources Sanjiu Medical & Pharmaceutical | Health Care | Shenzhen | 0.122 |
| SSE: 600219 | Shandong Nanshan Aluminium | Materials | Shanghai | 0.122 |
| SZSE: 002007 | Hualan Biological Engineering | Health Care | Shenzhen | 0.121 |
| SSE: 600023 | Zhejiang Zheneng Electric Power | Utilities | Shanghai | 0.121 |
| SZSE: 002074 | GUOXUAN HIGH-TECH | Industrials | Shenzhen | 0.118 |
| SZSE: 002202 | Xinjiang Goldwind Science & Technology | Industrials | Shenzhen | 0.118 |
| SZSE: 300759 | Pharmaron Beijing | Health Care | Shenzhen | 0.117 |
| SSE: 600332 | Guangzhou Baiyunshan Pharmaceutical Holdings | Health Care | Shanghai | 0.117 |
| SSE: 603806 | HANGZHOU FIRST PV MATERIAL | Information Technology | Shanghai | 0.116 |
| SSE: 600362 | Jiangxi Copper | Materials | Shanghai | 0.114 |
| SZSE: 000876 | New Hope Liuhe | Consumer Staples | Shenzhen | 0.113 |
| SSE: 600183 | Shengyi Technology | Information Technology | Shanghai | 0.113 |
| SSE: 601607 | Shanghai Pharmaceuticals Holding | Health Care | Shanghai | 0.113 |
| SSE: 601799 | Changzhou Xingyu Automotive Lighting Systems | Consumer Discretionary | Shanghai | 0.113 |
| SZSE: 301269 | Empyrean Technology | Information Technology | Shenzhen | 0.111 |
| SSE: 601238 | Guangzhou Automobile Group | Consumer Discretionary | Shanghai | 0.111 |
| SSE: 601878 | ZHESHANG SECURITIES | Financials | Shanghai | 0.111 |
| SSE: 601998 | China Citic Bank | Financials | Shanghai | 0.111 |
| SSE: 600918 | Zhongtai Securities | Financials | Shanghai | 0.109 |
| SZSE: 300999 | Yihai Kerry | Consumer Staples | Shenzhen | 0.108 |
| SZSE: 300223 | Ingenic Semiconductor | Information Technology | Shenzhen | 0.106 |
| SSE: 603260 | Hoshine Silicon Industry | Materials | Shanghai | 0.105 |
| SSE: 688303 | XinJiang Daqo New Energy | Information Technology | Shanghai | 0.105 |
| SZSE: 300413 | Mango Excellent Media | Communication | Shenzhen | 0.104 |
| SSE: 601615 | MingYangSmartEnergyGroup | Industrials | Shanghai | 0.104 |
| SZSE: 002410 | Glodon Software | Information Technology | Shenzhen | 0.102 |
| SSE: 600875 | Dongfang Electric Corporation | Industrials | Shanghai | 0.102 |
| SZSE: 002603 | Shijiazhuang Yiling Pharmaceutical | Health Care | Shenzhen | 0.101 |
| SSE: 600061 | SDIC Essence | Financials | Shanghai | 0.099 |
| SSE: 688223 | Jinko Solar | Information Technology | Shanghai | 0.099 |
| SSE: 600460 | Hangzhou Silan Microelectronics | Information Technology | Shanghai | 0.098 |
| SSE: 600803 | ENN Ecological Holdings | Utilities | Shanghai | 0.098 |
| SZSE: 300751 | Suzhou Maxwell Technologies | Information Technology | Shenzhen | 0.095 |
| SSE: 600025 | HuanengLancang River Hydropower | Utilities | Shanghai | 0.094 |
| SSE: 601319 | People's Insurance Company of China | Financials | Shanghai | 0.094 |
| SZSE: 002841 | Guangzhou Shiyuan Electronic Technology Company | Information Technology | Shenzhen | 0.093 |
| SSE: 600732 | Shanghai Aiko Solar Energy | Information Technology | Shanghai | 0.093 |
| SSE: 603659 | Shanghai Putailai New Energy Technology | Materials | Shanghai | 0.09 |
| SZSE: 300454 | Sangfor Technologies | Information Technology | Shenzhen | 0.089 |
| SZSE: 300919 | CNGR Advanced Material | Materials | Shenzhen | 0.089 |
| SSE: 600132 | Chongqing Brewery | Consumer Staples | Shanghai | 0.089 |
| SZSE: 000617 | CNPC Capital Company | Financials | Shenzhen | 0.088 |
| SZSE: 300763 | Ginlong Technologies | Industrials | Shenzhen | 0.088 |
| SZSE: 000069 | Shenzhen Overseas Chinese Town Company | Real Estate | Shenzhen | 0.085 |
| SSE: 600018 | Shanghai International Port Group | Industrials | Shanghai | 0.085 |
| SZSE: 000708 | CITIC Pacific Special Steel Group | Materials | Shenzhen | 0.083 |
| SZSE: 300628 | Yealink Network Technology | Information Technology | Shenzhen | 0.083 |
| SZSE: 002938 | Avary Holding (Shenzhen) Co | Information Technology | Shenzhen | 0.082 |
| SZSE: 002916 | Shennan Circuits | Information Technology | Shenzhen | 0.081 |
| SSE: 605117 | Ningbo Deye Technology | Industrials | Shanghai | 0.081 |
| SSE: 600039 | Sichuan Road&Bridge | Industrials | Shanghai | 0.08 |
| SSE: 605499 | Eastroc Beverage (Group) | Consumer Staples | Shanghai | 0.08 |
| SSE: 603195 | GONGNIU GROUP | Industrials | Shanghai | 0.077 |
| SSE: 600754 | Shanghai Jin Jiang International Hotels | Consumer Discretionary | Shanghai | 0.075 |
| SSE: 603899 | SHANGHAI M&G STATIONERY | Industrials | Shanghai | 0.074 |
| SSE: 603290 | StarPower Semiconductor | Information Technology | Shanghai | 0.073 |
| SSE: 603833 | Oppein Home Group | Consumer Discretionary | Shanghai | 0.071 |
| SSE: 601865 | Flat Glass Group | Information Technology | Shanghai | 0.07 |
| SSE: 688363 | Bloomage Biotechnology Corporation | Health Care | Shanghai | 0.069 |
| SZSE: 000877 | Xinjiang Tianshan Cement | Materials | Shenzhen | 0.067 |
| SSE: 688065 | Cathay Biotech | Materials | Shanghai | 0.063 |
| SZSE: 300957 | Yunnan Botanee Bio-Technology Group | Consumer Staples | Shenzhen | 0.062 |
| SSE: 601236 | HONGTA SECURITIES | Financials | Shanghai | 0.062 |
| SSE: 601698 | China Satellite Communications | Communication | Shanghai | 0.06 |
| SSE: 688187 | Zhuzhou CRRC Times Electric | Industrials | Shanghai | 0.057 |
| SSE: 688561 | Qi An Xin Technology Group | Information Technology | Shanghai | 0.054 |
| SSE: 601155 | Future Land Holdings | Real Estate | Shanghai | 0.053 |
| SSE: 600606 | China Development Holdings | Real Estate | Shanghai | 0.052 |
| SZSE: 300979 | Huali Industrial Group Company | Consumer Discretionary | Shenzhen | 0.049 |
| SSE: 601808 | China Oilfield Services | Energy | Shanghai | 0.048 |
| SSE: 603486 | Ecovacs Robotics | Consumer Discretionary | Shanghai | 0.048 |
| SZSE: 000800 | FAW Car | Industrials | Shenzhen | 0.046 |
| SSE: 601059 | CINDA SECURITIES | Financials | Shanghai | 0.031 |
| SZSE: 001289 | China Longyuan Power Group Limited | Utilities | Shenzhen | 0.016 |

1. Technology (16.0%)
2. Telecommunications (2.00%)
3. Health Care (7.00%)
4. Financials (23.0%)
5. Real Estate (1.00%)
6. Consumer Discretionary (7.00%)
7. Consumer Staples (13.0%)
8. Industrials (15.0%)
9. Basic Materials (8.00%)
10. Energy (4.00%)
11. Utilities (4.00%)

== Sub-Indices ==
Moreover, there are the following ten sub-indices, which reflect specific sectors:

- CSI 300 Energy Index
- CSI 300 Materials Index
- CSI 300 Industrials Index
- CSI 300 Consumer Discretionary Index
- CSI 300 Consumer Staples Index
- CSI 300 Health Care Index
- CSI 300 Financial Index
- CSI 300 Information Technology Index
- CSI 300 Telecommunications Index
- CSI 300 Utilities Index

CSI 300 Index also split into CSI 100 Index and CSI 200 Index for top 100 companies and 101st to 300th companies

== Historical changes ==
| Date | In | Out |
|---|---|---|
| 11 June 2007 | Oceanwide Real Estate Group and 27 companies | |
| November 2007 | | |
| June 2008 | | |
| November 2008 | | |
| June 2009 | | |
| November 2009 | | |
| June 2010 | | |
| 16 July 2010 | Agricultural Bank of China | Guangzhou Shipyard International |
| November 2010 | | |
| June 2011 | | |
| November 2011 | | |
| 11 June 2012 | Oceanwide Real Estate Group and 17 companies | |
| November 2012 | | |
| June 2013 | | |
| November 2013 | | |
| June 2014 | | |
| November 2014 | | |
| 1 June 2015 | Oceanwide Holdings and 17 companies | |
| November 2015 | | |
| 30 May 2016 | | |
| 28 November 2016 | | Oceanwide Holdings and 29 companies |
| 31 May 2017 | | |
| 27 November 2017 | | |
| 28 May 2018 | | |
