= CSI A100 Index =

Chinese weighted stock market index

CSI 100 Index
- Foundation: 29 May 2006; 19 years ago (launch date); 30 December 2005 (base date)
- Operator: China Securities Index Company
- Exchanges: Shanghai Stock Exchange; Shenzhen Stock Exchange
- Constituents: 100
- Type: large cap A share
- Market cap: CN¥20.273 trillion (September 2017); CN¥7.118 trillion (free-float adjusted, September 2017)
- Related indices: CSI 200 Index; CSI 300
- Website: www.csindex.com.cn/en/indices/index-detail/000903#/indices/family/detail?indexCode=000903

CSI A100 Index
- Simplified Chinese: 中证100指数
- Traditional Chinese: 中證100指數
- Hanyu Pinyin: Zhōngzhèng Yībǎi zhǐshù
Transcriptions
Standard Mandarin
- Hanyu Pinyin: Zhōngzhèng Yībǎi zhǐshù

The CSI 100 Index (Chinese: 中证100指数) is a capitalization-weighted, free float adjusted stock market index designed to replicate the performance of top 100 stocks traded in the Shanghai and Shenzhen stock exchanges. It is a sub-index of CSI 300 Index.

The index is compiled by the China Securities Index.

Its value is normalized relative to a base of 1000 on 30 December 2005.

CSI 100 Index was considered as an index for big caps.

== Constituents ==
As of 8 March 2024

Ticker	Company	Segment	Exchange	Weighting (%)
SSE: 600519	Kweichow Moutai	Consumer Staples	Shanghai	9.501
SSE: 601318	Ping An Insurance	Financials	Shanghai	4.577
SZSE: 300750	CATL	Industrials	Shenzhen	4.278
SSE: 600036	China Merchants Bank	Financials	Shanghai	3.931
SZSE: 000333	Midea Group	Consumer Discretionary	Shenzhen	3.052
SSE: 600900	China Yangtze Power	Utilities	Shanghai	2.43
SSE: 601899	Zijin Mining Group	Materials	Shanghai	2.141
SZSE: 002714	Muyuan Foodstuff	Consumer Staples	Shenzhen	2.09
SSE: 600030	CITIC Securities	Financials	Shanghai	2.061
SSE: 600276	Jiangsu Hengrui Medicine	Health Care	Shanghai	1.887
SSE: 601398	Industrial and Commercial Bank of China	Financials	Shanghai	1.852
SZSE: 000651	Gree Electric Appliances	Consumer Discretionary	Shenzhen	1.744
SZSE: 300760	Mindray	Health Care	Shenzhen	1.738
SZSE: 002594	BYD	Consumer Discretionary	Shenzhen	1.718
SSE: 600309	Wanhua Chemical Group	Materials	Shanghai	1.485
SZSE: 000725	BOE Technology Group	Information Technology	Shenzhen	1.482
SZSE: 002475	Luxshare Precision Industry	Information Technology	Shenzhen	1.368
SZSE: 300124	Shenzhen Inovance Technology	Industrials	Shenzhen	1.337
SZSE: 002415	Hangzhou Hikvision Digital Technology	Information Technology	Shenzhen	1.293
SSE: 601012	Longi Green Energy Technology	Information Technology	Shanghai	1.276
SSE: 601088	China Shenhua Energy	Energy	Shanghai	1.262
SSE: 601816	Beijing-Shanghai High Speed Railway	Industrials	Shanghai	1.229
SSE: 600028	China Petroleum & Chemical Corporation	Energy	Shanghai	1.179
SSE: 601668	China State Construction Engineering	Industrials	Shanghai	1.112
SSE: 603259	WuXi AppTec	Health Care	Shanghai	1.109
SSE: 601857	PetroChina	Energy	Shanghai	0.993
SSE: 601225	Shaanxi Coal Industry Company	Energy	Shanghai	0.992
SZSE: 300308	Zhongji Innolight	Information Technology	Shenzhen	0.988
SSE: 688981	Semiconductor Manufacturing International Corporation	Information Technology	Shanghai	0.946
SZSE: 000063	ZTE	Information Technology	Shenzhen	0.943
SZSE: 002352	S.F. Holding	Industrials	Shenzhen	0.93
SSE: 600406	NARI Technology	Industrials	Shanghai	0.923
SSE: 600941	China Mobile	Communication	Shanghai	0.913
SZSE: 000338	Weichai Power	Industrials	Shenzhen	0.908
SSE: 600050	China United Network Communications	Communication	Shanghai	0.908
SZSE: 002230	Iflytek	Information Technology	Shenzhen	0.907
SSE: 600690	Qingdao Haier	Consumer Discretionary	Shanghai	0.904
SSE: 601728	China Telecom Corporation	Communication	Shanghai	0.9
SZSE: 300274	Sungrow Power Supply	Industrials	Shenzhen	0.899
SZSE: 000792	Qinghai Salt Lake Industry	Materials	Shenzhen	0.87
SZSE: 000100	TCL Corporation	Information Technology	Shenzhen	0.843
SSE: 601888	China International Travel Service	Consumer Discretionary	Shanghai	0.843
SSE: 600031	Sany Heavy Industry	Industrials	Shanghai	0.821
SSE: 601985	China National Nuclear Power	Utilities	Shanghai	0.812
SSE: 601766	CRRC Corporation	Industrials	Shanghai	0.769
SZSE: 002371	NAURA Technology Group	Information Technology	Shenzhen	0.746
SSE: 600089	TBEA	Industrials	Shanghai	0.746
SSE: 600438	Tongwei Company	Information Technology	Shanghai	0.71
SSE: 600048	Poly Real Estate Group	Real Estate	Shanghai	0.696
SSE: 603501	Will Semiconductor	Information Technology	Shanghai	0.694
SZSE: 000002	China Vanke	Real Estate	Shenzhen	0.677
SZSE: 300015	Aier Eye Hospital	Health Care	Shenzhen	0.677
SSE: 600436	Zhangzhou Pientzehuang Pharmaceutical	Health Care	Shanghai	0.667
SSE: 601919	China Cosco Holdings	Industrials	Shanghai	0.664
SSE: 600905	China Three Gorges Renewables (Group)	Utilities	Shanghai	0.655
SSE: 601390	China Railway Group Limited	Industrials	Shanghai	0.647
SZSE: 300122	Chongqing Zhifei Biological Products	Health Care	Shenzhen	0.636
SZSE: 002027	Focus Media Information Technology	Communication	Shenzhen	0.631
SSE: 688012	Advanced Micro-Fabrication Equipment	Information Technology	Shanghai	0.631
SSE: 688111	Beijing Kingsoft Office Software	Information Technology	Shanghai	0.62
SSE: 600019	Baoshan Iron and Steel	Materials	Shanghai	0.585
SSE: 600585	Anhui Conch Cement	Materials	Shanghai	0.569
SZSE: 002466	Tianqi Lithium	Materials	Shenzhen	0.55
SZSE: 000938	Unisplendour	Information Technology	Shenzhen	0.501
SSE: 603986	GigaDevice	Information Technology	Shanghai	0.484
SZSE: 002049	Unigroup Guoxin Microelectronics	Information Technology	Shenzhen	0.482
SSE: 601600	Aluminum Corporation of China Limited	Materials	Shanghai	0.476
SSE: 600111	China Northern Rare Earth Group	Materials	Shanghai	0.473
SSE: 688008	Montage Technology	Information Technology	Shanghai	0.471
SZSE: 300014	Eve Energy	Industrials	Shenzhen	0.466
SSE: 600893	AVIC Aviation Engine Corporation	Industrials	Shanghai	0.455
SZSE: 002460	Ganfeng Lithium	Materials	Shenzhen	0.448
SZSE: 002129	Tianjin Zhonghuan Semiconductor	Information Technology	Shenzhen	0.433
SSE: 603993	China Molybdenum	Materials	Shanghai	0.431
SZSE: 000661	Chang Chun High and New Technology Industry (Group)	Health Care	Shenzhen	0.412
SSE: 600426	Shandong Hualu-Hengsheng Chemical	Materials	Shanghai	0.405
SZSE: 002241	GoerTek	Information Technology	Shenzhen	0.395
SSE: 600547	Shandong Gold-Mining	Materials	Shanghai	0.389
SSE: 603799	Zhejiang Huayou Cobalt	Materials	Shanghai	0.376
SSE: 600570	Hundsun Technologies	Information Technology	Shanghai	0.368
SSE: 600010	Inner Mongolia Baotou Steel Union	Materials	Shanghai	0.347
SZSE: 002271	Beijing Oriental Yuhong Waterproof Technology	Materials	Shenzhen	0.345
SZSE: 001979	China Merchants Shekou Industrial Zone Holdings	Real Estate	Shenzhen	0.338
SSE: 600989	Ningxia Baofeng Energy Group	Materials	Shanghai	0.333
SSE: 600745	Wingtech	Information Technology	Shanghai	0.329
SZSE: 002601	LB Group	Materials	Shenzhen	0.311
SZSE: 002493	Rongsheng Petro Chemical	Materials	Shenzhen	0.309
SZSE: 002555	37 Interactive Entertainment Network Technology Group	Communication	Shenzhen	0.3
SZSE: 300142	Walvax Biotechnology	Health Care	Shenzhen	0.293
SZSE: 002648	Satellite Chemical	Materials	Shenzhen	0.277
SZSE: 000301	Jiangsu Eastern Shenghong	Materials	Shenzhen	0.275
SSE: 688599	Trina Solar	Information Technology	Shanghai	0.27
SZSE: 002812	Yunnan Energy New Material	Materials	Shenzhen	0.267
SSE: 600346	Hengli Petrochemical	Materials	Shanghai	0.266
SSE: 600588	Yonyou Network Technology	Information Technology	Shanghai	0.258
SSE: 600176	CHINA JUSHI	Materials	Shanghai	0.239
SZSE: 002709	Tinci Materials	Materials	Shenzhen	0.236
SZSE: 300347	Hangzhou Tigermed Consulting	Health Care	Shenzhen	0.234
SZSE: 300413	Mango Excellent Media	Communication	Shenzhen	0.184
SZSE: 002410	Glodon Software	Information Technology	Shenzhen	0.181

== See also ==
- SSE 50 Index, an index for top 50 companies in Shanghai Stock Exchange
- SZSE 100 Index, an index for top 100 companies in Shenzhen Stock Exchange
