= FTSE China A50 Index =

Chinese stock market index

- Operator: FTSE Group
- Constituents: 50
- Website: www.ftserussell.com/products/indices/china-a50

FTSE China A50 Index (was known as FTSE–Xinhua China A50 Index) is a stock market index by FTSE Group (FTSE–Xinhua joint venture until 2010), the components were chosen from Shanghai Stock Exchange and Shenzhen Stock Exchange, which issue A-share; B-share (share for foreigners) were not included.

Other similar product were CSI 300 Index (and the sub-index CSI 100) by China Securities Index Company and "Dow Jones China 88 Index" by S&P Dow Jones Indices. For top 50 companies in the Shanghai Stock Exchange, see SSE 50 Index, For top 100 companies in the Shenzhen Stock Exchange, see SZSE 100 Index.

== Constituents ==
As of 23 May 2024

Name	Weighting (5)
Agricultural Bank of China	2.79
Bank of China	1.36
Bank of Communications	1.86
Beijing–Shanghai High-Speed Railway	0.98
BYD	2.61
CGN Power	0.20
China CITIC Bank	0.46
China Construction Bank	0.46
China Everbright Bank	1.01
China Merchants Bank	4.90
China Pacific Insurance	1.36
China Petroleum & Chemical	1.45
China Securities	0.74
China Shenhua Energy	1.99
China State Construction Engineering	1.63
China Tourism Group	0.99
China Yangtze Power	4.28
CITIC Securities	1.54
Contemporary Amperex Technology	6.01
East Money Information	1.35
Foshan Haitian Flavouring and Food	1.22
Foxconn Industrial Internet	2.14
Great Wall Motor	0.50
Gree Electric Appliances Inc of Zhuhai	1.11
Haier	1.27
Hygon Information Technology	0.34
Industrial and Commercial Bank of China	2.83
Industrial Bank	2.52
Inner Mongolia Yili Industrial	1.25
Jiangsu Hengrui Medicine	1.84
Kweichow Moutai	14.23
LONGi Green Energy Technology	0.96
Luxshare Precision Industry	1.55
Luzhou Laojiao	1.81
Mindray	2.52
Muyuan Foodstuff	1.75
NARI Technology	1.20
People's Insurance Company of China	0.39
PetroChina	1.65
Ping An Bank	1.48
Ping An Insurance	3.25
Postal Savings Bank of China	0.78
S.F. Holding	1.26
Shaanxi Coal and Chemical Industry	1.66
Shanghai Pudong Development Bank	1.67
Shanxi Xinghuacun Fen Wine Factory	2.10
Wanhua Chemical Group	1.87
Wuliangye Yibin	3.99
Yihai Kerry	0.41
Zijin Mining	2.46

== Other indices ==
- FTSE China B Share All Cap Index all B shares in Shenzhen and Shanghai Stock Exchange (currently 57 companies)
- Hang Seng China Enterprises Index top 50 H shares in Hong Kong Stock Exchange
- Hang Seng China-Affiliated Corporations Index top 25 Red Chips in Hong Kong Stock Exchange
- FTSE China 50 Index, top 50 H shares, P Chip and Red Chip in Hong Kong Stock Exchange
- FTSE China A-H 50 Index top 50 A+H shares in Hong Kong, Shanghai and Shenzhen Stock Exchange
- Hang Seng China 50 Index top 50 A+H+Red Chip+other in Hong Kong, Shanghai and Shenzhen Stock Exchange
- For products by MSCI, see this link.

== FTSE China A50 Index tracker funds ==
=== Exchange-traded funds ===
- CSOP A50 ETF (SEHK: 2822) in HK$
- CSOP A50 ETF-R (SEHK: 82822) in CN¥
- iShares FTSE A50 China Index ETF (SEHK: 2823) synthetic ETF
- Bosera FTSE China A50 Index ETF (SEHK: 2832) in HK$
- Bosera FTSE China A50 Index ETF-R (SEHK: 82832) in CN¥
- PRINCIPAL FTSE CHINA 50 ETF (KLSE: 0823EA) in MYR
