= New China Life Insurance =

Chinese state-owned insurance company

New China Life Insurance Co., Ltd.
- Company type: State-owned enterprise; Public
- Traded as: SSE: 601336 (A share); SEHK: 1336 (H share); CSI Midcap 200
- Industry: Financial services
- Founded: September 1996
- Headquarters: NCI Tower, Beijing, China
- Services: Life insurance
- Revenue: ▲CN¥157.918 billion (2015)
- Net income: ▲CN¥8.601 billion (2015)
- Total assets: ▲CN¥660.560 billion (2015)
- Total equity: ▲CN¥57.835 billion (2015)
- Owner: Central Huijin (32.25%); Baosteel Group (15.11%); Swiss Re (4.90%); Fosun International (3.28%); others (44.46%)
- Website: newchinalife.com
- Footnotes / references in a consolidated basis

New China Life Insurance Co., Ltd.
- Simplified Chinese: 新华人寿保险股份有限公司
- Traditional Chinese: 新華人壽保險股份有限公司
Transcriptions
Standard Mandarin
- Hanyu Pinyin: Xīnhuá rénshòu bǎoxiǎn gǔfèn yǒuxiàn gōngsī

New China Insurance Group
- Simplified Chinese: 新华保险集团
- Traditional Chinese: 新華保險集團
Transcriptions

New China Life Insurance Co., Ltd. also known as New China Insurance (NCI) or Xinhua Baoxian Jituan (Chinese: 新华保险集团) is a Chinese life insurance company based in Beijing. The Chinese government owns more than half of the shares of the company via sovereign fund Central Huijin, via state-owned enterprise Baosteel Group and a financial service company China Securities Finance.

The company is a constituent of the CSI 300 Index, FTSE China A50 Index and Hang Seng China Enterprises Index, and is a former constituent of the SSE 50 Index (blue chip of Shanghai Stock Exchange).

The company was ranked 427th in 2016 Fortune Global 500 and 297th in 2016 Forbes Global 2000.

== Equity investments ==
The company invested the premium received to several publicly traded company of China, notably Hikvision (0.51% stake in 2015), Industrial Bank (0.21% stake in 2015) and Tianqi Lithium (5.20% stake in 2015).

== Shareholders ==
Top 10 shareholders
As of 31 December 2015

- State Council of the People's Republic of China (47.36%, as A shares)
  - Central Huijin Investment (32.25%, as A shares)
  - China Baowu Steel Group (15.11%, as A shares)
- Swiss Re (4.90%, as H shares)
- Fosun International (3.28%, as H shares)
- China Securities Finance (2.70%, as A shares)
- BlackRock (1.92%, as H shares)
- Beijing Taiji Huaqing Information System (0.71%, as A shares)
- Tibet Shannan Xinshang Investment Management (0.36%, as A shares)
- HFT Investment Management – Agricultural Bank of China – Huaneng Guicheng Trust: No.3 Assembled Funds Trust Plan of HFT Securities Investment (0.24%, as A shares)
- Industrial and Commercial Bank of China: Harvest New Opportunity Flexible Allocation Mixed Launched Securities Investment Fund (0.23%, as A shares)
- Note: As all the H shares were held by a proxy: HKSCC Nominees Limited, as well the threshold to disclose the share holding was 5% (of total H shares capital), the list may incomplete.
