= Kingwills =

Chinese materials science company

- Native name: 青昀
- Type: Private
- Industry: Manufacturing
- Founded: 2014; 12 years ago
- Founder: Eric Chen
- Headquarters: Nantong, Jiangsu
- Products: Special fiber material
- Website: www.kingwills.com

Qingyun New Materials
- Chinese: 青昀新材
- Hanyu Pinyin: Qīngyún Xīncái

Kingwills, also referred to as Jiangsu Qingyun New Materials, is a Chinese materials science company founded in 2014. The company is seen as a competitor to DuPont. It mainly produces the "Hypak" (Kunlun in Chinese) flash-spun metamaterial. The company's founder is Chen Boyi (陈博屹), better known as Eric Chen, who also serves as its chairman.

With headquarters located in Nantong, Kingwills has established operations in overseas markets, such as the United States, and India. After its establishment, the company was funded by Hillhouse Ventures, Oriental Yuhong, and CITIC Environment Fund. It set up a firm called Kingwills International in Hong Kong.

== History ==
Kingwills was formed in 2014. In 2019, the company launched the Hypak material. In August 2022, its 3,000-ton flash-spun metamaterial production line went into operation.

In 2022, Kingwills was financed by CICC Capital. In the same year, its products became available in India. In May 2023, it completed a Series B financing of more than 100 million yuan.

== Dispute with DuPont ==
In October 2024, Kingwills was subject to a complaint filed by DuPont with the USITC. The legal action seeks to prevent the importation of products that infringe DuPont IP related to its Tyvek brand and products.

In the legal action, Kingwills was alleged to be in violation of Section 337. On November 21, 2024, the company was investigated by the USITC. By November 25, the USITC had not made any decision on the merits of the case.
