= SSE 50 Index =

Shanghai Stock Exchange index

- Foundation: 2 January 2004; 22 years ago (launch date); 31 December 2003 (base date)
- Operator: Shanghai Stock Exchange; China Securities Index
- Exchanges: Shanghai Stock Exchange
- Constituents: 50
- Type: large cap A share
- Market cap: CN¥14.010 trillion (September 2017); CN¥4.567 trillion (free-float adjusted, September 2017)
- Related indices: SSE Mega-Cap; SSE MidCap; SSE 180; SSE 380; SSE Composite
- Website: www.csindex.com.cn/en/indices/index-detail/000016

SSE 50 Index is the stock index of Shanghai Stock Exchange, representing the top 50 companies by "float-adjusted" capitalization and other criteria. In order to qualify as a constituent of SSE 50 Index, it must be a constituent of SSE 180 Index, thus SSE 50 is a subindex of SSE 180 Index. SSE 50 Index is also a subset of SSE Composite Index, which included all stock.

SSE 50 was regarded as a blue-chip index of the exchange.

== Constituents ==
As of 23 February 2024, the index constituents are:

Name	Ticker symbol
China Petroleum & Chemical Corporation	SSE: 600028
CITIC Securities	SSE: 600030
Sany Heavy Industries	SSE: 600031
China Merchants Bank	SSE: 600036
Poly Real Estate	SSE: 600048
China United Network Communications Limited	SSE: 600050
TBEA Co., Ltd.	SSE: 600089
SAIC Motor	SSE: 600104
China Northern Rare Earth	SSE: 600111
China CSSC Holdings Limited	SSE: 600150
Jiangsu Hengrui Pharmaceuticals	SSE: 600276
Wanhua Chemical Group	SSE: 600309
NARI Technology	SSE: 600406
Zhangzhou Pientzehuang Pharmaceutical	SSE: 600436
Tongwei Company	SSE: 600438
Kweichow Moutai	SSE: 600519
Haier Smart Home	SSE: 600690
Shanxi Xinghuacun Fen Wine Factory	SSE: 600809
Yili Group	SSE: 600887
AECC Aviation Power	SSE: 600893
China Yangtze Power	SSE: 600900
China Three Gorges Renewables	SSE: 600905
LONGi Green Energy Technology	SSE: 601012
China Shenhua Energy	SSE: 601088
Industrial Bank	SSE: 601166
Shaanxi Coal Industry	SSE: 601225
Agricultural Bank of China	SSE: 601288
Ping An Insurance	SSE: 601318
China Railway Group Limited	SSE: 601390
Industrial and Commercial Bank of China	SSE: 601398
China Pacific Insurance Company	SSE: 601601
China Life Insurance	SSE: 601628
Great Wall Motor Company	SSE: 601633
China State Construction Engineering	SSE: 601668
Power Construction Corporation of China	SSE: 601669
China Telecom	SSE: 601728
PetroChina	SSE: 601857
China Tourism Group Duty Free Corporation	SSE: 601888
Zijin Mining Group	SSE: 601899
Cosco Shipping	SSE: 601919
Bank of China	SSE: 601988
WuXi AppTec	SSE: 603259
Foshan Haitian Flavouring & Food Co	SSE: 603288
Will Semiconductor	SSE: 603501
Zhejiang Huayou Cobalt	SSE: 603799
GigaDevice	SSE: 603986
Beijing Kingsoft Office Software	SSE: 688111
Hygon Information Technology	SSE: 688041
Trina Solar	SSE: 688599
Semiconductor Manufacturing International Corporation	SSE: 688981
