= CSI Cross-Straits 500 Index =

The CSI Cross-Straits 500 is a stock market index operated by China Securities Index which includes 500 companies listed in the People's Republic of China, Hong Kong, and Taiwan. The new index covers 75 percent of the combined market capitalization of stock markets in the three regions and 53 percent of the combined trading volume. It will be launched on 18 January 2010 and will be published in four currency denominations: United States dollars, renminbi, Hong Kong dollars and New Taiwan dollars.

== See also ==
- Hang Seng Index
