= Gold in China =

Gold in China may refer to:

- Gold farming in China, overview video game currency acquisition in China, sold to other players for real money
- Gold mining in China, gold extraction in China
