= China Securities Index Company =

Chinese financial research firm and index provider

China Securities Index Company (CSI)
- Company type: Private Company
- Industry: Financial services
- Founded: August 2005
- Headquarters: Shanghai, China
- Key people: Yang Yongben (Chairman) Lu Suyuan (Director and General Manager)
- Products: indexes, custom indexes, bond valuation services, credit rating services, financial research
- Number of employees: 138 (2020)
- Website: https://www.csindex.com.cn

China Securities Index Company (Chinese: 中证指数有限公司) is a Chinese financial research firm and index provider. The company was founded in August 25, 2005 as a joint venture between the Shanghai Stock Exchange and the Shenzhen Stock Exchange. CSI is an index provider in China and manages over 4,000 indexes. The company also offers bond valuation and credit rating services. As of 2020, CSI has 138 employees.

While CSI indexes only cover Chinese securities, they are heavily used by investors worldwide. Multiple investment products including exchange-traded products use CSI indexes as their benchmarks, including the KraneShares CSI China Internet ETF and Direxion Daily China A Share ETFs.

== Notable Indexes ==
- The CSI 100 Index
- The CSI 200 Index
- The CSI 300 Index
- The CSI 500 Index
- The CSI Overseas China Internet Index

== Notable ETFs linked to CSI indexes ==
Company	Name	Ticker	Index	AUM (millions)
KraneShares	KraneShares CSI China Internet ETF	KWEB	The CSI Overseas China Internet Index	6970
DWS	Xtrackers Harvest CSI 500 China-A Shares Small Cap ETF	ASHS	The CSI 500 Index	35.17
DWS	Xtrackers Harvest CSI 300 China A-Shares ETF	ASHR	The CSI 300 Index	1860
Direxion	Direxion Daily CSI China Internet Index Bull 2X Shares	CWEB	The CSI Overseas China Internet Index	430.73
Direxion	Direxion Daily CSI 300 China A Share Bull 2X Shares	CHAU	The CSI 300 Index	65.95
Direxion	Direxion Daily CSI 300 China A Share Bear 1X Shares	CHAD	The CSI 300 Index	156.01
VanEck	VanEck Vectors ChinaAMC CSI 300 ETF	PEK	The CSI 300 Index	37.4
BlackRock	iShares Core CSI 300 ETF	9846(HKG)	The CSI 300 Index	60.83
