= United Imaging =

Chinese medical technology company

Shanghai United Imaging Healthcare Co., Ltd.
- Trade name: United Imaging
- Native name: 上海联影医疗科技股份有限公司
- Type: Public
- Traded as: SSE: 688271; CSI A100
- Industry: Medical technology
- Founded: 21 March 2011; 15 years ago
- Founders: Xue Min; Zhang Qiang
- Headquarters: Shanghai, China
- Key people: Zhang Qiang (Chairman & Co-CEO)
- Revenue: ▲CN¥11.41 billion (2023)
- Net income: ▲CN¥1.98 billion (2023)
- Total assets: ▲CN¥25.34 billion (2023)
- Total equity: ▲CN¥18.88 billion (2023)
- Owner: Privately held
- Number of employees: 7,440 (2023)
- Website: united-imaging.com

United Imaging (UIH; Chinese: 联影医疗; pinyin: Liányǐng Yīliáo) is a publicly listed multinational medical technology company headquartered in Shanghai, China. The company manufactures medical imaging and radiotherapy equipment and was founded with private funding.

== Background ==
United Imaging Healthcare (UIH) was founded in 2011 by Xue Min and Zhang Qiang who were former employees of Siemens. In 2013, UIH established its American Research and development center in Houston. In 2018, Houston became its regional headquarters when UIH entered the North American market by attending the Radiological Society of North America's annual meeting.

The company's North American headquarters in Houston officially opened in 2020. The CEO of the North American commercial business is Jeffrey M. Bundy, Ph.D. In 2022, United Imaging announced the installation of its 20,000th global system in NY, and in 2024 it announced the shipment of its 30,000th system globally from its Houston manufacturing facility for installation in the U.S. The company also opened an R&D office in Seattle in 2024.

United Imaging Healthcare is also present in countries such as Poland, United Kingdom, Italy, Germany, New Zealand, Australia, India, Japan, and South Korea. In 2024 the company announced it had received its first Health Canada approvals.

In 2014, General Secretary Xi Jinping visited the company during a trip to Shanghai. During the COVID-19 pandemic, Chinese health authorities listed scanners and X-ray systems as basic required equipment for hospitals. UIH became profitable in 2020

In August 2022, UIH held its initial public offering becoming a listed company on the Shanghai Stock Exchange STAR Market. It raised US$1.6 billion making its one of the largest offerings in China that year. On its trading debut, UIH shares surged 75%.

UIH has established overseas operations in 75+ countries, with the majority of revenue coming from China. It has a research partnership with Washington University School of Medicine among many other academic institutions in the U.S. and worldwide. In the United States, United Imaging has experienced significant growth, with a presence in more than 30 states and a number of new product launches in four different imaging modalities since 2018. UIH competes with peers such as Siemens Healthineers, GE HealthCare and Philips Healthcare.
