= Ping An Bank =

Chinese joint-stock commercial bank

- Headquarters in Shenzhen
- Type: Public
- Traded as: SZSE: 000001
- Industry: Financial services
- Founded: 22 June 1995 (Ping An Bank); 22 December 1987 (S.Z. Dev. Bank); 2012 (merger)
- Headquarters: Shenzhen, China
- Area served: Worldwide
- Services: Retail and corporate banking
- Revenue: ▲CN¥96.163 billion (2015)
- Operating income: ▲CN¥28.895 billion (2015)
- Net income: ▲CN¥21.865 billion (2015)
- Total assets: ▲CN¥3.42 trillion (2018)
- Total equity: ▲CN¥161.500 billion (2015)
- Owner: Ping An Insurance (55.67%); China Securities Finance (2.99%); other shareholders (41.34%)
- Parent: Ping An Insurance
- Capital ratio: ▲9.03% (CET1)
- Footnotes figures from 2015 Annual Report, please see the report for their definition of revenue, operating income in Chinese accounting standards; Ping An Life Insurance also held and additional 2.27% as the investment manager for their customers, thus excluding from the stake of Ping An Insurance.

Ping An Bank Co., Ltd.
- Simplified Chinese: 平安银行股份有限公司
- Traditional Chinese: 平安銀行股份有限公司
Transcriptions

Ping An Bank
- Simplified Chinese: 平安银行
- Traditional Chinese: 平安銀行
Transcriptions

Ping An Bank Co., Ltd. is a Chinese joint-stock commercial bank with its headquarters in Shenzhen. It primarily operates in mainland China with a representative branch in Hong Kong. The bank offers services in retail and corporate banking, including investment banking services. As a subsidiary of Ping An Insurance, the bank is one of the three main pillars of Ping An Group: insurance, banking and asset management.

The bank reverse takeover publicly traded company Shenzhen Development Bank and retained the stock code of the bank in 2012.

As one of twelve joint-stock commercial banks in China, Ping An Bank is a component of the FTSE China A50 Index, Hang Seng China 50 Index, and CSI 300 Index amongst others.

== Honors ==
- Ping An Bank was awarded the Business Model of the Year for 2019 at The Asian Banker International Excellence in Retail Financial Awards 2019.
- Ping An Bank is China's first bank to receive the "Asia's Best Digital Bank" award in 2020.
- Ping An Bank Wins Gartner Innovation Award for Financial Services in 2020.
