= Poly Developments and Holdings =

Chinese real estate company

Poly Developments and Holdings.
- Type: Public
- Traded as: SSE: 600048; CSI A100
- Industry: Real estate development
- Founded: 14 September 1992; 33 years ago
- Founder: China Poly Group
- Headquarters: Guangzhou, China
- Area served: mainland China
Key people
Song Guangju	(chairman)
Liu Ping	(managing director)
- Revenue: ▲CN¥154.773 billion (2016)
- Operating income: ▲CN¥23.123 billion (2016)
- Net income: CN¥12.422 billion (2016)
- Total assets: ▲CN¥467.997 billion (2016)
- Total equity: ▲CN¥89.253 billion (2016)
Owner
China Poly Group	(40.87%)
China Securities Finance	(2.58%)
Central Huijin	(1.52%)
general public	(55.03%)
Parent
Poly Southern Group	(direct)
China Poly Group	(intermediate)
The SASAC	(intermediate)
The State Council	(ultimate)
- Website: gzpoly.com

Poly Real Estate Group Co., Ltd.
- Simplified Chinese: 保利房地产(集团)股份有限公司
- Traditional Chinese: 保利房地產(集團)股份有限公司
Transcriptions

Poly Real Estate
- Simplified Chinese: 保利地产
- Traditional Chinese: 保利地產
Transcriptions

Poly Real Estate Group Co., Ltd. is a Chinese real estate developer, and a subsidiary of state-owned China Poly Group. It principally engaged in the design, development, construction and sale of residential and commercial properties, as well as the provision of property management services. It is engaged in residential and commercial property development and property management services in China.

Poly Real Estate is headquartered in Guangzhou, Guangdong Province. It was listed on the Shanghai Stock Exchange on 31 July 2006. Poly Real Estate is a consistent of blue chip indexes SSE 50 Index, FTSE China A50 Index and other indexes.

In 2015 Poly Real Estate launched Poly Global, a subsidiary that focuses on international developments. Poly Global began its operations initially in Australia as Poly Australia, and since then operations have expanded into the UK and USA. Poly Global's headquarters is in Hong Kong with offices in Sydney, Melbourne, Brisbane, London and Los Angeles.

== Land Holdings ==
As of September 2009 Poly Real Estate had land reserves totaling 23.5 million square meters.

== Shareholders ==
As of 31 December 2016, the largest and controlling shareholder of the company was state-owned China Poly Group, which owned 2.82% shares directly and via subsidiary "Poly Southern Group Co., Ltd." (Chinese: 保利南方集团有限公司) for an additional 38.05%. The Chinese Central Government also owned additional shares via China Securities Finance and Central Huijin. Other entities that owned >3% shares were private equity funds of Taikang Life Insurance (4.15%) and AnBang Property & Causality Insurance (3.41%).

== See also ==
- Poly Property, sister company
- Australian Villa
