= SSE Composite Index =

Stock market index

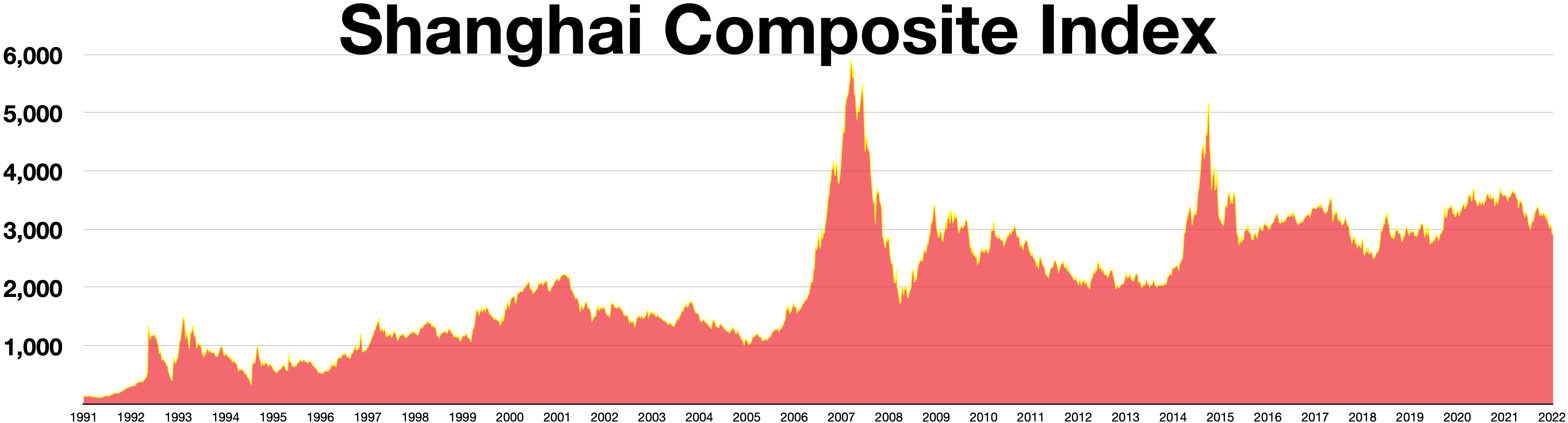
- Foundation: 15 July 1991; 35 years ago (launch date); 19 December 1990 (base date)
- Operator: Shanghai Stock Exchange; China Securities Index
- Exchanges: Shanghai Stock Exchange
- Trading symbol: SSE: 000001
- Constituents: all stock (A & B shares)
- Type: all cap
- Market cap: CN¥32.697 trillion (September 2017); CN¥12.727 trillion (free-float adjusted, September 2017)
- Website: Official website

SSE Composite Index
- Simplified Chinese: 上海证券交易所综合股价指数
Transcriptions
Standard Mandarin
- Hanyu Pinyin: Shànghǎi Zhèngquàn Jiāoyìsuǒ zōnghé gǔjià zhǐshù
- Wade–Giles: Shang-hai Chen-ch'üan Chiao-i-so ku-chia chih-shu
- Yale Romanization: Shànghǎi Jèngchywàn Jyāuyìswǒ gǔjyà jřshù
- IPA: [ʂâŋxàɪ ʈʂə̂ŋtɕʰɥɛ̂n tɕjáʊîswò kùtɕjâ ʈʂɻ̩̀ʂû]

Alternative Chinese name
- Simplified Chinese: 上证综合指数
Transcriptions

Second alternative Chinese name
- Simplified Chinese: 上证综指
Transcriptions

The SSE Composite Index (SSE Index) is a stock market index of all stocks (A shares and B shares) that are traded at the Shanghai Stock Exchange.

There are also SSE 180, SSE 50 and SSE Mega-Cap Indexes for top 180, 50 and 20 companies respectively, and the CSI 300 Index, which includes shares traded at the Shanghai Stock Exchange and the Shenzhen Stock Exchange.

== Weighting and calculation ==
SSE Indices are all calculated using a Paasche weighted composite price index formula. This means that the index is based on a base period on a specific base day for its calculation. The base day for SSE Composite Index is December 19, 1990, and the base period is the total market capitalization of all stocks of that day. The Base Value is 100. The index was launched on July 15, 1991.

- The formula is:

Current index = Current total market cap of constituents × Base Value / Base Period total market cap of constituents

Total market capitalization = Σ (price × shares issued)

- The B share stocks are generally denominated in US dollars for calculation purposes. For calculation of other indices, B share stock prices are converted to RMB at the applicable exchange rate (the middle price of US dollar on the last trading day of each week) at China Foreign Exchange Trading Center and then published by the exchange.

== Annual Returns ==
The following table shows the annual development of the SSE Composite Index since 1990.

Year	Closing level	Change in Index in Points	Change in Index in %
1990	127.61		
1991	292.75	165.14	129.41
1992	780.39	487.64	165.57
1993	833.80	53.41	6.84
1994	647.87	−185.93	−22.30
1995	555.28	−92.59	−14.29
1996	917.02	361.74	65.15
1997	1,194.10	277.08	30.22
1998	1,146.70	−43.39	−3.97
1999	1,366.58	219.88	19.18
2000	2,073.48	706.90	51.73
2001	1,645.97	−427.51	−20.62
2002	1,357.65	−288.32	−17.52
2003	1,497.04	139.39	10.27
2004	1,266.50	−230.55	−15.40
2005	1,161.05	−105.44	−8.33
2006	2,675.47	1,514.42	130.43
2007	5,261.56	2,586.09	96.66
2008	1,820.81	−3,440.75	−65.39
2009	3,277.14	1,456.33	79.98
2010	2,808.08	−469.06	−14.31
2011	2,199.42	−608.66	−21.68
2012	2,269.13	69.71	3.17
2013	2,115.98	−153.15	−6.75
2014	3,234.68	1,118.70	52.87
2015	3,539.18	304.50	9.41
2016	3,103.64	−435.54	−12.31
2017	3,307.17	203.53	6.56
2018	2,493.90	−813.27	−24.59
2019	3,050.12	556.22	22.30
2020	3,473.07	422.95	13.87
2021	3,639.78	166.71	4.80
2022	3,089.26	−550.52	−15.03
2023	2,974.93	−114.33	−3.70
2024	3,351.76	376.83	12.67
2025	3,968.84	617.08	18.41

== See also ==
- CSI 300 Index
- SSE 50 Index
- SZSE Component Index
- Hang Seng Index
- Taiwan Capitalization Weighted Stock Index
