= Gold mining in China =

Overview of gold mining in the People's Republic of China

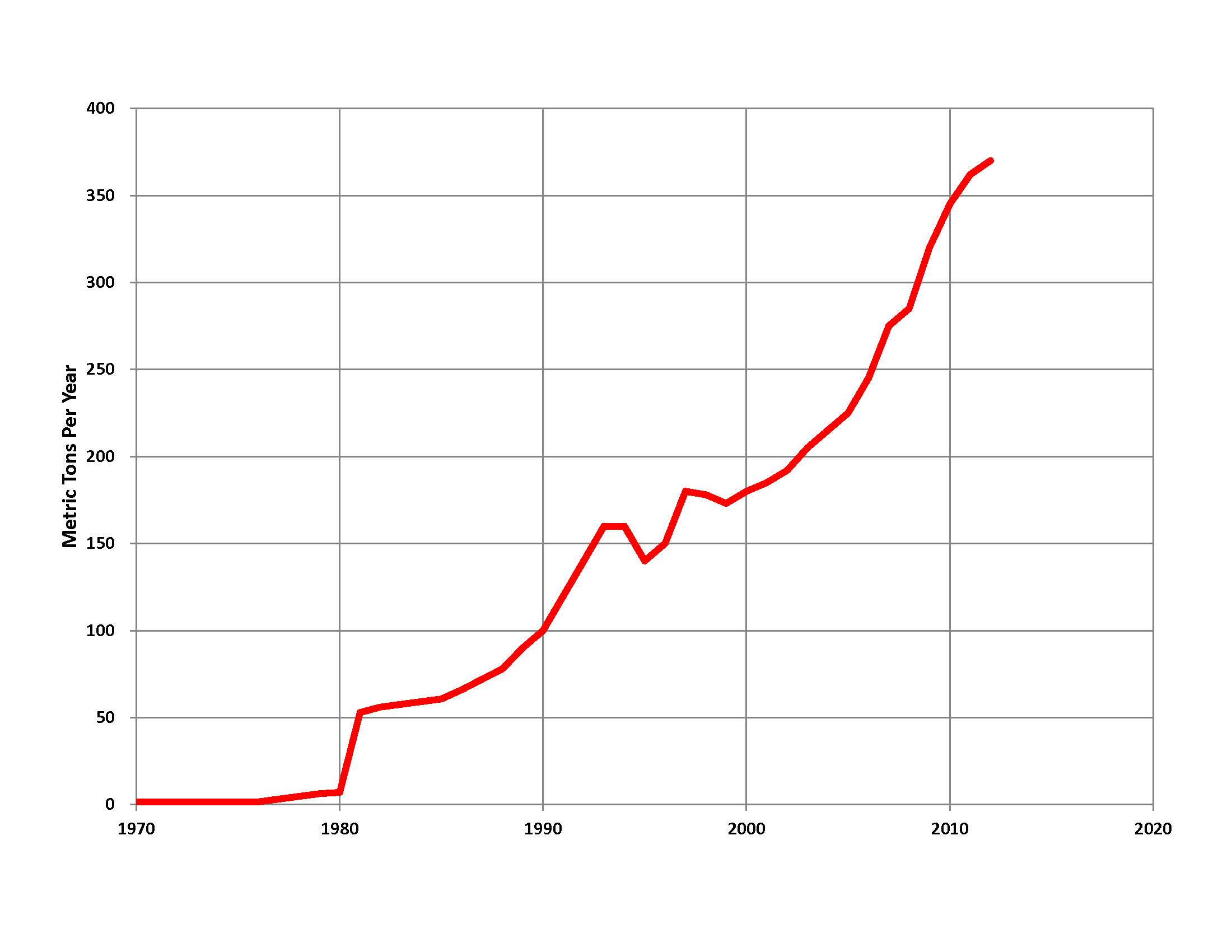
China's mined gold production by year

Gold mining in the People's Republic of China has propelled the country to become the world's largest gold producer since 2007. In 2022, China produced approximately 403 metric tons (403 t) of gold, maintaining its top global position.

== Historical and regional development ==
China overtook South Africa in 2007 to become the world’s largest gold producer, with output rising to 276 metric tons (276 t) that year, compared to South Africa’s 272 metric tons (272 t). South Africa had led gold production for over a century before declining due to rising costs and depleting reserves.

By 2022, China had maintained its top position with production reaching 403 metric tons (403 t), although it holds only around 7% of the world's known gold reserves. Mining is concentrated in eastern provinces like Shandong, Henan, Fujian, and Liaoning, with newer growth in the west, including Guizhou, Yunnan, and Tibet. A prominent site is in Maizhokunggar County near Lhasa.

== Industry structure and major companies ==
In 2000, over 2,000 mostly small and inefficient producers operated in China. By 2007, industry consolidation reduced that number to around 800. However, many firms still lag behind in technology and management compared to international standards.

The dominant domestic player is the China National Gold Group Corporation (CNGGC), which contributes about 20% of China’s total gold output and controls over 30% of national reserves. CNGGC also manages Zhongjin Gold, China’s first publicly listed gold mining company.

Starting in 2006, the Chinese government promoted outbound mining investment. By 2015, Chinese firms were involved in over 120 mining projects across Africa.

To support risk management in the domestic market, China launched its first gold futures market on the Shanghai Futures Exchange in 2008, enabling producers to hedge against volatile global prices.
