= Hang Seng China 50 Index =

Hang Seng China 50 Index (Chinese: 恒生神州50指數) is a pan-China stock market index to represent the top 50 China-based companies in the stock exchanges of Hong Kong, Shanghai and Shenzhen, which covers A share (shares circulated in mainland China), H share (shares circulated in Hong Kong from the mainland China incorporated company), red chip (shares circulated in Hong Kong from the companies incorporated outside mainland China with state-owned background) and P chip (shares circulated in Hong Kong from the companies with private background)

== Components ==
As of August 2022

Name	Ticker (A Share)	Ticker (H Share)	Weighting (%)	Industry
Tencent		SEHK: 700	9.53	Information Technology
Kweichow Moutai	SSE: 600519		8.06	Consumer Staples
Meituan		SEHK: 3690	5.72	Information Technology
Alibaba Group		SEHK: 9988	5.24	Information Technology
CATL	SZSE: 300750		5.01	Industrials
Ping An Insurance	SSE: 601318	SEHK: 2318	4.9	Financials
China Construction Bank	SSE: 601939	SEHK: 939	3.7	Financials
ICBC	SSE: 601398	SEHK: 1398	3.23	Financials
BYD Company	SZSE: 002594	SEHK: 1211	3.13	Consumer Discretionary
LONGi	SSE: 601012		2.44	Industrials
Wuliangye Yibin	SZSE: 000858		2.4	Consumer Staples
China Merchants Bank	SSE: 600036	SEHK: 3968	2.36	Financials
JD.com		SEHK: 9618	2.32	Information Technology
Industrial Bank	SSE: 601166		2.11	Financials
China Mobile	SSE: 600941	SEHK: 941	2.1	Telecommunications
Midea Group	SZSE: 000333		1.93	Consumer Discretionary
Bank of China	SSE: 601988	SEHK: 3988	1.9	Financials
Agricultural Bank of China	SSE: 601288	SEHK: 1288	1.86	Financials
CITIC Securities	SSE: 600030	SEHK: 6030	1.63	Financials
China Yangtze Power	SSE: 600900		1.62	Utilities
WuXi AppTec	SSE: 603259	SEHK: 2359	1.48	Healthcare
Muyuan Foodstuff	SZSE: 002714		1.39	Consumer Staples
Xiaomi		SEHK: 1810	1.32	Information Technology
China Shenhua Energy	SSE: 601088	SEHK: 1088	1.28	Energy
Luxshare	SZSE: 002475		1.28	Industrials
CITS Group Corporation	SSE: 601888		1.27	Consumer Discretionary
CNOOC Limited	SSE: 600938	SEHK: 883	1.24	Energy
Mindray	SZSE: 300760		1.21	Healthcare
PetroChina	SSE: 601857	SEHK: 857	1.15	Energy
Gree	SZSE: 000651		1.12	Consumer Discretionary
Jiangsu Hengrui Medicine	SSE: 600276		1.07	Healthcare
Bank of Communications	SSE: 601328	SEHK: 3328	1.05	Financials
Sinopec	SSE: 600028	SEHK: 386	1.04	Energy
Wanhua Chemical Group	SSE: 600309		1.03	Materials
Shanghai Pudong Development Bank	SSE: 600000		0.95	Financials
Vanke	SZSE: 000002	SEHK: 2202	0.95	Properties & Construction
Kuaishou		SEHK: 1024	0.95	Information Technology
China Life Insurance Company	SSE: 601628	SEHK: 2628	0.93	Financials
Shanxi Xinghuacun Fen Wine Factory	SSE: 600809		0.93	Consumer Staples
Hikvision	SZSE: 002415		0.84	Information Technology
Foshan Haitian Flavouring & Food Co	SSE: 603288		0.83	Consumer Staples
Ping An Bank	SZSE: 000001		0.83	Financials
Postal Savings Bank of China	SSE: 601658	SEHK: 1658	0.82	Financials
SF Holding	SZSE: 002352		0.72	Industrials
China Pacific Insurance Company	SSE: 601601	SEHK: 2601	0.71	Financials
Nongfu Spring		SEHK: 9633	0.61	Consumer Staples
NetEase		SEHK: 9999	0.57	Information Technology
Great Wall Motor	SSE: 601633	SEHK: 2333	0.54	Consumer Discretionary
Baidu		SEHK: 9888	0.43	Information Technology
Yihai Kerry	SZSE: 300999		0.28	Consumer Staples

== Index tracking fund ==
- Hang Seng China 50 Index Fund by Hang Seng Investment Management Limited
