= China CITIC Bank =

Chinese state-owned banking corporation

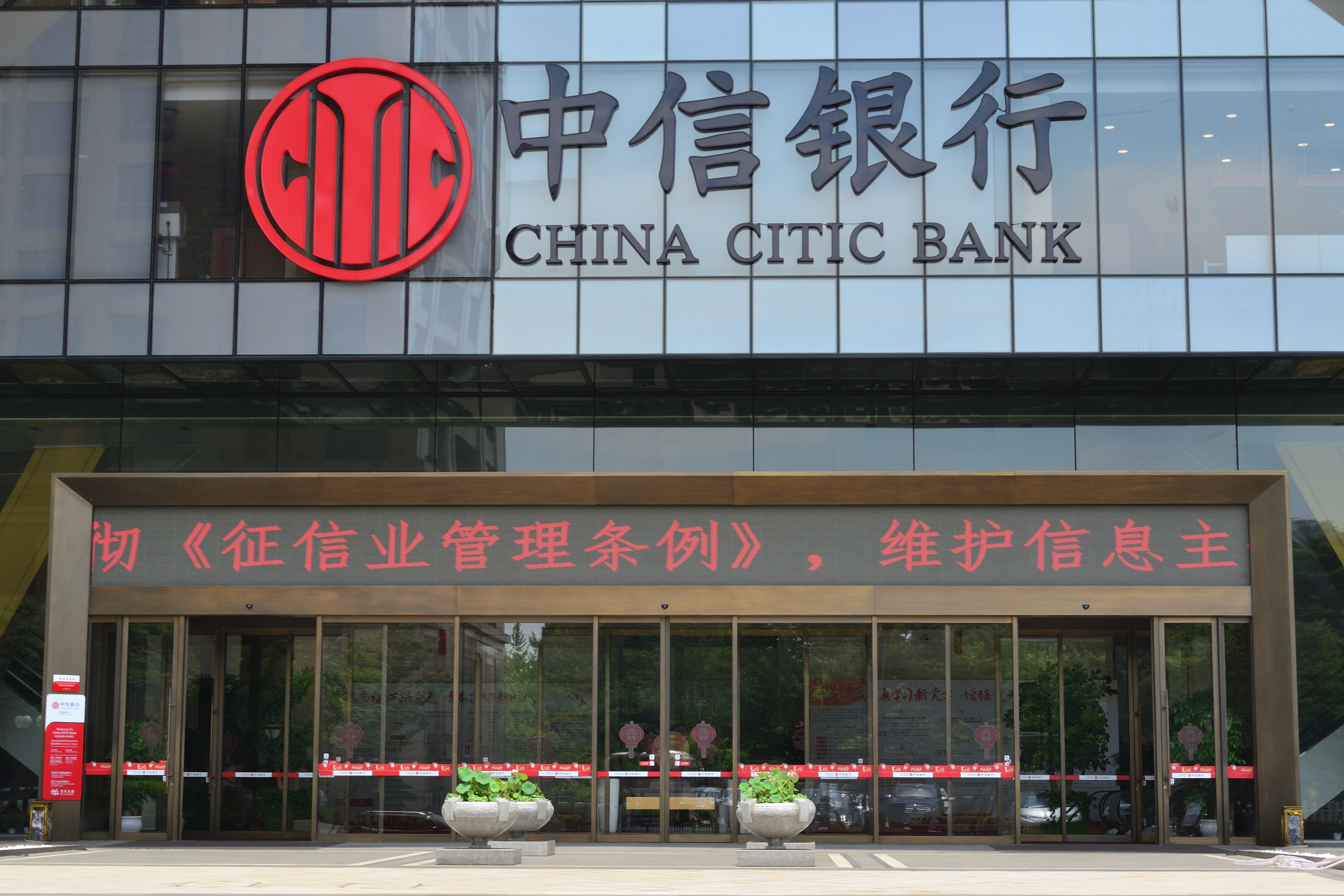
- China CITIC Bank in Hangzhou
- Native name: 中信银行
- Company type: Public
- Traded as: SSE: 601998 (A share); SEHK: 998 (H share); SSE Composite Component
- Industry: Banking
- Founded: April 1987; 39 years ago
- Headquarters: Beijing, Hong Kong, China
- Area served: People's Republic of China
- Key people: Zhu Hexin (chairman); Fang Heying (president)
- Revenue: US$28.98 billion
- Net income: US$8.63 billion
- Total assets: US$1.265 trillion
- Owner: CITIC Group
- Number of employees: 59,258 (2021)
- Parent: CITIC Limited
- Website: www.citicbank.com

China CITIC Bank
- Simplified Chinese: 中信银行
- Traditional Chinese: 中信銀行
Transcriptions
Standard Mandarin
- Hanyu Pinyin: Zhōngxìn Yínháng

China CITIC Bank is a major commercial bank in China, under CITIC Group.

Established in 1987, it is a nationally comprehensive and internationally oriented commercial bank. The bank operates in Hong Kong, Macau, New York, Los Angeles, Singapore and London, and maintains a strong foothold on the mainland banking industry. The bank operates 163 branches in the mainland, and 1,252 sub-branches, located in economically developed regions of China.

== History ==
=== Origins ===
In 1984, the chairman of CITIC group at the time, Rong Yiren (荣毅仁), requested that the Chinese government create a banking division under his company, to fully embody the needs for foreign exchange. This move was approved by the People's Bank of China, and a banking division was created under CITIC group in April 1985. At this point, the bank was based on the original finance department, expanding its operations regarding external financing, foreign exchange transactions, loans, international settlement, finance leases and deposits. In April 1987, the bank was formally established as a separate legal entity, following approval from the People's Bank of China and the State Council of China.

=== 2000–present ===
China CITIC Bank's businesses flourished in the first decade of the 21st century. In July 2000, CITIC bank became the first bank in China to be certified by the China Financial Certificate Authority for online banking. In July 2002, the bank improved its international standing by ranking 291st on the "Top 1000 World Banks" list released by The Banker magazine of the United Kingdom, ranking within the top 300 for the first time. In November 2006, the bank welcomed its first major foreign investment, when BBVA, the second largest bank in Spain, became a major shareholder. This move established a co-operative relationship. On 27 April 2007, China CITIC Bank was listed on the Hong Kong and Shanghai stock exchanges.

In May 2017 the A share of the company was removed from the constituents of SSE 50 Index; it remained in SSE 180 Index.
