= SSE 180 Index =

Shanghai Stock Exchange top 180 index

- Foundation: 1 July 2002; 24 years ago (launch date); 28 June 2002 (base date)
- Operator: Shanghai Stock Exchange; China Securities Index
- Exchanges: Shanghai Stock Exchange
- Constituents: 180
- Type: large to mid cap A share
- Market cap: CN¥20.467 trillion (September 2017); CN¥7.365 trillion (free-float adjusted, September 2017)
- Related indices: SSE Mega-Cap (sub-index); SSE 50 (sub-index); SSE MidCap (sub index); SSE 380; SSE Composite (all cap index)
- Website: www.csindex.com.cn/en/indices/index-detail/000010

SSE 180 Index is the stock index of Shanghai Stock Exchange, representing the top 180 companies by "float-adjusted" capitalization and other criteria. SSE 180 is a sub-index of SSE Composite Index, the latter included all shares of the exchange.

== Related indexes ==
Both SSE 50 Index and SSE MidCap Index (Chinese: 上证中盘指数) were the subindex of SSE 180 Index. They did not intersect each other.

By a different selection criteria than SSE 50, SSE Mega-Cap Index is also the sub-index of SSE 180. It consists of the top 20 companies with a cap of 6 from each kind of industries. The subindex may intersect with SSE 50 Index. SSE Mega-Cap started to publish in 2009.

== See also ==
- SSE Composite Index
