= Zhongjin Gold =

Chinese gold and non-ferrous metals mining company

Zhongjin Gold Corporation Limited
- Native name: 中金黄金股份有限公司
- Type: Public
- Traded as: SSE: 600489; CSI Midcap 200
- Industry: Mining, non-ferrous metals
- Headquarters: Beijing, China
- Area served: China and abroad
- Products: Gold, copper, platinum
- Revenue: ¥28.53 billion (H1 2024)
- Net income: ¥1.74 billion (H1 2024)
- Website: zjgold.chinagoldgroup.com

Zhongjin Gold Corporation Limited (中金黄金股份有限公司) is a major Chinese mining company engaged primarily in the production of gold, copper, and other non-ferrous metals. The company is headquartered in Beijing and listed on the Shanghai Stock Exchange under the ticker symbol SSE: 600489.

== Mining Operations ==
Zhongjin Gold operates several major mines across China. Its flagship asset is the Dazhuohan Gold Mine, which has an annual processing capacity of approximately 500,000 metric tonnes of concentrate.

In Shandong Province, the company expanded its operations by acquiring two significant gold production enterprises, outbidding Shandong Gold in a high-profile deal.

Zhongjin Gold is also actively developing the Shaling Gold Mine under its subsidiary Laizhou Zhongjin. Construction is expected to be completed by mid-2025. The mine is forecast to produce 11 metric tonnes of gold annually during its first phase, with steady-state output of approximately 6.6 metric tonnes per year.

In March 2025, Zhongjin approved a tailings pond expansion project at the Wunugetushan Copper-Molybdenum Mine in Inner Mongolia, aimed at increasing capacity and prolonging mine life.

== Accident ==
On July 23, 2025, six students from Northeastern University were visiting and learning about flotation technology at the Unugtu Mountain Copper-Molybdenum Mine Concentrator of China National Gold Group Inner Mongolia Mining Co., Ltd., a subsidiary of China National Gold Group Corporation. They fell into the flotation tank and died due to a falling grid plate. Afterwards, three responsible personnel of the company were taken into criminal coercive measures.
