= Hangzhou Silan Microelectronics =

Chinese semiconductor company

Hangzhou Silan Microelectronics Co., Ltd
- Trade name: Silan
- Native name: 杭州士兰微电子股份有限公司
- Company type: Public
- Traded as: SSE: 600460 (A Shares)
- Industry: Semiconductors
- Founded: 25 September 1997; 28 years ago
- Founder: Chen Xiangdong
- Headquarters: Hangzhou, Zhejiang, China
- Key people: Chen Xiangdong (Chairman); Zheng Shaobo (CEO)
- Revenue: ▲CN¥9.34 billion (2023)
- Net income: ▼CN¥−48.78 million (2023)
- Total assets: ▲CN¥23.91 billion (2023)
- Total equity: ▲CN¥13.42 billion (2023)
- Number of employees: 9,294 (2023)
- Website: www.silan.com.cn

Silan Microelectronics (Silan; Chinese: 士兰微电子; pinyin: Shì Lán Wéi Diànzǐ) is a publicly listed Chinese semiconductor company headquartered in Hangzhou.

The company focuses on the design of integrated circuit (IC) chip and the manufacturing of semiconductor microelectronics-related products. It is one of the largest integrated device manufacturers (IDM) in China.

== Background ==
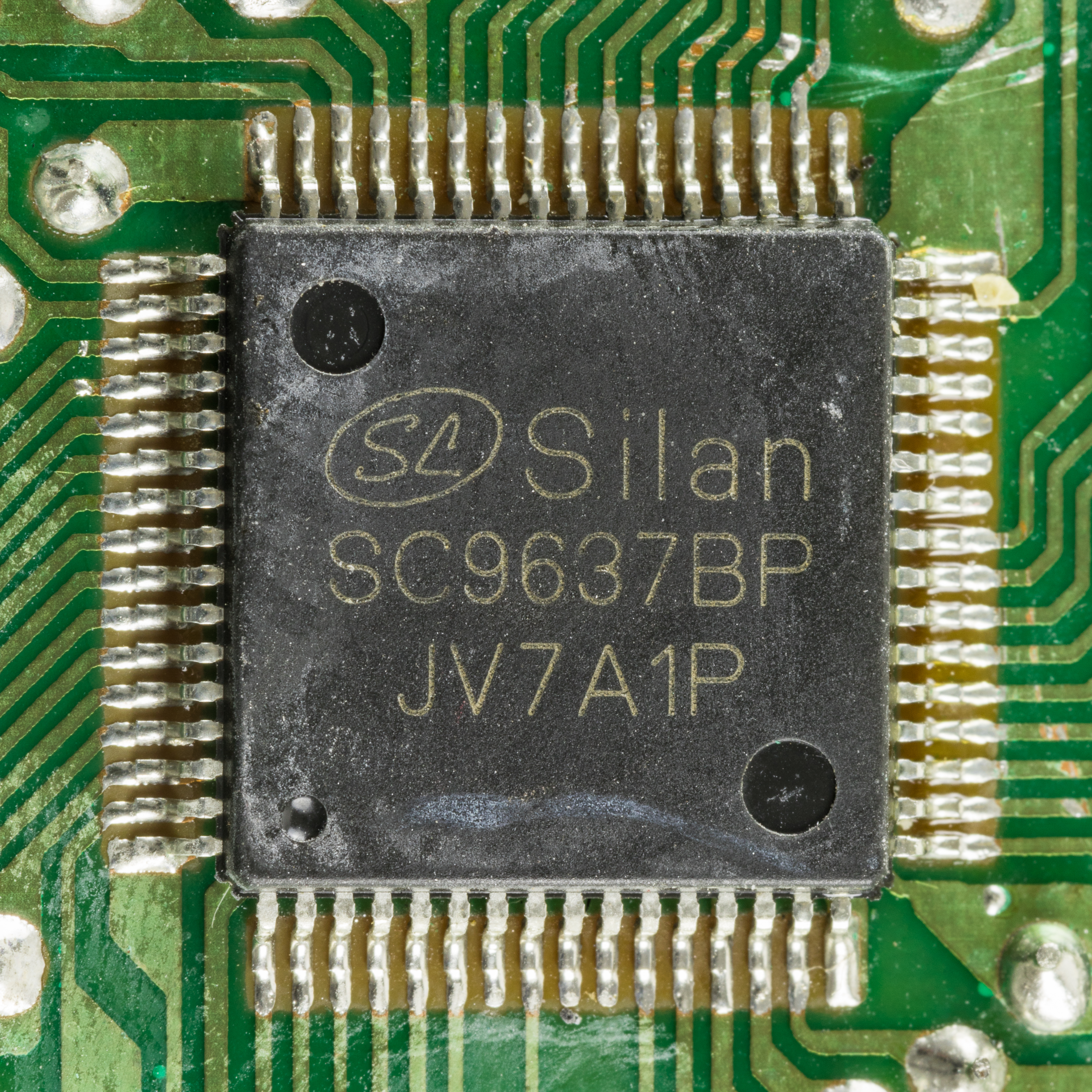
Silan Microelectronics SC9637BP

On 25 September 1997, inspired by a speech during Deng Xiaoping's southern tour, Chen Xiangdong and six other partners founded Silan. It was one of the first private IC manufacturing companies in China.

On 11 March 2003, Silan held its initial public offering becoming a listed company on the Shanghai Stock Exchange. It was the first IC design company to be publicly listed in China.

Silan originally started with a 5-inch wafer chip production line that produced 5,000 pieces a month. After its listing, Silan started building its 6-inch production line.

During the 2008 financial crisis, Silan suffered due to a decline in sales orders and a tight cash flow caused by banks requiring it to provide additional loan guarantees. The Hangzhou Municipal Government provided Silan with relief which allowed Silan to repay the loan in six months and emerge from the crisis. After the crisis, Silan adjusted its product line from traditional consumer electronics to more high-end products which were in line with the IDM model.

In 2017, Silan's 8-inch wafer fab started production making it the first in China. By 2020, its monthly production capacity reached 60,000 pieces. It received over 1 billion yuan in funding support from the China Integrated Circuit Industry Investment Fund (ICF).

In February 2022 it was reported that ICF planned to invest 600 million yuan into Silan's 12-inch chip project that was launched in 2021.

In October 2022, Silan announced it aimed to raise 6.5 billion yuan via private placement to expand its output of vehicle power semiconductors due to domestic demand.

== See also ==
- Hangzhou Changchuan Technology
- Semiconductor industry in China
