= Changzhou Xingyu Automotive Lighting Systems =

Chinese automotive lighting manufacturer

Changzhou Xingyu Automotive Lighting Systems is an automotive lighting manufacturer in Changzhou, Jiangsu Province, China. Established in 1993, it produced automotive lighting systems for carmakers such as Volkswagen, Mercedes-Benz, BMW, General Motors and so on. The company operates 12 factories in China and Niš, Serbia, 16 research centers globally. In 2025, the company has a market share of 11.6% in China, ranking first. Globally, its market share reaches 4.6%, ranking seventh.

On October 10, 2026, Changzhou Xingyu opened its first U.S. factory in Landis, North Carolina, in which it has invested $50 million and is expected to create up to 500 jobs by 2027.

== Labor Scandal ==
In 2026, Xingyu was involved in a labor scandal where the company had forced 107 newly-hired college graduates to resign without proper compensation. Afterwards, the victims reported their grievances to European companies such as Volkswagen and Hong Kong Exchanges and Clearing, after which Xingyu apologized and agreed to compensate the victims.

Volkswagen has launched investigation into the mass dismissal of the college graduates and said it would take "appropriate steps".
