= Montage Technology =

Chinese Semiconductor Company

Montage Technology Co., Ltd.
- Native name: 澜起科技股份有限公司
- Company type: Public
- Traded as: SSE: 688008; CSI A100; SEHK: 6809
- Industry: Semiconductors
- Founded: 27 May 2004; 22 years ago
- Founders: Howard Yang; Stephen Tai
- Headquarters: Shanghai, China
- Key people: Howard Yang (Chairman & CEO); Stephen Tai (President)
- Revenue: ▼CN¥2.29 billion (2023)
- Net income: ▼CN¥451.15 million (2023)
- Total assets: ▲CN¥10.67 billion (2023)
- Total equity: ▲CN¥10.21 billion (2023)
- Number of employees: 767 (2023)
- Website: www.montage-tech.com

Montage Technology (Montage; Chinese: 澜起科技; pinyin: Lánqǐ Kējì) is a publicly listed Chinese semiconductor design company that manufactures integrated circuits for cloud computing and artificial intelligence.

== Background ==
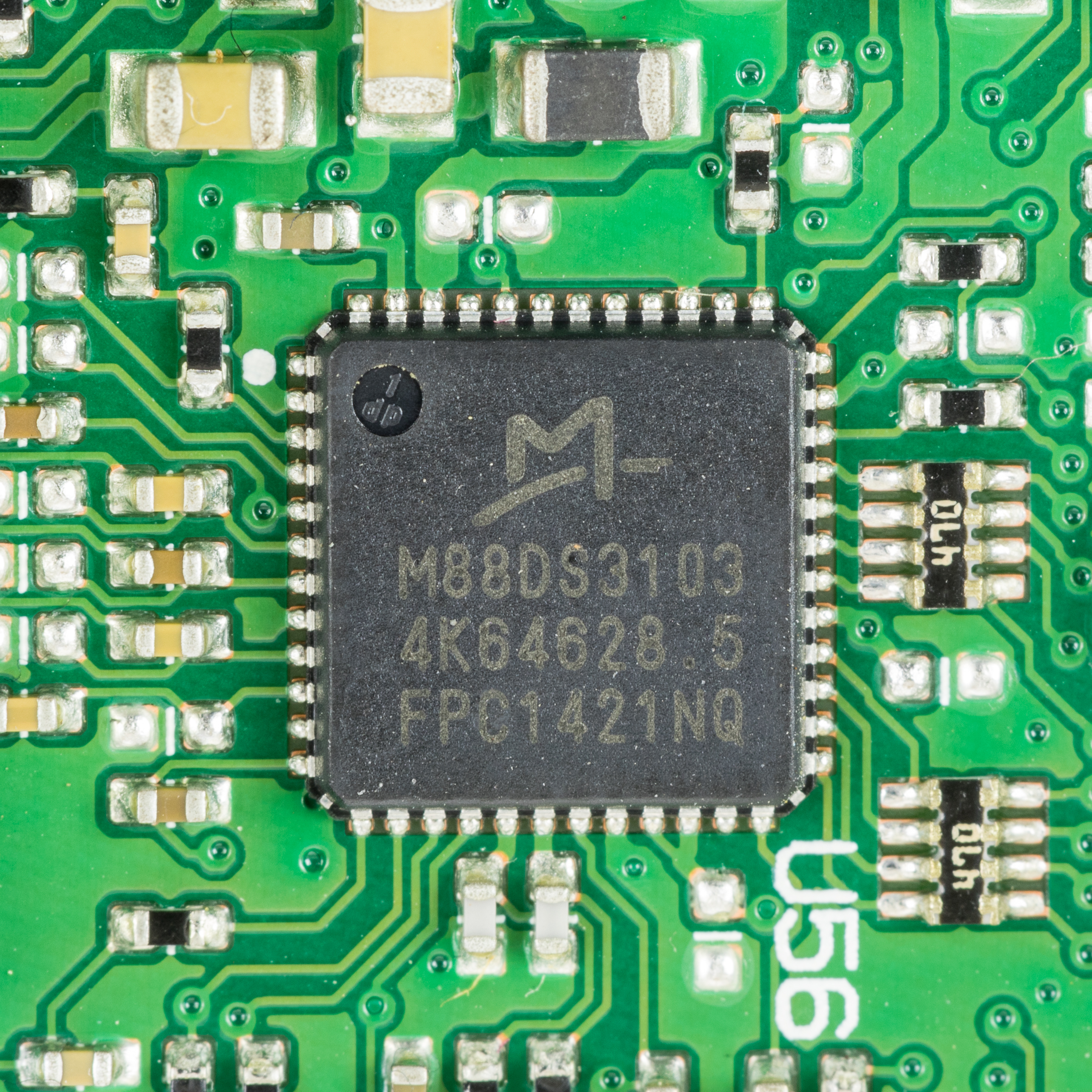
Montage Technology M88DS3103

Montage was founded in 2004 in Shanghai by Howard Yang and Stephen Tai who studied and worked in the US. Yang was a vice president at Integrated Device Technology while Tai was member of the core founding team at Marvell Technology.

During its first decade, Montage build a business selling analog and radio chips, DSPs, and interface transceivers. Intel Capital funded the company twice in 2006 and 2008. In June 2008, Montage registered its first memory product.

On 26 September 2013, Montage held its initial public offering in the US and became a listed company on the Nasdaq under the ticker 'MONT' and raised US$71 million.

In February 2014, short seller Gravity Research released a report on Montage with a "strong sell" rating causing Montage shares to fall almost 15%. The report stated that Montage was committing fraud and its revenue was overstated. LQW Technology Company Limited, a Hong Kong entity which Montage claims accounted for 71% of its revenue was secretly owned by an undisclosed entity that was established and owned by Montage. In response Montage stated the report lacked accuracy and denied that LQW Technology Company Limited was related to Montage. Next month in March, Hedge fund Aristides Capital released a report supporting Gravity Research's assertions and had shorted Montage shares.

In June 2014, Montage agreed to be taken private by Shanghai Pudong Science & Technology Investment for US$693 million. Montage was then subsequently delisted from the Nasdaq.

In October 2014, the audit committee completed its review and concluded that the allegations were unfounded. The acquisition proceeded in November, valuing Montage's equity at US$693m. The fraud allegations against Montage remain unproven given that there were no management or auditor resignations.

In 2015, Montage attempted to acquire Pericom Semiconductor Corp and in October made an unsolicited offer of US$435 million. However Pericom rejected the offer citing financing and regulatory risks. In November, Pericom agreed to be acquire by Diodes Incorporated for US$413 million.

In January 2016, Intel stated it had formed a chip venture with Montage and Tsinghua University. Tsinghua would develop a reconfigurable computing processor module and associated system software that would work with a standard Xeon microprocessor. Montage would commercialize the product for sale in the Chinese market.

In May 2018, Montage reactivated fundraising. Investors included CITIC Securities and China Electronics Corporation. However the China Integrated Circuit Industry Investment Fund did not invest in it despite being related to semiconductors.

On 22 July 2019, Montage was one of the first companies that were listed on the Shanghai Stock Exchange STAR Market. Between the first day of trading on Monday to Wednesday, its shares jumped 206%. Intel which still had a 9% stake in Montage from the time Intel Capital invested in it made a 528% return with its stake being worth $1.1 billion.

In December 2023, Montage unveiled its 5th Gen Jintide lineup of processors which were repackaged Intel Emerald Rapids.

On 9 January 2026, Montage held a secondary listing on the Hong Kong Stock Exchange.

== See also ==
- Intel
- Semiconductor industry in China
