= Satellite Chemical =

Chemical company

Satellite Chemical Co. Ltd.
- Formerly: Zhejiang Satellite Petrochemical Co Ltd
- Company type: Public company
- Traded as: SZSE: 002648
- Industry: Chemicals; Petrochemicals
- Headquarters: Jiaxing, Zhejiang, China
- Revenue: ▲CNY 28,462 million (2021)
- Net income: ▲CNY 6,007 million (2021)
- Total assets: ▲CNY 48,692 million (2021)
- Number of employees: 3,409 (2021)
- Subsidiaries: Lianyungang Petrochemical Co., Ltd. Pinghu Petro Chemical Co., Ltd. Zhejiang Satellite Energy Co., Ltd. Zhejiang Union Chemicals Industry Co., Ltd. Satellite Chemical USA Corp, etc.
- Website: stl-chem.com

Satellite Chemical Co Ltd (STL) (Chinese: 卫星化学), formerly known as Zhejiang Satellite Petrochemical Co Ltd (Chinese: 浙江卫星石化), formerly known as Zhejiang Satellite Acrylic Manufacturing Co. (Chinese: 浙江卫星丙烯酸制造有限公司), is a Chinese chemical company that focuses on research, development, production, and sales of chemicals. The company's primary businesses include the production and sale of petrochemical products.

== Products ==
Satellite Chemical engages in C2 and C3 industrial chain. Its products includes acrylic acid esters, methacrylic acids, pigment intermediates, acrylic emulsion polymers, super absorbent polymers, and other products.

== History ==
Zhejiang Satellite Petrochemical was founded in 2005, formerly known as Zhejiang Satellite Acrylic Manufacturing Co.

On December 28, 2011, Satellite Chemical became a publicly traded company on the Shenzhen Stock Exchange.

In 2014, Satellite Chemical started to install a new pressure swing adsorption (PSA) unit from Honeywell UOP to supply high-purity hydrogen to its integrated refining and petrochemicals complex in Pinghu City, Zhejiang Province, China. The PSA unit, based on Honeywell UOP's Polybed PSA technology, purifies hydrogen generated by an associated UOP C3 Oleflex propane dehydrogenation (PDH) unit also in use at the complex.

In 2020, Satellite Chemical has obtained regulatory approval to construct a $4.2 billion petrochemical complex in Jiangsu province to process ethane from the United States.

Satellite Chemical was ranked #1999 in the Forbes Global 2000 in 2022. Satellite Chemical was ranked 242nd in the Fortune China Top 500 in 2023.

== Society Event ==
The 2019 Lianyungang·Satellite International Marathon, also known as the Satellite Chemical Cup, was approved by the city government and held on October 20 in Xuwei New District, Lianyungang, China. Organized by the Chinese Athletics Association, Jiangsu Provincial Sports Bureau, and Lianyungang City Government, the event was hosted by the Administrative Committee of the National East-Central-West Regional Cooperation Demonstration Zone and Lianyungang City Sports Bureau. The marathon combined full (42.195 km), half (21.0975 km), and mini marathon (about 5 km) races, attracting 15,000 participants, including 150 international runners.
