= Shanghai International Airport =

Shanghai Airport may refer to one of these airports serving Shanghai, China:

- Shanghai Pudong International Airport
- Shanghai Hongqiao International Airport
