= SEMCORP Group =

Chinese corporation

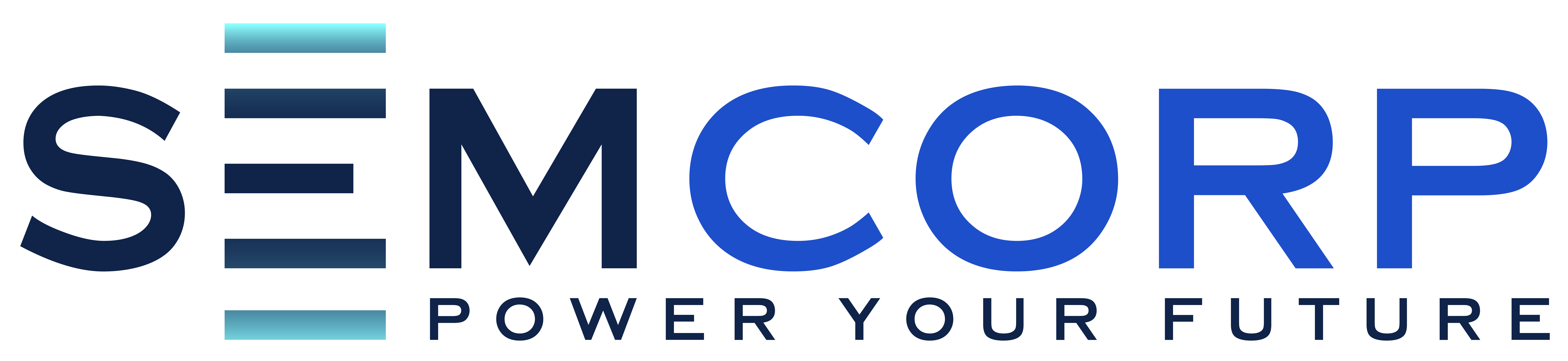

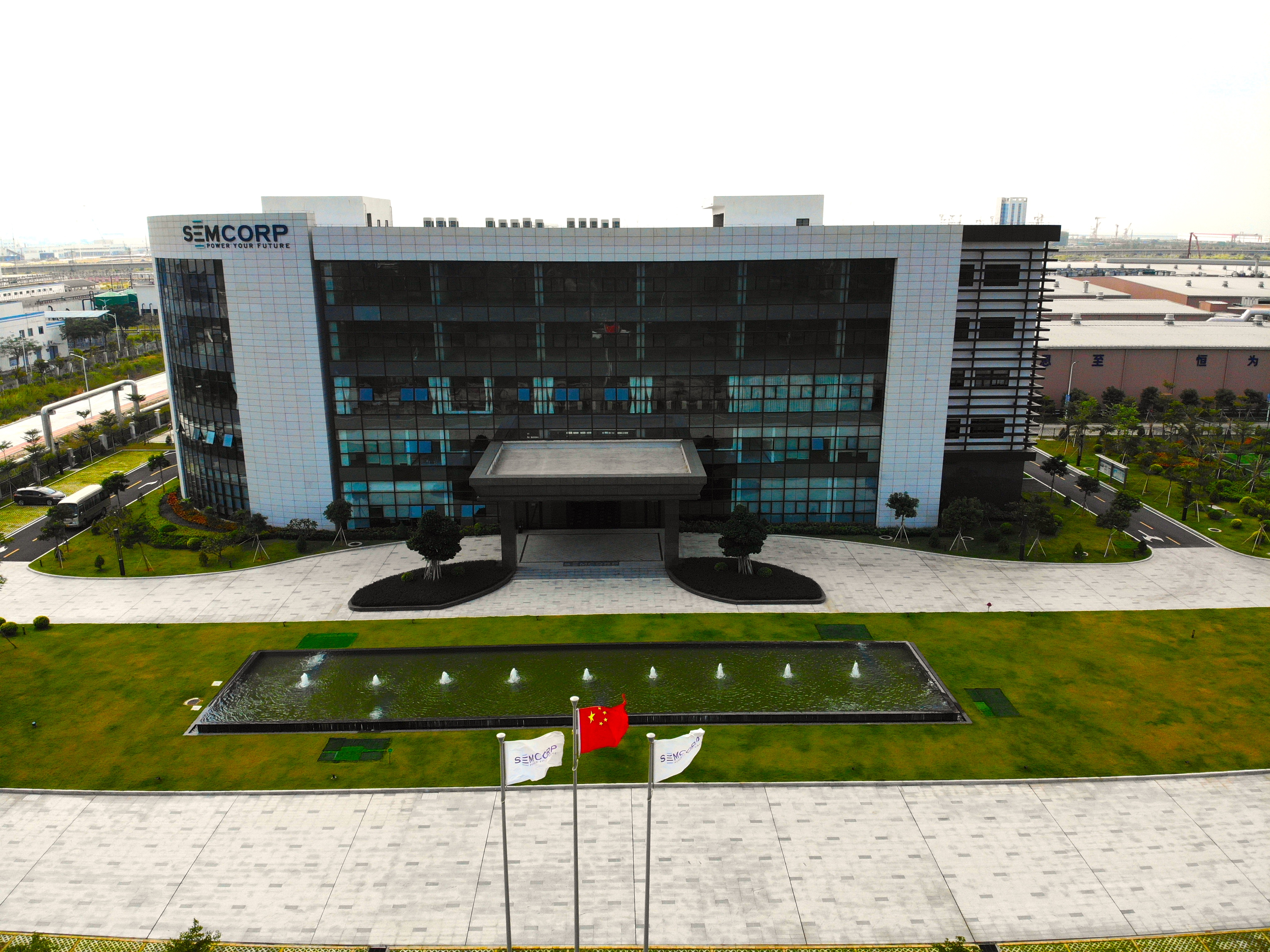
- Office at SEMCORP's Zhuhai production facility
- Native name: 云南恩捷新材料股份有限公司
- Type: Public
- ISIN: CND10003VXB9
- Industry: Chemicals; Advanced materials; Packaging; Printing
- Headquarters: Shanghai, China
- Area served: Worldwide
- Key people: Paul Xiaoming Lee (co-founder, chairman & CEO); Tony Xiaohua Li (vice chairman)
- Brands: SEMCORP
- Revenue: ▲CN¥4.28 billion (US$656.14 million) (2020)
- Net income: ▲CN¥1.176 billion (US$180.1 million) (2020)
- Number of employees: 5,040 (2020)
- Website: semcorpglobal.com

SEMCORP Group, formally Yunnan Energy New Material Co. Ltd. (Chinese: 云南恩捷新材料股份有限公司), is a multinational corporation headquartered in China that specializes in the development and manufacture of advanced materials. It is the world's largest producer of lithium-ion battery separator film by volume, and is a major supplier to global electric vehicle battery makers including LG Chem, CATL, BYD, and Samsung SDI. Its other products include printing packages, packing boxes, liquid wrapping papers, high-grade wrapping papers, biaxially oriented polypropylene films and other related products. SEMCORP Group is listed on the Shenzhen Stock Exchange (ticker: 002812.SZ).

== History ==
SEMCORP Group was founded by brothers Paul Xiaoming Lee and Tony Xiaohua Li. Lee and Li studied and worked in the United States in the late 1980s and early 1990s, and returned to China in 1996 to start their business. Their first business was the manufacture of cigarette labels and packages.

In 2019, SEMCORP Group overtook Asahi Kasei to become the largest supplier of lithium-ion battery separator film in the world.

In November 2019, SEMCORP Group announced a licensing deal with Teijin Ltd., a global leader in coating technology, for the manufacture of coated separators.

In November 2020, SEMCORP Group announced its first overseas facility to manufacture lithium-ion battery separator film in Debrecen, Hungary, which cost 65 billion forints.

In January 2021, SEMCORP Group announced its first international joint venture with U.S.-based Polypore International, LP to manufacture dry-process separator film in China.

In August 2021, SEMCORP Group and Chinese battery maker EVE announced a joint venture to manufacture lithium-ion battery separator film in China.

In May 2022, SEMCORP Group announced its first North American facility to manufacture lithium-ion battery separator film in Sidney, Ohio.

== 2026 Environmental and Safety Incidents ==
In June 2026, the Hajdú–Bihar County Government Office ordered that the operations of the Debrecen battery manufacturing plant be suspended with immediate effect, stating that the plant's activities deviated from what was specified in its Integrated Pollution Prevention and Control licence, thus threatening the environment and polluting it. During an on-site inspection in February, an unidentified, steaming substance with a pungent odor was found seeping into the soil, which a Semcorp representative claimed to be condensation water. Tests conducted by NGOs also found solvents and other industrial chemicals in the stream near the plant which manufactures separator film used in batteries. Investigations revealed elevated levels of arsenic, lead, cadmium, and lithium, aluminum concentrations that exceeded the legal limit by a factor of 13,000.

Furthermore, In July 2026, authorities identified critical safety violations at the facility such as malfunctioning fire pumps, improperly modified gas sensors, and a disconnected water supply to the sprinkler system.

In response to these compounding violations, the municipality of Debrecen ordered the immediate suspension of all plant operations pending the resolution of these issues. Additionally, the company was issued a fire safety fine of 3 million HUF (approximately €8,500). Debrecen Mayor László Papp stated "SEMCORP has broken every promise it has ever made, therefore I must say that Semcorp's activities are not welcome in Debrecen."
