= OmniVision Group =

Chinese fabless semiconductor manufacturing company

OmniVision Integrated Circuits Group, Inc.
- Trade name: OmniVision Group
- Native name: 豪威集成电路（集团）股份有限公司
- Formerly: Will Semiconductor
- Company type: Public
- Traded as: SSE: 603501 (A Shares); SEHK: 501 (H Shares); SIX: WILL (GDR); CSI A100; SSE 50
- Industry: Semiconductors
- Founded: 15 May 2007; 19 years ago
- Founder: Yu Renrong
- Headquarters: Shanghai, China
- Key people: Yu Renrong (Chairman); Wang Song (CEO)
- Revenue: ▲CN¥21.02 billion (2023)
- Net income: ▼CN¥543.82 million (2023)
- Total assets: ▲CN¥37.74 billion (2023)
- Total equity: ▲CN¥21.50 billion (2023)
- Number of employees: 4,800 (2023)
- Subsidiaries: OmniVision Technologies
- Website: www.omnivision-group.com

OmniVision Integrated Circuits Group, Inc. (OmniVision Group; Chinese: 豪威集团; pinyin: Háowēi jítuán) is a Chinese publicly listed fabless semiconductor company headquartered in Shanghai.

Its primary focus is on research and development for semiconductor design and sale of semiconductor devices. Its products are applied in the fields of mobile communications, vehicle electronics, Internet of things devices, and security products.

Together with its subsidiaries including OmniVision Technologies (OmniVision), the company does business as OmniVision Group.

== Background ==
WillSemi was founded on 15 May 2007 by Yu Renrong. He previously worked at Inspur.

On 4 May 2017, WillSemi held its initial public offering becoming a listed company on the Shanghai Stock Exchange.

Due to the lack of core technological competitiveness, WillSemi could only engage in the distribution business with low technological content. To improve its competitiveness, it has acquired various other semiconductor firms in the past decade.

On 5 June 2017 it planned to acquire OmniVision but its main shareholder Zhuhai Rongfeng objected to the plan as it saw Wingtech was also interested in acquiring OmniVision leading to the first M&A attempt failing. After some changes in OmniVision shareholders, WillSemi made another attempt to acquire OmniVision in May 2018 with the deal being successfully completed in May 2019. The acquisition meant WillSemi could now enter the CMOS Image sensor (CIS) technology market as well as have leverage OmniVision's technical expertise to improve its semiconductor design capabilities. The deal made WillSemi the world's third-largest supplier of CIS, behind Sony and Samsung Electronics.

In November 2023, WillSemi held a global depository receipt (GDR) offering on the SIX Swiss Exchange. Raising US$445 million, it was China's largest GDR offering since 2005.

In May 2025, WillSemi rebranded as OmniVision Group.

On 12 January 2026, OmniVision Group held a secondary listing on the Hong Kong Stock Exchange.

== See also ==
- Semiconductor industry in China
