= Oppein Home Group =

Chinese furniture company

Oppein Home Group Inc.
- Native name: 欧派家居集团股份有限公司
- Type: Public
- Traded as: SSE: 603833
- Industry: Furniture, cabinetry
- Founded: 1 July 1994; 32 years ago
- Founder: Yao Liangsong
- Headquarters: Baiyun District, Guangzhou, China
- Area served: Worldwide
- Key people: Yao Liangsong (chairman)
- Products: Kitchen cabinets, wardrobes, wooden doors, and others
- Number of employees: 17,880 (2025)
- Website: www.oppeinhome.com

Oppein Home Group Inc. (Chinese: 欧派家居集团股份有限公司; pinyin: Ōupài Jiājū Jítuán Gǔfèn Yǒuxiàn Gōngsī), stylized as OPPEIN, is a public Chinese furniture company headquartered in Guangzhou, Guangdong. The company designs, manufactures, sells, and installs customized kitchen cabinets, wardrobes, custom furniture, and wooden doors.

Oppein was founded in 1994 and is one of the largest manufacturers of custom furniture in China by revenue. The company has been listed on the Shanghai Stock Exchange since March 2017.

== History ==
The business was established on 1 July 1994, when founder Yao Liangsong (姚良松) set up a kitchen cabinet company in Guangzhou. Yao, born in August 1964, had graduated from Beihang University in 1986 with a degree in mechanical manufacturing. Later, the company also produced wardrobes, bathroom cabinets, wooden doors, and others in addition to kitchen cabinets. A manufacturing-modernisation programme was announced in 2015, and a second brand, OPPOLIA (欧铂丽), was launched in 2016.

Oppein completed an initial public offering on the Shanghai Stock Exchange on 28 March 2017 under the ticker 603833.

== Products and operations ==
Oppein's brands are OPPEIN (欧派), OPPOLIA, and BAUNIS (铂尼思), and miform. On 10 May 2022, OPPEIN Home Group acquired Former S.r.l., an Italian company which specializes in high-end interior design; the brand miform was created from this acquisition. The company produces kitchen cabinets, wardrobes, bathroom vanities, aluminum windows and doors, wooden doors, custom furniture, and quartz slabs.

Oppein Home Group has large automated plants throughout China, including in Guangzhou, Tianjin, Qingyuan, Wuxi, Chengdu, and Wuhan. The factories use woodworking machinery supplied by the German manufacturer Homag. The company had 7,000 stores at the end of 2025.
