= Inovance =

Chinese automation company

Shenzhen Inovance Technology Co., Ltd
- Trade name: Inovance
- Native name: 深圳市汇川技术股份有限公司
- Company type: Public
- Traded as: SZSE: 300124; CSI A50
- Industry: Electrical equipment
- Founded: April 2003; 23 years ago
- Founder: Zhu Xingming
- Headquarters: Shenzhen, Guangdong, China
- Key people: Zhu Xingming (Chairman & CEO)
- Revenue: ▲CN¥30.42 billion (2023)
- Net income: ▲CN¥4.78 billion (2023)
- Total assets: ▲CN¥48.96 billion (2023)
- Total equity: ▲CN¥25.00 billion (2023)
- Number of employees: 23,685 (2023)
- Website: www.inovance.com

Inovance (Chinese: 汇川技术; pinyin: Huìchuān Jìshù) is a publicly listed Chinese company that engages in the manufacture and sale of electrical equipment that includes industrial automation control products, as well as robotics. In their subsidiary Suzhou Inovance Automotive Co. they produce electrical systems for the automotive industry.

It is currently the largest industrial automation company in China as well as its second largest domestic producer of industrial robots. Founded by a group of former Huawei engineers, the company has been dubbed "Little Huawei" in the industry.

== Background ==
Inovance was founded in April 2003 by Zhu Xingming and several other engineers from Huawei. When the company was founded, it aimed to compete in the high-end market with foreign companies and never to fall into a price war with domestic companies.

On 28 September 2010, Inovance held its initial public offering and became a listed company on the Shenzhen Stock Exchange. Afterwards it expanded its product range from single frequency changers to other industrial control products such as programmable logic controllers and servomechanisms.

Originally servicing the lower end market, the company gradually moved to take market share in the higher end market from European and Japanese incumbents.

According to a report by Deutsche Bank in 2017, Inovance stood to benefit heavily from the Made in China 2025 policy that would increased domestic industrial automation demand. At the time foreign companies still controlled 65% of China's industrial automation market.

In June 2021, Inovance announced it had secured a CNY2.1 billion private placement from twelve investors that included Hillhouse Investment, CITIC Securities, JPMorgan Chase, Morgan Stanley, UBS and AIA Group. The company planned to use the proceeds from it to acquire the remaining 49 percent stake in subsidiary Inovance Control Technology as well as expanding its output of automation control equipment, and developing smart software. Its stock price rose 7.9% after the announcement.

In January 2024, Shenzhen Institute of Information Technology announced it teamed up with Inovance to launch a program to train senior engineers and a technology research institute for robotics.

In April 2024, Zhu stated the company hopes it would be able to challenge larger incumbents such as ABB and Siemens for a place in the top three largest companies in the sector globally within five years. He also stated he believe Chinese automation companies will keep global supply chains running and insulate them from protectionism as they try to expand overseas.

In January 2026, it was reported that Inovance was considering a secondary listing on the Hong Kong Stock Exchange.
