= Shandong Gold Group =

State-owned Chinese gold mining company

- Native name: 山东黄金集团有限公司
- Romanized name: shāndōng huángjīn jítuán yǒuxiàn gōngsī
- Company type: State-owned enterprise
- Traded as: SSE: 600547; CSI A100
- Industry: Mining, Financial services, Real estate
- Founded: 1975
- Headquarters: Jinan, Shandong, China
- Key people: Li Hang (Chairman)
- Products: Gold, Nonferrous metals
- Revenue: ▲CN¥82.52 billion (2024)
- Net income: ▲CN¥2.95 billion (2024)
- Number of employees: 17,439 (2024)
- Website: www.sd-gold.com

Shandong Gold Group is a state-owned Chinese gold mining company under the provincial government of Shandong. The company is the second-largest producer of gold in China by output and its publicly listed subsidiary ranked #1,898 in the Forbes Global 2000.

== Corporate affairs ==
Shandong Gold Group is the parent company of Shandong Gold Mining, which is publicly listed on the Shanghai Stock Exchange. As a state-owned enterprise, it is directly supervised by the State-owned Assets Supervision and Administration Commission (SASAC) of the Shandong Provincial Government.

In September 2018, Shandong Gold formed a strategic partnership with Canadian mining giant Barrick Gold, involving mutual cross-investment of up to $300 million. This followed the acquisition of a 50% stake in Barrick's Veladero mine in Argentina in 2017.

Shandong Gold is a member of the World Gold Council, a global industry body promoting responsible gold mining practices.

=== Shanjin International Gold ===
Shanjin International Gold Co., Ltd. (formerly Yintai Gold Co., Ltd.), a subsidiary of Shandong Gold, focuses on precious metals and non-ferrous metal mining, exploration, and trading. Listed on the Shenzhen Stock Exchange (000975.SZ), Shanjin International operates four domestic gold mines—Heihe Luoke, Jilin Banmiaozhi, Qinghai Dachaidan, and Mangshi Huasheng—as well as Inner Mongolia Yulong, a lead-zinc-silver mine.

In February 2024, Shanjin International announced the acquisition of Osino Resources Corp., a Canadian gold exploration company, for CAD 368 million, marking its first major overseas acquisition.

== Operations ==
Shandong Gold Group is one of China's leading gold producers, with mining and exploration projects across multiple Chinese provinces and a growing international footprint. The group is also involved in the mining of nonferrous metals such as copper and silver through its wholly owned and joint-venture operations.

=== Domestic gold mining ===
Shandong Gold operates 12 active domestic mines in Shandong, Inner Mongolia, Gansu, and Fujian. These mines account for approximately 6.6% of China's total gold production.

Notable operations include:

- The Sanshandao Gold Mine and Xincheng Gold Mine in the Zhaoyuan–Laizhou gold belt of Shandong Province, among the most productive gold deposits in China.
- The Linglong Gold Mine, one of China's oldest continuously producing gold mines.
- A major gold discovery in 2017 in Laizhou-Zhaoyuan, with reserves estimated at over 382 tonnes and a projected value of approximately US$22 billion.

=== International gold mining ===
Shandong Gold has been actively expanding overseas to secure resource supply and globalize its operations.

- Veladero Mine, Argentina: In April 2017, Shandong Gold acquired a 50% interest in the Veladero gold mine in San Juan Province, Argentina, from Barrick Gold for US$960 million. The two companies also formed a joint venture to explore the nearby Pascua-Lama deposit.
- Cardinal Namdini Project, Ghana: In 2021, Shandong Gold acquired Cardinal Resources Ltd. for approximately US$220 million, outbidding Russian miner Nordgold. Cardinal's flagship Namdini Project in northern Ghana is one of the largest undeveloped gold deposits in West Africa, with over 5 million ounces in reserves.
- Tashkent Representative Office, Uzbekistan: In 2024, Shandong Gold established a regional office in Tashkent, Uzbekistan, in partnership with local firm SINOLO LLC. The move supports ongoing evaluation of Central Asian gold projects and enhances the company's presence in the Belt and Road corridor.

=== Attempted acquisitions ===
- In 2020, Shandong Gold entered an agreement to acquire TMAC Resources and its Hope Bay project in Nunavut, Canada, for US$165 million. However, the Canadian government rejected the transaction in December 2020 on national security grounds.

=== Nonferrous and polymetallic mining ===
While gold remains the group's core focus, Shandong Gold also engages in nonferrous metal extraction, including copper, silver, and zinc. Some projects are conducted through joint ventures or subsidiaries, particularly in Inner Mongolia and Fujian. These operations are integrated with the company's refining and trading network to support metal supply chains in China's industrial sector.

=== Non-Gold Businesses ===
In addition to its core gold mining operations, Shandong Gold Group has diversified into sectors including nonferrous metals, real estate, tourism, and financial services.

The group's financial services are managed through entities such as SD Gold Financial Holdings Group in China and SDG Financial Holdings (HK) Limited in Hong Kong. These subsidiaries serve as platforms for investment, mergers and acquisitions, and international financing.
