= China Northern Rare Earth =

Chinese resource company in Inner Mongolia

- Traded as: CSI A100

China Northern Rare Earth (Group) High-tech Co., Ltd. (Chinese: 中国北方稀土（集团）高科技股份有限公司), known as China Northern Rare Earth (Chinese: 北方稀土; pinyin: Běifāng Xītǔ) and abbreviated CNREG, is based in Baotou National Rare Earth High-Tech Industrial Development Zone, Baotou, Inner Mongolia, China. The company's products include rare earth concentrate and highly processed rare earth products.

The company is listed on the Shanghai Stock Exchange. Its CEO is Dianqing Zhao (赵殿清), and its general manager is Yedong Qu (瞿业栋).

In 2018, the company made a profit of 606 million RMB on revenue of 13.85 billion RMB.

== History ==
In 2008, China Northern Rare Earth merged with Baotou Steel Rare Earth, and by 2009 the company's market share reached 90%. In 2010, the company's performance rose dramatically, increasing by a factor of 12.46. In 2014, Baotou Steel Rare Earth established China Northern Rare Earth Group, one of the largest rare earth corporations in China.
