= Tongwei Company =

Chinese energy and agricultural company

Tongwei Co., Ltd.
- Native name: 通威股份有限公司
- Company type: Public
- Traded as: SSE: 600438; CSI A100
- Industry: Energy; Agricultural
- Founded: 1992; 34 years ago
- Founders: Liu Hanyuan
- Headquarters: Chengdu, Sichuan, China
- Key people: Liu Shuqi (Chairman & CEO)
- Revenue: ▼CN¥139.10 billion (2023)
- Net income: ▼CN¥18.25 billion (2023)
- Total assets: ▲CN¥164.36 billion (2023)
- Total equity: ▲CN¥73.83 billion (2023)
- Number of employees: 56,406 (2023)
- Website: en.tongwei.com.cn

Tongwei Company (Tongwei; Chinese: 通威股份有限公司; pinyin: Tōngwēi Gǔfèn Yǒuxiàn Gōngsī) is a publicly listed Chinese energy and agricultural company headquartered in Chengdu.

The company is engaged in photovoltaics (PV) manufacturing as well as in the agriculture and animal husbandry business of selling livestock feed. It is the largest producer of high-purity polysilicon and solar cells in the world.

== Background ==
In 1992, Liu Hanyuan founded the company originally as Tongwei Feed Co., Ltd, an aquatic feed company. His success in the field rewarded him with political appointments where he became a member of the China Democratic National Construction Association and the Chinese People's Political Consultative Conference.

On 16 February 2004, Tongwei held its initial public offering becoming a listed company on the Shanghai Stock Exchange.

Although the company achieved success in the feed business, the profit margins shrank as competition increased and forced the company to increase its scale to stay competitive.

Liu saw the opportunities when the Chinese government was cracking down on pollution and was looking into clean energy. In 2006, Tongwei entered into the PV industry and in 2007 acquired a factory producing polyvinyl chloride, a raw material for polysilicon production. It encountered a lot of challenges during its early period into the industry as it had little experience and also was in a difficult economy due to the 2008 financial crisis. In addition at the time most Chinese PV companies were not competitive in the global market and relied on government subsidiaries.

Tongwei was a latecomer to the PV industry in China. Rather than compete directly with its leaders, Tongwei pursued a unique "aquatic fishing plus PV energy which combined its agriculture business with its energy business. PV power stations were placed over aquaculture ponds to generate electricity while farmers harvested at lower costs with higher efficiency. The model could be applied to China's rural areas which were seen as helping the government achieve its goal of Targeted Poverty Alleviation.

In 2013, Tongwei acquired LDK Solar Hi-Tech (Hefei) Co, a solar cell and module manufacturing unit from LDK Solar Co. The acquisition meant Tongwei could now manufacture solar cells and modules using its own polysilicon.

In 2019, Liu stepped down as Chairman of Tongwei although he still maintains significant control of the company. He was succeeded by his daughter, Liu Shuqi.

In August 2020, Tongwei's polysilicon-focused subsidiary, Yongxiang Co was forced to close its 20,000 tonne plant in Leshan due to a flood warning. This accounted for one quarter of Tongwei's annual polysilicon production capacity.

In June 2023, Maxeon Solar Technologies filed a patent infringement lawsuit against Tongwei concerning its shingled solar cell panel technology.

In August 2023, Tongwei made its debut on the Fortune Global 500 list where it was ranked 476th.

In December 2023, Tongwei stated it planned to invest $3.9 billion into a massive factory based in Ordos City in Inner Mongolia. The expansion plan came as the industry saw price wars and decreasing profitability.

== See also ==
- Solar power in China
- Photovoltaics
- Polycrystalline silicon
