= Qinghai Salt Lake Potash =

Chinese chemical production company

Qinghai Salt Lake Potash Company Limited 青海鹽湖鉀肥股份有限公司
- Type: public
- Traded as: SZSE: 000792
- Industry: Chemical fertilizer
- Founded: 1997
- Headquarters: Golmud, Qinghai, China
- Area served: People's Republic of China
- Key people: Chairman: Mr. Zheng Changshan
- Products: potash, potassium chloride, lithium carbonate
- Parent: Qinghai Salt Lake Industry Group
- Website: Qinghai Salt Lake Potash Company Limited

Qinghai Salt Lake Potash Company Limited is the largest potash production base in China. It owns a 120-square-kilometer salt lake in Golmud, Qinghai. The company was established and listed on the Shenzhen Stock Exchange in 1997. It specializes in the manufacture and sale of potassium chloride which are distributed under the brand name of "Yanqiao". It is owned by Qinghai Salt Lake Industry Group and Sinochem Corporation.
