= Anhui Conch Cement =

Chinese cement manufacturer

- Type: Public
- Traded as: SSE: 600585 (A share); SEHK: 914 (H share); CSI A50
- Industry: Cement production and sales
- Founded: 1997
- Headquarters: Wuhu, Anhui, China
- Area served: People's Republic of China
- Key people: Chairman: Mr. Guo Wensan
- Owner: Conch Holdings (36.78%); Conch Venture Investment (5.41%); China Securities Finance (3.15%); Central Huijin (1.33%); National Social Security Fund (1.02%)
- Website: conch.cn

Anhui Conch Cement Co., Ltd.
- Chinese: 安徽海螺水泥股份有限公司
- Literal meaning: Anhui Conch Cement Joint-Stock Limited Company
Transcriptions

Anhui Conch Cement
- Chinese: 安徽海螺水泥
Transcriptions

Anhui Conch Cement Co., Ltd. known also as Anhui Conch or Conch Cement, is the largest cement Manufacturing Company seller in the mainland China, headquartered in Anhui Province. Its business scope covers the manufacture and sales of cement and clinker.

Its H-share was listed in the Hong Kong Stock Exchange on October 21, 1997, while its A-share was listed in the Shanghai Stock Exchange on February 7, 2002.

== Shareholders ==
The largest shareholder of Conch Cement was Anhui Conch Holdings (Chinese: 安徽海螺集团有限责任公司), which was owned by the Anhui Provincial People's Government via wholly owned subsidiary Anhui Provincial Investment Group Holdings Co., Ltd. (Chinese: 安徽省投资集团控股有限公司) and subsidiary China Conch Venture Holdings (SEHK: 586, Chinese: 中国海螺创业控股有限公司). The second largest shareholder, Conch Venture Investment (Chinese: 安徽海螺创业投资有限责任公司) is owned by trade unions and other private shareholders.
