= Foxconn Industrial Internet =

Chinese electrical equipment company

Foxconn Industrial Internet Co., Ltd.
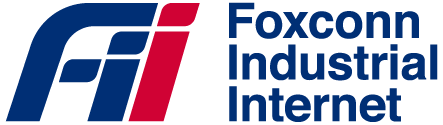
- Native name: 富士康工业互联网股份有限公司
- Company type: Public subsidiary
- Traded as: SSE: 601138
- Industry: Electrical equipment
- Founded: 6 March 2015; 11 years ago
- Headquarters: Shenzhen, Guangdong, China
- Key people: Brand Cheng (chairman & CEO)
- Revenue: ▲CN¥902.887 billion (2025)
- Net income: ▲CN¥35.286 billion (2025)
- Total assets: ▲CN¥287.71 billion (2023)
- Total equity: ▲CN¥140.60 billion (2023)
- Number of employees: 191,521 (2023)
- Parent: Foxconn
- Website: www.fii-foxconn.com

Foxconn Industrial Internet Co., Ltd. (Fii; Chinese: 富士康工业互联网; pinyin: Fùshìkāng Gōngyè Hùliánwǎng) is a publicly listed company that engages in the manufacture and sale of electrical equipment that includes telecommunications equipment, cloud computing equipment, precision tools and industrial robots.

It is a subsidiary of Foxconn and is headquartered in Shenzhen.

== Background ==
Fii was founded in 2015 in Shenzhen. It was originally a wholly owned subsidiary of Foxconn that was set up as a strategic investment platform uninvolved in actual business operations.

In 2017, Fii was restructured to become a joint stock limited company.

On 8 June 2018, Fii held its initial public offering (IPO) becoming a publicly listed company on the Shanghai Stock Exchange. It was the second company in China to be fast-tracked for its listing process. At the time it was the largest IPO in China since 2015 and raised 27.1 billion yuan. On its trading debut, Fii shares rose 44% making it valuable tech company listed in mainland China at the time.

It was reported that Terry Gou wanted to expand Foxconn's business beyond contract manufacturing and through Fii, increase its focus on automation and smart manufacturing technology. Fii's own prospectus revealed net margins that were over 50 percent higher than its parent's.

In December 2022, the Taiwan Government fined Foxconn NT$10 million for investing in Tsinghua Unigroup without seeking regulatory approval and was in violation of the Cross-Strait Act. The investment which was executed in July that year was done through Fii. As a result, Foxconn stated it would sell out its holdings in Tsinghua Unigroup.

In July 2023, it was reported that Fii would sign an agreement with the Government of Tamil Nadu to invest Rs 16 billion to build a campus in Kancheepuram that would create 6,000 jobs. However Fii later on stated it had not signed any agreement.

In August 2023, according to a report, Fii would exclusively supply Apple with Vietnam-made servers for training and testing artificial intelligence services. The report also stated it had supplied servers to Amazon Web Services, OpenAI and Nvidia.

In October 2023, Chinese authorities stated Foxconn and its subsidiaries would be under investigation to see if they were abiding with laws and regulations. Fii shares dropped 10% as a result. In November 2023, Chinese tax authorities fined Fii 20,000 yuan for overstating expenses.

In fiscal year 2024, Fii achieved record revenue of 609.14 billion yuan (over $80 billion), representing a 27.88 percent increase from the previous year. This growth was primarily driven by rising demand for cloud and AI servers. In March 2025, Reuters reported that, according to its chairman Young Liu, Foxconn expected server revenue to surpass iPhone revenue within two years. Foxconn manufactures a significant portion of Nvidia’s latest AI servers, including systems based on the GB200 and GB300 platforms.

In 2025, the cloud computing business accounted for over 66 percent of total revenue, while revenue from AI servers was more than three times higher than in the previous year.
