= Oriental Yuhong =

Chinese waterproof system company (e. 1998)

Beijing Oriental Yuhong Waterproof Technology Co., Ltd.
- Native name: 北京东方雨虹防水技术股份有限公司
- Company type: Public (since 2008)
- Traded as: SZSE: 002271
- Industry: building waterproof
- Founded: 1998; 28 years ago
- Key people: Li Weiguo (Chairman and CEO)
- Products: paint material waterproof materials

short name
- Simplified Chinese: 东方雨虹
- Traditional Chinese: 東方雨虹
- Hanyu Pinyin: Dōngfāng Yǔhóng
- Literal meaning: Oriental Yuhong
Transcriptions
Standard Mandarin
- Hanyu Pinyin: Dōngfāng Yǔhóng
- Website: en.yuhong.com.cn

Beijing Oriental Yuhong Waterproof Technology Co., Ltd. (SZSE: 002271), commonly abbreviated as Oriental Yuhong, is a waterproof system service provider, founded in 1995. It prevailingly produces water-based waterproof coatings for applications. After being approved by the China Securities Regulatory Commission for IPO, it officially went public on the Shenzhen Stock Exchange on September 10, 2008.

== History ==
In August 2024, Oriental Yuhong's new factory and logistics center in the US, the Prairie View factory was breaking ground in Prairie View.

In August 2024, TOA Group and Oriental Yuhong signed a strategic MOU.

In June 2013, Oriental Yuhong landed in Trinidad and Tobago through establishing a manufacturing plant with Lake Asphalt.

In January 2016, Oriental Yuhong landed at incubator of Ben Franklin TechVentures in Pennsylvania, United States.

In July 2017, it jointly established Zhongguancun Bank, a private bank granted by the China Banking Regulatory Commission.
