= Nari Technology =

Chinese automation company

NARI Technology Co., Ltd
- Trade name: NARI-TECH
- Native name: 国电南瑞科技股份有限公司
- Formerly: NARI Technology Development
- Company type: Public; State-owned enterprise
- Traded as: SSE: 600406; CSI A50
- Industry: Electrical equipment
- Founded: 28 February 2001; 25 years ago
- Headquarters: Nanjing, Jiangsu, China
- Key people: Shan Shewu (Chairman); Zhang jianming (President)
- Revenue: ▲CN¥51.57 billion (2023)
- Net income: ▲CN¥7.65 billion (2023)
- Total assets: ▲CN¥86.09 billion (2023)
- Total equity: ▲CN¥50.38 billion (2023)
- Owner: NARI Group (51%)
- Number of employees: 11,016 (2023)
- Website: www.naritech.cn

NARI Technology Co., Ltd (Nari; Chinese: 国电南瑞; pinyin: Guódiàn Nánruì) is a partially state-owned publicly listed Chinese company that engages in the manufacture and sale of electrical equipment that includes industrial automation control products.

It is majority owned by the Nari Group which is directly under the State Grid Corporation of China.

== Background ==
In 1973, the Nanjing Automation Research Institute (Nari Group) was established under the State Grid Corporation of China.

In February 2001, Nari Technology was established as a separate unit under the Nari Group.

On 16 October 2003, Nari held its initial public offering becoming a listed company on the Shanghai Stock Exchange.

In April 2023, Britain's National Grid terminated its contract with Nari's subsidiary, NR Electric and in December 2023, started removing components supplied by it for electric power transmission networks. While no reason was given, it was speculated it was due to cybersecurity concerns after advice was given by the National Cyber Security Centre. NR Electric had worked with National Grid since 2019 and stated the decision would cause "a material loss of income for the business."

== Business overview ==
Nari is a supplier of power and automation technologies in China.

Nari's main business involves the manufacturing of high-power insulated-gate bipolar junction transistors. It initially had to rely on third-party companies for outsourcing all testing in its research and development processes. However it was able to develop its own in-house testing process after implementing Simcenter Micred, a quality tester produced by Siemens.
