= Shaanxi Coal and Chemical Industry =

Coal company based in Xi'an, China

Shaanxi Coal and Chemical Industry Group Co., Ltd.
- Company type: State owned
- Industry: Coal mining
- Founded: 2004
- Headquarters: Xi'an, China
- Key people: Hua Wei (former Chairman); Yang Zhaoqian (Chairman)
- Products: Coal
- Revenue: US$ 74.777 billion (2023)
- Net income: US$ 1.114 billion (2023)
- Total assets: US$ 100.9 billion (2023)
- Number of employees: 140,142 (2023)
- Website: www.shxcoal.com

Shaanxi Coal and Chemical Industry Group Co., Ltd. (former name: Shaanxi Coal Industry Group) is a coal company based in Xi'an, China. As of 2011, it was the third largest coal company in China. As of 2012, the Group owns or has shares in nearly 60 enterprises with total of 136,000 employees. Its main subsidiary is Shaanxi Coal Industry (SSE: 601225).

In 2011, it ranked 158th among China top 500 enterprises and 35th among Chinese top 200 most efficient enterprises and first among Shaanxi's most efficient enterprises. In the 2020 Forbes Global 2000, Shaanxi Coal Industry, a subsidiary of Shaanxi Coal Chemical Industry, was ranked as the 805th -largest public company in the world.

In addition to operations in China, the group has invested in a fertilizer plant in Argentina and plans to invest in a coal mine in Australia.

In 2024, Shaanxi Coal and Chemical Industry Group was responsible for 624 Mt of CO_{2} emissions, which was 1.62% of global CO_{2} emissions.
