= China Shenhua Energy =

Chinese mining and energy company

- Native name: 中国神华能源股份有限公司
- Romanized name: Zhōngguó shénhuá néngyuán gǔfèn yǒuxiàn gōngsī
- Type: Public
- Traded as: SSE: 601088; SEHK: 1088; CSI A50
- Industry: Electricity; Mining
- Founded: 1995
- Headquarters: Beijing, China
- Area served: China
- Key people: Zhang Yuzuo (chairman)
- Products: Coal; Electric power
- Number of employees: 74,949 (2011)
- Parent: Shenhua Group (73.06%)
- Website: www.csec.com

China Shenhua Energy Company Limited, also known as Shenhua, China Shenhua, or Shenhua Energy (Chinese: 神华能源; pinyin: Shénhuá Néngyuán), is the largest state-owned coal mining enterprise in mainland China, and in the world. It is a subsidiary of Shenhua Group. It mines, refines, and sells coal, and generates and sells electric power in the People's Republic of China. It operates coal mines as well as an integrated railway network and a seaport that are primarily used to transport its coal. It also operates power plants in the PRC which are engaged in the generation and sales of coal-based power to provincial and regional electric companies. In the 2020 Forbes Global 2000, China Shenhua Energy was ranked as the 168th -largest public company in the world.

== History ==
On August 15, 2005, China Shenhua Energy became a constituent of Hang Seng China Enterprises Index.

On August 23, 2007, China Shenhua Energy announced that it will issue not more than 1.8 billion A-share to provide rooms for its parent company, China Shenhua Group, to inject the capital into it for its long-term development.

On October 9, 2007, China Shenhua Energy listed A share in the Shanghai Stock Exchange. The closed price at the first trading day was RMB69.3, 87% higher than its IPO price, RMB 36.99.

On November 7, 2007, Hang Seng Index Services Company announced that China Shenhua would have been Hang Seng Index Constituent Stock since December 10, 2007.

In September 2009, Shenhua announced that over four years they will invest US$39.5 billion in coal to increase their production.

In September 2010, the company agreed to an extensive cooperation contract with Mitsui & Co., encompassing shipping, overseas mine development, coal usage and chemical manufacturing.

In December 2010, Shenhua invested $2 billion in the construction of a railway; financing 35% with its own capital.

In July 2011, Shenhua acquired a 40% stake in Mongolia's biggest coal project, with a Russian syndicate controlling 36% and Peabody Energy owning the remaining 24%.

== See also ==
- Coal power in China
