= Banking in China =

Government managed banking system

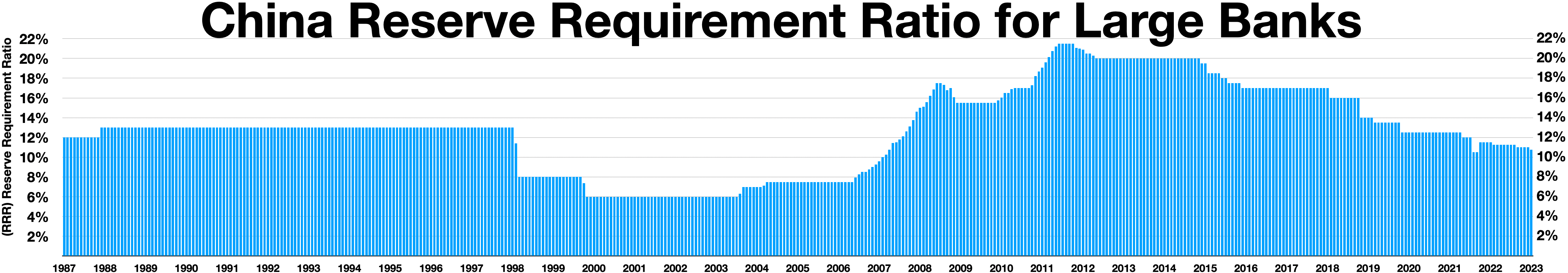
China's Reserve Requirement Ratio for large banks

China's banking sector had CN¥417 trillion (US$58.54 trillion) in assets at the end of 2023. The "Big Four" state-owned commercial banks are the Bank of China, the China Construction Bank, the Industrial and Commercial Bank of China, and the Agricultural Bank of China, all of which are among the largest banks in the world as of 2018. Other notable big and also the largest banks in the world are China Merchants Bank and Ping An Bank.

== History ==
The history of banking in China includes the business of dealing with money and credit transactions in China.

== Supervisory bodies ==
The People's Bank of China (PBOC) is China's central bank, which formulates and implements monetary policy. The PBOC maintains the banking sector's payment, clearing and settlement systems, and manages official foreign exchange and gold reserves. It oversees the State Administration of Foreign Exchange (SAFE) for setting foreign-exchange policies.

According to the 1995 Central Bank law, PBOC has full autonomy in applying the monetary instruments, including setting interest rate for commercial banks and trading in government bonds. The State Council maintains oversight of PBOC policies. The PBC does not have central bank independence and is politically required to implement the policies of the Chinese Communist Party (CCP).

China Banking Regulatory Commission (CBRC) was officially launched on April 28, 2003, to take over the supervisory role of the PBOC. The goal of the landmark reform is to improve the efficiency of bank supervision and to help the PBOC to further focus on the macroeconomy and monetary policy. Most of the functions of the Central Financial Work Commission, which had been created in 1998 as the implementing body for Communist Party financial policies, coordinating regulatory agencies in the financial sector, conducting investigations and disciplinary inspections, and making personnel recommendations, were transferred to the CBRC.

According to the official Announcement by CBRC posted on its website, the CBRC is responsible for "the regulation and supervision of banks, asset management companies, trust and investment companies as well as other deposit-taking financial institutions. Its mission is to maintain a safe and sound banking system in China."

== Domestic key players ==
=== Policy banks ===
Three new policy banks, the Agricultural Development Bank of China (ADBC), China Development Bank (CDB), and the Export-Import Bank of China (Chexim), were established in 1994 to take over the government-directed spending functions of the four state-owned commercial banks. These banks are responsible for financing economic and trade development and state-invested projects.

ADBC provides funds for agricultural development projects in rural areas; the CDB specializes in infrastructure financing, and Chexim specializes in trade financing.

Policy banks have a major role in financing Belt and Road Initiative Projects.

=== State-owned Commercial Banks ===
In 1995, the Chinese Government introduced the Commercial Bank Law to commercialize the operations of the four state-owned banks, the Bank of China (BOC), the China Construction Bank (CCB), the Agricultural Bank of China (ABC), and the Industrial and Commercial Bank of China (ICBC).

- The Industrial & Commercial Bank of China (ICBC) is the largest bank in China by total assets, total employees and total customers. ICBC differentiates itself from the other State Owned Commercial Banks by being second in foreign exchange business and 1st in RMB clearing business. It used to be the major supplier of funds to China's urban areas and manufacturing sector.
- The Bank of China (BOC) specializes in foreign-exchange transactions and trade finance. In 2002, BOC Hong Kong (Holdings) was successfully listed on the Hong Kong Stock Exchange. The USD2.8 billion offering was over-subscribed by 7.5 times. The deal was a significant move in the reform of China's banking industry.
- The China Construction Bank (CCB) specializes in medium to long-term credit for long term specialized projects, such as infrastructure projects and urban housing development.
- The Agriculture Bank of China (ABC) specializes in providing financing to China's agricultural sector and offers wholesale and retail banking services to farmers, township and village enterprises (TVEs) and other rural institutions.
- Bank of Communications (BOCOM) is the only State-owned Commercial Banks headquartered in Shanghai, the rest are all in Beijing.

=== Commercial Banks ===
China has 12 national commercial banks, including:

- China Merchants Bank specializes in providing Personal Banking Business and Corporate & Investment Banking Business.
- Ping An Bank specializes in providing services in retail and corporate banking, including investment banking services.

=== City commercial banks ===
The third significant group in Chinese banking market is the city commercial banks or urban commercial banks. Many of them were founded on the basis of urban credit cooperatives. The first one was Shenzhen City Commercial Bank in 1995. In 1998, PBOC announced that all urban cooperative banks change their name to city commercial bank. And there are 69 city commercial banks set up from 1995 to 1998. In 2005 there were 112 city commercial banks in all of China. This number has increased through additional transformations to 140 in 2009. Most city commercial banks have strong ties to their local government and are majority or wholly state owned. Since 2005 some city commercial banks diversify their shareholders, inviting Chinese and international private companies to take minority shares, merging and cross-shareholding. Some of the banks have listed their shares. While the market for city commercial banks is oriented towards supporting the regional economy, it also finances local infrastructure and other government projects. Since 2008, a strong trend has emerged for city commercial banks to extend business beyond their home region. They are also often the main shareholder behind village and township banks (VTB). Some have founded so-called small loans units to serve smaller business clients better.

Notable examples for city commercial banks include:

- Bank of Beijing
- Bank of Hangzhou
- Bank of Ningbo
- Bank of Tianjin
- Bank of Weifang
- Taizhou City Commercial Bank

=== Rural Commercial Banks ===
Rural commercial banks in China are primarily focused on serving local agricultural and rural economies including small businesses and rural households.

=== Trust and investment corporations ===
In the midst of the reforms of the 1990s, the government established some new investment banks that engaged in various forms of merchant and investment banking activities. However, many of the 240 or so international trust and investment corporations (ITICs) established by government agencies and provincial authorities experienced severe liquidity problems after the bankruptcy of the Guangdong International Trust and Investment Corporation (GITIC) in late 1998. The largest surviving ITIC is China International Trust and Investment Corporation (CITIC), which has a banking subsidiary known as China CITIC Bank.

=== County banks ===
A County Bank, as known as Rural Commercial Banks, is a kind of financial institution with the purpose of boosting rural economic development, which has developed in China since 2005.

=== Foreign sponsored state banks ===
Due to massive debt problems facing the Chinese economy, the People's Bank of China (PBC) introduced the Foreign Country Sponsored State Banks in late 2016. This type of financial institution is formed when a bank from a different country is allowed to set up retail commercial operations in a joint venture with the PBC. The idea is that foreign players with a large appetite for risk will be incentivized to start operations in China, and the PBC will retain supervision of the bank and possibly remove leverage from the Chinese banking system. Central banks from Egypt and Switzerland are the first banks to be approved for operations, and they will begin those operations as soon as February 2017.

== Reforms in the banking industry ==
As part of the State Council's 1993 Resolution on Financial System Reform and its effort to modernize the financial sector, the People's Bank of China was assigned the role of managing the currency and preserving macroeconomic and financial stability.

China issued its Commercial Bank Law in 1995. It allowed state-owned banks to be commercialized. The Commercial Bank Law stated that state-owned banks should operate on principles of efficiency and safety, take responsibility for profits and losses, and lend with a focus on "the need for the development of the national economy and social progress and under the guidance of state industrial policy."

Years of government-directed lending has presented Chinese banks with large amounts of non-performing loans. According to the Central Bank's report, non-performing loans account for 21.4% to 26.1% of total lending of China's four big banks in 2002. In 1999, four asset management companies (AMC) were established to transfer the non-performing assets from the banks. The AMCs plan to repackage the non-performing loans into viable assets and sell them off to the investors.

PBOC has encouraged banks to diversify their portfolios by increasing their services to the private sector and individual consumers. In July 2000, a personal credit rating system was launched in Shanghai to be used to assess consumer credit risk and set ratings standards. This is an important move in developing China's consumer credit industry, and increase bank loans to individuals.

The central government has allowed several small banks to raise capital through bonds or stock issues. Followed the listing of Shenzhen Development Bank and Pudong Development Bank, China Minsheng Bank, then the only private bank in China, was listed on the Shanghai Stock Exchange (A-Share) in December 2000. More Chinese banks are expected to list in the next two years in order to raise capital.

The reform of the banking system has been accompanied by PBOC's decision to decontrol interest rates. Market-based interest rate reform is intended to establish the pricing mechanism of the deposit and lending rates based on market supply and demand. The central bank would continue to adjust and guide the interest rate development, which allows the market mechanism to play a dominant role in financial resource allocation.

The sequence of the reform is to liberalize the interest rate of foreign currency before that of domestic currency, lending before deposit, large amount and long term before small amount and short term. As a first step, the PBOC liberalized the interest rates for foreign currency loans and large deposits (US$3 million and over) in September 2000. Rate for deposits below US$3 million remain subject to PBOC control. In March 2002, the PBOC unified foreign currency interest rate policies for Chinese and foreign financial institutions in China. Small foreign exchange deposits of Chinese residents with foreign banks in China were included in the PBOC interest rate administration of small foreign exchange deposits, so that domestic and foreign financial institutions are treated fairly with regard to the interest rate policy of foreign exchange deposits.

As interest rate liberalization progressed, the PPOC liberalized, simplified, or abandoned 114 categories of interest rates initially under control since 1996. At present, 34 categories of interest rates remain subject to PBOC control. The full liberalization of interest rates on other deposit accounts, including checking and saving accounts, is expected to take much longer. On the lending side, market-determined interest rates on loans will first be introduced in rural areas and then followed by rate liberalization in cities.

=== Deposit insurance ===
According to a confidential informant privy to the agenda at the closed meeting, creating a system of deposit insurance was expected to be discussed at the annual Central Economic Work Conference in December, 2012; studying deposit insurance was included in the 5 year plan for 2011–2015. The government's practice, in the absence of formal provisions for deposit insurance or bank failure, has been to reimburse all depositors, large or small, at small banks and rural cooperatives which fail; this is done to avoid the social unrest which might accompany a bank run. Large banks which might have failed without government support have been propped up. Introduction of deposit insurance is part of a projected general reform of the banking system which would wean banks from their close relationship to state-owned enterprises; banks strongly prefer to lend to state-owned enterprises because payment is seen to be guaranteed. Loans to private firms and individuals are seen as risky; consequently, the private sector is starved for credit.

If deposit insurance premiums were based on volume of deposits China's Big Four banks, which would not be permitted to fail in any event, would pay hefty premiums, thus subsidizing smaller banks. If adopted, it is anticipated that drafting of regulations and introduction of a system of deposit insurance would take at least a year. In order to attract depositors some banks in China have introduced deposit accounts which use deposited funds to make riskier loans and offer higher interest. Introduction of a scheme of deposit insurance which guarantees only standard low-interest accounts might serve to clarify the situation, explicitly excluding such trust funds from deposit guarantees.

== Credit and Debit cards ==
By the end of the first quarter of 2009, about 1,888,374,100 (1.89 billion) bank cards had been issued in China. Of these cards, 1,737,901,000 (1.74 billion) or 92% were debit cards, while the rest (150,473,100, or 150.5 million) were credit cards. In 2010 China had over 2.4 billion bankcards in circulation growing approximately 16% from the end of 2009. At the end of 2008, China had approximately 1.84 million POS machines and 167,500 ATMs. About 1.18 million merchants in China accept banking cards.

At the end of 2008, there were 196 issuers in China that issue China UnionPay-branded cards. These issuers include the ‘big four’ banks (Industrial and Commercial Bank of China, the Bank of China, China Construction Bank, and the Agricultural Bank of China), as well as fast-growing second tier banks and city commercial banks like China Merchants Bank and Ping An Bank, and even some foreign banks with local operations.

Most of China's state-owned commercial banks now issue dual-currency cards, allowing cardholders to purchase goods within China in RMB and overseas in US dollars (Visa/Mastercard/AmEx/JCB), euros (Visa/Mastercard), Australian dollars (MasterCard), or Japanese yen (JCB). However, only Bank of China provides yen and Australian dollar-denominated credit cards.

According to a 2003 research study by Visa, the average per-transaction purchase with a card was US$253. Consumers used their credit cards mainly to purchase houses, vehicles, and home appliances, as well as to pay utility bills.

One major issue is the lack of a national credit bureau to provide credit information for banks to evaluate individual loan applicants. In 2002, the Shanghai Information Office and the People's Bank of China Shanghai branch established the first personal credit data organization involving 15 commercial banks. The Chinese Government, aiming to promote a nationwide credit system, has also set up a credit system research group. At present, large cities, such as Beijing, Guangzhou, Shenzhen, Chongqing, and Chengdu, are calling for a reliable credit data system. The PBOC is currently evaluating the feasibility of establishing a nationwide credit bureau.

Other obstacles include lack of merchant acceptance and a weak infrastructure for card processing. At present, only 2% of merchants in China are equipped to handle card transactions, although in some major cities like Shanghai the percentage is over 30%. China UnionPay was established to set up a national processing network connecting merchants and banks. China UnionPay has set up bankcard network service centers in 18 cities in addition to a national bankcard information switch center.

Products and services in the credit card system that the Chinese government wants to develop are credit card-related hardware, including POS and ATMs, credit card-related software for banks and merchants; and Credit and risk management training programs.

== Foreign banks ==
China's entry into the WTO is expected to create opportunities for foreign banks. As a milestone move to honor its WTO commitments, China released the Rules for Implementing the Regulations Governing Foreign Financial Institutions in the People's Republic of China in January 2002. The rules provide detailed regulations for implementing the administration of the establishment, registration, scope of business, qualification, supervision, dissolution and liquidation of foreign financial institutions. They also stipulate that foreign bank branches conducting full aspects of foreign-currency business and full aspects of RMB business to all categories of clients are required to have operating capital of at least 600 million RMB (US$72.3 million), of which at least 400 million RMB (US$48.2 million) must be held in RMB and at least 200 million RMB (US$24.1 million) in freely convertible currency.

Client restriction on foreign currency business was lifted immediately after China's entry into the WTO on December 11, 2001. Since then, foreign financial institutions have been permitted to provide foreign currency services to Chinese enterprises and individuals, and have been permitted to provide local currency business to all Chinese clients by the end of 2006. In 2007 five non-mainland banks were allowed to issue bank cards in China, with Bank of East Asia also allowed to issue UnionPay credit cards in the mainland (United Overseas Bank and Sumitomo Mitsui Financial Group have only issued cards in their home countries; they are not yet allowed to issue cards within the mainland). In May 2009 Woori Bank became the first Korean bank allowed to issue UnionPay debit cards (it issues UnionPay credit cards in Korea only).

Furthermore, when China entered the WTO, geographic restrictions placed on RMB-denominated business was phased out in four major cities—Shanghai, Shenzhen, Tianjin and Dalian. Then, on December 1, 2002, foreign-funded banks were allowed to commence RMB-denominated business in Guangzhou, Zhuhai, Qingdao, Nanjing and Wuhan.

== Digital and Mobile Banking ==
In 1994, China started the "Golden Card Project," enabling cards issued by banks to be used all over the country through a network. The establishment of the China Association of Banks rapidly promoted the inter-bank card network and by the end of 2004, the inter-region-inter-bank network had reached 600 cities, including all prefecture-level cities and more than 300 economically developed county-level cities.

Regulatory oversight has also tightened to manage financial risks associated with fintech. In 2023, China undertook a major overhaul of its financial regulatory system, establishing the National Financial Regulatory Administration (NFRA) to replace the China Banking and Insurance Regulatory Commission (CBIRC), unifying supervision over the financial sector (excluding securities).

== See also ==
- History of banking in China
- List of banks in China
- China Securities Journal
