= List of banks in China =

This is a list of banks in China, including mainland China, Hong Kong and Macau.

The central bank of the People's Republic of China is the People's Bank of China, a component of the State Council, the Central Government of China. The People's Bank of China is mainly responsible for issuing the Renminbi and administering its circulation, in addition to formulating and implementing monetary policy in accordance with Chinese law. Its counterparts in the special administrative regions of Hong Kong and Macau are the Hong Kong Monetary Authority and the Monetary Authority of Macao respectively, both of which serve as their respective locale's currency board and de facto central bank.

== Banks in Mainland China ==
All banks, save the People's Bank of China, are under the supervision of China Banking and Insurance Regulatory Commission.

=== Policy banks ===
China has three policy banks. Among them, China Development Bank was incorporated in December 2008 and officially defined by the State Council as a development finance institution in March 2015.

Name (English)	Name (Chinese)	Headquarters
Agricultural Development Bank of China	中国农业发展银行	Beijing
China Development Bank	国家开发银行	Beijing
Exim Bank of China	中国进出口银行	Beijing

=== State-owned Commercial Banks ===
China has six state-owned commercial banks. These banks are ranked by their Tier 1 capital amount as of 2018. Banks with asterisks (*) are the four major state-owned banks (i.e. the "Big Four" banks).

Bank of Communications was founded in 1908. On 1 April 1987, it was restructured and re-commenced operations as the first state-owned bank in China.

Postal Savings Bank of China has the most outlets of any retail bank in China (~40,000). Over 80% of its outlets accompany China Post post offices.

Name (English)	Abbreviation	Name (Chinese)	Abbr. in Chinese	Headquarters
Industrial and Commercial Bank of China*	ICBC	中国工商银行	工行	Beijing
China Construction Bank*	CCB	中国建设银行	建行	Beijing
Bank of China*	BOC	中国银行	中行	Beijing
Agricultural Bank of China*	ABC	中国农业银行	农行	Beijing
Bank of Communications	BOCOM	交通银行	交行	Shanghai
Postal Savings Bank of China	PSBC	中国邮政储蓄银行	邮储银行	Beijing

=== Commercial banks ===
China has 12 national commercial banks. These banks are ordered by their Tier 1 capital amount as of 2018.

Name (English)	Name (Chinese)	Headquarters
China Merchants Bank	招商银行	Shenzhen
Shanghai Pudong Development Bank	上海浦东发展银行	Shanghai
Industrial Bank	兴业银行	Fuzhou
China CITIC Bank	中信银行	Beijing
China Minsheng Bank	中国民生银行	Beijing
China Everbright Bank	中国光大银行	Beijing
Ping An Bank	平安银行	Shenzhen
Huaxia Bank	华夏银行	Beijing
China Guangfa Bank	广发银行	Guangzhou
China Zheshang Bank	浙商银行	Hangzhou
China Bohai Bank	渤海银行	Tianjin
Hengfeng Bank / Evergrowing Bank	恒丰银行	Yantai

=== Urban commercial banks ===
Urban commercial banks were transferred from urban credit cooperatives established in 1980s and 1990s. As of mid-2023, there were approximately 125 city commercial banks (urban commercial banks) operating in China. These institutions are distinct from the six large state-owned commercial banks and 12 joint-stock commercial banks, functioning as local, city-level, or regional financial entities that have been consolidating in recent years.

Name (English)	Name (Chinese)	Headquarters
Bank of Beijing	北京银行	Beijing
Bank of Hangzhou	杭州银行	Hangzhou
Bank of Jiangsu	江苏银行	Jiangsu
Bank of Ningbo	宁波银行	Ningbo
Bank of Shanghai	上海银行	Shanghai
Bank of Tianjin	天津银行	Tianjin
Bank of Weifang	潍坊银行	Weifang
Harbin Bank	哈尔滨银行	Harbin
Huishang Bank	徽商银行	Hefei
Shengjing Bank	盛京银行	Shenyang
Xiamen International Bank	厦门国际银行	Xiamen

=== Rural Commercial Banks ===
Rural commercial banks were converted from rural credit cooperatives and play an important role in rural financial needs. Some rural commercial banks include Beijing Rural Commercial Bank, Shanghai Rural Commercial Bank, Chongqing Rural Commercial Bank, Jiangsu Jingjiang Rural Commercial Bank.

=== Internet Banks and other private banks ===
- WeBank (China) (Shenzhen) – The first private bank and Internet bank in China, initiated by Tencent.
- MYbank (Hangzhou) (Note: Ownership is through a Variable Interest Entity (V.I.E.) structure, which was created in 2000, to circumvent Chinese restrictions on investment in certain industries. Buyers were actually purchasing shares in a Cayman Islands shell corporation, not in the Alibaba group, as China forbids foreign ownership of its companies. Direct investment in MYbank or Ant Financial is not possible as of June 2017. A future IPO offering for Ant Financial Services Group, which owns the subsidiary MYbank, is expected in both the domestic Chinese stock exchange and overseas exchanges.) – Internet bank in China, established by Ant Financial Services Group
- Shanghai Huarui Bank
- Wenzhou Minshang Bank
- Liaoning Zhenxing Bank

=== Other banks ===
- Bank of Kunlun (昆仑银行)
- SiliBank (实利银行)
- Bank of Lanzhou
- Bank of Gansu

=== Branches and subsidiaries of foreign banks ===
The China Banking Regulatory Commission (CBRC) announced its approval for nine foreign-funded banks (marked with the "#" sign below) to start their preparatory work for setting up local corporations in China on 24 December 2006. Following this, additional banks have been able to incorporate locally.

The following is a non-exhaustive list. Asterisks (*) indicate that the bank does not service individuals.

- ABN AMRO (Netherlands)#
- ANZ Bank
- Banco Santander
- Bank Mandiri
- Bank of America
- Bank of East Asia (Hong Kong)#
- Bank of Montreal (Canada)
- Barclays
- BBVA Bank
- BNP Paribas
- BNY
- Citibank (United States)#
- Commerzbank
- Commonwealth Bank (Australia)
- Crédit Agricole
- Dah Sing Bank (Hong Kong)
- DBS Bank (Singapore)#
- Deutsche Bank
- Fubon Bank (Taiwan)
- Hana Bank (South Korea)
- Hang Seng Bank#
- HSBC
- ING Bank
- Intesa Sanpaolo
- JPMorgan Chase (United States)*
- Kasikornbank (Thailand)
- KBC Bank
- Mizuho Corporate Bank (Japan)*#
- MUFG (Japan)*#
- National Australia Bank
- Natixis
- Norddeutsche Landesbank
- OCBC Wing Hang Bank (Hong Kong)
- Oversea-Chinese Banking Corporation (Singapore)
- Rabobank
- Raiffeisen Bank International
- Royal Bank of Scotland
- Scotiabank (Canada)
- Shinhan Bank (South Korea)
- Societe Generale (France)
- SPD Silicon Valley Bank
- Standard Chartered (United Kingdom)#
- UBS
- United Overseas Bank (Singapore)
- VTB Bank
- Wells Fargo
- Westpac
- Woori Bank (South Korea)

== Banks in the Special Administrative Regions ==
=== Hong Kong ===
The currency board and de facto central bank of Hong Kong is Hong Kong Monetary Authority. Banknotes of the Hong Kong Dollar, the official currency of the HKSAR, is issued by Hong Kong Monetary Authority, Bank of China (Hong Kong), HSBC and Standard Chartered Bank (Hong Kong).

Part of commercial banks in Hong Kong are listed below.

- Bank of China (Hong Kong) Limited
- Bank of East Asia Limited
- China Construction Bank (Asia) Corporation Limited
- Chiyu Banking Corporation Limited
- Chong Hing Bank Limited
- Citibank (Hong Kong) Limited
- CITIC Ka Wah Bank Limited
- Columbia Bank Limited
- Dah Sing Bank Limited
- DBS Bank (Hong Kong) Limited
- East Asia Banking Corporation Limited
- Fubon Bank (Hong Kong) Limited
- Hang Seng Bank Limited
- Hongkong and Shanghai Banking Corporation Limited (HSBC)
- Industrial and Commercial Bank of China (Asia) Limited
- MEVAS Bank Limited
- Nanyang Commercial Bank Limited
- OCBC Wing Hang Bank Limited (Banco OCBC Weng Hang, S.A.)
- Public Bank (Hong Kong) Limited
- Shanghai Commercial Bank Ltd.
- Standard Bank Asia Limited
- Standard Chartered Bank (Hong Kong) Limited
- Tai Sang Bank Ltd.
- Tai Yau Bank Ltd.
- CMB Wing Lung Bank Limited
- East West Bank

=== Macau ===
The currency board and de facto central bank of Macau is the Monetary Authority of Macao.

Banknotes of the Macau pataca, the official currency of the Macau SAR, is issued by Monetary Authority of Macao, Banco da China, Sucursal de Macau and Banco Nacional Ultramarino.

Some commercial banks in Macau are listed below:

- Well Link Bank, S.A. – Well Link Bank, S.A.
- OCBC Wing Hang Bank Limited – Banco Weng Hang, S.A.
- Banco Delta Asia Limited – Banco Delta Ásia, S.A.R.L.
- China Construction Bank (Macau) Corporation Limited – Banco de Construção da China (Macau), S.A.
- Industrial and Commercial Bank of China (Macau) – Banco Industrial e Comercial da China (Macau), S.A.
- Luso International Banking Limited – Banco Luso Internacional, S.A.
- Banco Comercial de Macau, S.A. – Banco Comercial Português, S.A.
- The Macau Chinese Bank Ltd. – Banco Chinês de Macau, S.A.
- Banco Nacional Ultramarino, S.A. – Banco Nacional Ultramarino, S.A.

== See also ==
- People's Bank of China – the central bank of China
- Cross-Border Inter-Bank Payments System
- List of banks in Hong Kong
- List of banks in Macau
