= List of largest Chinese companies =

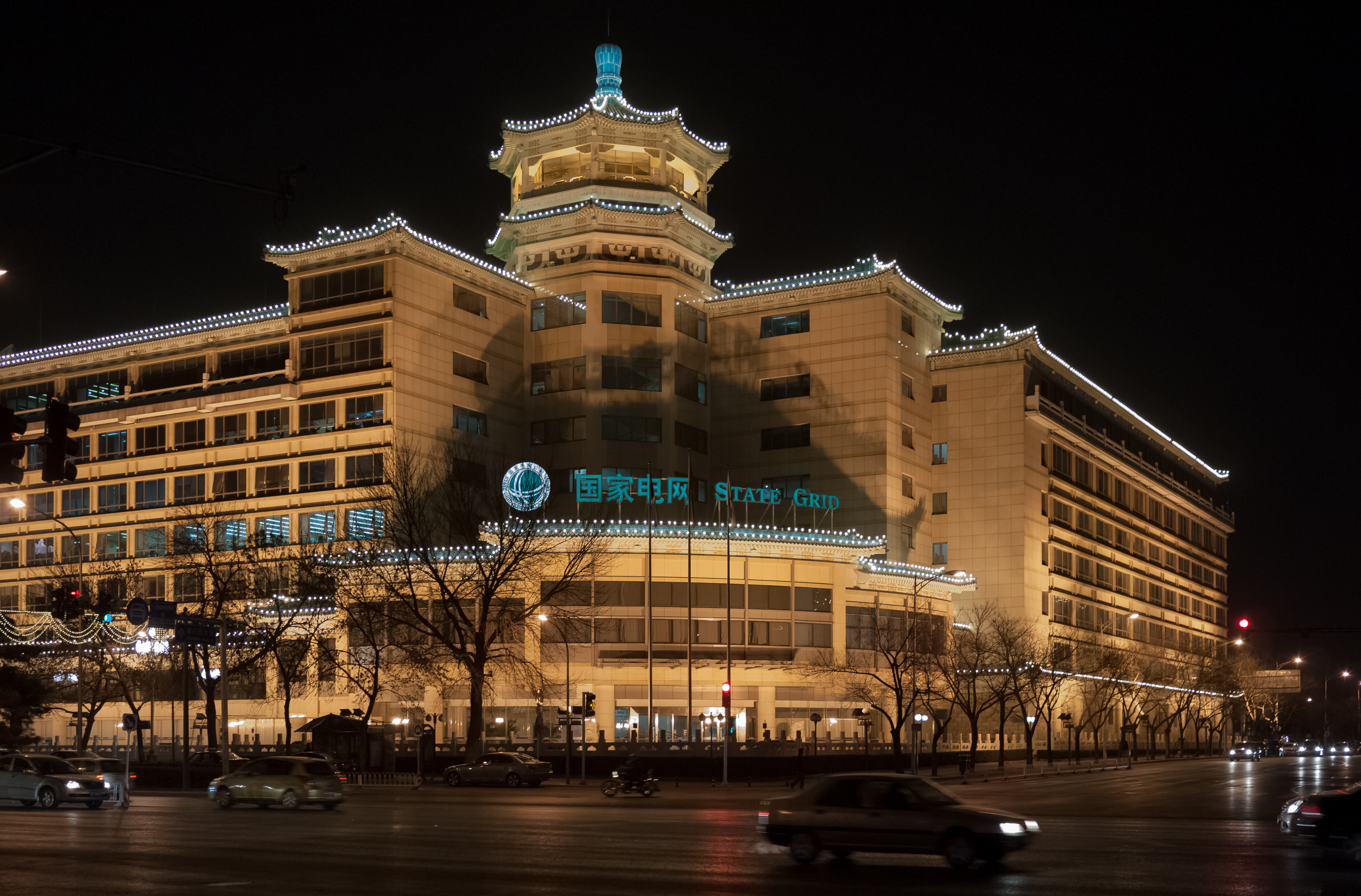
The headquarters of the electric utility company State Grid in Beijing. It was China's largest and the world's third-largest company by revenue in 2021, with annual revenues of over US$460 billion. The Industrial and Commercial Bank of China was both China and the world's largest company by assets in 2021, with over US$5.5 trillion in total assets.

This article lists the largest companies in China in terms of their revenue, net profit and total assets, according to the American business magazines Fortune and Forbes. In 2022, Fortune's Global 500 list of the world's largest corporations included 145 Chinese companies in total. Over the same year, Forbes reported that three of the world's ten largest public companies were Chinese, including the world's largest bank by total assets, the Industrial and Commercial Bank of China. Many of China's largest companies are state-owned enterprises, due to the significant presence of the Chinese government in the national economy.

== 2025 Fortune Global 500 List ==
This list details the twenty five largest Chinese companies according to the Fortune Global 500, which ranks the world's largest companies by annual revenue. The figures below are given in millions of US dollars and are for their respective fiscal year ending on or before 31 March 2024. Also listed for each company are the location of its headquarters, their primary industry and their number of employees, in addition to ownership characteristics.

Rank	Fortune 500 rank	Name	Headquarters	Revenue (US$ million)	Profit (US$ million)	Employees	Industry	Ownership
1	3	State Grid Corporation	Beijing	548,414	10,045	1,354,310	Utilities	State-owned enterprise
2	5	China National Petroleum	Beijing	412,645	22,424	985,155	Oil and gas	State-owned enterprise
3	6	Sinopec	Beijing	407,490	8,036	495,096	Oil and gas	State-owned enterprise
4	16	China State Construction Engineering	Beijing	304,121	3,667	361,249	Construction and real estate	State-owned enterprise
5	26	ICBC	Beijing	221,461	50,948	415,159	Commercial banking	State-owned enterprise
6	30	Agricultural Bank of China	Beijing	197,466	39,205	454,716	Commercial banking	State-owned enterprise
7	31	China Construction Bank	Beijing	196,738	46,693	376,847	Commercial banking	State-owned enterprise
8	38	Bank of China	Beijing	176,142	33,056	312,757	Commercial banking	State-owned enterprise
9	43	China Railway Engineering	Beijing	161,337	1,811	313,067	Railway construction	State-owned enterprise
10	44	JD.com	Beijing	161,055	5,748	570,895	E-commerce	Public company
11	45	China Life Insurance	Beijing	160,277	1,329	179,415	Insurance	State-owned enterprise
12	47	Ping An Insurance	Shenzhen	158,627	17,596	273,053	Insurance	Public company
13	51	China Railway Construction	Beijing	148,467	1,265	325,108	Railway construction	State-owned enterprise
14	58	China Mobile	Beijing/Hong Kong	145,240	14,699	456,965	Telecommunications	State-owned enterprise
15	61	China Communications Construction	Beijing	139,229	937	204,994	Construction and real estate	State-owned enterprise
16	62	CITIC Group	Beijing	138,941	3,953	214,660	Conglomerate	State-owned enterprise
17	63	Alibaba Group	Hangzhou	138,065	18,029	124,320	E-commerce	Public company
18	65	China National Offshore Oil	Beijing	130,832	14,773	85,957	Oil and gas	State-owned enterprise
19	67	China Resources National	Hong Kong	129,624	3,638	396,087	Conglomerate	State-owned enterprise
20	73	China Baowu Steel Group	Shanghai	125,113	2,497	237,100	Iron and steel	State-owned enterprise
21	81	Hengli Group	Suzhou	121,126	816	211,360	Textiles	Privately held company
22	82	Shandong Energy Group	Jinan	120,426	105	143,217	Energy	State-owned enterprise
23	83	Huawei	Shenzhen	119,813	8,685	208,000	Technology	Privately held company
24	84	China Southern Power Grid	Guangzhou	118,607	2,501	269,097	Utilities	State-owned enterprise
25	86	China Minmetals	Beijing	115,806	924	170,430	Mining	State-owned enterprise
26	91	BYD	Shenzhen	108,004	5,595	968,872	Conglomerate	Public company
27	92	China Energy Investment	Beijing	107,690	6,902	305,247	Energy	State-owned enterprise
28	98	Xiamen C & D	Xiamen	100,600	375	59,074	Construction and real estate	State-owned enterprise
29	100	Power China	Beijing	99,830	607	182,299	Utilities	State-owned enterprise
30	107	China Post Group	Beijing	97,544	5,222	732,227	Logistics	State-owned enterprise
31	116	Tencent	Shenzhen	91,764	26,973	110,588	Technology	Public company
32	118	Zhejiang Rongsheng Group	Hangzhou	91,534	25	23,653	Energy	Privately held company
33	119	Sinopharm Group	Shanghai	91,486	644	193,615	Pharmaceuticals	State-owned enterprise
34	133	COFCO Limited	Beijing	88,260	143	106,365	Conglomerate	State-owned enterprise
35	134	China Telecom	Beijing	87,997	2,553	376,371	Telecommunications	State-owned enterprise
36	138	SAIC Motor	Shanghai	87,224	232	134,323	Automotive	State-owned enterprise
37	141	People’s Insurance China	Beijing	86,323	5,858	175,121	Insurance	State-owned enterprise
38	149	Wuchan Zhongda Group	Hangzhou	83,322	428	26,233	Conglomerate	State-owned enterprise
39	155	Geely	Hangzhou	79,891	835	142,465	Automotive	Privately held company
40	161	Shenghong Holding Group	Weifang	78,612	401	59,553	Energy	State-owned enterprise
41	164	China FAW Group	Changchun	77,737	836	121,737	Automotive	State-owned enterprise
42	165	Jiangxi Copper	Guixi	77,668	364	32,863	Mining	State-owned enterprise
43	166	Shandong Weiqiao Pioneering Group	Binzhou	77,626	2,014	103,046	Textiles	Privately held company
44	168	Bank of Communications	Shanghai	75,834	13,007	95,746	Commercial banking	State-owned enterprise
45	170	Pacific Construction Group	Nanjing	75,683	4,898	265,245	Construction and real estate	Privately held company
46	178	Shaanxi Coal and Chemical Industry	Xi’an	73,684	1,359	140,860	Mining	State-owned enterprise
47	193	China Merchants Bank	Shenzhen	70,385	20,624	117,201	Commercial banking	Public company
48	196	Lenovo	Hong Kong	69,077	1,385	72,000	Technology	Public company
49	199	China Poly Group	Beijing	67,617	553	95,918	Defense	State-owned enterprise
50	201	Beijing Automotive Group	Beijing	67,200	88	97,000	Automotive	State-owned enterprise

== 2025 Forbes Global 2000 List ==
This list details the twenty five largest Chinese companies according to the Forbes Global 2000, which ranks the world's 2,000 largest publicly traded companies. The Forbes list takes into account a multitude of factors, assigning an equal weighting to revenue, profit, assets and market value. The figures are given in billions of US dollars and are for the trailing twelve months up to 22 April 2025. Also listed for each company are the location of its headquarters and their primary industry.

Rank	Forbes 2000	Name	Headquarters	Revenue (billions US$)	Profit (billions US$)	Assets (billions US$)	Market Value (billions US$)	Industry
1.	3.	ICBC	Beijing	222.0	50.8	6,688.6	251.3	Banks
2.	7.	China Construction Bank	Beijing	196.7	46.6	5,558.3	219.8	Banks
3.	8.	Agricultural Bank of China	Beijing	198.0	39.2	5,923.6	212.5	Banks
4.	12.	Bank of China	Beijing	177.1	32.3	4,855.8	164.7	Banks
5.	27.	Ping An Insurance Group	Shenzhen	158.0	17.6	1,775.2	107.3	Insurance
6.	28.	PetroChina	Beijing	383.6	22.9	377.1	136.4	Oil and gas
7.	33.	Alibaba Group	Hangzhou	136.4	16.7	254.1	285.5	E-commerce
8.	37.	Tencent Holdings	Shenzhen	91.7	27.0	244.0	562.3	Technology
9.	39.	China Merchants Bank	Shenzhen	70.4	20.6	1,664.8	143.9	Banks
10.	51.	Sinopec	Beijing	390.1	7.0	299.0	94.6	Oil and gas
11.	57.	Bank of Communications	Shanghai	75.8	12.2	2,041.4	64.4	Banks
12.	59.	Postal Savings Bank of China	Beijing	81.3	12.0	2,340.6	61.0	Banks
13.	75.	Industrial Bank	Fuzhou	56.6	10.7	1,440.5	59.7	Banks
14.	87.	BYD	Shenzhen	111.8	6.2	115.9	155.4	Automobiles
15.	89.	China Life Insurance	Beijing	55.4	14.9	947.7	51.0	Insurance
16.	111.	China CITIC Bank	Beijing	53.2	9.5	1,306.0	43.6	Banks
17.	120.	Contemporary Amperex Technology	Ningde	50.6	7.5	113.1	142.5	Automotive suppliers
18.	136.	China State Construction Engineering	Beijing	302.6	6.4	437.6	30.9	Construction
19.	141.	Shanghai Pudong Development Bank	Shanghai	48.6	6.3	1,296.3	42.7	Banks
20.	162.	China Telecom	Beijing	72.4	4.6	118.4	63.9	Telecommunications
21.	169.	China Shenhua Energy	Beijing	44.4	8.0	93.2	78.9	Raw materials
22.	171.	JD.com	Beijing	161.0	5.7	95.7	46.9	Retail
23.	184.	Midea Group	Foshan	56.6	5.4	82.8	71.6	Consumer durables
24.	200.	China Pacific Insurance	Shanghai	52.4	5.9	402.3	26.7	Insurance
25.	202.	PICC	Beijing	81.2	5.9	242.0	26.1	Insurance
26.	218.	China Everbright Bank	Beijing	37.4	5.8	996.9	24.8	Banks
27.	229.	Xiaomi	Beijing	50.8	3.3	55.2	154.4	Technology
28.	247.	Meituan	Beijing	46.9	5.0	44.4	99.9	Technology
29.	251.	Zijin Mining Group	Longyan	41.8	5.0	56.8	58.6	Raw materials
30.	252.	China Minsheng Bank	Beijing	40.5	3.9	1,070.7	20.2	Banks
31.	274.	Kweichow Moutai	Renhuai	20.5	12.0	41.0	267.3	Beverages
32.	283.	Bank of Jiangsu	Nanjing	21.1	4.4	541.4	24.9	Banks
33.	320.	Huaxia Bank	Beijing	24.8	3.9	599.6	17.4	Banks
34.	324.	Cosco Shipping	Shanghai	32.5	6.8	68.2	23.3	Logistics
35.	327.	Citic Securities	Shenzhen	15.9	3.0	234.4	36.9	Financial services
36.	335.	SAIC Motor	Shanghai	89.8	1.3	136.2	24.7	Automobiles
37.	344.	Bank of Ningbo	Ningbo	16.9	3.8	430.2	22.4	Banks
38.	345.	China Railway Group	Beijing	161.2	3.7	309.1	10.8	Construction
39.	346.	Gree Electric Appliances	Zhuhai	26.2	4.5	52.8	34.0	Air conditioning
40.	354.	Bank of Beijing	Beijing	19.6	3.6	579.0	18.0	Banks
41.	356.	China Yangtze Power	Beijing	11.5	4.5	77.6	99.2	Utilities
42.	371.	China Communications Construction	Beijing	106.8	3.1	254.6	10.4	Construction
43.	378.	Bank of Shanghai	Shanghai	15.1	3.3	451.0	20.4	Banks
44.	403.	Baidu	Beijing	18.5	3.2	58.6	31.2	Technology
45.	416.	Haier	Qingdao	39.6	2.6	39.8	26.6	Consumer goods
46.	424.	China Railway Construction	Beijing	147.8	3.1	255.4	8.7	Construction
47.	435.	Power Construction Corporation of China	Beijing	84.9	1.7	183.5	11.4	Construction
48.	457.	Luxshare Precision Industry	Dongguan	38.5	1.9	32.8	31.5	Technology
49.	463.	CRRC	Beijing	34.0	1.7	70.6	17.4	Railway equipment
50.	464.	Bank of Nanjing	Nanjing	13.8	2.9	381.3	15.8	Banks
51.	465.	China Tower Corp.	Beijing	13.6	1.5	45.6	191.6	Telecommunications
52.	491.	Shaanxi Coal Industry	Xi’an	24.1	3.1	32.7	26.6	Raw materials
53.	501.	NetEase	Hangzhou	14.6	4.1	26.9	67.5	Technology
54.	513.	Poly Developments & Holdings Group	Guangzhou	45.7	0.9	195.8	14.3	Construction
55.	519.	Wanhua Chemical Group	Yantai	24.6	1.7	43.8	24.2	Chemicals
56.	527.	Muyuan Foodstuff	Nanyang	20.4	3.4	27.3	29.9	Food
57.	532.	SF Holding	Shenzhen	39.4	1.4	29.3	29.7	Logistics
58.	536.	Baoshan Iron & Steel	Shanghai	43.4	1.1	50.7	19.6	Raw materials
59.	549.	China Coal Energy	Beijing	26.3	2.5	49.0	13.7	Raw materials
60.	551.	Weichai Power	Weifang	29.9	1.6	47.1	16.8	Automotive suppliers
61.	553.	Wuliangye Yibin	Yibin	10.8	4.5	27.3	68.8	Beverages
62.	567.	China Zheshang Bank	Hangzhou	18.4	2.1	456.1	9.2	Banks
63.	580.	China Hongqiao Group	Zouping	21.7	3.1	31.4	16.6	Raw materials
64.	596.	China National Nuclear Power	Beijing	10.4	1.4	86.8	26.4	Utilities
65.	600.	Bank of Hangzhou	Hangzhou	10.3	2.3	290.0	12.7	Banks
66.	621.	BOE Technology Group	Beijing	27.4	0.7	59.0	20.0	Electronics
67.	630.	CMOC Group	Luoyang	28.9	2.1	25.0	16.4	Raw materials
68.	638.	GD Power Development	Beijing	23.8	1.4	69.0	11.2	Utilities
69.	646.	China Energy Engineering	Beijing	60.4	1.2	119.1	5.4	Construction
70.	663.	Kuaishou Technology	Beijing	17.6	2.1	19.2	28.2	Technology
71.	665.	Huaneng Power International	Beijing	33.8	1.0	82.2	9.7	Utilities
72.	671.	Hengli Petrochemical	Dalian	31.7	1.0	38.4	15.0	Chemicals
73.	673.	Metallurgical Corp of China	Beijing	76.4	0.9	110.7	4.0	Construction
74.	689.	China General Nuclear Power Group	Shenzhen	12.0	1.4	59.6	16.0	Utilities
75.	694.	Longfor Group	Beijing	17.8	1.5	91.2	9.3	Construction
76.	705.	Great Wall Motor	Baoding	26.6	1.6	29.3	12.6	Automobiles
77.	706.	Trip.com Group	Shanghai	7.4	2.4	33.2	37.5	Tourism
78.	710.	Inner Mongolia Yili	Hohhot	16.3	1.7	21.5	25.4	Food
79.	712.	New China Life Insurance	Beijing	10.7	1.4	205.7	11.5	Insurance
80.	720.	Yankuang Energy Group	Jining	17.3	2.0	48.8	9.9	Raw materials
81.	731.	Li Auto	Beijing	20.1	1.1	22.2	23.8	Automobiles
82.	748.	Chongqing Changan Auto	Chongqing	21.2	1.0	27.6	16.8	Automobiles
83.	749.	Sinopharm Group	Shanghai	81.2	1.0	53.8	7.0	Pharmaceuticals
84.	751.	Aluminum Corp of China	Beijing	32.9	1.7	29.6	9.5	Raw materials
85.	754.	China Merchants Shekou Industrial Zone Holdings	Shenzhen	23.9	0.6	117.9	11.7	Construction
86.	768.	Hikvision	Hangzhou	12.8	1.7	17.3	35.6	Technology
87.	776.	East Money	Shanghai	2.2	1.4	45.7	44.9	Technology
88.	779.	Huishang Bank	Hefei	10.4	2.0	276.1	5.3	Banks
89.	782.	Guotai Junan Securities	Shanghai	6.8	1.7	143.5	12.6	Financial services
90.	785.	Beijing-Shanghai High-Speed Railway	Beijing	5.8	1.8	40.4	39.2	Logistics
91.	795.	Shanghai Rural Commercial Bank	Shanghai	6.8	1.7	212.4	11.4	Banks
92.	795.	ZTE	Shenzhen	17.0	1.1	30.1	13.7	Technology
93.	819.	Anhui Conch Cement	Wuhu	12.7	1.1	34.9	15.2	Cement
94.	823.	China Reinsurance Group	Beijing	15.7	1.5	69.6	4.8	Insurance
95.	825.	Huatai Securities	Nanjing	5.6	2.0	111.6	13.5	Financial services
96.	830.	Daqin Railway	Datong	10.4	1.3	29.9	18.6	Logistics
97.	854.	Anta Sports Products	Jinjiang	9.8	2.2	15.4	33.1	Consumer goods
98.	858.	China Vanke	Shenzhen	47.8	-6.9	176.2	8.7	Construction
99.	864.	Bank of Chengdu	Chengdu	6.3	1.7	174.1	10.3	Banks
100.	869.	Chongqing Rural Bank	Chongqing	7.4	1.6	222.1	8.5	Banks

== See also ==
- List of companies of China
- List of largest companies by revenue
