= Urban commercial bank =

Type of bank in China

An urban commercial bank (Chinese: 城市商业银行; pinyin: Chéngshì Shāngyè Yínháng) or city-based commercial bank refers to a type of bank in China operating locally with significant shares from the local government. Founded as urban credit cooperatives in 1980s, it aimed to provide funds for local small and medium-sized enterprises and stimulate local economy.

There are currently 162 urban commercial banks operating across China. In 2017, the total assets and liabilities of all urban commercial banks combined was 31721.7 billion yuan, making up 12.70% of all Chinese banks. Typical examples include Bank of Beijing, Bank of Shanghai, Bank of Jiangsu and Bank of Weifang.

== History ==
The first urban commercial bank was Shenzhen City Commercial Bank in 1995. In 1998, the central bank of China, People's Bank of China, advocated urban credit cooperative to change their names into urban commercial banks.

Most city commercial banks have strong ties to their local government and are majority or wholly state owned. Since 2005 some city commercial banks diversify their shareholders, inviting Chinese and international private companies to take minority shares, merging and cross-shareholding. Some of the banks have listed their shares.

Since 2008, an observable trend has emerged for city commercial banks to extend business beyond their home region. They are also often the main shareholder behind village and township banks (VTB). Taizhou City Commercial Bank, Bank of Beijing, Bank of Tianjin, Bank of Ningbo and Bank of Weifang are examples for city commercial banks operating in such ways.

== Notable urban commercial banks ==
Name (English)	Name (Chinese)	Headquarters
Bank of Beijing	北京银行	Beijing
Bank of Shanghai	上海银行	Shanghai
Bank of Jiangsu	江苏银行	Jiangsu
Bank of Ningbo	宁波银行	Ningbo
Bank of Weifang	潍坊银行	Weifang
Shengjing Bank	盛京银行	Shenyang
Huishang Bank	徽商银行	Hefei
Bank of Hangzhou	杭州银行	Hangzhou
Bank of Tianjin	天津银行	Tianjin
Harbin Bank	哈尔滨银行	Harbin
Xiamen International Bank	厦门国际银行	Xiamen
