= Lubei (disambiguation) =

Lubei (路北区) is a district of Tangshan, Hebei, People's Republic of China (PRC).

Lùběi (路北) may refer to the following locations in the PRC:

- Lubei Subdistrict, Hengshui, in Taocheng District, Hengshui, Hebei
- Lubei Subdistrict, Taizhou, Zhejiang, in Luqiao District, Taizhou, Zhejiang
