= China Zheshang Bank =

Chinese national bank

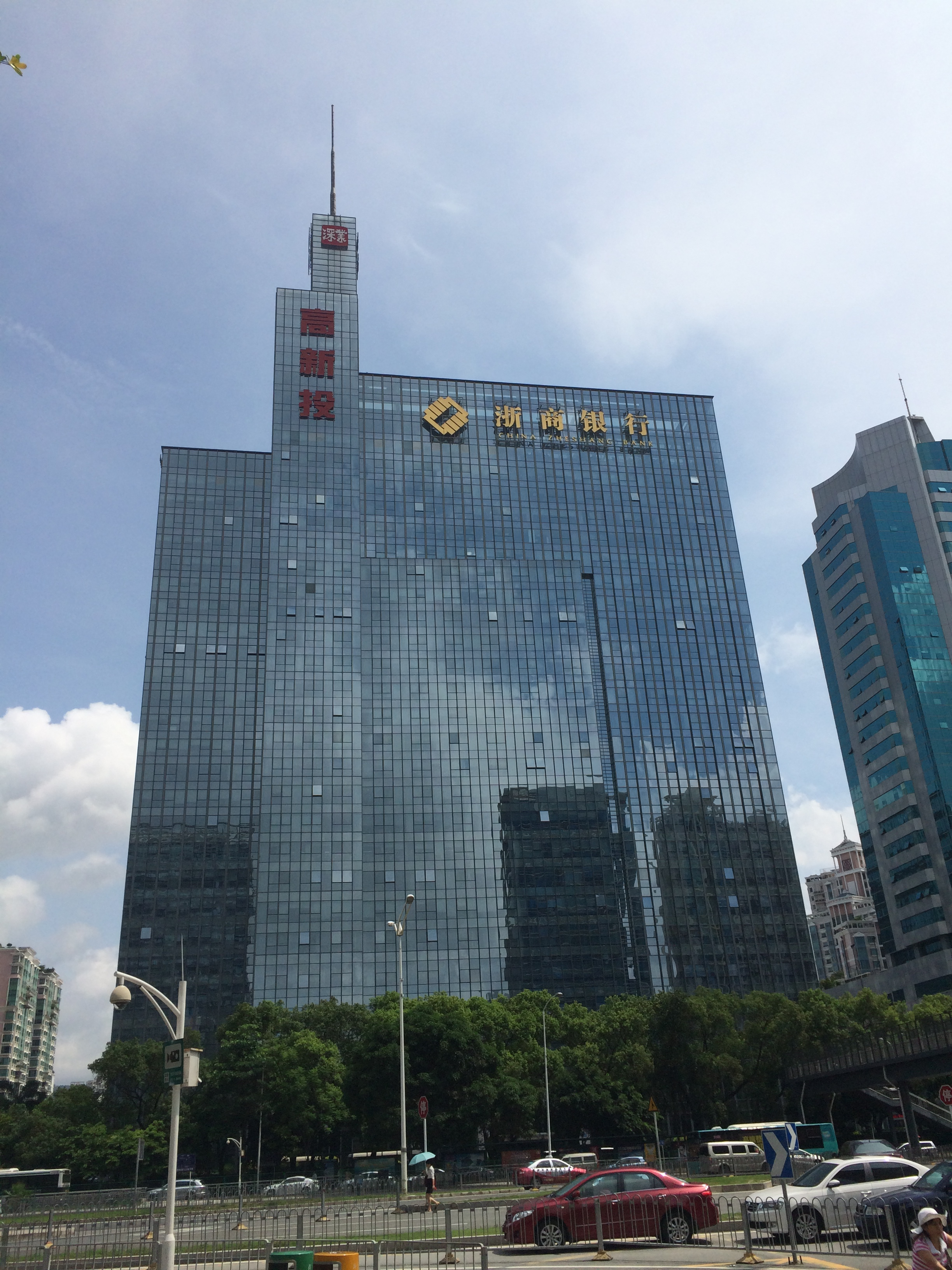
- China Zheshang Bank in Shenzhen
- Native name: 浙商银行股份有限公司
- Type: Joint stock commercial bank
- Traded as: SEHK: 2016; CSI Midcap 200
- Industry: Banking and finance
- Predecessor: Zhejiang Commercial Bank
- Founded: 26 July 2004; 22 years ago
- Headquarters: Hangzhou, Zhejiang Province, China
- Key people: Shen Renkang, chairman Liu Xiaochun, president and director
- Products: Finance and insurance Consumer banking Corporate banking Investment banking Mortgages; Credit cards
- Website: www.czbank.com

China Zheshang Bank, abbreviated as CZB, is a national joint-stock commercial bank based in the People's Republic of China and regulated by the People's Bank of China.

== Overview ==
China Zheshang Bank has its headquarters in Hangzhou, China and serves customers through a network of 109 branches across the major cities in the country. In 2014, the bank was ranked 208 in the "Global Banking 1000" list by the UK-based magazine The Banker.

== History ==
China Zheshang Bank trances its roots from Zhejiang Commercial Bank that was formed in 1993 in Ningbo, Zhejiang Province of China. The Zhejiang Commercial Bank was a Sino-foreign bank jointly owned by Bank of China, Hong Kong Nanyang Commercial Bank, Bank of Communications, and the Zhejiang International Trust and Investment Co.

On 30 June 2004, the China Banking Regulatory Commission approved the restructuring, renaming and relocation of Zhejiang Commercial Bank. On 18 August 2004, China Zheshang Bank was officially opened as a new bank in Hangzhou.

Once launched, the bank structured its overall business strategy in two five-year phases:

- Phases 1 - 2004 to 2008 - The main focus was the Zhejiang province market.
- Phases 2 - 2009 to 2013 - To focus on the developed regions of China.

As of December 2014, China Zheshang Bank had a registered capital base of CN¥ 11.5 billion, total assets of CN¥ 6,700 billion, CN¥ 360 billion in customer deposits and CN¥ 260 billion in issued loans.

In September 2015, CZB announced plans to raise around US$1 billion through an IPO and listing on the Hong Kong Stock Exchange. The listing details were yet to be announced as at the end of October 2015.

China Zheshang Bank logo prior to rebrand

== Ownership ==
China Zheshang Bank is a privately held company. As of December 2014, shareholding in the bank's stock was as depicted in the table below:

China Zheshang Bank stock ownership
Rank	Name of owner	Percentage ownership
1	Zhejiang Finance Development Corporation	19.96
2	Travelers Automobile Group	8.99
3	Hengdian Group Holdings Limited	8.30
4	Zhejiang Hengyi Group	6.21
5	Other	56.54
	Total	100.00

== Governance ==
China Zheshang Bank is governed by an 18-person board of directors. Of these, four are executive directors, eight are shareholders directors and six are independent directors. These directors select the chairman of the board. The current director is Shen Renkang.

== See also ==
- Banking in China
- List of banks in China
