= Zhejiang Tailong Commercial Bank =

Chinese commercial bank

- Type: Private
- Industry: Finance
- Founded: Luqiao District, Taizhou, Zhejiang, Eastern China (June 28, 1993)
- Headquarters: Taizhou, Zhejiang province, People's Republic of China,
- Number of locations: > 50 (2011)
- Key people: Mr. Wang Jun (王钧), Chairman of the Board; Mr. Wang Guanming(王官明), CEO
- Products: Banking
- Revenue: CNY 1 billion before tax (2011), around $150 million (Asset = CNY 50 billion (2011), around $ 7.7 Billion
- Number of employees: 8404 (2020)
- Website: www.zjtlcb.com

Zhejiang Tailong Commercial Bank (TLB) (Chinese: 浙江泰隆商业银行; pinyin: Zhèjiāng Tàilóng Shāngyè Yínháng), one of several SME financing service providers, is headquartered in Taizhou, Zhejiang Province, Eastern China. Since its inception, the bank has cumulatively provided over ¥150 billion (around $23 billion) loans with average loan size of ¥500,000 to its clientele, and over 90% of which are peasants-turned entrepreneurs. As its clientele often lacks the assets required by larger banks when applying for a loan, TLB grants and disburses loans secured through guarantors, which collateral form accounts for 99% of the total loans outstanding. In addition to that, the number of loan officers is almost half of the total staff, due to the labor-intensive nature of SME lending business. By the end of December 2011, TLB had eight branches, two village and town banks and 50 sub-branches which are mainly spread out around the Yangtze River Delta region.

== History ==
It was founded in 1993 with a registered capital of RMB 1 million and 7 staff, positioning itself at the very beginning as the small-and-micro-enterprise(SME) financing service provider and being upgraded from credit union to commercial bank in 2006, is one of few complete private holding city commercial banks in China. Although the credit union was performing adequately in the first half decade since its birth, it was struggling in the fiercely competitive Chinese market. As a result, the bank focusses its market strategy on small and mid-sized business.

By the end of December 2011, TLB had RMB 39 billion of deposit balance and RMB 26 billion of outstanding loans with NPL ratio of 0.58%, thereof SME loans took up more than 90%. When starting operations in 1993, the bank did not have many other choices than going into the niche of SME.

== Business ==
TLB has a strongly decentralized structure and delegates many authorities to the branches and sub-branches. Approximately more than 80% of all loan decisions can be made at sub-branch level.

== See also ==
- List of banks
- List of banks in China
