= County Bank =

County Bank may refer to:

- County Bank (China), a type of financial institution in the PRC
- County NatWest, formerly County Bank, now NatWest Markets
