= Gao Jianping =

Gao Jianping is a Chinese businessman who served as Chairman of the Industrial Bank Co. Jianping has worked most of his career in the company. It started in the Fuzhou branch, before heading that branch, moving on to head the Shanghai branch and subsequently the entire bank.

In September 2019, Industrial Bank's Chairman Gao Jianping resigned as he has reached retirement age according to company sources.
