= Zhu Shumin =

Chinese banker and politician

- 祝树民

Governor of the Agricultural Development Bank of China
- In office 24 March 2015 – December 2017
- Chairman: Xie Xuezhi
- Preceded by: Zheng Hui
- Succeeded by: Qian Wenhui

Personal details
- Born: 1960 (age 65–66) Yangzhou, Jiangsu, China
- Party: Chinese Communist Party
- Education: Fudan University

Chinese name
- Simplified Chinese: 祝树民
- Traditional Chinese: 祝樹民
Transcriptions
Standard Mandarin
- Hanyu Pinyin: Zhù Shùmín

Zhu Shumin (Chinese: 祝树民; born 1960) is a Chinese banker and politician who served as governor of the Agricultural Development Bank of China from 2015 to 2017.

Zhu is a member of the 14th National Committee of the Chinese People's Political Consultative Conference.

== Early life and education ==
Zhu was born in Yangzhou, Jiangsu, in 1960, and graduated from Fudan University.

== Career ==
Zhu joined the Bank of China in October 1988. He moved up the ranks to become governor of the Jiangsu Branch in July 2003 and vice governor of the Bank of China in July 2010.

In March 2015, he was named governor of the Agricultural Development Bank of China, succeeding Zheng Hui.

He was vice president of the China Banking Regulatory Commission (later renamed China Banking and Insurance Regulatory Commission) in April 2018, and held that office until March 2021.

Business positions
| Preceded by Zheng Hui | Governor of the Agricultural Development Bank of China; 2015–2017 | Succeeded by Qian Wenhui |
