= Qian Wenhui =

- 钱文挥

Chairman of the Agricultural Development Bank of China
- Incumbent
- Assumed office October 2020
- Preceded by: Xie Xuezhi

Governor of the Agricultural Development Bank of China
- In office December – 28 October 2020
- Preceded by: Zhu Shumin
- Succeeded by: Zhan Dongsheng

Personal details
- Born: January 1962 (age 64) Yin County, Zhejiang, China
- Party: Chinese Communist Party
- Education: Shanghai University of Finance and Economics

Chinese name
- Simplified Chinese: 钱文挥
- Traditional Chinese: 錢文揮
Transcriptions
Standard Mandarin
- Hanyu Pinyin: Qián Wénhuī

Qian Wenhui (Chinese: 钱文挥; born January 1962) is a Chinese banker and politician, currently serving as chairman of the Agricultural Development Bank of China.

He is a member of the 14th National Committee of the Chinese People's Political Consultative Conference and a representative of the 20th National Congress of the Chinese Communist Party.

== Early life and education ==
Qian was born in Yin County (now Yinzhou District of Ningbo), Zhejiang, in January 1962, and graduated from Shanghai University of Finance and Economics.

== Career ==
Qian entered the workforce in July 1985, and joined the Chinese Communist Party (CCP) in April 1989. He joined the Shanghai Branch of the People's Construction Bank of China in July 1985 and over a period of 14 years worked his way up to the position of its vice governor in November 1999.

Qian was appointed vice governor of the Bank of Communications in October 2004, concurrently serving as governor of its Shanghai Branch between July 2005 and November 2006.

In February 2015, Qiang was made deputy party secretary and chief supervisor of the Industrial and Commercial Bank of China, but having held the position for only two more years.

In December 2017, Qian became deputy party secretary, vice chairman and governor of the Agricultural Development Bank of China, rising to party secretary in October 2020. In December 2020, he was chosen as chairman of the bank, replacing Xie Xuezhi.

Business positions
Preceded by Zhu Shumin	Governor of the Agricultural Development Bank of China; 2020–2024	Succeeded by Zhan Dongsheng
Preceded by Xie Xuezhi	Chairman of the Agricultural Development Bank of China; 2020–present	Incumbent
