= Luqiao, Taizhou =

Luqiao 路桥区 Lukiao
- District
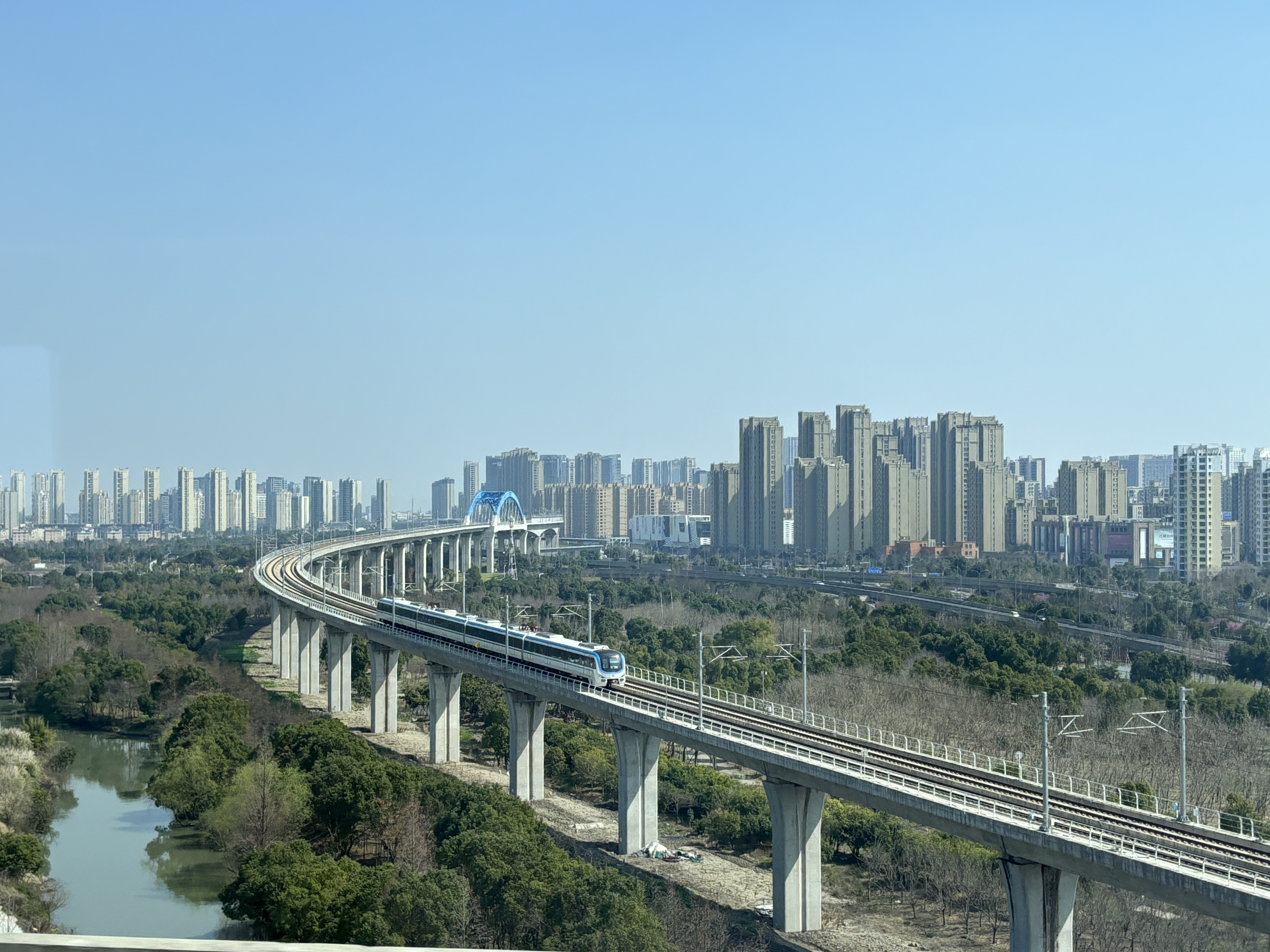
- S1 train in Luqiao

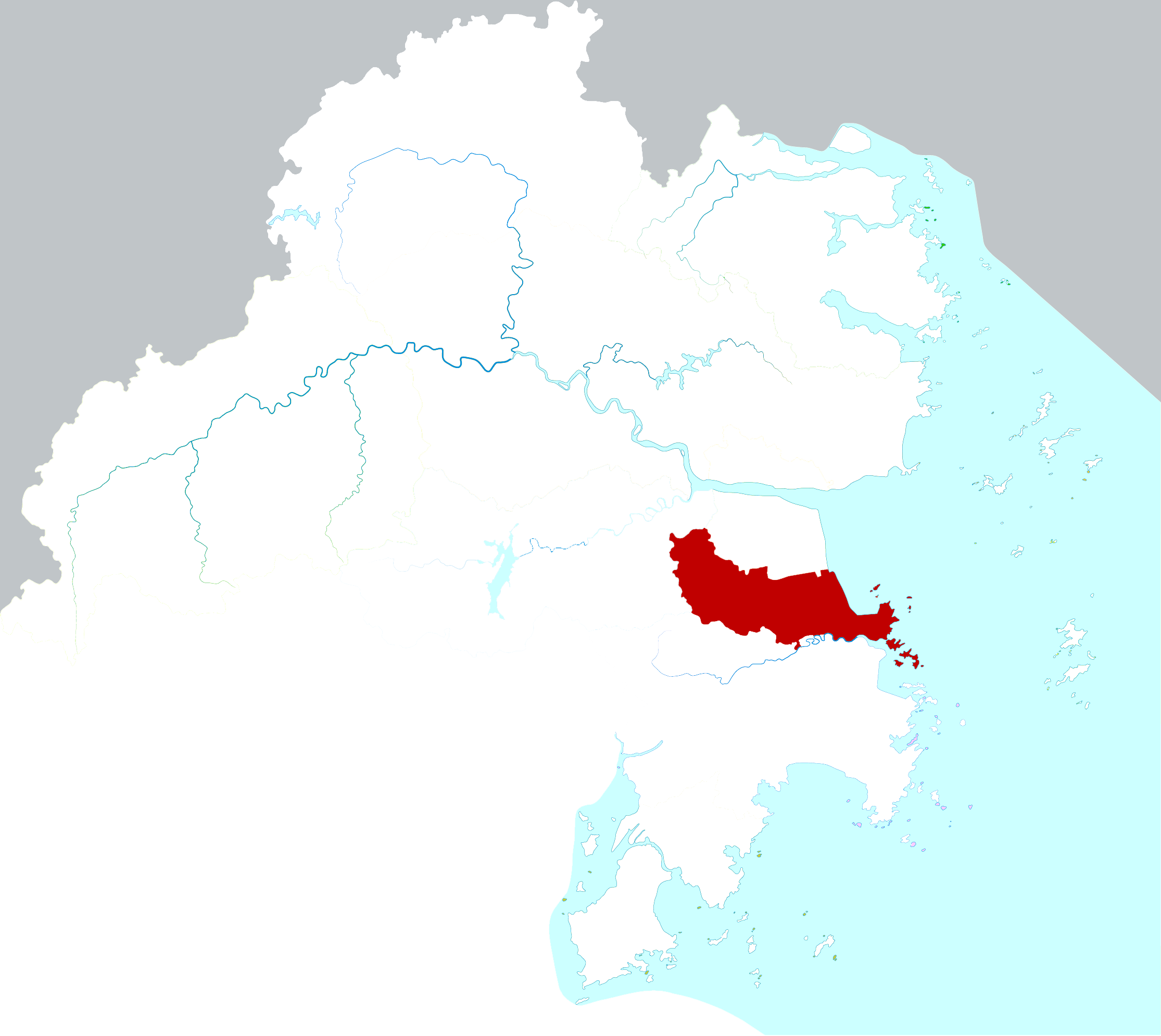
- Location of Luqiao District within Taizhou

- Location in Zhejiang
- Coordinates: 28°34′57″N 121°21′54″E
- Country: People's Republic of China
- Province: Zhejiang
- Prefecture-level city: Taizhou
- Township-level divisions: 6 subdistricts 4 towns
- District seat: Lunan Subdistrict (路南街道)

Area
  - Total: 274 km^{2} (106 sq mi)
- Elevation: 9 m (30 ft)

Population
  - Total: 425,000
  - Density: 1,550/km^{2} (4,020/sq mi)
- Time zone: UTC+8 (China Standard)
- Postal code: 318050
- Area code: 0576
- Website: zjlq.gov.cn

Luqiao District (simplified Chinese: 路桥区; traditional Chinese: 路橋區; pinyin: Lùqiáo Qū; Tai-chow dialect: Lu-giao K'ü) is a district of Taizhou in Zhejiang Province, People's Republic of China. The district has an area of 274 square kilometres (106 sq mi) and a population of approximately 425,200.

Luqiao District was established in 1994, having previously been a town under the administration of Huangyan County (present-day Huangyan District). Luqiao is the location of Taizhou Luqiao Airport.

== Economy ==
Luqiao District hosts the headquarters of Taizhou Commercial Bank and Zhejiang Tailong Commercial Bank, making it the financial capital of Taizhou. Geely car group originated from Luqiao and has a large manufacturing base in the district.

== Administrative divisions ==
Luqiao District is divided into 6 subdistricts and 4 towns:

- Lunan Subdistrict (路南街道)
- Luqiao Subdistrict (路桥街道)
- Lubei Subdistrict (路北街道)
- Luoyang Subdistrict (螺洋街道)
- Tongyu Subdistrict (桐屿街道)
- Fengjiang Subdistrict (峰江街道)
- Xinqiao (新桥镇)
- Hengjie (横街镇)
- Jinqing (金清镇)
- Pengjie (蓬街镇)
