= Zhan Dongsheng =

Chinese economist and banker (born 1965)

- 湛东升

Communist Party Secretary of the Agricultural Development Bank of China
- Incumbent
- Assumed office 22 October 2024
- Preceded by: Qian Wenhui

Governor of the Agricultural Development Bank of China
- Incumbent
- Assumed office May 2021
- Preceded by: Qian Wenhui

Personal details
- Born: November 1965 (age 60) China
- Party: Chinese Communist Party
- Education: Southwest University

Chinese name
- Simplified Chinese: 湛东升
- Traditional Chinese: 湛東升
Transcriptions
Standard Mandarin
- Hanyu Pinyin: Zhàn Dōngshēng

Zhan Dongsheng (Chinese: 湛东升; born November 1965) is a Chinese economist and banker, currently serving as governor and party secretary of the Agricultural Development Bank of China.

== Early life and education ==
Zhan was born in November 1965, and graduated from Southwest Agricultural College (now Southwest University).

== Career ==
Zhan worked for a long time in the office of the Ministry of Agriculture and then the Central Leading Group for Finance and Economics.

Zhan joined the Agricultural Bank of China in April 2008, where he was promoted to vice governor of the Sichuan Branch in May 2014 and was promoted again to become vice governor of the Agricultural Bank of China in February 2019.

In May 2021, Zhan moved to the Agricultural Development Bank of China and was appointed deputy party secretary, vice chairman and governor. On 22 October 2024, he was named party secretary of the bank, succeeding Qian Wenhui.

Business positions
Preceded by Qian Wenhui	Governor of the Agricultural Development Bank of China; 2021–present	Incumbent
Party political offices
Preceded by Qian Wenhui	Communist Party Secretary of the Agricultural Development Bank of China; 2024–present	Incumbent
