= GITIC =

Chinese company

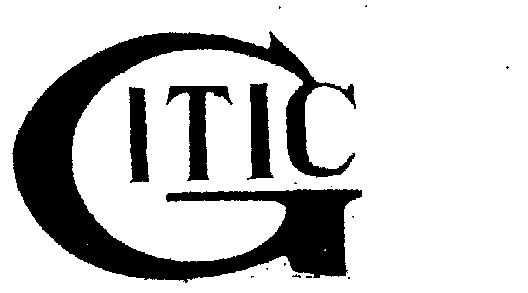

Guangdong International Trust and Investment Corporation (GITIC) was one of People's Republic of China's largest state-owned companies. On January 16, 1999, its bankruptcy was the biggest in the history of the country to date.
