= Lubei Subdistrict, Taizhou, Zhejiang =

Lubei Subdistrict 路北街道
- Subdistrict
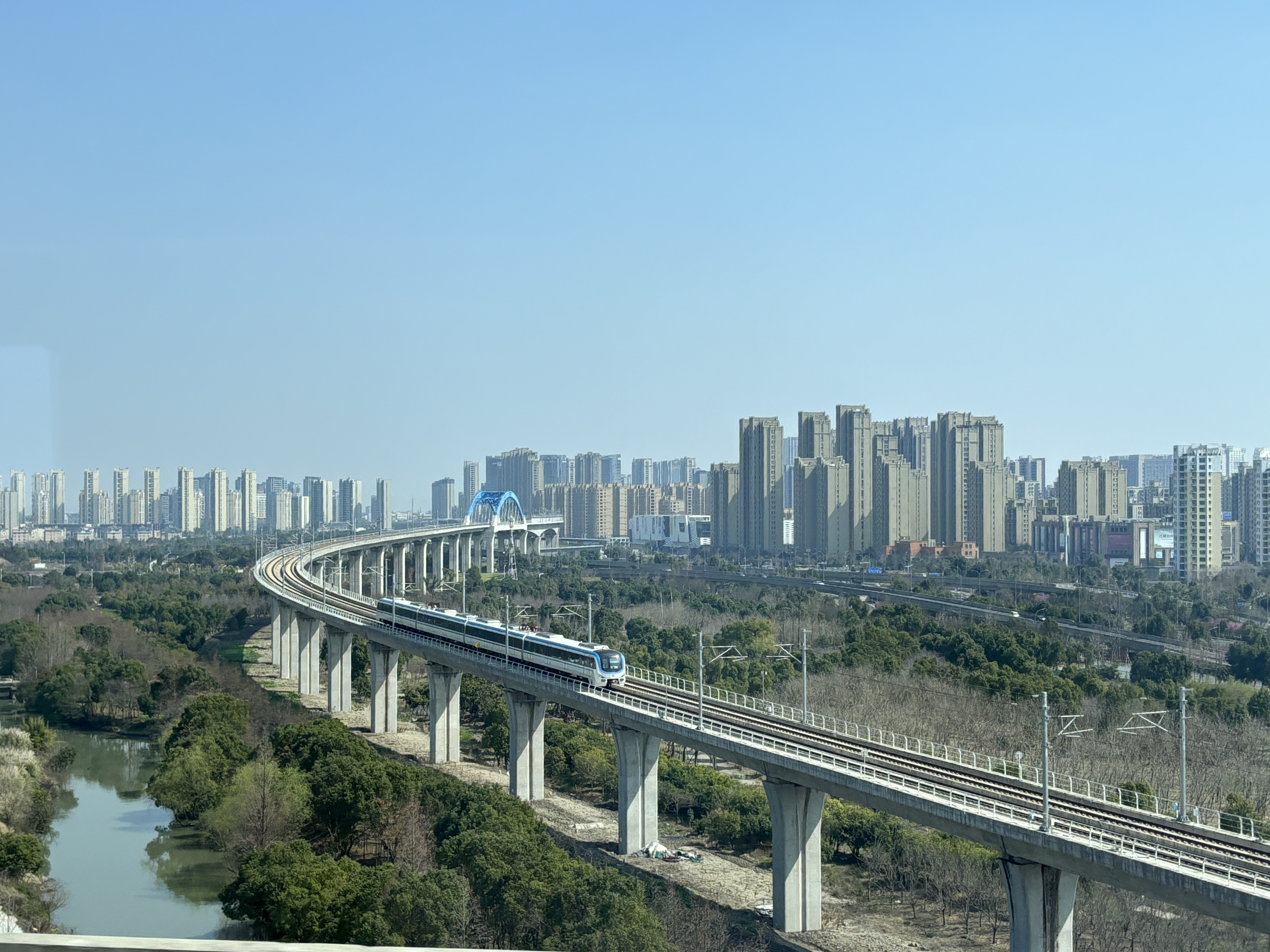
- Interactive map of Lubei Subdistrict
- Coordinates: 28°35′31″N 121°21′18″E
- Country: People's Republic of China
- Province: Zhejiang
- Prefecture-level city: Taizhou
- District: Luqiao
- Elevation: 6 m (20 ft)
- Time zone: UTC+8 (China Standard)
- Postal code: 318050
- Area code: 0576

Lubei Subdistrict (Chinese: 路北街道; pinyin: Lùběi Jiēdào; lit. 'north of the road') is a subdistrict of Luqiao District, Taizhou, Zhejiang, People's Republic of China, with its government office located north of China National Highway 104. As of 2011, it has 3 residential communities (社区) and 21 villages under its administration.

== See also ==
- List of township-level divisions of Zhejiang
