= Industrial Bank (China) =

Chinese commercial bank

Industrial Bank Co. Ltd

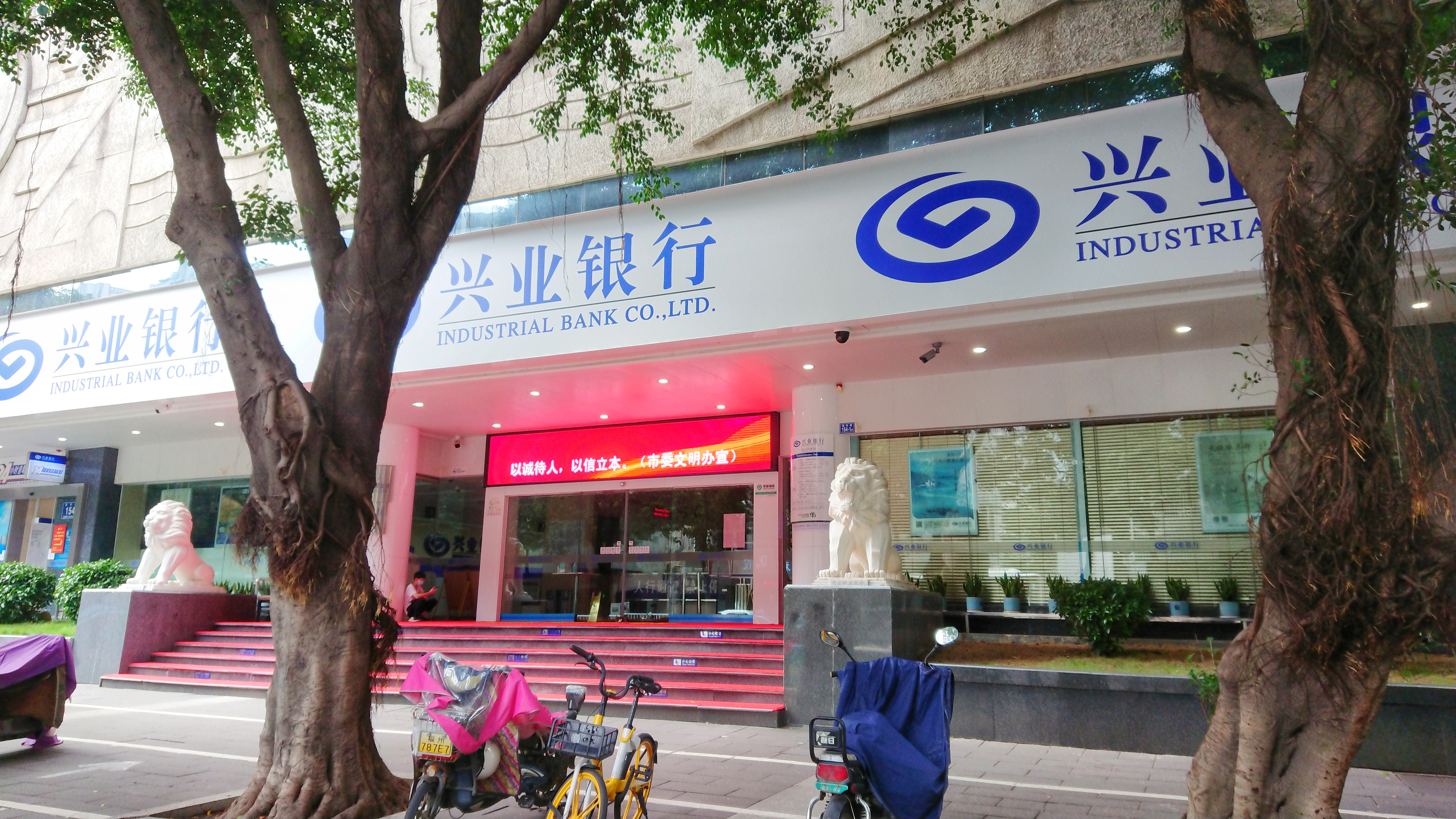
- Head office
- Native name: 兴业银行
- Type: Public
- Traded as: SSE: 601166 (ordinary); SSE: 360005 (preference 1); SSE: 360012 (preference 2); CSI A100
- Industry: Banking, Finance
- Founded: 26 August 1988
- Headquarters: Fuzhou, Fujian, China
- Key people: Gao Jianping (Chairman of the Board); Bi Zhonghua (Chairman of Supervisory Board)
- Products: Financial services
- Operating income: ▲CN¥61.91 billion (2018)
- Net income: ▲CN¥33.66 billion (2011)
- Total assets: ▲CN¥6.09 trillion (2016)
- Number of employees: 52,016 (2015)
- Website: www.cib.com.cn

Industrial Bank
- Simplified Chinese: 兴业银行
- Traditional Chinese: 興業銀行
Transcriptions
Standard Mandarin
- Hanyu Pinyin: Xīngyè Yínháng

The Industrial Bank Co., Ltd. (simplified Chinese: 兴业银行; traditional Chinese: 興業銀行; pinyin: Xīngyè Yínháng), officially Fujian Industrial Bank Joint-Stock Corporation, Limited (Chinese: 福建兴业银行股份有限公司), is a commercial bank based in Fuzhou, Fujian province of the People's Republic of China. In 2023, the company was ranked 60th in the Forbes Global 2000.

== History ==
On 26 August 1988, the State Council of China and the People's Bank of China approved the establishment of Industrial Bank. Its official name is, or abbreviated to Industrial Bank (China).^{[1]}

On 3 March 2003, it was renamed "Industrial Bank Co., Ltd.". It announced the completion of the shareholding system transformation. It is one of the first joint-stock commercial banks approved by the State Council and the People's Bank of China.

On 5 February 2007, the Industrial Bank was listed on the Shanghai Stock Exchange (Stock Code: 601166) with capital of RMB 10.786 billion.

In March 2012, the Industrial Bank's total assets reached RMB 2,629,398 million, shareholders' equity amounted to RMB 123,957 million, net profit for the first quarter was RMB 8,288 million, and NPL ratio was 0.40%. According to the "Top 1000 World Banks" released by the British Magazine The Banker in 2011, the Industrial Bank ranked 75th in total assets and 83rd in tier 1 capital. The Industrial Bank opened 79 branches and 662 sub-branches.

The Industrial Bank has a fully owned subsidiary, Industrial Financial Leasing Co., Ltd., and a controlling stake in Union Trust Co., Ltd. Headquarters-level operating units such as Financial Markets Center, Credit Card Center, Retail Banking Headquarters, Private Banking Department, Assets Custody Department, Bank Services Center, VIC (Very Important Clients) Department, Investment Banking Department, Futures Finance Department, Funds Finance Department, Trade Finance Center and Sustainable Finance Center operate in Shanghai and Beijing.

Industrial Bank is one of the pioneers of green finance in China, having adopted the Equator Principles in 2008. Since 2015, green finance has been the core business. ESG and climate are included in the comprehensive risk management system. The bank also announced its intention to redeliver RMB 2 trillion ($280 billion) worth of green finance loans to at least 55,000 green finance-oriented corporate customers by the end of 2025. By September 2022, the bank's green loan volume is 571 billion yuan (more than $70 billion, 11% of the bank's total loans) and has provided green financing worth more than 3 trillion yuan (more than $420 billion) to 20,000 projects.

== Business Activities ==
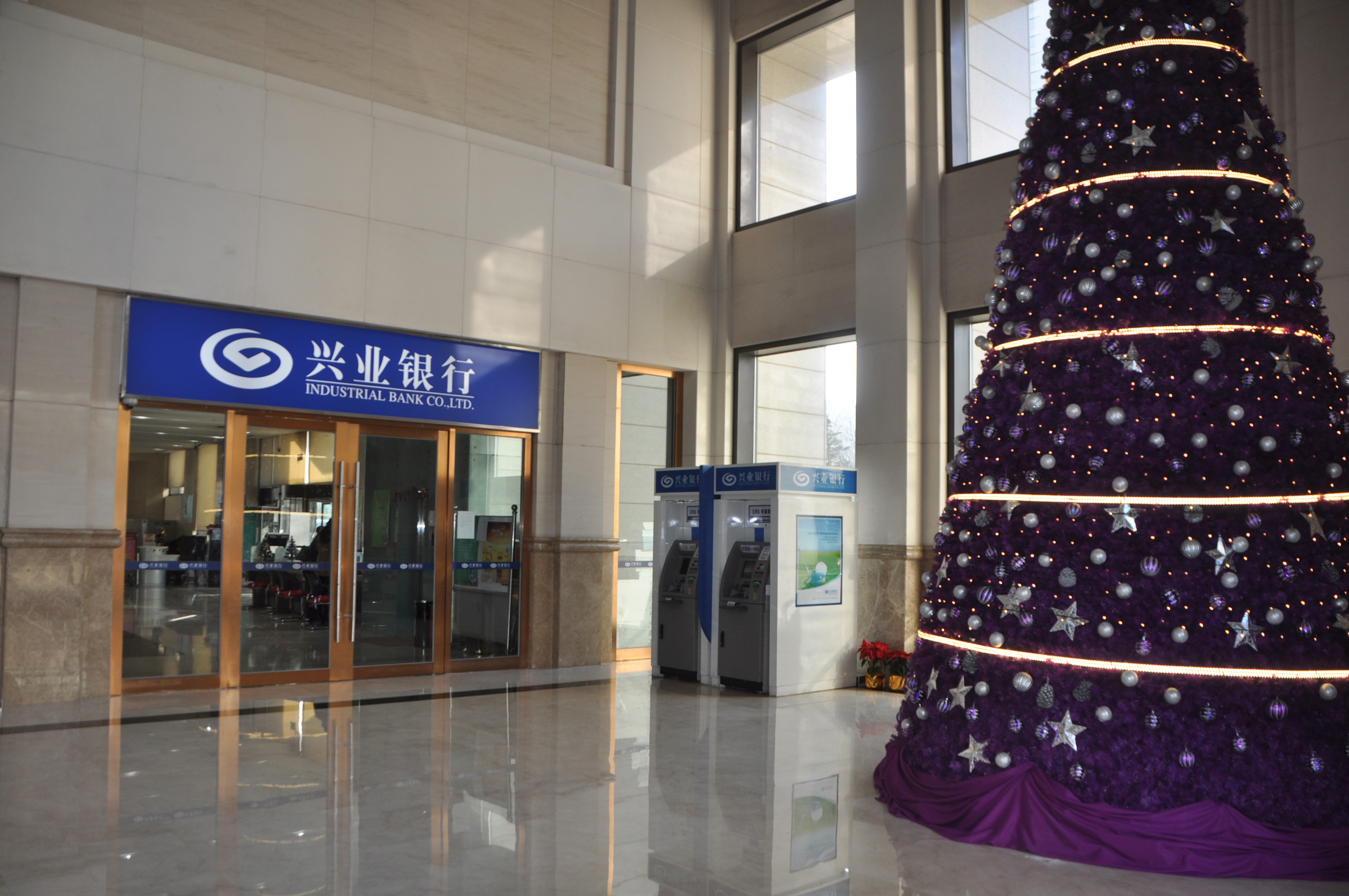
The Dalian Branch of Industrial Bank Co. (December 2013)

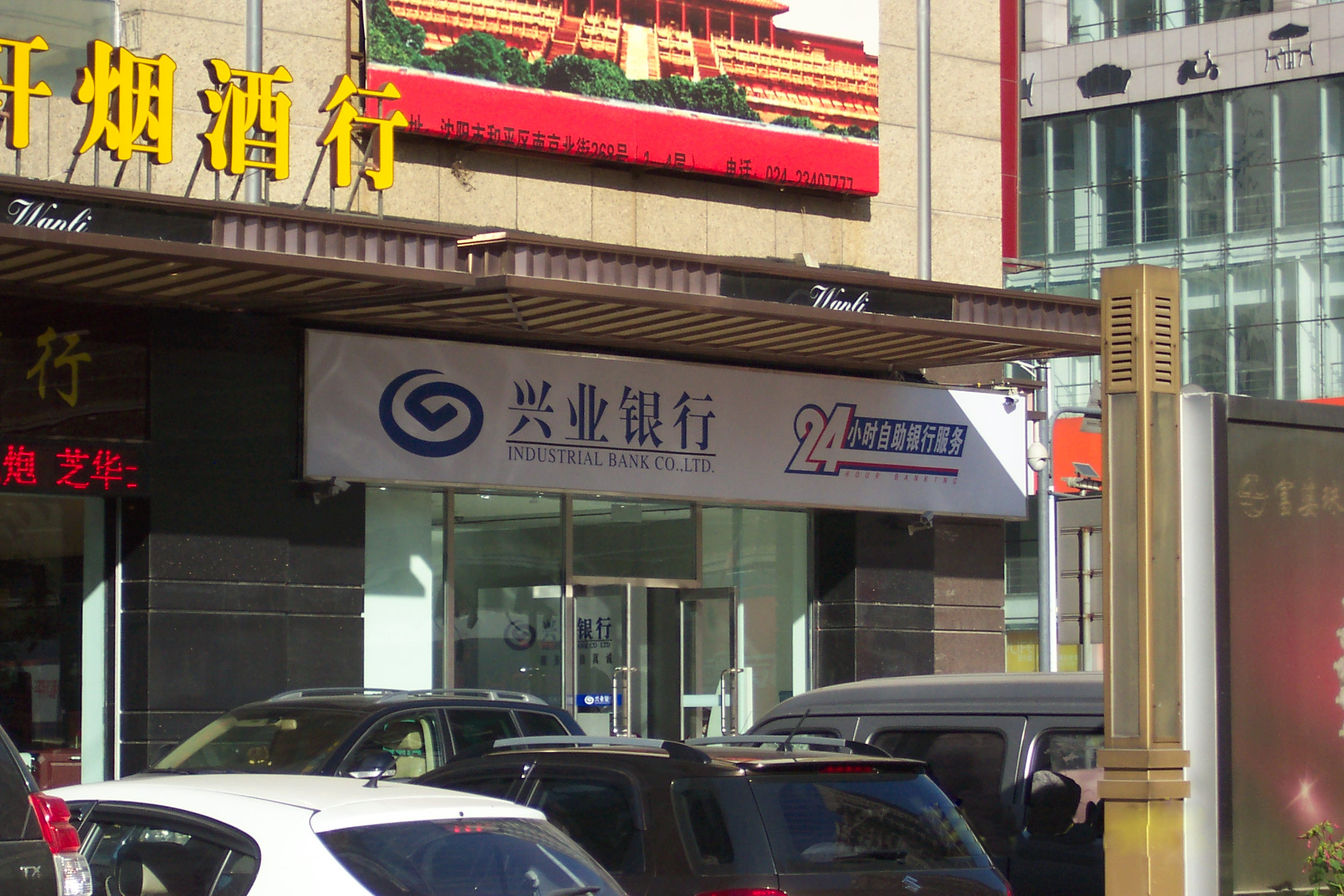
Industrial Bank Company of China

The main business activities of the Industrial Bank are:

=== Personal Banking ===
- Taking deposits
- Lending
- Local and international payments and settlements
- Safety deposit box service
- Credit cards

=== Corporate Banking ===
- Bills acceptance and discounting
- Issuing of financial bonds
- Provision of letters of credit and guarantee facilities
- Insurance sales
- Collections of payments
- Bank card business

=== Institutional Banking ===
- Agency issuing, cashing and underwriting of government bonds
- Purchase and sales of government bonds and financial bonds
- Inter-bank placements and borrowings services
- Agency service in trading of foreign currencies
- Settlements and sales of foreign currencies.

== Ownership Structure ==
As of 5 February 2007, the top ten shareholders in the bank were:

No.	Company	Shares	Proportion in %
1	Financial Bureau of Fujian Province	1020000000	20.40
2	Hang Seng Bank Limited	639090000	12.78
3	Tetrad Ventures Pte Ltd	199950000	4.00
4	China National Cereals Oils & Foodstuffs Corporation	170000000	3.40
5	International Finance Corporation	159960000	3.20
6	China Electronic Information Industry Group Corporation	150000000	3.00
7	Shanghai Baosteel Group Co., Ltd.	145000000	2.90
8	Fujian Tobacco Company	133333334	2.67
9	Shanghai Guoxin Investment & Development Co., Ltd	88000000	1.76
10	Sept-wolves Investment Co., Ltd	85333333	1.71

== Controversies ==
In April 2022, it was reported that Bank of Shizuishan, Industrial Bank, CITIC Bank, SPD Bank, Bank of Hangzhou, Huaxia Bank, Harbin Bank and Bank of Handan were involved in a fraud case related to Lihe Jimin, a Chinese private loan company, with the amount involved exceeding CN¥210 million.
