= Bank of Weifang =

Chinese urban commercial bank

Bank of Weifang Co., Ltd.
- Native name: 潍坊银行股份有限公司
- Type: Urban commercial bank
- Industry: Banking, Financial services
- Founded: August 1997; 29 years ago
- Headquarters: No. 5139 Shengli East Street, Kuiwen District, Weifang, Shandong, China
- Number of locations: 132 branches (2026)
- Area served: Shandong Province
- Key people: Bai Tongwen (Chairman & President)
- Products: Loans, deposits, wealth management
- Services: Corporate banking, retail banking, treasury management
- Operating income: ▲CN¥6.45 billion (2025)
- Total assets: ▲CN¥327.24 billion (2025)
- Owner: Weifang municipal government (state-owned controlling shareholder)
- Number of employees: 3,000+ (2025)
- Capital ratio: Tier 1 10.56% (Sep 2025)
- Website: www.bankwf.com

Bank of Weifang
- Simplified Chinese: 潍坊银行
Transcriptions
Standard Mandarin
- Hanyu Pinyin: Wéifāng Yínháng

Bank of Weifang (WFCB; Chinese: 潍坊银行; pinyin: Weifang Yinhang) is a Chinese urban commercial bank headquartered in Weifang, Shandong Province, China. Established in August 1997, it is a local joint-stock commercial bank. The bank became state-controlled following an equity restructuring in 2018.

The bank has been included in global banking rankings such as 429th in The Banker's Top 1000 World Banks list and 236th (Strength Rank) & 438th (Largest Bank Rank) in TABInsights' Top 1000 World’s Strongest Banks Ranking.

== History ==
Bank of Weifang was founded in August 1997 with the approval of the People's Bank of China. It was among the early urban commercial banks established in the Shandong Peninsula.

In 2018, the bank completed an equity restructuring and became a state-controlled commercial bank with the Weifang municipal government as its controlling shareholder.

In May 2024, Bank of Weifang's equity restructuring plan has been approved, allowing Weikong Group and Weifang Caifa Group to increase their stake to 9.67% and 11.68% respectively, while Weifang Jiaotou Group will join as a new shareholder with a 9.59% stake, increasing the bank's total share capital by 1.5 billion yuan. The bank has raised capital three times since 2021, and its assets have grown rapidly from 1,155 billion yuan in 2017 to 2,685 billion yuan in 2023, reaching 2,777 billion yuan by March 2024, alongside steady increases in deposits, loans, and profits.

== Corporate structure ==
=== Shareholding ===
Following its 2018 restructuring, the Weifang municipal government became the largest shareholder.

=== Subsidiaries ===
- Qingdao West Coast Haihui Rural Bank (Chinese: 青岛西海岸海汇村镇银行)

== Operations ==
=== Branch network ===
As of 2025, the bank employed more than 3,000 staff and operated 132 outlets.

- Headquarters in Weifang
- One branch in Qingdao with sub-branches
- Branches in Liaocheng, Binzhou, Yantai, and Linyi

=== Target customers ===
The bank primarily serves small and medium-sized enterprises (SMEs), retail customers, and the local economy.

=== Financial Markets ===
Bank of Weifang is a top 10 Chinese commercial banks in terms of bond trading volume for 3 consecutive years since 2023 according to Shanghai Stock Exchange.

== Financial data ==
=== Asset scale ===
As of June 2025, the bank reported total assets of RMB 327.24 billion and outstanding loans of close to RMB 40 billion.

=== Tier 1 capital ranking ===
According to The Banker database, the bank is included among global banks ranked by Tier 1 capital.

Year	Return on Assets (%)
2020	0.46
2021	0.57
2022	0.50
2023	0.43
2024	0.38

== Corporate governance ==
The bank's governance structure includes a shareholders' meeting, board of directors, board of supervisors, and senior management.

== Community activities ==
The bank has participated in community outreach and financial literacy initiatives, including volunteer programmes and public welfare activities.

== See also ==
- List of banks in China
- Shandong
- Weifang
