= Bank of Jiangsu =

Chinese commercial bank

Bank of Jiangsu Co. Ltd.

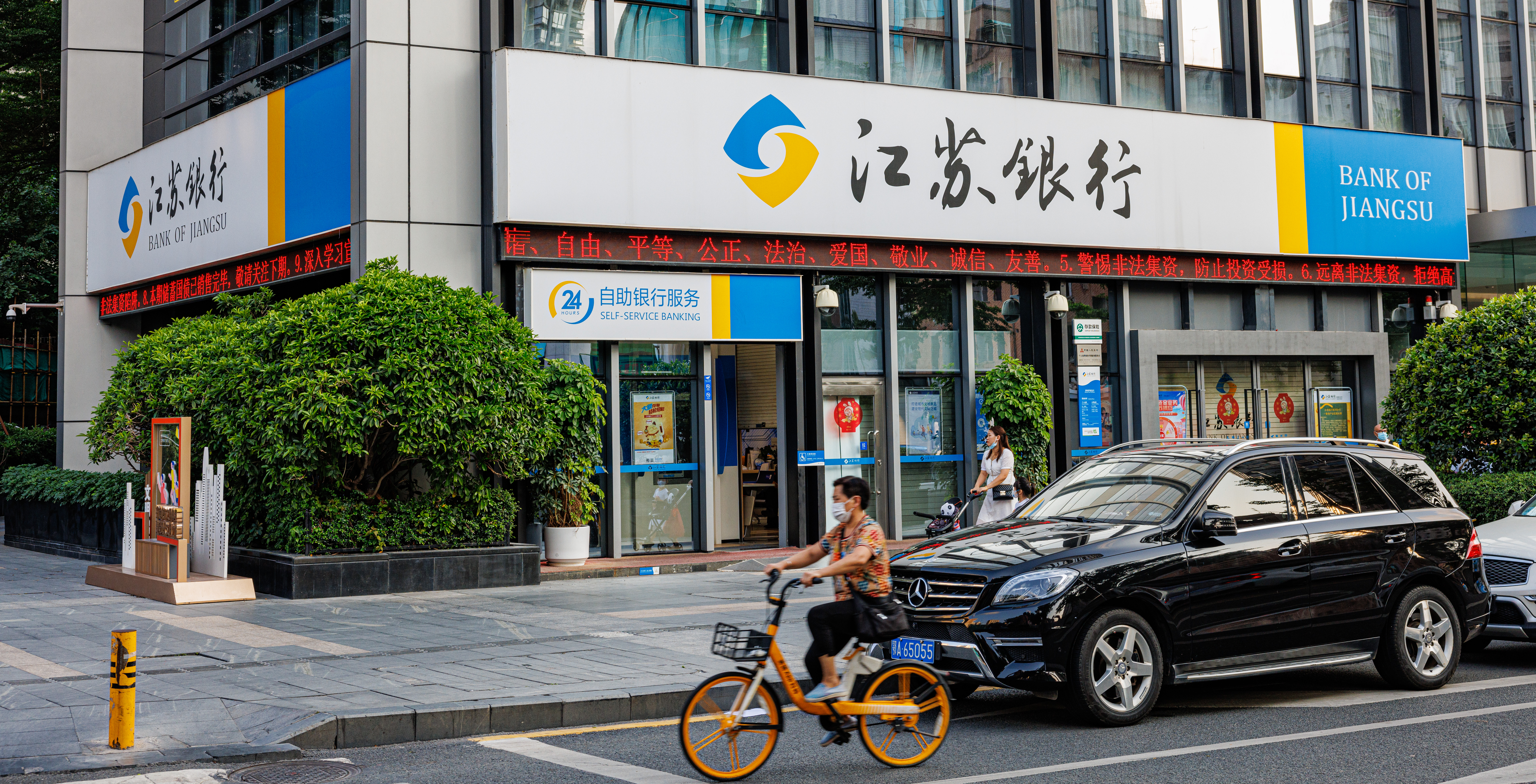
- Branch in Luohu, Shenzhen
- Native name: 江苏银行股份有限公司
- Type: Public
- Traded as: SSE: 600919
- Industry: Financial services
- Founded: 24 January 2007; 19 years ago
- Headquarters: Nanjing, Jiangsu, China
- Key people: Xia Ping (Chairman); Ge Renyu (President)
- Operating income: ▲CN¥74.29 billion (2023)
- Net income: ▲CN¥30.01 billion (2023)
- Total assets: ▲CN¥3.40 trillion (2023)
- Total equity: ▲CN¥259.12 billion (2023)
- Number of employees: 19,597 (2023)
- Capital ratio: Tier 1 11.25% (2023)
- Website: www.jsbchina.cn

Bank of Jiangsu (BOJ; Chinese: 江苏银行; pinyin: Jiāngsū Yínháng) is a Chinese joint-stock commercial bank founded in 2007 and headquartered in Nanjing, Jiangsu.

== Background ==
BOJ was formed from the combination and restructuring of 10 city commercial banks in Jiangsu. BOJ officially commenced operations on 24 January 2007.

In 2015, BOJ was generally seen as one of China's best performing local commercial bank. It posted a net profit of 9.5 billion yuan which was a 9.3% improvement from 2014. Its peers Bank of Nanjing and Bank of Ningbo had a profit of 7 billion yuan and 6.54 billion yuan respectively.

On 2 August 2016, BOJ held is initial public offering (IPO) becoming a listed company on the Shanghai Stock Exchange. It was the first A-share of a Chinese city of rural lender on the Shanghai Stock Exchange since 2007. It was one of the largest IPOs in Asia that year where it raised 7.24 billion yuan.

In March 2017, BOJ raised 40 billion yuan for two investment funds that would invest in asset-backed securities (ABS). They were the largest ABS funds in China where securitisation was growing quickly in line with the Chinese government's effort to deleverage its economy that was saddled with increasing bad loan risk.

On 15 October 2021, the People's Bank of China and the China Banking and Insurance Regulatory Commission named BOJ as a Systemically important financial institution in its list.
