= Agricultural Development Bank of China =

Policy bank in China

- Native name: 中国农业发展银行
- Type: Policy bank
- Founded: 1994
- Headquarters: Beijing, China
- Website: www.adbc.com.cn

The Agricultural Development Bank of China (ADBC) is a policy bank of China under the State Council. The bank was established in 1994 and supports rural infrastructure development. Its main responsibilities are to raise funds based on national credit in accordance with national laws, regulations and policies, undertake agricultural policy financial services, act as an agent for the allocation of fiscal support funds for agriculture, and serve agriculture and rural economic development.

In 2004, the bank implemented its first bond auction.

== Leadership ==
=== Chairmen ===
Name (English)	Name (Chinese)	Tenure begins	Tenure ends	Note
Xie Xuezhi	解学智	24 March 2015	October 2020	
Qian Wenhui	钱文挥	October 2020		

=== Governors ===
Name (English)	Name (Chinese)	Tenure begins	Tenure ends	Note
Zhu Yuanliang	朱元樑	October 1994	April 1998	
Xie Xuren	谢旭人	6 April 1998	2000	
He Linxiang	何林祥	23 February 2000	August 2024	
Zheng Hui	郑晖	August 2004	March 2015	
Zhu Shumin	祝树民	24 March 2015	December 2017	
Qian Wenhui	钱文挥	December 2017	28 October 2020	
Zhan Dongsheng	湛东升	May 2021		

== See also ==
- Banking in China
- List of national development banks
