= Policy bank =

Type of banks in China

Policy bank (Chinese: 政策性银行), or policy lender, is a state-owned financial institution established by the government of the People's Republic of China with the goal of implementing official economic policies and carrying out financial business in specific fields. This measure separates policy finance from commercial finance and establishes a policy bank to undertake strictly defined policy businesses. Policy banks' sources of funds mainly rely on issuing financial bonds or borrowing from the central bank, and generally do not accept deposits from the public.

There are three policy banks in China: the Export–Import Bank of China, the Agricultural Development Bank of China, and the China Development Bank. All the policy banks are under the State Council.

Each of the two is dedicated to a specific lending purpose. ADBC provides funds for agricultural development projects in rural areas and Exim Bank of China specializes in trade financing, investment and international economic cooperation. The CDB specializes in financing of infrastructure, energy and transportation.

== Development ==
In 1993, Zhu Rongji gave a speech in his capacity as governor of the People's Bank of China which helped serve as the basis for the subsequent development of China's policy banks. Zhu explained his view of how China's financial system should be structured, stating that the state "must establish a system of financial institutions, under the supervision of the central bank, principally consisting of national policy banks and state-owned commercial banks, but that encompasses a variety of financial institutions[.]" His proposed institutions included an export-import bank, a national interbank lending system, a short-term paper market, and an renminbi exchange rate mechanism based on the market rate. As researcher Zongyuan Zoe Liu writes, "The Party's contemporary economic power and financial influence are based substantially upon the institutions that Zhu envisioned in 1993, Fifteen years later, in 2008, China's policy banks and sovereign funds emerged on the global financial scene as some of the world's largest institutional investors, wielding significant influence over financial markets and projecting the Party's power abroad." Since 2008, policy banks have become major state instruments for growth and financing economically vital sectors.

In 1994, China established the China Development Bank (which focuses on major infrastructure and other projects that improve people's quality of life), the Export-Import Bank of China (which supports China's exports and imports), and the Agricultural Development Bank of China (focused on rural infrastructure). The Chinese Communist Party appoints the top-level officials of policy banks.

From 1994 to 1998, China's policy banks' fundraising was coordinated by the People's Bank of China (PBOC) through administratively apportioned bond issuance. PBOC required domestic financial agencies like commercial banks and urban credit cooperatives to buy policy bank bonds. This approach allowed policy banks to raise funds at a time when neither the market nor the state could provide the necessary capital.

In their international lending, China's policy banks lend primarily to developing regions. Policy banks have often been the first financial institutions willing to lend in various emerging markets. In 2015, China used its foreign exchange reserves to recapitalize China Development Bank and the Export-Import Bank of China. This in turn empowered those policy banks to make significant loans in Eurasia, Latin America, Africa, and the Middle East. Policy banks have an important role in funding Belt and Road Initiative projects.

Policy bank-financed projects generally can be categorized as either (1) projects which commercially-viable and would also be attractive to profit-seeking commercial banks, (2) projects which would not meet commercial lending requirements but which are viable according to policy banks' specialized criteria, and (3) projects which neither meet commercial lending requirements nor meet policy bank criteria but policy banks will lend if the host government enhances the creditworthiness of the project. The least profitable projects are in the last category and are the only ones where policy banks will request that host governments offer state-backed revenues or collateral.

Generally, policy banks have used market means to restructure or forebear debt issues as opposed to loan forgiveness. Chen writes that these practices challenge narratives of a "state-led" (as a opposed to a "market-led") approach to development assistance by China. Policy banks do not require debtor countries to make macroeconomic policy changes when provided with debt relief, a practice which China views as part of its adherence to the foreign policy principle of non-interference.

As of at least 2024, policy bank heads have been technocrats with finance experience. Academic Muyang Chen writes that having such policy bank heads is a factor which reduces the influence of economic ministries like the National Development and Reform Commission or the Ministry of Commerce over the policy banks.

== See also ==
- Banking in China
- History of banking in China
- Sinosure
