= Bank of Tianjin =

Chinese city commercial bank

Bank of Tianjin Co. Ltd

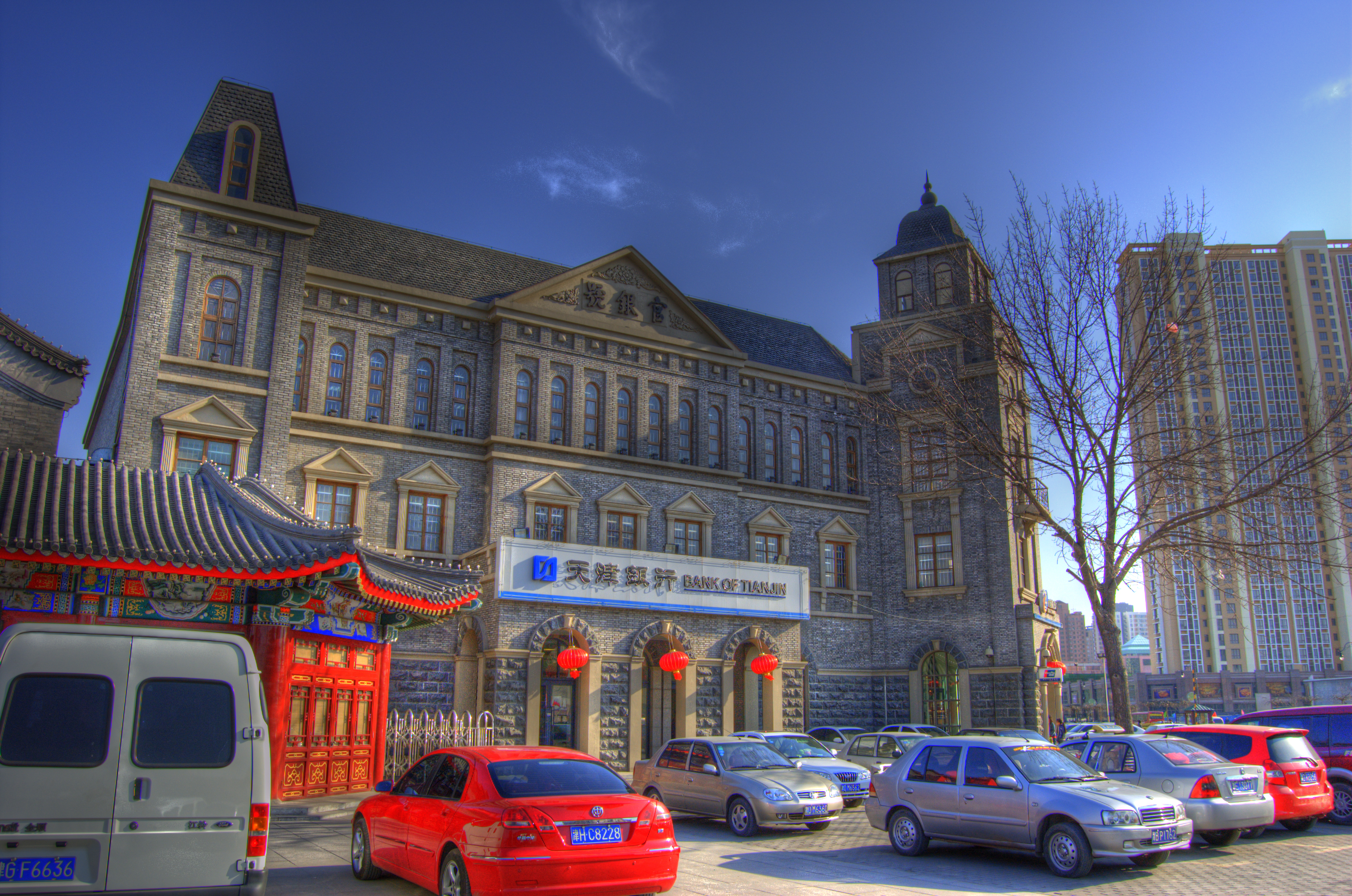
- Branch in Tianjin
- Native name: 天津銀行股份有限公司
- Type: Joint stock commercial bank
- Traded as: SEHK: 1578
- Industry: Banking and finance
- Founded: 6 November 1996; 29 years ago
- Headquarters: Tianjin, China
- Key people: Yuan Fuhua, chairman Yuanhua Wen, president and director
- Products: Consumer banking Corporate banking Mortgages; Credit cards
- Number of employees: 6,287
- Website: www.bankoftianjin.com

Bank of Tianjin (simplified Chinese: 天津银行: Tiānjīn yínháng) is a city commercial bank headquartered in Tianjin, People's Republic of China and regulated by the People's Bank of China.

== Overview ==
Bank of Tianjin (BoT) serves customers through a network of 109 branches across the major cities in the country. In 2015, the bank ranked 219 in terms of tier-one capital by the "Global Banking 1000" list by the UK-based magazine The Banker. As of 31 December 2015, the bank had 306 outlets and an asset base of RMB 564 billion (US$84.6 billion).

== History ==
Bank of Tianjin was founded on 6 November 1996 as Tianjin City Co-operative Bank to serve the local communities of the city. In May 1998 the bank was renamed to Tianjin City Commercial Bank.

In March 2007, the bank's name was yet again changed to Bank of Tianjin. This was after receiving foreign direct investment of US$111.4 million from Australian based banking giant, ANZ Group. This gave ANZ group a 20% stake in Bank of Tianjin. The same year saw the bank expand its operations into Beijing.

March 2016 saw the bank list H shares on the Hong Kong Stock exchange after an IPO that was led by BOC International, ABC International and CCB International. The bank raised US$950 million in the public offering short of the US$1.23 billion that the bank was initially targeting. After the IPO, the bank was caught in a $122 million fraud incident at its Shanghai branch. Agricultural Bank of China was said to be investigating a similar incident

== Investments ==
Other than its banking core business, Bank of Tianjin holds a 35% stake in Tianjin Jixian County Bank Co. Ltd, a commercial bank in Jixian County, China. BoT initially held a 53.87% in Tianjin Jixian County Bank, but later ceded their stake to other investors.

== Ownership ==
The shares of the stock of Bank of Tianjin are traded on the Hong Kong Stock Exchange, under the ticker 1578. As of 25 November 2016, the shareholding in the bank's stock was as depicted in the table below:

Bank of Tianjin stock ownership
| Rank | Name of owner | Percentage ownership |
|---|---|---|
| 1 | Australia and New Zealand Banking Group | 41.12 |
| 2 | State-owned Assets Supervision and Administration Commission of the State Council | 17.18 |
| 5 | Other | 41.70 |
| | Total | 100.00 |

== Governance ==
Bank of Tianjin is governed by a fourteen-person board of directors, with Yuan Fuhua serving as the chairman of the group and Yuanhua Wen as the president and executive director.

== See also ==
- Banking in China
