= Xiamen International Bank =

Bank in Xiamen, Fujian, China

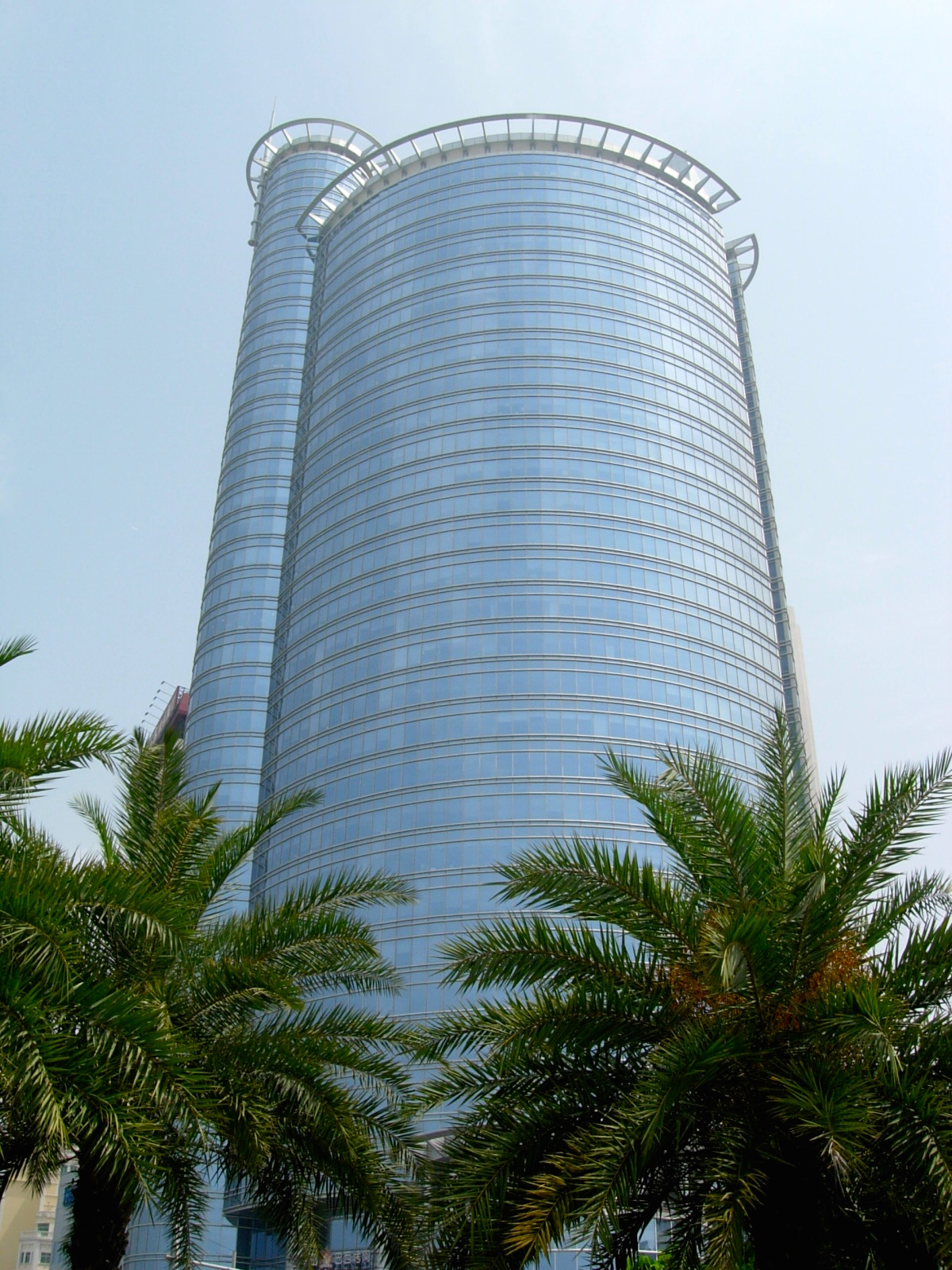
- Headquarters in Xiamen
- Type: Business group
- Industry: Banking, Finance
- Founded: August 1985; 41 years ago
- Headquarters: Xiamen International Bank Building; 8-10 Lu Jiang Road; Xiamen, Fujian Province, China
- Area served: People's Republic of China
- Key people: Chairman: Chen Guizong; President: Lu Yaoming
- Revenue: ▼CN¥12.51 billion (2023)
- Net income: ▼CN¥971.52 million (2023)
- Total assets: ▲CN¥1.12 trillion (2023)
- Total equity: ▲CN¥86.29 billion (2023)
- Website: www.xib.com.cn

Xiamen International Bank (XIB) is a bank headquartered in Xiamen, Fujian, China. It was established in August 1985 as the first joint venture bank in China with capital of RMB 410.069 billion. Xiamen International Bank has now grown into a bank that covers Hong Kong, Macao and mainland China.

== Locations ==
In Mainland China, XIB operates branches and multiple sub-branches in cities including Beijing, Shanghai, Fuzhou, Zhuhai, Xiamen, and a representative office in Quanzhou. After years of development, Xiamen International Bank has been listed as "World Top 1000 Banks" and "Asia Top 200 Banks" by The Banker magazine of the U.K. for many years.

XIB is based in Xiamen, Fujian Province, which also operates subsidiaries including Xiamen International Investment Limited (XIIL) in Hong Kong and Luso International Banking Limited (LIB) which runs 11 branches in Macau.

== Shareholders ==
- Industrial and Commercial Bank of China (18.75%)
- Fujian Investment and Enterprise Holdings Corporation (12%)
- Xiamen C&D Corporation Limited (7.5%)
- Min Xin Holdings Limited (HKSE listed) (36.75%)
- Asian Development Bank (10%)
- Shinsei Bank Limited (from Japan) (10%)
- Sino Finance Group Company Limited (from U.S.) (5%)
