= County bank (China) =

A county bank is a kind of financial institution with the purpose of boosting rural economic development, which has developed in China since 2005.

In 2007, China Banking Regulatory Commission promulgated “The Temporary Rule of County Bank”, in which the establishment process, organization and structure, as well as business scope of a county bank are specified.

Afterwards, CBRC further published two rules with detailed requirements on county banks, namely "Notice on Printing and Distributing the Guidelines for Examination and Approval of the Establishment of County Banks" and "Notice on the Relevant Policies for County Banks, Loan Companies, Rural Mutual Cooperatives and Small Loan Companies".

The county and rural banking sector has been growing rapidly, with over 1,600 banks opened by the end of 2016.
