= Bank of Taizhou =

City commercial bank in China

Bank of Taizhou 台州银行

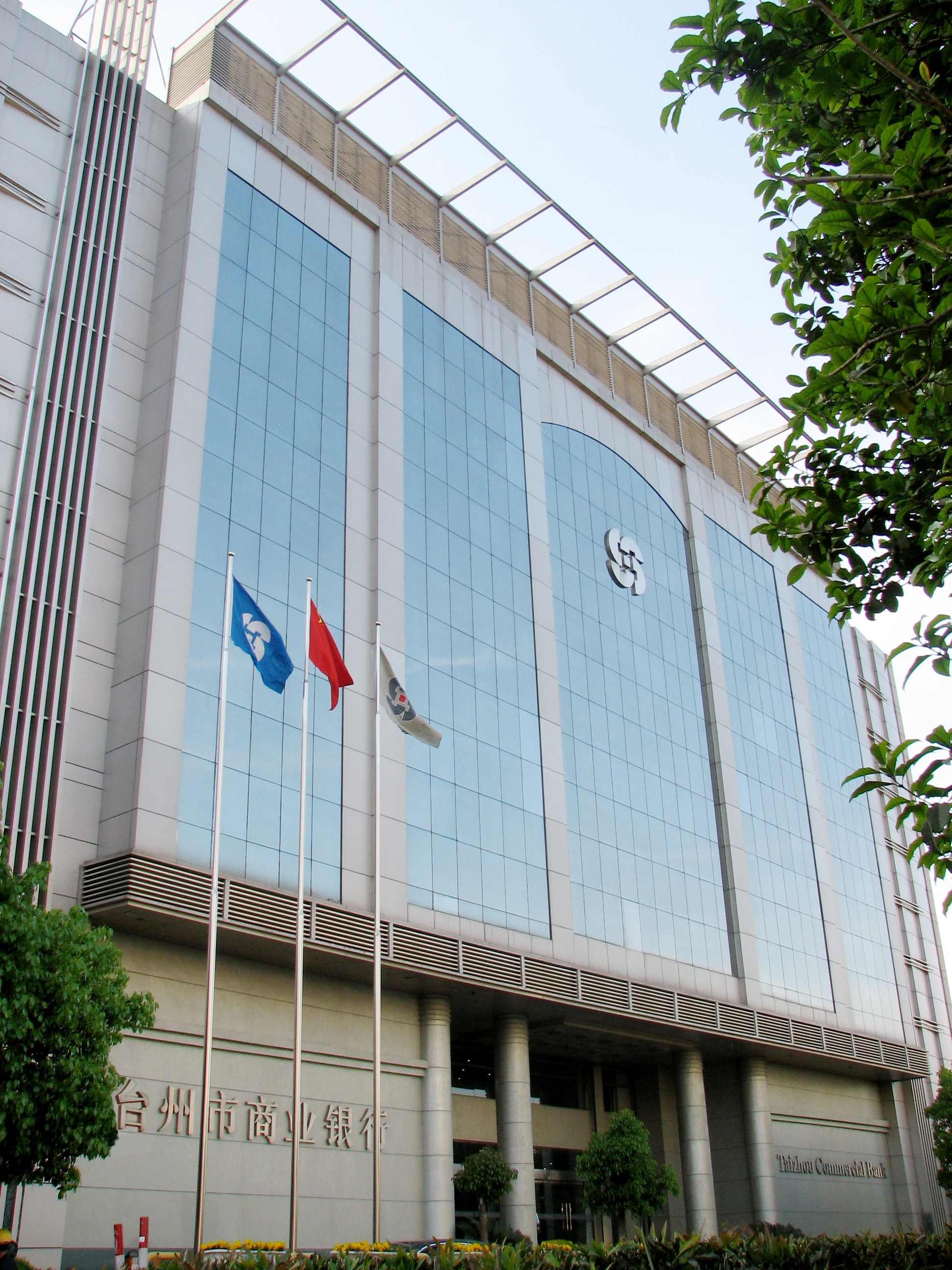
- Head office in Taizhou
- Type: Privately owned company
- Industry: Bank, SME finance, microfinance
- Founded: 2002 (1988)
- Headquarters: Taizhou, Zhejiang, China
- Area served: China
- Key people: chairman: Chen Xiao Jun president: Huang Jun Min
- Number of employees: 10000
- Website: www.tzbank.com

Bank of Taizhou (TZB; Chinese: 台州银行) is a city commercial bank headquartered in Taizhou, Zhejiang, China. On 9 September 2010, it was officially renamed as Bank of Taizhou from the original name of Taizhou City Commercial Bank (台州市商业银行).

The Bank was founded on 13 March 2002, by an amalgamation of eight local credit unions with a registered capital of RMB 300 million. It is the first non-state-controlled city commercial bank in China. Together with its predecessor organisation Yinzuo Urban Credit Union, Bank of Taizhou has a continuous history of 25 years. By the end of 2011, TZB's whole deposit balance total assets stood at 57.192 billion RMB, up 18% from the previous year. The total loan portfolio was 26.78 billion RMB and the total number of loan clients was close to 60,000. The NPL ratio was 0.30%, slightly up from the previous year.

The KPMG research study "China's City Commercial Bank: Opportunity knocks?" (2007) ranked TZB in twelfth place out of China's Top 100 city commercial banks. In 2008, TZB was awarded with third place in the "Comprehensive competitiveness rank of national city commercial banks" by the Chinese finance magazine "The Banker".

== Organization ==
By the end of June 2016, TZB has 10 branches, 7 VTBs (Village and Township Bank) and over 100 sub-branches. The branches are located in all districts of Zhejiang province. Bank of Taizhou is now operating on a nationwide basis, using its subsidiary VTBs to reach more distant locations. The VTBs are located Shenzhen Futian, Beijing Shunyi and Jiangxi Ganzhou, Chongqing Yubei and Chongqing Qianjiang as well as in Zhejiang Lishui Jingning and Zhejiang Taizhou Sanmen. The total number of employees in TZB is close to 10000.

== Business areas ==
TZB is focused on SME finance designed for most micro & small enterprises which could not get loan from Bank before and also has a big micro lending operation. The bank was the first partner bank in the China Development Bank Microfinance Project starting in 2005.

By the end of September 2011, TZB has more than 62,000 clients that have loans outstanding, average loan amount was 436,200 RMB, among which loans under 1 million RMB took up 92.68% of loan number and 55.93% of loan outstanding.

== Literature ==
- KPMG "Chinas Commercial Banks: Opportunity knocks?"
- The Banker
- China Development Bank
