= Bank of Nanjing =

Chinese commercial bank

Bank of Nanjing Co. Ltd.

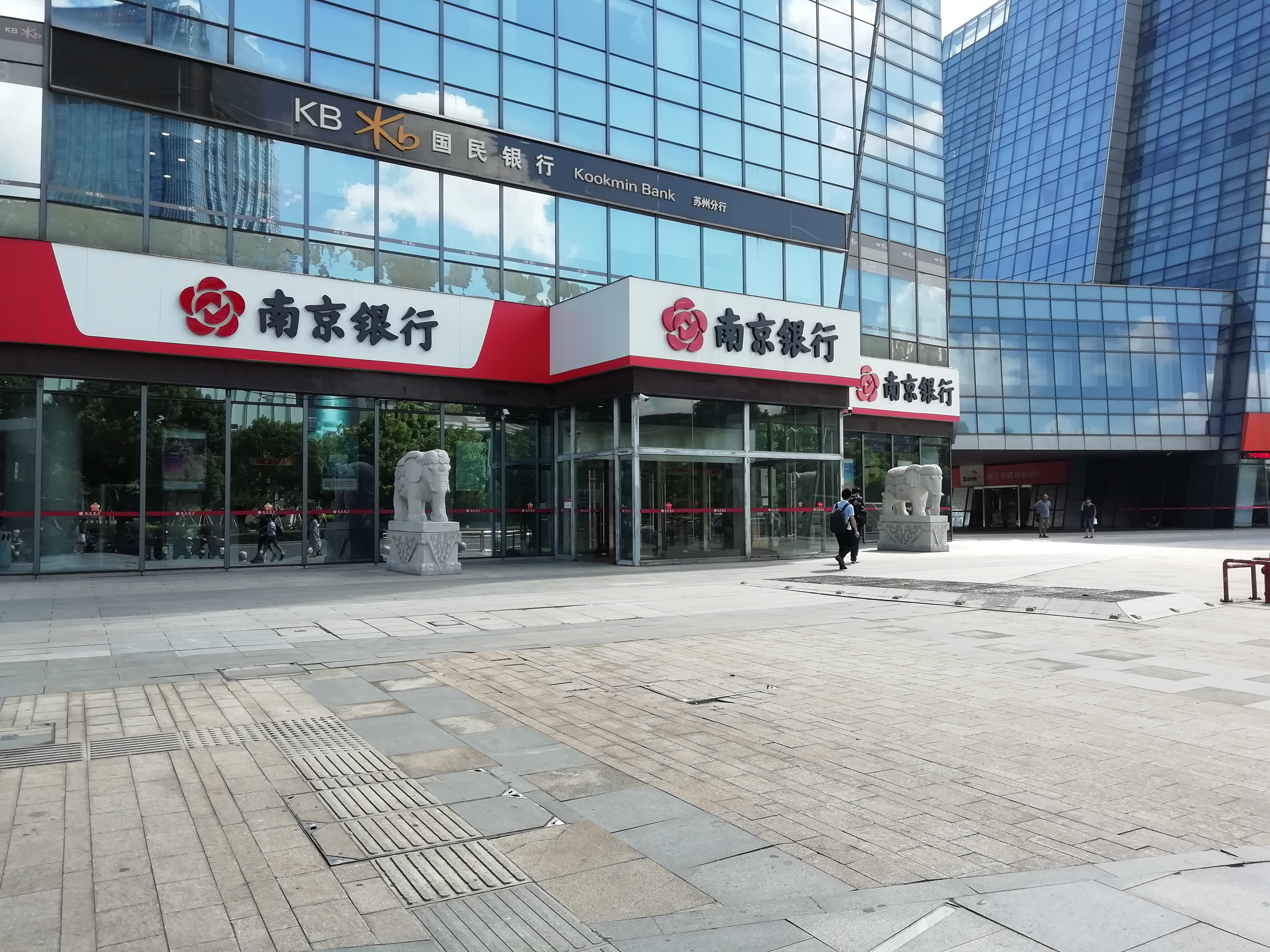
- Branch in Suzhou
- Native name: 南京银行股份有限公司
- Formerly: Nanjing City Commercial Bank
- Company type: Public
- Traded as: SSE: 601009
- Industry: Financial services
- Founded: 6 February 1996; 30 years ago
- Headquarters: Nanjing, Jiangsu, China
- Key people: Xie Ning (Chairman); Zhu Gang (President)
- Operating income: ▲CN¥45.16 billion (2023)
- Net income: ▲CN¥18.63 billion (2023)
- Total assets: ▲CN¥2.23 trillion (2023)
- Total equity: ▲CN¥172.59 billion (2023)
- Owners: BNP Paribas (15.24%) (2023)
- Number of employees: 16,342 (2023)
- Capital ratio: Tier 1 11.40% (2023)
- Website: www.njcb.com.cn

Bank of Nanjing (NJBK; Chinese: 南京银行; pinyin: Nánjīng Yínháng) is a Chinese joint-stock commercial bank founded in 1996 and headquartered in Nanjing, Jiangsu. Its largest single shareholder is BNP Paribas.

== Background ==
Nanjing City Commercial Bank (NCCB) was founded in 1996 through a merger of 40 urban credit cooperatives in the city of Nanjing.

In November 2001, the International Finance Corporation (IFC) acquired a 15% stake in NCCB for US$27 million. The funding would be used to strengthen the bank's capital base and institutional capacity.

In October 2005, BNP Paribas acquired a 19.2% stake in NCCB for an undisclosed price which included IFC's stake.

In March 2007, NCCB was renamed to Bank of Nanjing as part of the bank's development and modernisation. In July 2007, NJBK held its initial public offering becoming a listed company on the Shanghai Stock Exchange. BNP Paribas which had backed the offering diluted its stake to 12.7% afterwards.

NJBK had become a major player in China's government bond market. In 2013, NJBK established an asset management firm named Xin Yuan Asset Management which became its primary partner in packaging loans as investments. Instead of traditional loans, Xin Yuan would create a high-yield investment product that NJBK marketed to its own retail customers. From 2013 to 2015, NJBK's assets nearly doubled.

In September 2021, the People's Bank of China and the China Banking and Insurance Regulatory Commission added NJBK to its Systemically important financial institution list.
