= Shenzhen City Commercial Bank =

Commercial bank in Shenzhen, China

Shenzhen Commercial Bank
- Company type: Public
- Industry: Finance
- Founded: 1995
- Headquarters: Shenzhen, China
- Products: Financial services
- Website: www.szcb.com

Shenzhen City Commercial Bank (simplified Chinese: 深圳市商业银行; traditional Chinese: 深圳市商業銀行; pinyin: Shēnzhènshì Shāngyè Yínháng) is a commercial bank based in Shenzhen in the People's Republic of China.
