= Bank of Ningbo =

Chinese bank based in Ningbo, Zhejiang province, China

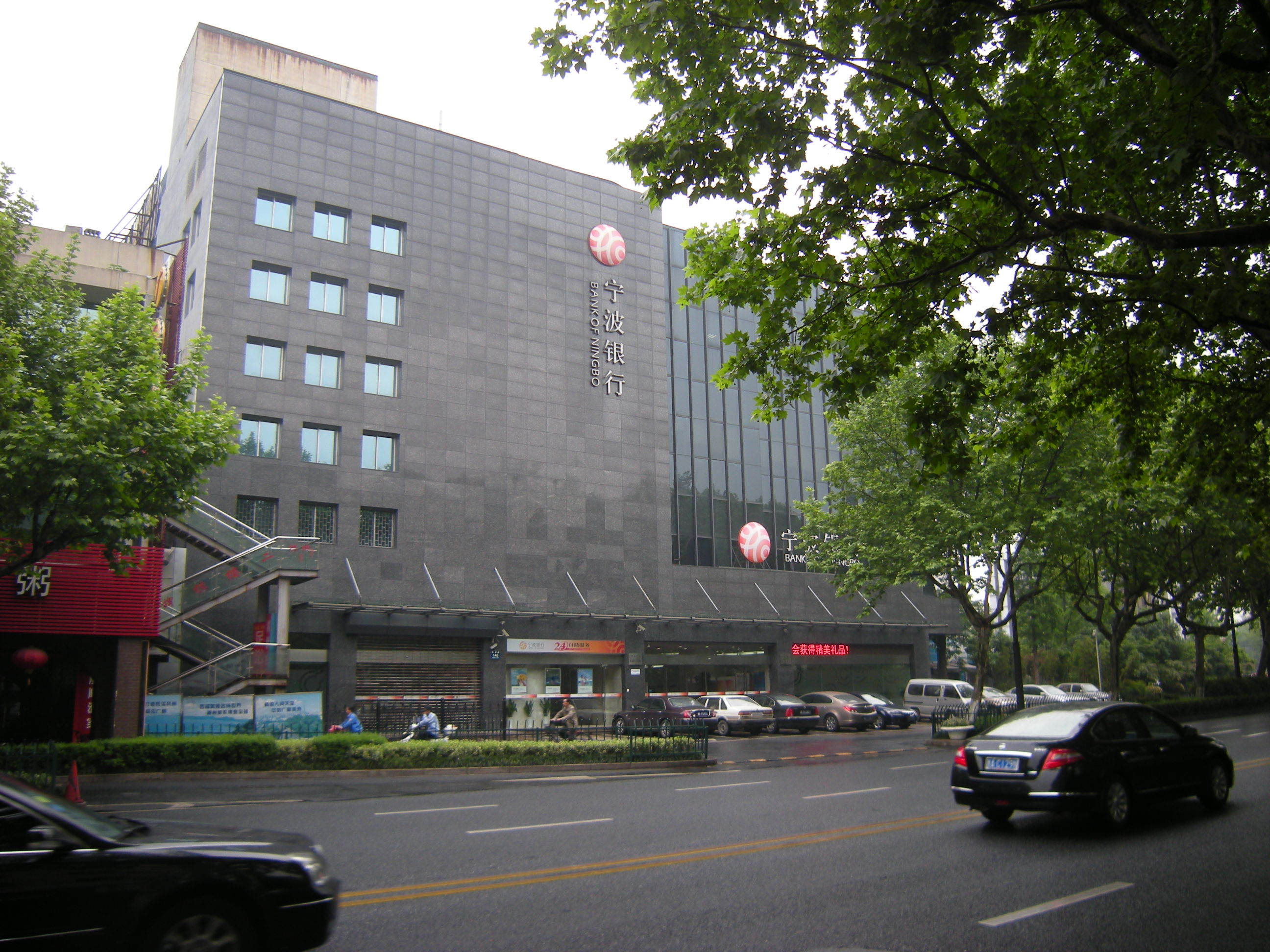
- Branch in Hangzhou
- Company type: public; limited liability
- Traded as: SZSE: 002142 (ordinary); SZSE: 140001 (preference)
- Industry: Financial services
- Founded: April 10, 1997
- Headquarters: Ningbo, China
- Area served: Zhejiang Province; Jiangsu Province; Shanghai, Beijing & Shenzhen
- Key people: Lu Huayu (Chairman)
- Revenue: ▲CN¥19.516 billion (2015)
- Operating income: ▲CN¥8,018 billion (2015)
- Net income: ▲CN¥6,544 billion (2015)
- Total assets: ▲CN¥716.465 billion (2015)
- Total equity: ▲CN¥45.001 billion (2015)
- Owner: Ningbo Development and Investment Group - Affiliate of Ningbo Government (21.38%); OCBC Bank (20.00%); Youngor Group (11.64%); Huamao Group (5.85%)
- Capital ratio: ▼9.03% (CET1)
- Footnotes / references in a consolidated basis; please see the report for their definition of revenue, operating income in Chinese accounting standards

Bank of Ningbo Co., Ltd.
- Simplified Chinese: 宁波银行股份有限公司
- Traditional Chinese: 寧波銀行股份有限公司
Transcriptions
Standard Mandarin
- Hanyu Pinyin: Níngbō YínHáng Gǔfèn Yǒuxiàn Gōngsī

Bank of Ningbo
- Simplified Chinese: 宁波银行
- Traditional Chinese: 寧波銀行
Transcriptions
Standard Mandarin
- Hanyu Pinyin: Níngbō YínHáng

Bank of Ningbo Co., Ltd. is a Chinese city-based commercial bank headquartered in Ningbo, Zhejiang. As of December 31, 2015, The company had 30 branches (Chinese: 分行, each branches itself managed several locations as Chinese: 支行) in several cities in Yangtze River Delta area, in Ningbo, Shanghai, Nanjing, Hangzhou, Suzhou, Wuxi and other cities in Zhejiang Province (such as Wenzhou), as well as in Beijing and Shenzhen.

Since January 2008, Bank of Ningbo has become one of the constituents in Shenzhen Stock Exchange Component Index (originally top 40 companies, now top 500 companies). As at 11 November 2016 Bank of Ningbo is a constituent of SZSE 100 Index and CSI 100 Index.

== History ==
It was founded in 1997 as the Ningbo Commercial Bank. In 2007, it changed its name to Bank of Ningbo and listed its shares on the Shenzhen Stock Exchange.

In 2006, Singapore's OCBC Bank first acquired a 12.2% stake in Ningbo Commercial Bank and subsequently raised its stake in the renamed Bank of Ningbo to 20% in 2014.

In August 2008, the bank relocated several major departments from Ningbo to Shanghai.
