= Bank of Hangzhou =

Chinese commercial bank

Bank of Hangzhou Co. Ltd.

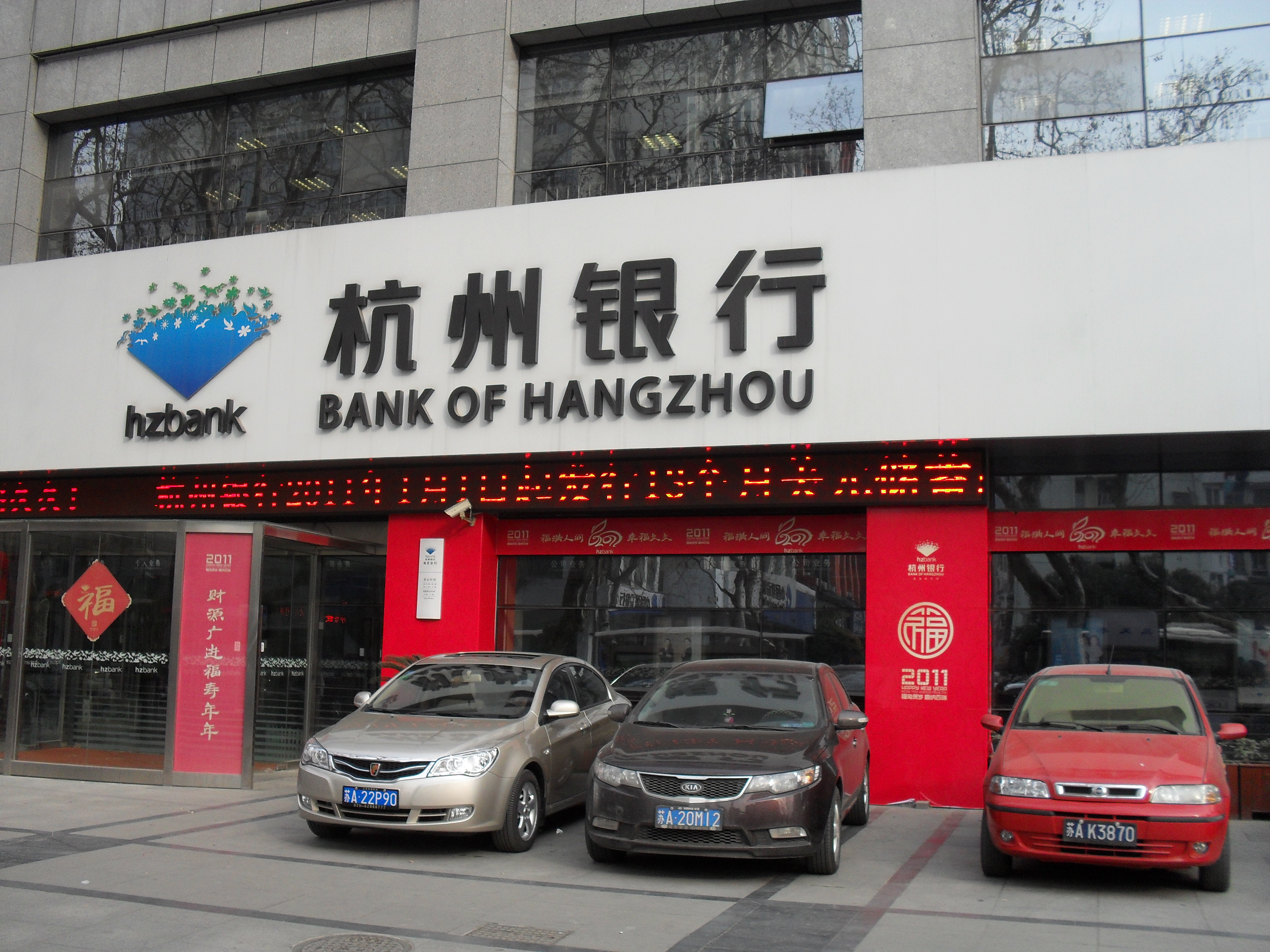
- Branch in Nanjing
- Native name: 杭州银行股份有限公司
- Formerly: Hangzhou City Commercial Bank
- Type: Public
- Traded as: SSE: 600926; CSI Midcap 200
- Industry: Financial services
- Founded: 26 September 1996; 29 years ago
- Headquarters: Hangzhou, Zhejiang, China
- Key people: Song Jianbin (Chairman); Yu Liming (President)
- Operating income: ▲CN¥35.02 billion (2023)
- Net income: ▲CN¥14.38 billion (2023)
- Total assets: ▲CN¥1.84 trillion (2023)
- Total equity: ▲CN¥111.29 billion (2023)
- Owners: Commonwealth Bank (5.56%) (2023)
- Number of employees: 13,756 (2023)
- Capital ratio: Tier 1 9.64% (2023)
- Website: www.hzbank.com.cn

Bank of Hangzhou (BOH; Chinese: 杭州银行; pinyin: Hángzhōu Yínháng) is a Chinese joint-stock commercial bank founded in 1996 and headquartered in Hangzhou, Zhejiang.

== Background ==
Hangzhou City Commercial Bank (HCCB) was founded on 26 September 1996. The bank mostly operated in Zhejiang province.

In April 2005, Commonwealth Bank acquired a 19.9% stake in HCCB for A$100 million. The deal allowed Commonwealth Bank to have representation on the board and would also provide technical support to HCCB.

In December 2006, Asian Development Bank (ADB) acquired a 5% stake in HCCB for US$30 million. In 2014, ADB would sell its entire stake to China Life Insurance Company.

In July 2008, HCCB was renamed to Bank of Hangzhou.

BOH has been stated to use a business model similar to Silicon Valley Bank where it caters to the unique financing needs of tech SMEs given Hangzhou's location for tech startups such as the Alibaba Group. In 2009, BOH launched a dedicated subsidiary to finance tech SMEs. In 2010, BOH expanded to Zhongguancun becoming one of the first to support SMEs to raise capital via equity pledge financing on the National Equities Exchange and Quotations. In 2016 BOH launched a specialized technology finance department. In 2021, BOH opened a branch at the Shanghai Science and Technology Innovation Center.

In October 2016, BOH held its initial public offering (IPO) by becoming a publicly listed company on the Shanghai Stock Exchange. The IPO was smaller than its original targeted size and raised 3.8 billion yuan. Commonwealth Bank was prevented from selling its BOH shares for three years until 2019.

In March 2022, Commonwealth Bank sold 10% of its stake in BOH for A$1.8 billion to the Hangzhou city government. Its stake was reduced to 5.56% and it earnt a post-tax gain of A$340 million. There were concerns that Chinese regulators would deliberately slow regulatory approvals and the release of funds as it took over two years for Commonwealth Bank to get approval to sell its stake in BoComm Life Insurance Company to Mitsui Sumitomo Insurance Group. However the BOH sale only took four months to be approved. It was speculated that geopolitical factors played a role and since the sell was to the Hangzhou city government, it was much easier to approve the process.
