= UBS China =

UBS's securities firm in China

UBS Securities Co., Ltd.
- Company type: joint venture
- Industry: Financial services
- Predecessor: Beijing Securities
- Founded: 2006
- Headquarters: Beijing, China
- Area served: Mainland China
- Services: Investment banking; Brokerage; Asset management
- Revenue: ▲CN¥1.232 billion (2015)
- Operating income: ▲CN¥388 million (2015)
- Net income: ▲CN¥301 million (2015)
- Total assets: ▲CN¥3.731 billion (2015)
- Total equity: ▲CN¥1.886 billion (2015)
Owner
UBS Group	(51%)
Beijing SAM	(33%)
Guangdong Comm. Group	(14.01%)
China Guodian	(1.99%)
- Parent: UBS Group

Chinese name
- Simplified Chinese: 瑞银证券有限责任公司
- Traditional Chinese: 瑞銀證券有限責任公司
Transcriptions

UBS Securities
- Simplified Chinese: 瑞银证券
- Traditional Chinese: 瑞銀證券
Transcriptions
- Website: www.ubssecurities.com

UBS Securities Co., Ltd. is the investment bank and brokerage firm of the Swiss bank UBS with offices in many countries, among them China. Its Chinese arm is a joint-venture according to the restrictions of foreign investments in China, especially in the financial sector. Since 2018, it is a subsidiary of the Swiss bank UBS.

== History ==
In 2006, China Jianyin Investment (an indirect subsidiary of the State Council) and Beijing Guoxiang Asset Management (an asset management subsidiary of the Beijing Municipal People's Government) established the firm after the financial difficulties of Beijing Securities. UBS and the International Finance Corporation bought a combined 24.99% share of the enterprise in 2007, under the laws governing Sino-foreign joint ventures. COFCO Group and State Development & Investment Corporation (SDIC) also acquired part ownership from China Jianyin Investment.

The firm began operations in May of 2007. It underwrote BYD Company, Pang Da Automobile Trade and other publicly traded companies in their IPO. In 2011, China Guodian acquired the SDIC's 14% stake and China Jianyin Investment sold its remaining 14.01% stake to its parent company, Central Huijin Investment, which was in turn acquired in 2013 by the Guangdong Provincial People's Government-owned Guangdong Provincial Communication Group. One year later, UBS increased its stake from 20% to 24.99% by acquiring International Finance Corporation's share.

UBS Securities became a subsidiary of UBS in 2015. The latter company increased its share to 51% by acquiring additional stake from China Guodian and COFCO Group. Beijing Guoxiang Asset Management's stake in UBS Securities is now (as of 2019) owned by sister company Beijing State-owned Assets Management. Yu Xugang and his coauthors called UBS Securities "the first foreign-invested fully-licensed securities firm in China".

== See also ==
- CSC Financial, a sister company
- Securities industry in China
