= China Securities =

China Securities may refer to:

- Securities industry in China
- China Securities Regulatory Commission, Chinese regulator
- China Securities Journal, a Chinese periodical
- China Securities Co., Ltd., now known as CSC Financial, Chinese company
- China Investment Securities, successor of China Southern Securities, Chinese company
- China Securities Index Co., Ltd., a Chinese company which provides stock market data
  - CSI 300 Index
