= CSC Financial =

State-owned investment bank in China

CSC Financial Co., Ltd.
- Trade name: China Securities
- Company type: Public
Traded as
SSE: 601066	(A share)
SEHK: 6066	(H share)
- ISIN: CNE100002B89
- Industry: Financial services
- Predecessor: China Securities Co., Ltd.
- Founded: 2005
- Founder: CITIC Securities; Jianyin Investment
- Headquarters: Beijing, China
- Area served: Mainland China, Hong Kong
- Services: Investment banking; Brokerage; Asset management
- Revenue: ▼CN¥ 29.49 billion (2022)
- Operating income: ▼CN¥ 9.99 billion (2022)
- Net income: ▼CN¥ 7.51 billion (2022)
- Total assets: ▲CN¥ 509.96 billion (2022)
- Total equity: ▲CN¥ 93.29 billion (2022)
- Owner: Beijing Financial Holdings Group (34.61%); Central Huijin (30.76%); CITIC Securities (4.94%)
- Number of employees: 12,294 (2022)
- Website: www.csc108.com
- Footnotes / references In a consolidated basis In Chinese accounting standards

CSC Financial Co., Ltd.
- Simplified Chinese: 中信建投证券股份有限公司
- Traditional Chinese: 中信建投證券股份有限公司
- Literal meaning: CITIC – Jianyin Investment Securities Company Limited by Shares
Transcriptions
Standard Mandarin
- Hanyu Pinyin: Zhōngxìn jiàntóu zhèngquàn gǔfèn yǒuxiàn gōngsī

China Securities
- Simplified Chinese: 中信建投证券
- Traditional Chinese: 中信建投證券
Transcriptions
Standard Mandarin
- Hanyu Pinyin: Zhōngxìn jiàntóu zhèngquàn

CSC Financial Co., Ltd. trading as China Securities, is a Chinese investment bank and brokerage firm established by CITIC Securities and China Jianyin Investment in 2005 in a 60–40 ratio, as a successor of bankrupted China Securities Co., Ltd. (CSC). However, the firm now majority owned by Jianyin Investment's parent company Central Huijin Investment and an asset managing subsidiary of Beijing Municipal People's Government.

The company registered in Hong Kong as a foreign incorporated company as China Securities Finance Co., Ltd. on 28 July 2016 and CSC Financial Co., Ltd. on 20 October, the latter was used in the IPO of CSC's H share. An unrelated company registered the name China Securities Co., Ltd. in Hong Kong in 2014 in order to prospecting the chance that CSC bought back the name. The unrelated company was filed for struck off for dormant (and would be dissolved) by Hong Kong's Companies Register using the power of Chapter 622 Section 745 2.(b) of Hong Kong Law in September 2016.

== History ==
=== [old] China Securities Co., Ltd. (1992–2005) ===
logo of old China Securities

The predecessor of CSC Financial Co., Ltd. was incorporated in 1992 as China Securities Co., Ltd. (CSC) (Chinese: 华夏证券; pinyin: Huáxià zhèngquàn; lit. 'Huaxia Securities'). Huaxia Securities established a subsidiary in Hong Kong as China Securities (International) Limited in 1994 (the stake was at first held by Huaxia Securities' chairman Shao Chun (Chinese: 邵淳) and CEO Deng Xi (Chinese: 邓其) as proxies; China Securities (International) became dormant since 2010).

As of 31 December 2004, state-owned enterprise Beijing State-owned Assets Management Co., Ltd. owned 29.82% stake of Huaxia Securities. The enterprise, which was a subsidiary of Beijing Municipal People's Government, also owned 33.87% stake of Beijing Securities, 20.07% stake of the Bank of Beijing, 46.67% stake of Beijing International Trust, 40.725% stake of China Asset Management (Chinese: 华夏基金管理; lit. 'Huaxia Fund Management') and the predecessor of insurance company Old Mutual – Guodian for 50.00% stake, making the enterprise owned several financial and non-financial associate companies as a mega conglomerate. However, Hua Xia Bank, was partially owned by Shougang Corporation (a direct subsidiary of State-owned Assets Supervision and Administration Commission (SASAC) of Beijing Municipal Government at that time) for 14.29% and other companies instead.

However, after several scandal which the staff illegally made investment without the consent of their client, Huaxia Securities went bankrupted (as in 2016 the firm was still being liquidated).

=== [new] China Securities Co., Ltd. (2005–) ===
A new firm with the same English trading name China Securities but different Chinese name (Chinese: 中信建投证券; lit. 'CITIC Jianyin Securities') was established by CITIC Securities and China Jianyin Investment in 2005 and receiving the client from the old firm, but did not bear any legal responsibility of the old firm.

In 2010, as CITIC Securities also had their own license, CITIC Securities was requested by China Securities Regulatory Commission to sell all but one subsidiary, including China Securities Co., Ltd. (CITIC Securities was allowed to keep at most kept 7% stake of CSC; CITIC Securities (Shandong) was kept as subsidiary, Kington Securities was put on the market), which 45% stake was acquired by Beijing State-owned Capital Operation and Management (BSCOMC, Chinese: 北京国有资本经营管理中心) for CN¥7.290 billion and 8% stake by Century Golden Resources Group for CN¥1.296 billion through public offering on Beijing Financial Assets Exchange, making SASAC of Beijing Municipal Government returned as the largest shareholder. In the same year China Jianyin Investment transferred the stake its held to Jianyin Investment's parent company Central Huijin Investment, a subsidiary of the State Council of the People's Republic of China. In 2011 China Securities was reincorporated as a "company limited by shares". (Chinese: 股份有限公司) In 2016 Century Golden Resources Group sold most of its stake to Shannan Jinyuan (4.92%) and Shanghai Shangyan (2.47%).

In 2007 China Securities acquired the remaining stake of China Futures Co., Ltd. from other shareholders.

On 12 July 2012 China Securities re-established its Hong Kong subsidiary as China Securities (International) Finance Holding. The Hong Kong-based holding company itself also forming several subsidiaries.

According to the company, China Securities was ranked 4th by underwriting 135 companies in National Equities Exchange and Quotations.

In November 2016, China Securities started the global offering for its new H shares that would be floated on the Stock Exchange of Hong Kong. The Price was set at HK$ 6.81. Cornerstone investors subscribed 57.38% of the H shares, which equal to 9.47% total share capital of CSC. The largest H share shareholder was Glasslake Holdings, an indirect wholly owned subsidiary of CITIC Limited, which was the largest shareholder of CITIC Securities.

In 2018, its A shares started to trade in the Shanghai Stock Exchange. The company became a constituent of SSE 50, the blue chip index of that exchange in 2019.

== Name ==
On 20 October 2016 China Securities registered its English name in Hong Kong's Companies Register as CSC Financial Co., Ltd.. Its original English trading name which was used in mainland China, China Securities Co., Ltd., was already registered by others in Hong Kong on 21 May 2014 (but with different Chinese name Chinese: 中國證券國際), as well as the present of unrelated company China Securities Holdings (Chinese: 中國証券控股), a small brokerage firm which used the name since 27 February 2012. Despite both companies were now being dissolved: China Securities Holdings ceased business on 31 December 2012 and the former staff was suspended by the Securities and Futures Commission of Hong Kong due to poor management.

CSC Financial also used China Securities Finance Co., Ltd. as the registered name in Hong Kong from July to October 2016. However, it was in fact the trading name of another financial services company of the mainland China.

The predecessor of CSC Financial, China Securities aka Huaxia Securities, was named after Huaxia.

The new Chinese name of China Securities since 2005, literally CITIC – Jianyin Investment Securities, were in fact came from China International Trust and Investment Corporation (the founder of CITIC Securities) and China Construction Bank (the short name of the bank in pinyin was Jiàn yín; China Jianyin Investment was a spin-off of Construction Bank).

== Subsidiaries ==
As of 31 December 2015

- China Capital Management Co., Ltd. (100%)
- China Fund Management Co., Ltd. (55%)
- China Futures Co., Ltd. (100%)
- China Securities (International) Finance Holding Co., Ltd. (100%)

== Financial data ==
in a consolidated financial statements (in CN¥)
Year	Revenue	Profit	Assets	Equity
2005	39 million	(195 million)	9.243 billion	▼2.504 billion
2006 (restated)	▲1.690 billion	▲315 million	▲23.295 billion	▲2.820 billion
2007	▲7.741 billion	▲2.450 billion	▲63.794 billion	▲5.365 billion
2008	▼4.130 billion	▼1.739 billion	▼35.818 billion	▼5.214 billion
2009	▲6.082 billion	▲2.617 billion	▲66.005 billion	▲7.310 billion
2010	▼5.681 billion	▼2.161 billion	▲68.104 billion	▲9.426 billion
2011	▼4.000 billion	▼1.212 billion	▼48.506 billion	▲10.500 billion
2012	▲4.430 billion	▲1.342 billion	▲49.885 billion	▲11.935 billion
2013	▲5.650 billion	▲1.787 billion	▲67.410 billion	▲13.091 billion
2014	▲8.587 billion	▲3.407 billion	▲123.406 billion	▲16.669 billion
2015	▲19.011 billion	▲8.639 billion	▲183.188 billion	▲30.106 billion
2016				

== Rankings ==
2015 ranking within mainland China:

- by total assets: 11th
- by net assets: 14th
- by operating income: 10th
- by net profit: 10th
- by return of equity: 15th
- by net revenue of asset management (in group basis): 12th
- by net revenue of investment banking (in group basis): 2nd
- by net revenue of underwriting and sponsorship (in group basis): 3rd
- by numbers of shares underwritten (in group basis): 2nd
- by value of underwritten shares (in group basis): 3rd

== See also ==
- UBS Securities, another company owned by Beijing Municipal People's Government
- China Investment Securities, wholly owned subsidiary of China International Capital Corporation, founded by China Jianyin Investment
- Securities industry in China
