= Xie Ping =

Chinese financial policymaker

Xie Ping (Chinese: 謝平; born 15 July 1955 in Wenzhou, Zhejiang) is a Chinese financial policymaker. A former senior official of the People's Bank of China and Deputy General Manager of China Investment Corporation, he has more recently been a professor at the PBC School of Finance at Tsinghua University. He was the first General Manager of Central Huijin Investment after that entity was established in 2003, while Guo Shuqing was chairman.

== Life ==
Xie Ping was admitted to the Department of Economics of Southwestern University of Finance and Economics in 1982. After receiving his master's degree there in 1985, he was assigned to work in the Investigation and Research Office of the Head Office of the People's Bank of China (PBC). Nine months later, he entered Renmin University of China to study for a PhD in economics. After graduating in 1988, Xie Ping returned to the PBC where he successively worked in the Comprehensive Planning Department, Interest Rate Savings Management Department, Policy Research Office, and Non-Bank Financial Institutions Department. In May 1997, he was promoted to Director of the Non-Bank Financial Institutions Department, and in November, President and Party Secretary of the PBC branch in Hunan. In August 1998, Xie returned to the PBC head office and served as Director of the Research Bureau and Director of the Financial Research Institute of the People's Bank of China. In October 2003, he became director of the PBC's Financial Stability Bureau.

In September 2004, Xie Ping became General Manager of Central Huijin Investment. During his term of office, he actively promoted the restructuring of China's banking and financial system, through which Huijin became a shareholder in major financial institutions. He gained a reputation as a forceful restructurer in cases such as Galaxy Holdings, Everbright Group, Guotai Junan, Shenyin & Wanguo. Xie Ping stated that "Huijin has no administrative purpose and should exercise shareholder responsibilities as a company and a market participant".

In April 2010, Xie Ping was suddenly dismissed from his post as general manager of Huijin. China Investment Corporation (CIC), by then Huijin's parent company, did not explain the reasons for the removal. Media reported that Xie Ping may have engaged in inappropriate behavior regarding the appointment of directors to financial institutions.

Upon leaving Central Huijin, Xie Ping was appointed as CIC's deputy chief investment officer, assisting CIC General Manager Gao Xiqing in managing overseas investment business, supervising overseas direct investment projects, and taking charge of the special investment department. He left CIC in September 2015.

Xie Ping has been a prolific contributor to research and debates about China's financial sector. His books include China's Monetary Policy Shifting to a Market Economy (Chinese: 轉向市場經濟的中國貨幣政策), Challenges of China's Monetary Policy in the New Century (Chinese: 新世紀中國貨幣政策的挑戰), and Research on China's Financial Corruption: From Qualitative to Quantitative (Chinese: 中國金融腐敗研究：從定性到定量, co-authored with Chen Lei). In 1996, 2000, and 2003 respectively, these books won the 4th, 9th and 11th iterations of the Economic Science Award named after Sun Yefang, one of China's highest and most prestigious honors in the field of economics. He also received the inaugural Sun Yefang Financial Innovation Award in 2015 for Internet Finance in China: Introduction and Practical Approaches (with Zou Chuanwei and Liu Haier).

Xie Ping also serves as a professor and doctoral supervisor at the PBC School of Finance; an adjunct professor at Southwestern University of Finance and Economics, Renmin University of China, Nankai University, Nanjing University, Wuhan University, and other institutions; an editorial board member of the Economic Research journal; and an economics professor at the Chinese Academy of Social Sciences. In late 2016, he joined the board of trustees for the Public Confidence Committee of Caixin Media.

== See also ==
- Liu Hongru
- Wang Jianxi
- Guo Shuqing
