= China International Capital Corporation =

Chinese company

China International Capital Corporation Limited
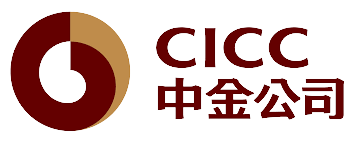
- Native name: 中国国际金融股份有限公司
- Type: Public; State-owned enterprise
- Traded as: SEHK: 3908; SSE: 601995
- Industry: Banking, Financial services
- Founded: 1995; 31 years ago
- Headquarters: China World Office 2, 1 Jianguomenwai Avenue, Chaoyang District, Beijing, China
- Key people: Chen Liang (Chairman)
- Products: Investment banking, Equities, FICC, Asset management, Private Equity Investment, Wealth management, Research
- Number of employees: 13,557 (2021)
- Website: www.cicc.com

China International Capital Corporation Limited (CICC; 中国国际金融股份有限公司) is a Chinese partially state-owned multinational investment management and financial services company. Founded in 1995, CICC provides investment banking, securities and investment management services to corporations, institutions and individuals worldwide.

Headquartered in Beijing, CICC has over 200 branches in mainland China and offices in Hong Kong, Singapore, New York City, London, San Francisco, Frankfurt and Tokyo.

== History ==
On July 31, 1995, CICC was incorporated by China Construction Bank, Morgan Stanley, China National Investment and Guaranty Co Ltd, GIC, and the Mingly Corporation, as the first Sino-foreign joint venture investment bank. At the time of CICC's incorporation, China Construction Bank and Morgan Stanley were its largest shareholders, with 42.5% and 35% of interests, respectively.

In 1997, CICC established its first overseas subsidiary in Hong Kong, through which CICC became the first Chinese investment bank conducting securities underwriting business in Hong Kong. In 1997, CICC completed its first overseas initial public offering project, the IPO of China Mobile on the Hong Kong Stock Exchange, which marked the beginning of the restructuring and overseas listing of large state-owned enterprises directly under the State Council of China. It was also the largest IPO in Asia as well as the largest IPO of China-based companies ever up until the end of 1997.

In 2004, China Construction Bank transferred its equity interest to China Jianyin Investment, which later transferred that to China Central Huijin, a wholly owned subsidiary of China Investment Corporation. In 2010, Morgan Stanley sold its holdings to TPG, KKR, GIC and Great Eastern. CICC established its FICC division, and was one of the earliest investment banks to conduct fixed income business in China.

In 2015, CICC was converted into a joint stock company with limited liability whose top three shareholders were Huijin, GIC and TPG. In November 2015, CICC completed its own IPO on the Hong Kong Stock Exchange.

In 2016 CICC acquired China Investment Securities from Central Huijin in an all-share deal.

In 2017, CICC acquired a majority stake (50+%) in US KraneShares, a leading exchange-traded fund provider that focuses on Chinese listed companies, with its biggest fund (KWEB) focused on Chinese Internet companies. In 2017, giant Chinese internet company, Tencent acquired a 5% stake in CICC.

On 4 January 2023, Bloomberg News reported that CICC was cutting travel perks for its senior bankers as part of the policy in line of the common prosperity agenda promoted by Chinese leader Xi Jinping. In May 2024, Bloomberg News reported CICC was preparing to demote some of its senior staff and cut their salaries, and create a new performance-rating plan for its bankers; 5% of its employees would be in the top group, 45% in the second group, 20% in the third group, 20% in the fourth group, and 10% in the bottom group. Those in the fourth group would get a small salary cut while those in the bottom group would be demoted a full rank. It also reported the base salaries of CICC bankers in mainland China would be cut by up to 25%. Bloomberg News reported in July 2024 that since the start of Xi's common prosperity drive, CICC has moved from a more market-based vision and "cast aside the hard-charging ways of Wall Street", following one closer that of the Chinese Communist Party (CCP). It wrote that one-third of CICC employees were now CCP members.

== Shareholding Structure ==
As of October 31, 2021, its shareholding structure was as follows:

- 40.17% Central Huijin Investment Ltd.
- 30.74% HKSCC Nominees Limited
- 8.26% Haier Group (Qingdao) Financial Holdings Ltd.
- 4.49% Alibaba Group Holding Limited
- 4.48% Tencent Holdings Limited
- 2.64% China National Investment and Guaranty Corporation
- 0.38% Hong Kong Securities Clearing Company Limited
- 0.32% China Reform Investment Co., Ltd.
- 0.32% China Structural Reform Fund Corporation Limited
- 0.29% Abu Dhabi Investment Authority
- 7.92% Other Public Shareholders (A+H shares)

== Notable former employees ==
- Wang Qishan – Vice President of China
- Wu Jinglian – Chinese economist
- Xu Xiaonian – Professor of Economics and Finance at China Europe International Business School
- Wang Jianxi - accounting specialist and financial reformer
- Bei Duoguang – CEO of JPMorgan First Capital Securities
- Ding Wei – Head of Temasek China
- Fang Fenglei – Former chairman of Goldman Sachs Gao Hua Securities and Chairman of Hopu Investment Management
- Ha Jiming – Vice Chairman, China of Goldman Sachs Private Wealth Management
- Jiang Guorong – Vice Chairman of UBS Asia
- Jin Liqun – President of Asian Infrastructure Investment Bank
- David X. Li – Chinese statistician
- Marshall Nicholson – Hong Kong investment banker with BOC International and Nomura Holdings
- Wu Shangzhi – chairman and Managing Partner of CDH Investments
- Levin Zhu – child of Zhu Rongji, a former Premier of the People's Republic of China
- Zhu Yong Roger, former Chairman CICC, founder and CEO of HuiZhi Capital
- Peter Nolan, independent non-executive director

== See also ==
- Economy of China
- Banking in China
- Securities industry in China
- CITIC Group
