= Securities industry in China =

Securities industry in China is an article on the securities industry in mainland China.

== History ==
- 1995, China's first joint venture investment bank – China International Capital Corp (CICC) was established, shareholders included Morgan Stanley International.
- March 2002, Changjiang Securities and BNP Paribas signed the Sino-foreign joint venture securities companies' framework agreement, establishing the first joint-venture securities company after China entered the WTO.
- June 2002, China Securities Regulatory Commission issued the "Establishment of Securities Companies with Foreign Equity Participation Rules", setting the maximum stake at 33% for foreign joint venture partners. The measure was implemented on July 1, 2002.
- 2004, Goldman Sachs Group joined with Gao Hua Securities to establish a joint venture Goldman Sachs Gao Hua Securities in order to enter China market.
- September 2005, UBS Restructuring of Beijing Securities Project, preparation of UBS Securities was approved by the State Council. This was the first time for mainland to allow foreign institutions to own the management rights of mainland securities companies. This was also the first case for foreign institute to own the mainland securities license.
- September 2006, China Securities Regulatory Commission (CSRC) announced a suspension on approval of new securities companies (including foreign-invested securities companies) and commercial offices.
- May 2007, in the Second Sino-US Strategic Economic Dialogue (SED), Chinese Government promised to resume approval of new securities companies and declare a gradual expansion in the business scope of joint venture securities companies before the Third SED.
- December 2007, CSRC announced the resume of approval of Joint-venture securities companies and qualified securities companies can apply to set up.
- July 2007, CSRC announced a new regulatory classification base on securities companies risk managing ability and classified them into A (AAA, AA, A), B (BBB, BB, B), C(CCC, CC, C), D and E 11 classes.
- December 2007, SCRC started to launch business license management on securities companies which indicate that securities companies’ ability on risk management will directly affect their capability in business scope, especially in the innovation business license
- 2007, 17 brokerages received A-class rating, in which 2 of them are AA while 15 are A in rating.
- July 2008, 31 brokerages received A-class rating, in which 10 of them are AA while 21 are A in rating.
- May 26, 2009, CSRC announced a new securities regulatory classification in order to improve the existing classification criteria of securities companies. Under new regulation, 30 brokerages received A-class rating, 58 in B-class rating and 17 in C-class rating.
- China's securities companies are facing more fierce competitors from outside investors. Goldman Sachs, UBS and many other international foreign institutions started to set up joint venture securities companies in China.

== Regulation ==
In mainland China, the China Securities Regulatory Commission is the primary regulator; however, it has delegated certain activities to a self-regulatory organization called the Securities Association of China (SAC).

Mainland China began an IPO sponsor system began in 2004, which is similar to a sponsor system in Hong Kong began in 1999. In order to be publicly listed in China, a prospective listing firm must be sponsored by a securities company (investment bank) and the sponsor must assign sponsor representatives to the listing firm. This In 2012, the SAC took over registration of sponsor representatives. The exam to become a sponsor representative is extremely difficult, with a one percent passing rate, and sponsor representatives have been highly compensated, with $1 million annual salaries in 2010. Despite this, they are viewed as often ineffective.

== Equity share types and foreign investment ==
Mainland shares are known as A-shares and are not typically available for purchase by foreigners. B-shares are available to foreigners, but are reputed to be more risky as they are available for less desirable companies. H-shares are for mainland China companies which are traded on the Hong Kong Stock Exchange.

Institutional investors can apply to become Qualified Foreign Institutional Investors (a program which began in 2002) and then are allowed to buy A-shares; the minimum assets under management was reduced from $5 billion to $500 million in 2012.

On 10 November 2017, China allowed foreign participation up to 51% in securities ventures.

On March 13, 2020, the Securities Regulatory Commission announced that the restriction on foreign shareholding ratio of securities companies will be abolished from April 1, 2020, and qualified foreign investors may submit applications for the establishment of securities companies or change of the actual controller of the companies in accordance with the requirements of laws and regulations, relevant regulations of the SFC and relevant service guidelines in accordance with the law. In the presence of the huge Chinese market, foreign-owned brokerage firms are coming in droves.

== Securities companies classification ==
The China Securities Regulatory Commission in 2021 has classified securities companies as the following:

=== AA ===
- CICC
- China Galaxy Securities
- China Merchants Securities
- CITIC Securities
- CSC Financial
- Essence Securities
- Everbright Securities
- GF Securities
- Guosen Securities
- Guotai Junan
- Huatai Securities
- Industrial Securities
- Orient Securities
- Ping An Securities
- Shenwan Hongyuan

=== A ===
- AVIC Securities
- BOC International
- Beijing Gaohua
- Caida Securities
- Caitong Securities
- Capital Securities
- CDB Securities
- Changjiang Securities
- Credit Suisse Founder
- Dongguan Securities
- Dongxing Securities
- Eastern Fortune
- Founder Securities
- Great Wall Securities
- Guoyuan Securities
- Huaan Securities
- Huachuang Securities
- Hualin Securities
- Huaxin Securities
- Minmetals Securities
- Nanjing Securities
- Open Source Securities
- Shanxi Securities
- Sinolink Securities
- Soochow Securities
- Southwest Securities
- Tianfeng Securities
- Tokai Securities
- UBS Securities, China Branch
- Warburg Securities
- West China Securities
- Western Securities
- Zheshang Securities
- Zhongtai Securities
- Zhongtian Guofu

=== BBB ===
- Bohai Securities
- Caixin Securities
- Central China Securities
- Cinda Securities
- Fed Securities
- Gold Dollar Securities
- Goldman Sachs Gao Hua
- Great Wall Guorui
- Guohai Securities
- Haitong Securities
- HSBC Qianhai
- Huajin Securities
- Hualong Securities
- Huaxing Securities
- Morgan Stanley Huaxin
- Northeast Securities
- Shengang Securities
- Zhongtian Securities

=== BB ===
- Century Securities
- Datong Securities
- East Asia Qianhai
- First Capital Securities
- Guolian Securities
- Guorong Securities
- Hongta Securities
- Huafu Securities
- Intime Securities
- Kyushu Securities
- Minsheng Securities
- Wanlian Securities
- Xiangcai Securities
- Yingda Securities
- Yongxing Securities
- Yuekai Securities

=== CCC ===
- Aijian Securities
- Chase Securities
- China Post Securities
- Guosheng Securities
- Hengtai Securities
- Horizon Securities
- Huarong Securities
- Jianghai Securities
- New Era Securities
- Pacific Securities
- Zhongshan Securities

=== CC ===
- Guodu Securities

=== C ===
- Chuancai Securities

=== D ===
- N-Securities

== Rankings ==
Data as of 31 December 2023

Ranking	Company	Net Profit (RMB 1 billion)
1	CITIC Securities	20.539
2	Huatai Securities	13.036
3	Guotai Junan Securities	9.885
4	China Merchant Securities	8.769
5	China Galaxy Securities	7.884
6	GF Securities	7.863
7	CSC Financial	7.047
8	CICC	6.164
9	Shenwan Hongyuan	5.475
10	Everbright Securities	4.301

Source: Wind Information
