= Xu Xiang =

Investor in China

- 徐翔
- Born: February 1977 (age 49); Ningbo, Zhejiang
- Other names: Xu Qiang (徐强); Big Xu
- Education: High school level
- Occupation: Private placement investor
- Spouse: Ying Ying (应莹)
- Parent(s): Xu Boliang (徐柏良, father); Zheng Suzhen (郑素贞, mother)

Xu Xiang (Chinese: 徐翔; pinyin: Xú Xiáng; born February 1977 in Ningbo, Zhejiang) is a former Chinese private placement investor who served as General Manager of Zexi Investment (泽熙投资), a Chinese investment company. He has been variously called "China's Carl Icahn", "China's Warren Buffett", and "Big Man of Private Placement" (私募一哥) by fellow Chinese investors. On November 1, 2015, Xu Xiang was arrested by the police for insider trading.

In 2017, Xu was sentenced to five and a half years in prison and fined 11 billion yuan.

== Career ==
=== Early life ===
Xu Xiang was born in Ningbo, Zhejiang in 1977. In 1993, Xu skipped the college entrance exams and started investing in stocks, using money from his parents as initial capital at China Galaxy Securities's trading hall on South Liberation Road in Ningbo. He was one of the most prominent investors in Zhejiang before 2000, with several hundred thousand yuan under his management. In 2003, Xu was reported by the media for the first time as the "captain of the Limit-up Kamikaze Squad" (涨停板敢死队总舵主).

=== Shanghai career ===
Xu Xiang moved to Shanghai in 2005. According to Economic Information Daily (经济参考报), Xu arrived at his office at 8.45am every day and often went to bed at around 2am. Studying stocks was his only hobby. He founded Zexi Investment in 2009 with 30 million yuan in registered capital. According to the official website of Zexi Investment, the Zexi No. 1 Fund and the Zexi No. 3 Fund have both increased by about 3,000% since 2010. Xu and his relatives reportedly owned a combined fortune of US$2.2 billion.

In July 2011, it was rumored that Zexi Investment was under investigation by China's regulatory authorities, but Xu denied any illegal operations. In 2015, Xu reportedly manipulated the stock market during the stock market crash that summer.

=== Arrest and trial ===
On November 1, 2015, Xu Xiang was arrested by the police for insider trading. To assist the arrest, the highway patrol sealed off the 35.4 km Hangzhou Bay Bridge for more than 30 minutes. Xinhua, the official news agency in China, released a brief statement after the arrest. When Xu was arrested, he was on his way from Shanghai to Ningbo to celebrate his grandmother's birthday. Xu was later sent to Beijing by the police for interrogation. Some media reported that Xu's arrest was linked to China's anti-corruption campaign.

On April 29, 2016, Xu was formally charged with manipulating the securities market and insider trading.

On January 23, 2017, Xu was sentenced to five and a half years in prison and was fined 11 billion yuan (US$1.6 billion).

On July 9, 2021, Xu was released from prison after serving his five and a half years sentence.

== Family ==
Xu's father, Xu Boliang (徐柏良), was the legal representative of Zetian Investment. His mother, Zheng Suzhen (郑素贞), held some stocks. Her stocks were frozen until November 2017. Xu's family controlled Ningbo Zhongbai (宁波中百), a department store in China. He is married to Ying Ying (应莹).
