= Hongyuan =

Hongyuan may refer to:

- Hongyuan County (红原县), Sichuan
- Hongyuan, Jiangxi (洪源镇), town in Fuliang County
- Hongyuan Securities (宏源证劵), securities firm headquartered in Ürümqi
- Guangdong Hongyuan F.C. (广东宏远足球俱乐部), Chinese football club
