= Boyuan Foundation =

Dormant Chinese think tank

The Boyuan Foundation is a Chinese think tank created in 2007 with the ambition to promote political and economic liberal reforms in China. In 2012, a prominent Beijing-based western journalist wrote that the "Boyuan Foundation exists almost entirely under the radar but may well be the most ambitious, radical and consequential independent panel of advisers in China." In 2014, at a time when it was already paring down its operations, it was described by The Economist as "closely connected to the families of some top leaders and to elite players in the financial system". It has had little if any observable activity in subsequent years.

== Overview ==
The Boyuan Foundation was established in 2007 by He Di, former chairman of UBS China, and Qin Xiao, former chairman of China Merchants Group and China Merchants Bank. UBS provided five million US dollars to the foundation, gaining a seat on its board, while He Di contributed one million dollars of his own money. The foundation established its seat in a renovated courtyard house in central Beijing.

Individuals who have worked for the foundation as researchers and/or published authors have included Ding Xueliang, Lou Jiwei, and Xu Jilin. By 2013, its board members included Wang Jianxi, Gao Xiqing, and Brent Scowcroft.

These and other high-level connections have been reported as providing the foundation some political cover despite vitriolic attacks from the Chinese New Left, and more general political misalignment between the Boyuan Foundation and the Chinese Communist Party.

In addition to more discreet meetings, the Boyuan Foundation was a co-organizer of several high-profile public events. In 2012, it co-organized a "China-Europe Beijing Forum" in partnership with the Institute for Strategic Dialogue. In 2013, it held a flagship event in Beijing, the Chinese Economic Forum, with sponsorship from China Everbright Limited. In the following three years (2014-2016), successive iterations of the Chinese Economic Forum were held in New York in apparent partnership with Peking University.

== See also ==
- Chinese Academy of Social Sciences
- Unirule Institute of Economics
- Gamma Data
