= Wang Jianxi =

Chinese financial policymaker

Wang Jianxi (Chinese: 汪建熙, August 1951 – 1 December 2023), also known in English as Jesse Wang, was a Chinese official who held senior financial sector positions for more than two decades between 1992 and 2013. He was a leading participant in the creation of an accounting and auditing framework in the heyday of the reform and opening up.

== Life ==
Born in Jiangsu, Wang Jianxi graduated from high school in Beijing in 1967 and worked at the Yingchun Machinery Factory in Hulin, Heilongjiang until 1978 during the Cultural Revolution. Following the revival of university education, he then entered Renmin University of China where he was assigned to a major in financial accounting. In 1982, he undertook graduate studies at the Chinese Academy of Fiscal Sciences, for which he spent most of 1983 in Sydney, interning at accounting firm Touche Ross and simultaneously studying at the University of Sydney in the part-time MBA program.

Wang then was the first-ever student to enroll for a PhD in accounting in Communist China, in 1985 at the Academy of Fiscal Sciences under the supervision of Yang Jiwan, and completed it in early 1990 after obtaining China's first-ever CPA certificate (No. 001) in 1987 and working at the China Financial Accounting Consulting Company (Chinese: 中华会计师事务) in the meantime.

In March 1989, while still working on his PhD thesis, Wang started working part-time for the Stock Exchange Executive Council, which had just been created in Beijing to foster stock market development in China. As such, he was a key participant in drafting China's first securities law and in the work that led to formal status being granted to the Shanghai Stock Exchange and Shenzhen Stock Exchange in late 1990.

In September 1991, Wang moved to the United States to learn about the functioning of the National Association of Securities Dealers. He was recalled to China in October 1992 to become the first Chief Accountant of the newly established China Securities Regulatory Commission (CSRC), and from April 1993 also led the CSRC's international department. He was instrumental in the conclusion on 28 April 1994 of a memorandum of understanding between the CSRC and the US Securities and Exchange Commission that paved the ground for the first listings of mainland Chinese companies on US stock markets, starting with Shandong Huaneng Power Development in August 1994.

In 1996, Wang moved to the UK affiliate of Bank of China, then in 2000 went back to the CSRC as Deputy Secretary General until 2002, then Assistant Chairman. He was a Commissioner of the United Nations Compensation Commission from 1999 to 2004. In 2000-2001, together with CSRC Chairman Zhou Xiaochuan, he advocated China's adoption of International Financial Reporting Standards, but could not overcome the reticence of the Ministry of Finance and its Assistant Minister Feng Shuping, in charge of accounting matters at the time.

In 2004, Wang became Vice Chairman of Central Huijin Investment, then in 2007, Deputy General Manager of China Investment Corporation (CIC) which took over Huijin from the People's Bank of China. In the mid-2000s he also served as chairman of China International Capital Corporation (CICC), until being replaced by Li Jiange in early 2008. From 2008 to 2013, he was also a member of the National Committee of the Chinese People's Political Consultative Conference.

Wang Jianxi retired from CIC in March 2013. He subsequently engaged in non-profit activities as board member of the Boyuan Foundation, then as chairman of the Beijing Dalio Public Welfare Foundation, established in 2014 at the initiative of American financier Ray Dalio. He died of illness in Beijing.

== See also ==
- Liu Hongru
- Xie Ping
