= Shenwan Hongyuan =

Chinese state-owned securities brokerage

Shenwan Hongyuan Group Co., Ltd.
- Native name: 申万宏源集团股份有限公司
- Company type: Public; state-owned enterprise
- Traded as: SZSE: 000166 (A share); SEHK: 6806 (H share); China Mainland All
- Industry: Financial services
- Founded: 16 September 1996; 29 years ago
- Headquarters: Urumqi, Xinjiang, People's Republic of China
- Key people: Chu Xiaoming (Chairman)
- Services: Securities brokerage Investment banking Investment management
- Revenue: ▲CN¥33.89 billion (FY 2021)
- Net income: ▲CN¥9.54 billion (FY 2021)
- Total assets: ▲CN¥601.01 billion (FY 2021)
- Total equity: ▲CN¥107.06 billion (FY 2021)
- Owners: China Jianyin Investment (26.34%); Central Huijin Investment (20.05%); HKSCC Nominees (10.00%)
- Number of employees: ▲11,440 (FY 2021)
- Website: www.swhygh.com

Shenwan Hongyuan (Chinese: 申万宏源; pinyin: Shēnwànhóngyuán) is a state-owned securities brokerage company in China which engages in the operation of large-scale comprehensive securities broking and trading services. The company was founded in 1996 and is headquartered in Xinjiang, China.

== History ==
Shenwan Hongyuan is the result of multiple mergers of Chinese securities firms.

The company was first established on 16 September 1996, as Shenyin & Wanguo Securities via a merger between Shenyin Securities and Wanguo Securities. The merger happened in response to the "327 incident" which occurred in 1995. It involved a placement of a huge sell order on three-year government bond futures shortly before the close of trading on 23 February. The transactions were discovered Shanghai Stock Exchange and nullified resulting in Wanguo Securities almost going bankrupt. Wanguo Securities' president, Guan Jinsheng was sentenced to 17 years in jail for market manipulation and his firm was forced to merge with Shenyin Securities.

In 1998, the company advised on the China's biggest asset restructuring deals, which included Shanghai Pharmaceuticals, Shanghai Shenda, Shanghai Sanmao Group, and Nantong Machinery. For both 1998 and 1999 the company ranked first among brokerages in terms of net assets, net profit and stock trading volume.

In January 2015, the company merged with Hongyuan Securities which was the first securities firm to have listed in China. The deal was valued at nearly 40 billion yuan (US$6.3 billion) making it the biggest brokerage merger in China at the time. After the merger, the company was renamed to its current name, Shenwan Hongyuan and also became the second largest brokerage firm in China by market value at the time due to surge in stock price on its trading debut. During this time, Shenwan Hongyuan also moved its headquarters to Urumqi, Xinjiang.

On 26 April 2019, Shenwan Hongyuan held an initial public offering for its H shares on the Hong Kong Stock Exchange. However unlike the strong performance of its A shares in 2015, the performance of its H share price dropped 12% on its trading debut.

== Regulatory issues ==
On 3 September 2020, the Securities and Futures Commission issued a restriction notice to Shenwan Hongyuan to freeze client accounts linked to suspected market manipulation.

In March 2022, the China Securities Regulatory Commission fined Shenwan Hongyuan for improper management of compliance controls related to Ant Group.

== See also ==
- Securities industry in China
