= 2015–2016 Chinese stock market turbulence =

Financial events

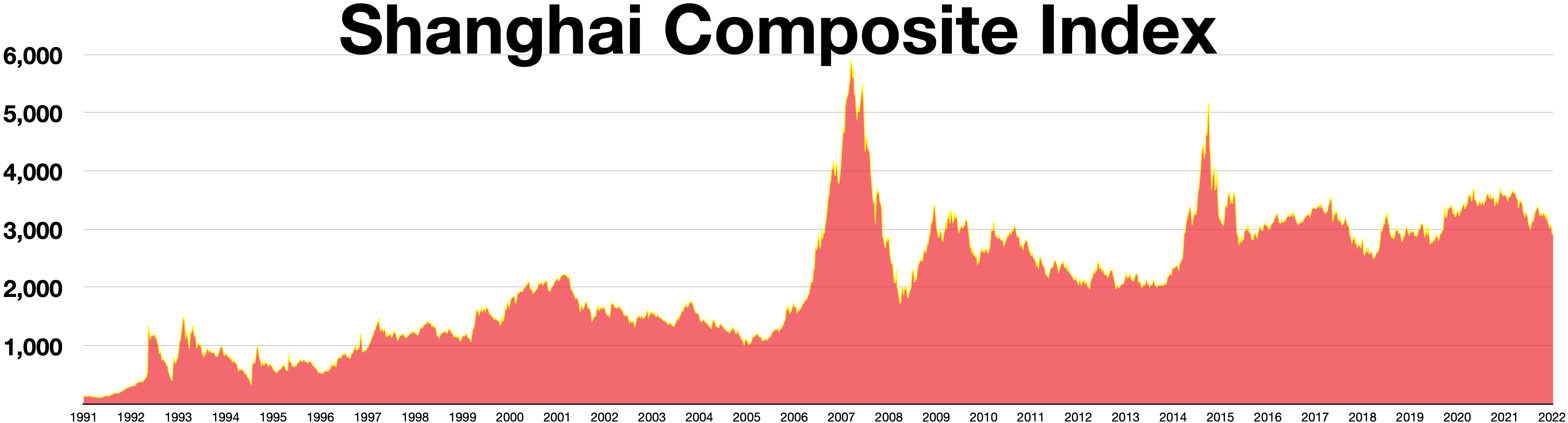
Shanghai Composite Index 1991- 2022

The 2015-2016 Chinese stock market turbulence began with the popping of a stock market bubble on 12 June 2015 and ended in early February 2016. A third of the value of A-shares on the Shanghai Stock Exchange was lost within one month of the event. Major aftershocks occurred around 27 July and 24 August's "Black Monday". By 8–9 July 2015, the Shanghai stock market had fallen 30 percent over three weeks as 1,400 companies, or more than half listed, filed for a trading halt in an attempt to prevent further losses. Values of Chinese stock markets continued to drop despite efforts by the government to reduce the fall. After three stable weeks the Shanghai index fell again by 8.48 percent on 24 August, marking the largest fall since 2007.

At the October 2015 International Monetary Fund (IMF) annual meeting of finance ministers and central bankers from the IMF's 188 member-countries held in Peru, China's slump dominated discussions with participants asking if "China’s economic downturn [would] trigger a new financial crisis".

By the end of December 2015, China's stock market had recovered from the shocks and had outperformed S&P 500 for 2015, though it was still well below the 12 June highs. By the end of 2015, the Shanghai Composite Index was up 12.6 percent. In January 2016, the Chinese stock market experienced a steep sell-off and trading was halted on 4 and 7 January 2016 after the market fell 7%, the latter within 30 minutes of opening. The market meltdown set off a global rout in early 2016.

According to 19 January 2016 articles in the Xinhua News Agency, the official press agency of the People's Republic of China, China reported a 6.9 percent GDP growth rate for 2015 and an "economic volume of over ten trillion U.S. dollars". A Forbes journalist argued that the "stock market crash does not indicate a blowout of the Chinese physical economy." China was shifting from a focus on manufacturing to service industries and while it had slowed, it was still growing by 5%. After this period of turbulence, the Shanghai Composite Index was stable around 3,000 points as of January 2017, 50% less than before the bubble popped.

Publishing in 2024, academic Frances Yaping Wang observed that early 2016 speculation of an economic collapse turned out to be wrong and that the turbulence ended up far from a real crisis.

== Background ==
Following a period of encircling by the western powers during the early history of the People's Republic of China, the modern stock market in China reemerged in the early 1990s with the re-opening of the Shanghai Stock Exchange, and founding of the Shenzhen Security Exchange. By 2000, the Chinese stock market had over 1,000 listed companies, worth a market capitalization of nearly a third of China's overall gross domestic product (GDP), and by the end of 1998, investors had opened nearly 40 million investment accounts. As more companies went public, investors rushed to the Shanghai and Shenzhen exchanges. The Chinese stock market and economy grew quickly, and by 2012, the number of listed companies between the Shanghai and Shenzhen Securities Exchanges had risen to over 2,400, worth a market capitalization of nearly 50% of China's real GDP, and included over 200 million active stock and mutual fund accounts.

China's economic growth, however, was stunted by the 2008 global recession and its aftershocks. The Chinese government responded to 2008 recession with a stimulus package that would draw resources from both the public and private sectors in order to fund an unprecedented infrastructure build. Growth following the stimulus package was rapid – from 2009 to 2011, real GDP growth in China grew at approximately 9.6%, though in the two years that followed, real GDP growth fell to 7.7%.

Seeing the opportunity for a nationwide reinvestment into the economy through the stock market, the government developed a campaign that would entice every day citizens to trade – it was referred to as "Zhongguo meng" (中国梦), which translates to the Chinese Dream. First conceived and pushed by China's paramount leader and general secretary, Xi Jinping, the 'dream' was one of overall economic prosperity and an elevated international status.

The trading population that developed in China differed in important ways from those elsewhere in the world. In China, the stock market trading activity is dominated by individual investors (close to 85%) – also known as 'retail investors.' Indicative of the sheer size of investor inflow into the markets, after several months of a bull market developing in China, more than 30 million new accounts were opened by retail investors in the first 5 months of 2015, according to data from the China's Securities Depository and Clearing Corp. And while a larger, more active investing population generally means greater market capitalization, many of these new traders were inexperienced and easily manipulated by the buying frenzy, with nearly two-thirds having never entered or graduated high school, according to a survey by China's Southwestern University of Finance and Economics. As a result, momentum and rumors among the traders carried more weight than reason when it came to investing decisions, creating a trend of impulsive buying and overvaluation in the market.

Leading up to the crash, in an attempt to free up additional money for trading, the China Securities Regulatory Commission (CSRC), responsible for proposing and enforcing securities laws, had loosened several related financial regulations. Prior to significant policy reform in 2010, the act of selling short – essentially, borrowing and selling stock with the belief that its price will fall – and trading on margin – trading with debt – were strictly prohibited in China. However, in March 2010, China implemented a testing phase for their stock exchange in which 90 selected companies were authorized to be sold short and traded on margin. This list was expanded over time, with over 280 companies being given the same authorization in late 2011. Shortly thereafter, the CSRC implemented a total policy shift which legalized both practices across the entire stock market. These regulation changes led to significant increases in borrowing for the purpose of trading, and short selling became the most popular investing strategy among traders. From 2010, when the changes were implemented, to 2012, average daily short turnover increased from 0.01% to 0.73%, and average daily margin purchase turnover increased from 0.78% to 5.15%. As a result, the Chinese market was being flooded with debt-funded trades and risky short selling plays.

To make matters worse, the CSRC also became a regulatory bystander, refusing to take action that would upset the political and social stability of the time. Instead of de-listing public companies that failed to perform for three consecutive quarters – a well-known regulation in China – the CSRC would regularly let those companies slide for fear of upsetting the shareholders. This added to the flames of bad investing, allowing investors to continue pouring their money into companies that were underperforming and overvaluing shares that were essentially worthless on the books.

== 2015 ==
=== Chinese RMB ===
According to SWIFT data, by November 2014 China's renminbi (RMB) – also known as the yuan – "became one of the world's top five payment currencies...overtaking the Canadian dollar and the Australian dollar".

On 11 August, two months after the turbulence, the People's Bank of China devalued the RMB – by 1.86 percent to CN¥6.2298 per US dollar. A lower renminbi (RMB) "makes China’s exports more competitive in foreign markets, offsetting part of the surge in the country’s blue-collar wages over the last decade; and it makes foreign companies, houses and other overseas investments seem more expensive." On 14 August, the central bank devalued it again to CN¥6.3975 per US dollar. In August there was speculation about the causes of the devaluation of the yuan and the changes in the Chinese economy in 2015, including the "growth in its services sector rather than heavy industry". By mid-January 2016, an article in The Economist argued that the strains on the yuan indicated a problem with China's politics. However, a spokesperson for the International Energy Agency (IEA) argued that the risk was "overplayed". During the drastic sell-off on 7 January 2016 China's central bank, the People’s Bank of China set the official midpoint rate on RMB to its lowest level since March 2011—at CN¥6.5646 per US dollar.

On 8 October 2015 China launched a new clearing system developed by the People’s Bank of China (PBOC) – Cross-Border Inter-Bank Payments System (CIPS) – to settle cross-border RMB transactions and intended to "increase global usage of the Chinese currency", by "cutting transaction costs and processing times" and removing "one of the biggest hurdles to internationalizing the yuan". Because of the stock market turbulence, the launch had been delayed and CIPS was '"watered down," offering a "complementary network for settling trade-related deals in the Chinese currency to a current patchwork of Chinese clearing banks around the world".

By December 2015, the RMB was still the "fifth most used global payments currency and the second most used currency for trade finance" with 27 per cent of China's goods invoiced in RMB compared to 19 per cent in 2014. In December China was the world's largest exporter. By October 2016, the Renminbi will be added to the special drawing rights currency basket, the foreign exchange reserve assets defined and maintained by the International Monetary Fund, which includes the U.S. dollar, Euro, Japanese yen and pound sterling. The IMF's decision to add the RMB to the SDR, was "crucial to global financial stability" as it would encourage China to "continue to be a responsible global citizen and liberalise its exchange rate, while intervening to ensure a gradual decline".

=== China's PMI ===
In August 2015, Caixin Media – a closely watched gauge of nationwide manufacturing activity – announced that the China Purchasing Managers' Index (PMI) had declined to 51.5. This was the beginning of a decline that continued into December 2015 with the PMI falling below 50 – anything below 50 indicates deceleration. PMIs are economic indicators derived from monthly surveys of companies' purchasing managers and produced by the financial information firm, Markit Group, which compiles the survey and conducts PMIs for over 30 countries worldwide. From 2010 to 2015 HSBC had sponsored Markit's China PMI, but that relationship ended in June and Caixin stepped in.

By 2016 the PMI was down for the fifth month indicating a cooling in manufacturing in China. Manufacturing activity is a key sign of economic performance. December was the tenth month in a row that manufacturing in China had contracted raising concerns that China's economy was not on steadier footing. It was seen as the most recent indication of slowing global economic growth. Since China is the world's largest metal consumer and producer, and "the world’s second largest economy", the China PMI is closely watched. This 2016 selling frenzy was fueled by the most recent private survey of factory activity, the December 2015 report by Caixin on China's PMI reading which showed that China's manufacturing activity had slowed again in December 2015 to a PMI reading of 48.2 – with anything below 50 indicating deceleration.

=== Stock market bubble ===
In the year leading up to the turbulence, following the trends in the west, enthusiastic individual investors inflated the stock market bubble through mass amounts of investments in stocks often using borrowed money, exceeding the rate of economic growth and profits of the companies they were investing in.

Investors faced margin calls on their stocks and many were forced to sell off shares in droves, precipitating the turbulence.

"...from June 2014 to June 2015, prices increased more than 150 percent on the Shanghai exchange, and even more on the Shenzhen Stock Exchange and the Shenzhen ChiNext board, a Nasdaq-style marketplace. An unusually large part of this run-up was fueled by retail investors who borrowed to buy equities. The market was priced way beyond perfection. Once prices fell even slightly, many of these investors found themselves needing to sell, leading to a sharp market correction."

— Nicholas Lardy The New York Times 26 August 2015

== 2015 Government response ==
The Chinese government enacted many measures to stem the tide of the turbulence. A group of state-owned financial institutions dubbed the "national team" spent RMB 1.6 trillion to buy shares of thousands of companies. Regulators restricted net selling by brokerage firms, suspended new initial public offerings, and restricted short selling. The government also provided cash to brokers to buy shares, backed by central-bank cash. In addition, China Securities Regulatory Commission (CSRC) imposed a six-month ban on stockholders owning more than 5 percent of a company's stock from selling those stocks, resulting in a 6 percent rise in stock markets. Further, around 1,300 total firms, representing 45 percent of the stock market, suspended the trading of stocks starting on 8 July.

As of 30 August, the Chinese government arrested 197 people, including a Wang Xiaolu, a journalist at the "influential financial magazine Caijing", and stock market officials, for "spreading rumours" about the market crash and 2015 Tianjin explosions. The crime of spreading rumours carries a three-year jail sentence after its introduction in 2013.

The government officials accused "foreign forces" of "intentionally [unsettling] the market" and planned crackdown on them.

On 1 November billionaire hedge fund manager, Xu Xiang was arrested for allegedly manipulating the stock market during the 2015 Chinese stock market turbulence.

According to Caixin media, "Calls for China to adopt a circuit breaker mechanism gained momentum after a stock market rout in the summer that saw the Shanghai Composite Index, which tracks the stock prices of all companies listed in the city, plunge from more than 5,000 points in mid-June to less than 3,000 in late August."

== Black Monday and Tuesday ==
On 24 August, Shanghai main share index lost 8.49% of its value. As a result, billions of pounds were lost on international stock markets with some international commentators labeling the day Black Monday. There were similar losses of over 7% on 25 August causing some commentators to call it Black Tuesday.

=== World finance response ===
In the week prior to Black Monday, the Dow Jones Industrial Average had fallen over concerns about the yuan, low gas prices, and uncertainty over the U.S. Federal Reserve's moves to raise interest rates. On Black Monday, the Dow dropped 1000 points at opening, the largest drop ever.

Money magazine estimated that the potential negative impact on the United States stock market may come about when Chinese investors begin to seek out relatively stable U.S. investments in treasuries, stocks, and cash, and further strengthen an already-strong U.S. dollar, thereby raising the prices on U.S. goods and diminishing export profits.

Global companies that relied on the Chinese market suffered from the turbulence. Stocks that they own were devalued US$4,000,000,000,000. For example, French alcoholic beverage company, Rémy Cointreau, and British luxury-goods company, Burberry, saw their shares devalued and declining demand of their imports from Chinese distributors. Second-quarter sales of American fast food company, Yum! Brands, in China dropped 10 percent, resulting in revenue going under the company's estimate. South African ore mining company, Kumba Iron Ore, eliminated its dividends on 21 July as the 61 percent loss of profit in the first half of the year was announced.

On 19 January 2016 the Bank of England (BoE) Governor Mark Carney cited "Chinese growth hitting a 25-year low" as one of the reasons the BoE will likely not "raise rates until the second half of this year at the earliest" during his talk at Queen Mary University in London.

An article in the Guardian argued that "American commentators relentlessly push a "China-led slowdown" narrative, but the reality is that the US is a relatively insulated economy. Yes – Chinese equities have fallen sharply in recent months, yet the Shanghai Composite Index of leading stocks remains 40pc up on its level just 18 months ago. This is a home-grown US slowdown, much as it pains America to admit it."

=== Commentator response ===
Some mass media outlets had alarmist headlines in August 2015, with The Guardian comparing the pattern of losses during China's Black Monday to the Wall Street crash of 1929, and an article in The Mirror about Damian McBride, a former adviser to British Prime Minister Gordon Brown, calling on people to stock up on canned food because the coming crash would be twenty times worse than the 2008 financial crisis. Others such as The Economist questioned its severity. George Osborne, Chancellor of the Exchequer of the United Kingdom, said that the Chinese stock market turbulence will not have a big impact on European economies.

The Globe and Mail journalist Nathan Vanderklippe argued that "To understand the devaluation of the yuan and the changes in the Chinese economy today, look to the growth in its services sector rather than heavy industry." Vanderklippe described the new economy as "the investment banks, restaurant chains and airlines that make up the services sector". In 2014 the service industry in China increased to represent 44.6 per cent of the economy. (In the United States the service industry represents 80%, in Canada, roughly 70 per cent and in India, 57 per cent of the economy.) By 17 August 2015 the services sector in China which includes "hotels, banks, cellphone providers and spas" was thriving. "In the first half of 2015, the GDP among services rose 8.4 per cent, some 2 1/2 times the growth rate in the primary, or extractive, sector."

"The relationship between industrial growth and GDP growth [in China] has completely broken down...The change is profound, but 'grossly underappreciated.'"

— Nicholas Lardy Peterson Institute for International Economics

As China experienced a period of stock market turbulence in the summer of 2015 worsened by "economic weakness, financial panic, and the policy response to these problems", Anatole Kaletsky disagreed with those who claimed that China was the "global economy’s weakest link". He claimed that "weak economic data leads to financial turmoil, which induces policy blunders that in turn fuel more financial panic, economic weakness, and policy mistakes."

According to The Economist, China had a "record trade surplus of $595 billion in 2015". However, in the "last six months of 2015 capital left China at an annualised rate of about $1 trillion".

According to an article in The Wall Street Journal,

"China is the wild card. It borrowed huge amounts to stimulate its economy, leading to serious overcapacity in everything from factories to luxury apartments. The unwinding of this binge is one of the causes of the current market turmoil."

— Justin Lahart The Wall Street Journal 15 January 2016

Neil Atkinson of the International Energy Agency (IEA), was cited in The Economist in January 2016 arguing that although the sell-off in oil in January "occurred concurrently with a slide in the Chinese stock market and the yuan which some investors think reflects weakness in China's economy and hence in demand for oil", the risk is "overplayed". "[F]igures on January 13th showed China imported a record 6.7m barrels a day (b/d) of oil in 2015."

According to Nicholas R. Lardy, "author of Markets Over Mao: The Rise of Private Business in China and fellow at the Peterson Institute for International Economics who has written extensively on the development of the Chinese economy", the "popular narrative" that China is in "a financial and economic meltdown" "is not well supported by the facts". "[S]ervices, not industry, are driving China’s growth." Lardy explained the rout in August as an overdue correction in China's equity market.

== January 2016 global meltdown ==
On both 4 January and 7 January 2016 the Chinese stock market experienced a sharp sell-off of about 8% that quickly sent stocks tumbling globally. From 4 to 15 January, China’s stock market fell 18% and the Dow Jones Industrial Average was down 8.2%.

During the first fifteen minutes of the first day of trading in the Chinese stock exchange, the "stock market fell by 5% before leading regulators halted trading. It was reopened for another fifteen minutes and stocks fell until trading was again halted." "The blue-chip CSI 300 Index dropped 8% while the benchmark Shanghai Composite index fell 6.9%. The technology-heavy Shenzhen Composite was the worst performer and fell by more than 8%."

=== 2016 China Securities Regulatory Commission response ===
On 4 January 2016 stock markets in China fell to the point of triggering its new trading curb rule, a market mechanism that halts trading when losses reach a threshold which is intended to help stabilize stocks, for the first time. In comparison, in the United States the trading curb rule or circuit breaker was first applied in the October 27, 1997 mini-crash during the 1997 Asian financial crisis. During that mini-crash, many exchanges fell and the Dow Jones Industrial Average dropped 7.18% in value but recovered quickly.

A spokesperson for the CSRC argued that the rules for the trading curb differed from those in the United States; in the U.S. the emphasis is on preventing systemic risk. "We had to consider there is more speculation and irrational investment behavior" because China has more individual investors than the United States." According to an article in The Economist—unlike most major markets—millions of individual investors dominate the Chinese stock market, driving "more than 80 percent of trading on bourses in Shanghai and Shenzhen, versus about 15 percent in the U.S." An article in Forbes claims that these "unsophisticated" Mom and Pop retail investors tend to "over-react", "mis-read signals", and buy and sell on speculative instincts.

The trading curb ruled was put in operation after the first 27 minutes of trading on the Chinese stock exchange on Thursday, 7 January, as Chinese stocks plunged 7 percent.

In a surprise move on 7 January 2016, China's central bank, the People’s Bank of China set the official midpoint rate on the yuan, also known as the renminbi (RMB), to its lowest level since March 2011—at CN¥6.5646 per US dollar. A lower renminbi (RMB) "makes China’s exports more competitive in foreign markets, offsetting part of the surge in the country’s blue-collar wages over the last decade; and it makes foreign companies, houses and other overseas investments seem more expensive".

On 7 January, Chinese authorities suspended the circuit breaker out of concern that the trade curb may "have intensified investors' concerns".

On 16 January 2016 Xiao Gang the head of China Securities Regulatory Commission defended the CSRC's crisis management of the "abnormal volatility in the stock market". Xiao "promised to crack down on illegal activities, increase market transparency and better educate investors" in a period with "rising uncertainty in external markets, including the global equity-market slump, plummeting commodities prices and currency devaluations in emerging markets".

=== 2016 Commentators ===
Data from surveys compiled by the financial information firm, Markit Group showed that China's PMI was 48.2 in December 2015 down from 48.6 in November, 48.3 in October, September is 50.5 and 51.5 in August. The October report was encouraging but the December report dampened hopes for recovery and triggered fears for China's overall economy. and markets around the world responded.

On Friday, 1 January 2016 The Guardian reported that China's factory activity continued to decline, overseas demand for goods fell and export orders for Chinese manufacturers fell. Stock markets which had already responded by mid-December with "metals [experiencing] a broad-based drop on the weakness of manufacturing activity in China, According to the Institute for Supply Management (ISM), a group of purchasing managers which conducts PMIs, the US also had a PMI of 48.2 in December down from 48.6 in November. The October PMI was 50.1 in October. Whereas China has experienced a gradual decline since late 2014, the United States last decline was in November 2012. But the December 2015 US PMI was "the lowest since the end of the recession and marks the first time since 2009 for consecutive months in contraction territory". The slower manufacturing activity in the United States was blamed on the strong US dollar, a weak global economy, low oil prices and excessive inventories.

In October 2015 Caixin China General Services PMI reported that "Chinese business activity [had declined] at its quickest rate since start of 2009".

"In the group of non-energy commodities, metals experienced a broad-based drop on the weakness of manufacturing activity in China while agriculture prices were also generally down. Precious metals showed their largest drop since 2013 on firmer expectations of interest rate hikes in the US.

— "OECD December 2015

=== January 2016 global rout ===
The sell-off on the Chinese stock market "set off a global rout, with stocks in Europe and the United States getting hit", with many stocks down 2% to 3%. The German stock index, the DAX its blue-chip shares index slumped to 9979 points on 7 January "falling below the psychologically important 10,000-point threshold" which represents 2.29 percent fall from 6 January. By 3:22 Monday on 4 January in New York the "Dow Jones Industrial Average had fallen 2.2%, the "S&P 2.1%, and Nasdaq Composite 2.6%", pan-European Stoxx Europe 600 index 2.5%, Shanghai Composite Index 6.9% and the "Vanguard FTSE Emerging Markets Exchange-Traded Fund lost 3.3%". US stocks such as Netflix fell by 6%, Alphabet 3.9% and Facebook 3.9%. On the same day "the Brazilian real fell 2% against the dollar and Brazilian equities dropped 1.6% to 42,646.19, its lowest since 16 March 2007."

== Bloomberg debate on China at Davos 2016 ==
At the 2016 World Economic Forum conference in Davos, hosted by Bloomberg, which included panelists Christine Lagarde of the International Monetary Fund (IMF), Gary Cohn of Goldman Sachs, Ray Dalio of Bridgewater Associates, Soho China CEO Zhang Xin, China Securities Regulatory Commission (CSRC) Vice Chairman Fang Xinghai and Jiang Jianqing of the Industrial and Commercial Bank of China, they discussed volatility and transitions. Zhang Xin noted

"...a total decoupling of the stock markets as a realty state developer—which is hugely discounted—and the real economy where you see the easing of monetary policy is actually pushing the asset price up...In terms of transition from investment-driven economy to consumption-driven economy for real estate that means that we used to build buildings and today we just manage the leasing... In terms of leasing actually it is going quite well. In cities I operate in—Beijing and Shanghai—we're seeing a massive take-up of new space from [mostly] Internet companies. We're seeing not so much new take-off from the old economy, like non-internet traditional economy. But by and large we have new buildings coming up in the market everyday... We haven't seen a single building empty, not being taken up. So I think there must be a communication issue because on the one hand the real economy seems to be doing OK but on the other hand, the stock market is trading at a huge discount. Obviously the investors are not getting the same message as we [who are] operating is doing."

— Zhang Xin CEO of Soho China, Davos Bloomberg Panel 2016

== Result ==
The 2015 stock market turbulence was among the factors which prompted the Xi administration to increase its emphasis on China's state-owned enterprises.

Publishing in 2024, academic Frances Yaping Wang observed that, in contrast to the early 2016 speculation, predictions of an economic collapse turned out to be wrong and that the turbulence ended up far from a real crisis.

== See also ==
- Chinese stock bubble of 2007
- List of stock market crashes and bear markets
- Stock market crashes in India
- SSE Composite Index
