= Bank of Beijing =

Urban commercial bank based in Beijing, China

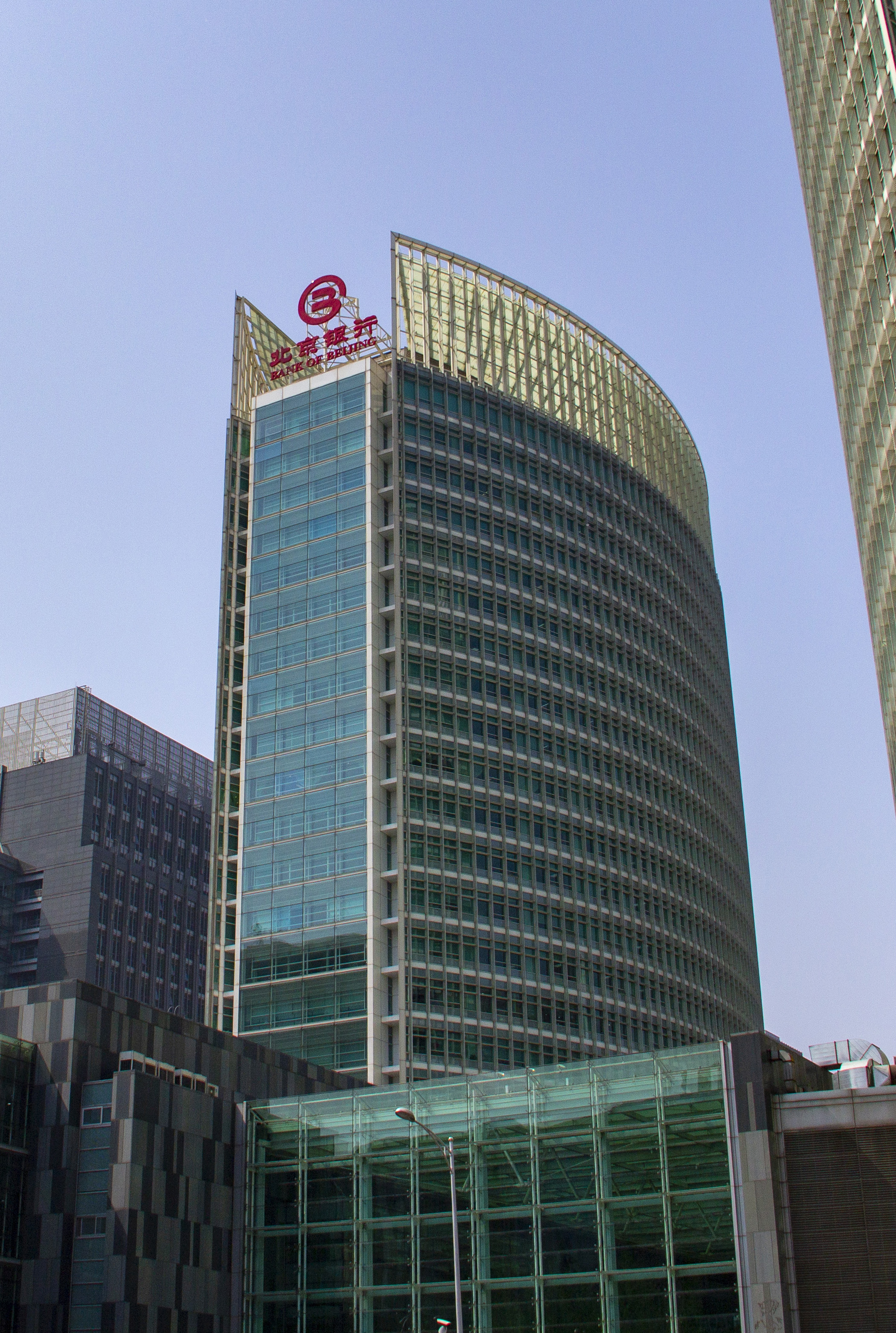
- Type: Public
Traded as
SSE: 601169	(ordinary)
SSE: 360018	(preference 1)
SSE: 360023	(preference 2)
SSE 50 Component
- ISIN: CNE100000734
- Industry: Financial services
- Founded: 29 January 1996
- Headquarters: Beijing, China
- Number of locations: 561 branches and representative offices (end 2017)
- Area served: mainland China; Hong Kong S.A.R., China (representative office); Amsterdam, the Netherlands (representative office)
Key people
Zhang Dongning	(chairman)
Yang Shujian	(governor)
Zeng Ying	(chief supervisor)
- Services: retail banking; corporate banking; bancassurance (life insurance only)
- Revenue: ▲CN¥50 billion (2017)
- Operating income: ▲CN¥23 billion (2017)
- Net income: ▲CN¥19 billion (2017)
- Total assets: ▲CN¥2.329 trillion (end 2017)
- Total equity: ▲CN¥175 billion (end 2017)
Owner
Beijing municipal government	(17.22%)
ING Bank	(13.03%)
Macro-Link Holding	(8.57%)
general public and other shareholders	(61.18%)

Chinese name
- Simplified Chinese: 北京银行股份有限公司
- Traditional Chinese: 北京銀行股份有限公司
- Literal meaning: Beijing Bank, Company Limited by Shares
Transcriptions
Standard Mandarin
- Hanyu Pinyin: Běi jīng yín háng gǔ fèn yǒu xiàn gōng sī

Chinese short name
- Simplified Chinese: 北京银行
- Traditional Chinese: 北京銀行
Transcriptions
Standard Mandarin
- Hanyu Pinyin: Běi jīng yín háng
- Capital ratio: ▲8.92% (CET1 at end 2017)
- Rating: BB+ (Fitch, September 2017)
- Website: www.bankofbeijing.com.cn

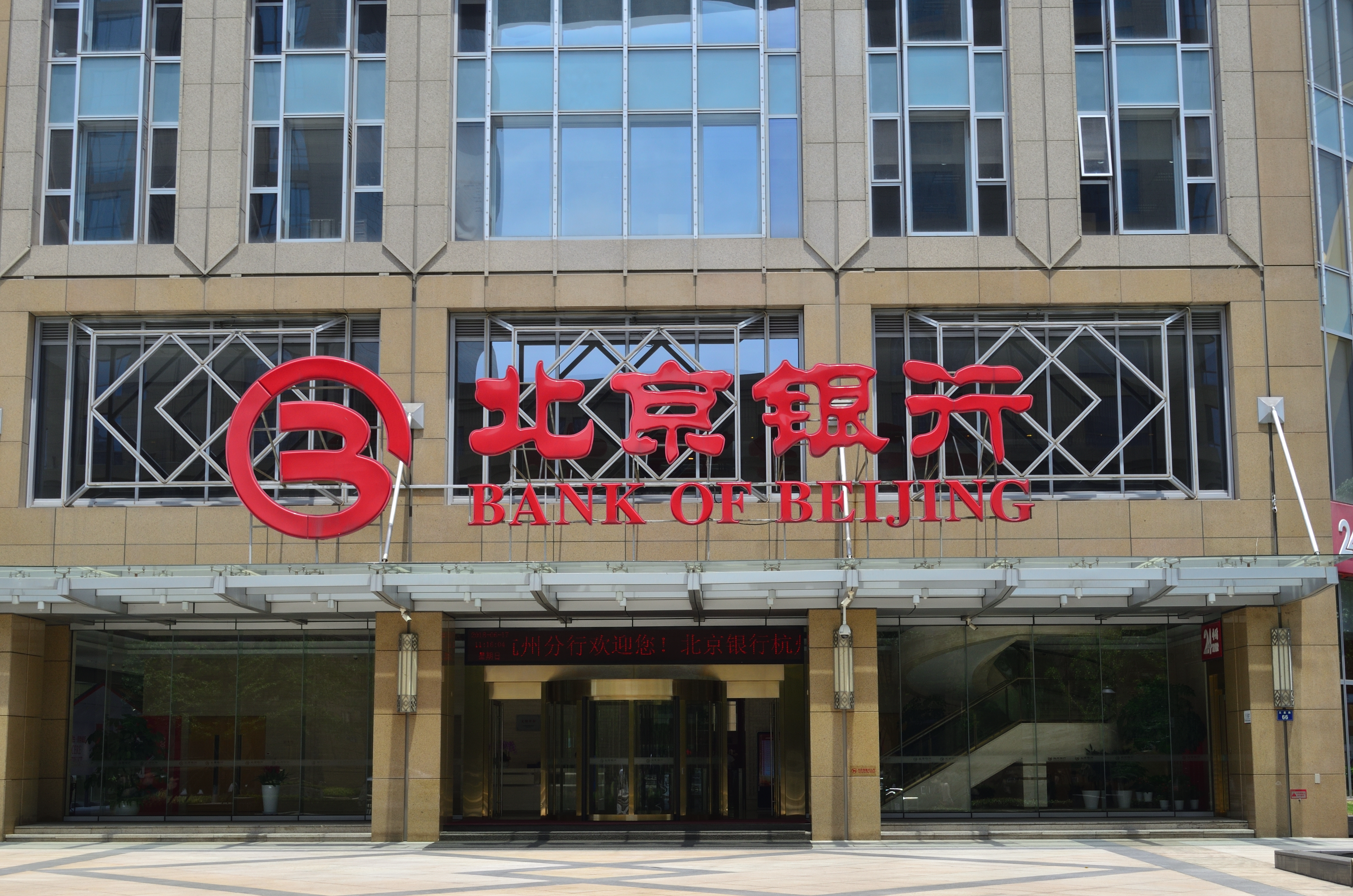
Bank of Beijing in Hangzhou

Bank of Beijing Co., Ltd. (abb. BOB) is an urban commercial bank based in Beijing, China. According to the bank, most of the revenue came from Beijing, despite that the banking group had more than half of the branches located outside the direct-controlled municipality (As of 31 December 2017, 302 out of 559 branches were located outside Beijing). The Beijing Municipal People's Government and the Netherlands-based multinational bank ING Bank were the major shareholders of the bank.

As of April 2018, the bank, as a listed company, is a constituent of SSE 180 Index, as well as its sub-index, the blue chip SSE 50 Index. It was also part of pan-China indexes such as FTSE China A50 Index and CSI 100 Index.

== History ==
The bank, initially known as 北京城市合作银行, was incorporated on 29 January 1996. (or founded on 8 January 1996 according to another source; the establishment of the bank was approved by various departments in June–December 1995.) The bank was founded as a holding company for the credit unions (Chinese: 城市信用社) in the city. However, in 1997, it was discovered that one of the former credit union of the banking group in Zhongguancun, had an accounting scandal with a huge deficit. The manager of that branch was arrested in 2011 and was sentenced 14 years imprisonment in 2012; the governor of that branch was arrested in 1998 and was sentenced capital punishment in 2003.

It was known as 北京市商业银行 (literally Beijing City Commercial Bank) since 1998, as one of the licensee of urban commercial bank (Chinese: 城市商业银行). In 2004, China Banking Regulatory Commission approved the renaming to Bank of Beijing (Chinese: 北京银行). It became effective on 1 January 2005.

In 2005, the bank became a Sino-foreign joint venture, which ING Group purchased 19.9% shares of the bank. On 19 September 2007, the bank became a listed company on the Shanghai Stock Exchange. The bank also purchased a Sino-foreign joint venture insurance company, which was previous known as ING Capital Life Insurance in 2010, from municipal-owned Beijing Capital Group. As of 31 December 2017, the bank still owned 50% stake of the insurer, which now known as BOB-Cardif Life. Despite that it was now a joint venture of the bank and French multinational company Cardif, the insurer was still known as 中荷人寿 in Chinese, literally Sino-Dutch Life Insurance.

In December 2017, ING subscribed the capital increase of the bank, despite that the ownership ratio of the ordinary shares was still diluted from 13.6% to 13.0%. Before the capital increase, Beijing municipal government only owned 8.84% shares via Beijing State-owned Assets Management, as well as additional 5.08% via Beijing Energy Investment Holdings. However, it also caused a minor controversy in 2013, as Ren Zhiqiang (Chinese: 任志强), an independent director of the bank, accused the State-owned Assets Supervision and Administration Commission (SASAC) of Beijing municipal government (Note: The parent entity of Beijing State-owned Assets Management and Beijing Energy Investment Holdings) had influenced the election of the supervisory board (Chinese: 监事会) of the bank, which Qiang Xin (Chinese: 强新), the deputy of Beijing SASAC was elected as the chairwoman of the supervisory board (Chinese: 监事长), replacing Shi Yuan (Chinese: 史元). Qiang also served as the Deputy Party Committee Secretary of the bank since 2010. Qiang was succeeded by Zeng Ying (Chinese: 曾颖) in 2016; she was the deputy of Beijing Bureau of China Banking Regulatory Commission in 2011.

The bank also faced another minor scandal in February 2015, in which a director of the bank, Lu Haijun (Chinese: 陆海军) was under investigation for corruption. He was dismissed by the shareholders' meeting during 2015. Since 2008, Lu was also the chairman of Beijing Energy Investment Holdings, a shareholder of the bank. Lu was sentenced to 11 years' imprisonment for his crime as the manager of Beijing Energy Investment Holdings in 2016.

== Joint ventures ==
As of 31 December 2017

- BOB-Cardif Life (50%)

== Equity investments ==
As of 31 December 2017

- UnionPay (1.28%)
- Bank of Langfang (3.57%)
- Nongan BOB Rural Bank (25.5%)
- Hebei Lizhou BOB Rural Commercial Bank (30%)

== Shareholders ==
The Beijing Municipal People's Government and the Netherlands-based multinational bank ING Bank were the major shareholders of the bank. As of 31 December 2017, ING owned 13.03%, Beijing municipal government, via Beijing State-owned Assets Management, owned 8.63% ordinary shares, as well as additional 8.59% shares owned via Beijing Energy Investment Holdings. The third largest shareholder, Macro-Link Holding (Chinese: 新华联控股), was a private company.

== Ranking ==
The bank was ranked as the 73rd in the world (and 15th in the mainland China) in 2017 Top 1000 World Banks by The Banker magazine, in terms of banks' equity. The bank was ranked 155th in 2010 (12th inside the mainland China), and 77th in 2016 in Top 1000 World Banks.

== See also ==
- Huaxia Bank, another Beijing based medium-sized bank, which was also a Sino-foreign joint venture
