= Marshall Nicholson =

Hong Kong investment banker

- Education: Columbia University (BS, MS); University of Virginia (MBA)
- Occupation: Investment banker
- Employer(s): BOC International; China International Capital Corp; Nomura

John Marshall Nicholson (Chinese: 凌瀚燊) is a Hong Kong investment banker.

== Career ==
Nicholson worked at Merrill Lynch and J.P. Morgan in New York City before moving to Hong Kong in 2002 to take up a position as Credit Suisse First Boston's Asia-ex-Japan head of equity capital markets. In 2005, he transferred to the Macquarie Group, where he held the position of head of China equity capital markets; his hiring was part of a large recruitment drive which saw Macquarie poach Hong Kong-based ECM staff from a number of major banks.

In January 2007, Nicholson left Macquarie, one of several senior ECM bankers resigning at the time. He joined BOC International as vice-chairman of the investment banking division, one of the first senior foreign executives at any Chinese bank. At BOCI, he served as advisor on a number of major deals, including Rusal's initial public offering on the Hong Kong Stock Exchange in 2010. Nicholson's strategy after he joined involved a "build out" of the ECM business and the institutional equities franchise. In 2005, two years before he joined, BOCI led no equity offerings at all, and only seven in 2006; in 2008 through 2010, in contrast, it led sixty-five.

In February 2012, Nicholson resigned from his post at BOCI. He then became a managing director at China International Capital Corp, the first joint venture investment bank in China. He resigned from CICC in June 2014. In March 2015, Nicholson took a new post at Nomura's Hong Kong office as head of Asia-ex-Japan equity capital markets. As of December 2017 he remained in that position.

== Personal life ==
Nicholson did his bachelor's and master's degree in chemical engineering at Columbia University, and went on to earn a Master of Business Administration from the University of Virginia Darden School of Business. He married a Hong Kong woman in 2003.

Nicholson applied to the Hong Kong Immigration Department for naturalisation as a Chinese citizen; as the Nationality Law of the People's Republic of China does not permit applicants for naturalisation to retain their former citizenships, he renounced U.S. citizenship on 12 April 2013 at the U.S. Consulate-General in Hong Kong. Nicholson stated that he had chosen to naturalise in order to "make my situation reflect my personal and professional view of my long-term interests". Colleagues suggested his motivations included convenience of travel to mainland China in order to visit clients, since only Hong Kong residents of Chinese nationality and not other nationalities are eligible for Home Return Permits. Peter Thal Larsen analysed Nicholson's choice as a career move intended to demonstrate to clients that he saw Hong Kong as his home and was not using it as a stepping-stone to opportunities in London or New York like many other expatriate bankers.
