= Hongyuan Securities =

Hongyuan Securities Company Limited 宏源證券股份有限公司
- Type: State-owned enterprise
- Industry: Securities
- Founded: 1993
- Defunct: January 2015
- Fate: Became part of Shenwan Hongyuan after merger
- Headquarters: Beijing, People's Republic of China
- Area served: People's Republic of China
- Key people: Chairman: Mr. Tang Shisheng
- Parent: China Jianyin Investment Limited

Hongyuan Securities Company Limited (SZSE: 000562) was a leading securities firm headquartered in Beijing. It involves in the purchase and sale of stocks, funds, warrants and bonds, the underwriting and distribution of IPO stocks as well as the investment on financial assets and derivatives. It was established in 1993 and listed on the Shenzhen Stock Exchange in 1994. It is the first securities firm listed on the stock exchange in China.

In January 2015, the company merged with Hongyuan Securities to form Shenwan Hongyuan.
