= Zhongtai Securities =

Chinese Securities Brokerage

Zhongtai Securities Co., Ltd.

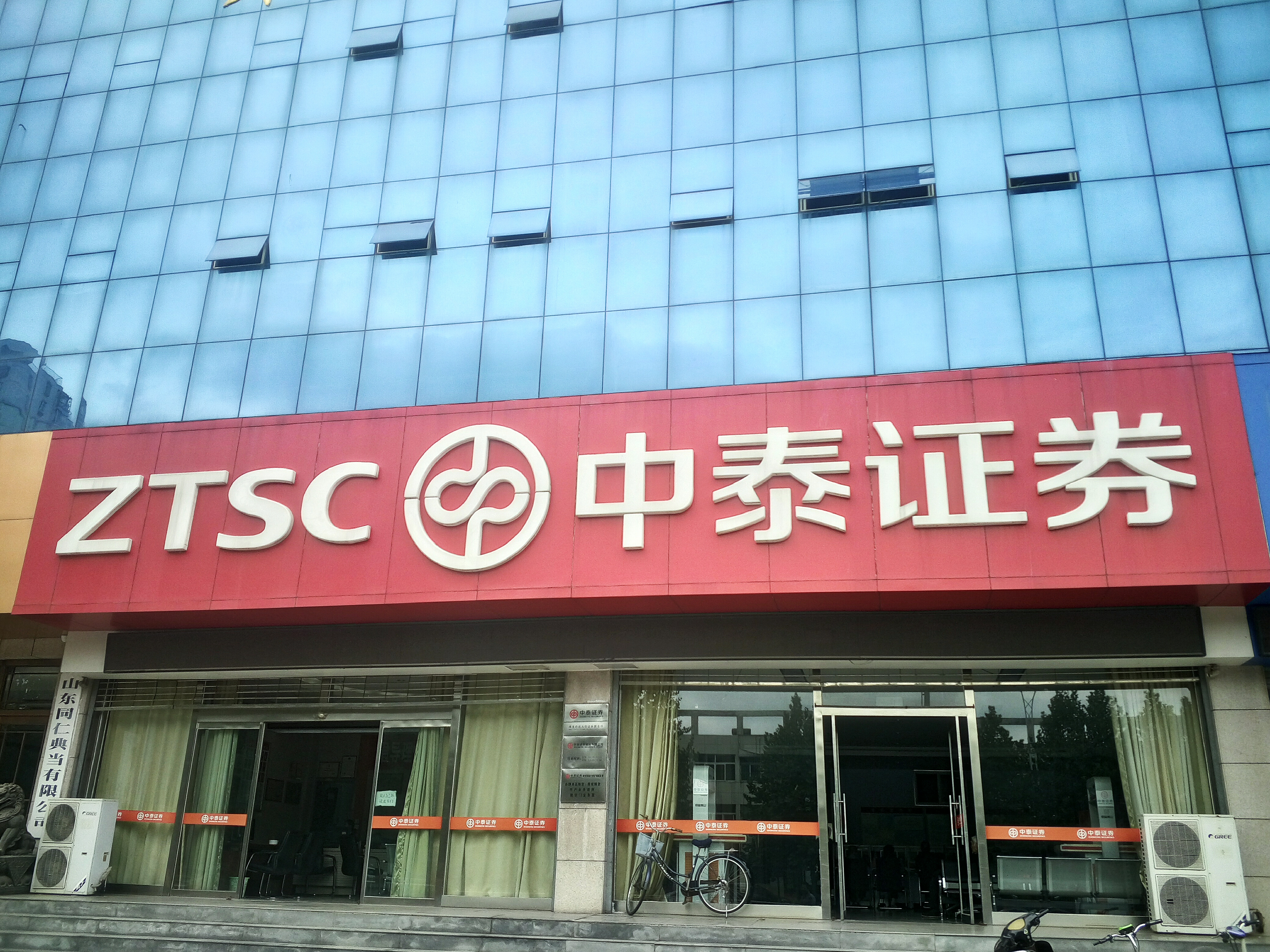
- Branch in Gangcheng District, Jinan
- Native name: 中泰证券股份有限公司
- Formerly: Qilu Securities Co., Ltd.
- Company type: Public company State-owned
- Traded as: SSE: 600918; SSE 180 Component
- Industry: Financial services
- Founded: 15 May 2001; 25 years ago
- Headquarters: Jinan, Shandong, People's Republic of China
- Services: Securities brokerage Investment banking Investment management
- Revenue: ▲CN¥18.16 billion (FY 2021)
- Net income: ▲CN¥3.2 billion (FY 2021)
- Total assets: ▲CN¥204.69 billion (FY 2021)
- Total equity: ▲CN¥37.16 billion (FY 2021)
- Owner: Shandong SASAC
- Number of employees: ▲8,771 (FY 2021)
- Subsidiaries: Zhongtai Futures; Zhongtai International
- Website: www.zts.com.cn

Zhongtai Securities (ZTSC) (Chinese: 中泰证券; pinyin: Zhōngtài Zhèngquàn) is a securities company in China which engages in the operation of large-scale comprehensive securities broking and trading services. The company was founded in 2001 and is headquartered in Jinan, Shandong. It is listed on the Shanghai Stock Exchange and is a member of the SSE 180 Index.

== Background ==
The company was originally founded as Qilu Securities on 15 May 2001.

In September 2006, Qilu Securities acquired Quanxin Futures. On 14 February 2007, Quanxin Futures was renamed to Luzheng Futures.

At the end of 2013, Qilu Securities set up a SFC regulated subsidiary in Hong Kong named Qilu International Holdings that would perform various security broker dealer activities.

In August 2015, Luzheng Futures was listed on the Hong Kong Stock Exchange (ticker symbol: 1461).

On 26 September 2015, the company changed its name to Zhongtai Securities. This was done as part of the company's restructuring as it planned to hold an initial public offering on the Hong Kong Stock Exchange. Qilu International Holdings was subsequently renamed to Zhongtai Financial International Limited (Zhongtai International).

In 2016 Zhongtai Securities applied to also list on the Shanghai Stock Exchange but in September that year disclosed that the China Securities Regulatory Commission was investigating it for suspected breaches of securities and futures laws and regulations.

In March 2017, the SFC fined Zhongtai International $335,000 for failing to comply with Anti Money Laundering regulations when handing third-party fund deposits.

On 23 February 2018, Zhongtai International proposed to take over Hong Kong-listed corporate advisory and toymaking company Quali-Smart Holdings in a US$270 million deal to obtain listing status in Hong Kong. However, on 23 February 2019, Quali-Smart Holdings cancelled the acquisition.

On 3 June 2020, Zhongtai Securities completed its initial public offering on the Shanghai Stock Exchange.

In February 2022, Luzheng Futures was renamed to Zhongtai Futures.

== Shareholding ==
Zhongtai Securities major shareholders as of December 2021 include:

- Zaozhuang Mining (32.62%)
- Laiwu Steel (15.00%)
- Shandong Hi-Speed Investment (5.32%)
- Xinwen Mining (3.47%)

All these entities are ultimately owned by the State-owned Assets Supervision and Administration Commission of the Government of Shandong Province making it the ultimate owner of Zhongtai Securities.

== Controversies ==
On 26 April 2020, Li Xunlei (director of the research) and his team posted a report online regarding China's unemployment. The report, discussing methods for calculating China's unemployment rate was considered controversial over its methodology and accuracy. It stated China's unemployment rate had soared above 20% and was criticized for exaggerating the unemployed population. The report was removed from the internet on the same day. Shortly after Li was removed from his post and replaced by deputy director Dai Zhifeng. A source from Zhongtai Securities said the personnel changes were decided far earlier and had nothing to do with the report. Li has posted that he was not the author of the report and online commentators misunderstood the research and spread rumours about it.

On 17 January 2022, it was reported that Chen Long, former chief strategy analyst of Zhongtai Securities was arrested for market manipulation and insider trading related to Sokon shares. Chen had previously left Zhongtai Securities in November 2021.

== See also ==
- Securities industry in China
