= Fang Xinghai =

Chinese economist

- 方星海
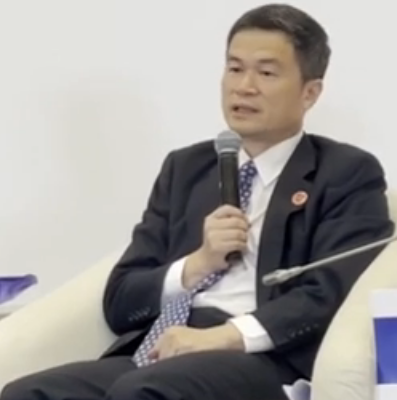
- Fang Xinghai in April 2022

Vice Chairman of the China Securities Regulatory Commission
- In office October 2015 – July 2024
- Preceded by: Liu Xinhua

Director of the Fourth Economic Bureau, Central Financial and Economic Affairs Leading Group Office
- In office June 2014 – October 2015

Director of Financial Services Office, Shanghai Municipal People's Government
- In office October 2007 – September 2013

Personal details
- Born: May 1964 (age 62) Yueqing, Zhejiang, China
- Party: Chinese Communist Party (since 1993)
- Education: Tsinghua University (BS); University of Pittsburgh; Stanford University (PhD)
- Profession: Economist, official

Academic background
- Doctoral advisor: Joseph Stiglitz

Academic work
- Discipline: Economics
- Institutions: World Bank; China Construction Bank; China Galaxy Securities; Shanghai Stock Exchange

Fang Xinghai (Chinese: 方星海, born May 1964) is a Chinese economist and retired official, born in Yueqing, Zhejiang. A member of the Chinese Communist Party since 1993, he has been associated with reform and liberalization of China's financial services sector. In 2024 he was referred to in media as "the key man behind Shanghai's plan to develop the metropolis into an international financial centre".

== Early life and education ==
Fang Xinghai was born in Qianyang Village, Furong Town in Yueqing County, Zhejiang. His father was a soldier and his mother taught at Qianyang Primary School in Furong Town. He grew up in Furong Town and attended Furong Town No. 1 Primary School. At age 14, he moved to Shanghai with his parents and entered Shajing Middle School, later the Affiliated Middle School of Hongkou District Education Institute. He then went to the Affiliated High School of Fudan University. In 1981, he was admitted to the Department of Economics of Tsinghua University (before the School of Economics and Management was established in 1984) and majored there in Management Information Systems. In 1985, Fang Xinghai received funding from the Zou Zhizhuang Economics Study Abroad Program (named in honor of Gregory Chow) and was one of only two undergraduates in the program that year. In 1986, he graduated from Tsinghua University and went to the University of Pittsburgh in the United States. A year later, he applied for a scholarship to Stanford University and transferred to the university to pursue a doctorate in economics, studying under Joseph Stiglitz.

== Career ==
In 1993, Fang Xinghai graduated with a PhD and worked for the World Bank as an economist and investment officer in Washington DC. In August 1998, at the invitation of Zhou Xiaochuan, then president of China Construction Bank (CCB), he returned to serve as the director of the Coordination Committee Office of the CCB Group. In 2000, he joined China Galaxy Securities and served as a member of its Management Committee and Secretary-General. In July 2001, he served as Assistant General Manager, then Deputy General Manager and Party Committee Member of the Shanghai Stock Exchange. In 2003, he participated in the Young Leaders Forum of the National Committee on United States–China Relations. In December 2005, he became deputy director of Financial Services Office of the Shanghai Municipal People's Government, and was promoted Director in October 2007.

In September 2013, Fang moved to Beijing to serve as Inspector of the First Economic Group of the office of the Central Leading Group for Financial and Economic Affairs, the key coordination body for economic and financial policy within the Chinese Communist Party. In June 2014, he served as Director of the Fourth Economic Bureau of the Central Financial and Economic Leading Group Office under Liu He. In October 2015, he was then appointed as Vice Chairman of the China Securities Regulatory Commission (CSRC), replacing Liu Xinhua. In the 2010s, he participated repeatedly in the Annual Meeting of the World Economic Forum in Davos. In 2022, he was instrumental in brokering the agreement between Chinese authorities including the CSRC and the US PCAOB to defuse a longstanding dispute about PCAOB's access to the working papers of auditors of US-listed Chinese companies.

== Retirement ==
Fang Xinghai retired from the CSRC in July 2024. At the time, the South China Morning Post cited an assessment that "Fang, with his plain-speaking style, was viewed by millions of Chinese investors as a key supporter of stock market reforms, giving full play to market forces. He was also a strong advocate for opening up the market to international players. His retirement is likely to slow down the internationalisation of China's capital market".

According to media reports, he considered a senior position at the World Bank, but was blocked by the CCP Organization Department.

In July 2026, Fang was placed under disciplinary review and supervisory investigation by the Central Commission for Discipline Inspection and the National Supervisory Commission for suspected "serious violations of discipline and law". The specific allegations against him were not disclosed at the time.

== See also ==
- Xiao Gang
- Liu Shiyu
- 2015–2016 Chinese stock market turbulence
