= Liu Hongru =

Chinese financial reformer (1930–2025)

- 刘鸿儒

Chairman of the China Securities Regulatory Commission
- In office October 1992 – March 1995
- Premier: Li Peng
- Preceded by: Position established
- Succeeded by: Zhou Daojing

Personal details
- Born: 1930 Yushu, Jilin, China
- Died: 14 March 2025 (aged 94–95) Beijing, China
- Party: Chinese Communist Party
- Education: Moscow State University; Moscow Finance College

Liu Hongru (Chinese: 刘鸿儒; 1930 – 14 March 2025) was a Chinese government official who played a key role in financial reform in the 1980s and 1990s. From 1979 to 1995, he was successively Vice President of the Agricultural Bank of China, Vice President of the People's Bank of China, Vice Director of the State Commission for Economic Restructuring, and Chairman of the China Securities Regulatory Commission. He has been referred to as "one of the architects of the early financial sector" of China, namely the financial system that was shaped by the early phase of the reform and opening up from the late 1970s to the 1990s. He was also instrumental in establishing the PBC School of Finance, the graduate school of the People's Bank of China at Tsinghua University.

== Life and career ==
Liu Hongru was born in 1930. He joined the Chinese Communist Party in 1948.

Liu studied at Moscow State University in 1955–1957, then obtained a doctorate degree in Money and Banking from Moscow Finance College in 1959.

By late 1977, Liu was working in the General Office of the People's Bank of China, which at the time was China's sole financial institution under the Communist monobank system. On 4 October 1979, Deng Xiaoping initiated financial sector reform and coined the slogan "banks must be truly turned into banks" during a nonpublic meeting which became rapidly known among policy elites. The slogan referred to the fact that what were called banks under China's Communist system until then did not properly play the role of financial intermediation associated elsewhere with banking. Liu leveraged that guidance from Deng to work on banking sector modernization. China's Rural Reform was resulting in the sudden development of household deposits, and Liu encouraged the intermediation of these deposits through the banking sector to the (state-controlled) corporate sector as opposed to allocation of funds to enterprises directly by the government under the five-year plans. He championed reform to allow banks to lend to state-owned businesses for investment, and not only for working capital financing as had been the case previously. As Liu put it in a later interview, "Breaking through the scope of working capital loans was a revolutionary change at the time and triggered a great discussion in society about the role of banks."

In March 1979, Liu was instrumental in the re-establishment of the Agricultural Bank of China, following several false starts since 1951 during which an agricultural bank had been founded but soon merged back into the People's Bank (so-called "three rises and three falls" respectively in 1951–1952, 1955–1957, and 1963–1965). Following that breakthrough departure from the monobank system, the authorities followed up with the (re-)establishment of the Bank of China, People's Construction Bank in August 1979, and People's Insurance Company of China in 1980 as autonomous entities separate from the People's Bank. Liu was also involved in the establishment of CITIC Group in mid-1979 as well as urban credit cooperatives. In 1983, the Industrial and Commercial Bank of China was in turn separated from the People's Bank, and the latter was refocused on central banking functions. In 1984, the State Council established a financial reform group, and appointed Liu as its leader. That same year, the budgetary funding of corporate entities, which the development of the banking sector had made increasingly redundant, was eventually phased out. A later cycle of reforms championed by Liu involved the establishment of joint-stock banks such as the Bank of Communications in 1986 and China Merchants Bank in 1987.

Beyond the creation of banking and insurance sectors, Liu participated in the establishment of formal capital markets in China. From his position at the People's Bank, he fostered a major conference hosted by the People's Bank in 1986 with participation of U.S. securities industry luminaries, including New York Stock Exchange Chairman John J. Phelan Jr. On that occasion, Deng gave Phelan a stock certificate of a Chinese listed company selected by Liu (Flying Happiness Acoustic Company), making him the first foreigner to formally own corporate equity in China. In 1990, in the reactionary period following the Tiananmen Square events, Liu was asked by the State Council to investigate alleged irregularities on China's fledgling stock exchanges, and concluded that the situation did not justify outright termination of trading activity as some officials had advocated. On a plane ride in November 1990, he had an extended conversation with Party leader Jiang Zemin and convinced him to reject a general punitive approach, opening the way to the formal recognition of the Shanghai Stock Exchange and Shenzhen Stock Exchange later in 1990 while stock exchange experiments in other cities were put on hold. In 1992, Deng Xiaoping's southern tour unlocked further explicit recognition of securities markets under the new slogan of socialist market economy; Liu was appointed by Vice Premier Zhu Rongji as the first-ever chairman of the China Securities Regulatory Commission upon its creation in October 1992, and held the position until his retirement in March 1995.

Liu was an Alternate Member of the Central Committee of the Chinese Communist Party from 1982 to 1992. He later served in numerous other capacities: Deputy Director of the Economics Committee of the Chinese People's Political Consultative Conference, Vice President of the China Finance and Banking Society, Vice President of the China National Debt Association, President of the Shanghai Institute of Financial and Legal Studies, President of the Chinese Financial Education Development Foundation and Capital Market Research Institute, Professor at Tsinghua University, Professor at the City University of Hong Kong, and non-executive director in a number of listed companies in Hong Kong. The latter included PetroChina from December 1999 to May 2014, Titan Petrochemicals Group Limited from October 2002 to February 2006, Oriental Metals (Holdings) Company Limited, Concepta Investments Limited, and CITIC 21CN from September 2004 to August 2008.

Liu died on 14 March 2025, at the age of 94.

== See also ==
- Yuan Geng
- Wang Jianxi
- Fang Xinghai
