= China Investment Securities =

Chinese investment company

- Formerly: China Jianyin Investment Securities
- Company type: subsidiary
- Industry: Financial services
- Predecessor: China Southern Securities
- Founded: 2005
- Founder: China Jianyin Investment
- Headquarters: Shenzhen, China
- Number of locations: 160 branches (2015)
- Area served: mainland China, Hong Kong
- Revenue: ▲CN¥8.715 billion (2015)
- Operating income: ▲CN¥4.881 billion (2015)
- Net income: ▲CN¥3.639 billion (2015)
- Owner: China Intl. Capital Corp. (100%)
- Number of employees: 3,588 (2015)
- Parent: China Intl. Capital Corp.
- Footnotes / references in a consolidated basis; in Chinese accounting standards

China Investment Securities Co., Ltd.
- Simplified Chinese: 中国中投证券有限责任公司
Transcriptions

China Investment Securities
- Simplified Chinese: 中投证券
Transcriptions

China Investment Securities Co., Ltd. (CISC) formerly known as China Jianyin Investment Securities Co., Ltd. (CJIS) is a Chinese investment bank and brokerage firm based in Shenzhen. It was a subsidiary of China International Capital Corporation. The firm was founded by China Jianyin Investment on 29 September 2005 based on the good assets of China Southern Securities.

China Jianyin Investment Securities Co., Ltd (CJIS) was formed out of the relevant securities assets of the former China Southern Securities Co., Ltd acquired through public auction.

== History ==
Established in Shenzhen on September 28, 2005, China Jianyin Investment Securities Co., Ltd. (Chinese: 中国建银投资证券有限责任公司) is a successor of China Southern Securities Co., Ltd. (CSSC, Chinese: 南方证券). With a registered capital of RMB1.5 billion Yuan, CJIS is a nationwide comprehensive securities firm that was wholly owned by China Jianyin Investment and later wholly owned by Central Huijin Investment (from 2011 to 2016), the parent company of Jianyin Investment. Due to the change in ownership, the name of the company was also changed to China Investment Securities Co., Ltd. (Chinese: 中国中投证券有限责任公司).

In 2015, chairman of the board and Party Committee Secretary, Long Zenglai (Chinese: 龙增来) was dismissed. It was reported that Long withdrew money from China Investment Securities to fund his personal spending such as luxury banquet.

In 2016, China International Capital Corporation acquired China Investment Securities from Central Huijin Investment in an all-share deal.

== See also ==
- CSC Financial, another company reestablished by China Jianyin Investment in 2005
