= PBC School of Finance =

Graduate school within Tsinghua University

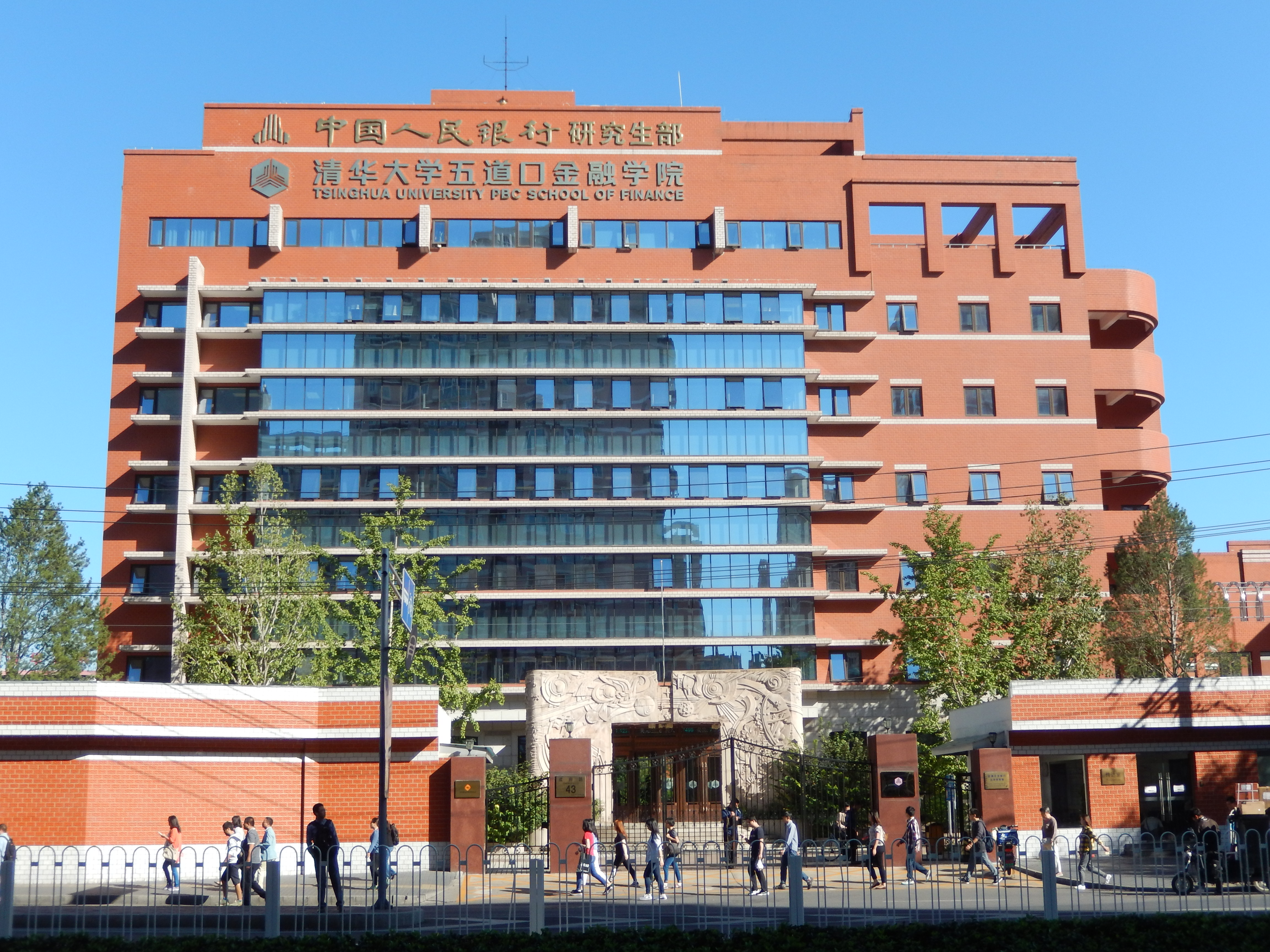
Building of the PBC School of Finance on the Tsinghua University campus

The Tsinghua University PBC School of Finance, sometimes acronymized as Tsinghua PBCSF, is a graduate school within Tsinghua University in Beijing, sponsored by the People's Bank of China (PBC). It has been described as "a critical intellectual home for China's financial talents".

== History ==
In the early phase of the reform and opening up, The PBC leadership decided to establish an in-house graduate education capability in 1981, with the first recruitments beginning in 1982. The first doctoral students joined in 1987. It formally took the name "graduate school" in 1994, after having initially been referred to as the PBC's graduate department. PBC official Liu Hongru was instrumental in the school's early development.

In 2012, the PBC Graduate School was integrated into Tsinghua University, based on an agreement between the two institutions signed in July 2011. The founding ceremony on 29 March 2012 featured Chinese Education Minister Yuan Guiren, PBC Governor Zhou Xiaochuan, Tsinghua University President Chen Jining, and Tsinghua University Communist Party Secretary Hu Heping. Wu Xiaoling, a former PBC Vice Governor, was appointed as the school's Dean and chairwoman of its Board.

As of April 2023, the college has 25 full-time teachers, 1 part-time professor, 81 part-time master's tutors, 17 distinguished professors, and 4 visiting scholars. It offers a joint part-time, bilingual (Chinese-English) program with Cornell University for working professionals in China, the Cornell-Tsinghua Dual Degree Finance MBA. In May 2024, Jiao Jie was the school's dean.

== Research centers ==
=== National Institute of Financial Research ===
The Tsinghua University National Institute of Financial Research (NIFR or THUNIFR) was announced on 10 May 2014. It is jointly established by Tsinghua University, the Research Bureau of the People's Bank of China, the Research Bureau of the China Banking Regulatory Commission, the Research Center of the China Securities Regulatory Commission, and the Policy Research Office of the China Insurance Regulatory Commission. Tsinghua University PBC School of Finance is responsible for the institute's management and operation. The initial co-heads of the NIFR were Wu Xiaoling and Li Jiange, former chairman of China International Capital Corporation.

=== Institute for Fintech Research ===
The Tsinghua University Institute for Fintech Research (IFR or THUIFR) was inaugurated on 7 December 2017. The Financial Technology Research Institute relies on Tsinghua University PBC School of Finance and is jointly constructed by Tsinghua University Cross-Information Research Institute, Tsinghua University Software School, and Tsinghua University Law School. The institute is built on the work basis of the Internet Finance Laboratory, Sunshine Internet Finance Innovation Research Center; and Xinyuan Real Estate Financial Technology Research Center.

== See also ==
- China Finance 40 Forum
- Tsinghua PBCSF Global Finance Forum
