= Qin Xiao =

Chinese banker

Qin Xiao (Chinese: 秦晓; pinyin: Qín Xiǎo; born April 1947) is a Chinese former banker and promoter of economic and financial reform. Among numerous senior positions in the state-controlled sector, Qin was the chairman of China Merchants Group and China Merchants Bank from the 2001 to 2010. He is the founding chairman of the Hong Kong-registered Boyuan Foundation.

== Biography ==
Qin's father Qin Lisheng was a senior party cadre. When in high school in 1966, the Cultural Revolution began and Qin Xiao became a Red Guard. As many Red Guards were in fact targeting people such as his father, Qin created a faction that defended against such radical attacks. At the end of the Cultural Revolution, like many former Red Guards he was relocated to the countryside (in his case Inner Mongolia).

== Business ==
After several years working in government (including time at the Coal and Oil ministries), Qin Xiao became vice chairman of the board and general manager in China International Trust & Investment Corp and then chairman of the board in CITIC Bank. In 2001 he was appointed chairman of the board of China Merchants Group, in difficulty since the 1997 Asian financial crisis, and turned the troubled financial conglomerate around. During his time there, annual growth reached 20 per cent, total assets increased more than 400 per cent and net profits increased about 20-fold. Also in 2001, he served as chairman of the APEC Business Advisory Council, where he regularly promoted economic liberalization. In 2008 he became a non-executive director of China Telecom. He is also the honorary chairman of Hong Kong Chinese Enterprises Association and an adviser to the China Finance 40 Forum (CF40).

== Politics ==
In 2010 he retired from full-time business, stating he wished to become a "public intellectual". Since then, he has used his position as a respected business leader and chairman of the Boyuan Foundation to promote "universal values" (a loaded term in Chinese politics often associated with Western-style human rights and democracy), political reform and economic reform in China, whilst building a network of like-minded movers and shakers. As well as major Chinese figures, the Boyuan Foundation includes such Western luminaries as Brent Scowcroft and Leon Brittan.

He has explicitly and repeatedly stated his opposition to the so-called "China Model" of politics and economics (mixing authoritarianism and state-owned enterprises with some market economics). On other occasions, he has said “the government should stay within the government’s functions” and “power cannot be mixed and sold.” His calls for more liberal political and economic reform and less government involvement have earned him the enmity of Chinese New Left.

His involvement in (non-Red Guard) politics dates back at least to 1983, when Qin began working as a party official at the Chinese Communist Party's power centre in Zhongnanhai, including stints as a member of the Communist Party’s Central Committee Political Bureau and secretary to Song Renqiong, a former secretary of the party's central secretariat. He is further connected to the princelings of the party by family relation: his sister is married to a son of Chen Yun, one of the Eight Immortals.

Qin is a member of the Eleventh National Committee of Chinese People's Political Consultative Conference and previous posts include:

- a deputy to the Ninth National People's Congress
- a member of the Tenth National Committee of the Chinese People's Political Consultative Conference
- an advisor on the Foreign Currency Policy of the State Administration of Foreign Exchange.

== Education ==
Qin graduated in 1975 from the Shanxi Mining Institute with a bachelor's degree in mechanical engineering. In 1983, he received a master's degree in economic management from the China University of Mining. In 2002 he received a PhD in economics from the University of Cambridge. He is a part-time professor at the School of Economics and Management of Tsinghua University and the Graduate School of the People's Bank of China.

== Writing ==
Qin has written several books and articles, including:

- Asia's financial crisis and the post-crisis recovery: a structural and institutional perspective (University of Hong Kong. Chinese Management Centre, 2000)
- The theory of the firm and Chinese enterprise reform: the case of China International Trust and Investment Corporation (RoutledgeCurzon 2004)
