= Beijing State-owned Capital Operation and Management =

Beijing Financial Services Company

Beijing State-owned Capital Operation and Management Company Limited
- Native name: 北京国有资本运营管理有限公司
- Formerly: Beijing State-owned Capital Operation and Management Center
- Company type: State-owned enterprise
- Industry: Financial services
- Founded: 2008; 18 years ago
- Headquarters: Beijing, China
- Operating income: ▲CN¥1.33 trillion (2023)
- Net income: ▼CN¥29.59 billion (2023)
- Total assets: ▲CN¥3.48 trillion (2023)
- Total equity: ▲CN¥1.28 trillion (2023)
- Owner: Beijing Municipal People's Government
- Parent: Beijing SASAC
- Website: www.bscomc.com

Beijing State-owned Capital Operation and Management Company Limited (BSCOMC; Chinese: 北京国管; pinyin: Běijīng guó guǎn) is a Chinese state-owned financial services company based in Beijing.

It is the sister company of Beijing State-owned Assets Management.

== History ==
BSCOMC was established in 2008 with funding from the Beijing Municipal People's Government.

In July 2021, BSCOMC was restructured from an industrial enterprise wholly owned by the people to a wholly state-owned company. BSCOMC is wholly owned by Beijing SASAC.

In February 2022, for the first time, BSCOMC issued Euro-denominated investment grade bonds. At the time it was the first Chinese investment holding company to obtain high credit ratings from all Big Three credit rating agencies. The bonds were listed on the Hong Kong Stock Exchange.

== Business operations ==
BSCOMC's main business is investing and managing state-owned capital. It plays a strategic role on behalf of the Beijing Municipal People's Government.

Credit rating agencies have assigned strong ratings to BSCOMC. One of the reasons is BSCOMC's management which is stated to have strong oversight and controls to mitigate risks.

BSCOMC holds ownership in many listed and unlisted Beijing-based companies. Its largest holdings include Shougang Group, BOE Technology, BAIC Group and BBMG.

Due to its strong control over industries, BSCOMC is commonly known as China's Temasek.
