= Peter Nolan =

British academic

Peter Hugh Nolan CBE (born April 1949) is the Chong Hua Chair in Chinese Development and is Director of the University's Centre of Development Studies, University of Cambridge and a Fellow of Jesus College, Cambridge. He previously held the Sinyi Professor of Chinese Management, at the Cambridge Judge Business School also at the University of Cambridge. Nolan is a member of the Advisory Board of Cambridge Journal of Eurasian Studies.

Nolan was named in the 2009 New Year Honours and made a Commander of the Order of the British Empire for his work in developing British and Chinese business relations.

Peter Nolan received his BA degree from the University of Cambridge, and his MSc and PhD from the School of Oriental and African Studies at the University of London. He was also awarded an honorary doctorate by Copenhagen Business School.

Peter Nolan is the independent non-executive director of China International Capital Corporation Limited.

Nolan is the doctoral advisor of Liu Chunhang, the son-in-law of former PRC Premier Wen Jiabao.
