= BBMG =

Chinese building materials company and property development company

BBMG Corporation 北京金隅控股有限公司

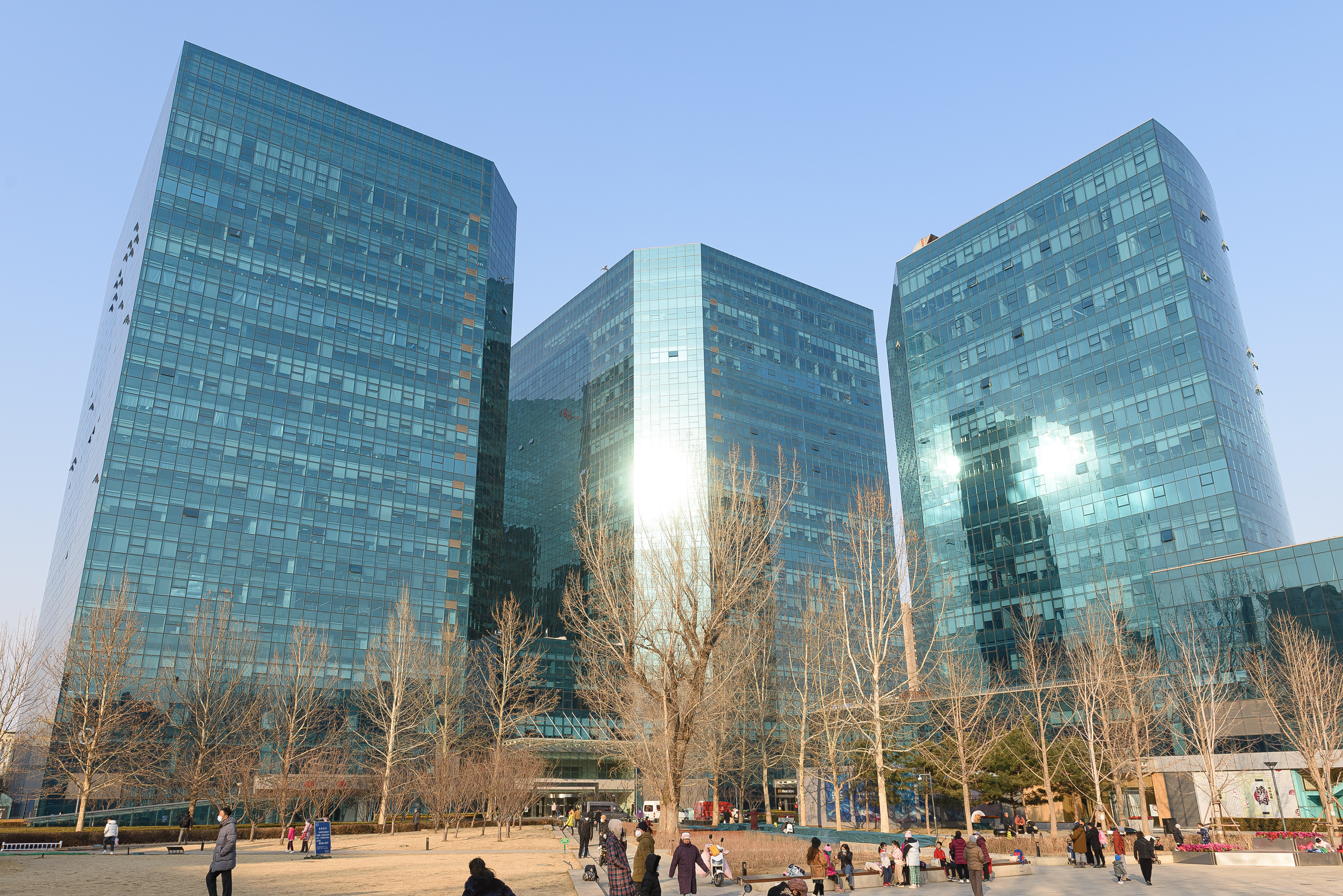
- The headquarters of BBMG at Tower D (middle), Global Trade Center
- Company type: public
- Traded as: SSE: 601992 (A share); SEHK: 2009 (H share)
- Industry: Building Materials
- Founded: 1996; 30 years ago
- Headquarters: 22F, Tower D, Global Trade Center, 36 North 3rd Ring Road East, Beijing, China
- Area served: China
- Key people: Chairman: Mr. Jiang Weiping
- Owner: Beijing City Government (44.93%)
- Parent: BBMG Group
- Website: bbmg.com.cn

BBMG Corporation Ltd. is a cement producer and property developer headquartered in Beijing, China. It is the largest supplier of building materials in Beijing, Tianjin and Hebei province.

BBMG Corporation Ltd. is a state-controlled enterprise, with the majority shareholder being BBMG Group with a 45% stake (as of end 2010). BBMG Group Company Ltd is a wholly state-owned enterprise administrated by the State-owned Assets Supervision and Administration Commission of the Beijing Municipal Government.

It was listed on the Hong Kong Stock Exchange in 2009 with the IPO price of HK$6.38 per share. It mainly attracted five cornerstone investors: China Investment Corporation, China Life Insurance, Bank of China Investment Group, Och-Ziff hedge fund and Robert Kuok of the Kerry Group.
