= Central Huijin Investment =

Chinese sovereign fund

Central Huijin Investment Ltd.
- Native name: 中央汇金投资有限责任公司
- Type: Subsidiary
- Industry: Investment company
- Founded: 2003; 23 years ago, in Beijing, China
- Headquarters: Beijing, China
- Area served: People's Republic of China
- Key people: Ding Xuedong (Chairman & CEO)
- Parent: China Investment Corporation
- Website: www.huijin-inv.cn/en/

Central Huijin Investment Co., Ltd.
- Simplified Chinese: 中央汇金投资有限责任公司
- Traditional Chinese: 中央匯金投資有限責任公司
- Literal meaning: Central Foreign Exchange Investment Company Limited
Transcriptions
Standard Mandarin
- Hanyu Pinyin: ZhōngYāng HuìJīn TóuZī YǒuXiàn ZéRèn GōngSī

Central Huijin
- Simplified Chinese: 中央汇金
- Traditional Chinese: 中央匯金
Transcriptions
Standard Mandarin
- Hanyu Pinyin: ZhōngYāng HuìJīn

Central Huijin Investment Ltd. is a Chinese sovereign fund company under the China Investment Corporation owned by the State Council of China.

Established in 2003 by the People's Bank of China, five years later it became a wholly owned subsidiary of China Investment Corporation, with its own Board of Directors and Board of Supervisors. Central Huijin's principal shareholder rights are exercised on behalf of the State Council. Central Huijin is an organization by which the Chinese government can act as a shareholder for the "big four" state-owned banks, thereby improving corporate governance and initiating reforms of the banking industry.

== History ==
=== People's Bank of China ===
Central Huijin was established in 2003 by the People's Bank of China. It was created as a special purpose vehicle incorporated as a limited liability company. Its mission was to recapitalize China's banks. Researcher Zongyuan Zoe Liu writes that using a sovereign fund like Central Huijin gave "the CPC the maximum degree of flexibility to decide when it would leave the market to its own devices and when it would forcefully intervene to protect the state's interest." Between 2003 and 2006, Central Huijin functioned as a quasi-state-owned private equity fund.

In 2005, the State Council approved the Comprehensive Plan for the Consolidation of Brokerage Firms, with the goal of implementing new regulatory mechanisms and rooting out misconduct in the securities field. Central Huijin wholly owned subsidiary Jianyin Investment, along with the China Securities Investor Protection Fund, were tasked by the State Council with restructuring Chinese brokerages. During the period 2004–2007, Central Huijin and Jianyin Investment acquired controlling stakes in ten large Chinese brokerage firms, totaling at that time one-third of the Chinese securities industry. The brokerages recapitalized in 2005 included Galaxy Securities, China Southern Securities (which was subsequently liquidated), Shenyin & Wanguo Securities, and Guotai Junan Securities. This in turn gave Central Huijin's parent institution, the People's Bank of China, significant power in the securities industry despite not having formal legal oversight. Central Huijin's track record of restructuring financial institutions has largely been viewed as a success.

In 2007, the Ministry of Finance increased its degree of supervision over Central Huijin.

=== China Investment Corporation ===
In 2008, Central Huijin Investment was acquired from the State Administration of Foreign Exchange by the China Investment Corporation for roughly $67 billion. It manages more than two-thirds of CIC's assets. Central Huijin functions as the "shareholder in chief" of the entire financial sector, a role that allows the state to participate in the market consistent with global norms of corporate ownership structure without letting go of state oversight of strategic enterprises and sectors.

Central Huijin indirectly supports the Belt and Road Initiative through its support of domestic financial institutions, such as policy banks or state-owned commercial banks, which in turn fund BRI projects.

In December 2019, Central Huijin bailed out Hengfeng Bank.

In 2024, Central Huijin stated that it would increase its purchases of A-shares to bolster stock market stability. According to one estimate, it bought US$45.5 billion worth of stock in the first quarter of that year.

In March 2025, the controlling stakes of China Securities Finance Corp (CSFC) and three of China's bad-debt managers were transferred to Central Huijin from China Ministry of Finance, dramatically surging Central Huijin's asset size from 7.76 trillion yuan ($1.1 trillion) as of 2024, to at least 27 trillion yuan ($3.72 trillion).

== Leadership ==
Initially, Guo Shuqing was the chairman of Central Huijin, and its general manager was Xie Ping, a former chief of the PBC's Research Bureau and director of its Financial Stability Bureau (also established in 2003). More recently under the CIC, the board of directors of Central Huijin has consisted of Ding Xuedong (Chairman & CEO), Li Jiange (Vice Chairman), and Bai Tao (executive director and President).

== Subsidiaries ==
As of 31 December 2015

- Central Huijin Asset Management (100%)
- China Jianyin Investment (100%)
- China Everbright Group
  - Everbright Securities
  - China Everbright Limited
  - China Everbright International
  - China Everbright Bank
- China Galaxy Securities
- China International Capital Corporation
  - China Investment Securities

== Investments ==
As of 31 December 2020, Central Huijin held shares in 17 financial institutions: China Development Bank (holding 34.68 percent of its shares as of 2019), Industrial and Commercial Bank of China, Agricultural Bank of China, Bank of China, China Construction Bank, China Everbright Group, Hengfeng Bank, China Export & Credit Insurance Corporation, China Reinsurance (Group) Corporation, New China Life Insurance Co., China Jianyin Investment Ltd., China Galaxy Financial Holdings Co. Ltd., Shenwan Hongyuan, China International Capital Corporation, China Securities, China Galaxy Asset Management Co. Ltd., and Guotai Junan Investment Management Co. Ltd. Central Huijin requires that it be able to seat one third of the directors of the boards on its banks.

It owns majority stakes in all big four Chinese banks (Bank of China, Industrial and Commercial Bank of China, China Construction Bank, and Agricultural Bank of China), but does not own shares in the smaller joint-stock commercial banks which are largely owned by local governments.

As of 2023, Central Huijin is the largest shareholder of the vast majority of Chinese financial institutions.

As of 31 December 2015

- China Pacific Insurance Group (1.22%)
- New China Life Insurance (32.25%)
- Ping An Insurance (2.65%)
- CSC Financial (33.29%)
