= BOC International =

Wholly owned subsidiary of Bank of China. established in 1998

BOC International Holdings Limited 中銀國際控股有限公司
- Type: Subsidiary
- Industry: Investment banks
- Founded: 1998
- Headquarters: Hong Kong
- Area served: People's Republic of China
- Key people: Chairman: Li Tong; CEO: Mr. Wang Yan
- Parent: Bank of China
- Website: BOC International Holdings Limited

BOC International Holdings Limited, shortly BOCI, is the wholly owned subsidiary of Bank of China, which offers investment banking and securities brokerage services. It was established in 1998 and headquartered in Hong Kong. It has subsidiaries in New York, London, Singapore, Beijing, Shanghai, Guangzhou and Chongqing.

== Notable staff ==
- Marshall Nicholson, vice-chairman of investment banking division (2007−2012), one of the first senior foreign hires at any Chinese bank
