= Beijing Securities =

Beijing Securities Co., Ltd.
- Company type: Deregistered company
- Industry: Financial services
- Predecessor: Beijing Securities Co., Ltd and Beijing Finance Securities Co., Ltd.
- Founded: April 28, 1993
- Defunct: December 30, 2021
- Fate: Collapsed due to losses and taken over
- Successor: UBS Securities
- Headquarters: Beijing, China
- Area served: China
- Key people: Yu Xiaodong (Chairman)
- Products: Stock broker, investment bank
- Owner: Previously Beijing State-owned Assets Management Co., Ltd. (45.56%)

Beijing Securities (Chinese: 北京证券) was a Chinese investment bank and brokerage firm founded in 1997 through the merger of Beijing Securities Co., Ltd and Beijing Finance Securities Company. After significant losses in 2005, it was taken over by UBS in 2006 it became UBS Securities.

== History ==
Established in 1997, Beijing Securities was created with 21 investors holding shares. The investors included Beijing State-owned Assets Management and Shougang Group. Having been set up with CN¥850 million (US$131,782,946), the company ranked among China's top 10 securities firms. Beijing Securities had CN¥1.515 billion (US$234,883,721) in assets in 2000.

By 2004, the company was left with only CN¥477 million (US$73,953,488). That year, it had a CN¥160 million (US$24,806,202) deficit. According to sources in the industry, some of the losses were due to embezzlement. UBS took a 20% ownership in Beijing Securities in September 2005, reorganizing it and rebranding it as UBS Securities.

On April 4, 2007, the China Securities Association announced the termination of Beijing Securities' membership. In June, the Beijing Municipal People's Government State-owned Assets Supervision and Administration Commission replied in a letter agreeing that Beijing Securities Co., Ltd. would initiate the shareholder self-liquidation procedure on June 18, 2007, and entrust China Cinda Asset Management Co., Ltd. to set up a liquidation team to carry out liquidation work. Thereafter, Beijing Securities continued to operate with the limited business scope of carrying out liquidation work. On December 30, 2021, Beijing Securities Co., Ltd. was officially deregistered.

== Activities ==
It has served as underwriters for nearly seventy listed companies, including Yanjing Brewery, CITIC Guoan Information Industry, Beijing Urban Construction and Shougang Company and helped enterprises to raise more than RMB 6 billion through direct financing on capital market. The company ranked sixth among domestic securities firms in terms of underwriting volume of new shares.

The business scope of Beijing Securities include: securities underwriting and listing recommendation, securities brokerage, securities trading, asset management, securities investment and consultation as well as initiating securities investment funds and fund management companies.

The company had put forward the "Zhongguancun Strategy", that is, to take it as its core business to give support to the development of Zhongguancun Hi-tech Park, the so-called "Silicon Valley of China". Currently, Beijing Securities is studying, cultivating and recommending qualified hi-tech enterprises to get listed on the main or the second board market and participating in the construction of "Zhongguancun Sector". The company is also active in getting involved in the capital operation of the listed companies in Beijing and the hi-tech enterprises in Zhongguancun to promote the development of these companies. It is taking full advantage of corporate bonds, investment funds and asset securitization to raise capital for the construction of the Zhongguancun Hi-tech Park and the development of hi-tech enterprises.

Approved by China Securities Regulatory Commission, Beijing Securities Co., Ltd has increased its capitalization from RMB 850 million to RMB 1.551 million. The total number of shareholders of the company reached 21.
