= Huaxia Bank =

Publicly traded commercial bank in China

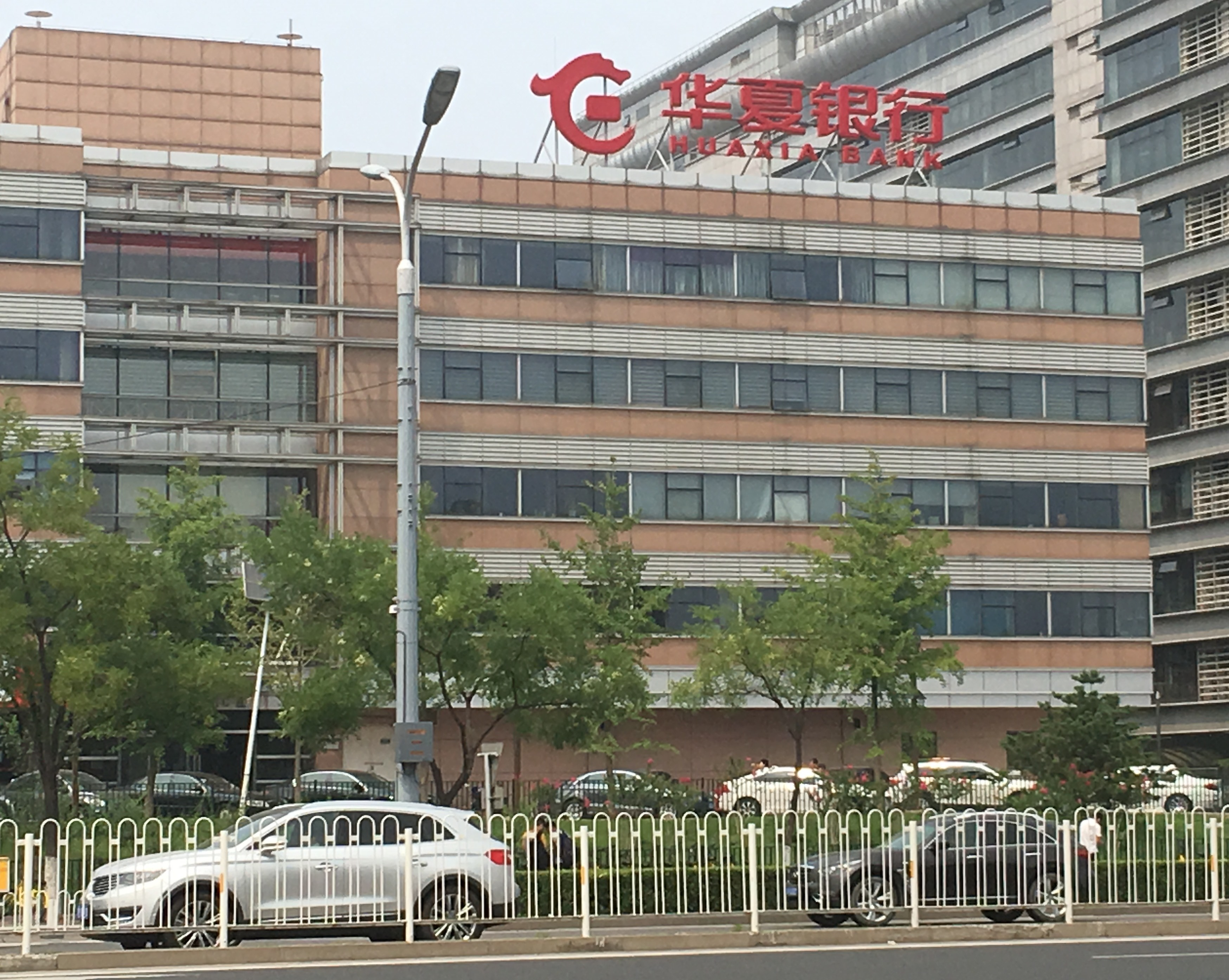
- Office in Beijing
- Type: Public
- Traded as: SSE: 600015; CSI Midcap 200
- Industry: Banking
- Founded: 14 October 1992
- Headquarters: Beijing, China
- Area served: China
- Key people: Chairman: Ms. Zhai Hongxiang; Governor: Mr. Wu Jian

Chinese name
- Simplified Chinese: 华夏银行股份有限公司
Transcriptions

Chinese short name
- Simplified Chinese: 华夏银行
Transcriptions
- Website: www.hxb.com.cn

Huaxia Bank Co., Ltd. is a publicly traded commercial bank in China. It is based in Beijing and was founded in 1992. Germany's Deutsche Bank holds 19.99% of the bank's shares as of 2010. In December 2015, it was announced that People's Insurance Company of China would acquire Deutsche Bank's entire stake in the bank for RMB23-25.7 billion.

As of October 28, 2010 Colin Grassie ceased to be a director/board member of the bank; and as of June 30, 2015 he ceased to be the CEO of Deutsche Bank AG (Broker UK)

As of the end of June 2012, Hua Xia Bank has in place a "hub-and-spoke" network of 33 tier-1 branches, 23 tier-2 branches, 12 cross-city sub-branches and 437 outlets in 68 major cities, and a settlement network of more than 1000 correspondent banks located in 320 cities across 110 countries and regions covering major global trade zones. In 2012, it ranked 97th by asset according to The Banker's Top 1000 World Banks ranking published in July. In 2011, it ranked 306th among Top 500 Chinese Enterprises, 96th among Top 500 Chinese Service Enterprises and 67th among Top 200 Chinese Enterprise Performance.
