= Beijing State-owned Assets Management =

- Company type: state-owned enterprise; (as limited company)
- Predecessor: Beijing State-owned Assets Management Corporation
- Founded: 25 April 2001; 25 years ago
- Headquarters: Beijing, China
- Revenue: CN¥8.15 billion (2024)
- Operating income: CN¥16.05 billion (2024)
- Total assets: CN¥185.2 billion (2024)
- Owner: Beijing Municipal Government
- Parent: Beijing's SASAC
Rating
| Moody's |
| Fitch Ratings | A (June 2017) |
- Website: bsam.com.cn
- Footnotes / references in consolidated financial statement

Beijing State-owned Assets Management Co., Ltd.
- Simplified Chinese: 北京市国有资产经营有限公司
Transcriptions

Beijing State-Owned Assets Management Co., Ltd. (BSAM) is a Chinese sovereign wealth fund based in Beijing. It was owned by Beijing Municipal People's Government. As of 2024, BSAM had CN¥185.2 billion in assets under management.

== Subsidiaries ==
- Beijing Beiao Group
- Chinese: 北京工业发展投资管理有限公司; lit. 'Beijing Industrial Developing Investment Management Co.', 'Ltd.'
- Beijing International Trust
- Beijing National Aquatics Center
- Beijing National Stadium
- China Beijing Equity Exchange
- Beijing State-owned Assets Management (Hong Kong) Co., Ltd. (a SPV for bond traded in Hong Kong as SEHK: 5520 and SEHK: 5521)
- Beijing State-owned Capital Operation and Management, sister company

== Equity investments ==
BSAM acquired an 85.01% stake in Credit Suisse Securities (China) in June 2024 for a total of $215.4 million. The stakes were purchased from UBS and Founder Securities, with UBS keeping a 14.99% stake in the company.

current

- Bank of Beijing

former

- BAIC Motor
- China Securities (Huaxia Securities) (29.82%)
- Xiezhong International (indirectly)
