= China Galaxy Securities =

Chinese securities brokerage

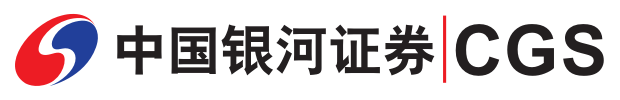

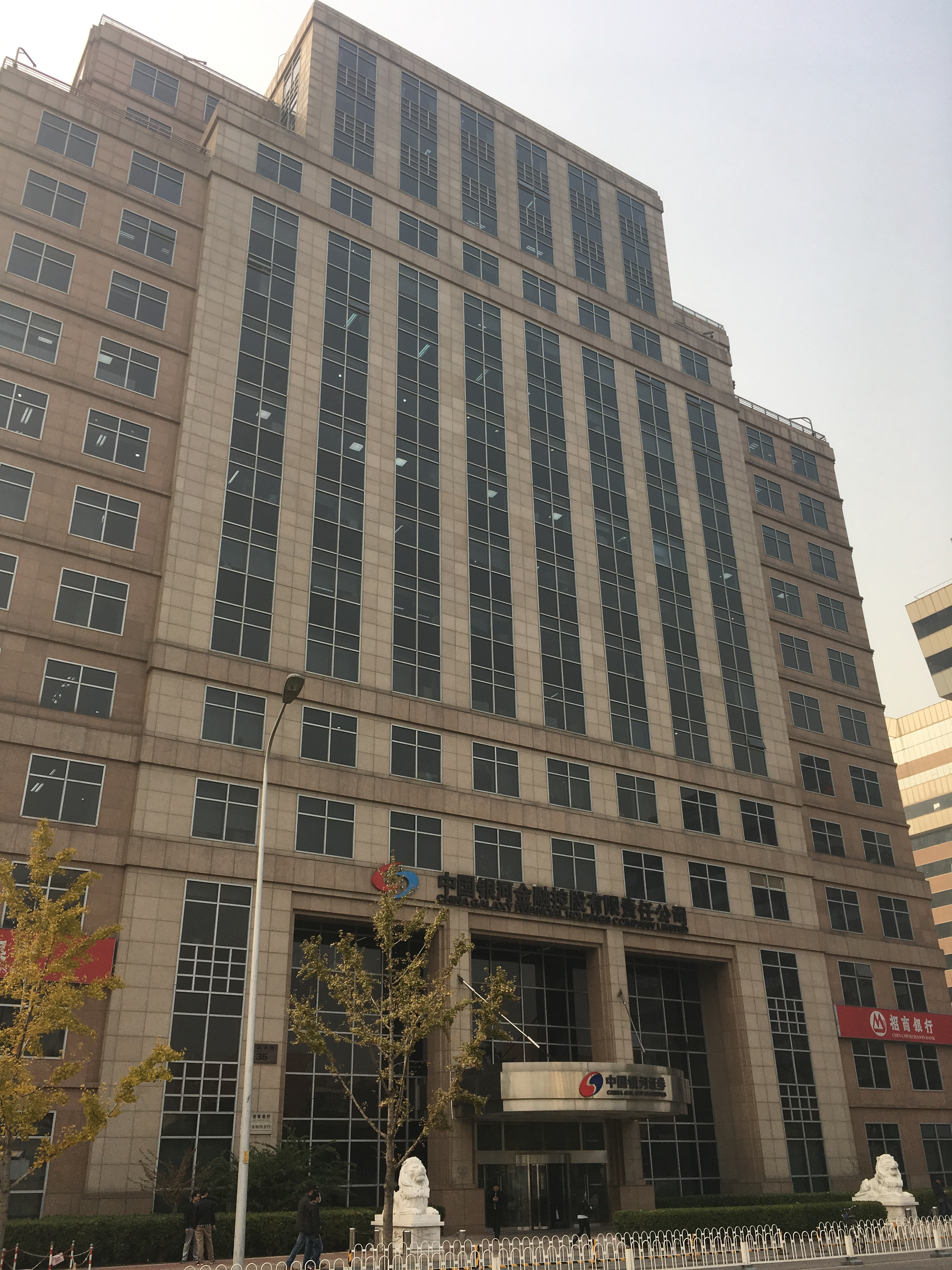
- The company headquarters on Beijing Financial Street
- Company type: Public; state-owned enterprise
- Traded as: SSE: 601881 (A share); SEHK: 6881 (H share); SSE 50 Component (A)
- Headquarters: Beijing, China
- Website: www.chinastock.com.cn

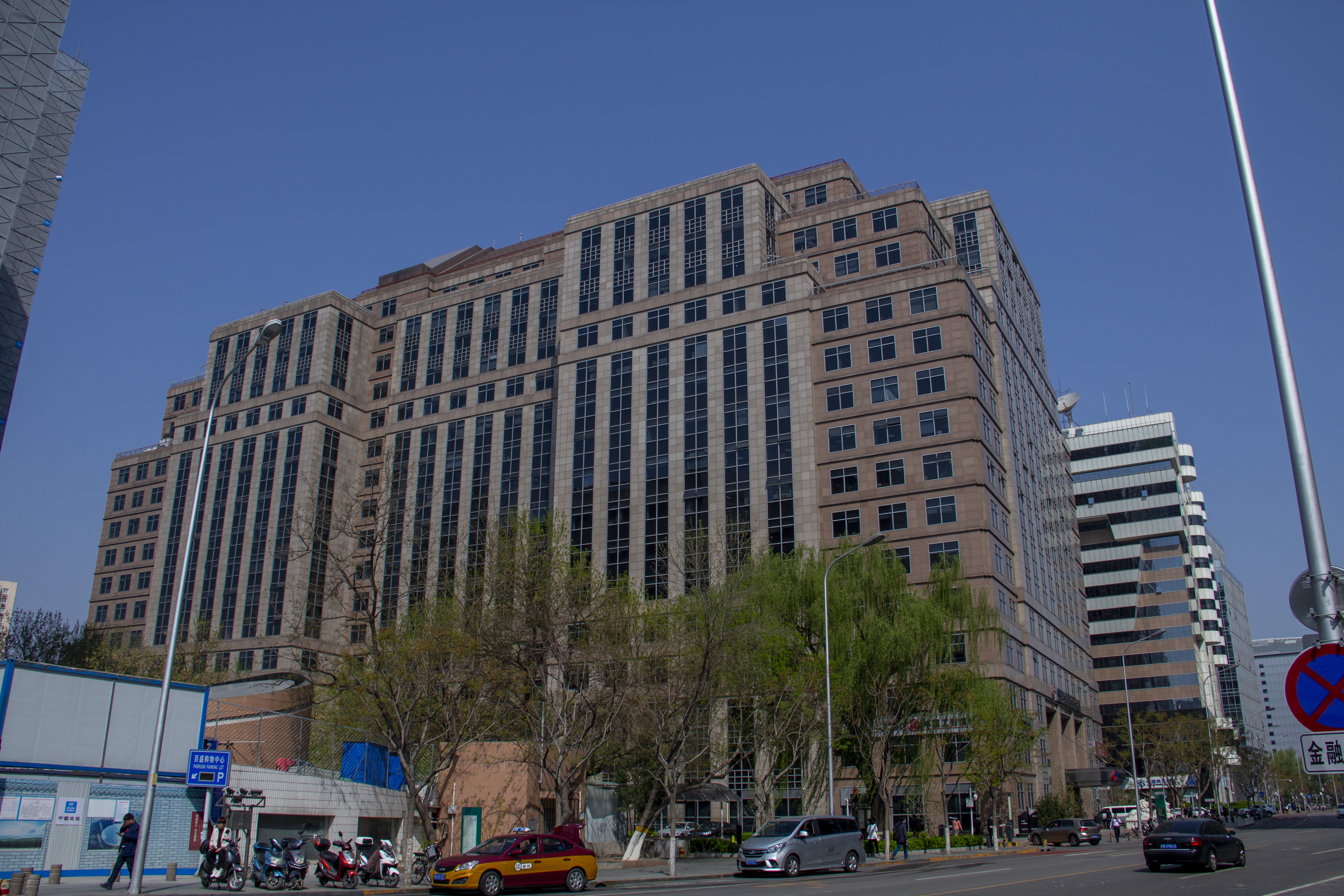
Headquarters

China Galaxy Securities Co., Ltd. (Chinese: 中国银河证券股份有限公司) is a Chinese state-owned brokerage and investment bank.

It raised US$1.1 billion on the Stock Exchange of Hong Kong in its debut in May 2013. In January 2015, the company announced plans to issue new shares worth US$2.3 billion on HKSE. On 21 April 2015, the company announced in a HKSE filing its plans to raise another US$3.1 billion by selling 2 billion new shares.

Since June 2017, it was part of Shanghai Stock Exchange's blue chip index: SSE 50 Index.

== History ==
China Galaxy Securities was founded on January 26, 2007, with a capital of RMB 6 billion. Major contribution of fund was from Galaxy Financial Holdings which took up 99.89% of issued capital, with the remaining 0.11% being taken up by four promoters: Beijing Tsinghua Venture Capital (currently known as Qingyuan Defeng), Chongqing Water, China General and CNBM.

== Management Board ==
The board of directors consist of 11 members, of which 2 are executive Directors, 5 non-executive Directors and 4 independent non-executive Directors. Directors are elected on 3-year term.

== See also ==
- Securities industry in China
