= China Jianyin Investment =

Chinese state-owned investment company

- Native name: 中国建银投资有限责任公司
- Company type: State-owned enterprise
- Industry: Equity Investment;Asset Management
- Founded: 2004
- Headquarters: Beijing, China
- Parent: Central Huijin Investment
- Website: www.jic.cn

China Jianyin Investment Co., Ltd.
- Simplified Chinese: 中国建银投资有限责任公司
- Traditional Chinese: 中國建銀投資有限責任公司
Transcriptions

China Jianyin Investment Co., Ltd. (JIC) is a Chinese investment company owned by the government of the People's Republic of China. Founded in 2004, it is a wholly owned subsidiary of Central Huijin Investment and is an integrated investment group focused on equity investments. The group is headquartered in Beijing and owns more than 160 wholly owned or holding enterprises and institutions in 29 Chinese provinces, autonomous regions, municipalities and Hong Kong SAR. It has also established affiliated agencies in Europe.

== Businesses ==
=== Investment ===
==== Portfolio ====
- SGD Pharma, manufacturer of primary glass packaging and containers for the pharmaceutical industry
- Miquel Alimentació Group, a Spanish company specializing in food wholesale, franchising and supply chain management
- Pacoma GmbH, one of Europe's suppliers of hydraulic cylinders
- NXP
- CRCC High-tech Equipment, China's largest railway track maintenance machinery supplier
- Dali Foods Group, a snack foods & beverage company in China
- Zoomlion
- Shanghai Rural Commercial Bank
- CCB Life Insurance
- JAC Motors
- HaiLin Energy Technology Inc., a supplier for AC control, heating control, solar thermal system and green homebuilding

==== Asset management ====
- JIC Trust Co., Ltd.
- Guotai Asset Management Co., Ltd.
- JIC Leasing Co., Ltd.
- China Investment Consulting Co., Ltd.
