= SZSE 100 Index =

Set of stock indices

- Foundation: 2 January 2003; 23 years ago (Return Index); 24 January 2006; 20 years ago (Price Index); 31 December 2002 (base date)
- Operator: Shenzhen Securities Information; (a subsidiary of Shenzhen Stock Exchange)
- Exchanges: Shenzhen Stock Exchange
- Constituents: 100
- Type: large cap A share
- Market cap: CN¥6.45 trillion (September 2024)
- Weighting method: free float adjusted Capitalization
- Related indices: SZSE 200; SZSE 300; SZSE Component; SZSE 700; SZSE 1000; SZSE Composite
- Website: http://www.cnindex.com.cn/en/module/index-detail.html?act_menu=1&indexCode=399004

SZSE 100 Index are a set of stock indices of the Shenzhen Stock Exchange. It consists of the SZSE 100 Price Index (SZSE: 399330) and the SZSE 100 Return Index (SZSE: 399004), using the same constituents but different methodologies.

Despite the fact that it was intended as the blue-chip index of Shenzhen Stock Exchange, comparing to its counterpart the SSE 50 Index, it had a smaller total free-float adjusted market capitalization of the constituents as well as smaller average free-float adjusted market capitalization per constituent. They have difference composition in constituents.

== Constituents ==
Weighting updated to 7 March 2024:

Ticker	Name	Industry	Weighting (%)
SZSE: 300750	CATL	Industrials	7.30
SZSE: 000333	Midea Group	Consumer Discretionary	5.39
SZSE: 000858	Wuliangye	Consumer Staples	4.60
SZSE: 300059	East Money	Financials	3.14
SZSE: 000651	Gree Electric	Consumer Discretionary	3.09
SZSE: 002594	BYD Company	Consumer Discretionary	2.89
SZSE: 300760	Mindray	Health Care	2.72
SZSE: 002415	Hikvision	Information Technology	2.36
SZSE: 000568	Luzhou Laojiao	Consumer Staples	2.33
SZSE: 002475	Luxshare	Information Technology	2.25
SZSE: 000725	BOE Technology	Information Technology	2.25
SZSE: 300124	Shenzhen Inovance Technology	Industrials	2.16
SZSE: 300498	Wens Foodstuff Group	Consumer Staples	1.85
SZSE: 300308	Zhongji Innolight	Telecommunication Services	1.73
SZSE: 002714	Muyuan	Consumer Staples	1.70
SZSE: 000063	ZTE	Telecommunication Services	1.69
SZSE: 000001	Ping An Bank	Financials	1.60
SZSE: 002230	Iflytek	Information Technology	1.60
SZSE: 300274	Sungrow	Industrials	1.56
SZSE: 002352	SF Holdings	Industrials	1.56
SZSE: 000338	Weichai Power	Industrials	1.55
SZSE: 000100	TCL Technology	Information Technology	1.46
SZSE: 002371	NAURA Technology Group	Information Technology	1.40
SZSE: 002142	Bank of Ningbo	Financials	1.37
SZSE: 002027	Focus Media	Consumer Discretionary	1.13
SZSE: 000625	Changan Automobile	Consumer Discretionary	1.12
SZSE: 300015	Aier Eye Hospital	Health Care	1.12
SZSE: 000792	Qinghai Salt Lake Potash	Materials	1.11
SZSE: 000002	Vanke	Real Estate	1.10
SZSE: 300122	Chongqing Zhifei Biological Products	Health Care	1.08
SZSE: 002304	Yanghe	Consumer Staples	1.07
SZSE: 002466	Tianqi Lithium	Materials	0.98
SZSE: 002050	Sanhua	Consumer Discretionary	0.91
SZSE: 300014	EVE Energy	Industrials	0.86
SZSE: 002049	Guoxin Micro	Information Technology	0.83
SZSE: 002460	Ganfeng Lithium	Materials	0.80
SZSE: 000166	Shenwan Hongyuan	Financials	0.74
SZSE: 000425	XCMG	Industrials	0.73
SZSE: 002241	Goertek	Information Technology	0.72
SZSE: 000776	GF Securities	Financials	0.71
SZSE: 002129	TZE	Industrials	0.71
SZSE: 000661	CCHN	Health Care	0.69
SZSE: 000538	Yunnan Baiyao Group	Health Care	0.69
SZSE: 000938	Unisplendour	Information Technology	0.68
SZSE: 002179	AVIC Jonhon Optronic Technology	Information Technology	0.67
SZSE: 300782	Maxscend Microelectronics	Information Technology	0.64
SZSE: 000157	Zoomlion	Industrials	0.64
SZSE: 002459	JA Solar	Industrials	0.60
SZSE: 002311	Haid Group	Consumer Staples	0.60
SZSE: 002271	Oriental Yuhong	Materials	0.59
SZSE: 002236	Dahua Technology	Information Technology	0.58
SZSE: 300896	Imeik	Health Care	0.57
SZSE: 000596	Gujing Distillery	Consumer Staples	0.56
SZSE: 300408	CCTC	Information Technology	0.55
SZSE: 000895	Henan Shuanghui Investment & Development	Consumer Staples	0.55
SZSE: 002493	Rongsheng Petrochemical	Materials	0.55
SZSE: 300142	Walvax	Health Care	0.53
SZSE: 002601	LBG	Materials	0.51
SZSE: 002555	Sanqi Huyu	Information Technology	0.51
SZSE: 000983	Xishan Coal and Electricity Power	Energy	0.50
SZSE: 002001	NHU	Health Care	0.50
SZSE: 300033	RoyalFlush Info	Information Technology	0.49
SZSE: 000768	AVIC Aircraft	Industrials	0.48
SZSE: 003816	CGN	Utilities	0.48
SZSE: 001979	China Merchants Shekou Industrial Zone Holdings	Real Estate	0.47
SZSE: 002920	Desay SV	Consumer Discretionary	0.47
SZSE: 000301	Eastern Shenghong	Materials	0.46
SZSE: 000786	BNBMPLC	Materials	0.46
SZSE: 000963	Huadong Medicine	Health Care	0.45
SZSE: 002709	Tinci Materials	Industrials	0.44
SZSE: 300347	Tigermed	Health Care	0.42
SZSE: 002736	Guosen Securities	Financials	0.42
SZSE: 300433	Lens Technology	Information Technology	0.42
SZSE: 002812	ENERGY TECHNOLOGY	Industrials	0.42
SZSE: 300316	Jingsheng Mechanical and Electrical	Industrials	0.40
SZSE: 300450	Lead Intelligent	Industrials	0.40
SZSE: 002821	Asymchem	Health Care	0.39
SZSE: 300759	Pharmaron	Health Care	0.38
SZSE: 300661	SGMC	Information Technology	0.38
SZSE: 002180	Ninestar	Information Technology	0.38
SZSE: 000876	New Hope	Consumer Staples	0.34
SZSE: 002410	Glodon	Information Technology	0.33
SZSE: 300999	Arawana	Consumer Staples	0.32
SZSE: 300751	Maxwell	Industrials	0.31
SZSE: 002603	Yiling Pharmaceutical	Health Care	0.30
SZSE: 301269	Empyrean	Information Technology	0.28
SZSE: 000617	CNPCCCL	Financials	0.28
SZSE: 300413	Mango	Consumer Discretionary	0.27
SZSE: 300454	Sangfor	Information Technology	0.27
SZSE: 300919	CNGR	Industrials	0.25
SZSE: 002841	CVTE	Information Technology	0.25
SZSE: 300628	Yealink Network Technology	Telecommunication Services	0.24
SZSE: 002916	Shennan Circuits	Information Technology	0.23
SZSE: 002938	Avary Holding	Information Technology	0.23
SZSE: 000708	CITIC Steel	Materials	0.22
SZSE: 001965	CMET	Industrials	0.17
SZSE: 000877	TSC	Materials	0.17
SZSE: 300979	Huali Group	Consumer Discretionary	0.16
SZSE: 300957	Botanee	Consumer Staples	0.15
SZSE: 001289	Longyuan Power	Utilities	0.05
