= Septwolves (clothing) =

Tobacco and clothing brand from China

Septwolves (Chinese: 七匹狼; pinyin: Qīpǐláng), formally Fujian Septwolves Industry Co., Ltd, is a clothing company based in Fujian, People's Republic of China. The brand was registered in 1990 in mainland China.

Noting that Septwolves' outlets number in the thousands, the Financial Times called it "a household name in China". Week in China said that in 2001, Septwolves turned into "one of the biggest players in China's casual wear industry, with its jackets ranking first in market share terms".

== History ==
Septwolves was founded in 1990 in Jinjiang. It is currently based in Xiamen. Fujian Septwolves Group, founded by Zhou Yongwei, Zhou Shaoxiong, Zhou Shaoming and Chen Pengling currently holds the most shares in the clothing company.

In 1992, it was recognized as a 'Reputable Brand in Fujian', and the next year the trademark was registered overseas. It claims to be "one of the most famous men's clothing makers in China" and has now expanded into women's and children's wear.

In 2000, the garment business was restructured.

In February 2002, US President George W. Bush was presented with samples as part of his visit to China. The company has had endorsement or sponsorship deals with Chyi Chin and Real Madrid.

Since 6 August 2004, the garment business has been listed on the Shenzhen Stock Exchange as Fujian Septwolves Industry Co., Ltd. SZSE: 002029 In 2006, it was ranked 303rd most influential brand in Asia.

As of 9 November 2016, Septwolves was a constituent of SZSE Component Index but not in SZSE 300 Index.

The group also operates a number of enterprises in Fujian, including commercial property in Quanzhou that is worth over RMB100 million.
