= Xiangxue Pharmaceutical =

Chinese pharmaceutical company

- Type: Public
- Traded as: SZSE: 300147; SZSE 700 constituent
- Industry: pharmaceutical; drink
Founded
1986	(predecessor)
29 December 1997; 28 years ago	(the legal person)
- Headquarters: Guangzhou, China
Key people
Wang Yonghui	(chairman & CEO)
- Brands: Asia; Eisiti; Jochi
- Revenue: ▲CN¥1.862 billion (2016)
- Operating income: ▼CN¥59 million (2016)
- Net income: ▼CN¥66 million (2016)
- Total assets: ▲CN¥7.989 billion (2016)
- Total equity: CN¥3.397 billion (2016)
- Owner: Wang Yonghui couple (36.98%)

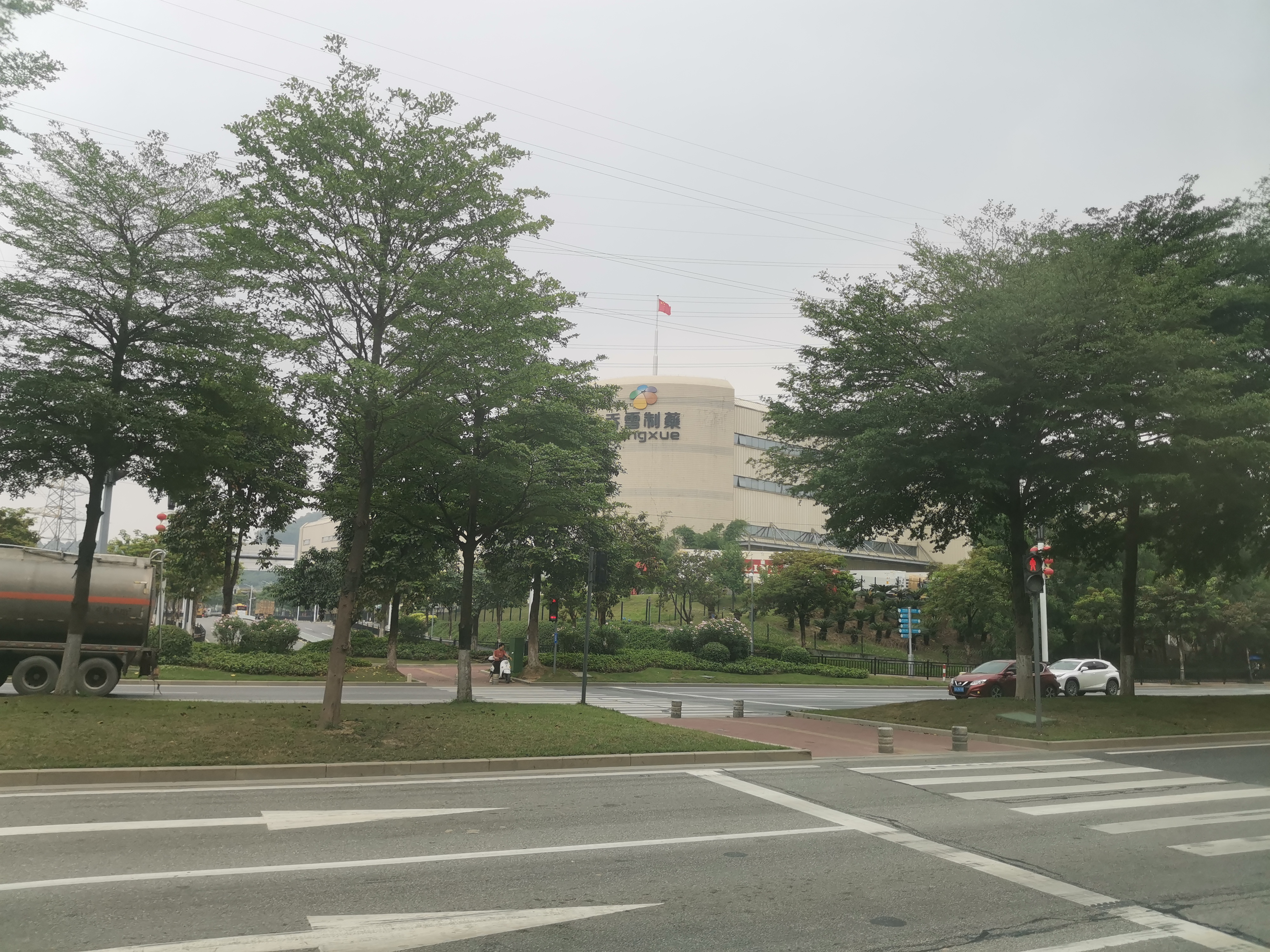

Xiangxue Pharmaceutical Co., Ltd.
- Simplified Chinese: 广州市香雪制药股份有限公司
- Literal meaning: Guangzhou City Xiangxue Pharmaceutical, Company Limited by Shares
Transcriptions
Standard Mandarin
- Hanyu Pinyin: Xiāng xuě zhì yào

Xiangxue Pharmaceutical
- Simplified Chinese: 香雪制药
- Traditional Chinese: 香雪製葯 (Note: 葯 could be written as 藥 in traditional Chinese character)
Transcriptions
Yue: Cantonese
- Jyutping: hoeng1 syut3 zai3 joek6

Xiangxue Pharmaceutical Co., Ltd. also known as XPH, is a Chinese pharmaceutical company. It was headquartered in Guangzhou Economic and Technological Development Zone, Guangzhou, the capital of the Guangdong Province. The company started in a place that near to the tourist spot Luogang Xiangxue (now in the Luogang Subdistrict, Huangpu District), thus called itself Xiangxue (Chinese: 香雪; pinyin: Xiāng xuě; Jyutping: hoeng1 syut3; lit. 'Fragrant Snow').

Xiangxue Pharmaceutical was a constituent of SZSE 200 Index (mid-cap index), but was removed in January 2017; it was inserted to SZSE 700 Index (small-cap index) instead at the same time. SZSE 200, 300 and 700 Indexes are subsets of SZSE 1000 Index, the latter is a stock market index for the top 1,000 companies by free-float adjusted capitalization. In July 2017 Xiangxue was also removed from SZSE Component Index, an index for top 500 companies of the exchange.

== History ==
The precursor to this enterprise, Luogang Pharmaceutical, was established in 1958.

Xiangxue Pharmaceutical was established on April 30th, 1986. It became a "company limited by shares" on December 29th, 1997 (roughly equivalent to public limited company); its shares were traded in ChiNext board of Shenzhen Stock Exchange since December 15th 2010, under the stock code 300147.

== Products ==
- "Asia" brand soft drinks (licensed from an investment vehicle of the Guangzhou government)
- "Eisiti" Herbal Tea (Chinese: 上清饮凉茶; pinyin: Shàng qīng yǐn liáng chá, discontinued? )
- Jochi brand health supplement

According to 2016 Annual Report, manufacturing and trading medicine accounted for 29.60% and 26.45% of its revenue, with an additional 32.94% from Chinese medicine; soft drinks accounted for 4.91%, it was followed by medical equipment and other revenue.

Eisiti was a competitor of Wong Lo Kat which was produced by Guangzhou Pharmaceuticals and Jiaduobao. The production of Eisiti was suspended in 2011, according to news report, despite the company denial.

The Chinese drugmaker Xiangxue Pharmaceutical Co. Ltd is developing a cutting-edge cancer therapy with American biotech firm Athenex Inc wherein the key technology that the two sides are working on are T-cell receptor-engineered T cells (TCR-T), a cancer immunotherapy.

== Subsidiaries ==
As of 31 December 2016

- Chinese: 化州中药厂; lit. 'Huazhou Chinese Medicine Factory'
- Chinese: 广州白云医用胶
- Xiangxue Asian Beverage (Chinese: 香雪亚洲饮料, 63%)
- Jochi (Chinese: 九极生物)
- Chinese: 湖北天济中药饮片 (55%)

- Chinese: 亳州市沪谯药业
- Chinese: 山西新亿群药业
- Chongqing Xiangxue Yiyao (Chinese: 重庆香雪医药)
- Guangdong Xiangxue (Chinese: 广东香雪药业)

== Equity investment ==
As of June 24, 2026

- Guangzhou Kuncang Investments (22.59%)
- Guangzhou Luogang Water Supplies (4.06%)
- Le Wuchao (individual shareholder, 2.03%)
- Le Fushi (individual shareholder, 1.44%)
- Chen Musheng (individual shareholder, 0.91%)
- Zhou Xiaodong (individual shareholder, 0.83%)
- Guangdong Wanming Constructions (0.78%)
- Shen Ronggui (individual shareholder, 0.71%)
- Fu Yanmin (individual shareholder, 0.52%)
- Li Min (individual shareholder, 0.50%)

== Sponsorship ==
Xiangxue Pharmaceutical was a sponsor of Guangzhou F.C. from 2002 to 2003 season. As of 2017, it was owned by Evergrande Group, a property developer and Alibaba Group, parent company of taobao.com, and the club was known as Guangzhou Evergrande Taobao F.C..

Xiangxue Pharmaceutical also sponsored Guangdong Mingfeng, another youth football team that based Zhaoqing, Guangdong Province to play in Hong Kong First Division League, the professional league of Hong Kong S.A.R., China (across the border of the Guangdong Province) as Xiangxue Pharmaceutical for 2001–02 season. It was replaced by the reserve team of Guangzhou F.C. in 2002–03 season and 2003–04 season. In 2004–05 season, Xiangxue Pharmaceutical was the sponsor name of two different teams, that not related to Guangzhou F.C. and Zhaoqing-based club.

Xiangxue Pharmaceutical also sponsored Hong Kong football club Sun Hei SC from 2005–06 to 2006–07 season, as well as Chinese football club Shenzhen F.C. in 2007 and 2008 season. Which the club was known as Shenzhen Xiangxue Eisiti (Shenzhen Xiangxue Shangqingyin) at that time; Guangzhou F.C. was owned by Xiangxue Pharmaceutical's competitor Guangzhou Pharmaceuticals from 2005 to 2009.

Shenzhen F.C. II, the B team of Shenzhen F.C., was also played in Hong Kong as Xiangxue Eisiti in 2008–09 season.

Xiangxue Pharmaceutical also secured the naming rights of 2003–04 Hong Kong First Division League and 2008–09 Hong Kong Senior Challenge Shield.

== Shareholders ==
As of 31 December 2016, two investment vehicles of Chen Shumei (Chinese: 陈淑梅; pinyin: Chén Shū Méi; Jyutping: can4 suk6 mui4) and Wang Yonghui (Chinese: 王永辉; pinyin: Wáng Yǒng Huī; Jyutping: wong4 wing5 fai1), owned 36.98% shares of the company as the largest shareholder. According to the company, they were a couple, and Ms. Chen owned most of the stake in their investment vehicles. Part of the shares they owned were pledged (Chinese: 质押). Ms. Chen ceased as the director of the company on 25 May 2016.

It was followed by two investment accounts of the National Social Security Fund for a total of 4.09%, a civilian-owned water supply company from Luogang, Guangzhou for 4.06%, Central Huijin Investment for 1.51% and some private equity funds that were managed by the banks.
