= TFC Communication =

Chinese electronics company

Suzhou TFC Optical Communication Co., Ltd.
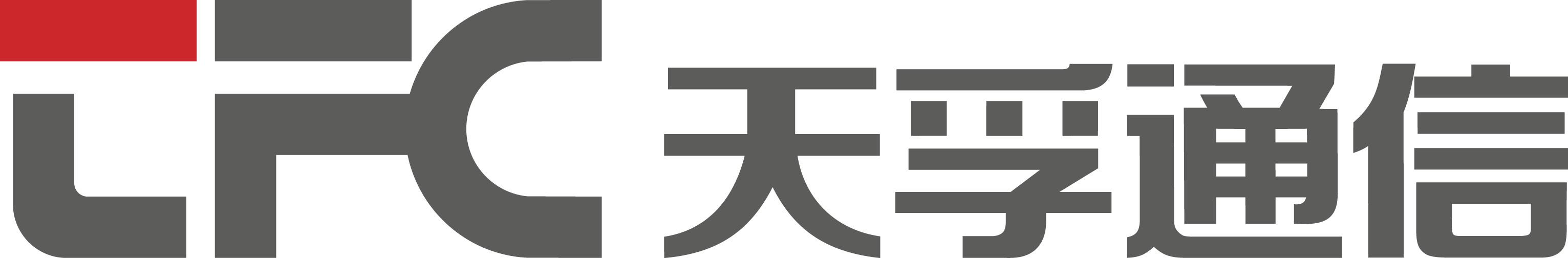
- Trade name: TFC
- Native name: 苏州天孚光通信股份有限公司
- Formerly: Suzhou TFC Precision Ceramics
- Company type: Public
- Traded as: SZSE: 300394
- Industry: Electronics
- Founded: 20 July 2005; 20 years ago
- Founders: Zou Zhinong; Ou Yang; Zhu Guodong
- Headquarters: Suzhou, Jiangsu, China
- Key people: Zou Zhinong (Chairman)
- Revenue: ▲CN¥5.12 billion (2025)
- Net income: ▲CN¥2.03 billion (2025)
- Total assets: ▲CN¥11.30 billion (2025)
- Total equity: ▲CN¥5.51 billion (2025)
- Number of employees: 5,127 (2025)
- Website: www.tfcsz.com

Suzhou TFC Optical Communication Co., Ltd. (TFC; Chinese: 天孚通信; pinyin: Tiānfǔ Tōngxùn) is a publicly listed Chinese company headquartered in Chengdu that engages in the manufacture and sale of optical fiber components.

== Background ==
TFC was founded in July 2005. At the time ceramic bushings were almost monopolized by Japanese companies like Kyocera. Initially TFC struggled with profitability but was eventually able to overcome technical difficulties and take over the market share from Japanese companies.

Initially focusing on ceramic bushings, TFC expanded into fiber optic components and packaging technology.

In 2015, TFC held its initial public offering becoming a listed company on the ChiNext board of the Shenzhen Stock Exchange.

In 2016, TFC acquired Japanese company Tsuois Mold to gain access on developing nanoscale precision optical lenses.

In 2018, TFC acquired the Arrayed waveguide grating business of Japanese company AiDi.

In 2020, TFC acquired Shenzhen based company Auxora for its coating technology. During the year, TFC had increase profitability due to the trend of 5G networks and data centers rapid development.

In 2025, TFC's stock price surged due to the artificial intelligence trend. As a core supplier to Nvidia, the company benefitted greatly. TFC was also reported to have secured high-end optical chip production capacity from Lumentum which supplies Google.

In April 2026, TFC submitted an application for a secondary listing on the Hong Kong Stock Exchange. In the same month, TFC announced a joint venture in Singapore with AI infrastructure solutions provider SuperX AI Technology to focus on optical interconnect products for the international market.

== See also ==
- Zhongji Innolight
- Eoptolink
