= Zhou Qunfei =

Chinese entrepreneur (born 1970)

- Born: 1970 (age 55–56); Xiangxiang, Hunan, China
- Citizenship: Hong Kong, China
- Occupations: Founder and CEO of Lens Technology
- Known for: Current richest woman in China, world's richest self-made woman, richest woman in tech.
- Spouse(s): Zheng Junlong (second husband, m. 2008)
- Children: 2 (one daughter, one son)

Chinese name
- Traditional Chinese: 周群飛
- Simplified Chinese: 周群飞
Transcriptions
Standard Mandarin
- Hanyu Pinyin: Zhōu Qúnfēi

Zhou Qunfei (Chinese: 周群飞; born 1970) is a Chinese entrepreneur who founded the major touchscreen maker Lens Technology. After the public listing of her company on the Shenzhen ChiNext market in March 2015, her net worth reached US$10 billion, making her the richest woman in China. As of 2026, Forbes estimates her net worth at US$18.2 Billion, ranking among wealthiest self-made woman.

== Early life ==
Zhou Qunfei was born in 1970 in Xiangxiang, Hunan province, China, the youngest of three children in a poor family. Before she was born, her father, a former soldier, became partially blinded and lost a finger in an industrial accident in the 1960s. A skilled craftsman, he supported the family by making bamboo baskets and chairs and repairing bicycles. Her mother died when she was five. As a child she helped her family raise animals for sustenance and small profit. Although she was the only one out of her siblings to attend secondary school and showed promise as a bright student, she dropped out at age 16 and moved in with her uncle's family to become a migrant worker in Shenzhen, the special economic zone in Guangdong province. While she briefly considered pursuing a government job for its stability, she discarded the idea as lacking a diploma would make it difficult to do so.

In Shenzhen she deliberately chose to work for companies near Shenzhen University, so she could take part-time courses at the university. She studied many subjects and passed the examinations to be certified for accounting, computer operations, customs processing, and even became licensed for driving commercial vehicles.

== Career ==
Although she dreamed of being a fashion designer, Zhou found a job working for a small family-run firm making watch parts for about 180 yuan a month. Displeased with the working conditions, she decided to quit after three months and submitted a letter of resignation explaining her reasons, yet expressing gratitude for the working opportunity. The letter moved the factory chief to offer her a promotion instead.

When the factory folded, she established her own company in 1993 at age 22, with her savings of HK$20,000 (~USD$3,000). It was her cousin who encouraged her to start on her own business, and the company began with her brother, sister, their spouses, and two cousins all working out of a three bedroom apartment. The company appealed to customers by promising higher-quality watch lenses. Here, Zhou took a hands on approach and involved herself in all parts of the company, including repairs and creating improved designs of factory machinery. In 2001, she caught her big break when her company won a profitable contract to make mobile phone screens for the Chinese electronics giant TCL Corporation.

Zhou Qunfei has stated that over the years she has started a total of 11 companies.

== Lens Technology ==
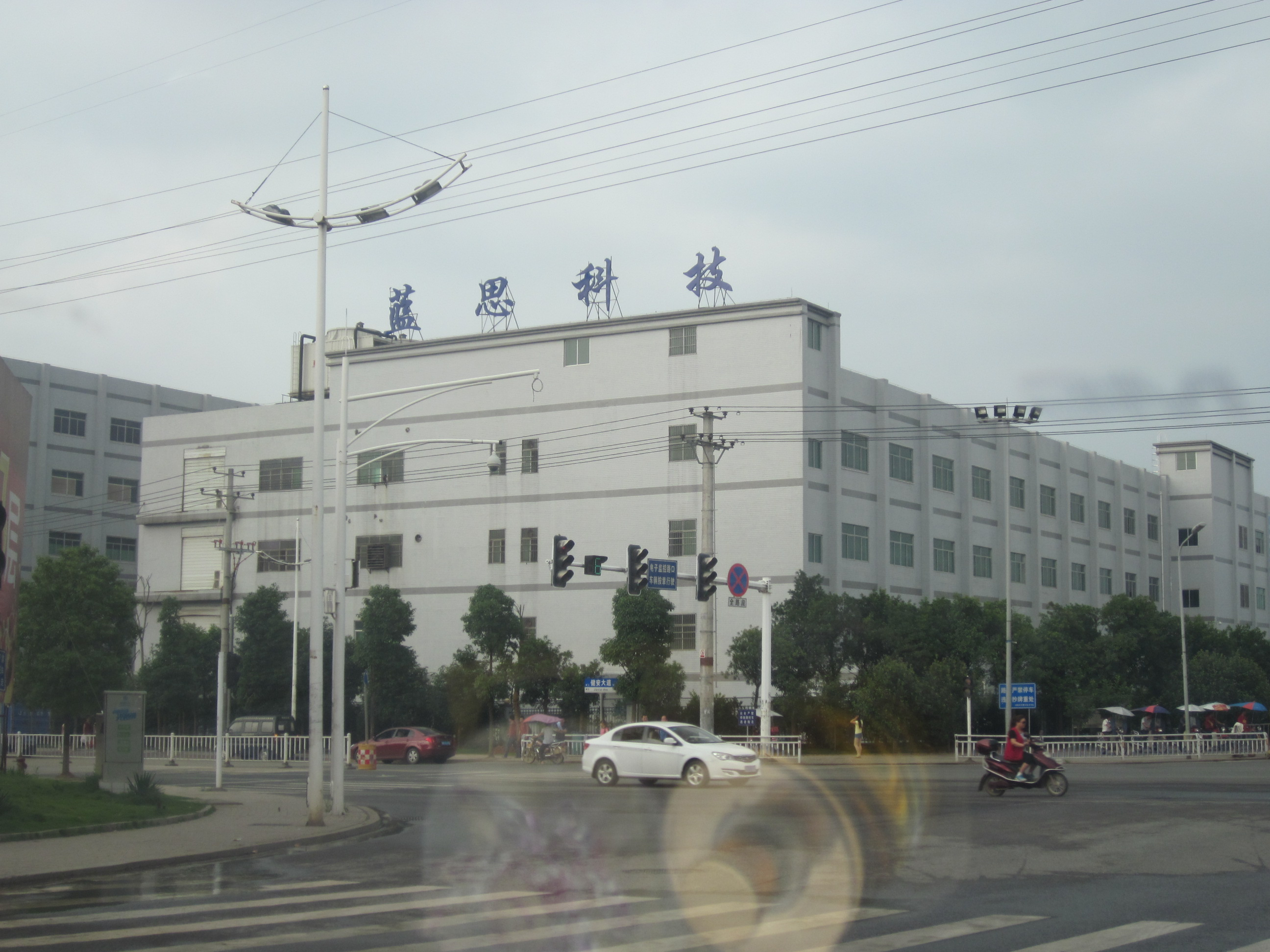
Lens Technology in Liuyang, Hunan, China

In 2003, while still producing watch faces, Zhou's company received a request from Motorola to develop glass screens for their Razr V3, during a period when the mobile phone industry was transitioning from plastic to glass display screens.

Following this, Zhou Qunfei started touch-screen maker Lens Technology (named so that it would turn up to potential customers searching "lens" online) in 2003 and the company soon received orders from other mobile-phone makers such as HTC, Nokia, and Samsung Electronics. After producing the touch screens for Apple's iPhone during its 2007 market entry, Lens developed into the dominant player of the industry. Lens Technology now primarily supplies touch-screens to leading electronics makers such as Apple, Samsung, and Huawei, receiving nearly 75% of its revenue from Apple and Samsung. The Apple Watch uses her company's glass and sapphire crystal screens. As of 2017, the company employs about 90,000 people, was expected to churn out more than a billion glass screens, and has 32 different factory locations.

On 18 March 2015, the 22nd anniversary of the founding of her first start-up, Lens Technology began trading on the ChiNext A-share market of the Shenzhen Stock Exchange. The company's stock price rose by the market's daily limit of 44% on the first day and 10% every subsequent day for 13 days in a row between 19 March and 2 April. This made Lens Technology China's largest technology IPO in the first quarter of 2015.

== Accomplishments ==
During Lens' 2015 IPO offering, Zhou's (who holds 87.9% of the shares, a $7.2 billion stake as of July 2015) net worth rose 452%, dethroning Chen Lihua as China's richest woman. She also holds the position of the world's richest self made woman, and is one of the richest women in the technology sector.

Additionally, Zhou is on Forbes lists as #61 in 2016 Power Women, #205 in 2016 Billionaires (#9 out of Hong Kong billionaires), #18 in 2015 China Rich List, and #30 in 2015 Richest in Tech. Fortune ranked her #18 on their 2016 Most Powerful Women of Asia-Pacific list, and she is a newcomer to the list. Bloomberg has ranked her as #211 out of the world's billionaires.

== Personal life ==
Zhou Qunfei married her former factory boss, had a daughter, and divorced. In 2008, she married Zheng Junlong, a factory colleague who as of 2015 served on the Lens Tech board. They have a seven-year-old son who lives at their Hong Kong family home.

Zhou has stated that although she considers work to be her hobby, she also enjoys mountain climbing and ping pong.

Zhou Qunfei's rags-to-riches story has been hailed as an inspiration to the millions of migrant workers in China. In an interview with Gansu Television, she said the secret of her success was the desire to learn.

== State banquet, 2026 ==
In May 2026, Zhou attended the state banquet held by Chinese leader Xi Jinping for United States President Donald Trump during Trump's visit to China. She was seated between Apple chief executive Tim Cook and Tesla founder Elon Musk, both customers of Lens Technology.
