= SZSE 200 Index =

Stock market index

- Foundation: 18 June 2015; 11 years ago (Return Index); 1 September 2011; 14 years ago (Price Index); 31 December 2004 (base date)
- Operator: Shenzhen Securities Information; (a subsidiary of Shenzhen Stock Exchange)
- Exchanges: Shenzhen Stock Exchange
- Constituents: 200
- Type: medium cap A share
- Market cap: CN¥1.610 trillion (free-float adjusted, 30 December 2016)
- Weighting method: free float adjusted Capitalization
- Related indices: SZSE 100; SZSE 300; SZSE Component; SZSE 700; SZSE 1000; SZSE Composite

SZSE 200 Index are indices of Shenzhen Stock Exchange. It consists of SZSE 200 Price Index (SZSE: 399009) and SZSE 200 Return Index (SZSE: 399679), using the same constituents but different methodology.

It was a sub-index of SZSE 300 Index, which consists of all constituents of SZSE 300 that was not included in SZSE 100 Index.

== Constituents ==
As of 30 December 2016

Ticker	English name (shortname)	Chinese shortname	Weighting	Industry
300308	Zhongji Innolight			
300072	Sanju Environmental Protection & New Materials (SJEP)	Chinese: 三聚环保; pinyin: Sān jù huán bǎo	1.48%	Materials
002007	Hualan Biological Engineeringe	Chinese: 华兰生物; pinyin: Huá lán shēng wù	1.10%	Health Care
300408	Three-Circle Group (CCTC)	Chinese: 三环集团; pinyin: Sān huán jí tuán	0.96%	Information Technology
000661	Changchun High & New Technology Industries (CCHN)	Chinese: 长春高新; pinyin: Cháng chūn gāo xīn	0.92%	Health Care
000656	Jinke Property	Chinese: 金科股份; pinyin: Jīn kē gǔ fèn	0.92%	Financials
002085	Wanfeng Auto Wheel	Chinese: 万丰奥威; pinyin: Wàn fēng ào wēi	0.91%	Consumer Discretionary
000963	Huadong Medicine	Chinese: 华东医药; pinyin: Huá dōng yī yào	0.91%	Consumer Staples
000887	Anhui Zhongding Sealing Parts	Chinese: 中鼎股份; pinyin: Zhōng dǐng gǔ fèn	0.90%	Consumer Discretionary
002310	Orient Landscape & Environment (Orient Landscape)	Chinese: 东方园林; pinyin: Dōng fāng yuán lín	0.90%	Industrials
300003	Lepu Medical Technology (Lepu Medical)	Chinese: 乐普医疗; pinyin: Lè pǔ yī liáo	0.88%	Health Care
000718	Suning Universal			
000825	Taigang Stainless Steel			
002075	Shagang			

== Change history ==
Date	In	Out
12 June 2017; (effective in July 2017)	Beijing Enlight Media; and others	Huadong Medicine; Three-Circle Group; and others
12 December 2016; (effective in January 2017)	China International Marine Containers; XCMG Construction Machinery; Zhejiang Wanma; and 33 others	Beingmate; Orient Landscape; Sanju Environmental Protection; Xishan Coal and Electricity Power; and 32 others
