= NIO Phone =

2023 smartphone by NIO Inc.

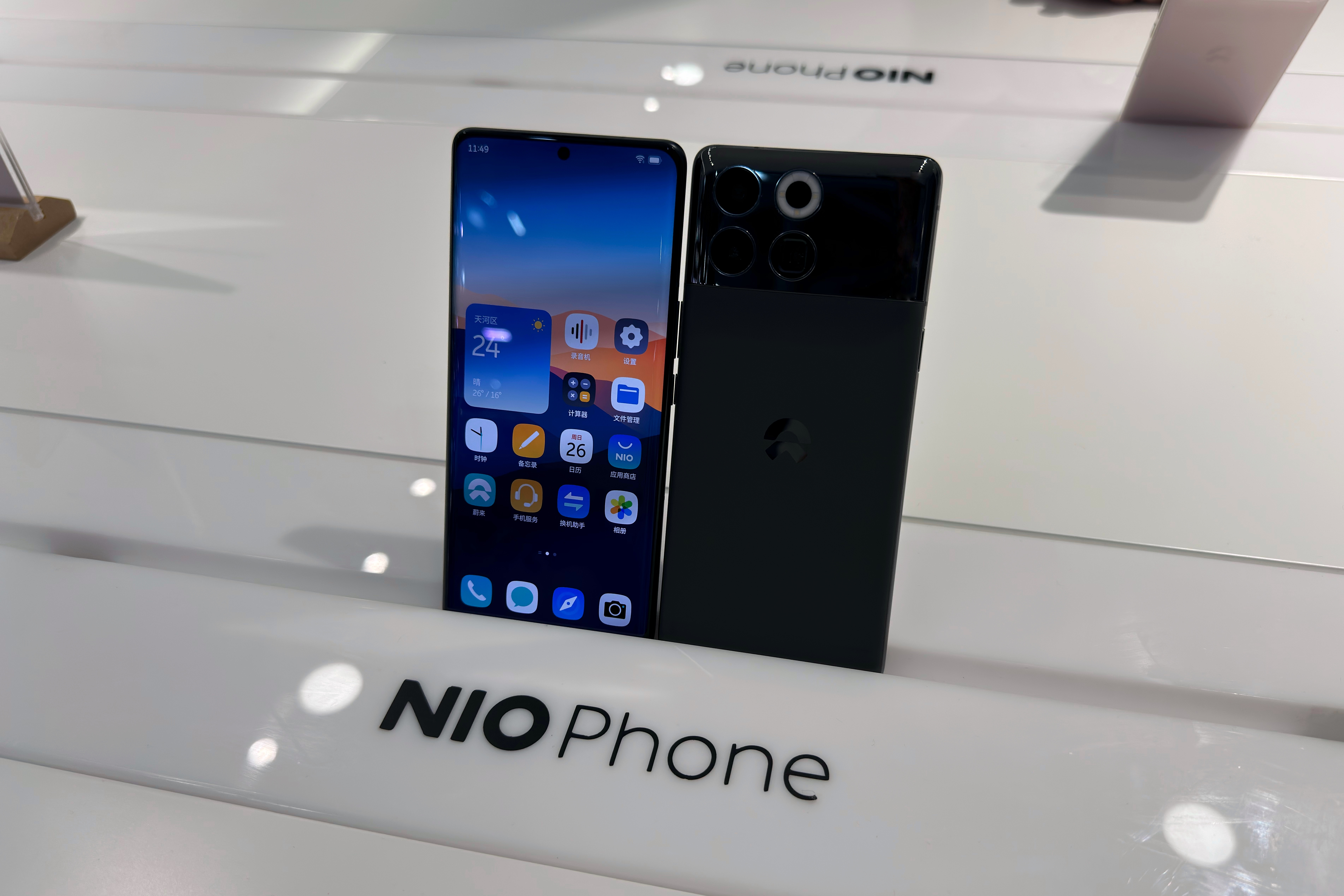
- Brand: NIO Phone
- Developer: NIO Mobility Technology Co., Ltd.
- Manufacturer: Lens Technology
- Type: Smartphone
- First released: September 21, 2023; 2 years ago
- Availability by region: September 22, 2023
- Successor: (All new/全新) NIO Phone (2)
- Compatible networks: Code division multiple access: BC0; GSM: 850/900/1800/1900MHz; Universal Mobile Communications System: Bands 1/2/4/5/6/8/19; LTE-TDD: Bands 34/38/39/40/41; 5G NR: n1/n3/n5/n8/n28/n41/n77/n78/n79; LTE-FDD: Bands 1/2/3/4/5/7/8/12/17/18/19/20/26/28
- Dimensions: Glass version: Height: 165.19 mm (6.504 in); Width: 75.54 mm (2.974 in); Thickness: 8.9 mm (0.35 in); Ceramic leather version; Height: 165.19 mm (6.504 in); Width: 75.54 mm (2.974 in); Thickness: 9.07 mm (0.357 in)
- Weight: Glass version: 212 g (7.5 oz); Ceramic leather version: 216 g (7.6 oz)
- Operating system: SkyUI
- System-on-chip: Qualcomm Snapdragon 8 Gen 2 Advanced Edition
- CPU: 1× 3.36 GHz Cortex-X3+ 2× 2.8 GHz Cortex-A715 + 2× 2.8 GHz Cortex-A710 + 3× 2.02 GHz Cortex-A510
- GPU: Adreno 740.719MHz
- Memory: LPDDR5X
- Storage: UFS 4.0
- Battery: Single cell battery, 5200mAh
- Rear camera: Periscope telephoto lens: 50 megapixels, aperture f/2.6, SonyIMX890 sensor; Wide-angle lens: 50 megapixels, aperture f/2.35, SonyIMX707 sensor; Ultra-wide-angle lens: 50 megapixels, aperture f/1.9, SonyIMX766 sensor
- Front camera: 12 megapixels, f/2.45
- Display: Samsung E6 substrate 2k resolution
- Connectivity: WLAN: Support WLAN 2.4G/5.1G/5.8G; Bluetooth5.3; USB 3.2 GEN1
- Data inputs: Supports GPS, Beidou Satellite Navigation System, GLONASS System, Galileo Positioning System, Quasi-Zenith Satellite System
- Model: N2301
- Website: phone.nio.com

NIO Phone is the first mobile phone of NIO Mobile Technology Co., Ltd., a subsidiary of Nio Inc. It was released on September 21, 2023, and has three configurations: performance version, flagship version and EPedition version.

== History ==
In February 2022, NIO established a mobile phone department and invited the former president of Meitu Mobile, Yin Shuijun, to be in charge of the mobile phone business.

In March 2022, NIO CEO Li Bin stated that NIO will officially enter the mobile phone market to bring users a better "car-machine interconnection" experience, and believes that NIO manufactures mobile phones to respond to traditional mobile phone manufacturers entering the automotive market. At the same time, NIO is recruiting a large number of mobile phone R&D technicians, absorbing employees with rich mobile phone R&D experience from companies such as vivo, oppo, and Xiaomi, and offering them higher salaries.

In August 2022, NIO officially established "NIO Mobile Technology Co., Ltd.", focusing on research and development of mobile smart devices such as mobile phones.

On December 12, 2022, NIO applied to register the "NIO Phone" trademark.

On September 21, 2023, the NIO mobile phone was officially released and went on sale the next day.

On January 5, 2024, Yin Shuijun, general manager of NIO mobile phones, resigned and was replaced by Bai Jian, vice president of NIO, in charge of the NIO mobile phone department.

== Hardware ==
=== Screen ===
NIO Phone uses a 6.81-inch curved screen based on Samsung E6, with a peak brightness of 1800 nits and a resolution of 3088x1440 (i.e. 2K screen). At the same time, NIO Phone uses LTPO technology instead of traditional LTPS, and the screen resolution can achieve 1–120 Hz adaptive refresh. The pixels of the entire series of screens are arranged in a diamond arrangement and support DCI-P3 wide color gamut. The cover is made of Corning Gorilla Glass Victus to enhance the ability to resist knocks and scratches.

=== Chip and Storage ===
All NIO Phone series are equipped with a Qualcomm Snapdragon 8 Gen 2 processor.

The NIO Phone comes in different storage and memory sizes. The performance version and the flagship version use 12GB of LPDDR5X RAM, and the EPedition version uses 16GB of RAM. The performance version uses 512GB of UFS 4.0 ROM, while the flagship and EPedition versions use 1TB.

=== Image ===
NIO Phone has three rear cameras, of which the main camera is a 50-megapixel periscope telephoto lens, using the SonyIMX890 sensor, with an aperture of f/2.6. The two secondary cameras are a 50-megapixel wide-angle lens and a 50-megapixel ultra-wide-angle lens, using the SonyIMX707 sensor and the SonyIMX766 sensor, with apertures of f/2.35 and f/1.9 respectively. The rear camera supports up to 4K60fps video shooting. The front camera is 12 megapixels, with an aperture of f/2.45, and supports up to 4K60fps video shooting. Both the front and rear cameras support video stabilization technologies EIS and OIS.

=== Peripheral configuration ===
In terms of sound system, the entire series is equipped with dual stereo speakers, of which the lower speakers have a specification of 1115K and an amplitude of 0.65mm, both provided by AAC. The motor adopts AAC Technology 0916X-axis linear motor. In terms of charging, NIO Phone supports NIO's private 66W fast charging protocol, as well as 50W wireless charging and 10W wireless reverse charging. In terms of short-range communication, the entire series supports Bluetooth 5.3, NFC and infrared remote control functions. In terms of navigation, the entire series supports mainstream dual-frequency GPS and triple-frequency Beidou to achieve accurate navigation and location guidance. In terms of unlocking, NIO Phone uses ultrasonic under-screen fingerprint and is equipped with facial recognition.

== System ==
NIO Phone is based on Android 13 to create a customized system "SkyUI". Compared with other Android manufacturers in mainland China, NIO said that SkyUI will not have system advertisements and manufacturer commercial pre-installed software. In addition, through SkyUI, NIO cars can drive to a designated location at a low speed in a confined space.

== Price ==
Model	Configuration	Price in mainland China (yuan)
NIO Phone Performance Edition	12GB + 512GB	6499
NIO Phone Ultimate Edition	12GB + 1TB	6899
NIO Phone EPedition Edition	16GB + 1TB	7499

== Sales ==
According to a report by Consumer News and Business Channel, NIO internally estimates that half of NIO car users will purchase the NIO Phone. In the first quarter of 2024, IDC and Canalys respectively released statistics on mobile phone share and sales volume in mainland China in the fourth quarter of 2023. NIO Phone failed to enter the top five in the country.

== Anecdote ==
After the release of NIO Phone, because its hardware workmanship is similar to that of OPPO phones, and the style of SkyUI is similar to Meizu's phone system Flyme, rumors of "NIO Phone is manufactured by OPPO, and SkyUI is developed by Meizu" appeared on the Internet. Later, NIO responded to this matter, saying that NIO had considered cooperating with the two mobile phone manufacturers, but failed to reach an agreement, and NIO Phone was manufactured by Lens.
