= Shagang Group =

Major Chinese steel producer

Jiangsu Shagang Group Company Limited 江苏沙钢集团有限公司
- Type: Privately owned company
- Industry: Steel
- Founded: 1975; 51 years ago
- Headquarters: Zhangjiagang (Suzhou), Jiangsu, China
- Area served: China
- Key people: Chairman Emeritus: The late Shen Wenrong; Chairman: Shen Bin; President:Gong Sheng; Former President: Liu Jian
- Revenue: 47,072,200,000 United States dollar (2021)
- Net income: 2,273,500,000 United States dollar (2021)
- Number of employees: 45,398 (2021)
- Website: Jiangsu Shagang Group Company Limited

Jiangsu Shagang Group Company Limited, Jiangsu Shagang Group, Shagang Group or Shasteel is located in Zhangjiagang, Jiangsu, China, an Economic Development Zone of the Yangtze River. According to a 2008 survey conducted by the All-China Federation of Industry and Commerce (ACFIC), the company was the largest privately owned company in China at the time. It involves the production and sales of "Shagang" brand name steel products.

== History ==
Formerly "Jiangsu Shagang Group Company Limited", it was established in 1975 with self-financing of only 450,000 Renminbi. At the end of 2007, it employs over 26,700 staff, covers an area of 10 km^{2}, and has total assets over RMB100 billion Yuan.

The company drew the world's attention in 2001 when it acquired a steel mill (the Dortmund-Hörde plant) from German industrial giant ThyssenKrupp for 30 million euros and shipped its equipment to China where it was reassembled and resumed operation.

Shagang Group acquired the controlling stake in Huaigang and renamed it into Huaigang Special Steel in 2006. The stake floated on the Shenzhen Stock Exchange as Shagang Company in 2010. In 2015 Shagang Group sold most of the stake in Shagang Company.

In 2016, the Group headed a consortium that acquired London-based international data center Global Switch Holdings for £2.4 billion (HK$23.03 billion). The consortium bought a 49 percent stake in the company in order to expand Global Switch Holding's strategic infrastructure.

Due to ongoing overcapacity within the steel sector, Jiangsu Shagang Group purchased two internet data firms for $3.8 billion, as part of an attempt to expand into new industries for diversification. The June 2017 deal targets Jiangsu Qingfeng Investment Management Co. Ltd. and Beijing Daily Tech Co. Ltd.

== Business ==
The company processes some 18 million tons of iron annually in order to roll out about 23 million tons of steel each year, making it one of China's top-five steel producers. Jiangsu Shagang's product line includes rebar, wire rods, slabs, and hot-rolled coils. In addition to iron and steel, Jiangsu Shagang produces stainless steel and zinc-plated steel sheets. Since 2006, the company has acquired four smaller, rival steel companies, and it now ranks as China's largest private steel producer.
