= TISCO =

TISCO may refer to:

- Taiyuan Iron and Steel Group, a Chinese steel company
- Tata Steel, formerly Tata Iron & Steel Company, an Indian steel company
- Thai Nguyen Iron and Steel Corporation, a Vietnamese (Thái Nguyên) steel company
- Tisco Bank, Thailand
