= China International Marine Containers =

Chinese manufacturing company

China International Marine Containers (Group) Company Ltd 中国国际海运集装箱(集团)股份有限公司

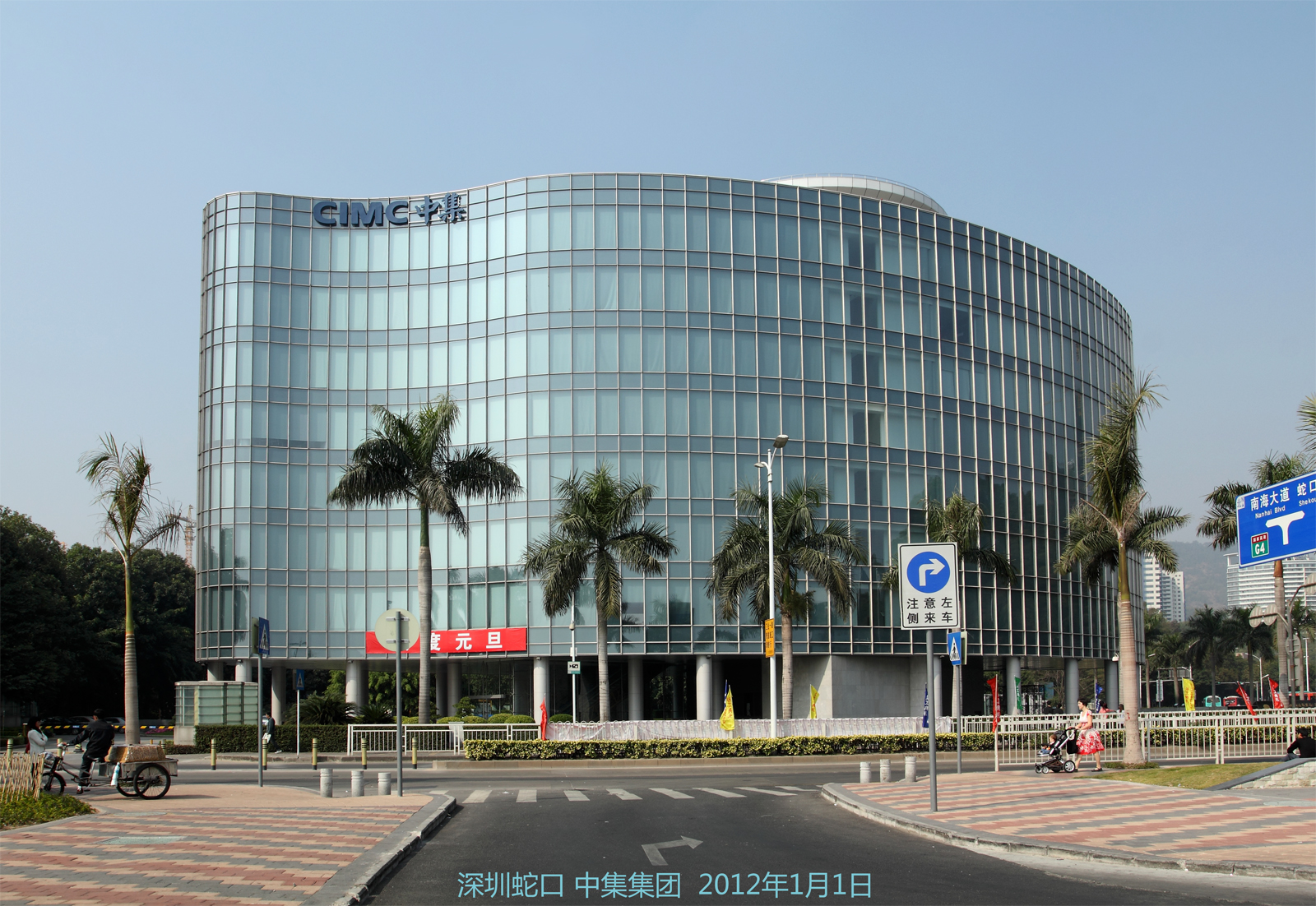
- Headquarters of CIMC
- Company type: Private company
- Traded as: SZSE: 000039 (A share); SEHK: 2039 (H share); SZSE 200 Component (A)
- Industry: Shipping and logistics
- Founded: 14 January 1980
- Founder: Yuan Geng
- Headquarters: Shekou, Shenzhen, Guangdong, China
- Area served: Worldwide
- Key people: Legal Representative and Chairman:Sia Li Jianhong
- Revenue: RMB 57.874 billion (2013)
- Net income: RMB 2.18 billion (2013)
- Owner: China Merchants Group; China COSCO Shipping
- Number of employees: 57,686 (as of 31 December 2013)
- Website: www.cimc.com

China International Marine Containers (Group) Co., Ltd (CIMC; Chinese: 中集集团) is a Chinese company principally engaged in the manufacture and sale of transportation equipment, such as containers, road transport vehicles and airport ground-handling equipment.

China International Marine Containers was a constituent of SZSE 100 Index, but was removed in January 2017. As of 4 July 2017, it is one of the 200 components of SZSE 200 Index (the mid cap index of 101st to 300th companies).

== Corporate history ==
CIMC was incorporated in Shenzhen as a joint venture on 14 January 1980 as China International Marine Containers Co., Ltd. (Chinese: 中國國際海運集裝箱股份有限公司). After being restructured as a joint stock limited company in December 1992, and publicly offered A shares and B shares which were listed on the Shenzhen Stock Exchange in 1994, CIMC adopted its current name in 1995. Vanguard National Trailer Corp., CIMC's US subsidiary, acquired Monon in 2003.

In 2026, CIMC was among the 4 shipping firms charged by US for conspiring to restrict output and fix prices between 2019 and 2024, especially during the coronavirus pandemic. It was alleged that the supply chain was deliberately put under pressure by the container cartel to raise profits.

== Business Operations ==
Its container department produces dry freight containers, refrigerated containers, special containers and other containers. CIMC also offers road transport vehicles, including logistics vehicles, tanker trailers and construction vehicles. In addition, the Company designs and manufactures passenger boarding bridges and cargo handling systems for airports. Based in Shenzhen, Guangdong Province, CIMC is also engaged in the real estate industry through its subsidiaries.

With over 40% market share in the international container business and 56% market share in the dry marine container market, CIMC has been the biggest container-manufacturing company in the world since 1996. It has 12 production bases lay out in South, East and North of China, with products ranging from dry van, reefer, tank and other special containers. The customers include leading shipping companies and container leasing companies.

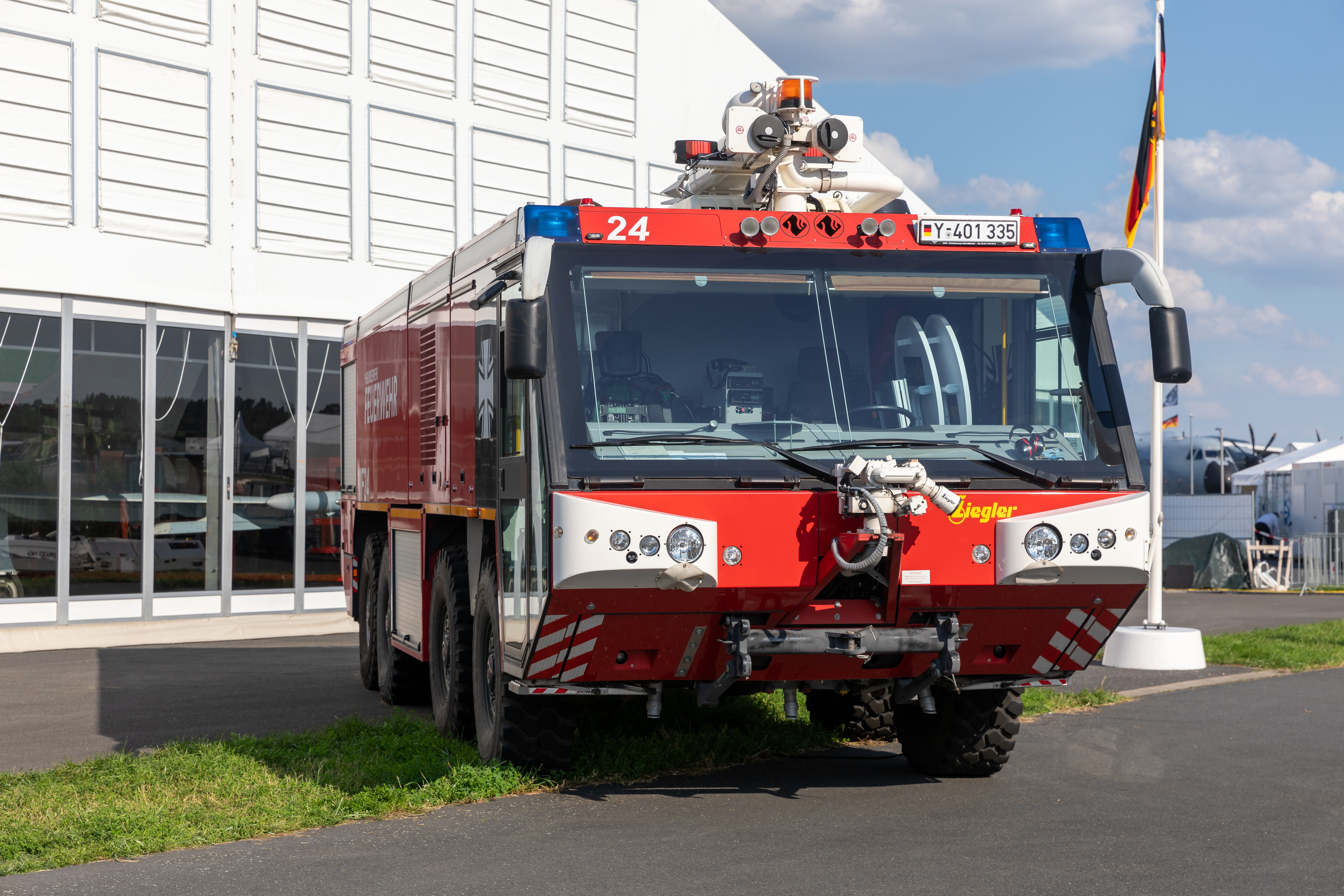
Ziegler Z8 fire engine

In 2013, CIMC acquired German manufacturer of fire engines Ziegler, including its subsidiary Visser B.V., which builds ambulances and interiors of defense vehicles.

It owns Yantai CIMC Raffles Shipyard in Yantai, China.

== Listing and Shareholders ==
On 8 April 1994, the A shares of CIMC were listed on the Shenzhen Stock Exchange.

On 19 December 2012, CIMC converted its B shares into H shares, and listed its H shares by way of introduction on the Main Board of the Stock Exchange of Hong Kong, being the first enterprise in China to do so.

According to the 2013 Annual Report of CIMC, China Merchants Group holds 25.54% while COSCO holds 22.75% of the total shares of the company.

== Other container manufacturers ==
- CXIC
- DFIC
- SINGAMAS
