= Huaigang Special Steel =

Chinese steel manufacturer

- Huaigang logo, bilingual name on the right
- Formerly: Huaigang Group Co., Ltd.
- Type: Subsidiary
- Industry: Manufacturing
- Founded: 1970 (as steel plant); 1986 (as company); 11 December 1996 (as limited company)
- Founder: Huai'an Municipal Government
- Headquarters: 188 Xi'an South Road, Huai'an, China
- Products: Steel and coke
- Revenue: ▼CN¥10.781 billion (2013)
- Operating income: ▲CN¥35 million (2013)
- Net income: ▲CN¥27 million (2013)
- Total assets: ▲CN¥8.131 billion (2013)
- Total equity: ▼CN¥3.015 billion (2013)
- Owner: Shagang Company (63.79%); Jiangyin Wande (15.45%); others (20.76%)
- Footnotes in a consolidated basis; equity and profit excluded minority interests; in Chinese Accounting Standards

Jiangsu Shagang Group Huaigang Special Steel Co., Ltd.
- Simplified Chinese: 江苏沙钢集团淮钢特钢股份有限公司
- Traditional Chinese: 江蘇沙鋼集團淮鋼特鋼股份有限公司
Transcriptions

Huaigang Special Steel
- Simplified Chinese: 淮钢特钢
- Traditional Chinese: 淮鋼特鋼
Transcriptions

Huaigang
- Simplified Chinese: 淮钢
- Traditional Chinese: 淮鋼
Transcriptions

Jiangsu Shagang Group Huaigang Special Steel Co., Ltd. (known as Huaigang or Huaisteel) is a Chinese steel manufacturer based in Huai'an, Jiangsu Province. It was a subsidiary of privately held company Shagang Group via its publicly traded subsidiary Shagang Company (SZSE: 002075) for 63.79% stake, from 2010 to 2015. As of 31 December 2013, Huaigang accounted for 99.9% revenue and 97% assets of Shagang Company. However, as of 31 December 2015, Shagang Group owned just 19.88% stake in Shagang Company; in turn Shagang Company owned 63.79% stake of Huaigang. Shagang Group sold 55.12% stake of Shagang Company in 2015, for about CN¥4.6 billion (or CN¥5.29 per share).

As of 4 July 2017, Shagang Company is a constituent of SZSE 200 Index (mid cap index).

== History ==
Huaigang Group Co., Ltd. (Chinese: 江苏淮钢集团有限公司) was incorporated on 11 December 1996 as a subsidiary of the Economic Commission of Huai'an (the city was known as Huaiyin at that time) for 91.97% stake. In 2000, Nanjing Iron and Steel Group acquired the controlling stake (93.49%). It was recapitalized in 2003, making the stake held by Nanjing Iron and Steel Group was diluted to 26.15%. Moreover, private investors were introduced. In 2005, the 26.15% stake was returned to Huai'an Municipal People's Government from Nanjing Iron and Steel Group. In June 2006, privately held company Shagang Group acquired 64.40% stake of Huaigang from other private investors. The stake was injected to a publicly traded company Gaoxin Zhangtong as a reverse IPO in 2010 (now known as Shagang Company). In December 2006 Huai'an Municipal Government also sold their stake to Jiangyin Wande (Chinese: 江阴万德). The shareholder of Jiangyin Wande, Li Xinren (Chinese: 李新仁), also owned the shares of Shagang Group.

In 2011 the company was re-incorporated as a company limited by shares, issuing 1.431 billion shares with par value CN¥1 each.

== Joint Venture ==
Huaigang formed a joint venture (Chinese: 江苏天淮钢管) with Tianjin Pipe Corporation. Huaigang owned 40% stake. In 2015 Huaigang sold the stake to Zhangjiagang Xiangbo (Chinese: 张家港翔博贸易) for CN¥250 million.

== Financial data ==
in a consolidated financial statements (in CN¥)
Shagang Company						Huaigang Special Steel					
Year	Revenue	Profit	Assets	Equity	shares %	Revenue	Profit	Profit to parent	Assets	Equity	Equity to parent
2007						8.994 billion	563 million		13.990 billion	1.774 billion	
2008						▲15.347 billion	▼104 million		▲16.398 billion	▲2.489 billion	
2009						▼12.619 billion	▲110 million		▼15.060 billion	▲2.596 billion	
2010	▼12.537 billion	▲358 million	▼11.555 billion	▲1.994 billion	63.79%	▼12.537 billion	▲561 million	▲358 million	▼10.724 billion	▲3.210 billion	▲2.048 billion
2011	▲15.001 billion	▼278 million	▼10.144 billion	▲2.290 billion	63.79%	▲14.934 billion	▼459 million	▼293 million	▼10.100 billion	▲3.270 billion	▲2.086 billion
2012	▼12.148 billion	▼23 million	▼8.153 billion	▲2.319 billion	63.79%	▼12.143 billion	▼22 million	▼14 million	▼8.058 billion	▼3.194 billion	▼2.037 billion
2013	▼10.787 billion	▲28 million	▲8.382 billion	▲2.351 billion	63.79%	▼10.781 billion	▲27 million	▲17 million	▲8.131 billion	▼3.015 billion	▼1.923 billion
2014	▼10.308 billion	▲35 million	▼7.137 billion	▲2.389 billion	63.79%						
2015	▼7.357 billion	▼ (81 million)	▼6.550 billion	▼2.307 billion	63.79%						
