= CIE Manufacturing =

American intermodal chassis manufacturer

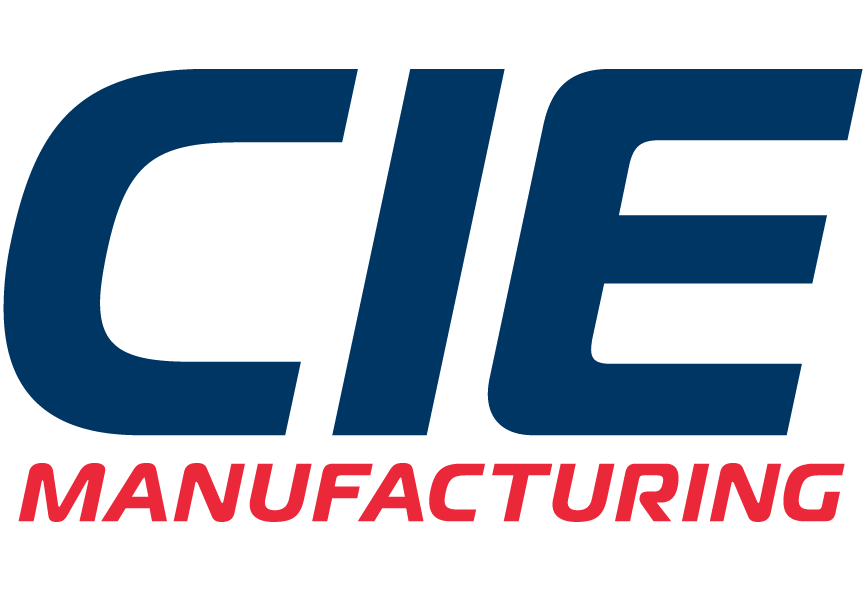
- Type: Privately held company
- Industry: Manufacturing
- Predecessor: China International Marine Containers (US)
- Founded: May 2020; 6 years ago
- Headquarters: South Gate, California, United States
- Area served: United States
- Products: Intermodal container chassis
- Website: ciemanufacturing.com

CIE Manufacturing is an American manufacturer of intermodal container chassis used for transporting shipping containers in the North American logistics sector.

== History & operations ==
CIE Manufacturing developed from the U.S. chassis production activities previously associated with CIMC. The company manufactures container chassis at facilities located in the United States.

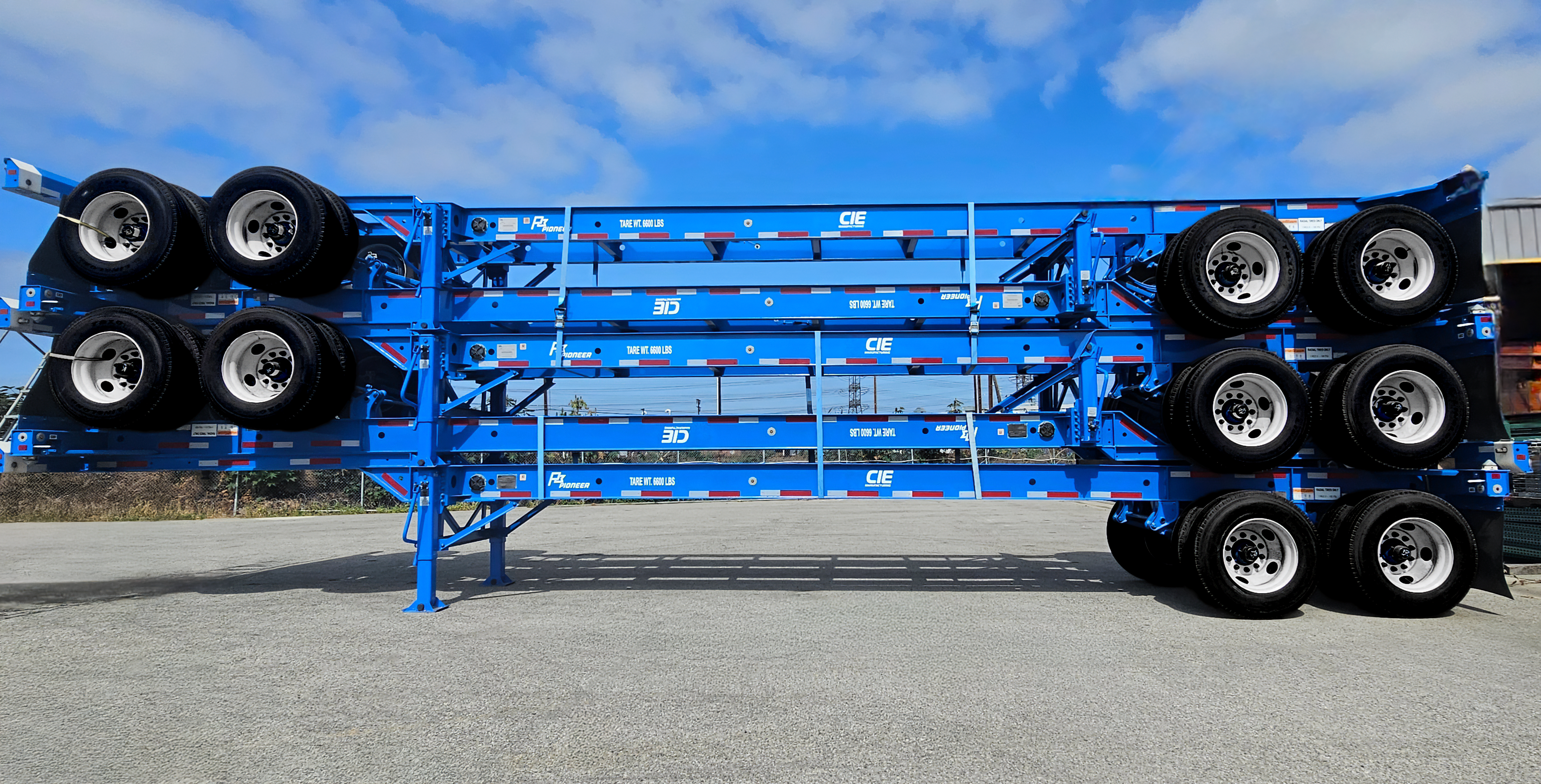
Multiple container chassis stacked for storage and transport

Between the late 2010s and mid-2020s, CIE Manufacturing was referenced in documentation from the United States International Trade Commission and the Department of Commerce concerning the intermodal chassis sector, including materials that reviewed chassis imports and related industry conditions. CIE Manufacturing's equipment is used in port, rail, and highway transport settings for containerized freight operations.
