= Wanma =

Wanma (Chinese: 万马) means ten thousand in Chinese language, may refer to:

- Wanma Group, owned by billionaire Zhang Desheng
  - Zhejiang Wanma, a Chinese listed company co-owned by Wanma Group
- Wanma Technology, a Chinese listed company co-owned by Zhang Desheng
- Zhejiang Wanma Cyclones (now known as Zhejiang Golden Bulls), a Chinese basketball team
