= Naura Technology =

Chinese semiconductor equipment manufacturer

NAURA Technology Group Co., Ltd.
- Native name: 北方华创科技集团股份有限公司
- Formerly: Beijing Sevenstar Electronics
- Type: Public
- Traded as: SZSE: 002371; CSI A50
- Industry: Semiconductors
- Founded: September 2001; 25 years ago
- Headquarters: Beijing, China
- Key people: Zhao Jinrong (Chairman); Tao Haihong (CEO)
- Revenue: ▲CN¥22.08 billion (2023)
- Net income: ▲CN¥4.03 billion (2023)
- Total assets: ▲CN¥53.63 billion (2023)
- Total equity: ▲CN¥24.83 billion (2023)
- Number of employees: 12,010 (2023)
- Website: www.naura.com

NAURA Technology Group Co., Ltd (Naura; Chinese: 北方华创科技集团; pinyin: Běifāng Huáchuàng Kējì Jítuán) is a publicly listed Chinese company that manufactures semiconductor chip production equipment. It is currently the largest semiconductor equipment manufacturer in China.

According to CINNO Research, in 2024, Naura was the sixth largest semiconductor equipment manufacturer globally in terms of total sales.

== History ==
In September 2001, Beijing Electronics Holdings, a government SASAC entity initiated the establishment of Beijing Sevenstar Electronics (Sevenstar Electronics).

On 16 March 2010, the company held its initial public offering on the ChiNext of Shenzhen Stock Exchange. It was the biggest gainer for mainland China stocks on that day where its initial price of 33 yuan per share jumped 79% percent to 59 yuan.

In 2016, Sevenstar Electronics acquired Beijing North Microelectronics (NMC) from its parent, Beijing Electronics Holdings. NMC specialized in Silicon etching and Physical vapor deposition (PVD) equipment. On 24 February 2017, after the company restructured following its acquisition, it was renamed to NAURA Technology Group.

In January 2018, the Committee on Foreign Investment in the United States (CFIUS) approved Naura's purchase of Akrion Systems, a Pennsylvania-based rival that was a supplier of advanced wafer surface preparation technology. This was the first takeover of an American company by a Chinese one that was approved since Donald Trump became President of the United States. Prior to that the Trump administration had blocked all Chinese acquisitions of US target companies as a result of the China–United States trade war.

In October 2022, Naura told its American employees in China to stop taking part in R&D activities to comply with the United States New Export Controls on Advanced Computing and Semiconductors to China. Naura stated its subsidiary, Beijing Naura Magnetoelectric Technology was on the Bureau of Industry and Security unverified list although it accounted for only 0.5% of the company's annual revenue. Its share price dropped 20% that week. A week later, US trade officials from American embassy in Beijing held talks with executives of Naura.

In December 2022, Beijing Naura Magnetoelectric Technology was removed from the Bureau of Industry and Security unverified list after their bona fides were able to be verified.

In February 2023, Yangtze Memory Technologies reduced its equipment purchase orders by 70% from Naura. The cancellation orders stated in October 2022 which was around the same time the US export controls came into effect.

In January 2024, Naura stated it expected its 2023 revenue to increase by around half from a year earlier as its technology developments allowed it fulfil local demands and gain a greater market share in the country.

In February 2024, Bloomberg News reported that Naura was one of the top investment picks among Wall Street firms such as Barclays and Sanford C. Bernstein. A company comparable to Applied Materials, it would be able to fulfill local market demands in China and fill the void left by foreign firms being unable to continue doing business due to geopolitical restrictions.

In April 2024, it was reported that Naura was starting research on lithography systems.

In September 2024, Taiwanese authorities accused eight mainland Chinese technology companies which included Naura of illegally poaching talent from Taiwan. Naura denied poaching local workers and stated its office in Taiwan operated in accordance with local laws and regulations.

In December 2024, Naura was targeted in a new round of US export controls and added to the United States Department of Commerce's Entity List.

On 10 March 2025, Naura announced it would acquire a 9.49% stake in Kingsemi for CNY1.69 billion making it the largest shareholder in the company.

== Business lines ==
Naura has four business lines:

- Semiconductors (plasma etching, PVD, CVD, oxidation/diffusion, cleaning system, and annealing)
- Vacuum technology (heat treatment, crystal growth and magnetic material)
- Lithium battery equipment
- Precision components (resistors, capacitors, crystal devices, and module power supplies)

== See also ==
- Semiconductor industry in China
- Applied Materials
