= Zhejiang Wanma =

Chinese manufacturing company

- Formerly: Zhejiang Wanma Cable
- Type: Public
- Traded as: SZSE: 002276; SZSE 200 Component
- Founder: Zhang Desheng
- Headquarters: Lin'an District, Hangzhou, China
- Owner: Wanma Group (35.4123%)
- Website: http://www.wanma-cable.cn

Zhejiang Wanma Co., Ltd.
- Simplified Chinese: 浙江万马股份有限公司
- Traditional Chinese: 浙江萬馬股份有限公司
Transcriptions

Alternative Chinese name
- Simplified Chinese: 万马股份
- Traditional Chinese: 萬馬股份
- Literal meaning: Myria-Horse Share
Transcriptions

Zhejiang Wanma Co., Ltd. is a Chinese manufacturer of electricity transmission line. Wanma became a listed company since 2009. Zhejiang Wanma was a constituent of SZSE 100 Index, but was removed in January 2017. As of 4 July 2017, it was a constituent of SZSE 200 Index (mid cap index). The firm manufactured electricity transmission line and distribution network. In 2017, it formed a joint venture in rental business of electricity-powered logistics vehicles. Zhang Desheng—via his non wholly owned investment vehicle Zhejiang Wanma Group—owned 35.4123% shares. He also owned 1.1276% directly; his daughter, 0.9166%. Wanma Technology (SZSE: 300698) started its own initial public offering in 2017. Immediately after the IPO, Zhang Desheng, owned 30.750% shares directly, as the largest shareholder of that company. Wanma Group was a sponsor of a Zhejiang basketball team.
