= Xiangxue =

Xiangxue (Chinese: 香雪; pinyin: Xiāng xuě; Jyutping: hoeng1 syut3) may refer to:

- Luogang Xiangxue, a place (tourist spot) in Luogang, Guangzhou City
  - Xiangxue Station, a station of Guangzhou Metro
  - Xiangxue Pharmaceutical a company that named after the place
    - Guangzhou Evergrande Taobao F.C., a Chinese football club that was sponsored by Xiangxue Pharmaceutical as "Guangzhou Xiangxue"
    - Xiangxue Pharmaceutical (football), a sponsored name for several Chinese youth team that played in Hong Kong
    - Shenzhen F.C., a Chinese football club that was sponsored by Xiangxue Pharmaceutical and known as Shenzhen Xiangxue Eisiti (Shenzhen Xiangxue Shangqingyin)
      - Xiangxue Eisiti (Hong Kong), B team of Shenzhen F.C. that played in Hong Kong
    - Sun Hei SC, a Hong Kong football club that was sponsored by Xiangxue Pharmaceutical as Xiangxue Sun Hei
