= Eoptolink =

Chinese electronics company

Eoptolink Technology Inc., Ltd
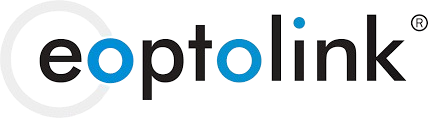
- Native name: 成都新易盛通信技术股份有限公司
- Company type: Public
- Traded as: SZSE: 300502
- Industry: Electronics
- Founded: 15 April 2008; 18 years ago
- Founder: Gao Guangrong
- Headquarters: Chengdu, Sichuan, China
- Key people: Gao Guangrong (Chairman); Huang Xiaolei (President)
- Revenue: ▼CN¥3.10 billion (2023)
- Net income: ▼CN¥688.36 million (2023)
- Total assets: ▲CN¥6.44 billion (2023)
- Total equity: ▲CN¥5.47 billion (2023)
- Number of employees: 1,933 (2023)
- Website: www.eoptolink.com

Eoptolink (Chinese: 新易盛; pinyin: Xīnyìshèng) is a publicly listed Chinese company headquartered in Chengdu that engages in the manufacture and sale of optical modules.

In 2022, it was ranked as the seventh largest transceiver supplier in the world.

== Background ==
In 2008, Eoptolink was founded by Gao Guangrong, an optoelectronics manufacturing veteran.

The company was based in the Shuangliu Southwest Airport Economic Development Zone of Chengdu. According to Gao, the location was near the Chengdu Shuangliu International Airport which allowed Eoptolink products to reach its overseas clients quickly.

On 3 March 2016, Eoptolink held its initial public offering becoming a listed company on the Shenzhen Stock Exchange.

In 2022, Eoptolink acquired US firm, Alpine Optoelectronics for its silicon photonics technology.

In June 2024, it was reported that Eoptolink shares had significantly risen in part due to the AI boom caused by Nvidia.

On 22 December 2024, Eoptolink announced Gao was under investigation by the China Securities Regulatory Commission for suspected violation of stock transfer regulations.

In September 2025, it was reported that Eoptolink recorded triple-digit gains in 2025 to become the top performers on China’s onshore equity benchmark. Its growth was driven by a flood of orders from data centers, which need optical transceivers to link thousands of GPUs, in AI clusters.

In October 2025, the United States Department of Defense stated that Eoptolink merits inclusion on a list of companies linked to China's military.

In April 2026, it was reported that Eoptolink was seeking a secondary listing on the Hong Kong Stock Exchange.

== See also ==
- Zhongji Innolight
- TFC Communciation
