= Suning Universal =

Chinese real estate company

Suning Universal Co., Ltd.
- Native name: 苏宁环球股份有限公司
- Company type: Public
- Traded as: SZSE: 000718; SZSE 200 Component
- Industry: Real estate
- Founder: Zhang Guiping
- Headquarters: Jilin Economic and Technological Development Zone, Jilin, China (legal); Nanjing, China (de facto)
- Key people: Zhang Guiping (founder and chairman)
- Revenue: ▲CN¥4,287,443 (US$662.448 million, 2020)
- Operating income: ▲CN¥1,988,641 (US$307.220 million, 2020)
- Net income: ▼CN¥1,038,158 (US$160.382 million, 2020)
- Total assets: ▼CN¥15,971,545 (US$2.467 billion, 2020)
- Total equity: ▲CN¥8,699,395 (US$1.344 billion, 2020)
- Owner: Suning Universal Group Co., Ltd. (21.750%); Zhang Guiping (17.270%); Zhang Kangli (14.930%); others
- Website: suning-universal.com
- Footnotes / references in consolidated basis

Suning Universal Co., Ltd. (Chinese: 苏宁环球股份有限公司) is a Chinese real estate company. The company was owned by Zhang Guiping (Chinese: 张桂平), via Suning Universal Group, Co. Ltd. for 21.750% stake (Chinese: 苏宁环球集团有限公司, Zhang himself had 90% stake in the Group Co.), as well as held 17.270% stake directly. Zhang Kangli (Chinese: 张康黎), son of Zhang Guiping, owned 14.930% stake in the listed company, as well as 10% in the Group Company, making the listed company was majority owned by Zhang family. Zhang Guiping is the elder brother of Zhang Jindong, co-founder of Suning Commerce Group.

As of 4 July 2017, it is one of the 200 components of SZSE 200 Index (the mid cap index of 101st to 300th companies).

In order to list in Shenzhen Stock Exchange, Suning Universal Group purchased a listed company and paper maker based in Jilin Province, and then inject the business from Suning Universal Group to the listed subsidiary.
