= SZSE 300 Index =

- Foundation: 4 November 2009; 16 years ago (Return Index); 4 November 2009; 16 years ago (Price Index); 31 December 2004 (base date)
- Operator: Shenzhen Securities Information; (a subsidiary of Shenzhen Stock Exchange)
- Exchanges: Shenzhen Stock Exchange
- Constituents: 300
- Type: large to medium cap A share
- Market cap: CN¥3.880 trillion (free-float adjusted, 30 December 2016)
- Weighting method: free float adjusted Capitalization
- Related indices: SZSE 100; SZSE 200; SZSE Component; SZSE 700; SZSE 1000; SZSE Composite

SZSE 300 Price Index (SZSE: 399007) and its sub-indexes SZSE 100 Price Index and SZSE 200 Price Index were the stock market indices of Shenzhen Stock Exchange, representing top 300 companies by free float adjusted market capitalization. The sub-indices represented top 100 companies and next 200 (the 101st to 300th) companies, respectively. SZSE 300 Index itself is a sub-index of SZSE Component Index, SZSE 1000 Index and SZSE Composite Index.

The index series also had a counterpart which calculated in different methodology, as SZSE 300 Return Index (SZSE: 399344), SZSE 100 Return Index and SZSE 200 Return Index.

== Change history ==
Date	In	Out
12 June 2017; (effective in July 2017)		
12 December 2016; (effective in January 2017)	30 companies	Beingmate; Shanghai Ganglian; Xiangxue Pharmaceutical; 27 other companies
