= TAFC =

TAFC may refer to:

- Tonbridge Angels F.C.
- Toronto Awaba FC
- Torpoint Athletic F.C.
- Tring Athletic F.C.

== See also ==
- TFC (disambiguation)
