= Chen Lihua =

Chinese billionaire businesswoman (1941–2026)

- 陳麗華
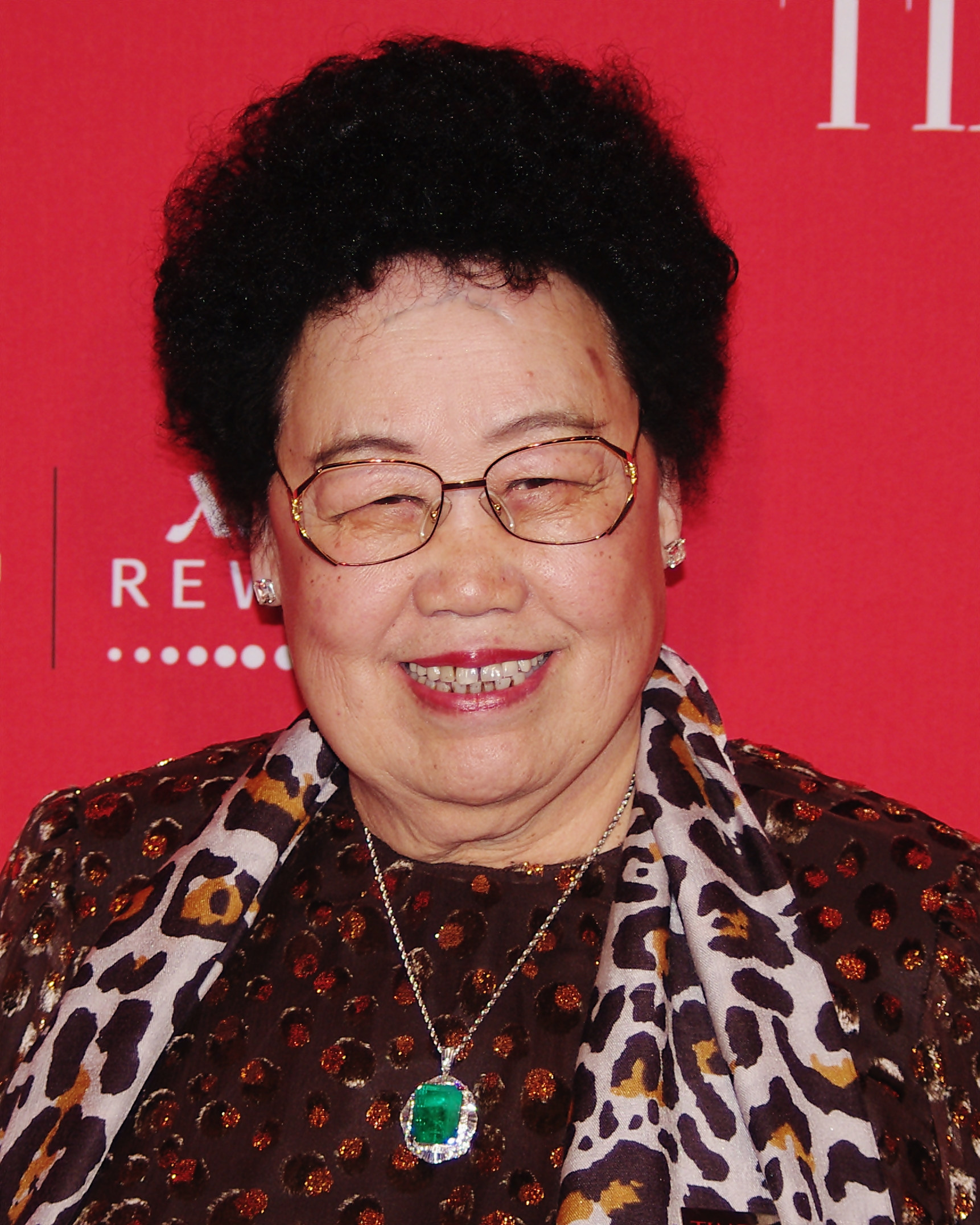
- Chen in 2012
- Born: 1941; Summer Palace, Peking, China
- Died: 5 April 2026 (aged 85); Beijing, China
- Other name: Chan Laiwa
- Citizenship: China
- Occupation: Chairwoman of Fuwah International Group
- Spouse: Chi Chongrui

Chen Lihua (simplified Chinese: 陈丽华; traditional Chinese: 陳麗華; 1941 – 5 April 2026), rendered Chan Laiwa in Cantonese, was a Chinese businesswoman who was the founder and chairman of Fuwah International Group, one of Beijing's largest commercial property developers. In 2014, Forbes ranked her as the 10th richest mainland Chinese, the richest woman in China, and one of only 19 female billionaires in the world who did not inherit their billionaire status. In 2015, touchscreen entrepreneur Zhou Qunfei surpassed Chen as China's richest woman.

Chen was the founder and curator of the China Red Sandalwood Museum.

== Early life ==
Chen Lihua was born in 1941 in the Summer Palace of Peking, China. She was a descendant of a noble Manchu family of the Qing dynasty. When the Manchu Qing dynasty collapsed, her family lost their estates and became poor.

== Rise from poverty ==
Poverty forced Chen to leave high school and she started her own furniture repair business. In the early 1980s, Chen moved to Hong Kong and continued her business of buying and re-selling furniture. Her business in Hong Kong was successful enough that she accumulated enough money to buy 12 villas.

In the late 1980s, she moved back to Beijing to expand her real estate business. She founded Fuwah International Group in the early 1990s. Though its predominant business is real estate, the company also has a diverse portfolio in the fields of agriculture, tourism, electronics, hospitality, and red sandalwood art production, etc.

In recent years, Chen handed over daily management of her ventures to her son, preferring to concentrate on her museum instead.

== Cultural contributions and philanthropy ==
Chen founded the China Red Sandalwood Museum in 1999, where she invested 20 Billion Yuan. The museum covers an area of 25,000 square meters. She attributed her love of red sandalwood from the childhood years she spent in Summer Palace, where furnishings are made of the timber. She also donated sandalwood works to museums around the world.

She was also known for her social responsibility and philanthropy. Fu Wah donated 130 million yuan for disaster relief in 2005 and 265 million yuan in 2004.

== Personal life and death ==
Chen was married to Chinese actor Chi Chongrui. She had one son and two daughters. Chen resided in her Chinese Red Sandalwood Museum. She died on 5 April 2026, at the age of 85.
