= Sanhua =

Manufacturing company

SANHUA
- Company type: Public
- Traded as: SZSE: 2050; SEHK: 2050
- Industry: HVAC
- Headquarters: Hangzhou China
- Area served: Worldwide
- Products: HVAC; refrigeration; automotive; home appliances
- Total equity: CNY ¥3,055,335 (2009); ▲CNY¥ 4,653,411(2010); ▲CNY¥ 5,476,929 (2011); ▲CNY¥ 5,971,065 (2012)
- Number of employees: 20,000 (2017)
- Website: sanhuaeurope.com

Sanhua Holding Group Co., Ltd. (三花控股集团有限公司) is a global manufacturer of controls and components for the HVAC & Refrigeration home appliance, automotive air conditioning and thermal management industries.

== Brief introduction ==
It is one of China's manufacturers and exporters of control parts and components for air conditioners, refrigeration, home appliance, automotive air conditioning and thermal management. It is one of the world's largest reversing valve manufacturers. Customers include Carrier, Johnson Controls, Miele, Emerson, Heatcraft, Lennox, Manitowoc, Panasonic, Daikin, Mitsubishi Electric, Samsung, LG, Gree, Haier, GM, Valeo, DENSO, DELPHI and other manufacturers.

== Company history ==
- Sanhua Holding Group was founded in 1984, in Zhejiang, as a refrigeration components manufacturer. Over the next 10 years the company added components for air conditioning valves, such as the Reversing Valve.
- After 2004 a Research and Development Department was added, which works with Zhejiang University.
- In 2005 the company went public on the Shenzhen Stock Exchange under the code (002050:Shenzhen).
- In 2007 Sanhua acquired Ranco Valve division (Invensys), from then on, its reversing valve market share is more than 60%.
- In 2008 Sanhua intelligent (the public company) won China Quality Award, which marked the best product quality in manufacture industry.
- In 2012 Sanhua acquired Aweco (Home Appliances), and R- Squared Puckett Inc., in the field of microchannel heat exchangers.
- In 2016 Sanhua was invited to attend B20(one session of G20 Summit) as it is renowned in its sector.
- In 2017 Sanhua built automotive tech center in N.America, and TXV line started in Mexico. At the same year, Sanhua Automotive won PACE Award for its Electronic Expansion Valve(EXV) which has satisfied many global carmakers' high expectations for balanced system performance and value.
