= Asia (soft drink brand) =

Chinese soft drink brand

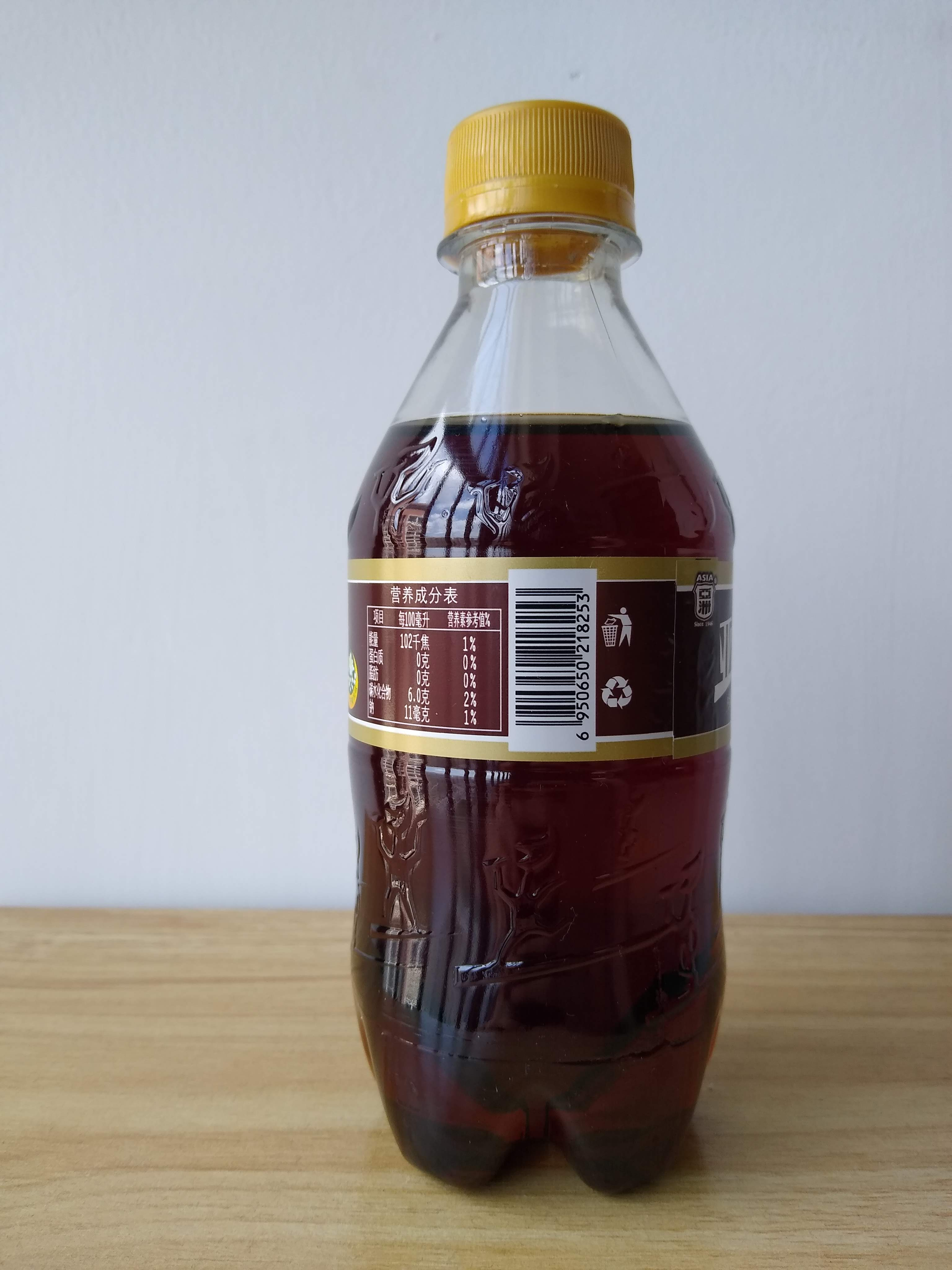
- A bottle of Asia Sarsae
- Product type: soft drink
- Current owner: GLIG; (an investment vehicle of the Guangzhou Government)
- Produced by: Xiangxue–Asian Beverage (Xiangxue Group)
- Country: China
- Introduced: 1946
- Markets: China

Asia
- Simplified Chinese: 亚洲
Transcriptions

Alternative Chinese name
- Simplified Chinese: 亚洲汽水
- Literal meaning: Asia soft drink
Transcriptions

Asia Sarsae
- Simplified Chinese: 亚洲沙士
- Literal meaning: Asia sarsaparilla
Transcriptions

Asia is a brand of sarsaparilla produced by Chinese private corporation Xiangxue Pharmaceutical via its subsidiary Xiangxue–Asian Beverage. However, the brand was still owned by Guangzhou Municipal People's Government (via GLIG).

Asia's sarsaparilla was considered as a collective memory of the citizens of Guangzhou, Guangdong.

== History ==
The "Asia" brand soft drinks began to be produced in Guangzhou in 1946. The brand and factory became nationalized after the establishment of the People's Republic of China in 1949. Along with its sister brand "Pearl", (Note: Named after the Pearl River, also known as Pearl River Bridge (Chinese: 珠江橋牌)) they also exported to the nearby British colony Hong Kong since 1960s, in various kind of favour, such as Apple.

It formed a joint venture (Pepsi-Asia Beverage Co. Ltd.) with PepsiCo in 1993. Pepsi abandoned the "Asia" brand and its products such as sarsaparilla. The joint venture became known as Guangzhou Asia Beverage Co., Ltd. in 2017 after being re-acquired by Guangzhou Municipal People's Government (via Guangzhou Light Industrial And Trade Group (GLIG), Chinese: 广州轻工工贸集团有限公司).

The rights to use the brand (Note: According to the trademark database (http://wsjs.saic.gov.cn), the brand was still owned by GLIG.) was also acquired by Xiangxue Pharmaceutical via another joint venture (Xiangxue owned 63.00% stake as of 2016; GLIG was a minority shareholder): Xiangxue Asian Beverage, which was incorporated in 2009. The new joint venture also rented the factory from the government which was owned by Guangzhou Asia Beverage.

== Sub-brand ==
- Chinese: 金典沙士; lit. 'Gold classic sarsaparilla'
