= Beingmate =

Chinese food manufacturer

Beingmate Baby & Child Food Co., Ltd.
- Type: Public
- Traded as: SZSE: 002570
- Founded: 1992
- Headquarters: Hangzhou, China

Chinese name
- Simplified Chinese: 贝因美婴童食品股份有限公司
- Traditional Chinese: 貝因美嬰童食品股份有限公司
Transcriptions
Standard Mandarin
- Hanyu Pinyin: Bèi yīn měi yīng tóng shí pǐn gǔ fèn yǒu xiàn gōng sī

Alternative Chinese name
- Simplified Chinese: 贝因美
- Traditional Chinese: 貝因美
Transcriptions
Standard Mandarin
- Hanyu Pinyin: Bèi yīn měi
- Website: www.beingmate.com

Beingmate Baby & Child Food Co., Ltd. or known as just Beingmate, is a Chinese food manufacturer. It is headquartered in Hangzhou, China. Founded in 1992, it was a leading milk powder brand in China, but declined in the recent years. In March 2015, Fonterra Cooperative Group purchased 18.8% of Beingmate.

Beingmate is listed on the Shenzhen Stock Exchange. It was a constituent of the exchange's mid cap index SZSE 200 Index, but was removed in January 2017. It was inserted to small cap index SZSE 700 Index instead.

== Product sites ==
Beingmate owned 51% stake in a powder plant in Darnum, Victoria, Australia, with the rest was owned by Fonterra.
