= Tianjin Pipe Corporation =

Chinese state-owned pipe producting company

- Formerly: 天津钢管集团有限责任公司
- Type: State-owned enterprise
- Industry: Manufacturing
- Predecessor: 天津无缝钢管总厂
- Founded: 11 December 1987; 1993 (incorporated as limited company)
- Headquarters: Tianjin, China
- Products: Stemless steel pipes
- Revenue: ▼CN¥20.199 billion (2016)
- Operating income: ▼ (CN¥1.803 billion) (2016)
- Net income: ▼ (CN¥1.835 million) (2016)
- Total assets: CN¥56.547 billion (2016)
- Total equity: ▼CN¥5.982 billion (2016)
- Owner: See list
- Parent: Tianjin Government
- Subsidiaries: See list

Chinese name
- Simplified Chinese: 天津钢管集团股份有限公司
- Traditional Chinese: 天津鋼管集團股份有限公司
- Literal meaning: Tianjin Steel Pipe Group, Company Limited by Shares
Transcriptions
Standard Mandarin
- Hanyu Pinyin: Tiānjīn gāngguǎn jítuán gǔfèn yǒuxiàn gōngsī

Chinese short name
- Simplified Chinese: 天津钢管
- Traditional Chinese: 天津鋼管
Transcriptions
Standard Mandarin
- Hanyu Pinyin: Tiānjīn gāngguǎn

Second alternative Chinese name
- Simplified Chinese: 天管
- Traditional Chinese: 天管
Transcriptions
Standard Mandarin
- Hanyu Pinyin: Tiānguǎn

Third alternative Chinese name
- Simplified Chinese: 天津大无缝
Transcriptions
- Website: tpco.com.cn

Tianjin Pipe (Group) Corporation Limited known as Tianjin Pipe (Chinese: 天津钢管) or its abbreviation TPCO, is the largest stemless steel pipe maker of China as well as one of the largest in the world.

== History ==
The predecessor of Tianjin Pipe was founded on 11 December 1987 (as Chinese: 天津无缝钢管总厂; lit. 'Tianjin Stemless Steel Pipe "Head" Factory'); it was one of the project in the Eighth Five-Year Plan of China. The factory was later incorporated as a limited company, under a law that was established in 1993. In 1999 the corporation (Chinese: 天津钢管集团有限责任公司; lit. 'Tianjin Steel Pipe Group Limited Liability Corporation') fall under control by the Ministry of Finance of the People's Republic of China due to debt-to-equity swap, which the four state-owned asset management companies or bad banks, Huarong, Cinda, Great Wall and Orient Asset Management owned 100% stake. In 2003, 90% stake of TPCO was transferred to Tianjin Pipe Investment Holding (Chinese: 天津钢管投资控股有限公司), a company that was supervised by the Economic Commission (Chinese: 天津市经济委员会) of the Tianjin Government. In 2004, 57% stake of TPCO was transferred from Tianjin Pipe Investment Holding to TEDA Holding (Chinese: 天津泰达投资控股有限公司), a company that was supervised by the State-owned Assets Supervision and Administration Commission (SASAC) of Tianjin Government. In 2006 TPCO became a "company limited by shares" (Chinese: 天津钢管集团股份有限公司). In 2007 Bohai Industrial Investment Fund (Chinese: 渤海产业投资基金) acquired a minority stake of TPCO from Tianjin Pipe Investment Holding. In 2010 Tianjin Pipe Investment Holding became a subsidiary of Bohai Steel Group (Chinese: 渤海钢铁集团有限公司), another Tianjin SASAC supervising entity. In April 2016, due to the dissolution of Bohai Steel Group, the shares of Tianjin Pipe Investment Holding was transferred to Bohai State-owned Assets Administration Co., Ltd (Chinese: 天津渤海国有资产经营管理有限公司), a wholly owned subsidiary of Tianjin Jinlian Investment Holding (Chinese: 天津津联投资控股有限公司), another state-owned enterprise that was supervised by Tianjin SASAC.

TPCO had one of the largest Chinese industrial investment in the United States. TPCO America had a share capital of US$298,610,935.84, build a new plant located in Gregory, Texas. However, it was reported that TPCO signed a tax incentive deal with Gregory-Portland Independent School District (GPISD), which supposed requiring the subsidiary to employ local population. However, the company refused to do so, paying fines and request to cancel the deal instead.

== Joint Venture ==
Tianjin Pipe Corporation formed a joint venture (Chinese: 江苏天淮钢管有限公司) with Huaigang Special Steel. TPCO owned 60% stake. Huaigang sold the stake to a third part in 2015. Tianjin Pipe Corporation also formed two joint ventures Tianjin TISCO & TPCO Stainless Steel (Chinese: 天津太钢天管不锈钢) and Tianjin TPCO & TISCO Welding Pipe (Chinese: 天津天管太钢焊管) with Taigang Stainless Steel in a 35–65 ratio (via a subsidiary (Chinese: 天津大无缝投资)) and 50-50 ratio respectively.

== Subsidiaries ==
- TPCO America (100%)
- TPCO Enterprise (90%)
- TPCO Gulf PZE (100%)
- TPCO Panasia (51%)
- PT TPCO Panasia PTE Ltd. (100%)
- Tianjin Pipe Corporation (Middle East) Ltd. (51%)
- Chinese: 天津钢管制铁有限公司 (100%)
- Chinese: 天津钢管制造有限公司 (100%)
- Chinese: 天津钢管钢铁贸易有限公司 (100%)
- Chinese: 天津钢管国际经济贸易有限公司 (100%)
- Chinese: 天津钢管三圆管材有限公司 (100%)
- Chinese: 天津天管特殊钢有限公司 (100%)
- Chinese: 天津天管元通管材制品有限公司 (100%)
- Chinese: 天津天管远洋国际货代有限公司 (70%)
- Chinese: 天津大无缝钢铁开发有限公司 (100%)
- Chinese: 天津大无缝铜材有限公司 (100%)
- Chinese: 天津大无缝投资有限公司 (99.05%)
- Chinese: 天津大无缝物流发展有限公司 (100%)
- Chinese: 天津赛瑞机器设备有限公司 (50%)
- Chinese: 天津杰迪罗斯石油装备有限公司 (60%)
- Chinese: 河北大无缝铜业有限公司 (85%)
- Chinese: 河北大无缝建昌铜业有限公司 (50%)
- Chinese: 香港元通贸易公司 (100%)

== Shareholders ==
As of 21 April 2016

- State-owned Assets Supervision and Administration Commission of Tianjin Government (84.27%)
  - via wholly owned subsidiary TEDA Holding (57.00%)
  - via wholly owned subsidiary Tianjin Pipe Investment Holding of Tianjin Bohai State-owned Assets Administration (27.27%)
- a consortium of the Ministry of Finance of the People's Republic of China (10%)
  - China Cinda Asset Management (6.11%)
  - China Orient Asset Management (3.03%)
  - China Great Wall Asset Management (0.43%)
  - China Huarong Asset Management (0.43%)
- Bohai Industrial Investment Fund (5.73%)

== See also ==
- Tianjin Pipe Corporation Station, metro station
