= Taiyuan Iron and Steel Group =

Chinese steel company

- Trade name: Taigang Group
- Formerly: Taiyuan Iron & Steel Corporation
- Type: State-owned enterprise
- Industry: Conglomerate
- Founded: 1934; 1996 (as limited company)
- Headquarters: Taiyuan, China
- Area served: China, exported worldwide
- Products: Steel; Iron ore; Coke; Real estate
- Services: Medical service
- Revenue: ▼CN¥90.835 billion (2015)
- Operating income: ▼ (CN¥5.139 billion) (2015)
- Net income: ▼ (CN¥3.357 billion) (2015)
- Total assets: ▼CN¥125.827 billion (2015)
- Total equity: ▼CN¥28.875 billion (2015)
- Owner: Shanxi Government (100%)
- Parent: Shanxi SASAC
- Subsidiaries: Taigang Stainless Steel (63.49%); Linfen Iron & Steel (59.85%)

Chinese name
- Simplified Chinese: 太原钢铁（集团）有限公司
- Traditional Chinese: 太原鋼鐵（集團）有限公司
Transcriptions
Standard Mandarin
- Hanyu Pinyin: Tàiyuán gāngtiě jítuán yǒuxiàn gōngsī

Taigang Group
- Simplified Chinese: 太钢集团
- Traditional Chinese: 太鋼集團
- Literal meaning: Taisteel Group
Transcriptions
Standard Mandarin
- Hanyu Pinyin: Tàiyuán jítuán
- Website: www.tisco.com.cn
- Footnotes in a consolidated basis; equity and profit excluded minority interests; in Chinese Accounting Standards

Taiyuan Iron and Steel (Group) Co., Ltd. formerly Taiyuan Iron & Steel Corporation (TISCO), also known as Taigang Group, is a Chinese steel maker based in Taiyuan, Shanxi Province.

The company was the parent of Taigang Stainless Steel Co., Ltd., a listed steel manufacturer and Linfen Iron and Steel, an unlisted steel manufacturer respectively. The unlisted portion of the group, also consisted of a real estate company and a hospital.

== History ==
The predecessor of Taiyuan steel plant was founded in 1934, in the Warlord Era by Yan Xishan. In 1949 it was under control of the Chinese Communist Party during the Chinese Civil War.

In 1996 it was incorporated as "Taiyuan Iron and Steel (Group) Co., Ltd.". In 1998, a subsidiary was incorporated and listed on Shenzhen Stock Exchange ("Shanxi Taigang Stainless Steel Co., Ltd."; SZSE: 000825).

In 2006, Taigang Group injected most steel manufacturing assets to the publicly traded subsidiary, except Linfen Iron and Steel, in Linfen, Shanxi and several subsidiaries.

== Business divisions ==
Taiyuan Iron and Steel Group owned a hospital in Taiyuan, via a non wholly owned subsidiary. The group also involved in real estate development which developed a number of neighbourhoods in Taiyuan. Some of them were allocated to the staff of the group.

The group's flagship subsidiary, Taigang Stainless Steel had two joint ventures with Tianjin Pipe Corporation (TPCO): "Tianjin TISCO & TPCO Stainless Steel" in a 65–35 ratio (TPCO held the stake via a non wholly owned subsidiary), as well as "Tianjin TPCO & TISCO Welding Pipe" in a 50–50 ratio respectively.

Stainless steel CN¥0.1 coins were made by Taigang Stainless Steel.

== Equity investments ==
Taiyuan Iron and Steel Group was the second largest shareholder of listed securities firm, Shanxi Securities, for 9.99% stake (2018 data). From 2014 to 2016 the group had disinvest part of the stake they owned.

Taiyuan Iron and Steel Group also owned 16.67% stake in China Niobium Investment Holdings, which the holding owned 15% stake of Companhia Brasileira de Metalurgia e Mineração.

Taiyuan Iron and Steel Group also owned 40% stake in CNMC Nickel, which owned a nickel mine in Myanmar.

== Rankings ==
Taigang Stainless Steel was ranked the 1324th in 2019 Forbes Global 2000 list, a list for global top listed companies. As of 4 July 2017, it was a constituent of SZSE 200 Index (mid cap index).

According to World Steel Association (Chinese companies data was provided by China Iron and Steel Association), the corporation was ranked the 39th in 2018 the world ranking by production volume, for 10.70 million metric tons.
