= TFC =

TFC may refer to:

- Taiwan Fertilizer Company, a company based in Taipei, Taiwan
- Tastee Fried Chicken, a Nigerian fast-food chain
- Tohokushinsha Film Corporation, a film distributor and production company based in Akasaka, Minato, Tokyo
- Tanglewood Festival Chorus, the Boston Symphony's chorus since 1970
- Team Fortress Classic, a first-person shooter video game
- Tennessee Farmers Cooperative, an agricultural cooperative in Tennessee
- Terrace F. Club, an eating club at Princeton university
- TFC Communication, a Chinese optical fiber components company
- The Final Cartridge III, a cartridge to freeze and save on Commodore 64 computer
- The Final Cut (disambiguation)
- Telford Central railway station, Shropshire, England National Rail code
- Thin film composite membrane
- Turner Fenton Campus, a high school in Brampton, Ontario, Canada (now renamed to Turner Fenton Secondary School)
- The Fight Club, a Canadian promotion out of Edmonton, Alberta
- The Filipino Channel, an international Filipino broadcasting service owned by ABS-CBN
- Transport for Cornwall (TfC), an English public transport body
- Triangular fibrocartilage, an articular discus found in the wrist
- Truist Financial, a bank based in Charlotte, North Carolina
- Theory of Functional Connections, generalization of interpolation (Mathematics)
- Rhythmic, a Billboard chart with the shortcut "TFC"

== In association football ==
- Tamworth F.C.
- Thionville FC
- Torino F.C.
- Toronto FC
- Toulouse FC
- Trafford F.C.
- Tullycarnet F.C.
- Tullyvallen F.C.
