= Kingsemi =

Chinese semiconductor equipment manufacturer

Kingsemi Co., Ltd.
- Native name: 沈阳芯源微电子设备股份有限公司
- Formerly: Shenyang Xinyuan Advanced Semiconductor Technology
- Company type: Public; State-owned enterprise
- Traded as: SSE: 688037
- Industry: Semiconductors
- Founded: 17 December 2002; 23 years ago
- Founder: Zong Runfu
- Headquarters: Shenyang, Liaoning, China
- Key people: Zong Runfu (Chairman & CEO)
- Revenue: ▲CN¥1.72 billion (2023)
- Net income: ▲CN¥250.15 million (2023)
- Total assets: ▲CN¥4.03 billion (2023)
- Total equity: ▲CN¥2.38 billion (2023)
- Number of employees: 1,118 (2023)
- Website: www.kingsemi.com

Kingsemi Co., Ltd. (Kingsemi; Chinese: 芯源微; pinyin: Xīnyuán wēi) is a partially state-owned publicly listed Chinese company that manufactures semiconductor device fabrication equipment. They include photolithography process coating equipment and wafer cleaning tools.

== Background ==
Harbin Institute of Technology graduate, Zong Runfu worked at the Shenyang Institute of Automation where he eventually became director of the Science and Technology Department. During his time there he noticed the project cycle was long and the efficiency was low. Zong suggested to the institute that researchers should go to enterprises and turn the results from academia into standardized products.

In 2002, Shenyang Xinyuan Advanced Semiconductor Technology (later rebranded to Kingsemi) was established which was led by Zong. Initially the company experienced difficulty as they had to develop everything from scratch and there was pressure from both the institute and external stakeholders.

On 16 December 2019, Kingsemi held its initial public offering becoming a listed company on the Shanghai Stock Exchange STAR Market. The reason for listing was to obtain capital to fund R&D investments.

In 2024 at a product presentation event, Kingsemi stated it was only domestic company that could produce spin-coater developing equipment. It received CNY2.2 billion worth of orders in 2023 due to demand for advanced packaging and foundry process equipment. Kingsemi demonstrated its equipment which included a prototype chemical cleansing machine that covers the process requirements at 28nm and above as well as a wafer bonding machine.

In December 2024, Kingsemi was targeted in a new round of US export controls and added to the United States Department of Commerce's Entity List.

On 10 March 2025, Naura Technology announced it would acquire a 9.49% stake in Kingsemi for CNY1.69 billion making it the largest shareholder in the company.

== See also ==
- Shenyang Institute of Automation
- Semiconductor industry in China
