= Tinci Materials =

Chinese daily chemical materials manufacturer

Guangzhou Tinci Materials Technology Co., Ltd.
- Type: Public
- Traded as: SZSE: 002709
- Founded: June 2000
- Headquarters: Guangzhou
- Key people: Xu Jinfu (chairman)
- Revenue: ▲$3.1 billion (2023)
- Net income: $716 million (2023)
- Total assets: $3.8 billion (2023)
- Number of employees: 6,002 (2023)
- Website: www.tinci.com

Tinci Materials (simplified Chinese: 天赐材料; traditional Chinese: 天賜材料; officially Guangzhou Tinci Materials Technology Co., Ltd.), simply known as Tinci, is a Chinese cosmetics materials manufacturer founded by Xu Jinfu in 2000. The company primarily involves in the R&D and production of new fine chemical materials, especially specializing in the producing of electrolytes. Additionally, the company also makes battery materials and specialty chemicals.

== History ==
Tinci Materials stepped into the lithium battery electrolyte industry in 2002. In 2011, it became a supplier to Procter & Gamble. The company went public on the Shenzhen Stock Exchange on January 23, 2014, with the stock symbol "002709.SZ".

== Partnership ==
Tinci Materials forged a partnership with Lanxess in March 2021, and starting the following year, its electrolyte formulations will be produced at a plant in Leverkusen, Germany. In May, it signed a supply agreement with CATL.

In 2023, the company announced that it will discontinue its electrolyte project in the Czech Republic and relocate production facilities to Casablanca, Morocco. The total investment will be 1.99 billion yuan, with work to be completed in 2025. The company's annual production capacity is 150,000 tonnes of electrolytes, 100,000 tonnes of lithium hexafluorophosphate and 50,000 tonnes of lithium-iron phosphate materials.
