= Huadong Medicine =

Chinese pharmaceutical company

Huadong Medicine Pvt Ltd
- Traded as: SZSE: 000963
- Industry: Pharmaceuticals
- Founded: 1993
- Headquarters: Hangzhou, China
- Website: www.eastchinapharm.com

HD Medicine, or Huadong Medicine Co., Ltd., is a Hangzhou-based pharmaceutical company registered on the Shenzhen Stock Exchange since December 1999. It has a listed share capital of 380,000,000 RMB and a market capitalization of 5.1981 billion RMB as of June 2026. It is the largest pharmaceutical company in Zhejiang and the leading immunosuppressant manufacturer in China.

In June 2025, the company received approval to commence clinical trials for Roflumilast Foam, targeting dermatological conditions.
