= SZSE Component Index =

Chinese stock index

- Operator: Shenzhen Securities Information; (a subsidiary of Shenzhen Stock Exchange)
- Exchanges: Shenzhen Stock Exchange
- Constituents: 500 (since 2015); 40 (1994–2015)
- Type: large to small cap

SZSE Component Index
- Simplified Chinese: 深圳证券交易所成份股价指数
Transcriptions

Alternative Chinese name
- Simplified Chinese: 深证成指
Transcriptions
Standard Mandarin
- Hanyu Pinyin: Shēn zhèng chéng zhǐ

The SZSE Component Index is an index of 500 stocks that are traded at the Shenzhen Stock Exchange (SZSE). It is the main stock market index of SZSE.

== Constituents ==
The full list of all constituent stocks can be found at SZSE.

== Related indices ==
- SZSE 300 Index - top 300 companies
  - SZSE 100 Index - top 100 companies
  - SZSE 200 Index 101st to 300th companies
- SZSE 1000 Index - top 1000 companies
  - SZSE 700 Index 301st to 1000th companies
- SZSE Composite Index - index for all shares from all companies of the exchange

== See also ==
- CSI 300 Index major index of mainland Chinese stock markets
- SSE Composite Index major index of Shanghai Stock Exchange
- Hang Seng Index major index of Hong Kong Stock Exchange of Hong Kong S.A.R., China
- Taiwan Capitalization Weighted Stock Index major index of Taiwan Stock Exchange of Taiwan, Republic of China
