= Lens Technology =

Chinese precision manufacturing company

Lens Technology Co., Ltd.
- Native name: 蓝思科技股份有限公司
- Type: Public
- Traded as: SZSE: 300433; SEHK: 6613
- Industry: Precision manufacturing Consumer electronics components
- Founded: 1993
- Founder: Zhou Qunfei
- Headquarters: Changsha, Hunan, China
- Area served: Worldwide
- Key people: Zhou Qunfei (Chairwoman)
- Products: Cover glass, structural parts, functional modules
- Revenue: RMB 69.9 billion (US$9.8 billion, 2024)
- Number of employees: 100,000+

Lens Technology Co., Ltd. (Chinese: 蓝思科技股份有限公司) is a Chinese precision manufacturing company that produces glass, ceramic, metal, and sapphire components for consumer electronics and automotive interaction systems. Its customers include multinational electronics and automotive manufacturers.

Lens Technology is listed on the Shenzhen Stock Exchange and completed a secondary listing on the Hong Kong Stock Exchange in 2025.

== History ==
Lens Technology was founded in 1993 by Zhou Qunfei. The company initially manufactured watch glass before expanding into mobile phone cover glass as demand for touchscreen devices grew.

The company expanded during the 2000s and 2010s through vertical integration, automation, and in-house equipment development. It went public on the Shenzhen Stock Exchange in 2015 and completed a Hong Kong listing in 2025.

== Products and processes ==
Lens Technology's manufacturing areas include:

- Chemically strengthened glass and ion-exchange processing
- CNC machining of glass and structural components
- Optical and functional coatings, including anti-fingerprint and anti-reflection coatings
- Printing and surface decoration
- Ultra-thin glass (UTG) and components for foldable displays
- Structural and functional parts for smart vehicles and wearable devices

The company operates a vertically integrated model covering research, design collaboration, tooling, processing, and production.

== Research and development ==
Lens Technology conducts R&D independently and in collaboration with customers during product development. As of 2024, the company reported over 24,000 R&D and technical personnel, cumulative R&D expenditure of RMB 18 billion between 2015 and 2024, and annual R&D spending of RMB 2.78 billion in 2024.
