= Zhongji Innolight =

Chinese electronics company

Zhongji Innolight Co., Ltd.
- Trade name: Innolight
- Native name: 中际旭创股份有限公司
- Type: Public
- Traded as: SZSE: 300308; SEHK: 3308; CSI A100
- Industry: Electronics
- Founded: May 1987; 39 years ago
- Headquarters: Longkou, Shandong, China
- Key people: Wang Weixiu (Chairman); Liu Sheng (President)
- Revenue: ▲CN¥10.72 billion (2023)
- Net income: ▲CN¥2.21 billion (2023)
- Total assets: ▲CN¥20.01 billion (2023)
- Total equity: ▲CN¥14.78 billion (2023)
- Number of employees: 6,166 (2023)
- Website: www.zj-innolight.com

Zhongji Innolight (Chinese: 中际旭创股份有限公司; pinyin: Zhōngjì Xùchuàng Gǔfèn Yǒuxiàn Gōngsī) is a publicly listed Chinese company that engages in the manufacture and sale of telecommunication transceiver modules. It is the largest producer of optical transceivers in the world, making it a critical part of digital equipment and infrastructure, including AI data centers.

== Background ==
=== Shandong Zhongji Electrical Equipment (1987 to 2017) ===
In 1987, Shandong Zhongji Electrical Equipment was founded originally in Longkou as a machinery manufacturing factory.

In 1999, the company restructured from a collective enterprise to a private enterprise. It was one of the earliest companies in China to independently develop and manufacture CNC machines for motor winding.

In 2000, the company was recognized as a national high-tech enterprises by the Ministry of Science and Technology.

In April 2012, Shandong Zhongji Electrical Equipment held its initial public offering (IPO) becoming a listed company on the Shenzhen Stock Exchange.

=== InnoLight Technology (2008 to 2017) ===
In April 2008, InnoLight Technology (IT) was founded. It produced high-speed optical transceivers that facilitate communication between servers. The company experience significant growth due to popularity of cloud computing. Investors of the firm included Google Capital, Lightspeed Venture Partners and Oriza Holdings who chose to invest in it due to its importance to data centers.

=== Zhongji Innolight (2017 to present) ===
In 2017, Shandong Zhongji Electrical Equipment acquired IT. The company was restructured to form Zhongji InnoLight which kept the same stock ticker. The machinery business was spun out as a separate entity, Shandong Zhongji Intelligent Equipment (SZIE). Zhongji InnoLight would be the holding company for both IT and SZIE.

In February 2020, Zhongji InnoLight acquired Chengdu Tsuhan Science & Technology, a provider of optical components and transceivers.

In July 2023, Zhongji InnoLight acquired Chongqing Junge Electronic Technology, a producer of electronic products.

In September 2025, it was reported that Zhongji InnoLight recorded triple-digit gains in 2025 to become the top performers on China's onshore equity benchmark. Its growth was driven by a flood of orders from data centers, which need optical transceivers to link thousands of GPUs, in AI clusters.

In October 2025, the United States Department of Defense stated that Zhongji Innolight merits inclusion on a list of companies linked to China's military. In the same month it was reported that Zhongji Innolight was considering a secondary listing on the Hong Kong Stock Exchange. In June 2026, the US Department of Defense added the company to a list of Chinese military-linked companies.

== See also ==
- Eoptolink
