= ChiNext =

Subsidiary of the Shenzhen Stock Exchange

ChiNext is a NASDAQ-style subsidiary of the Shenzhen Stock Exchange. The first batch of firms started trading on ChiNext on October 30, 2009.

ChiNext aims to attract innovative and fast-growing enterprises, especially high-tech firms. Its listing standards are less stringent than those of the Main and SME Boards of the Shenzhen Stock Exchange.

== History ==
ChiNext is analogous to NASADAQ. ChiNext aims to attract innovative and fast-growing enterprises, especially high-tech firms. Its listing standards are less stringent than those of the Main and SME Boards of the Shenzhen Stock Exchange.

The initial proposal to establish a stock exchange for high-tech firms in China came in August 1999, which was a time when internet stocks were highly popular in the US. However, the plans were shelved for a long time, potentially due to the burst of the dot-com bubble in 2000 and the lost confidence in internet and technology stocks. ChiNext was finally inaugurated in Shenzhen on 23 October 2009.

The shares of the first batch of 28 firms made their debut on ChiNext on October 30, 2009, with a Total Market Cap value of nearly 11 billion RMB and a Total Negotiable Cap. Value of 7.8 billion RMB. Trading in each of these stocks had to be temporarily suspended on this day due to their prices reaching change limits. The second batch contained eight firms whose shares started trading on December 25, 2009. At the end of 2009 there were 36 firms listed on ChiNext. In 2010, a further 117 firms went public, increasing the total number of listed firms to 153. 128 and 74 firms went public in 2011 and 2012 respectively. As a result, there were 355 firms listed by the end of 2012.

The IPO market was closed in China throughout 2013. Therefore, no new listings took place on ChiNext during that year. In January 2014, there were 24 new listings following the decision of CSRC to reopen the IPO market. In May 2014, CSRC announced a change in rules that eased profitability requirements for firms seeking a listing on ChiNext.

As of June 2014, the total market cap. value of all companies was 95 billion RMB and the negotiable cap. value was almost 59 billion RMB.

== See also ==
- Alternative Investment Market
- Growth Enterprise Market
- Companies Listed on the Shenzhen Stock Exchange - ChiNext Board
