= SZSE Composite Index =

Stock market index in China

- Operator: op
- Exchanges: Shenzhen Stock Exchange
- Constituents: all stock
- Type: large to micro cap

SZSE Composite Index (Chinese: 深证综合指数) is a stock market index of Shenzhen Stock Exchange. It included all companies listed on the exchange.

== See also ==
- SSE Composite Index
- Hang Seng Composite Index
