= Shenzhen Stock Exchange =

Stock exchange in Shenzhen, China

- 深圳证券交易所

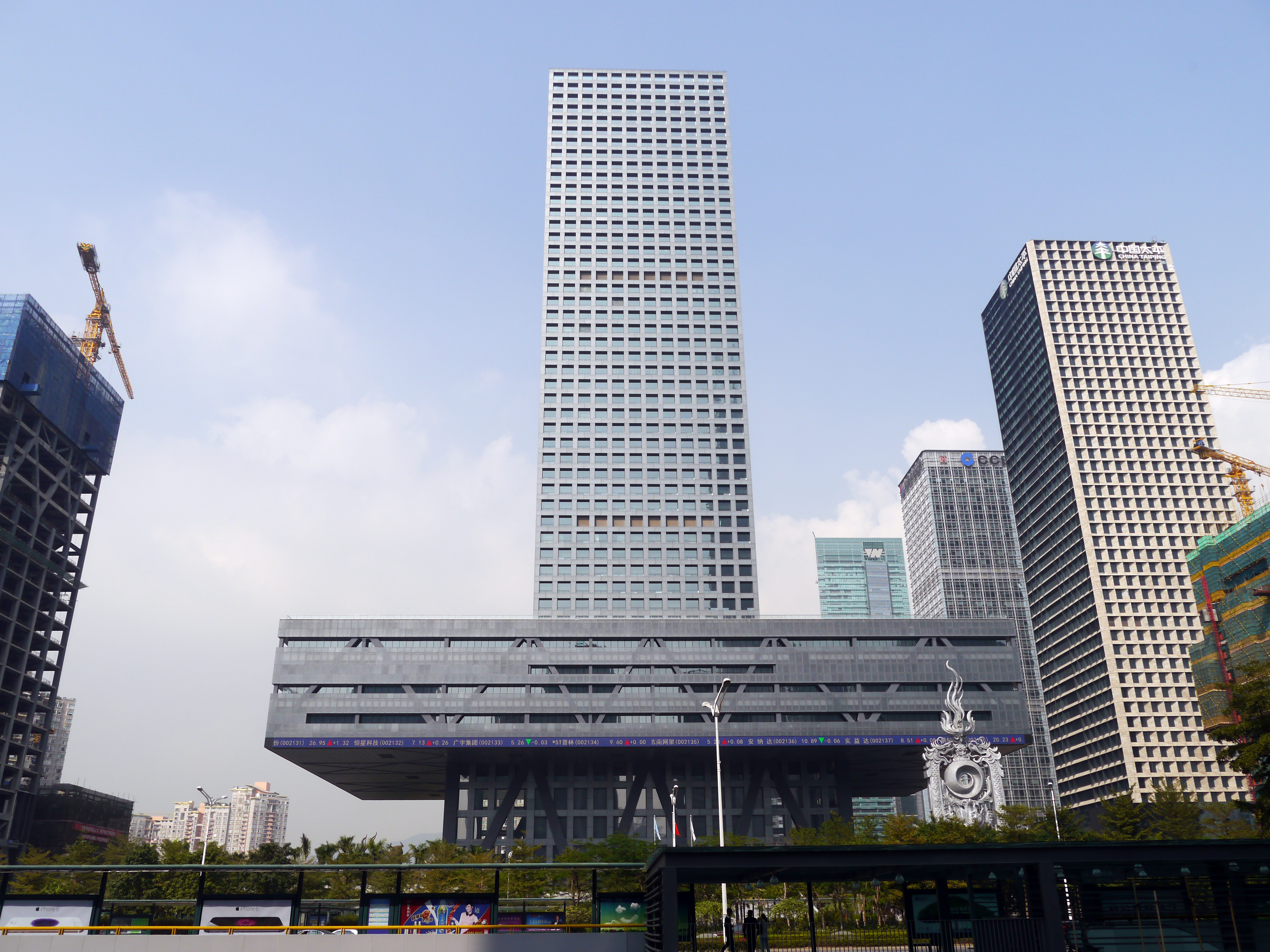
- Type: Stock exchange
- Location: Shenzhen, China
- Coordinates: 22°32′39″N 114°02′56″E
- Founded: 1987 (unofficially); 1 December 1990 (formally); 3 July 1991 (opened)
- Key people: Wu Lijun (Chairman); Wang Jianjun (President and CEO)
- Currency: CNY
- No. of listings: 2,879 (February 2026)
- Market cap: ¥50.035 trillion ($7.35 trillion) (May 2026)
- Indices: SZSE 100 (blue chip); SZSE 200; SZSE 300; SZSE Component (major index); SZSE 700; SZSE 1000; SZSE Composite
- Website: szse.cn

Chinese name
- Simplified Chinese: 深圳证券交易所
- Traditional Chinese: 深圳證券交易所
Transcriptions
Standard Mandarin
- Hanyu Pinyin: Shēnzhèn Zhèngquàn Jiāoyìsuǒ
Yue: Cantonese
- Jyutping: sam^{1} zan^{3} zing^{3} hyun^{3} gaau^{1} jik^{6} so^{2}

Alternative Chinese name
- Chinese: 深交所
Transcriptions
Standard Mandarin
- Hanyu Pinyin: Shēn Jiāosuǒ
Yue: Cantonese
- Jyutping: sam^{1} gaau^{1} so^{2}

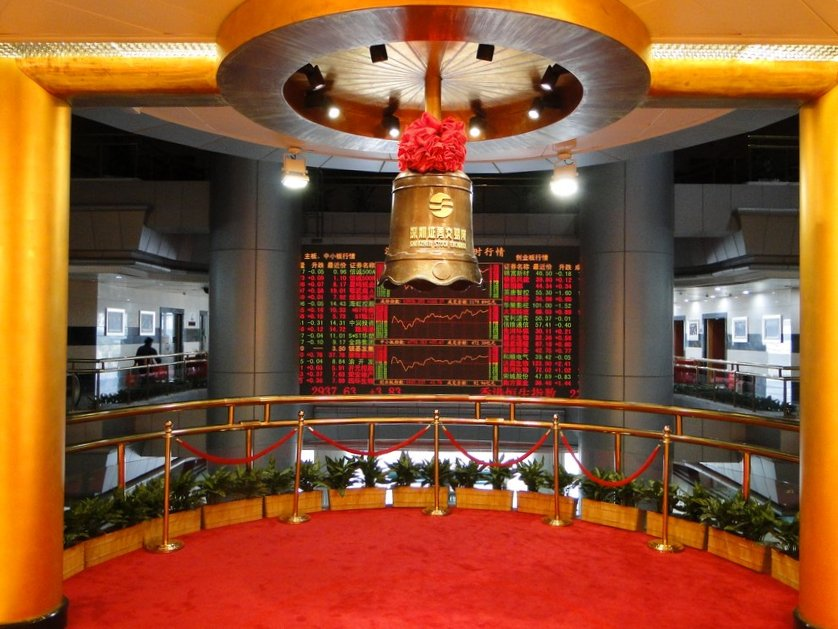
Shenzhen Stock Exchange (inner view)

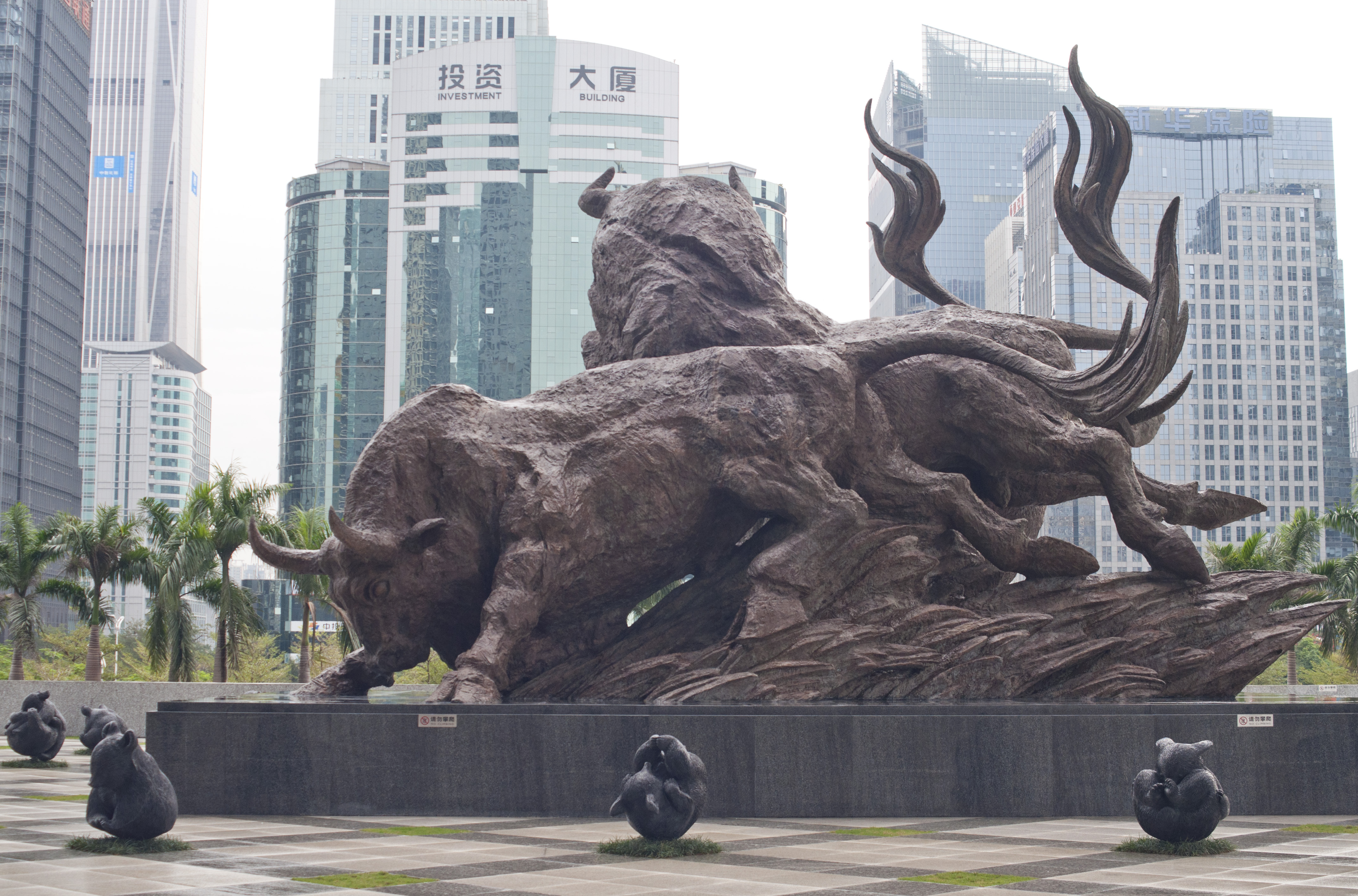
Sculpture in front of Shenzhen Stock Exchange

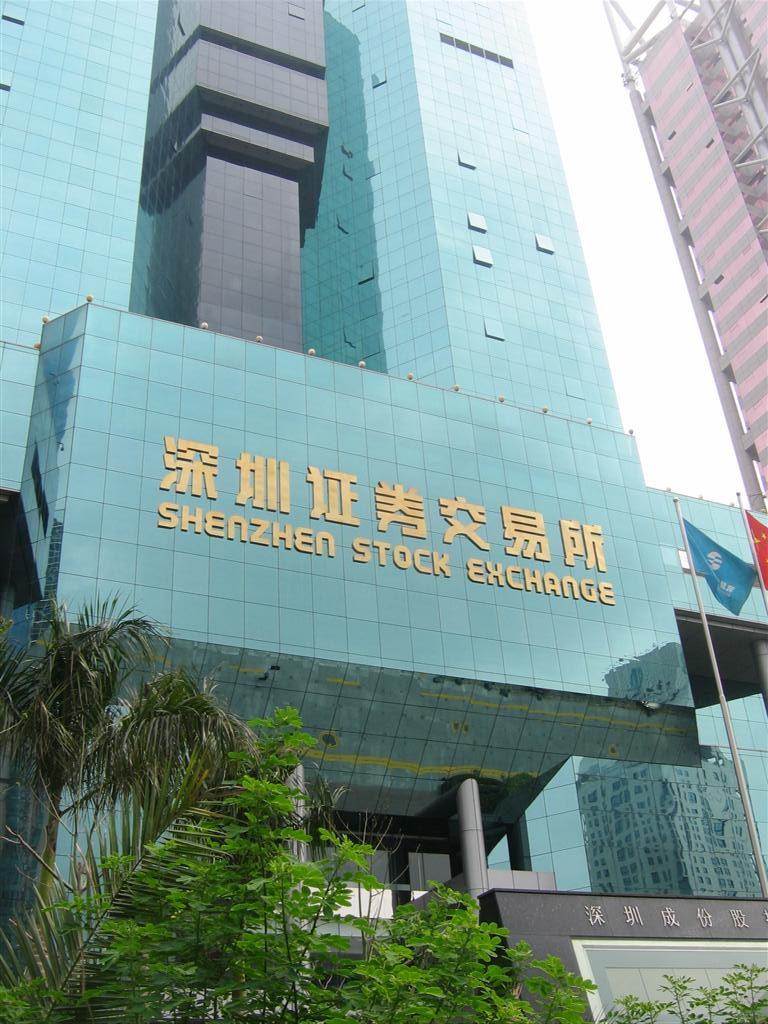
Former site of Shenzhen Stock Exchange

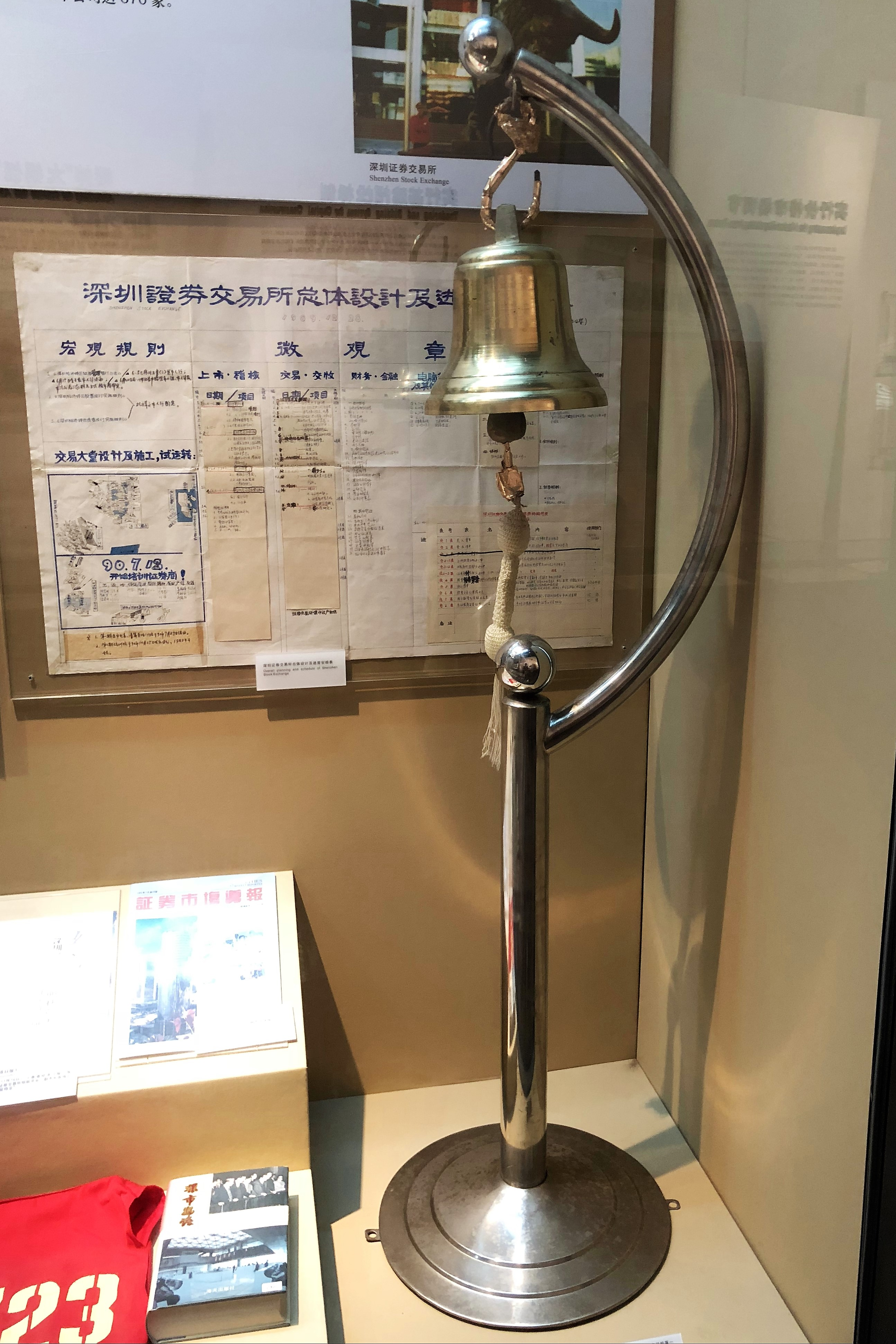
On November 22nd, 1990, the first transaction bell of Chinese security market rang. This is the opening bell of the stock market.

The Shenzhen Stock Exchange (SZSE) is a stock exchange based in the city of Shenzhen, in the People's Republic of China. It is one of three stock exchanges operating independently in Mainland China, the others being the Beijing Stock Exchange and the Shanghai Stock Exchange. It is situated in the Futian district of Shenzhen. The SZSE is the world's 6th largest stock exchange with a market capitalization exceeding US$7.35 trillion in May 2026.

== History ==
On 1 December 1990, Shenzhen Stock Exchange was founded. As an idea adapted from the capitalist countries, it was politically controversial in China. In support of the stock exchange, Deng Xiaoping rhetorically asked, "Are securities and the stock markets good or bad? Do they entail dangers? Are they peculiar to capitalism? Can socialism make use of them?" Deng contended that China must try them out and reserve judgment, because if securities and the stock market went well, they could be expanded, and if not, they could be stopped.

In January 1992, Deng Xiaoping's Southern Tour saved China's capital market and the two stock exchanges (the other was the Shanghai Stock Exchange).

Before 1997, the Shenzhen Stock Exchange was under municipal control and termed an "experimental point".

In July 1997, the State Council of China decided that the Shenzhen Stock Exchange would be directly managed by the China Securities Regulatory Commission. It also affirmed that China's stock exchanges had a legitimate role in the socialist market economy.

In 2004, the Small and Medium Enterprise Board was launched.

In October 2009, the ChiNext market (Chinese: 创业板) was inaugurated.

== Hours ==
The exchange has pre-market sessions from 09:15 am to 09:25 am and normal trading sessions from 09:30 am to 11:30 am and 1:00 pm to 3:00 pm China Standard Time (UTC+08:00) on all days of the week except Saturdays, Sundays and holidays declared by the Exchange in advance.

== ChiNext ==
The exchange opened the ChiNext board (Chinese: 创业板), a NASDAQ-type exchange for high-growth, high-tech start-ups, on 23 October 2009.

=== Overview ===
ChiNext is also called the second stock trading market. It refers to the securities trading market outside the main board. It provides growth space for small and medium-sized enterprises and emerging companies that cannot be listed in the main board. It is an effective supplement to the main board market. The biggest feature of the ChiNext is that it has low entry barriers and strict operation requirements, which help potential small and medium-sized enterprises obtain financing opportunities.

History

The establishment of the ChiNext was a response to the growing demand for alternative financing options for small and medium-sized enterprises (SMEs) in China. Prior to its creation, many SMEs had difficulty raising capital as they did not meet the strict listing requirements of China's established stock exchanges in Shanghai and Shenzhen.

The ChiNext was launched with 28 listed companies and quickly gained attention from investors as a platform for investing in high-growth industries such as technology, healthcare, and renewable energy. Over time, the number of listed companies on the ChiNext has grown, and as of 2021, there are over 800 companies listed on the exchange.

In the years since its establishment, the ChiNext has undergone several reforms aimed at improving transparency, promoting more sustainable growth, and reducing risks associated with speculative trading. For example, in 2016, the exchange introduced a new registration-based IPO system, which simplified the listing process for new companies.

=== Influences ===
The influences of ChiNext includes boosting innovation and entrepreneurship and attracting foreign investment. Specifically, ChiNext has played a key role in promoting innovation and entrepreneurship in China by providing a platform for smaller and innovative companies to raise capital and grow their businesses. This has led to the development of startups and technology companies in China.

== Market data ==
(As of January 2021)

- Listed companies: 2,375
- Market capitalization: RMB 34,463,161.66million (US$5.24 trillion)

== Listings ==
=== Major listing requirements ===
The listing requirements for the Shenzhen Stock Exchange (SZSE) are established by the China Securities Regulatory Commission and are designed to ensure the quality of companies listed on the exchange. The major listing requirements for the SZSE include:

1. Minimum size requirements: Companies seeking to list on the SZSE must have a certain level of size, as measured by net assets or revenue.
2. Financial performance: Companies must demonstrate a strong financial performance, with a track record of profitability and positive cash flow. Specifically, one of the following requirements must be met: 1.The estimated market value is not less than 1 billion yuan, the net profit in the most recent year is positive, and the operating income is not less than 100 million yuan; 2. The estimated market value is not less than 5 billion yuan, and the operating income in the most recent year is not less than 300 million yuan.
3. Corporate governance: Companies must demonstrate a commitment to good corporate governance, with a clear and transparent management structure. Specifically, the issuer's basic accounting practice is proper and its preparation and disclosure of the financial statements is in compliance with the Accounting Standards for Business Enterprises and relevant information disclosure rules, and fairly reflects in all material respects its financial position, the results of operations and cash flows, and its financial report has been issued an unqualified opinion by a CPA in the last three years.
4. Disclosure and transparency: Companies must provide full and timely disclosure of financial and other information, and must comply with all regulatory reporting requirements.

== Building ==
The Shenzhen Stock Exchange building is a skyscraper with a height of 245.8 metres (806 ft) and 49 floors. Its construction started in 2008 and was finished in 2013. The building was designed by Rem Koolhaas's firm, the Office for Metropolitan Architecture. The building is located at 2012 Shennan Blvd., Futian District. With an area of 200,000 square metres, five high speed elevators and a futuristic design, the partners involved in the design and construction of this sky scraper included Rem Koolhaas, David Gianotten, Ellen van Loon and Shohei Shigematsu and construction by The Second Construction Co., Ltd of China Construction Third Engineering Bureau, a subsidiary of China State Construction Engineering Corporation.

== See also ==
- China Securities Regulatory Commission
- Hong Kong Stock Exchange
- Shanghai Stock Exchange
- Untraded shares
- Deng Xiaoping's Southern Tour

=== Lists ===
- List of companies of China
- List of East Asian stock exchanges
- List of stock exchanges
