= List of companies of China =

Location of China

Since the introduction of the reform and opening up in 1978, the Chinese economy has become one of the world's fastest-growing major economies. As of 2016, it was the world's second-largest economy by nominal GDP and largest by purchasing power parity (PPP). China was also the world's largest exporter and second-largest importer of goods. China is a member of numerous formal and informal multilateral organizations, including the WTO, APEC, BRICS, the Shanghai Cooperation Organisation (SCO), the BCIM, and the G-20.

A company incorporated in any of China's special administrative regions is not considered to be incorporated in China. See the corresponding list for companies incorporated in China's special administrative regions. For further information on the types of business entities in this country and their abbreviations, see business entities in China.

== Largest firms ==
This list shows firms in the Fortune Global 500, which ranks firms by total revenues reported before 31 March 2023. Only the top five firms (if available) are included as a sample.

Rank	Name	2023 Revenues (US$M)	Employees	Notes
3	State Grid Corporation of China	530,008.8	870,287	Massive national infrastructure monopoly for electricity, the firm is by far the largest utility in the world. The entity maintained the #3 position in 2023, just behind Walmart and Saudi Aramco.
5	China National Petroleum Corporation	483,019.2	1,087,049	China's primary state oil & gas entity. CNPC was overtaken by Amazon and slipped from #4 to #5 in 2023.
6	Sinopec Group	471,154.2	527,487	China's second-largest state-owned fossil fuel company. Sinopec specialises in refining crude oil into a variety of consumer products.
13	China State Construction Engineering	305,884.5	382,492	Largest construction firm in the world, The company furthers China's "Belt and Road" initiative, a strategic push by the Chinese government to extend the country's international influence by funding infrastructure projects abroad.
28	Industrial and Commercial Bank of China	214,766.3	427,587	A state-run entity that is the largest commercial bank in the world by revenue, with assets valued at more than $5.7 trillion. ICBC has moved aggressively into international markets.

== Notable firms ==
This list includes notable companies with primary headquarters located in the country. The industry and sector follow the Industry Classification Benchmark taxonomy. Organizations which have ceased operations are included and noted as defunct.

Notable companies Status: P=Private, S=State; A=Active, D=Defunct
Name	Industry	Sector	Headquarters	Founded	Notes	Status	
361 Degrees	Consumer goods	Clothing & accessories	Jinjiang	2003	Sporting goods	P	A
Agricultural Bank of China	Financials	Banks	Beijing	1951	Bank	S	A
Aigo	Consumer goods	Consumer electronics	Beijing	1993	Consumer electronics	P	A
Air China	Consumer services	Airlines	Beijing	1988	Flag-carrier airline	S	A
Alibaba Group	Technology	Internet	Hangzhou	1999	Online holdings, manages apps and websites such as AliExpress, Taobao, Tmall, 1688.com and Youku, created online payment platform Alipay	P	A
Aluminum Corporation of China Limited	Basic materials	Aluminum	Beijing	2001	Aluminum	S	A
Amoi	Industrials	Electronic equipment	Xiamen	1997	Electronics manufacturing	P	A
Anker	Consumer goods	Consumer electronics	Changsha	2011	Consumer electronics	P	A
Anta Sports	Consumer goods	Clothing & accessories	Jinjiang	1994	Sportswear	P	A
AVIC	Industrials	Aerospace and defense	Beijing	1951	Aircraft	S	A
BAIC Group	Consumer goods	Automobiles	Beijing	1958	State-owned automotive	S	A
Baidu	Technology	Internet	Beijing	2000	Web services, such as browsers and map navigation apps, created or owned iQIYI, Baidu Tieba, Baidu Maps	P	A
Bank of China	Financials	Banks	Beijing	1912	State-owned bank	S	A
Bank of Communications	Financials	Banks	Shanghai	1908	Bank	S	A
Baowu	Basic materials	Iron & steel	Shanghai	1978	Steel	S	A
BBK Electronics	Consumer goods	Consumer electronics	Dongguang	1998	Consumer electronics	P	D
Beijing Hualian Group	Consumer services	Broadline retailers	Beijing	1993	Retailer	P	A
Bilibili	Technology	Internet	Shanghai	2009	Video sharing	P	A
Bosideng	Consumer goods	Clothing & accessories	Shanghai	1975	Apparel	P	A
Brilliance Auto	Consumer goods	Automobiles	Shenyang	1991	Automobiles	P	A
BYD Company	Consumer goods	Automobiles	Xi'an	1995	Automobile, bus, etc.	P	A
ByteDance	Technology	Internet	Beijing	2012	App developer, created TikTok, CapCut, Lemon8 etc.	P	A
CALB	Industrials	Electronic equipment	Changzhou	2007	Lithium-ion batteries	P	A
CATL	Industrials	Electronic equipment	Ningde	2011	Lithium-ion batteries	P	A
Changan Automobile	Consumer goods	Automobiles	Chongqing	1962	State-owned automotive	S	A
Changhe	Consumer goods	Automobiles	Jingdezhen	1970	Automobiles	S	A
Changhong	Consumer goods	Durable household products	Mianyang	1958	Appliances	P	A
Changhong Technology	Basic materials	Commodity chemicals	Shenzhen	1987	Plastic	P	A
Cheers Wines	Consumer Goods	Wines	Beijing	2011	Wines	P	A
ChemChina	Basic materials	Speciality chemicals	Beijing	1984	Chemicals	S	A
Chery Automobile	Consumer goods	Automobiles	Wuhu	1997	Automobiles	S	A
Chicecream	Consumer staples	Food producers	Shanghai	2018	Ice cream	P	A
China Clean Energy	Basic materials	Specialty chemicals	Fuqing	1995	Specialty chemicals, Energy	P	A
China Communications Construction	Industrials	Heavy construction	Beijing	2005	Construction	S	A
China Construction Bank	Financials	Banks	Beijing	1954	Bank	S	A
China COSCO Shipping	Industrials	Marine transportation	Shanghai	2016	Formed from COSCO and China Shipping Group	S	A
China Dongxiang	Consumer goods	Clothing & accessories	Beijing	2007	Sportswear	P	A
China Eastern Airlines	Consumer services	Airlines	Shanghai	1988	Airline	S	A
China Electronics Corporation	Consumer goods	Consumer electronics	Shenzhen	1989	Computer software	S	A
China Housing and Land Development	Financials	Banks	Xi'an	1992	Real estate	P	A
China International Marine Containers	Industrials	Marine transportation	Shenzhen	1980	Shipping, logistics	S	A
China Life Insurance Company	Financials	Life insurance	Beijing	1949	Life insurance	S	A
China Medical Technologies	Health care	Medical technology	Beijing	2004	Medical devices	P	D
China Merchants Bank	Financials	Banks	Shenzhen	1987	Bank	S	A
China Merchants Energy Shipping	Industrials	Marine transportation	Shanghai	2004	Shipping line	S	A
China Metal Recycling	Industrials	Waste & disposal services	Guangzhou	2000	Recycling	P	A
China Minmetals	Basic materials	Metals & minerals	Beijing	1950	Trading	S	A
China Mobile	Telecommunications	Mobile telecommunications	Beijing	1997	State-owned mobile	S	A
China National Building Material	Industrials	Building materials	Beijing	1984	Construction	S	A
China National Erzhong Group	Industrials	Diversified industrials	Deyang	1958	Forge and metal working	S	A
China National Nuclear Corporation	Energy	Nuclear power	Beijing	1955	Nuclear technology	S	A
China National Offshore Oil Corporation	Oil & gas	Exploration & production	Beijing	1982	Oil company	S	A
China National Petroleum Corporation	Oil & gas	Exploration & production	Beijing	1988	State-owned oil & gas	S	A
China Nepstar	Health care	Pharmaceuticals	Shenzhen	1995	Pharmacy chain	P	A
China Netcom	Technology	Internet	Beijing	1999	Internet, defunct 2008	P	D
China Pabst Blue Ribbon	Consumer goods	Brewers	Zhaoqing	1988	Brewery	P	A
China Poly Group	Conglomerate	Fine arts	Beijing	1999	auctions	S	A
China Post	Industrials	Delivery services	Beijing	1997	Postal service, shipping	S	A
China Railway	Industrials	Rail transport	Beijing	2013	Passenger rail	S	A
China Resources	Consumer goods	Conglomerate	Shenzhen	1938	-	S	A
China Shipping Group	Industrials	Marine transportation	Beijing	1997	Merged into China COSCO Shipping	P	D
China Southern Airlines	Consumer services	Airlines	Guangzhou	1988	Airline	P	A
China State Construction Engineering	Industrials	Heavy construction	Beijing	1957	State construction and contracting	S	A
China Telecom	Telecommunications	Fixed line telecommunications	Beijing	2000	State-owned communications	S	A
China Three Gorges Corporation	Utilities	Alternative electricity	Beijing	1993	Principal for the Three Gorges Dam	S	A
China Tobacco	Consumer goods	Tobacco	Beijing	1982	Tobacco	S	A
China Unicom	Telecommunications	Mobile telecommunications	Beijing	1994	State-owned mobile network	S	A
China Universal	Financials	Investment services	Shanghai	2005	Investment management	P	A
China Wu Yi	Industrials	Heavy construction	Fuzhou	1994	Construction	P	A
China Zhongwang	Basic materials	Aluminum	Liaoyang	1993	Aluminum	P	A
Chunlan Group	Industrials	Electronic equipment	Taizhou	1985	Air conditioners, engines	P	A
CITIC Group	Financials	Investment services	Beijing	1979	Investment management	S	A
COFCO Group	Consumer goods	Food processing	Beijing	1949	Food	S	A
Comac	Industrials	Aerospace	Shanghai	2008	Aircraft	S	A
Commercial Press	Consumer services	Publishing	Beijing	1897	Publishing	P	A
COSCO	Industrials	Marine transportation	Beijing	1961	Shipping line, now China COSCO Shipping	P	D
CRRC	Industrials	Railroads	Beijing	2015	Railway transport	S	A
CSG Holding	Industrials	Glass	Shenzhen	1984	Glass	P	A
Dalian Hi-Think Computer (DHC)	Industrials	Business support services	Dalian	1996	Outsourcing	P	A
Dashang Group	Consumer services	Broadline retailers	Dalian	1995	Department stores	P	A
Dayun Group	Industrials	Automobiles	Yuncheng	1987	Engines, trucks, motorcycles, etc.	P	A
Dicos	Consumer services	Restaurants & bars	Chengdu	1994	Fast food	P	A
DiDi	Technology	Internet	Beijing	2012	Taxi and vehicle ride services	P	A
Dongfeng Motor Corporation	Consumer goods	Automobiles	Wuhan	1969	State-owned automotive	S	A
Duoyuan Global Water	Industrials	Industrial machinery	Beijing	1992	Equipment for water systems	P	D
DXY.cn	Technology	Internet	Zhenjiang	2000	Online community	P	A
Eisoo	Technology	Internet	Shanghai	2006	Cloud computing	P	A
Ellington Electronics Technology Group	Industrials	Electronic equipment	Zhongshan City	2000	Printed circuit boards	P	A
Eno	Consumer goods	Clothing & accessories	Shanghai	2006	Apparel	P	A
ERKE	Consumer goods	Clothing & accessories	Quanzhou	2000	Sportwear	P	A
EVE Energy	Industrials	Electronic equipment	Huizhou	2001	Lithium-ion batteries	P	A
FAW Group	Consumer goods	Automobiles	Changchun	1953	State-owned automotive	S	A
Feicheng Acid Chemicals	Basic materials	Specialty chemicals	Feicheng	1994	Chemicals	P	A
Feiyue	Consumer goods	Footwear	Shanghai	1920	Shoes	P	A
Foshan Haitian	Consumer goods	Food products	Foshan	1955	Food	P	A
Founder Group	Technology	Computer services	Beijing	1986	Information technology, part of Peking University	P	A
Fushi Copperweld	Industrials	Electronic equipment	Beijing	1915	Electrical conductors	P	A
GAC Group	Consumer goods	Automobiles	Guangzhou	1997	State-owned automotive	S	A
Geely	Consumer goods	Automobiles	Hangzhou	1986	Automobiles	P	A
Gome	Consumer services	Specialty retailers	Beijing	1987	Appliance retailer	P	A
Gotion	Industrials	Electronic equipment	Hefei	2006	Lithium-ion batteries	P	A
GMY Lighting Technology	Lights and lighting technology	Technology	Heshan, Guangdong	1998	Specialty lighting components	P	A
Great Leap Brewing	Consumer goods	Brewers	Beijing	2010	Microbrewery	P	A
Great Wall Motor	Consumer goods	Automobiles	Baoding	1984	Automobiles	P	A
Gree Electric	Consumer goods	Durable household products	Zhuhai	1989	Appliances	P	A
GreenTree Inns	Consumer services	Hotels	Shanghai	2004	Hotel chain	P	A
Gushan Environmental Energy	Oil & gas	Exploration & production	Fuzhou	2001	Energy	P	A
Hafei	Industrials	Electronic equipment	Harbin	1950	Engines, trucks	P	A
Haier	Consumer goods	Durable household products	Qingdao	1984	Consumer electronics, home appliances	P	A
Hainan Airlines	Consumer services	Airlines	Haikou	1993	Airline	P	A
Hangzhou Wahaha Group	Consumer goods	Soft drinks	Hangzhou	1987	Beverages	P	A
Harbin Brewery	Consumer goods	Brewers	Harbin	1900	Brewery	P	A
Harbin Pharmaceutical Group	Health care	Pharmaceuticals	Shanghai	1988	Pharmaceuticals	S	A
Hasee	Consumer goods	Consumer electronics	Shenzhen	1995	Computers, tablets, mobile phones	P	A
Hefei Meiling	Consumer goods	Durable household products	Hefei	1992	Appliances	P	A
Hengan	Basic materials	Paper	Jinjiang	1985	Paper	P	A
Hisense	Consumer goods	Consumer electronics	Qingdao	1969	Consumer electronics, home appliances, mobile phones	P	A
HiSilicon	Technology	Semiconductors	Shenzhen	2004	Semiconductors, part of Huawei	P	A
Honor	Consumer goods	Consumer electronics	Shenzhen	2013	Consumer electronics	P	A
Hotgen Biotech	Technology	Pharmaceuticals	Beijing	2005	Biotechnology	P	A
Huawei	Consumer goods	Consumer electronics, Telecommunications equipment	Shenzhen	1987	Computers, mobile phones, tablets, telecommunication equipment	P	A
Huayi Brothers Media Corporation	Consumer services	Broadcasting & entertainment	Beijing	1994	Media	P	A
Huiyuan Juice	Consumer goods	Soft drinks	Beijing	1992	Privately owned juice and beverage	P	A
Hytera	Industrials	Electronic equipment	Shenzhen	1993	Radios and telecommunications	P	A
Industrial and Commercial Bank of China	Financials	Banks	Beijing	1984	Commercial bank	S	A
Inspur	Technology	Computer services	Jinan	2000	IT	P	A
JAC Group	Consumer goods	Automobiles	Hefei	1964	State-owned automotive	S	A
JD.com	Technology	Internet	Beijing	1998	E-commerce	P	A
JDB Group	Consumer goods	Soft drinks	Dongguan	1995	Beverage	P	A
Jiangling Motors	Consumer goods	Automobiles	Nanchang	1952	Automotive	P	A
Jiangling Motors Corporation Group	Consumer goods	Automobiles	Nanchang	1947	State-owned automotive	S	A
Jiangsu Hengrui	Health care	Pharmaceuticals	Lianyungang	1997	Pharmaceuticals	P	A
Jianlibao Group	Consumer goods	Soft drinks	Foshan	1984	Soft drink	P	A
Jiuguang Department Store	Consumer services	Broadline retailers	Shanghai	2004	Retail	P	A
Joyoung	Consumer goods	Durable household products	Jinan	1994	Home appliances	P	A
JXD	Industrials	Electronic equipment	Shenzhen	1995	Consumer electronics and games	P	A
Kingsoft	Technology	Software	Beijing	1989	Software	P	A
Kingway Brewery	Consumer goods	Brewers	Shenzhen	1990	State-owned brewery	S	A
Kuaishou	Technology	Internet	Beijing	2011	Social media app developer	P	A
Kweichow Moutai	Consumer goods	Brewers	Renhuai	1951	Distribution and production of the Baijiu and Maotai liquors.	P	A
Leapmotor	Consumer goods	Automobiles	Hangzhou	2015	Electric vehicles	P	A
Lenovo	Consumer goods	Consumer electronics	Beijing	1984	Computers, tablets, mobile phones	P	A
Li Auto	Consumer goods	Automobiles	Beijing	2015	Electric vehicles	P	A
Lifan Group	Consumer goods	Automobiles	Chongqing	1992	Automobile and motorcycle production	P	A
Li-Ning	Consumer goods	Footwear	Beijing	1990	Sporting goods	P	A
Little Sheep Group	Consumer services	Restaurants & bars	Baotou	1999	Restaurants, condiments	P	A
LiuGong	Industrials	Industrial machinery	Liuzhou	1993	Machinery	P	A
Loncin Holdings	Consumer goods	Automobiles	Chongqing	1983	Motorcycles	P	A
Lonking	Industrials	Commercial vehicles	Longyan	1993	Construction machinery	P	A
Luxshare	Industrials	Electronic equipment	Shenzhen	2004	Electronics manufacturing	P	A
Mailman Group	Technology	Internet	Shanghai	1999	Technology and social media agency	P	A
Maoye International	Consumer services	Broadline retailers	Shenzhen	1996	Department stores	P	A
Meituan	Technology	Internet	Beijing	2010	On-demand food delivery service, created Dianping, Mobike	P	A
Meizu	Consumer goods	Telecommunications equipment	Zhuhai	2003	Mobile phones	P	A
Mengniu Dairy	Consumer goods	Food products	Hohhot	1995	Dairy products, ice cream	P	A
Meters/bonwe	Consumer goods	Clothing & accessories	Shanghai	1995	Apparel	P	A
Midea Group	Consumer goods	Durable household products	Beijiao	1968	Appliances	P	A
Mingyang Wind Power	Utilities	Alternative electricity	Zhongshan	2006	Wind power	P	A
Miniso	Consumer services	Broadline retailers	Guangzhou	2011	Low-cost variety stores	P	A
Mr. Lee	Consumer services	Restaurants & bars	Beijing	1988	Fast food	P	A
Nanjing Automobile	Consumer goods	Automobiles	Nanjing	1947	State-owned automotive, part of SAIC Motor	S	A
Neusoft	Technology	Software	Shenyang	1991	Software	P	A
Ningbo Bird	Telecommunications	Mobile telecommunications	Fenghua District	1992	Mobile phones	P	A
Nio	Consumer goods	Automobiles	Shanghai	2014	Electric vehicles	P	A
Niu Technologies	Consumer goods	Recreational products	Beijing	2014	Electronic scooters	P	A
Opple Lighting	Industrials	Building materials & fixtures	Zhongshan	1996	Lighting	P	A
Oppo	Consumer goods	Consumer electronics	Shenzhen	2004	Consumer electronics	P	A
Panda Electronics	Consumer goods	Consumer electronics	Nanjing	1936	Consumer electronics	P	A
Peak Sport Products	Consumer goods	Clothing & accessories	Quanzhou	1989	Sportswear	P	A
Pearl River Piano Group	Consumer goods	Recreational products	Guangzhou	1956	Pianos	P	A
People's Insurance Company of China	Financials	Full line insurance	Beijing	1949	Insurance	S	A
Pinduoduo	Technology	Internet	Shanghai	2015	E-commerce, created Temu	P	A
Ping An Bank	Financials	Banks	Shenzhen	1995	Bank, part of Ping An Insurance	P	A
Ping An Insurance	Financials	Full line insurance	Shenzhen	1988	Insurance	P	A
Qihoo 360	Technology	Software	Beijing	2005	Software	P	A
Qinghai Huading Industrial	Industrials	Industrial machinery	Xining	1998	Mechanical products	P	A
SAIC-GM	Consumer goods	Automobiles	Shanghai	1997	Joint venture with General Motors (US) and SAIC Motor	P	A
SAIC-GM-Wuling	Consumer goods	Automobiles	Liuzhou	2002	Joint venture with General Motors (US), Guangxi Automobile Group and SAIC Motor	P	A
SAIC Motor	Consumer goods	Automobiles	Shanghai	1955	State-owned automotive	S	A
Sany	Industrials	Industrial machinery	Changsha	1989	Machinery	P	A
SDLG	Industrials	Industrial machinery	Linyi	1972	Machinery, joint with Volvo Construction Equipment (Sweden)	P	A
Septwolves	Consumer goods	Clothing	Jinjiang	1990	Clothing	P	A
SF Express	Industrials	Delivery services	Shenzhen	1993	Logistics	P	A
Shaanxi Automobile Group	Industrials	Commercial vehicles	Xi'an	1968	Trucks, buses	P	A
Shaanxi Yanchang Petroleum	Oil & gas	Exploration & production	Xi'an	1905	State-owned oil & gas	S	A
Shanghai Film Group Corporation	Consumer services	Broadcasting & entertainment	Shanghai	2001	Film production	P	A
Shanghai Pharmaceuticals	Health care	Pharmaceuticals	Shanghai	1994	Pharmaceuticals	P	A
Shanghai Pudong Development Bank	Financials	Banks	Shanghai	1993	Commercial bank	P	A
Shenzhen Airlines	Consumer services	Airlines	Shenzhen	1992	Airline	P	A
Shenzhen Energy	Utilities	Conventional electricity	Shenzhen	1993	Power generation	P	A
Shenzhen Media Group	Consumer services	Broadcasting & entertainment	Shenzhen	2004	Television and radio	P	A
Shinho	Consumer goods	Food products	Yantai	1992	Food	P	A
Shougang	Basic materials	Iron & steel	Beijing	1919	Steel	P	A
Shui On Land	Financials	Real estate holding & development	Shanghai	2004	Real estate	P	A
Sichuan Airlines	Consumer services	Airlines	Chengdu	1986	Airline	P	A
Sieyuan Electric	Industrials	Electrical equipment	Shanghai	1993	GIS,Transformer,DTCB,STATCOM	P	A
Simcere Pharmaceutical	Health care	Pharmaceuticals	Nanjing	1995	Generic drug manufacturer	P	A
Sina Corporation	Technology	Internet	Beijing	1998	Online services, created Sina Weibo	P	A
Sinoenergy	Oil & gas	Exploration & production	Qingdao	2004	Natural gas	P	A
Sinopec	Oil & gas	Exploration & production	Beijing	2000	Oil company	P	A
Sinopharm Group	Health care	Pharmaceuticals	Shanghai	1998	Pharmaceuticals, traditional medicine	P	A
Sinosteel	Basic materials	Iron & steel	Beijing	1993	Iron, steel	S	A
Sinovac Biotech	Health care	Pharmaceuticals	Beijing	1999	Research, development, manufacture and commercialization of vaccines	P	A
Skyworth	Consumer goods	Consumer electronics	Shenzhen	1988	Consumer electronics	P	A
SmithStreetSolutions	Industrials	Business support services	Shanghai	2007	Consulting	P	A
Sohu	Technology	Internet	Beijing	1996	Online services, created Sogou	P	A
State Grid Corporation of China	Utilities	Conventional electricity	Beijing	2002	Former State Power, national electric company	S	A
Suning Commerce Group	Consumer services	Broadline retailers	Nanjing	1990	Retail	P	A
Suntech Power	Industrials	Electronic equipment	Wuxi	2001	Photovoltaics (solar cell) manufacturer	P	A
Sunwoda	Industrials	Electronic equipment	Shenzhen	1997	Lithium-ion batteries	P	A
Suzhou Synta Optical Technology	Consumer goods	Recreational products	Suzhou	1988	Telescopes, optics, part of Synta Technology Corporation of Taiwan	P	A
SVOLT	Industrials	Electronic equipment	Changzhou	2018	Lithium-ion batteries	P	A
TCL Technology	Consumer goods	Consumer electronics	Huizhou	1981	Consumer electronics	P	A
Telesail Technology	Telecommunications	Fixed line telecommunications	Beijing	2005	Telecom equipment, services	P	A
Tencent	Conglomerate	-	Shenzhen	1998	Internet, software, mobile phones, online advertising, online gaming	P	A
Tianan Insurance	Financials	Full line insurance	Shanghai	1994	Insurance	P	A
Tianjin FAW	Consumer goods	Automobiles	Tianjin	1965	Automobiles	P	A
Tongrentang	Health care	Pharmaceuticals	Beijing	1669	Pharmaceuticals, traditional medicine	P	A
Topray Solar	Utilities	Alternative electricity	Shenzhen	1999	Solar energy	P	A
TP-Link	Technology	Telecommunications equipment	Shenzhen	1996	Computer networking devices	P	A
Trands	Consumer goods	Clothing & accessories	Dalian	1995	Menswear	P	A
Tsingtao Brewery	Consumer goods	Brewers	Qingdao	1903	Brewery	P	A
UnionPay	Financials	Consumer services	Shanghai	2002	Financial services	P	A
Vanke	Financials	Real estate holding & development	Shenzhen	1984	Real estate	P	A
Vinda International	Basic materials	Paper	Xinhui District	1985	Paper, part of Essity	P	A
Vipshop	Technology	Internet	Guangzhou	2008	E-commerce	P	A
Vivo	Consumer goods	Consumer electronics	Dongguang	2009	Consumer electronics	P	A
Vsun	Technology	Telecommunications equipment	Shenzhen	2011	Mobile phones	P	A
Wallace	Consumer services	Restaurants & bars	Fuzhou	1994	Fast food chain	P	A
Wanda Group	Conglomerates	-	Beijing	1988	Property developer, real estate, hospitality, retail, tourism, culture	P	A
WeLion	Industrials	Electronic equipment	Changzhou	2016	Semi-solid and solid-state batteries	P	A
Wumart	Consumer goods	Food retailers & wholesalers	Beijing	1994	Food retailer	P	A
WuXi PharmaTech	Health care	Pharmaceuticals	Shanghai	2000	Laboratory and manufacturing services	P	A
XCMG	Industrials	Industrial machinery	Xuzhou	1989	Machinery	P	A
Xiaomi	Technology	Consumer electronics	Beijing	2010	Consumer electronics such as mobile phones, laptops, smartwatches, and earbuds, electric scooters and cars, household appliances	P	A
XPeng	Consumer goods	Automobiles	Guangzhou	2014	Electric vehicles	P	A
Xtep	Consumer goods	Clothing & accessories	Quanzhou	2001	Sporting goods	P	A
Yadea	Consumer goods	Recreational products	Wuxi	2001	Electronic bicycles, motorcycles & scooters	P	A
YaqinAudio	Consumer goods	Consumer electronics	Foshan		Audio equipment	P	A
Yili Group	Consumer goods	Food products	Hohhot	1993	Dairy and ice-cream	P	A
Yonyou	Technology	Software	Beijing	1988	Software	P	A
Yutong	Industrials	Commercial vehicles	Zhengzhou	1963	Buses	P	A
ZGC Motors	Industrials	Industrial machinery	Changzhou	1998	Motors	P	A
Zhihu	Technology	Internet	Beijing	2011	Q&A website	P	A
Zhongjin Gold	Basic materials	Gold mining	Beijing	2000	Gold mining	P	A
Zhongjin Lingnan	Basic materials	Nonferrous metals	Shenzhen	1984	Metal	P	A
Zhujiang Beer	Consumer goods	Brewers	Guangzhou	1985	Brewery	S	A
Zoomlion	Industrials	Industrial machinery	Changsha	1992	Heavy machinery	P	A
ZTE	Technology	Telecommunications equipment	Shenzhen	1985	Telecom equipment	P	A
ZX Auto	Consumer goods	Automobiles	Baoding	1999	Automobiles	P	A

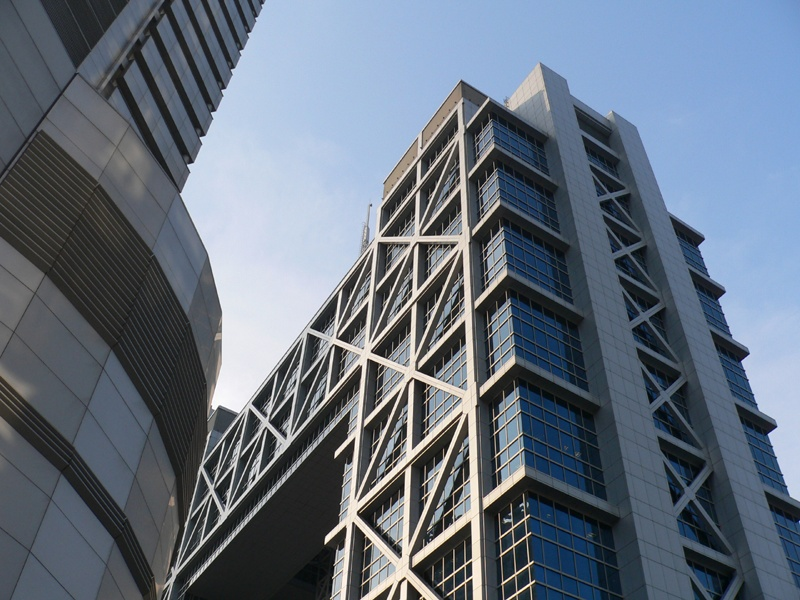
The Shanghai Stock Exchange building in Shanghai's Lujiazui financial district.

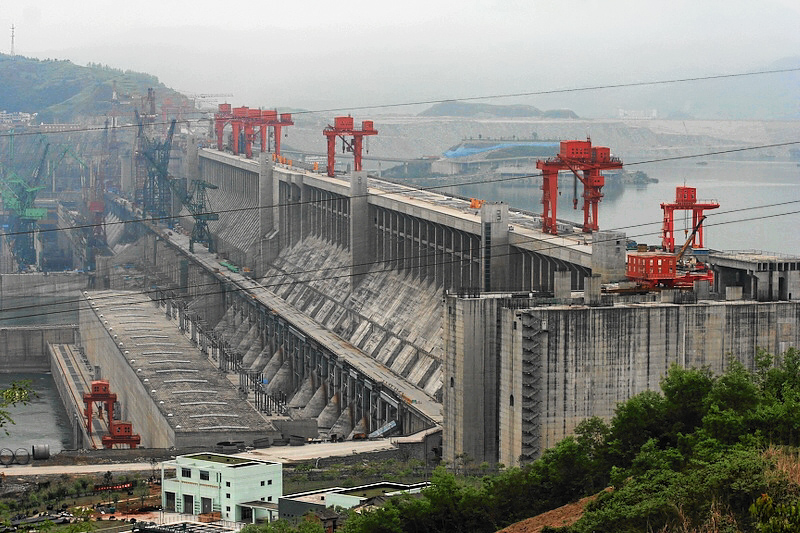
Three Gorges Dam, constructed by China Three Gorges Corporation.

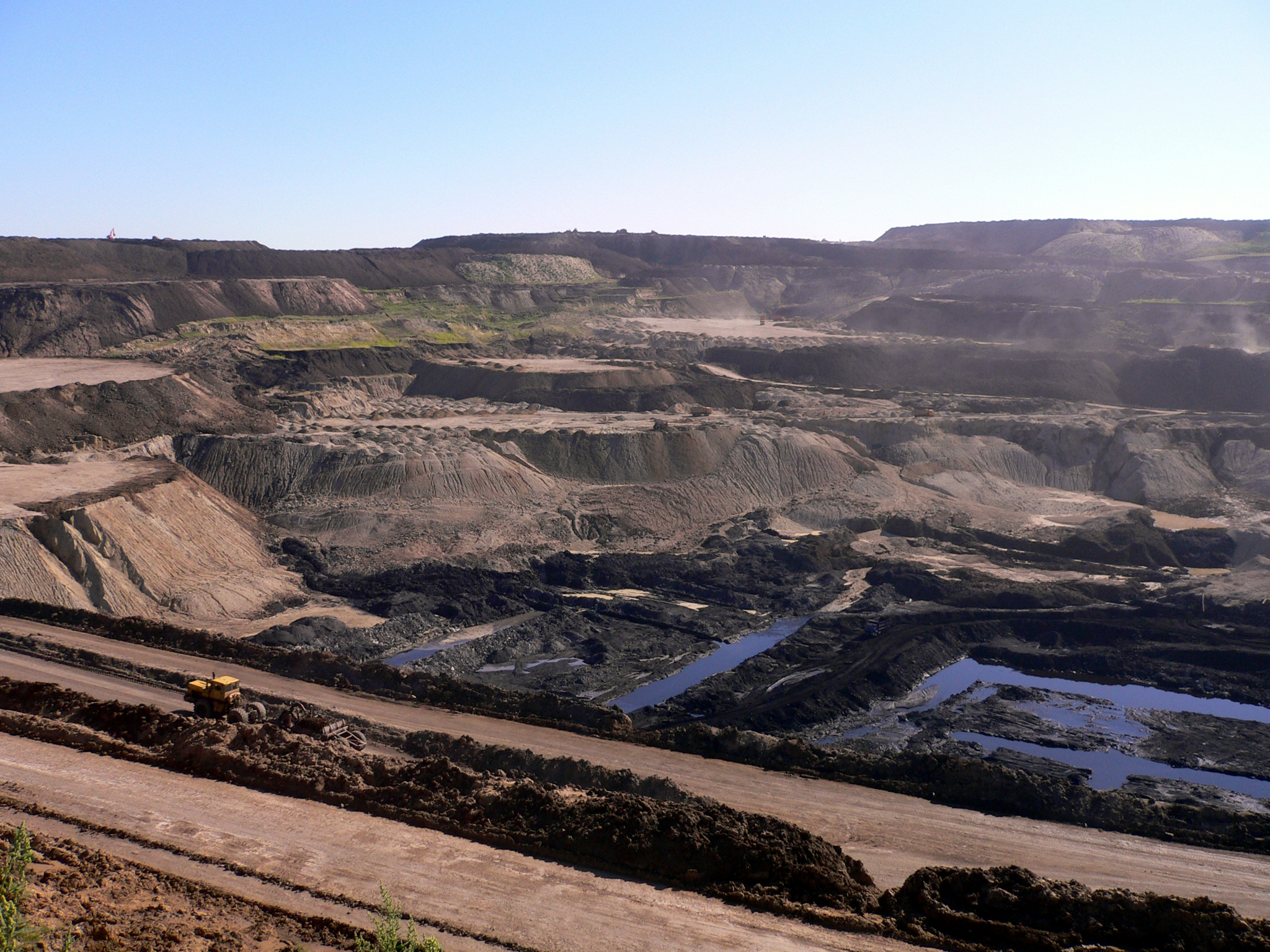
Coal mining in Inner Mongolia.

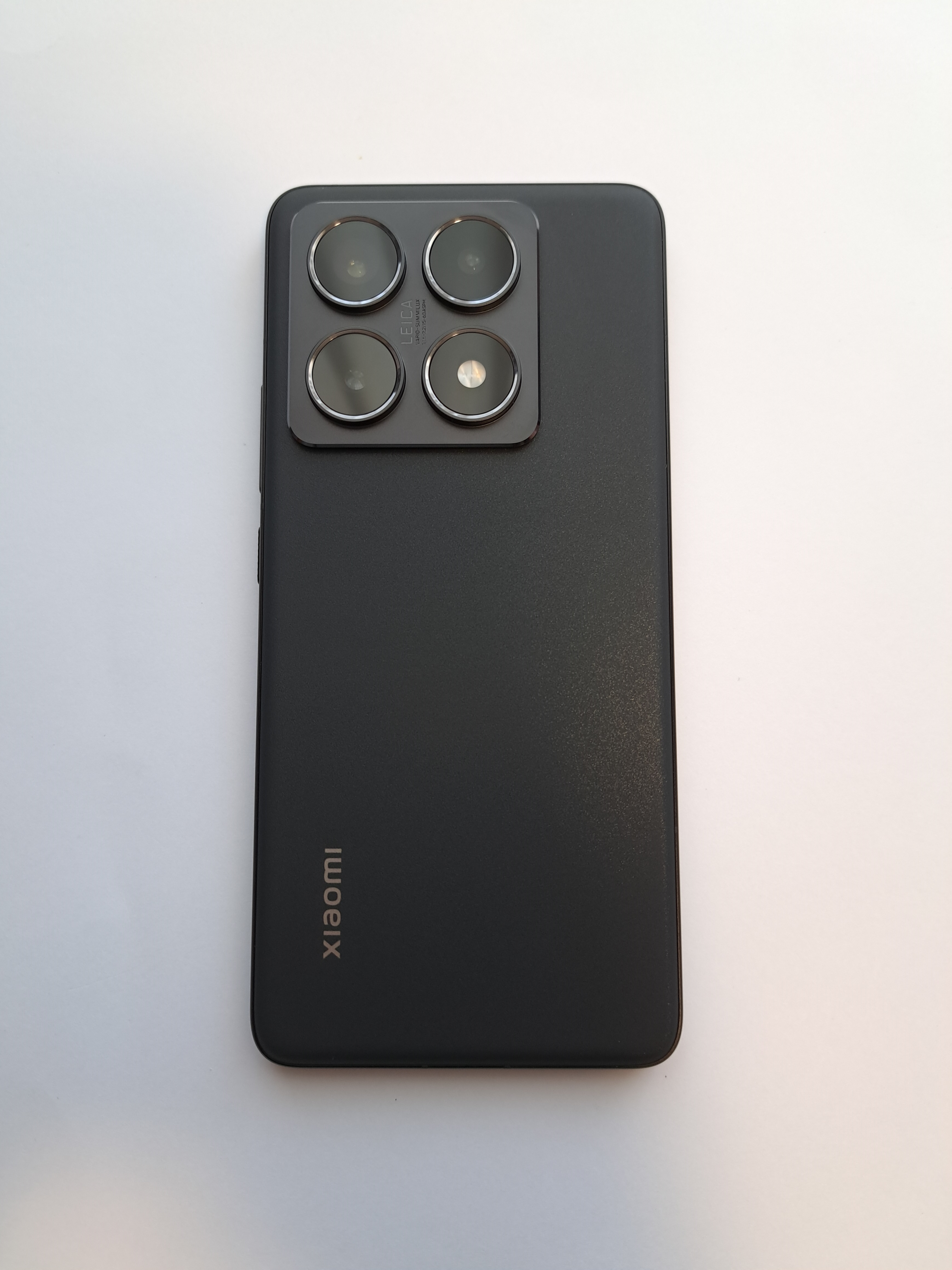
A Xiaomi 14T Pro phone produced by Xiaomi

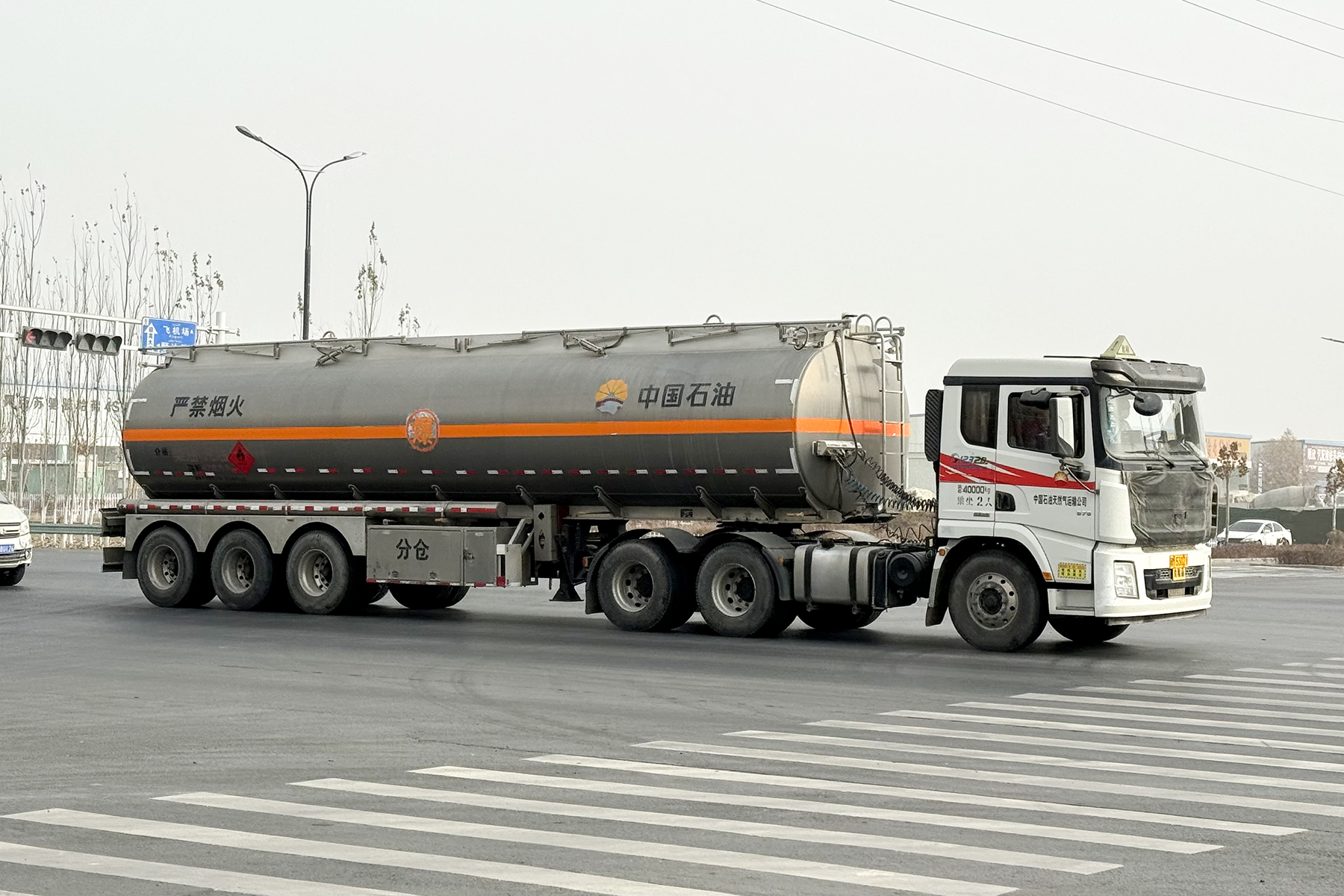
Tank truck transporting oil of PetroChina in Aksu

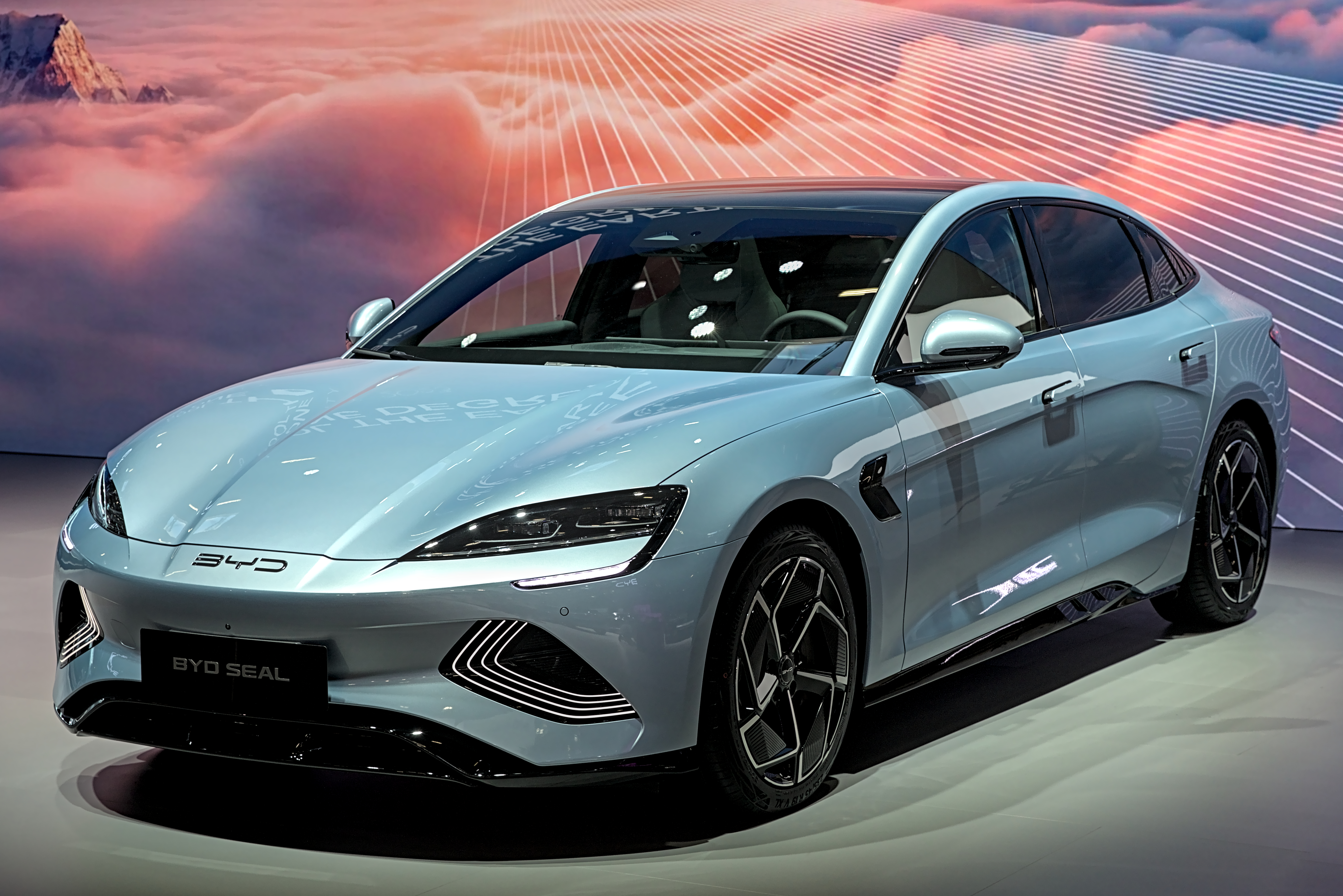
A BYD Seal electric car produced by BYD Auto

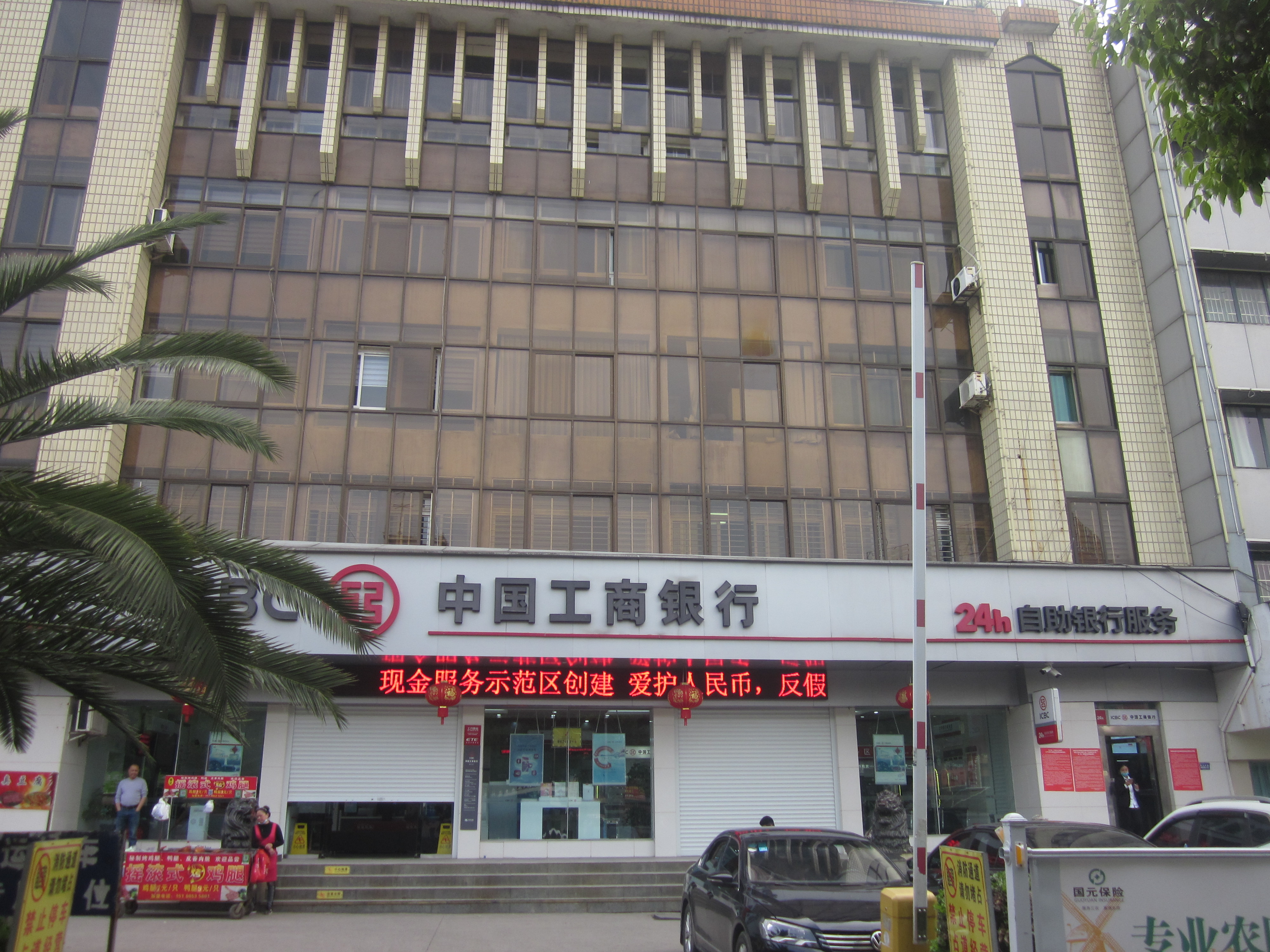
A location of the Industrial and Commercial Bank of China in Zhenning Buyei and Miao Autonomous County

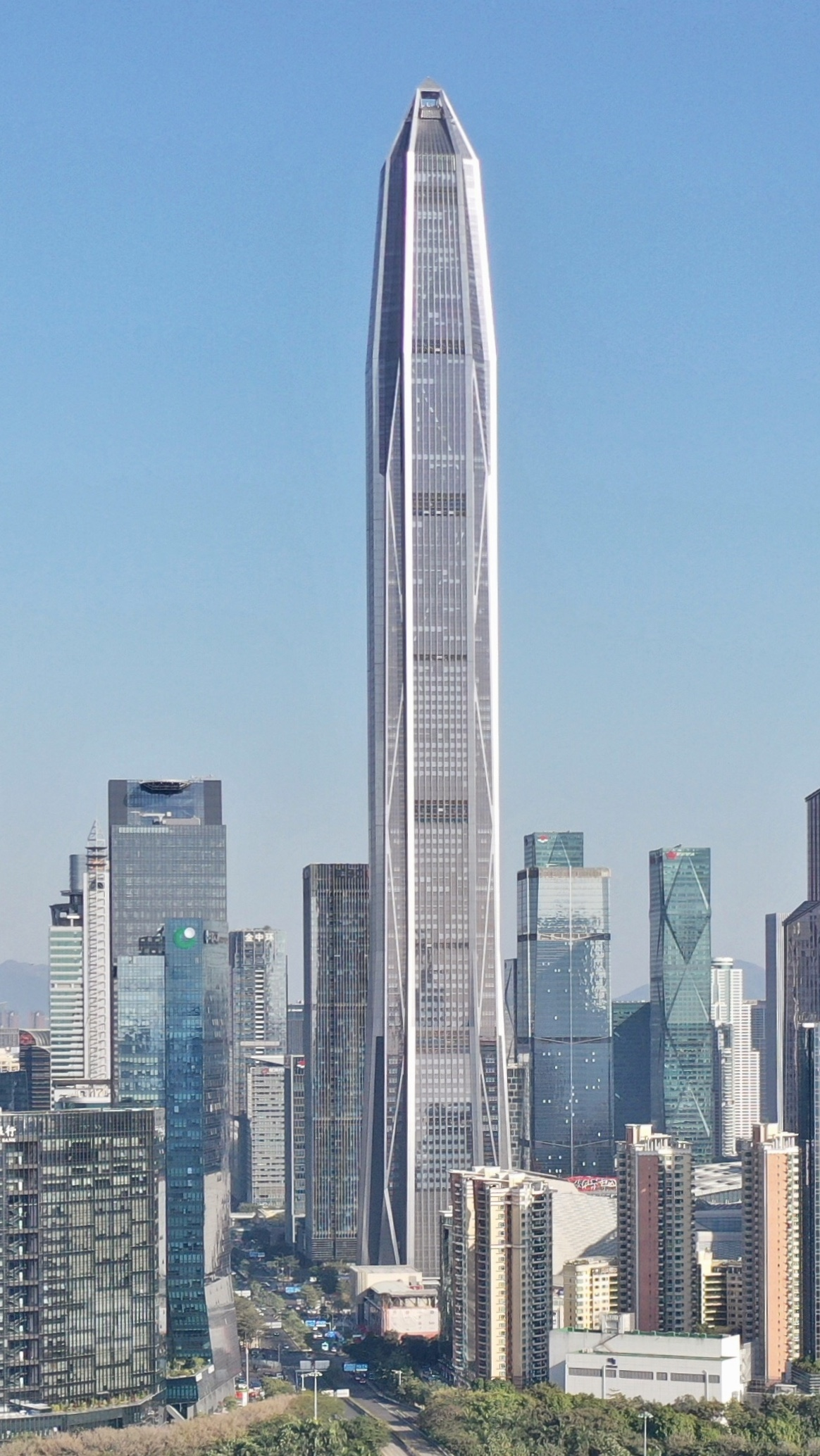
Ping An Finance Centre, the headquarters of Ping An Insurance

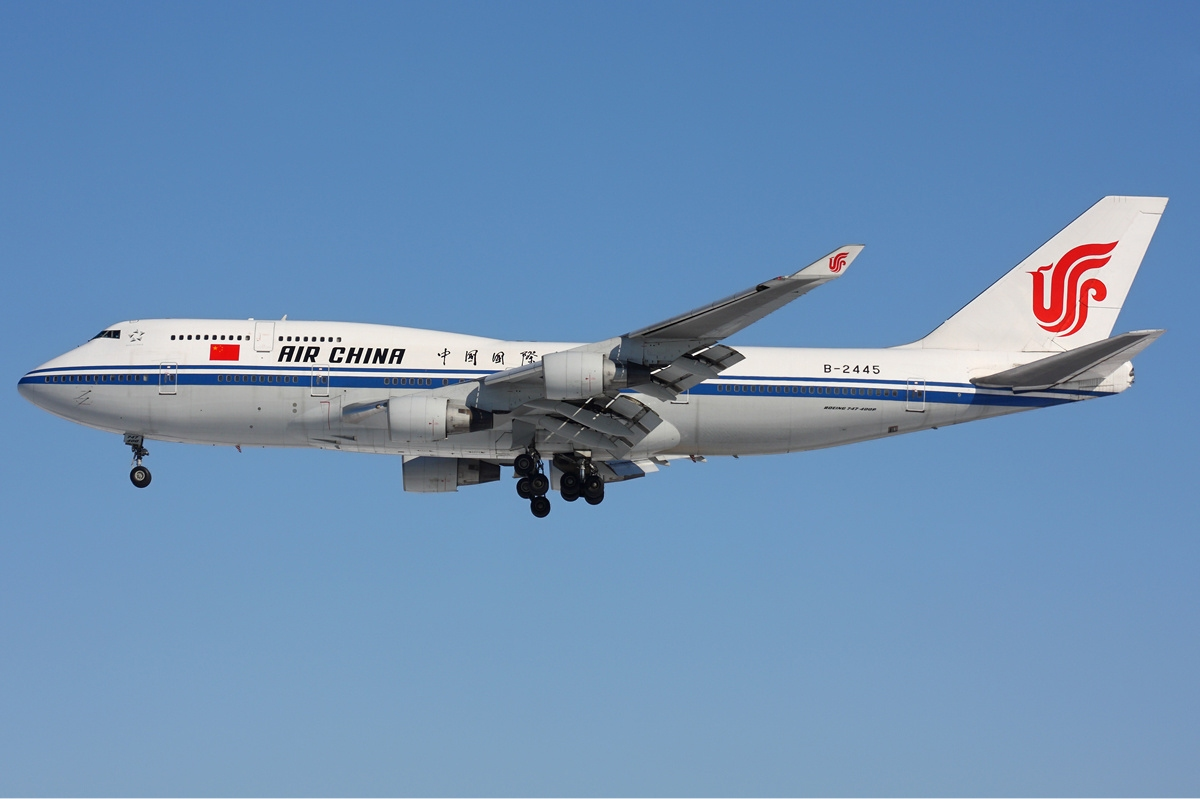
An Air China Boeing 747-400 plane.

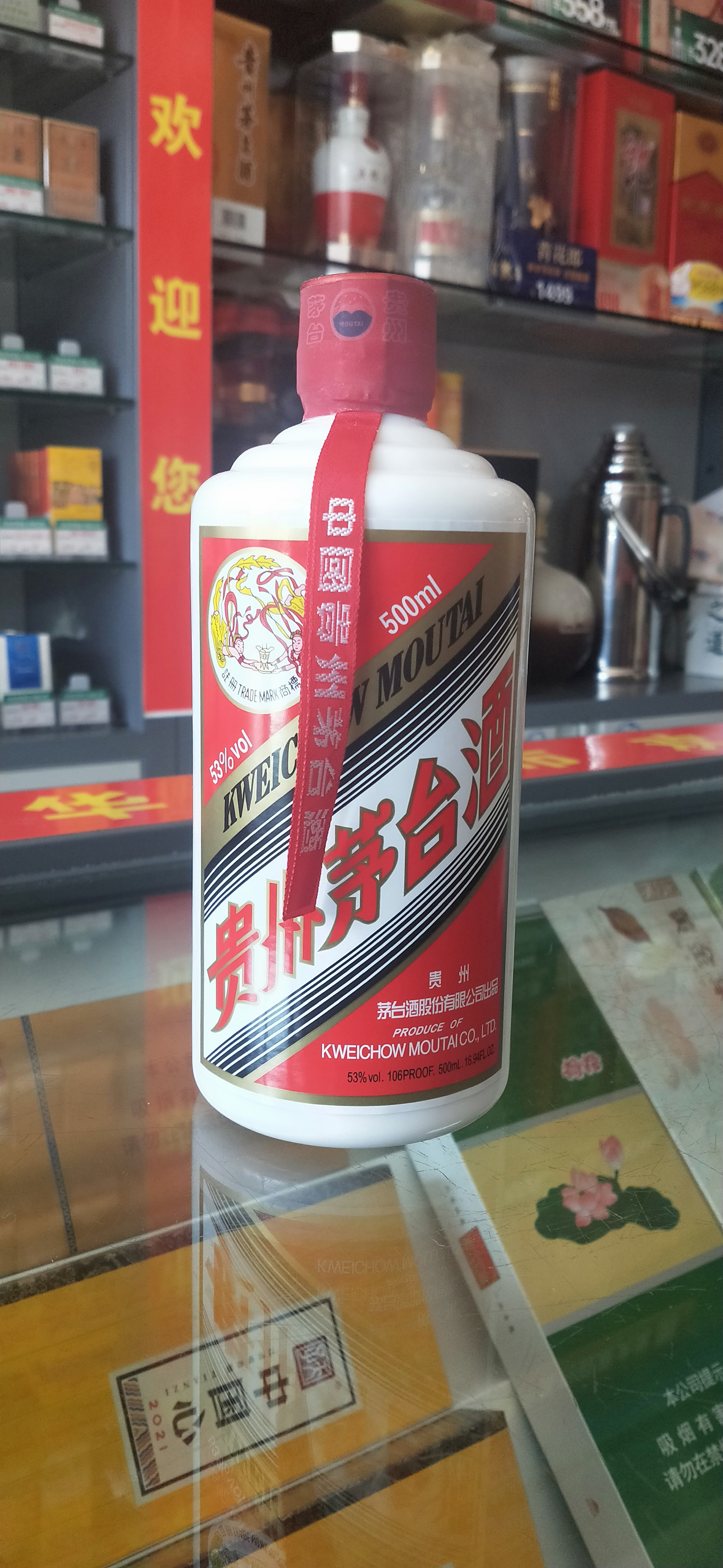
A bottle of alcohol produced by Kweichow Moutai

== See also ==
- List of public corporations by market capitalization
- List of telephone operating companies
- List of companies of Hong Kong
- List of companies of Macau
- List of largest Chinese companies
