= CHLN =

CHLN may refer to:

- CKOB-FM, a radio station licensed to Trois-Rivieres, Quebec, Canada, which formerly held the call sign CHLN-FM
- China Housing and Land Development Inc., NASDAQ symbol CHLN
