= GMY =

GMY may refer to:

- GMY Lighting Technology, a manufacturer in China
- Guaymaral Airport, in Colombia
- Goodmayes railway station, in London
- Mycenaean language
