= SPH =

SPH may refer to:

- School of Public Health (Imperial College London)
- Rutgers School of Public Health
- Sekolah Pelita Harapan, schools in Jakarta, Indonesia
- Shanghai Pharmaceuticals
- Shepherds Well railway station, Kent, England (National Rail station code SPH)
- Singapore Press Holdings
  - SPH Media
  - SPH MediaWorks
- Small penis humiliation
- Smoothed-particle hydrodynamics
- Sphingomyelin
- Self-propelled howitzer, a type of self-propelled artillery
