= SPH3127 =

Chemical compound

Legal status
- Legal status: Investigational

Identifiers
- IUPAC name: Methyl N-[3-[3-[(1R)-1-[cyclopropyl-[(2R)-morpholine-2-carbonyl]amino]ethyl]-6-methylpyrazolo[3,4-b]pyridin-1-yl]propyl]carbamate
- CAS Number: 1399849-02-5
- PubChem CID: 117877477
- ChemSpider: 76799450
- UNII: C2M78A9V6Z
- ChEMBL: ChEMBL4110551

Chemical and physical data
- Formula: C_{22}H_{32}N_{6}O_{4}
- Molar mass: 444.536 g·mol^{−1}
- 3D model (JSmol): Interactive image
- SMILES: CC1=NC2=C(C=C1)C(=NN2CCCNC(=O)OC)[C@@H](C)N(C3CC3)C(=O)[C@H]4CNCCO4
- InChI: InChI=1S/C22H32N6O4/c1-14-5-8-17-19(26-27(20(17)25-14)11-4-9-24-22(30)31-3)15(2)28(16-6-7-16)21(29)18-13-23-10-12-32-18/h5,8,15-16,18,23H,4,6-7,9-13H2,1-3H3,(H,24,30)/t15-,18-/m1/s1; Key:GRTDDIZIUSADLD-CRAIPNDOSA-N

SPH3127 is a small-molecule renin inhibitor developed by Shanghai Pharmaceuticals for hypertension and kidney disease. It is believed to be more potent than aliskiren.
