= DGW =

DGW may refer to:

- Converse County Airport, Wyoming, United States (IATA:DGW)
- Duoyuan Global Water, a Chinese water treatment equipment manufacturer (NYSE:DGW)

Dgw or dgw may refer to:

- Daungwurrung language, once spoken in Australia (ISO 639-3: dgw)
- Dienstgüterwagen (Dgw), a German railway wagon class

== See also ==
- Division for Girls' and Women's Sports (DGWS)
