= Bioenergy in China =

China has set the goal of attaining one percent of its renewable energy generation through bioenergy in 2020.

The development of bioenergy in China is needed to meet the rising energy demand.

Several institutions are involved in this development, most notably the Asian Development Bank and China's Ministry of Agriculture. There is also an added incentive to develop the bioenergy sector which is to increase the development of the rural agricultural sector.

As of 2005, bioenergy use has reached more than 20 million households in the rural areas, with methane gas as the main biofuel. Also more than 4000 bioenergy facilities produce 8 billion cubic metres every year of methane gas. By 2006, 20% of "gasoline" consumed was actually a 10% ethanol-gasoline blend. As of 2010, electricity generation by bioenergy was expected to reach 5 GW, and 30 GW by 2020. The annual use of methane gas was expected to be 19 cubic kilometers by 2010, and 40 cubic kilometers by 2020.

- China is the world's third-largest producer of ethanol, after Brazil and the United States.
- Although only 0.71% of the country's grain yield (3.366 million tons of grain) in 2006 was used for production of ethanol, concern has been expressed over potential conflicts between demands for food and fuel, as crop prices rose in late 2006.

As of at least 2023, China was both the world's largest producer and largest consumer of household biogas. As of 2023, more than 30 million rural Chinese households used biogas digesters.

== Events ==
- 10–12 October 2006, Beijing, China: Asia Biofuels Conference and Expo IV
- 24–27 October 2006, Beijing, China: Great Wall Renewable Energy Forum. Includes a technical conference and trade show.
- 7–9 November 2006, Beijing, China: Hart's 5th Annual World Refining and Fuels Conference: Asia, Hotel Kunlun

== Developments ==
- "Chinese Enterprise Wins Award for Energy Efficiency", 23 June 2007 from chinagate.com.cn. Daxu wins an Ashden Award for producing over 25,000 efficient stoves that can burn crop waste for cooking and hot water.
- "CASP agreement to benefit biofuel producers in Mekong", 11 April 2007 from Biofuelreview.com. Agriculture ministers from 6 countries, Cambodia, China, Laos, Myanmar, Thailand, and Vietnam have endorsed the Core Agricultural Support Program, which will work toward increasing trade and investment in agriculture in the Greater Mekong Subregion. A major focus will be helping farmers reap the benefits of new energy crops and related technologies.
- "Chinese Biofuels Expansion Threatens Ecological Balance", March 27, 2007 from Renewable Energy Access. A recent agreement between China's top forestry authority and one of the nation's biggest energy giants to develop biofuels plantations in the southwest may come at great environmental loss to the region's forests and biological diversity.
- "China plans to plant an area the size of England with biofuel trees", 8 February 2007 from China Daily. China will plant 130,000 square kilometres, an area the size of England, with jatropha trees to produce oil amounting to nearly 6 million tons of biodiesel every year. The jatropha trees can also provide wood fuel for a power plant with an installed capacity of 12 million kilowatts, will account for 30% of the country's renewable energy by 2010.
- "Ethanol fuels hopes of China's small farmers", 29 January 2007 from The Standard. Beijing's push to create more ethanol from cassava and sugar cane may benefit farmers in Guanxi, but with China already a net-importer of tapioca and sugar, it is not clear if there will be enough feedstocks to go around.
- "Biodiesel Sweeps China in Controversy", 23 January 2007 from Renewable Energy Access. China is looking at new biodiesel feedstocks including a new variety of rapeseed, Chinese pistachio and jatropha. However, standards and regulations are lacking and concerns over food vs fuel are growing.
- China has clamped down on the use of corn and other edible grains for producing biofuels due to concerns that it will impact on food security.
- China Clean Energy outlines plan to expand biodiesel capacity using palm oil leavings as a feedstock.
- China halts expansion of corn-based ethanol industry to arrest food price rise.
- Shaanxi Mothers wins an Ashden Award for the fitting of almost 1,300 biogas systems in farming households across China's Shaanxi Province.

== Policy ==
- The Renewable Energy Law of the People's Republic of China - English translation of the law, which took effect 1 January 2006

=== Targets ===
- Target of 10% renewable energy of the country's total energy consumption by 2010.
- Alternative fuels: 6 million tons by 2010 and 15 million tons by 2020.
- Target of 50% use of ethanol-blended gasoline by 2010.
- China has an annual production capacity of 1.02 million tons of ethanol.

== Issues ==
=== Biofuel production ===
- "Corn accounted for 76 percent of the 1.02 million tons of ethanol produced" in 2005.

=== Bioenergy potential ===
- "Non-grain crops in China could eventually produce as much as 300 million tonnes of ethanol a year, according to a report on the National Development and Reform Commission's website.

== Organizations ==
=== Regional organizations ===
- Core Agriculture Support Program - A program that includes southern China and the countries of the Mekong Subregion in South-East Asia, that provides support for biofuel feedstock and other agricultural programs.

=== Government organizations ===
- english.gov.net is the main English language portal for the Chinese Government. Many agencies do not yet have English language pages.

China's circulars on bioenergy policy have been co-released by the following agencies:

- National Development and Reform Commission - English overview of the NDRC, which is "a macro-economic regulatory department, with a mandate to develop national economic strategies". It deals with China's targets for biofuels.
  - NDRC (Chinese only)
- State Environmental Protection Agency (SEPA)
- Ministry of Finance - helps regulate subsidies and tax policy for bioenergy.
  - MOF (Chinese)
- Ministry of Agriculture (Chinese)
- State Forestry Administration (Chinese)
- State Administration of Taxation

==== Government websites (English) ====
- Cleaner Production in China with an overview of Chinese environmental law, policy and case studies relating to cleaner production and the circular economy
- China Climate Change Info-Net - information on laws, events, organizations and news dealing with climate change and renewable energy in China

=== Companies ===
- China National Petroleum Corporation
  - CNPC, through its subsidiary Jilin Fuel Ethanol Ltd. Co, built China's first ethanol plant using corn as a feedstock and now runs several other ethanol projects. Press Release: China's First fuel ethanol line into production in Jilin 27 November 2003.
- China National Cereals, Oils and Foodstuffs Corporation (Chinese only)
  - Plans to invest more than US$1 billion in ethanol projects to increase production capacity to 3 million tons
  - Currently owns an ethanol plant in Heilongjiang Province and has a 20 percent stake in another plant in Jilin Province, both using corn as a feedstock
  - The company is constructing an ethanol plant, which will use cassava as a feedstock, in the Guangxi Zhuang Autonomous Region.
  - Is awaiting government permission to build two 300,000-ton-per-year ethanol plants in Hebei Province, using corn and sweet potatoes, and Liaoning Province, using only sweet potatoes
- BBCA (mostly Chinese) - large scale ethanol and biomass producer, using corn and cassava. Also doing research into cellulosic ethanol.
- China Integrated Energy - a leading non-state-owned, integrated energy company in China engaged in three business segments: the wholesale distribution of finished oil and heavy oil products, the production and sale of biodiesel, and the operation of retail gas stations.

Publicly traded companies

At least two publicly traded companies, China Clean Energy, Inc. and Gushan, manufacture and sell significant amounts of biodiesel in China.

== Publications ==
- People's Republic of China Bio-Fuels: An Alternative Future for Agriculture 2006 - prepared by Kevin Latner, Caleb O'Kray, Junyang Jiang; USDA Foreign Agricultural Service, 8 August 2006.
- Environmental and Social Impact Analysis: Stora Enso Plantation project in Guangxi, China - UNDP, 5 February 2006. This analyzes the social and environmental impact of a large-scale forest plantation project by Stora Enso. Although this project is intended to supply pulp, its impacts are the same as if it were supplying bioenergy.
- Liquid Biofuels for Transportation: Chinese Potential and Implications for Sustainable Agriculture and Energy in the 21st Century (PDF file) - GTZ, 2005
- Health, Ecological, Energy And Economic Impacts Of Integrated Agricultural Bioenergy Systems In China And Institutional Strategies For Their Successful Diffusion (pdf) by John Byrne, Young-Doo Wang, William Ritter (supervisors); Center for Energy and Environment Policy, U. of Delaware, October 2004.

Other

- Biomass energy in China and its potential
- Rethinking China's bioenergy futur - Lin Gan - May 21, 2007

== See also ==
- Renewable energy in China
  - Solar power in China
  - Wind power in China
  - Geothermal power in China
  - Hydroelectricity in China
- Biofuels by region
- Food vs. fuel
- Renewable energy by country
