= Warrior (shoes) =

Chinese footwear brand

Warrior (回力)
- Industry: Shoes
- Founded: 1927; 99 years ago
- Headquarters: Shanghai, China
- Area served: Asia
- Products: Basketball Shoes, Ping Pong Shoes, Clubmans, Canvas Shoes, Tennis Shoes, Badminton Shoes
- Parent: Shanghai Huayi (Group) Company
- Website: www.warriorshoes.com

Warrior (Chinese: 回力; pinyin: Huílì; lit. 'back force') is a brand of athletic shoe from China, founded in Shanghai in 1927. From the 60s to the early 80s it became a nationwide shoemaker in China.

== Background ==
Founded in 1927, back then it was the first rubber shoes brand in China. The trademark Huili was created by Yuan Shusen and registered in 1934.

By the times of the Republic of China, Warrior was regarded as a high-end firm with innovative marketing campaigns. With a retail price of 10 yuan, at a time when urban workers made 30 yuan a month, it was considered a fashionable brand in the early days of the People's Republic of China.

In the mid 80s, foreign brands became more popular, and Warrior is often seen as a working class shoe, preferred by older people and with a price of 12 yuan at stallmarkets. Nowadays, various companies have started importing them to the west, and they are sold along with Feiyue shoes in fashionable areas of Chinese cities.

After that revival, a pair of Warrior shoes can go for about 100 yuan, as the company targets the product to customers who enjoy retro products. Its revenue grew from 200 million yuan in 2010, to 600 million in 2013, reaching the 700 next year.

Warrior is owned by Shanghai Huayi, a chemical company. There are also Warrior brand tires, made in a joint venture with Michelin.
