= Smith Street =

Smith Street may refer to:

- Smith Street, Darwin, Australia
- Smith Street, Melbourne, Australia
- Smith Street Motorway, Gold Coast, Queensland, Australia
- Smith Street, Singapore
- Smith Street, a main shopping street in South Brooklyn, United States
- "Smith Street", a 2022 song by Birds of Tokyo

== See also ==
- SmithStreetSolutions, a Shanghai-based consulting firm
- The Smith Street Band, an Australian rock named after the Melbourne street
