= ZGC =

ZGC may refer to:

== Transportation ==
- ZGC, a type of dual-voltage electric multiple unit trainset (Z 27500)

== Technology ==
- Z Garbage Collector, a garbage collector in Java Virtual Machine

== Other uses ==
- Lanzhou Zhongchuan International Airport, China, by IATA airport code
- ZGC Motors, a Chinese manufacturing company
