= Telesail Technology =

Chinese telecommunications manufacturing company

Telesail Technology Company, Limited, is a telecommunications equipment and systems company headquartered in Beijing, China, founded in 2005. The company provides Internet access, unified communications products and services.

Telesail core products include IP PBX, VoIP Access Gateway, Trunking gateway, VoIP phone, also including EPON optical line termination, EPON optical network units, planar lightwave circuit splitters and optical transceivers.

Telesail's customers are primarily Internet service providers and VoIP service operators. It is also an original equipment manufacturer that manufactures products which retail under other brand names.

== See also ==
- FTTx
- Ethernet in the first mile (EFM)
- Passive optical network
- Fiber-optic communication
