= China Dongxiang =

Chinese sportswear company

China Dongxiang (Group) Co. Ltd. 中国动向（集团）有限公司
- Type: Public
- Industry: Sports equipment
- Founded: 2006; 20 years ago
- Headquarters: Beijing, China
- Area served: China and Japan
- Key people: Chen Yihong (Chairman)
- Products: Apparel, Footwear
- Website: www.dxsports.com

China Dongxiang (Group) Company Limited (SEHK: 3818) is a Chinese company listed on the main board of the Hong Kong Stock Exchange. It is engaged in the design and sales of sports apparel and footwear in Asia. It owns all the rights to Kappa products in China, while Phenix products are marketed in Japan.

== History ==
In April 2008, China Dongxiang announced the acquisition of Phenix Co., Ltd. ("Phenix"), which mainly owned and managed Kappa and Phenix brands in Japan. As a result, the group expanded its regional brand portfolio extending product types to help develop the China ski and outdoor fashion markets.

== Mission ==
The company aims to further enhance its current R&D techniques and ability to integrate Japan Phenix's design and R&D capacity as well as relevant talents.

== See also ==
- Warrior (shoes)
