= Gushan Environmental Energy =

Chinese biodiesel producer

Gushan Environmental Energy Limited
- Type: Private
- Industry: Energy
- Founded: 2001
- Headquarters: Fuzhou, People's Republic of China
- Key people: Yu Jianqiu, CEO
- Products: Biodiesel
- Revenue: approx. $140 million USD (2007)
- Net income: approx. $32 million USD (2007)
- Number of employees: approx. 350 (2008)
- Website: http://www.chinagushan.com/

Gushan Environmental Energy Limited (simplified Chinese: 古杉集团; traditional Chinese: 古杉集團; pinyin: Gǔshān Jítuán) is a biodiesel producer in China that was incorporated on May 16, 2006. The Company produces biodiesel and by-products of biodiesel production, including glycerol, plant asphalt, erucic acid and erucic amide. Biodiesel is a renewable, clean-burning and biodegradable fuel produced from a variety of feedstocks, such as vegetable oil, animal fat and recycled cooking oil. Currently there are 5 production facilities located in Beijing, Shanghai, Mianyang in Sichuan province, Handan in Hebei province and Fuzhou in Fujian province, serving the northern, interior and southeastern regions of China respectively. Biodiesel is used to fuel a range of diesel engines, typically after blending with diesel, including diesel engines found in trucks, mass transit vehicles, marine vessels and generators. The by-products of its biodiesel production have commercial applications in the food, pharmaceutical and manufacturing industries. The Company sells its products in China to direct users, including marine vessel operators, petroleum wholesalers and individual retail gas stations. The Company primarily uses vegetable oil offal and used cooking oil to produce biodiesel. It acquires the raw materials supply for each of its production facilities primarily from local suppliers.

The company's biodiesel production process generates biodiesel and the by-products of biodiesel production, such as glycerine, a distillation residue of biodiesel production known as plant asphalt, erucic acid and erucic amide, which has commercial applications. Its products include biodiesel, which is a renewable, clean-burning and biodegradable alternative to diesel that can be used to power a range of diesel vehicles, including trucks, mass transit vehicles and marine vessels; glycerine and refined glycerine, which is a colorless, odorless, nontoxic liquid with uses, including use in foods and beverages, as a preservative, sweetener or softening agent, in pharmaceuticals, as a lubricant, alcohol substitute or expectorant, as a paint dissolving solvent, and in personal care products, in soap, shampoo and lotion; plant asphalt, as fuel for boilers, casting plaster and a stain remover; erucic acid, which is a fatty acid that can be extracted from rapeseed and used in the production of lubricants and polyesters, in skin and health care products, plastic photographic film manufacturing processes and as a transmission fluid additive; erucic amide, which is an anti-felt, anti-static agent for fabrics and a plastics lubricant; stearic acid, which is a fatty acid used in making plastics, soaps, cosmetics and candles.

The Company competes with China Biodiesel International Holdings, East River Energy Resources, Sinopec, Cnooc and PetroChina.

== Corporate governance ==
The board of directors is composed of 5 directors 3 of whom are independent directors. As of 2009 they include Jianqiu Yu the principal executive officer, Deyu Chen, Kang Nam Chu, Dongming Zhang, and Denny Lee.

== Production capacity ==
=== Biodiesel ===
The company's aggregate annual biodiesel production capacity increased from 40,000 tons, during the year ended December 31, 2004 to 70,000 tons, 170,000 tons and 190,000 tons as of December 31, 2005 and 2006 and November 1, 2007, respectively. It produced and sold 158,994 tons of biodiesel during the year ended December 31, 2006, and 136,587 tons of biodiesel as of September 30, 2007.

=== Future production capacity ===
Gushan has stated that they are targeted to increase their annual biodiesel production capacity to 400,000 tons by the end of 2008. This prediction is in part due to two new production facilities whose construction will be completed in Hunan and Chongqing and expanding capacity at their Beijing plant.

== History ==
- In 2001, Sichuan Gushan (Sichuan Gushan Vegetable Fat Chemistry Co., Ltd.) was established in Mianyang, Sichuan and began production of biodiesel with a manufacturing capacity of 10,000 tons.
- In 2003, Handan Gushan (Handan Gushan Bio-sources Energy Co. Ltd.) was established in Hebei and began to build a production line with biodiesel capacity of 30,000 tons per year which commenced production in 2004.
- In 2004, the company obtained ISO9001: 2000 international quality control certification.
- In 2004, a 30,000 ton biodiesel production line was added at the Sichuan facility, increasing capacity to 40,000 tons per annum
- In 2005, Fujian Gushan (Fujian Gushan Bio-diesel Energy Co., Ltd.) was established in Mawei, Fuzhou, Fujian Province and the company then began building a facility with biodiesel production capacity of 100,000 tons per year which commenced production in 2006.
- In 2006, Shanghai Gushan (Shanghai Gushan Bio-sources Energy Technologies Co., Ltd.) and Beijing Gushan (Beijing Gushan Bio-sources Energy Co. Ltd.) in Beijing were established.
- In 2007, a 20,000 ton biodiesel production line was added at the Sichuan facility, increasing to 60,000 tons per annum.
- On December 19, 2007, an initial public offering of 18,000,000 American Depositary Shares (ADSs) began trading on the New York Stock Exchange under the symbol "GU".
- On January 24, 2008, a 50,000 ton biodiesel production was added at the new opened Beijing plant, increasing capacity to 240,000 tons per annum.
- On February 19, 2008, the company announced that it has, through its newly established subsidiaries, Chongqing Gushan Bio-Sources Energy Co., Ltd and Hunan Gushan Bio-Sources Energy Co., Ltd, entered into agreements for the acquisition of land use rights to areas in Chongqing and Hunan, respectively, for the construction of biodiesel facilities in order to expand its production capacity.
- On October 17, 2012, the company announced the completion of privatization of the stock("GU") and suspension of its ADSs trading on the New York Stock Exchange ("NYSE").

== See also ==
- China Clean Energy
