= Zhongjin Lingnan =

Chinese non-ferrous metals mining and smelting company

Zhongjin Lingnan Nonfemet 中金岭南有色金属股份有限公司
- Type: Public
- Traded as: SZSE: 000060
- Industry: Non-ferrous metals
- Founded: 1984
- Headquarters: Shenzhen, China
- Key people: Ma Jianhua (Interim Chairman), Wu Shenghui (Executive Director & Party Secretary), Yu Gang (President)
- Products: Zinc, lead, copper, silver, nickel; minor real-estate operations
- Revenue: ¥26.87 billion (2023)
- Operating income: ¥1.31 billion (2023)
- Net income: ¥597 million (2023)
- Total assets: ¥35.42 billion (2023)
- Total equity: ¥15.77 billion (2023)
- Owner: Guangdong Rising Assets Management ≈ 36 %, China Securities Finance ≈ 3 %, National Social Security Fund ≈ 2 %
- Website: www.nonfemet.com

Zhongjin Lingnan Nonfemet Company Limited (Chinese: 中金岭南有色金属股份有限公司) is a Chinese mining and metallurgy group headquartered in Shenzhen, Guangdong. It carries out integrated mining, beneficiation, smelting and trading of non-ferrous metals—chiefly zinc and lead—with by-products such as copper, silver, indium and sulfuric acid.

Its A-shares have traded on the Shenzhen Stock Exchange since 23 January 1997 under ticker SZSE: 000060.

== History ==
Zhongjin Lingnan was founded in 1984 during China's non-ferrous sector restructuring and initially operated under the China National Non-ferrous Metals Industry Corp. After that corporation's dissolution in 1998, control passed to the Guangdong provincial government via its investment arm, Guangdong Rising Assets Management (GRAM), which remains the majority shareholder.

=== Overseas expansion ===
- Australia – In February 2009 Australia approved Zhongjin Lingnan's purchase of a 50.1 % stake in Perilya Limited, owner of the historic Broken Hill lead-zinc-silver mine. Zhongjin acquired the remaining shares in December 2013, gaining full ownership.
- Canada – Guangdong government reports list Zhongjin Lingnan among provincial mining firms entering Canadian exploration joint ventures in 2013.

=== Industry coordination ===
In November 2015 Zhongjin Lingnan joined nine other major Chinese zinc smelters in pledging to cut refined-zinc output by 500,000 t in 2016.

== Operations ==
- Mining and smelting – Core assets include the Shaoguan lead-zinc smelter in Guangdong and, via Perilya, the Broken Hill South and Potosi mines in New South Wales.
- International assets – Perilya also controls base-metal mines in the Dominican Republic and holds earlier-stage zinc-lead projects in Canada.
- Real-estate and logistics – The group retains small property-development and logistics businesses inherited from earlier diversification.

In 2023 the company's mines produced about 1.05 million t of zinc-lead concentrate, while its smelters produced roughly 92,000 t of refined zinc.
