= Cheers Wines =

Chinese wine import company

CHEERS Wines
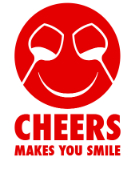
- Industry: Hospitality
- Founded: 2011
- Founder: Claudia Masueger
- Headquarters: 12-153 Jianguomenwai Diplomatic Residence Compound No1 XiushuiJie, Chaoyang District, China
- Number of locations: 39 (2016)
- Area served: China
- Website: www.cheers-wines.com

Cheers Wines is a Chinese wine import company headquartered in Beijing with partner stores throughout China. It is a WSET APP (Wine, Spirit and Educational trust Approved Program Provider). The company's slogan is Cheers makes you smile.

Cheers Wines has been featured in various online magazines and news websites such as China Daily, Thatsmags.com, PwC CEO Magazine, The Beijinger, Harper's Bazaar, City Weekend and The Business Cuisine.

== History ==
Claudia Masueger immigrated to China in 2008 and founded a business-to-business wholesale wine company called MQ Wines. The Masueger family, originally from Switzerland, has been in the wine business since 1898. Masueger founded Cheers Wines in 2011 after the MQ Wines warehouse burned down. Cheers Wines grew from 4 stores in 2011 to 39 stores in 2016 after investment from the Swiss company Moevenpick.

In 2016, Cheers Wine opened at the Topwin Centre, in the heart of Sanlitun, in Beijing. The company received the "Most Potential Franchise Star in 2016" award from Entrepreneur's 500.

== Awards ==
- The Beijinger Bar & Club Awards: Best For Wine 2015 & 2016
- Beijing Expat Life Awards: The Best Wine Shop 2015 & The Best Wine Bar 2016
- China Wine & Spirits Awards 2015: CHEERS wine master Angqian Niu is always invited to be part of the jury to select the best wines
- Entrepreneur's Franchise 500® (Entrepreneur China): The Most Potential Franchise Star In 2016
- Wines of Germany - 2016德国葡萄酒年会暨颁奖晚宴圆满落幕: 2016 Best Retailer
