= Qinghai Huading Industrial =

Chinese holding company

Qinghai Huading Industrial Co., Ltd.
- Type: public
- Traded as: SSE: 600243
- Industry: Conglomerate
- Founded: 1998
- Headquarters: Xining, China
- Key people: Shiguang Yu, Chairman of the Board
- Products: Machine tools, Food machinery, Elevator components, Gearboxes, LED lighting, Healthcare, Restaurant
- Number of employees: 4,000 (2013)
- Website: www.qhhdsy.com

Qinghai Huading Industrial Co., Ltd.
- Simplified Chinese: 青海华鼎实业股份有限公司
- Traditional Chinese: 青海華鼎實業股份有限公司
Transcriptions

Qinghai Huading
- Simplified Chinese: 青海华鼎
- Traditional Chinese: 青海華鼎
Transcriptions

Qinghai Huading Industrial Co., Ltd. known as Qinghai Huading or just QHHD, is a holding company established in 1998 and listed on the Shanghai Stock Exchange in 2000. As of 12 June 2015, the company has a market capitalization of 4.682 billion CNY and employs over 4,000 staff. Through its various subsidiaries, the company is involved mainly in the manufacturing and distribution of machine tools, gearboxes, food machineries, elevator components and LED lightings.

== Operations ==
The group's core business is the manufacturing of machine tools. As of 2012, Qinghai Huading is the domestic market leader in horizontal machine tools in terms of output volume and has over 90% domestic market share in rail road specific machine tools.

== Subsidiaries and Affiliates ==
- Qinghai Huading Heavy Machine Tools Company Limited. (青海华鼎重型机床有限责任公司)
- QInghai Maoyuan Trading Company Limited. (青海茂源贸易有限责任公司)
- Qinghai One Machine Numerical Control Machine Tool Company Limited. (青海一机数控机床有限责任公司)
- Jiangyuan Precision Machinery Company Limited. (苏州江源精密机械有限公司)
- Guangdong Jingchuang Machinery Manufacturing Company Limited. (广东精创机械制造有限责任公司)
- Guangzhou Hongli Machine Tools Company Limited. (广州宏力数控有限责任公司)
- Guangdong Henglian Food Machinery Company Limited. (广东恒联食品机械有限责任公司)
- Guangdong Zhonglong Communications Technology Limited. (广东中龙交通科技有限公司)

== Directors & Officers ==
- Shiguang Yu - Chairman of the Board
- Shanpeng Xiao - Chief Financial Officer
- Yongjun Yang - General Manager, Director
- Fubin Liu - Deputy General Manager
- Dong Zhai - Deputy General Manager
- Wenzhong Liu - Secretary of the Board, Deputy General Manager, Director
- Yuenan Li - Staff Elected Director
- Baoshan Ding - Independent Director
- Yuanju Ma - Independent Director
- Jianjun Wang - Independent Director
- Yong Xu - Independent Director
- Xuetong Yang - Independent Director

Officers and Directors data as of February 17, 2013
