= Eisoo =

Chinese cloud computing company

EISOO Information Technology Corp.
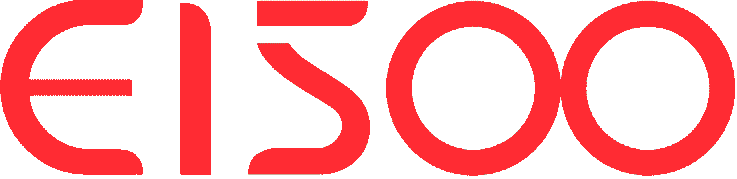
- Native name: 上海爱数信息技术股份有限公司
- Type: Cloud computing
- Industry: Cloud, Disaster Recovery, File Sync & Sharing
- Founded: Shanghai (2006)
- Headquarters: Shanghai, China
- Key people: Frank He, CEO
- Products: EISOO AI, AnyShare, AnyBackup, AnyRobot EISOO Managed Cloud Service
- Website: https://global.eisoo.com/ https://ai.eisoo.cloud/

EISOO Information Technology Corp. is a Chinese cloud computing company that offers synchronization, sharing, data protection (backup, disaster recovery, and virtualization management) and manages cloud services. EISOO was founded in 2006 and is headquartered in Shanghai, China.

Until 2016, EISOO mainly promoted three product lines: AnyShare, AnyBackup, and EISOO Managed Cloud Service (EMCS).

In 2017, Eisoo added another service called EISOO AI, a trading platform based on artificial intelligence.

== History ==
- 2006.04 EISOO Software Co., Ltd. was founded by Frank He
- 2007.04 EISOO cooperated with BitDefender Ltd. Provided a full backup utility for BitDefender Total Security 2008
- 2008.01 EISOO released AnyBackup appliance in China 2.1
- 2008.07 EISOO's backup software – SuperBackup, was chosen by Microsoft(China), to be included in Microsoft "Happy Package"
- 2008.08 EISOO provided disaster recovery solution for IBM servers: IBM System x3610, IBM System x3100
- 2009.07 EISOO works with Dell to build Dell PowerBackup Solution
- 2009.11 Dell, Inc. signed an agreement with EISOO Technology to start their strategic partnership. The partners launched their joint data backup products to provide data protection service for small and medium business
- 2011 EISOO published a secure document management appliance
- 2014 EISOO released the first private file cloud in China – AnyShare 3.5
- 2015 EISOO promoted the Intelligent Data Management Solutions under the CAM trend
- 2015 EISOO changed its name from EISOO Software Co. Ltd to EISOO Information Technology Corp. and started to transform its business to cloud computing.
- 2017 EISOO released AnyRobot Log Management and Analytics for Enterprise
- 2017 EISOO released international trading service EISOO AI powered by AnyRobot
- 2018 EISOO released EISOO AI with AnyRobot 2.0 and started an international promotion with a budget of $1 000 000
