= Trands =

Chinese clothing brand

Daliang Dayang Trands Co Ltd. 大连大杨创世股份有限公司
- Type: Public
- Traded as: SSE: 600233
- Industry: Textiles - Apparel Clothing
- Founded: 1995
- Headquarters: Dalian, Liaoning, China
- Key people: Li Guilian, Founder
- Number of employees: 6,224
- Website: Trands China; Trands USA

Trands is a Chinese clothing brand under the clothing maker Dayang Group, headquartered in Dalian, Liaoning. Trands' market is currently domestic and they target the mid-to-high end menswear market in China. The brand was launched in 1995.

Trands USA is also a North America operated company that is owned by the Dayang Group and is based in Los Angeles. The company designs, produces, markets, distributes and wholesales men's custom made to measure suits, sport coats, shirts and overcoats under the Trands label as well as a private label.

Trands is known for being worn by billionaires Warren Buffett, Bill Gates, Charlie Munger and the former CPC General Secretary Hu Jintao.

In a video released by the company on 29 August 2009, Buffett praised the brand, saying he had thrown away all his other suits (including suits from Ermenegildo Zegna) and only wears Trands. Buffett now had 9 Trands suits and a tuxedo. In the days following the Buffett video, Trands stock climbed over 200%.
