= Shanghai Huayi (Group) Company =

Chinese chemical company

Shanghai Huayi (Group) Company (Chinese: 上海华谊（集团）公司) is a Chinese chemistry enterprise group. There are more than 20 wholly or partially owned subsidiaries in coal power, plastics, rubber products and other areas of chemical industry. The group has nearly 40,000 employees.

Shanghai Huayi have joint ventures with the international companies DuPont, BASF, Bayer, Michelin, Cabot and Arkema.

== Subsidiaries ==
- Double Coin Holdings LTD
- Shanghai Tianyuan (Group) Co., Ltd
- Shanghai Coking & Chemical Co., Ltd.
- Shanghai Chlor-Alkali Chemical Co., Ltd.
- Shanghai Wujing Chemical Co., Ltd.
