= Double Coin =

Chinese tire manufacturer

Double Coin logotype. It shows two Ancient Chinese coins with the characteristic square holes in the middle.

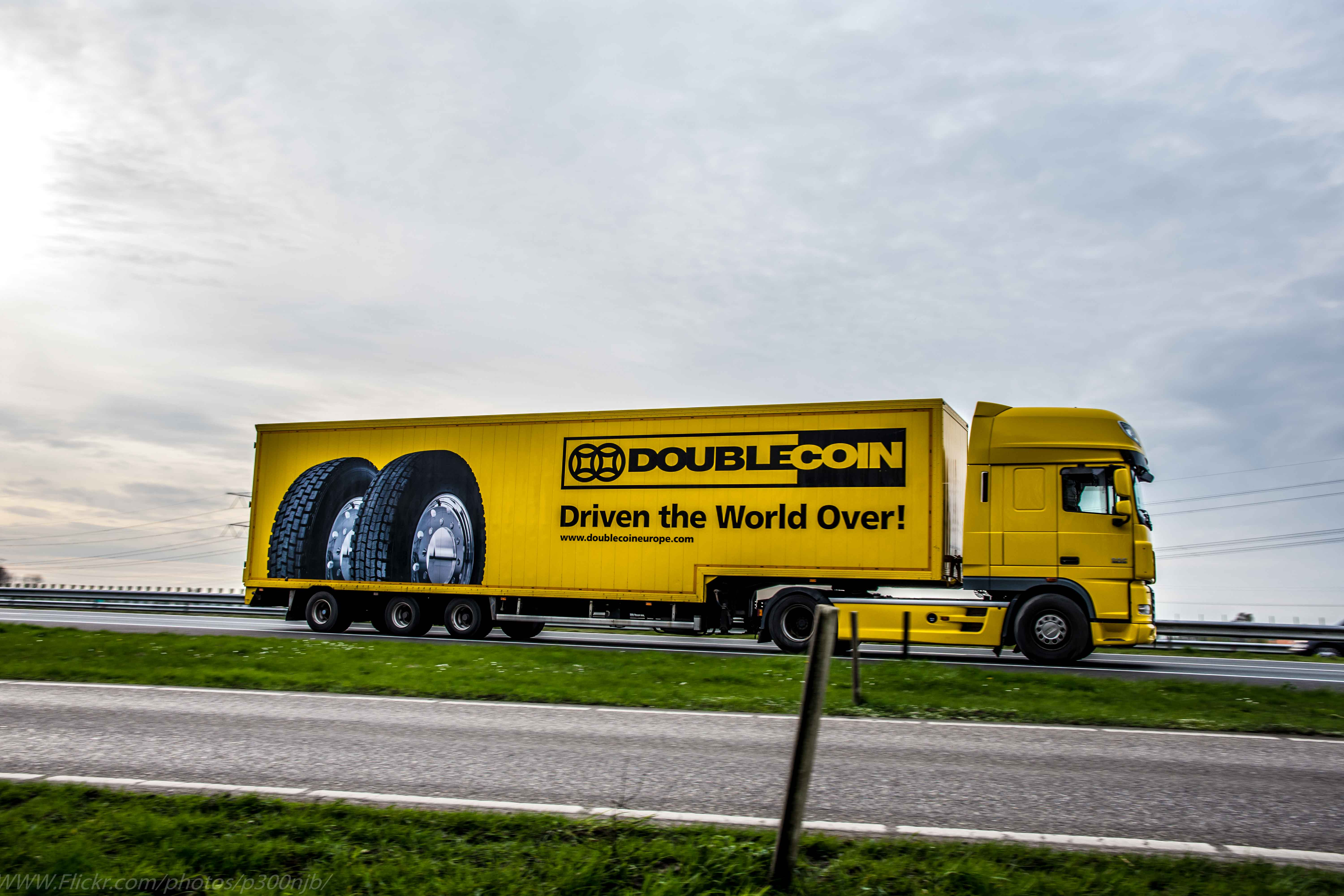
Double Coin truck in Holland.

Double Coin (Chinese: 双钱) is a Chinese manufacturer of radial tires for trucks. It is headquartered in Shanghai and is majority owned by Shanghai Huayi. Double Coin also makes Warrior brand car and light truck tires in a joint venture with Michelin. The North American subsidiary is China Manufacturers Alliance, LLC (CMA).
