= Vsun =

Chinese smartphone company

Vsun Mobile
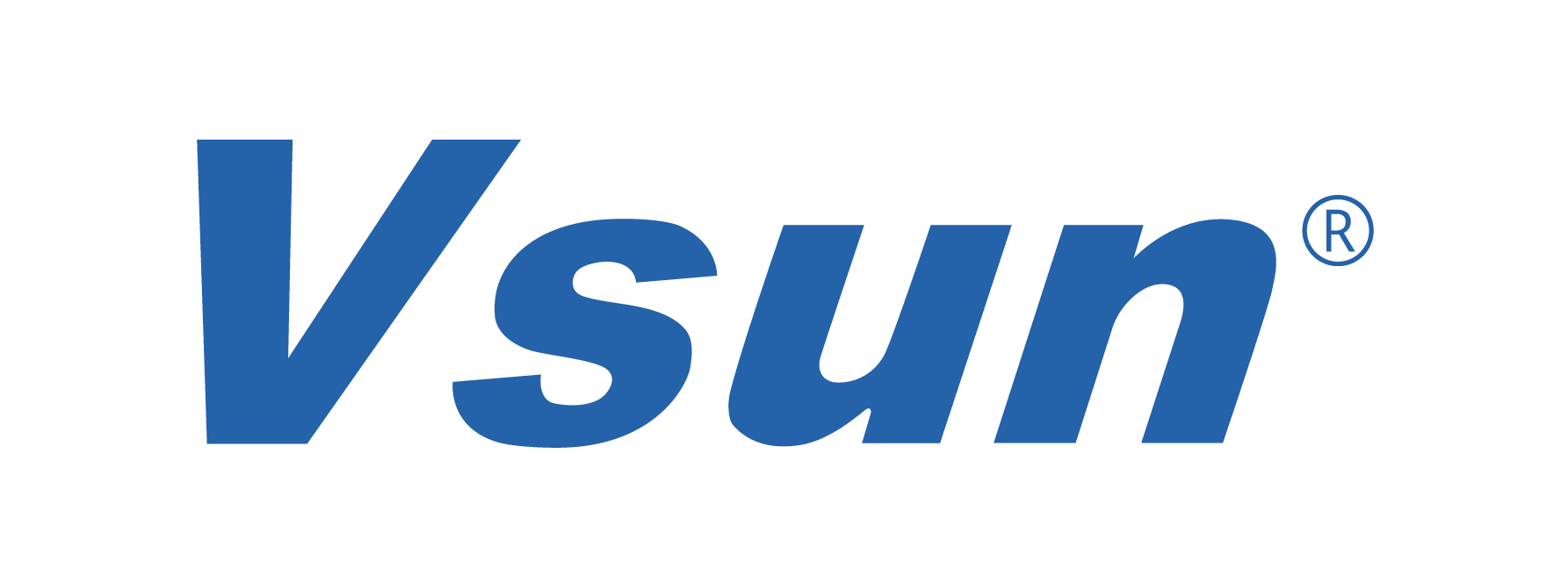
- Native name: 深圳市闻尚通讯科技有限公司
- Company type: Private
- Industry: Telecommunications
- Founded: 2013 (globally registered); 17 May 2011 (company founded)
- Founder: Zhang Xueying
- Defunct: Declared bankruptcy 19 May 2019
- Headquarters: Shenzhen, Guangdong, China
- Area served: Worldwide
- Key people: Zhang Xueying (Chairman and President); Haitham kalakesh (CEO)
- Products: Smartphones, Mobile Phones, tablets and phone accessories
- Number of employees: 600 (2015)
- Divisions: Dubai, UAE
- Website: Vsun Mobile; Vsun Online

Vsun 闻尚
- Simplified Chinese: 深圳市闻尚通讯科技有限公司
- Traditional Chinese: 深圳市聞尚通訊科技有限公司
- Literal meaning: Shenzhen Vsun Communication Technology Co,. Ltd
Transcriptions
Standard Mandarin
- Hanyu Pinyin: Shēnzhèn Shì Wénshàng Tōngxùn Kējì Yǒuxiàn Gōngsī

Vsun (Chinese: 闻尚; pinyin: Wén Shàng) was a Chinese smartphone manufacturer. It was based in Shenzhen, Guangdong. It was originally founded on 17 May 2011 as Shenzhen Vsun Communication Technology Co., Ltd (Chinese: 深圳市闻尚通讯科技有限公司). This company was officially declared bankruptcy on 19 May 2019.

== History ==
Vsun has been designing, producing and selling mobile phones for over a decade. It has a presence in the Middle East, Africa, Turkey and CIS countries.

On 19 May 2019, Vsun announced they would declared bankruptcy and laid off its all employees the same day.

== Distribution ==
The distribution partners and retailers are from Saudi Arabia, Bahrain, Qatar, Kuwait, Oman, Egypt, Turkey, Afghanistan, Jordan, Kenya, Nigeria, and several other countries.

== Profile ==
The company hired Haitham kalakesh as CEO and has opened up a large regional head office in Business Bay, Dubai, UAE in 2015 in the name of Vsun Electronics Trading L.L.C, and a North Africa hub office in Cairo, Egypt The company, which has its main head office in Shenzhen, Guangdong, China, has a software design house, R&D facilities and multiple manufacturing facilities. The company in Dubai is called Vsun Mobility.

The company also set up its first Indian assembly unit in Bawal, Haryana, India. It has more than 40 assembly lines itself in the 10 acres of land area with having the capacity to produce more than 40 million devices each year.

== Products ==
The company entered the mobile phone market in 2011. The company launches their products first in UAE and then distributes worldwide. Vsun company has large number of warehouses in Al Quoz area which is located in Dubai, UAE. Distributions are done from these warehouses to other locations with several countries by air, ship and land cargo.

=== 2016 ===
	Illusion	RACE	V Touch	VTab 3G (Tablet)	VTab 3G+ (Tablet)	Cube+	Vsun NOTE
Dimensions	161.3 x 84.9 x 8.6 mm	145 x 72 x 8.3 mm	145.8 x 71.8 x 8.7 mm	189 x 108 x 9.2 mm	189 x 108 x 9.2 mm	132 x 68 x 9 mm	151 x 77 x 8 mm
Weight	182 g	142 g	147 g	258 g	258 g	125 g	171 g
Display	6" HD IPS	5" HD IPS with 300dpi	5" HD IPS Retina Display	7" HD IPS Display	7" LCD twisted nematic Display	4.5" FWVGA Display	5" HD IPS Display
Resolution	720x1280 pixels	720x1280 pixels	720x1280 pixels	720x1280 pixels	1024x600 pixels	854x480 pixels	720x1280 pixels
Internal storage	2 GB	2 GB	2 GB	512 MB	1 GB	1 GB	1 GB
Memory	16 GB	16 GB	16 GB	8 GB	8 GB	8 GB	8 GB
Rear Camera	13 MP	13 MP	13 MP	3.2 MP	3.2 MP	5 MP	8 MP
Front Camera	5 MP	5 MP	5 MP	0.3 MP	0.3 MP	2 MP	3.2 MP
Battery	Li-Ion 3300 mAh	Li-ion 2250 mAh	Li-ion 2300 mAh	Li-ion 2800 mAh	Li-ion 2800 mAh	Li-ion 1800 mAh	Li-ion 3000 mAh
Processor	Quad Core 1.3 GHz	Quad Core 1.3 GHz	Quad Core 1.3 GHz	Quad Core 1.5 GHz	Quad Core 1.5 GHz	Quad Core 1.5 GHz	Quad Core 1.3 GHz
OS	5.1.0 Lollypop	5.1.0 Lollypop	5.1.0 Lollypop	5.1.0 Lollypop	5.1.0 Lollypop	6.0.1 Marshmallow	6.0.1 Marshmallow
Release date	March 2016	March 2016	April 2016	May 2016	June 2016	Aug 2016	August 2016
Extra Features	A Big Theater like Screen for Bigger VR 360 view	First phone with VR enable	First Smartphone with Finger Printer Sensor	Support Many Pictures, Videos, Music formats, 3D Games	Same as VTab 3G	TBD	TBD

=== 2015 ===
	Spark	Sky	Aqua	Alpha+	Alpha	Cube	Smart	Solo	Capture	NOCAM	DNA	H9 Furious
Dimensions	118 x 63 x 11.2 mm	145 × 73 × 8.9 mm	145 × 72 × 10.1 mm	123 × 64.5 × 9.5 mm	116 × 62.8 × 10.2 mm	132 × 68 × 9 mm	145.3 × 73.38 × 9 mm	146 × 72 × 9 mm	144.8 × 72.8 × 8.8 mm	145.3 × 73.38 × 9 mm	146 × 70 × 10 mm	154 × 76.8 × 7.2 mm
Weight	140 g	142 g	146.3 g	115 g	150 g	141 g	158 g	168 g	170 g	142 g	161 g	149 g
Display	3.5" HVGA	5" HD	5" FWVGA	4" FWVGA	3.5" HVGA	4.5" FWVGA	5" FWVGA	5" FWVGA	5" HD	5" HD	5" HD	5.5" FHD
Resolution	480x320 pixels	720x1280 pixels	480x854 pixels	480x800 pixels	480x320 pixels	854x480 pixels	854x480 pixels	854x480 pixels	1280x720 pixels	1280x720 pixels	1920x1080 pixels	1920x1080 pixels
Internal Storage	512 MB	2 GB	1 GB	512 MB	256 MB	512 MB	1 GB	1 GB	1 GB	1 GB	2 GB	2 GB
Memory	4 GB	16 GB	8 GB	4 GB	512 MB	4 GB	8 GB	8 GB	8 GB	8 GB	16 GB	16 GB
Rear Camera	0.3 MP	13 MP	5 MP	5 MP	2 MP	5 MP	8 MP	8 MP	8 MP	NA	13 MP	13 MP
Front Camera	0.3 MP	5 MP	2 MP	2 MP	0.3 MP	2 MP	2 MP	2 MP	5 MP	NA	5 MP	5 MP
Battery	Li-Ion 1300 mAh	Li-Ion 2200 mAh	Li-Ion 2100 mAh	Li-Ion 1300 mAh	Li-Ion 1500 mAh	Li-Ion 1500 mAh	Li-Ion 2050 mAh	Li-Ion 1600 mAh	Li-Ion 2000 mAh	Li-Ion 2050 mAh	Li-Ion 2300 mAh	Li-Ion 2050 mAh
Processor	Dual-core 1.2 Ghz	Spredtrum – SC7731G Quad-core 1.3 GHz	Dual-core 1.2 GHz	Dual-core 1.2 GHz	Single-core 1 GHz	Quad-core 1.3 GHz	Quad-core 1.3 GHz	Quad-core 1.3 GHz	Quad-core 1.3 GHz	Quad-core 1.3 GHz	Octa-core 1.7 GHz	Octa-core 1.7 GHz
OS	5.1.0 Lollypop	5.1.0 Lollypop	5.1.0 Lollypop	5.1.0 Lollypop	4.2.0 Jelly Bean	4.4.0 KitKat	4.4.0 KitKat	4.4.0 KitKat	5.0.0 Lollypop	4.4.0 KitKat	4.4.0 KitKat	4.4.0 KitKat
Release date	Dec 2015	Nov 2015	Nov 2015	Oct 2015	Sept 2015	Aug 2015	July 2015	July 2015	June 2015	May 2015	Mar 2015	Jan 2015

=== 2014 ===
	H9	H3	Hexa	V9i	V9	V5	V3C	V3B	V3	D3	D3B	L2	L1
Dimensions	154 × 76.8 × 7.2 mm	145.8 × 73.5 × 8.8 mm	143.3 x 71.6 x 8.3 mm	146 x 72.7 x 10 mm	146 x 72.7 x 10 mm	122.9 x 64.6 x 10.8 mm	123.6 x 65 x 8.5 mm	123.6 x 65 x 8.5 mm	122.5 x 64 x 9 mm	123 x 64 x 11 mm	123 x 54 x 11 mm	101.25 x 56.6 x 12.85 mm	118 x 50.5 x 12.9 mm
Weight	166 g	175 g	175 g	170 g	170 g	161 g	161 g	165 g	165 g	141 g	147 g	132 g	127 g
Display	5" FHD	5" HD	5" HD	5" FWVGA	5" FWVGA	4" WVGA	4" WVGA	4" WVGA	4" WVGA	3.5" HVGA	3.5" HVGA	2.8" TFT	2.4" TFT
Resolution	1980x1080 pixels	1280x720 pixels	1280x720 pixels	854x480 pixels	854x480 pixels	800x480 pixels	800x480 pixels	800x480 pixels	800x480 pixels	480x320 pixels	480x320 pixels	320x240 pixels	320x240 pixels
Internal Storage	2 GB	1 GB	1 GB	512 MB	512 MB	512 MB	512 MB	512 MB	512 MB	256 MB	256 MB	64 MB	64 MB
Memory	16 GB	8 GB	8 GB	4 GB	4 GB	4 GB	4 GB	4 GB	4 GB	512 MB	512 MB	64 MB	64 MB
Rear Camera	13 MP	8 MP	8 MP	8 MP	8 MP	5 MP	8 MP	8 MP	8 MP	2 MP	2 MP	1.3 MP	1.3 MP
Front Camera	5 MP	2 MP	3.2 MP	0.3 MP	0.3 MP	0.3 MP	0.3 MP	0.3 MP	0.3 MP	1.3 MP	1.3 MP	NA	NA
Battery	Li-Ion 2050 mAh	Li-Ion 2500 mAh	Li-Ion 2450 mAh	Li-Ion 2000 mAh	Li-Ion 2000 mAh	Li-Ion 1500 mAh	Li-Ion 1400 mAh (with 1 spare Battery)	Li-Ion 1400 mAh (with 1 spare Battery)	Li-Ion 1400 mAh (with 1 spare Battery)	Li-Ion 1500 mAh	Li-Ion 1500 mAh	Li-Ion 1100 mAh	Li-Ion 1500 mAh
Processor	Octa-core 1.7 GHz	Quad-core 1.3 GHz	Hexa-core 1.5 GHz	Dual-core 1.2 GHz	Dual-core 1.2 GHz	Dual-core 1.2 GHz	Dual-core 1.2 GHz	Dual-core 1.2 GHz	Dual-core 1.2 GHz	Single-core 1.0 GHz	Single-core 1.0 GHz	Single-core 1.0 GHz	Single-core 1.0 GHz
OS	4.4.2 KitKat	4.4.2 KitKat	4.4.2 KitKat	4.4.2 KitKat	4.4.2 KitKat	4.2.2 Jelly Bean	4.2.2 Jelly Bean	4.2.2 Jelly Bean	4.2.2 Jelly Bean	4.4.2 KitKat	4.4.2 KitKat	NA	NA
Release date	Nov 2014	Oct 2014	Sept 2014	July 2014	July 2014	June 2014	May 2014	May 2014	May 2014	Apr 2014	Apr 2014	Mar 2014	Mar 2014

=== 2013 ===
	V6	i5
Dimensions	135.76 × 69.74 × 7.9 mm	136 × 68 × 12 mm
Weight	128 g	125 g
Display	4.65" HD	4.5" QHD
Resolution	720x1280 pixels	960x540 pixels
Internal Storage	512 MB	1 GB
Memory	1 GB	4 GB
Rear Camera	8 MP	8 MP
Front Camera	2 MP	2 MP
Battery	Li-Ion 1800 mAh	Li-Ion 2000 mAh
Processor	Quad-core 1.2 GHz	Quad-core 1.2 GHz
OS	4.2.2 Jelly Bean	4.1.0 Jelly Bean
Release date	Jan 2013	Feb 2013
