= Topray Solar =

Solar Energy Company

Shenzhen Topray Solar
- Type: Public (SZSE: 002218)
- Industry: Photovoltaics; Renewable Energy
- Founded: Shenzhen, China (1999)
- Headquarters: Shenzhen, China
- Products: Solar Modules
- Number of employees: 890 (2025)
- Website: www.topraysolar.com

Shenzhen Topray Solar (Chinese: 拓日新能; pinyin: Tuòrì) is a solar energy company. It is a publicly listed company on China Shenzhen Stock Exchange (Stock Ticker: 002218).

In 2017, the European Commission alleged that Shenzhen Topray Solar had repeatedly violated the minimum price agreement for solar products.

In 2020, a whistleblower in Uganda petitioned the Inspectorate of Government to investigate how Topray Solar was awarded a deal to install and maintain solar panels for Ugandan secondary schools.

== See also ==
- Photovoltaics
- Building-integrated photovoltaics
- Solar energy
- Solar panel
