= Feiyue =

Chinese footwear company

Feiyue 飞跃
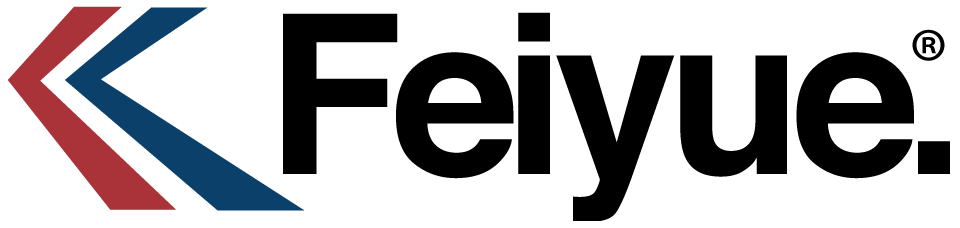
- Product type: Footwear
- Current owner: DaFu Rubber Company (China); Feiyue International (Worldwide)
- Produced by: DaFu Rubber Company (Shanghai)
- Country: China
- Introduced: 1958; 68 years ago
- Markets: Worldwide (Concentration: United Kingdom, United States, China, France)
- Registered as a trademark in: Feiyue International: United States, France, Australia, New Zealand, South Korea, Taiwan; DaFu Rubber: China
- Website: chinafeiyue.cn feiyue-shoes.com

Feiyue is a Chinese shoe brand founded in Shanghai owned by Dafu Rubber Co., Ltd. The brand was acquired by Feiyue International, a subsidiary of BBC International LLC in 2014.

The word "Feiyue" (simplified Chinese: 飞跃; traditional Chinese: 飛躍; pinyin: fēi yuè) means "to leap" or "to fly over" and is reminiscent of the Great Leap Forward.

The shoes were first produced in Shanghai during the 1920s. Since 2006 there have been two separate companies creating Feiyue shoes: Da Fu Rubber and its subsidiary manufacturer, Double Coin Holdings, and a French company operating separately from the original Chinese company.

A number of performers wore Feiyue China shoes during the opening ceremony of the 2008 Summer Olympics in Beijing. Actor Orlando Bloom was spotted wearing the French version of Feiyue shoes.

The Chinese factory has 3,000 employees producing 36,000 pairs a day, with an average of 5,000,000 pairs sold in China yearly.

== History ==
Feiyue's roots can be traced to the 1920s when cloth shoes were manufactured in Shanghai. In 1958, DaFu Rubber Company designed and produced a kind of civil shoe known as "Feiyue," a modification of the cloth shoes used by the Shaolin monks. They gained popularity during the 1930s for their robustness, flexibility, and comfort, which were considered essential requirements for martial arts and various forms of athletics. The shoes are a staple for almost all wushu practitioners and athletes in China, with the shoes being used by Shaolin monks and Kung Fu masters.

In 1963, using Feiyue and double arrow-labeled chevrons with "Feiyue track and field," the company became the best-selling shoe in China with an output of 1,616,000 pairs. By the 1980s, Feiyue sold about 4 million pairs yearly. With the opening up of China and the associated cultural and economic shifts, the sneaker began to lose prominence in China, and by the end of the 1990s, the brand started selling in bulk due to low demand. Once a highly regarded brand, by then, only elderly people and martial arts practitioners valued it as a cheap and durable brand. In 2003, Shanghai Shenglong relaunched the production of shoes.

In 2005, Patrice Bastian got together with a group of artists to change the brand name. In February 2006, they launched the first French-designed Feiyue Shoe collection.

The DaFu Rubber Company reorganized and sold the rights to Feiyue to the "Shuang Qian Group Co. Ltd," in 2009. That company leased manufacturing back to DaFu and another manufacturer, "Top One" (大博文).

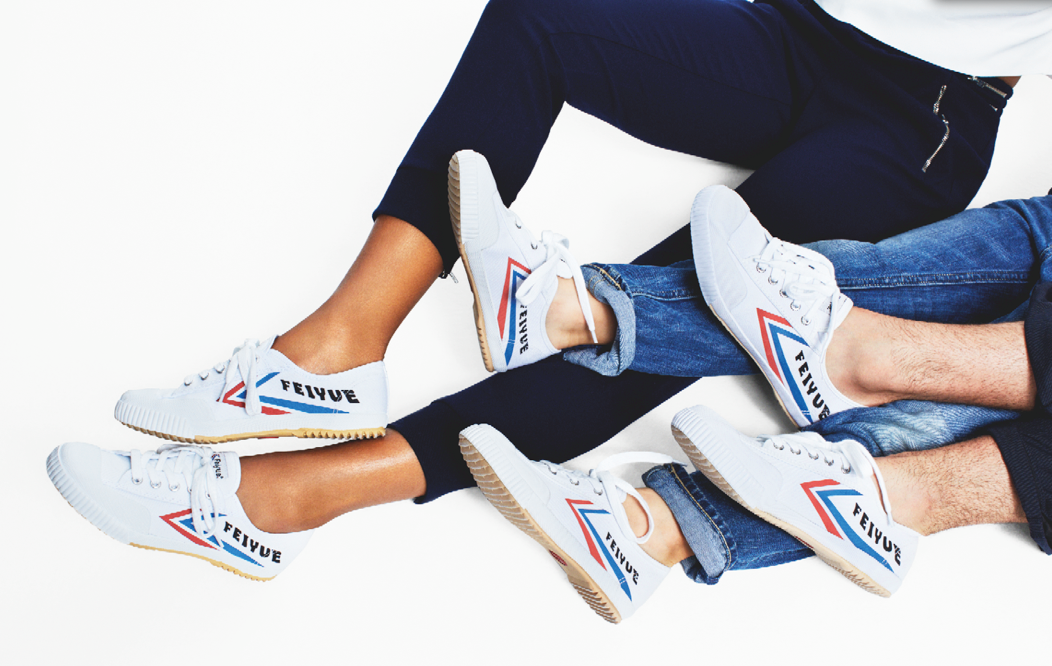
Feiyue Shoes U.S. Marketing Campaign

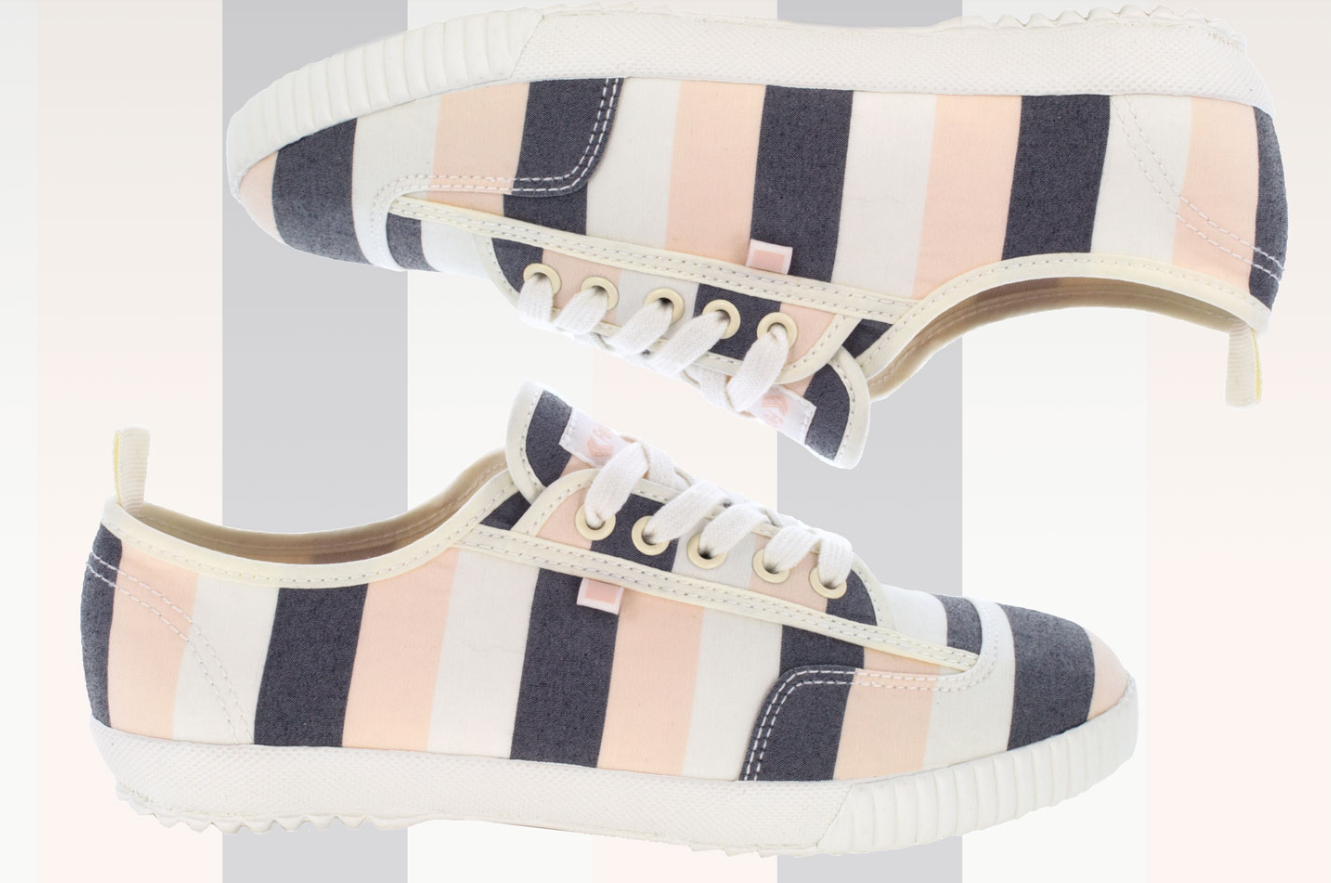
Feiyue x Solid & Striped Collaboration

In 2014, BBC International, the Boca Raton, Florida-based footwear firm, acquired the French Feiyue shoe company. Upon working with BBC, Feiyue's men's, women's, and children's collections were updated and globally introduced in Spring of 2015.

BBC has made a large new collection that builds on its existing brand. It uses high-quality materials like leather.

In 2015, BBC International Launched a collaboration with Feiyue and Peanuts for a limited-edition collection. Before BBC's acquisition deal in August 2014, Feiyue had major success in collaborations, including collections with Celine, André, Casio, Bonton, NSBQ, and more; and continues with other collaborations beginning with Peanuts.

The American Feiyue company collaborated in 2016 with the Solid & Striped clothing company, with textiles based on Solid & Striped designs.

== Intellectual property rights dispute ==
A dispute exists surrounding the trademark and intellectual property rights to Feiyue between the United States-owned company, Feiyue International, LLC, and Shanghai Da Fu Rubber Co, the company that originally manufactured the shoe. Liu Qinglong, manager of Shanghai Da Fu Rubber Co Ltd, said of the situation in 2017, "No one in China knew about commodity intellectual property rights at the time and it wasn't until 2007–08 that we found out the French had registered the trademark." According to the Young Post: "Liu claims the French company took advantage of the Chinese at a time when China was still grappling with capitalism and transitioning from all factories being state-owned assets to devolving some rights to individual businesses."

Patrice Bastian, former co-founder and creative director of Feiyue International, LLC, labels Chinese Feiyue "counterfeit," claiming "Feiyue in the US are the original ones because we have the brand registration." He also comments, "It's actually a legal issue and there are many things that we cannot control." According to Bastian, while he was living in Asia in 2005, he became enamored of Feiyue's white vulcanized shoes. A sneaker collector, Bastien traveled to the factory to buy his lifetime supply and ended up making a bid to buy the brand (with partners Nicolas Seguy and Clement Fauth), financing the purchase by selling his sneaker collection. However, Da Fu maintains that Bastien made this purchase from a manufacturer and not from them, the original company, having not heard of the Bastian at all until 2007. In 2017, Bastian claimed that he didn't know exactly who owned the factory he purchased the brand from.

Da Fu retains the trademark rights to Feiyue in China, but the US-based Feiyue holds the rights in much of the world, including France, Australia, New Zealand, South Korea, and Taiwan. Da Fu took Feiyue International, LLC to court for the rights in France, but lost the lawsuit. As such, the US-based Feiyue retains the rights regarding their trademarks, trade names, brand names, and trade dress, and claims protection by international laws and treaties.

== Distinctions between the original authentic Chinese and re-designed American versions ==
The original Chinese versions of the Feiyue shoes and the re-designed American versions have a number of differences. The differences include:

=== Sole ===
The sole of the Chinese Feiyue shoe contains reduced padding on the bottom of the shoe, which is considered desirable for martial arts activities. The sole of the French version has thicker padding on the bottom and is designed for more general-purpose use. The seal at the center of the sole is a green triangle on the Chinese Feiyue, while the marking is a red circle on the American version. However, recently the Chinese version manufactured by Da Fu has begun to use the American red circle; those manufactured by Top One retain the green triangle.

=== Canvas material ===
The canvas material of the Chinese Feiyue shoe is thin, resulting in a large range of ankle flexibility. The martial arts application requires a wide range of foot motions. The canvas material of the American version is much thicker.

=== Color ===
The original Chinese Feiyues originally came in only two colors, black and white, with a HI and LO version of each. The shoes were previously only available in a limited range of styles—simple stripes with some different colors. The range of colors and styles has now grown tremendously both under the American-owned company and the Chinese-owned one, with the BBC International brand offering a wide variety of colors and the Da Fu brand offering a "rainbow" set of shoes.

=== Style ===
The American version of the shoe offers a wide variety of fashion-forward choices for men, women, and kids. Consequently, collaborations with Céline, Agnès B, and Swarovski followed, as did fans, including Miranda Kerr, Reese Witherspoon, and Orlando Bloom. The Chinese version of the shoe, on the other hand, has around 150 different styles of the shoes catered toward Chinese fashion tastes.
