= YaqinAudio =

Chinese audio electronics manufacturer

Yaqin (pronounced "Ja-chin") is one of the more prolific Chinese manufacturers of valve (tube) based audio equipment. They claim to have "engage [sic] in power amplifier research and production more than 10 years." Despite having several disadvantages compared to modern transistorised (solid state) equipment, a valve sound is preferred by some commentators as having the most pleasing listening experience but has until recently been typically more expensive than transistorised equipment.

== Description ==
Yaqin equipment is primarily designed for a 220 V AC mains electricity supply voltage. In countries with 240 V AC such as the UK, some caution should be observed. Rebadged models have been offered for sale claiming to have dealt with the power supply issues. Unless you have a 240 V version which is available by special order, then it is wise to use a Variac (variable transformer) to drop the power to the required 220 V for the amplifier's mains transformer, as notwithstanding EU mains harmonisation, the UK's 240v voltage has never changed, the continental Europe tolerance for 230v instead changing its tolerance from 230v +/-5% to 230v -5%/+10%. With valve equipment, depending on mains transformer secondary voltages, a 20 V overload on the mains input could result in about a 40 V overload (or more) on the HT (high tension) side. Use of correct input voltage is important. If in any doubt as to the voltage of your Yaqin, remove the cover from the power transformer, Yaqin typically stamps the primary voltage on the top. The supplied mains lead have been identified as poor quality and sometimes not fused, discard it and use your own lead.

US and Canadian import models have a 110-120 V mains transformer. In America, with 110 V current, the MC-13S tube amplifier made by Yaqin Ling--(an actual person) makes these products essentially by hand, even though Ling's command of English (as noted below) is imperfect.

Little reliable English-language data is available as of 2010. Often comical Engrish translations exist, for example 'First class-B gall stone is combined, grade is SRPP circuit before the gallbladder. The wide speed is fast frequently, the sound is nice.' Having said that, 'gallbladder' is a mistranslation of tube or valve common to machine translation systems.

== Known models ==
Pre-amplifiers

- MS-12B 2*12AX7, 2*12AU7 tubes MM pre-stage with additional line-input

Phono Stages

- MS-11B solid state MM pre-stage
- MS-22B 2*12AX7 tubes MM pre-stage - discontinued
- MS-23B 2*12AX7 tubes MM pre-stage - replaced MS-22B
- MS-33B 2*12AX7, 1*12AU7 MM/MC pre-stage

Headphone-amplifier

- PH-5L hybrid amplifier 2*6J1 tubes
- PH-6L hybrid amplifier 2*6J1 tubes (made for DestinY Audio in Germany only)

Tube-amplifiers

- MC-84L - 12 WPC 4*EL84 tubes
- MC-6P1P - 12WPC in ultralinear mode, 6WPC in triode mode 4* 6P1P tubes
- MC-5881A - 23 WPC 4*5881 tubes
- MC-10L - 52 WPC replaced MC-10K model, 4*EL34 tubes/6N1P pre-tubes or ECC88 can be used. Now discontinued.
- MC-10T - 40 WPC replaced MC-10L 4*EL34 tubes (uses pre-amp board from the 13s so 12 series tubes are used)
- MC-13S - 40 WPC 4*EL34 tubes
- MC-50L - 60 WPC 4*KT88 tubes
- MC-100B - 30 WPC triode mode, 60 Wpc in ultralinear mode 4*KT88 tubes
- MC-350B -9 WPC simplified 300B SE amplifier with three inputs, headphone output, no remote 2*300B tubes
- MC-550B - 18 WPC 4*300B tubes
- ML-750M -32 WPC triode mode, 65 Wpc in ultralinear mode 4*KT88 tubes
- MS-6V6 - 12.5 WPC 4*6V6 tubes
- MS-6CA7 - 45 WPC 4*6CA7 tubes
- MS-34C - 10.5 WPC logarithmic loudness, headphone output 2*EL34 tubes
- MS-10S - 52 WPC (export version of MC-13S with 12AU7 tube pre stage and remote control made for DestinY Audio in Germany only (EL34 plus RC)) 4*EL34 tubes - discontinued
- MS-20L - 50 WPC 4*EL34 tubes
- MS-34D - 42 WPC 4*EL34 tubes
- MS-34B - 50 WPC works with EL34/6CA7 and KT88/6550 tubes (from Grant Fidelity Canada/US (A-348) and DestinY Audio Germany (DestinY eXperience) available only) discontinued
- MS-35B - 50 WPC new version of MS-34B with sub-output (made for DestinY Audio Germany (DestinY eXperience) only)
- MS-88B - 70 WPC 4*KT88 tubes
- MS-110B - 45 WPC 4*KT88 tubes
- MS-300B - 8,5 WPC Single Ended amplifier 2*300B tubes
- MS-300C - 9,5 WPC (replaced MS-300B) Single Ended amplifier 2*300B tubes
- MS-500B - 9,5WPC (from Grant Fidelity Canada/US (A-534) and DestinY Audio Germany (300B MK2) available only) Single Ended amplifier 2*300B tubes
- MS-2A3 - 14 WPC 4*2A3 tubes
- MS-845 - 25 WPC monoblock amplifiers with separate pre amplifier, Single Ended 2*845 tubes
- MS-650 - 15 WPC Single Ended 2*845 tubes
- T-6P3P - 4 WPC triode mode, 12 WPC in ultralinear mode, Headphone output, Single Ended amplifier 2*6P3P tubes

Hybrid-amplifiers

- VK-2100 - 85 WPC 4*12AX7 tubes

CD player with tube output

- SD-28A - discontinued
- SD-30A - discontinued
- SD-32A - discontinued
- SD-33A
- SD-35A

Tube buffers

- CD1 1*6N1 tube
- CD2 2*6J1 tubes
- CD3 2*6N8P tubes

Power filter

- ML-1000 (4*US sockets)
- ML-1100 (8*US sockets)
- ML-1100EU (8*Schuko sockets)

List permanently updated by T.Langer

== Notes ==
The name 'Yaqin' is unclear in origin. It may derive from the Chinese musical instrument Yazheng or may also relate to the Arabic word Yaqin meaning certainty. The 'Ya' character (雅) means 'elegant' or 'proper'. The 'qin' character (琴) could easily be a family name. It is also notable that the logo contains the Greek letters 'Ψ' in place of the 'Y' and 'Θ' in place of 'Q'. This has led to multiple confusing alternative references on the web to both 'Yaoin' and the hypercorrected 'Yaquin'. In fact, however, it is the manufacturer's family patronymic.
