= Hotgen Biotech =

Chinese biotechnology company

- Native name
- Simplified Chinese: 热景生物
- Traditional Chinese: 熱景生物
- Type: Public
- Traded as: SSE: 688068
- Founded: 2005
- Founder: Changqing Lin
- Headquarters: Beijing, China
- Revenue: CN¥5.369 billion (2021)
- Website: www.hotgenbiotech.com

Hotgen Biotech (short for Beijing Hotgen Biotech Co., Ltd.), often simply referred to as Hotgen, is a Chinese biological technology company founded in 2005. It focuses on the manufacture of in-vitro diagnostic instruments and reagents. In September 2019, the company was listed on the Shanghai Stock Exchange. During the novel coronavirus pandemic, it specialized in making 2019-nCoV antigen diagnostic products, which obtained EU CE certification.

Hotgen was formerly a constituent of the STAR 50 Index. Headquartered in Beijing, it also established presences in foreign markets, such as the United Kingdom, France, and Germany. The net profit of the company in 2021 exceeded 2.3 billion yuan, an increase of more than sixteen times from the previous year. In 2022, its RAT kits were distributed free of charge by the Hong Kong Government to the public. In November 2023, it attended the MEDICA Trade Fair in Düsseldorf.

== History ==
Hotgen was established by Changqing Lin in 2005. In September 2019, it went public on the STAR Market, with stock symbol 688068.SH. In early 2021, its COVID antigen self-test kits gained market access in Germany.

As of April 2021, Hotgen's market cap surpassed RMB 10 billion. In March 2022, its RAT products were approved by the NMPA. In November, the Hotgen COVID-19 Antigen Home Test received an EUA from the FDA.
