= China Housing and Land Development =

China Housing and Land Development Inc.
- Type: Private
- Traded as: Nasdaq: CHLN
- Industry: Residential Construction
- Founded: 1992; 34 years ago
- Headquarters: Xi'an, People's Republic of China
- Key people: Pingji Lu (CEO)
- Revenue: ▲$30.5 million USD (2007)
- Operating income: ▲$25.4 million USD (2007)
- Net income: ▲$16.7 million USD (2007)
- Number of employees: 61 (2007)
- Website: www.chldinc.com

China Housing and Land Development Inc. is a Xi'an-based company that, through its subsidiaries, is engaged in the acquisition, development, management, and sale of commercial and residential real estate properties in the People's Republic of China.

It is the third-ranked housing and land development company in the Shaanxi province and ranked as the number one private housing and land development company in Xi'an.

== Notable projects ==
=== Tsining 24G ===
Located at 133 Changle Road, Xi'an, it consists in the redevelopment of a pre-existing building near the commercial belt of the city. It comprises approximately 240,000 sq ft (22,000 m^{2}) available for residential use, plus approx. 200,000 sq ft (19,000 m^{2}) for commercial use. It was completed in June 2006.

=== Tsining Junjing Garden I ===
Consists of a European style community located at 369 North Jinhua Road, Xi'an. It comprises 15 apartment buildings for a total of 1230 apartments. 290,000 sq ft (27,000 m^{2}) of additional property have been used for commercial businesses. The project was completed in September 2006.

=== Tsining Junjing Garden II ===
Built at 38 East Hujiamiao, Xi'an, the complex stretches through 18 acres (73,000 m^{2}) of land. The residential area consist of 2,119 one to five bedroom apartments.
