= Duoyuan Global Water =

Organization that specializes in water manufacturing & treating equipment

Duoyuan Global Water (NYSE: DGW) was a China-based company that specialized in manufacturing water and waste water treatment equipment. Duoyuan was founded in 1992 and provided over 100 types of products and treatment solutions for municipal, industrial, residential and agricultural water systems. Duoyuan created the first water treatment apparatus in China, and won awards for its products and treatment mechanisms. After accusations of fraud, the company was delisted from the New York Stock Exchange in 2012.

== History ==
Duoyuan was founded in 1992. It built a manufacturing facility in Beijing in 1994. Production of water purifying equipment began in 1998. An additional manufacturing facility was built in Langfang in 2000.

Duoyuan began production of sewage and waste water treatment equipment in 2001. In 2003 it established a postdoctoral water treatment and R&D center.

In 2009, Duoyuan Global Water, Inc. became the first water treatment equipment manufacturing company from China listed on the New York Stock Exchange, with an initial public offering on June 29 of $16.00 per share.

== Scandal ==
in 2011, Duoyuan announced the resignation of four members of the company's Board of Directors amidst allegations of fraudulent internal company controls. Duoyuan engaged international law firm Baker & McKenzie and an international accounting firm to conduct an internal investigation and review of the company.

Duoyuan Global Water has been accused of securities fraud in a class action lawsuit against the company, "We are optimistic that the newly appointed Special Investigation Committee will be able to work quickly towards a thorough and an early completion of their investigation," stated Mr. Wenhua Guo, the chairman of the board of directors.

In 2012, the New York Stock Exchange excluded the shares from trading.
