= China Clean Energy =

Chinese biodiesel producer

China Clean Energy, Inc.
- Type: Public (OTC: CCGY)
- Industry: Energy, Specialty Chemicals
- Founded: The company began operations in 1995 and launched its biodeisel operations in 2005.
- Headquarters: Delaware, United States registered company, headquartered in Fuqing City, Fujian Province, People's Republic of China
- Area served: China (Biodiesel), International (Specialty Chemicals)
- Key people: Tai-Ming Ou, Chairman and CEO; William Chen, Company CFO
- Products: Biodiesel, Specialty chemicals
- Revenue: $58.9 million USD (2010)
- Number of employees: 200
- Website: http://www.chinacleanenergyinc.com

China Clean Energy, Inc. (OTC: CCGY), through its wholly owned subsidiary Fujian Zhongde Technology Co., Ltd. ("Fujian Zhongde"), is a biodiesel and specialty chemical producer operating in the People's Republic of China and selling products both domestically there and worldwide.

== Biodiesel ==
The company uses waste vegetable oils, such as cotton seed leavings, and yellow grease, as feedstocks, processing them through proprietary technologies to produce biodiesel for local consumption and a variety of green chemicals for sale worldwide.

In early 2008, the company secured private funding through a special stock offering to create a 100,000 metric ton annual capacity biodiesel plant. The company's current plants are approximately one-tenth of that size.

== Specialty chemicals ==
The company produces by products of biodiesel and various specialty chemicals. Because these chemicals are produced from renewable feedstock, they can be considered "green" and sold for a premium in some markets.

Chemicals listed include: Monomer Acid, Stearic, Dimer Acid, Printing Inks, Dimer-Based Polyamide Hot Melt Adhesive, Low Molecular Weight Liquor Polyamide Resins, Polyamide Hot-Melt Adhesive, Alcohol-soluble Polyamide Resins, Benzene-Soluble Polyamide Resins, and Bio Heating Fuel.

== See also ==
- Bioenergy in China
