= ZGC Motors =

Chinese manufacturing and trading company

ZGC Mechanical & Electrical Co., Ltd.
- Native name: Chinese: 硕登
- Industry: Manufacturing
- Founded: 1998; 28 years ago in Changzhou, Jiangsu Province
- Headquarters: Changzhou, Jiangsu Province, China

ZGC Mechanical & Electrical Co., Ltd (Chinese: 硕登), also known as ZGC Motors, is a Chinese manufacturing and trading company, founded in 1998 at Changzhou, Jiangsu Province. ZGC offers brushless DC motors, stepping motors, PM DC Planetary gear motors, PM DC spur gear motors, LED drivers etc.

== LED Driver ==
New Plant started running on July 19, 2013 with 1000 m^{2} space, mainly provides led driver, lighting, electronic charger.

== Motors ==
ZGC invested in new production line in March 2012. Mainly provides motor gear for variety business needs.
