= Shanghai Pharmaceuticals =

Chinese pharmaceutical company

Shanghai Pharmaceuticals Holding Co. Ltd.
- Type: Public
- Traded as: SSE: 601607 SEHK: 2607
- Industry: Pharmaceuticals
- Founded: 1994
- Headquarters: Shanghai, China
- Area served: Asia-Pacific, China
- Revenue: ▲US$ 36,769 million (2023)
- Net income: US$ 532 million (2023)
- Total assets: US$ 29,865 billion (2023)
- Number of employees: 48,164 (2023)
- Website: www.sphchina.com

Shanghai Pharmaceuticals (Chinese: 上海医药, also referred as Shanghai Pharma) is a private-sector Chinese pharmaceutical company. The organization develops and distributes pharmaceutical products and operates in domestic and international markets.

Shanghai Pharma is the largest pharmaceutical and the first A+H listed company in China to be dual-listed by Shanghai and Hong Kong Stock Exchanges. As of 2020, the company made its presence to the Global Fortune 500 list with the ranking of 473, overall and 124 among 21 other Chinese companies on the list.

Shanghai Pharmaceuticals was founded in 1994 and is headquartered in Shanghai. As an investment holding company, it is actively engaged in research, manufacturing and distribution of pharmaceutical and healthcare products in China, that develops and distributes traditional Chinese and chemical drugs, chemical, biochemical and healthcare goods that are applied in various therapeutic fields, including immunoregulation and anti-cancer, immune system and digestion, cardiovascular and anti-infection, nervous system and mental disorder. Shanghai Pharma also offers logistics, warehousing and other value-added pharmaceutical supply chain and related support services to the pharmaceutical manufacturers and distributors such as hospitals and retail pharmacies, in addition to running a network of retail drug stores and around 1,800+ chained pharmacies, operating in 16 provinces.

In November 2017, Shanghai Pharma announced the acquisition of U.S. based pharmaceutical distributor Cardinal Health's China operations for about $557 million. The deal made Shanghai Pharmaceuticals the largest distributor for imported drugs in China and the second largest distributor in the overall pharmaceutical distribution. Cardinal is the third largest pharmaceutical company in the United States, which prior to the deal was the eighth largest pharmaceutical company in China. The acquisition strategy was considered a part of its two-stage approach to growth with the central research and development, as it is reported that the company spends between $100 million to $150 million every year on the research and development, which is about 15% to 20% of its profit.
