= SmithStreetSolutions =

Strategy consulting firm headquartered in Shanghai, China

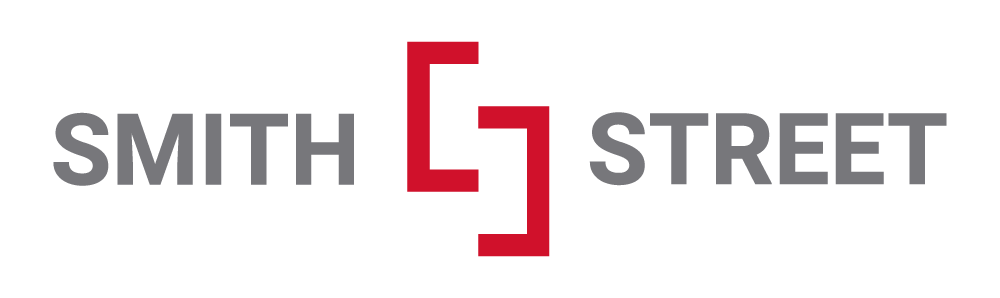
- Type: Incorporated
- Industry: Management consulting
- Founded: May 2007
- Headquarters: Shanghai, China
- Key people: Franklin Yao, Managing Partner; Robin Kerawala, Partner and Co-founder
- Products: Corporate Strategy, Market Research, Investment Research & Analytics, China Advisory Services
- Website: smithstreet-china.com

SmithStreet (SmithStreetSolutions (Shanghai) Co., Ltd.) (Chinese: 斯密街商务咨询（上海）有限公司) is a strategy consulting firm headquartered in Shanghai, China. The firm specializes in China market entry and growth strategy and syndicated market research.

== Company History ==
The firm was founded in 2007 as a graphics and translation vendor and in 2009 was named in the top 20 global Knowledge Process Outsourcing (KPO) vendors. Since the end of 2008, the firm has focused on corporate strategy consulting. In 2018, the company re-branded, launching a new website and new logo.

== Corporate sponsorships ==
In 2007, SmithStreet partnered with the Joint US-China Collaboration on Clean Energy (JUCCCE), providing knowledge support services.

SmithStreet is also a supporter of Shanghai Roots & Shoots, an organization which educates youth about environmental issues and humanitarian values.

In April 2009, SmithStreet sponsored the 5th China Institute Executive Summit held in Beijing.

== Awards and recognition ==
In October 2014, SmithStreet report "Building Against Reality: Navigating China's Real Estate Inefficiencies" was the subject of an article in Women's Wear Daily.

In 2013, one of SmithStreet's projects was selected as Finalist case in The Economist Healthcare in Asia Conference 2013.

In 2010, the company received the Outstanding Business Application Prize for Digital Media Merit Award Asia, during DEVNET at World Expo 2010 Shanghai, China.
