= GMY Lighting Technology =

Chinese lighting component manufacturer

GMY Lighting Technology Co., LTD
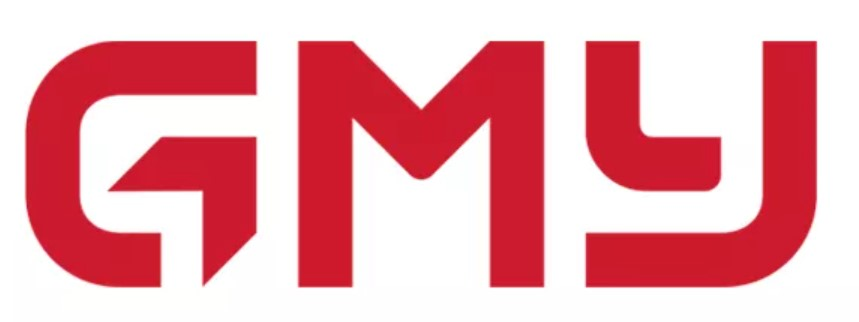
- Trade name: GMY
- Industry: Lighting components and products
- Founded: August 9, 1998; 27 years ago in Jiangmen, Guangdong, China
- Founder: Yannan "Edward" Hong
- Headquarters: Heshan, Guangdong, China

GMY Lighting Technology Co., LTD (Chinese: 广明源光科技股份有限公司, doing business as GMY), is a large manufacturer of light source components and products, located in Heshan, Guangdong, China.

== History and recognition ==
GMY was founded in 1998 by Yannan "Edward" Hong, and commercially registered in September 2002. By 2010, GMY was the world's largest manufacturer of halogen bulbs.

GMY opened the largest comprehensive plant factory in South China in 2015. In 2017, GMY was recognized as a "Guangdong Provincial Enterprise Technology Center." GMY won the "Ai Rui Cup" in 2018 as one of the China Automotive Industry's top five national brands. It received recognition by the Guangdong Provincial Department of Industry and Information Technology in its list of "2022 Guangdong Province Specialized, Special and New Small and Medium-sized Enterprises."

GMY's 222nm ultraviolet light modules won the Zhongzhao China Lighting Award for Science and Technology Innovation issued by the Chinese Lighting Society in March 2022. The award noted that "The 222nm excimer lamp emits accurate 222nm wavelength ultraviolet light, which is safer to use than traditional 185nm and 254nm ultraviolet light. It does not produce mercury and is harmless to the environment."

== Products ==
GMY's manufacturing facility covers an area of nearly 80,000 square meters, and has an annual output of hundreds of millions of light source products, which are sold to more than 100 countries. GMY's product line includes general lighting, automotive lighting, and specialized light sources, especially ultraviolet lights for disinfection, UV lighting for manufacturing processes, IPL lights for health and beauty applications, and artificial light vertical planting solutions.

GMY has obtained more than 300 patents, including more than 200 ultraviolet-related patents, ranking among the top five China. As of 2021, GMY ranked first in China with patents awarded for 253.7 nm and 185.0 nm ultraviolet germcidall ultraviolet lighting.
