= State-owned enterprises of China =

A state-owned enterprise of the People's Republic of China (Chinese: 国有企业) is a legal entity that undertakes commercial activities on behalf of an owner government.

As of 2017, the People's Republic of China has more state-owned enterprises (SOEs) than any other country, and the most SOEs among large national companies. As of the end of 2019, China's SOEs represented 4.5% of the global economy and the total assets of all China's SOEs, including those operating in the financial sector, reached US$78.08 trillion.

State-owned enterprises accounted for over 60% of China's market capitalization in 2019 and estimates suggest that they generated about 23-28% of China's GDP in 2017 and employ between 5% and 16% of the workforce. Ninety-one (91) of these SOEs belong to the 2020 Fortune Global 500 companies. Almost 867,000 enterprises have a degree of state ownership, according to Franklin Allen of Imperial College London.

The role of the Chinese Communist Party (CCP) in SOEs has varied at different periods but has increased during the general secretaryship of Xi Jinping, with the CCP formally taking a commanding role in all SOEs as of 2020.

== Role ==
The state sector is a major part of China's economy, with SOEs accounting for approximately 25% of the national GDP as of 2020. China's SOEs are among the largest global firms by revenue, and of the 135 Chinese companies on the Fortune Global 500 list (2023), 85 are state-owned. SOEs are important to domestic equity markets, accounting for about 40% of total market capitalization and 50% of company revenues on the Shanghai Stock Exchange and Shenzhen Stock Exchange.

When China's SOEs were first created, they served as instruments for carrying out national goals and providing social stability via the iron rice bowl. Through the danwei system, SOEs provided workers with housing, amenities, and social welfare benefits, functioning as communities where employees worked, lived, and socialized. Through this system, which existed until the late 1990s, urban SOE workers had higher levels of social welfare benefits as compared to other workers. Workers in collectively owned enterprises (owned at local levels of government, such as county or village) did not have as a high a level of social welfare benefits.

SOEs continue to support stability through providing employment and maintaining low prices for key economic inputs. SOEs spend much of their investment on infrastructure development in China's less developed interior provinces, and therefore also perform a redistributive role.

SOEs support China's industrial policy by channeling resources into sectors that the state regards as key, like artificial intelligence, nuclear power, aerospace, and electric vehicles. The work of SOEs helps China to move up the industrial value chain. Foreign business of SOEs also helps to address excess industrial capacity in China.

SOEs have monopolies in the industries of telecommunications, military equipment, railroads, tobacco, petroleum, and electric power. SOEs have a primary role in China's energy sector. Its five large state-owned power generation companies are: Datang, Guodian, Huadian, Huaneng, and China Power Investment Corporation. Its state-owned grid companies are State Grid Corporation of China (SGCC) and China Southern Power Grid Corporation.

Most Chinese universities are SOEs.

SOEs are important to major government initiatives including the targeted poverty alleviation campaign, Made in China 2025, and the Belt and Road Initiative. China's SOEs are at the forefront of global seaport construction, and most new ports built by them are part of the BRI. State-owned banks are important sources of funding for port construction. Large overseas projects by SOEs can also be politically important to China's international relations.

SOEs that compete in the market are largely owned by provincial or sub-provincial governments. A significant cluster of these SOEs are joint ventures with foreign companies in the automotive industry.

In addition to their own operations, SOEs invest in private enterprises. From the perspective of these private enterprises, this form of partial state ownership is helpful in obtaining financing from banks, particularly as prompts banks to require less collateral. Sometimes in investing in private enterprises, SOEs acquire enough shares to nationalize them. Over the period 2018–2020, 109 publicly traded enterprises with more than $100 billion in collective total assets were nationalized in this way.

China's SOEs have historically provided most of its outbound foreign direct investment. Outbound FDI from SOEs have benefitted from policy support including export buyers' credits and concessional loans from policy banks.

SOEs help stabilize public finance, including through allowing the government to use assets as collateral to issue debt or to sell shares to balance budgets. According to academic Wendy Leutert, China's SOEs, "...contribute to central and local governments revenues through dividends and taxes, support urban employment, keep key input prices low, channel capital towards targeted industries and technologies, support sub-national redistribution to poorer interior and western provinces, and aid the state's response to natural disasters, financial crises and social instability."

Financial performance of SOEs was not a major concern until China's reform era. With the exception of a small number of national monopolies, SOEs compete in the market as privately enterprises do. State ownership does not prevent SOEs from seeking to make profits; rather they are incentivized to make profits to increase the value of the state's assets. Although China's SOEs seek to make profits, they do not necessarily seek to maximize them. Academic Wendy Leutert describes them as frequently behaving as "'asset maximizers' rather than 'profit maximizers'."

== History of SOEs ==
=== Nationalist era ===
Sun Yat-sen contended that China should develop state-owned firms and make the national industries of China into "a great trust owned by the Chinese people."

When China's Nationalist government controlled northeast China from 1946 to 1948 after the end of the Second Sino-Japanese War, it restructured formerly Japanese enterprises into SOEs. It also confiscated the enterprises of puppet states, such as the Wang Jingwei regime. Most of these enterprises were re-organized into the National Resources Commission, China Textile Construction Company, and China Merchants Steam Navigation Company.

After the war, the Nationalist government focused on industrial reconstruction in Manchuria. As a result, it many SOEs in inland China were privatized, transferred to local governments, or shut down.

=== Early People's Republic of China ===
Following the CCP victory in the Chinese Civil War, one of the party's early steps was to nationalize enterprises that the defeated Nationalists had controlled. At the founding of the People's Republic of China, 27.8% of the country's industrial output came from SOEs. Over the 1950s, the government gradually restructured the industry under state ownership. By 1956, SOEs produced more than 80% of China's industrial output.

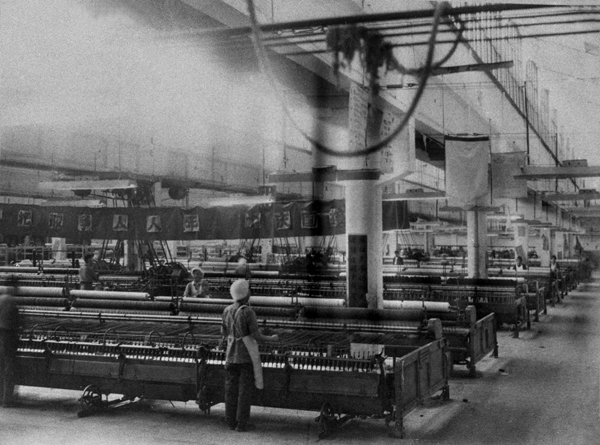
The spinning workshop of First Wool Textile Factory of Lanzhou, 1960.

In the early years of the PRC, the Manchuria region had the highest concentration of SOEs. These were prominent in the PRC heavy industry-focused method of "socialist industrialization" (a term adopted from the Soviets).

The policy trend from the early to mid-1950s was to centralize control over SOEs. SOEs were generally within the authority of central government industrial ministries during the First Five-Year Plan period of 1953–1957. Proponents of centralizing authority over SOEs included Gao Gang.

During the Great Leap Forward, control of SOEs was largely decentralized, with control being transferred to local governments instead of the central government. This process of decentralization also significantly increased the power of local CCP organizations.

During the Third Front campaign to develop heavy industry in China's interior regions, almost 400 state-owned enterprises were re-located from coastal cities to secret sites in the Chinese interior where they would be more protected in event of foreign invasion.

During the Cultural Revolution, significant amounts of authority over national SOEs was transferred to local CCP cadres and People's Liberation Army officials. Among the major SOEs transferred to local control during this period were Daqing Oil Field, Changchun Auto Manufacturing, and Anshan Iron and Steel.

=== Reform and opening up ===
The period from 1978 to 1991 was characterized by "deal track" economic reform of SOEs. The relationship between the state and SOEs shifted from central command to strategic bargaining. SOE leaders were significant in experimentation with reform policies and could negotiate with their administrative superiors on various matters, including production targets and budgets.

Beginning the late 1970s, SOEs became allowed to pay bonuses to workers.

As a response to the return of Sent-down youth, SOEs in the late 1970s and 1980s often started collectively-owned enterprises to create employment opportunities for the family of SOE workers. This approach to providing jobs was particularly common in northeast China.

Under Deng Xiaoping's leadership, the trend towards localizing authority over SOEs was reversed, and SOE management was again centralized. The government sought to make SOEs more independent from local CCP authorities by strengthening the power of SOE directors relative to the party committees within enterprises. This approach, called "the director responsibility system under the party-committee leadership" was similar to the Soviet one-chief system of the early and middle 1950s.

Beginning in the early 1980s, the central government began to develop multi-regional "general companies" which became the predecessors of central SOEs and national champions.

In 1984, the State Council issued a directive to expand the autonomy of SOEs. SOEs were also allowed to sell surplus goods on the market once they had met their quotas. Through the reform of "substituting taxes for profits" (li gai shui) the government sought to give SOEs incentives to pursue profits, sought to reduce SOE dependence on the government, and sought to increase market competition. Rather than requiring SOEs to remit profits to the state, SOEs were instead subjected to income tax. Implementation of this policy was hampered by political contentions and too-hasty introduction. Following adoption of "substituting taxes for profits", SOE profits declined for 22 consecutive months.

=== Jiang Zemin administration ===
After the failure of the tax-for-profit approach, China implemented its Contract Responsibility System which remained in place until the middle 1990s. Through this system, SOEs submitted an amount of their profit to the state per their contracts with the state, but could keep remaining profits. This was intended to increase the managerial autonomy of SOEs without privatizing their ownership.

Increased diplomatic openness in the 1980s and 1990s helped SOEs to negotiate better trade terms.

Beginning in 1991, policymakers introduced the concept of enterprise groups, initially piloting the idea with 57 SOEs. Through this organizational approach, a large SOE or a cluster of SOEs was re-organized into an enterprise group through which a parent company controlled various subsidiaries. SOEs in enterprise groups separated profit-making assets into subsidiaries which could be listed on China's stock markets, thereby introducing private capital without eliminating state control and ownership. Non-profit making assets and social welfare assets (like schools, housing, and hospitals) were either kept by the parent enterprise or transferred to local governments. Housing assets were often then sold to SOE employees at below-market prices. By May 1997, 120 SOEs (accounting for approximately 25% of SOE assets in the China) had been organized into enterprise groups.

With the goal of boosting innovation and efficiency, more than half of China's largest SOEs had established technical development centers by 1993. The same year, the CCP issued its "Decision on Issues Related to the Establishment of a Socialist Market Economy System." In the wave of reform thereafter, one goal was to separate SOE management from government and to empower a select group of SOEs with special property rights and autonomy. The principles of the socialist market economy also legitimized the idea that ownership of SOEs could be structured in various forms, including majority state-owned joint stock companies. In 1994, three of the largest industrial firms were selected for a pilot program of restructuring as state holding companies, thereby enabling partial public listings of their subsidiaries' assets: Sinopec, Aviation Industry Corporation of China (AVIC), and China Nonferrous Metals Industry Group.

The 1994 Company Law provided restructuring guidelines for SOEs, such as SOEs adopting more corporate structures like shareholding and limited liability, procedures for paying dividends, establishing subsidies, and bankruptcy. The law stated that the government would continue to make supervisory appointments for SOEs and provided that workers would be consulted. Some smaller SOEs sold their shares to workers and management, therefore making them privately owned.

Consistent with CCP general secretary Jiang Zemin and Chinese premier Zhu Rongji's strategy of grasping the large, letting go of the small, major SOE reform occurred in 1997, which represented a change from the previously incremental reform efforts. The state was encouraged to preserve large SOEs and to allow weaker ones to be "let go" through closing or consolidating. Through "grasping the large", the state focused on developing a core group of large SOEs in strategically important fields deemed as part of the commanding heights of the economy. There was significant privatization of the smaller SOEs. Privatization occurred gradually and selectively.

Other major policies that were part of the 1997 reforms included management and employee buyouts and the inclusion of foreign strategic partners. Between 1997 and 1998, the number of industrial SOEs decreased by over 41%.

In 1998, the restructuring of the State Council resulted in the dissolution of the State Assets Administration Bureau, which had overseen central state-owned assets. This began a period when an increased number of government and CCP bodies were involved in supervising SOEs.

In the late 1990s, layoffs from SOEs, a process widely referred to as xiagang, sometimes without the promised compensation or pensions to those laid off led to widespread protests and discontent among the workers.

With regard to SOEs, Jiang emphasized the need for good corporate governance. In 1999, the Decision of the CPC Central Committee on Several Major Issues Concerning the Reform and Development of SOEs stated that all restructured SOEs must "clarify the responsibilities of the shareholders' meeting, the board of directors, the board of supervisors, and the management to form a corporate governance structure, with each assuming responsibility, coordinated operations, and effective checks and balances".

In the early 2000s, Jiang and Zhu's administration sought for large industrial SOEs to repackage assets for public listings. This involved separating core production functions of the SOEs from the noncore business and social welfare functions, and putting the production functions into subsidiaries which could be publicly listed as joint stock companies.

The general trend since 2000 has been for SOEs to increase in importance consistent with a broader resurgence of state activity in the market. SOE mergers have been routine since 2000.

=== Hu Jintao administration ===
Beginning in 2003 with Hu Jintao's administration, the Chinese government increasingly funded SOE consolidation, supplying massive subsidies and favoring SOEs from a regulatory standpoint. These efforts helped SOEs to crowd out foreign and domestic private sector competitors.

Hu and Premier Wen Jiabao created the State-owned Assets Supervision and Administration Commission (SASAC) in 2003 to oversee the 189 central SOEs that existed at the time. This ended the fragmentation of authority over state assets, which had increased after the dissolution of the State Assets Administration Bureau in 1998.

In 2004, SASAC and the Central Organization Department of the CCP piloted restructuring with seven central state-owned enterprises, which included the establishment of boards of directors at the company level, each with a minimum of two external board members chosen by SASAC.

As part of China Western Development program, China's five large state-owned hydropower companies planned, underwrote, and built the majority of dams on the river and its tributaries.

On 12 August 2005, the State Council released the Opinions on Encouraging, Supporting, and Guiding the Development of Individual Businesses, Private Firms, and Other Parts of the Non-State Economy (commonly known as the 36 Articles). The 36 Articles characterized the state-owned economy as the country's "mainstay" while stating that the private sector should also be guided and developed. The 36 Articles also established the principle of equal treatment for state-owned enterprises and private enterprises in areas where both could operate, although many of these reforms were not thoroughly implemented.

Beginning in 2007, central government SOEs were required to provide to the central government a portion of their capital income, stock dividends, property transfer income, enterprise liquidated income, and other state-owned capital income.

SOEs were major beneficiaries of China's stimulus program following the Great Recession, which began a period where the private sector withdrew and the state-owned sector expanded.

=== Xi Jinping administration ===
Overall, China's focus on SOEs during the Xi era have demonstrated a commitment to using SOEs to serve non-market objectives and increasing CCP control of SOEs while taking some limited steps towards market liberalization, such as increasing mixed (state and private) ownership of SOEs. Along with increased mergers, promotion of mixed ownership, and management of state capital have continued; results have been mixed. Transitioning solely state-owned enterprises to a mixed ownership was announced in 2013 at the 18th Central Committee of the Chinese Communist Party and re-affirmed by the 19th Party Congress. Acting on this announcement, in 2014 SASAC launched national level pilot programs for mixed ownership reform; the results were mixed.

The pace of SOE mergers has increased under CCP General Secretary Xi Jinping. The goals of China's current SOE mergers include an effort to create larger and more competitive national champions with a bigger global market share by reducing price competition among SOEs abroad and increasing vertical integration.

Central SOEs were investigated as part of Xi's anti-corruption campaign. The Central Commission for Discipline Inspection began inspections of two central SOEs in 2013, ten in 2014, 43 in 2015, 42 (and SASAC itself) in 2019, and 27 central SOEs in 2023. From the beginning of the campaign through 2017, twelve top executives of core central SOEs were removed from office based on corruption charges.

In 2014, the Fourth Plenum of the 18th Central Committee announced "lifelong accountability" for major operational and investment decisions made by top officials in the public sector. The State Council established a lifelong accountability system for SOE leaders in 2016. Through this system, any SOE leader who violates regulations, causes the loss of state assets or causes other "serious adverse consequences" may be held legally liable for their lifetime.

On 1 January 2015, the CCP Politburo issued its SOE Executive Compensation Reform Plan, which instituted a "pay ceiling order" that in some instances cut the pay of SOE heads by 50%.

The 2015 stock market turbulence and rising concerns about the security implications of relying on foreign technology led the Xi administration to increase its commitment to SOEs.

Following an August 2015 directive, SOEs' articles of association are required to specify the leading role of CCP organizations in their firms. The 2015 directive also increases the importance of party organizations within SOEs by requiring that the CCP committee secretary and the chair of the board must be the same person.

According to Xi, "[T]he dominant role of state ownership cannot be changed, and the leading role of the state-economy cannot be changed." In Xi Jinping Thought, the historical importance of state-owned enterprises is highlighted:

[W]ithout the important material foundation that state-owned enterprises have laid for China's development over a long period of time, without the major innovations and key core technologies achieved by state-owned enterprises, and without state-owned enterprises' long-term commitment to a large number of social responsibilities, there would be no economic independence and national security for China, no continuous improvement in people's lives, and no socialist China standing tall in the East of the world.

Xi Jinping Thought also emphasizes the role of SOEs as part of the dominant position of state ownership necessary for common prosperity.

Lai Xiaomin, the former president of state-owned China Huarong Asset Management announced in 2015 that during the operation of China Huarong Asset Management, the embedded CCP committee will play a central role, and party members will play an exemplary role. As Jin et al. wrote in 2022,

The overarching principle of SOE reform is to firmly implement the Party's leadership and the modern enterprise system. This principle creates a political governance system in China's SOEs—a Party-dominated governance system characterized by Party leadership, state ownership, Party cadre management, Party participation in corporate decision-making, and intra-Party supervision.

Xi emphasizes the leadership function of the CCP in SOEs and states that SOEs must make the party their "political core". He emphasizes the importance of CCP branches within SOEs. CCP branches within China's SOEs are the governing bodies which make important decisions and inculcate its ideology. In 2019, a CCP rule required SOE articles of association to require that major decisions must be discussed by the SOE's party committee before they are considered by management or by the board of directors.

By 2019, the Chinese government had disposed of 95% of central-level "zombie SOEs" which were "effectively insolvent but kept alive only by continuous bank loans and government subsidies". Around one-third of those SOEs went bankrupt, and the rest were reorganized through mergers and acquisitions and internal restructuring.

Since 2020, SOEs have been directed to hire more recent university graduates in order to reduce youth unemployment.

In 2023, multiple state-owned enterprises, including Shanghai Municipal Investment Group, established internal People's Armed Forces Departments run by the People's Liberation Army. They are expected "to work together with grassroots organizations to collect intelligence and information, dissolve and/or eliminate security concerns at the budding stage," according to the People's Liberation Army Daily.

In 2024, the Chinese government announced SOE management would be assessed based on stock market performance.

== State Council (Central Government) ==
=== China Investment Corporation ===
- Central Huijin Investment
  - China Jianyin Investment
  - China Everbright Group

=== SASAC of the State Council ===
Central SOEs (中央国有企业) or Yangqi (央企) are non-financial sector companies owned by the central government and administered through SASAC. These are the central SOEs which cover industries deemed most significant to the national economy, such as those in the defense, telecommunications, petroleum, or electricity industries. Central SOEs are further categorized based on their size and strategic importance. "Core" enterprises described as "important backbone SOEs" include enterprises such as China Mobile, State Grid, and Sinopec.

The directors of the central SOEs overseen by SASAC are appointed through the cadre system. The directors of the 50 largest are appointed directly by the Central Committee of the Chinese Communist Party and are equivalent in rank to ministers or vice ministers. Leaders of core central SOEs are assessed by the Organization Department of the CCP. SASAC appoints the heads of non-core central SOEs. The heads of non-core central SOEs have departmental-level rank. Although central SOE heads have rank equivalents, they are not civil servants. SASAC is not empowered to appointment or remove SOE management outside of the purview of the CCP's Organization Department.

The position of chairman is typically the highest authority in a central SOE. Typically, a single person at the SOE holds both the title of chairman and CCP Committee Secretary.

SASAC establishes yearly metrics for evaluating SOE leadership, such as operating revenue, profits, economic value added (EAV), and total new contract value.

Central SOEs are primarily structured as enterprise groups.

As of 2017, central SOEs held RMB 6 trillion (US$904 billion) in assets in more than 185 countries.

As of 2023, SASAC oversees 98 central SOEs. Companies directly supervised by SASAC have been reduced and consolidated through mergers according to the state-owned enterprise restructuring plan with the number of SASAC companies down from over 150 in 2008.

=== Ministry of Education ===
- Peking University
  - Founder Group (70%)
    - Peking University Resources Group (30% by Founder Group, 40% by Peking University directly)
      - Peking University Resources (Holdings) (65.96% collectively by Founder Group and PKU Resources Group)
    - Founder Technology
    - Founder Holdings
  - Jade Bird Software (48%)
    - Beida Jade Bird Universal Sci-Tech (24.05% collectively)
  - Sinobioway Group (40% as minority shareholder)

== Regional Governments ==
Governments below the national level operate portfolios of SOEs which operate both domestically and abroad. These SOEs are much more numerous than central SOEs, but each is smaller. Examples of regional or local SOEs include:

=== Anhui Province ===
- Anhui Conch Cement
- Masteel Group (49%)

=== Beijing Municipality ===
- BAIC Group
- BBMG (44.93%)
- Beijing Guoxiang Asset Management
  - UBS Securities (33%)
- Beijing State-owned Capital Operation and Management
  - Shougang
    - Shougang Company
    - Shougang Concord International
  - CSC Financial (37.46%)

=== Chongqing Municipality ===
- Chongqing Iron and Steel Company

=== Fujian Province ===
- Fujian Motors Group
- Fujian Radio Film and TV Group

=== Gansu Province ===
- Gansu SASAC
  - Baiyin Nonferrous (36.16%)

=== Guangdong Province ===
- Guangdong Radio and Television
- Guangdong Rising Asset Management
  - Zhongjin Lingnan (36.04%)
  - Rising Nonferrous Metals Share
- Guangdong Hengjian Investment Holding (100%)
  - Shaoguan Iron and Steel Group (49%)
- Guangdong Provincial Communication Group
- Guangdong Provincial Railway Construction Investment Group
- Guangdong Holdings
  - Guangdong Investment (54.68%)
- TCL Corporation (36%)
  - Tonly Electronics Holdings Limited (48.70%)

==== Shenzhen City ====
- Shenzhen Capital Group
- Shenzhen HTI Group
- Shenzhen Zhixin New Information Technology Co.
  - Honor

==== Zhuhai City ====
- Gree Group (100%)
  - Gree Electric (sold in 2019)
- Gree Real Estate

=== Guangxi Zhuang Autonomous Region ===
- Guangxi Automobile Group
- Guangxi Non-ferrous Metals

=== Guizhou Province ===
- Kweichow Moutai Group
  - Kweichow Moutai

=== Hainan ===
- Haima Automobile (51%)

=== Hebei Province ===
- Hesteel Group
  - Hesteel Company
  - Hansteel
  - Tangsteel

=== Heilongjiang Province ===
- Beiman Special Steel (41.37%)

=== Hubei Province ===
==== Wuhan City ====
- Wuhan Financial Holdings Group (100%)
  - Founder BEA Trust (67.51%)

=== Jiangsu Province ===
- Jiangsu Broadcasting Corporation
- Jiangsu Guoxin Investment Group
  - Jiangsu Sainty (49.97%)
- Jiangsu High-Tech Investment Group
  - Addor Capital

=== Liaoning Province ===
- Benxi Steel Group
- Brilliance Auto Group
- Dongbei Special Steel
  - Beiman Special Steel
  - Fushun Special Steel (38.58%)

=== Shanghai Municipality ===
- China Pacific Insurance Company (21.33%)
- Greenland Holdings (46.37%)
- SAIC Motor
- Shanghai Airport Authority
- Shanghai Construction Group
- Shanghai Data Exchange
- Shanghai International Port Group
- Shanghai Jiushi Group
- Shanghai Municipal Investment Group
- Shanghai United Media Group
- Shanghai Venture Capital Co.
- Shenergy Group

=== Shandong Province ===
- Shandong Gaosu Group
- Shandong Energy Group

==== Linfen City ====
- Linfen Investment Group (100%)

==== Yantai City ====
As of 2019

- Yantai Guofeng (100%)
  - Wanhua Industrial Group (39.497%)
  - Wanhua Chemical Group (21.56%)

=== Shanxi Province ===
- Datong Coal Mining Group
  - Datong Coal Industry
- Jincheng Anthracite Mining Group
- Jinneng Holding Group
  - Jinneng Holding Equipment Manufacturing Group (62.57%)
- Shanxi Coking Coal Group
  - Shanxi Coking Company
  - Xishan Coal Electricity Group
  - Xishan Coal and Electricity Power
- Taiyuan Coal Gasification Group (51%)

=== Tianjin Municipality ===
- TEDA Holding
  - China Bohai Bank (25%)
  - Tianjin Pipe
  - Tianjin TEDA F.C.
  - Tianjin TEDA Co.
- Tianjin Real Estate Group

=== Xinjiang Uyghur Autonomous Region ===
- Xinjiang Investment Development Group (100%)
  - Xinjiang Ba Yi Iron and Steel Group (15%)

=== Zhejiang Province ===
==== Ningbo City ====
- Bank of Ningbo (21.38%)

=== Hong Kong S.A.R. ===
- Hong Kong Link (100%)
- MTR Corporation (around 75% shares)
- Kowloon–Canton Railway Corporation (100%)

== See also ==
- List of government-owned companies
- Public Sector Undertakings in India (PSU), SOE are called PSU in India
- List of public service commissions in India
