= PKU (disambiguation) =

PKU may refer to:

- Phenylketonuria, a genetic disease
- Peking University (PKU), a public university in Haidian, Beijing, China
- PKU Resources, a Chinese conglomerate
- PKU Healthcare, a Chinese pharmaceutical company
- Pku, an Armenian musical instrument
- Sultan Syarif Kasim II International Airport (IATA code), in Pekanbaru, Riau, Indonesia
- Paku language (Indonesia), a language of Kalimantan, Borneo (ISO 639-3 code: pku)
- Partai Kebangkitan Umat (Ummah Awakening Party); see List of political parties in Indonesia
- A unit of PASKAU, special forces of Malaysia
- Panskura Junction railway station (station code: PKU), West Bengal, India
