= DoubleTree by Hilton Hotel Los Angeles Downtown =

Hotel in Los Angeles, California

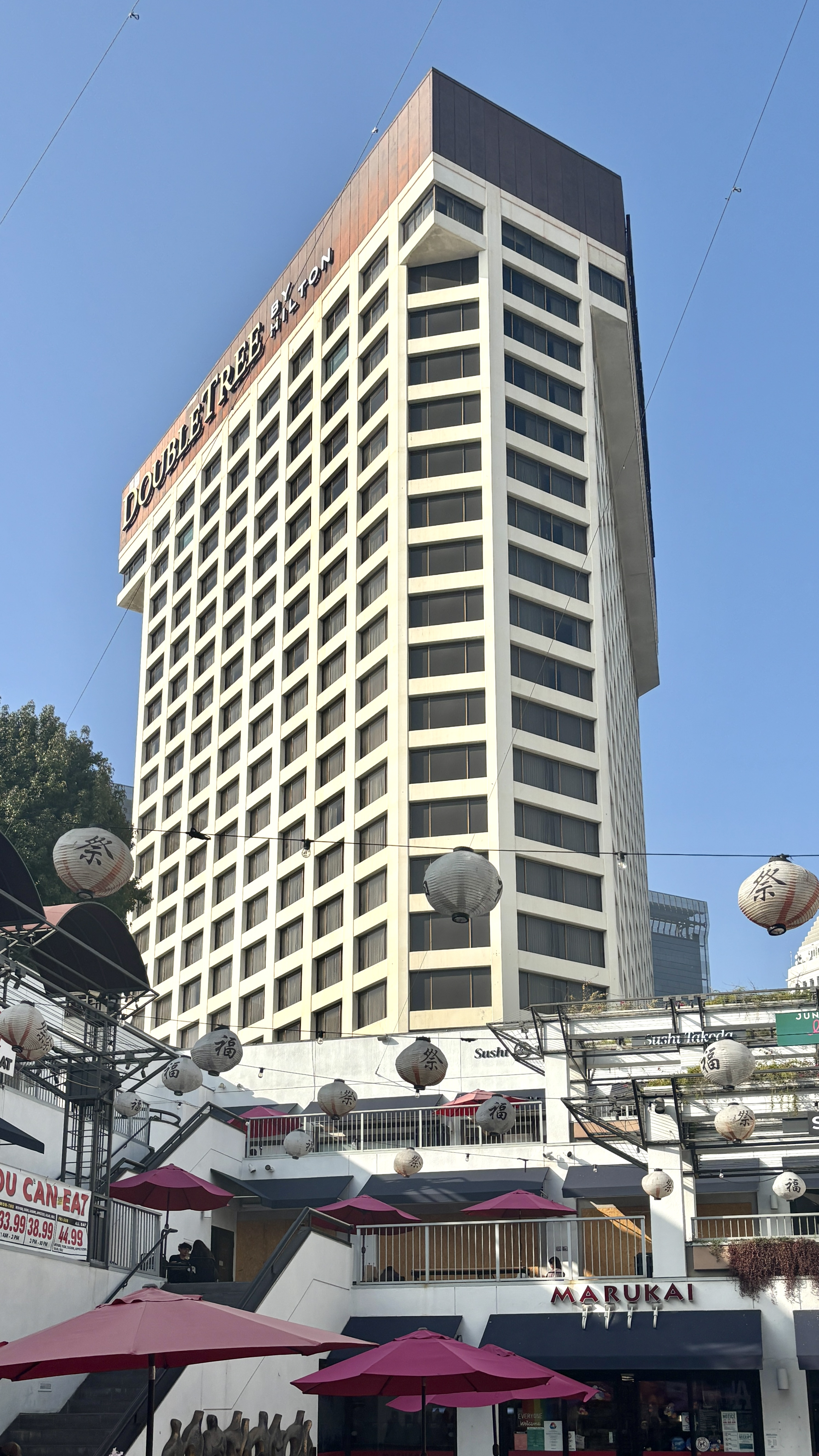
- As DoubleTree by Hilton in 2025
- Interactive map of the DoubleTree by Hilton Hotel Los Angeles Downtown area
- Hotel chain: DoubleTree

General information
- Location: 120 S. Los Angeles St. Los Angeles, California; United States
- Coordinates: 34.0505916°N 118.2426632°W
- Opening: 1977
- Owner: Han’s Group USA
- Management: Aimbridge Hospitality

Technical details
- Floor count: 21

Design and construction
- Architect: Hayahiko Takase
- Developer: Kajima Corporation

Other information
- Number of rooms: 434
- Number of suites: 20
- Number of restaurants: 2
- Parking: valet parking available

Website
- Official site

The DoubleTree by Hilton Hotel Los Angeles Downtown is located in Los Angeles, California, USA. Managed by Aimbridge Hospitality, the hotel is located in the Little Tokyo area of downtown Los Angeles at 120 South Los Angeles Street.

The hotel was constructed by the Tokyo-based Kajima Corporation and designed by Japanese-American architect Hayahiko Takase. It opened in 1977 as the New Otani Hotel & Garden. It was sold to 3D Investments in August 2007, who brought in Crestline Hotels & Resorts to manage the property, which was renamed the Kyoto Grand Hotel and Gardens on November 30, 2007.

Following bankruptcy proceedings, the Kyoto Grand was again rebranded as a DoubleTree by Hilton in July 2012, following renovations. The property again changed in June 2017 as Han’s Group USA purchased the hotel for $115 million US Dollars. Interstate Hotels and Resorts initially held the management contract which has since been acquired by Aimbridge with its employees represented by UNITE HERE local 11.

The Kyoto Grand featured 434 guest rooms on 21 floors with three restaurants: Garden Grill, Thousand Cranes, and the Azalea. Since its rebranding as a DoubleTree, its dining options are currently limited to the Justice Urban Tavern and Rendezvous Lobby Bar.

Popular with Japanese tourists, the hotel is known for its half-acre rooftop garden inspired by an ancient garden in Japan. It is 19 miles (31 km) from Los Angeles International Airport, and 2 miles (3.2 km) from the Los Angeles Convention Center.

In 2011 electronic producer Skrillex named a song on his new EP Bangarang "Kyoto" because he produced the whole song on his notebook in one of the hotel rooms and even recorded the vocals there.
