= Bookmaker (software) =

- Other names: Bookmaker
- Developers: Founder Group (Beijing Founder Electronics Co., Ltd.)
- Release: Before 1994
- Operating system: DOS, Microsoft Windows
- License: Proprietary
- Website: https://www.founderfx.cn/product/102.jhtml

Bookmaker (simplified Chinese: 方正书版; traditional Chinese: 方正書版; pinyin: Fāngzhèng Shūbǎn) is a batch-processing typesetting software developed by Founder Group, first released in the 1990s. It targets publications like books, periodicals, dictionaries, and scientific literature.

== History ==
Major releases of Bookmaker include v6.0 and 7.0, 9.0, 9.01, 9.1, 9.11, 10.0, the 2008 edition, and 11.0. V9.01 introduced automatic pinyin annotation, a large-character font library, and GBK font support. The 2008 edition added annotation and layout parameters.

== Features ==
Bookmaker runs on Microsoft Windows (old versions support DOS), and can import Microsoft Word documents directly. It offers tools for mathematical formula entry, chemical notation, symbol library management, and colored element design. Output formats include PostScript and PDF, as well as Founder's proprietary CEB format.

Unlike WYSIWYG systems, Bookmaker uses batch processing: users write scripts in BD typesetting language (Chinese: BD排版语言) to define layout commands.

Sample files (Chinese: 小样文件, .FBD) contain user-edited text with embedded annotations, while backups (.BAK) are created automatically during processing. The .PRO files store global annotations for the complete publication.

== BD language ==
Commands in BD language are embedded as annotations within sample files.

Examples
Content	Bookmaker BD language	LaTeX	Result
Math expression	🄏🄏ⓏsinⓏ¼(α＋β)🄏🄏	\sin(\alpha + \beta)	$\sin(\alpha + \beta)$

== Limitations ==
- Full-width single and double quotation marks from Word documents may convert to half-width in Bookmaker 10.0; this can be worked around by re-pasting through Windows Notepad or WordPad.
