= Addor =

Addor is a surname. Notable people with the surname include:

- Eugene Addor, Swiss sports shooter
- Jean-Luc Addor (born 1964), Swiss-Italian lawyer and politician

== Other ==
- Addor Capital, Chinese investment firm
