= Jiangsu Sainty =

Jiangsu Sainty may refer to:

- Jiangsu Sainty International Group, parent company of the football club and the listed company, now an intermediate holding company of Jiangsu Guoxin Investment Group
  - Jiangsu F.C., formerly known as Jiangsu Sainty F.C., Chinese football club based in Nanjing
  - Jiangsu Sainty (company), Chinese listed clothing company based in Nanjing
