= Zhu Jianghong =

Chinese businessman (born 1945)

- 朱江洪
- Born: November 1945 (age 80); Zhongshan County, Guangdong, China
- Education: South China University of Technology
- Occupation: Businessman
- Title: Chairman of the board of Gree Electric
- Term: April 2001–May 2012
- Predecessor: New title
- Successor: Dong Mingzhu

Chinese name
- Chinese: 朱江洪
Transcriptions
Standard Mandarin
- Hanyu Pinyin: Zhū Jiānghóng
Yue: Cantonese
- Jyutping: zyu^{1} gong^{1}hung^{4}

Zhu Jianghong (Chinese: 朱江洪; born November 1945) is a Chinese businessman who served as chairman of the board of Gree Electric between April 2001 and May 2012. He is a visiting professor at South China University of Technology and Northwest University. Zhu has been hailed as "Father of Gree".

== Early life and education ==
Zhu was born in Zhongshan County, Guangdong, in November 1945, during the Chinese Civil War, while his ancestral home in Xinhui District of Jiangmen, Guangdong. In 1970, he graduated from South China University of Technology, where he majored in machinery.

== Career ==
After university, he was assigned to Baise Mining Machinery Factory (百色矿山机械厂) in Guangxi. A few years later, he was promoted to director of the factory. In 1988, he returned to his homeland, Zhuhai, becoming the general manager of the Guanxiong Rubber Company (冠雄塑胶公司) and the director of Zhuhai Air-Conditional Factory successively. When the Gree Electrical Equipment Company (formerly Zhuhai City Haili Cooling Engineering Company Limited) was created in 1992, Zhu took over the position of the company's general manager. He transformed the small factory with an annual production of only 20 thousand are-conditioned appliances into a sector giant with the annual production of 2.5 million units. In April 2001 he became chairman of the board of Gree Electric, and held that office until May 2012. In 1999 he was proposed as vice president of the China Household Electrical Appliances Association (CHEAA).

== Awards ==
- 1997 May 1 Labor Medal
- 2000 Title of "National Model Worker"

Business positions
New title	Chairman of the board of Gree Electric; 2001–2012	Succeeded by Dong Mingzhu
