= Gree Group =

Chinese state-owned enterprise

Zhuhai GREE Group Co., Ltd.
- Formerly: Zhuhai Gree Group Corporation
- Company type: State-owned enterprise
- Industry: Conglomerate
- Founded: 28 March 1985; 41 years ago (predecessor); 15 December 1990; 35 years ago (as Gree Group)
- Founder: Zhuhai Government
- Headquarters: Zhuhai, China
- Key people: Zhou Lewei (Chairman & Party Committee Secretary)
- Services: Airline (via joint venture)
- Revenue: ▲CN¥202.194 billion (2018)
- Net income: ▲CN¥4.543 billion (2018)
- Total assets: ▲CN¥261.436 billion (2018)
- Total equity: ▲CN¥23.773 billion (2018)
- Owner: Zhuhai Government (100%)
- Parent: Zhuhai SASAC
- Website: gree.cn
- Footnotes / references in a consolidated financial statement, in Chinese Accounting Standards

Gree Group
- Simplified Chinese: 珠海格力集团有限公司
- Traditional Chinese: 珠海格力集團有限公司
- Literal meaning: Zhuhai Gree Group Limited Company
Transcriptions

Chinese short name
- Simplified Chinese: 格力集团
- Traditional Chinese: 格力集團
Transcriptions

Zhuhai GREE Group Co., Ltd. is a Chinese state-owned enterprise based in Zhuhai, Guangdong Province. The enterprise was owned and supervised by the State-owned Assets Supervision and Administration Commission (SASAC) of the Zhuhai Municipal People's Government.

GREE Group was the parent company of publicly traded companies GREE Electric and GREE Real Estate before they were transferred in the late 2010s.

== History ==
GREE Group was an investment vehicle of Zhuhai local government, which GREE Electric and GREE Real Estate were the notable assets of the company. However, in the past, multiple managers of the company were arrested for corruption.

The stake of GREE Real Estate that held by the group was transferred to another entity of Zhuhai Municipal People's Government in mid-2015 (along with others assets, such as a management company of Zhuhai checkpoint of Hong Kong–Zhuhai–Macau Bridge). As at 31 December 2015, GREE Group owned just 18.22% stake of GREE Electric, but able to control their board of directors by nominating them for election. GREE Group and GREE Electric also shared the same chairwoman Dong Mingzhu until November 2016. She was replaced by Zhou Lewei (周乐伟). Zhou also became the Party Committee Secretary of the group, replacing Meng Xiangkai (孟祥凯).

In December 2019, the group sold 15% shares of GREE Electric to a private equity fund for CN¥41.7 billion, only retaining 3.22%. The private equity fund became the largest shareholder of GREE Electric.

== Subsidiaries ==
=== Current ===
- Zhuhai Gree Electric Appliances Co., Ltd.
- Zhuhai Gree New Technology Development Co., Ltd.
  - Zhuhai Gree Meida Technology Co., Ltd.
  - Zhuhai Ruideli Biotechnology Co., Ltd.
  - Zhuhai Gree New Energy Technology Co., Ltd.
- Zhuhai Jianan Group Co., Ltd.
- Zhuhai Gree Island Investment Co., Ltd.
- Zhuhai Gree Real Estate Co., Ltd.
  - Zhuhai Gree Property Management Co., Ltd.
  - Zhuhai Wangjiao Department Store Development Co., Ltd.
- Zhuhai Gree Financial Investment Management Co., Ltd.
- Zhuhai Gree Construction Investment Co., Ltd.
- Zhuhai Xingge Investment Co., Ltd.

=== Former ===
- GREE Electric
- GREE Real Estate

== Joint ventures ==
former

- Zhuhai Airlines
