= Sinobioway Group =

Chinese biotechnology company

- Type: private
- Industry: Bio-technology
- Founded: 19 October 1992; 33 years ago
- Headquarters: PKU Biological Industry Park, Beijing, China
- Area served: China
Key people
Pan Aihua	(Chairman)
Yang Xiaomin	(President)
Luo Deshun	(Vice-President)
Zhao Furong	(Vice-President)
Wang Jun	(Vice-President)
- Parent: Hainan Tiandao Investment
- Website: www.sinobioway.com

Sinobioway Group Co., Ltd.
- Simplified Chinese: 北京北大未名生物工程集团有限公司
- Traditional Chinese: 北京北大未名生物工程集團有限公司
- Literal meaning: Beijing Peking University Anonymous Bio-engineering Group Limited Company
Transcriptions

Sinobioway Group
- Simplified Chinese: 未名集团
- Traditional Chinese: 未名集團
- Literal meaning: Anonymous Group
Transcriptions
Standard Mandarin
- Hanyu Pinyin: Wèimíng jítuán

Sinobioway Group Co., Ltd. (Chinese: Wèimíng Jítuán) is a Chinese company that is focused on pharmaceutical, agriculture, environment management and other bio-technology industries. It is a university-owned enterprises that was launched by Peking University in Beijing. As of 2023, the company was majority (60%) owned by a Peking University professor and other employee of Peking University.

== History ==
Sinobioway Group was incorporated on 19 October 1992 as a university-owned enterprises. The others were Founder Group, Jade Bird Software and Peking University Science Park. The pinyin of the Chinese short name Wèimíng Jítuán literally means Anonymous Group (or Unnamed Group). However, Sinobioway was not related to other Weiming Group, such as Weiming Investment Group.

== Equity investments ==
Sinobioway Group is the largest shareholder of Sinobioway Medicine (SZSE: 002581) for 26.38% (as at 30 June 2016). Sinobioway Medicine was involved in the delisting of Sinovac Biotech. Sinobioway Medicine, full name "Shandong Sinobioway Medicine Co., Ltd." (formerly known as Wanchang Science & Technology), acquired "Sinobioway Medicine Co., Ltd." as part of a backdoor listing in 2015.

Sinobioway Group also owned 60% stake of an intermediate holding company (Chinese: 深圳市北大高科技投资) which was the largest shareholder of PKU Hi-tech (SZSE: 000004, now known as CAU Technology) for 37.94% shares. In 2005 the stake in the intermediate company were under auction by court ruling, in order to refurbish the debt of Sinobioway Group. It was acquired by a subsidiary of China Agricultural University.

== Subsidiaries ==
As of 31 December 2015

- Sinobioway Agriculture (92%)
- Hunan PKU Sinobioway Bio-tech (53.57%)
- Anhui Sinobioway Bio-economy Group (74%)

== Shareholders ==
Sinobioway Group is 60% owned by an intermediate holding company Hainan Tiandao Investment (Chinese: 海南天道投资) that was owned 83.38% by Pan Aihua (Chinese: 潘爱华), a Peking University professor and chairman of the group; Yang Xiaomin (Chinese: 杨晓敏), the president for 8.80% stake, Luo Deshun (Chinese: 罗德顺), the vice-president (and former staff of PKU in student affairs) for 3.94% stake and Zhao Furong (Chinese: 赵芙蓉), the vice-president (and former auditor of PKU) for 3.88% stake. Another vice-president of the group, Wang Jun (Chinese: 王军), did not own any stake in the company. However, according to the National Enterprise Credit Information Publicity System, the stake of Sinobioway Group were pledged in full or in part several times by the intermediate holding and Zhao Furong, in October 2012 (by Zhao personally), December 2014, June 2015, November 2015 and December 2016, to Chengdu Haizhen Investment (twice, Chinese: 成都海真投资), Guoyuan Trust (Chinese: 国元信托), Shenzhen Central Yunnan Commercial Factoring (Chinese: 深圳滇中商业保理) and 1314 Fund (Chinese: 北京恒宇天泽投资管理).

The second largest shareholder of Sinobioway Group was the Peking University for 40% stake.

In the past Zhao Furong owned 30% personally as the joint-second largest shareholder of Sinobioway Group (behind the Peking University which owned 40%) in 2005.
