= Founder BEA Trust =

Chinese trust company

- Formerly: Wuhan International Trust and Investment Corporation
- Type: subsidiary
- Industry: Financial services
- Headquarters: Wuhan, China
- Owner: Wuhan Government (67.51%); Bank of East Asia (19.99%); Founder Group (12.5%)

Founder BEA Trust Co., Ltd.
- Simplified Chinese: 方正东亚信托有限责任公司
- Traditional Chinese: 方正東亞信託有限責任公司
Transcriptions

Founder BEA Trust Co., Ltd. is a Chinese trust company, formerly known as Wuhan International Trust and Investment Corporation (WITIC; Chinese: 武汉国际信托投资公司). Founder BEA Trust was a subsidiary of Founder Group for 70.01% stake, with Bank of East Asia owned 19.99%. The third largest shareholder was Wuhan Financial Holdings Group, a company owned by Wuhan Municipal People's Government, for 10% stake. However, in 2016 Wuhan Financial Holdings Group acquired 57.51% stake from Founder Group. An additional 12.5% stake sold by Founder Group to their associate company China Hi-Tech Group (SSE: 600730) was still pending the approval from China Banking Regulatory Commission, according to the third quarterly report of China Hi-Tech Group in 2016.

It was set up in the 1980s by the Chinese government to function as the largest investment bank in Central China.

== Location ==
WITIC's headquarter is located in Wuhan, where it attracted foreign investment for the heavily industrial cities in the area. With much autonomy, but still under the supervision of the China International Trust and Investment Corporation in Beijing (CITIC), WITIC brought major foreign investments to Wuhan Iron and Steel Corporation and Dongfeng Motor Corporation. WITIC survived the crash of Guangdong International Trust and Investment Corp. (GITIC) in 1998 and severe liquidity problem that followed, which bankrupted most of the ITICs in China. However, in the light of the more decentralized approach by the Chinese government, WITIC has in recent years broken up into several companies that specialize in brokerage, investment, and accounting.
