= Wang Xun (physicist) =

Chinese physicist (1934–2025)

- 王迅
- Born: 23 April 1934; Shanghai, China
- Died: 5 December 2025 (aged 91); Shanghai, China
- Education: Fudan University
- Scientific career
- Fields: Semiconductor
- Workplaces: Fudan University
- Academic advisors: Xie Xide

Chinese name
- Simplified Chinese: 王迅
- Traditional Chinese: 王迅
Transcriptions
Standard Mandarin
- Hanyu Pinyin: Wáng Xùn

Wang Xun (Chinese: 王迅; 23 April 1934 – 5 December 2025) was a Chinese physicist and professor at Fudan University, and an academician of the Chinese Academy of Sciences. He was a member of the Chinese Communist Party (CCP).

== Life and career ==
Wang was born into a distinguished intellectual family on 23 April 1934, in Shanghai, with his ancestral home in Wuxi, Jiangsu, to Wang Shouqi, a graduate of National Jiaotong University (now Shanghai Jiao Tong University), and Zhou Miaoqing. He was a descendant of Wang Zai, who was a politician during the late Qing dynasty (1644–1911). He had four siblings, two brothers and two sisters. His elder sister, Wang Jian, was admitted to the pre-medical program of Yenching University in 1947 and later studied at Peking Union Medical College and worked at the General Hospital of Nanjing Military Region after graduation. His eldest brother, Wang Yu, graduated from the Department of Electrical Engineering of National Jiaotong University and later taught at Datong Coal Mining School and the Beijing Coal Mining Cadre Management College. His younger sister, Wang Jun, enrolled at the Department of Physics at Fudan University and was engaged in work related to nuclear physics. His youngest brother, Wang Xuan, was an academician of both the Chinese Academy of Sciences and the Chinese Academy of Engineering (CAE).

Xun attended Shanghai Nanyang Model High School. In 1952, he entered the Department of Physics at Fudan University, earning his bachelor's degree in 1956. He continued his graduate studies at Fudan under the supervision of the renowned physicist Xie Xide, graduating in 1960 and subsequently joining the faculty.

Wang's research career was centered at Fudan University, where he dedicated over six decades. He was promoted to associate professor in May 1978 and to full professor in August 1984. From March to November 1980, he was a visiting professor at the University of Wisconsin Milwaukee in the United States. He held several key leadership positions, including director of the Surface Physics Laboratory and the founding director of the State Key Laboratory of Applied Surface Physics, which he helped establish with Xie Xide in 1992.

On 5 December 2025, Wang died in Shanghai at the age of 91.

== Honours and awards ==
- 1999 Member of the Chinese Academy of Sciences (CAS)
- 2002 State Natural Science Award (First Class) for the research on the development, physical properties, and preparation of new devices of silicon based low dimensional structural materials.
