= Wanjiang Subdistrict =

Coordinates: 23.0446°N 113.7418°E

Wanjiang 万江街道
- Subdistrict
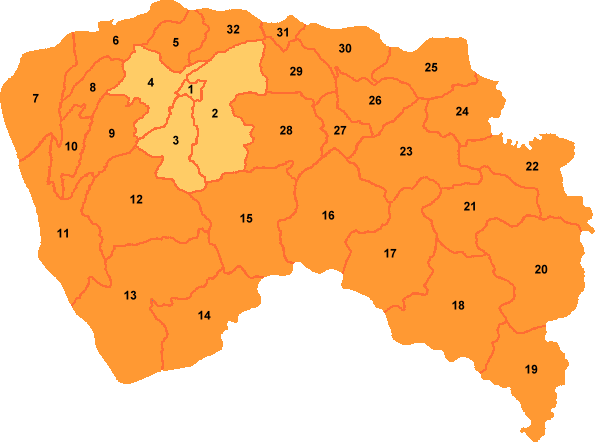
- Wanjiang Subdistrict is labelled "4" on this map of Dongguan
- Country: People's Republic of China
- Province: Guangdong
- Prefecture-level city: Dongguan
- Time zone: UTC+8 (China Standard)

Wanjiang Subdistrict (Chinese: 万江街道; pinyin: Wànjiāng Jiēdào; Jyutping: maan^{6}gong^{1} gaai^{1} dou^{6}) is a subdistrict of the city of Dongguan, Guangdong Province, China.

== Economy ==
The world's largest shopping mall, New South China Mall is located in Wanjiang.
