= Beida Jade Bird Universal Sci-Tech =

Chinese manufacturing company

Beijing Beida Jade Bird Universal Sci-Tech
- Company type: public
Traded as
SEHK: 8095	(H share)
unlisted	(A share)
- ISIN: CNE100000551
- Industry: Manufacturing, Tourism
- Founded: 29 March 2000
- Founder: Jade Bird Software consortium
- Headquarters: 3/F Beida Jade Bird Building, Beijing, China
- Area served: mainland China
- Products: electronic fire equipment
- Services: Software, tourism
- Revenue: ▲CN¥1.072 billion (2015)
- Operating income: ▲CN¥284.2 million (2015)
- Net income: ▼CN¥76.0 million (2015)
- Total assets: ▲CN¥2.279 billion (2015)
- Total equity: ▲CN¥1.293 billion (2015)
Owner
Jade Bird Software consortium	(24.05%)
Jade Bird Software employee	(17.34%)
Grand East (H.K.)	( 9.28%)
Mongolia Energy	( 7.14%)
AR Asia Special Strategies Fund	( 4.22%)
others/free-floats	(37.97%)
- Website: jbu.com.cn
- Footnotes / references in a consolidated basis, excluding minority interest

Beijing Beida Jade Bird Universal Sci-Tech Co., Ltd.
- Simplified Chinese: 北京北大青鸟环宇科技股份有限公司
- Traditional Chinese: 北京北大青鳥環宇科技股份有限公司
Transcriptions
Standard Mandarin
- Hanyu Pinyin: Běijīng běidà qīngniǎo huányǔ kējì gǔfèn yǒuxiàn gōngsī

Jade Bird Universal
- Simplified Chinese: 青鸟环宇
- Traditional Chinese: 青鳥環宇
Transcriptions
Standard Mandarin
- Hanyu Pinyin: qīngniǎo huányǔ

Beijing Beida Jade Bird Universal Sci-Tech Co., Ltd. known as Jade Bird Universal is a Chinese listed company. It manufactured electronic fire equipment, as well involved in tourism industry and other equity investments. The largest shareholder of Jade Bird Universal is the non-wholly-owned subsidiaries of Peking University.

Jade Bird Universal was a former constituent of Hang Seng China Enterprises Index from 10 August 2000 to 3 October 2001.

== Name ==
Beida Jade Bird Universal Sci-Tech, known as Jade Bird Universal (pinyin: qīngniǎo huányǔ) once had an intermediate parent company "Beijing Beida Yuhuan Microelectronic System Engineering" (Chinese: 北京市北大宇环微电子系统工程). Yuhuan (Chinese: 宇环) and Huanyu (Chinese: 环宇) literally a word play of the Chinese word Universal (Chinese: 环宇). Like other sister companies, they all bear the brand "Beida Jade Bird", "Jade Bird", "PKU Jade Bird" or "Peking University Jade Bird".

== History ==
Beijing Beida Jade Bird Universal Sci-Tech Co., Ltd. was incorporated on 29 March 2000. In the same year the company was registered in Hong Kong as a foreign company. Before initial public offering, the share capital (70 million number of shares of CN¥1 each) were owned by a subsidiary of Heng Huat Investments (employee ownership of Jade Bird Software) for 31.43% shares, Jade Bird Software subsidiaries (Beijing Jade Bird, Jade Bird Software System, Beida Yuhuan Microelectronic System Engineering) for 33.57% shares, Beijing Tianqiao Beida Beida Jade Bird Sci-Tech (SSE: 600657), an associate company of Jade Bird Software for 10.71%, Mongolia Energy Corporation (formerly known as New World Cyberbase) for 10.00%, a private equity fund AR Asia Special Strategies Fund for 7.14%, as well as private investors Dragon Air Investments (NOT related to Dragonair) and Hinet (NOT related to Chunghwa Telecom) for 4.29% and 2.86% respectively. The IPO issued at first 24 million H shares for HK$11 each.

As of 31 December 2015 the H shares had expanded to 484.8 million with CN¥0.1 each in par value.

== Subsidiaries ==
As of 31 December 2015

- Beida Jade Bird Universal Sci-Tech (Cayman) Development (100%)
- Beida Jade Bird Universal Fire Alarm Device (51%)
- Beijing Jade Bird Universal Fire System Software Service (51%)
- Chuanqi Tourism Investment (60%)
- Hengsheng Investment Management (55%)
- Si Chuan Jiu Yuan Intelligent Surveillance (38%)
- PWC Winery (75%)

== Shareholders ==
Peking University via various subsidiaries, owned 24.05% shares in total as the largest shareholder as at 31 December 2015: 9.71% shares were held by Beijing Beida Jade Bird directly; Beijing Beida Jade Bird itself was 46% owned by Jade Bird Software; Jade Bird Software itself was 48% owned by Peking University. An additional 7.17% shares were held by Shenzhen Beida Jade Bird Sei-Tech, a subsidiary (90%) of Beijing Beida Jade Bird; an additional 7.17% shares were held by another indirect subsidiary (46%) of Jade Bird Software: Haikou Jade Bird Yuanwang Sci-Tech Development; the shares held by "Jade Bird Shenzhen" would be transferred to "Jade Bird Haikou".

The second largest shareholder was Heng Huat Investments for 17.34% shares (a company for employee-ownership); it was followed by "Grand East (H.K.)" (Chinese: 怡興(香港)) for 9.28%, Mongolia Energy Corporation for 7.14% and AR Asia Special Strategies Fund (via subsidiary Asian Technology Investment) for 4.22%.
