= China Hi-Tech Group Co., Ltd. =

Chinese educational technology company

- Native name: 中国高科集团股份有限公司
- Company type: Public
- Traded as: SSE: 600730
- Industry: Investment; Trade; Consultancy
- Founded: 1987; 39 years ago
- Founder: Mǎ Jiàn Bīn
- Headquarters: Beijing, China
- Area served: Worldwide
- Key people: Mǎ Jiàn Bīn (Deputy Chairman of the Board, CEO)
- Revenue: ▲CN¥7.64 billion US$1.64 billion (2017)
- Operating income: ▲CN¥0.35 billion US$0.04 billion (2017)
- Net income: ▲CN¥0.49 billion US$0.06 billion (2017)
- Total assets: ▲CN¥2.89 billion US$0.45 billion (2017)
- Total equity: ▲CN¥5.86 billion US$0.75 billion (2017)
- Owner: Founder Group
- Number of employees: c. 80,000 (2017)

China Hi-Tech Group Co., Ltd.
- Simplified Chinese: 中国高科集团股份有限公司
- Traditional Chinese: 中國高科集團股份有限公司
Transcriptions
Standard Mandarin
- Hanyu Pinyin: zhōng guó gāo kē jí tuán gǔ fèn yǒu xiàn gōng sī

China Hi-Tech Group Co., Ltd. (Chinese: 中国高科集团股份有限公司; pinyin: zhōng guó gāo kē jí tuán gǔ fèn yǒu xiàn gōng sī), is a Chinese company engaged in the provision of educational technology. It was established by a number of Chinese universities and the Chinese Ministry of Education. It is closely held by the Chinese government through Founder Group.

== Distinction ==
China Hi-Tech Group Co. Ltd is different from China Hi-Tech Fund (深圳市高交创业投资管理有限公司), which is an unrelated private equity fund in Shenzhen China.

== History ==
On 26 June 1992, China Hi-Tech Group Co., Ltd., initiated by 36 colleges and universities in China, was established at Pudong, Shanghai.

In January 1993, the State Education Commission of the PRC approved the establishment of the Group through raising funds from targeted sources, and a total of 174 higher education institutions and entities became shareholders.

In April 1993, according to the Document of HTG (92) No. 129 and the Document of HFJW (92) No. 356, China Hi-Tech (Group) Corporation was restructured into China Hi-Tech Group Co. Ltd. through raising funds from targeted sources.

On 27 June 1996, upon the approval from the documents of ZJFSZ (1996) No. 120 and No. 121 by the China Securities Regulatory Commission, China Hi-Tech Group issued A shares of domestic listing to the public. It issued 25,500,000 equity shares at an issue price of 4.8 yuan per share on Shanghai Stock Exchange on 8 July 1996.

On 26 July 1996, China Hi-Tech Group (abbr. China Hi-Tech) was officially listed on the Shanghai Stock Exchange.

In 2003, China Hi-Tech Group established a postdoctoral research station.

In 2011, the Ministry of Education of the People's Republic of China became the controlling shareholder of the group. In 2013, the domicile and office of the group moved to Beijing. In 2015, the group set education as one core business for future development.

In 2017, the Group acquired education and training provider Yingteng Education (SEHK: 838505).
