= South China Mall =

Shopping mall in Dongguan, China

Coordinates: 23°2′15″N 113°43′14″E

South China Mall 华南Mall
- Location: No. 10 Wanjiang Rd, Wanjiang Subdistrict, Dongguan, Guangdong, China
- Opened: 2005
- Owner: Founder Group
- Floor area: 659,611 m^{2} (7.1 million sq ft)

South China Mall (Chinese: 华南Mall; pinyin: Huá nán) in Dongguan, China (formerly New South China Mall) is the fifth largest shopping mall in the world in both gross leasable area and total area.

South China Mall opened in 2005. For more than 10 years, it was mostly vacant as few merchants ever signed up, leading it to be dubbed a dead mall. In 2015, a CNN story reported that large parts of the mall were "full of shops, restaurants and entertainment venues" after extensive renovations and remodeling, though large portions of the mall still remained vacant. But CNN also added that most of the unoccupied units, in addition to halls and walkways, were still under renovation.

According to an article published in January 2018, after more than a decade of high vacancy, most retail spaces were expected to be filled soon after renovations and updates to the space. The mall features an IMAX cinema, theme park, and marine mammal park. In 2020, China Times reported that the occupancy rate was 91%, projected to increase to 98% the following year. However, footage from 2024 reveals large vacant areas, especially on the upper floors.

== Development ==
The mall was built on former farmlands in the Wanjiang District of Dongguan in southern coastal China. The project was spearheaded by Hu Guirong (Alex Hu), who became a billionaire in the instant noodle industry. Upon opening, South China Mall became the largest mall in the world, surpassing the Golden Resources Mall. The cost of its construction is estimated around $1.3 billion.

The mall was owned by Dongguan Sanyuan Yinghui Investment & Development (东莞市三元盈晖投资发展有限公司), Hu Guirong's company, but a controlling interest in the mall was later sold to Founder Group, a division of Peking University.

== History ==
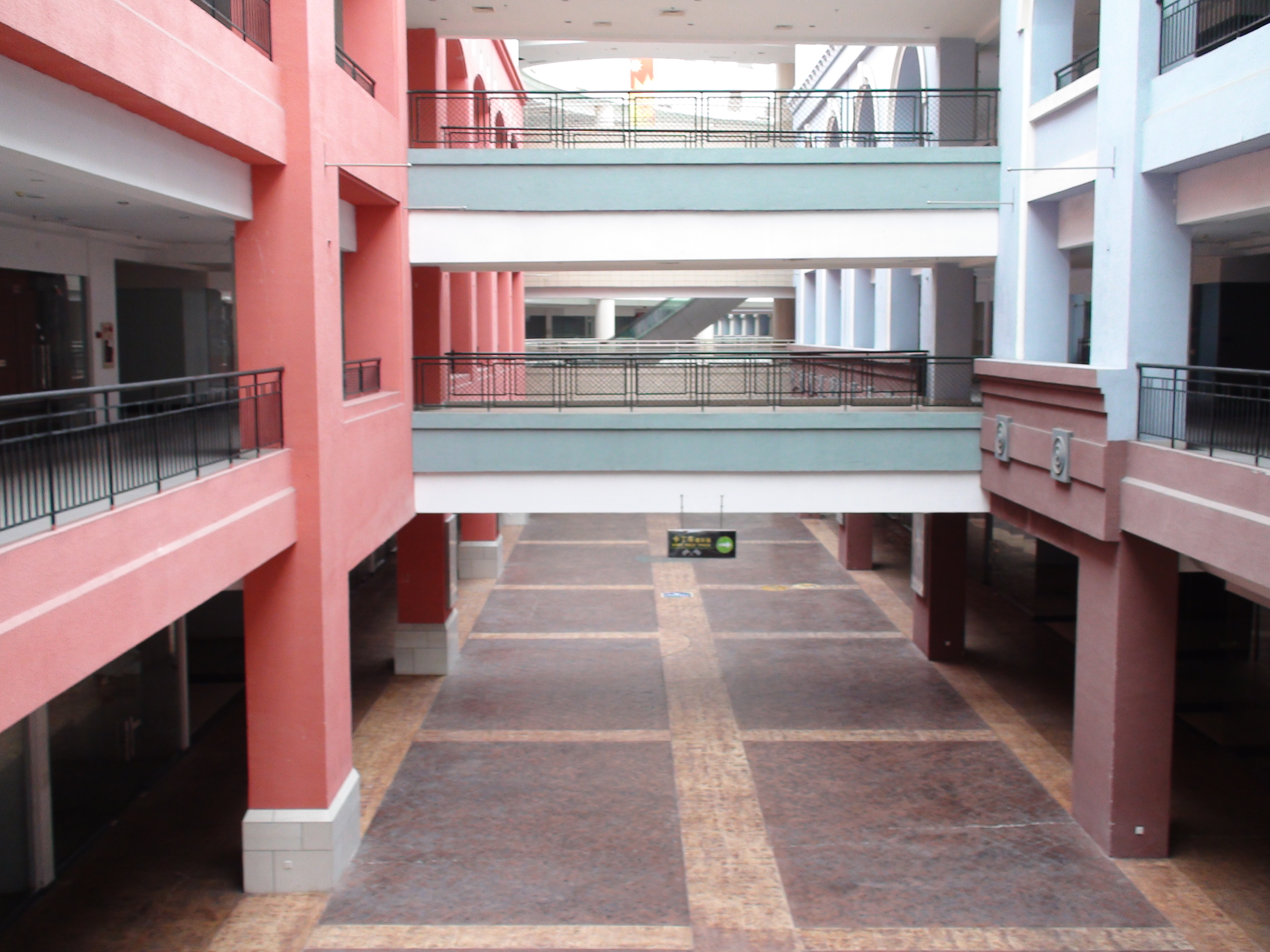
Empty walkways in the mall, February 2010

After opening in 2005, the mall suffered from a severe lack of occupants. Targeted initially to an affluent market (the big cities of Guangzhou and Shenzhen are adjacent), Dongguan is itself mainly a city of low income migrant laborers who failed to respond to all the attractions the mall had to offer. Much of the retail space remained empty, with over 99% of the stores still vacant in 2008. The only occupied areas were near the entrance where several Western fast food chains are located and a parking structure re-purposed as a kart racing track. A planned Shangri-La Hotel was not completed.

Filmmaker Sam Green made a short film about the South China Mall called Utopia Part 3: the World's Largest Shopping Mall which premiered at the 2009 Sundance Film Festival and was broadcast on PBS's documentary series POV.

Originally called "South China Mall", the centre was redubbed as "New South China Mall, Living City" in September 2007. The 2007 makeover was orchestrated by Founder Group, which took over the property from the original owner Hu Guirong in December 2006.

In 2013, Vagabond Journey writer Wade Shepard wrote about his recent visit to the mall. He acknowledged that most visitors attend the mall for its movie theaters featuring IMAX, and that families did gather in the play area. He also noticed that 4 full floors of the mall were unused, and that the water of the artificial indoor canals had turned green.

In May 2019, renovation work began that aimed to target the mall more towards middle-class shoppers. In response to the decline in big-box retail, like many other malls in China, the space has pivoted to incorporate more experience-based entertainment. The central square of the park was updated with new greenery and lighting and a marine park called Sea Cube. New social venues such as night markets with food stalls have been installed, and the mall's popularity is reportedly increasing. As of 2020, the occupancy rate of the mall was 91%, which was partly due to the impact of the COVID-19 pandemic; occupancy was projected to recover to 98% the following year.

By 2024 the theme park had closed and some upper floors were still under construction.

== Description ==
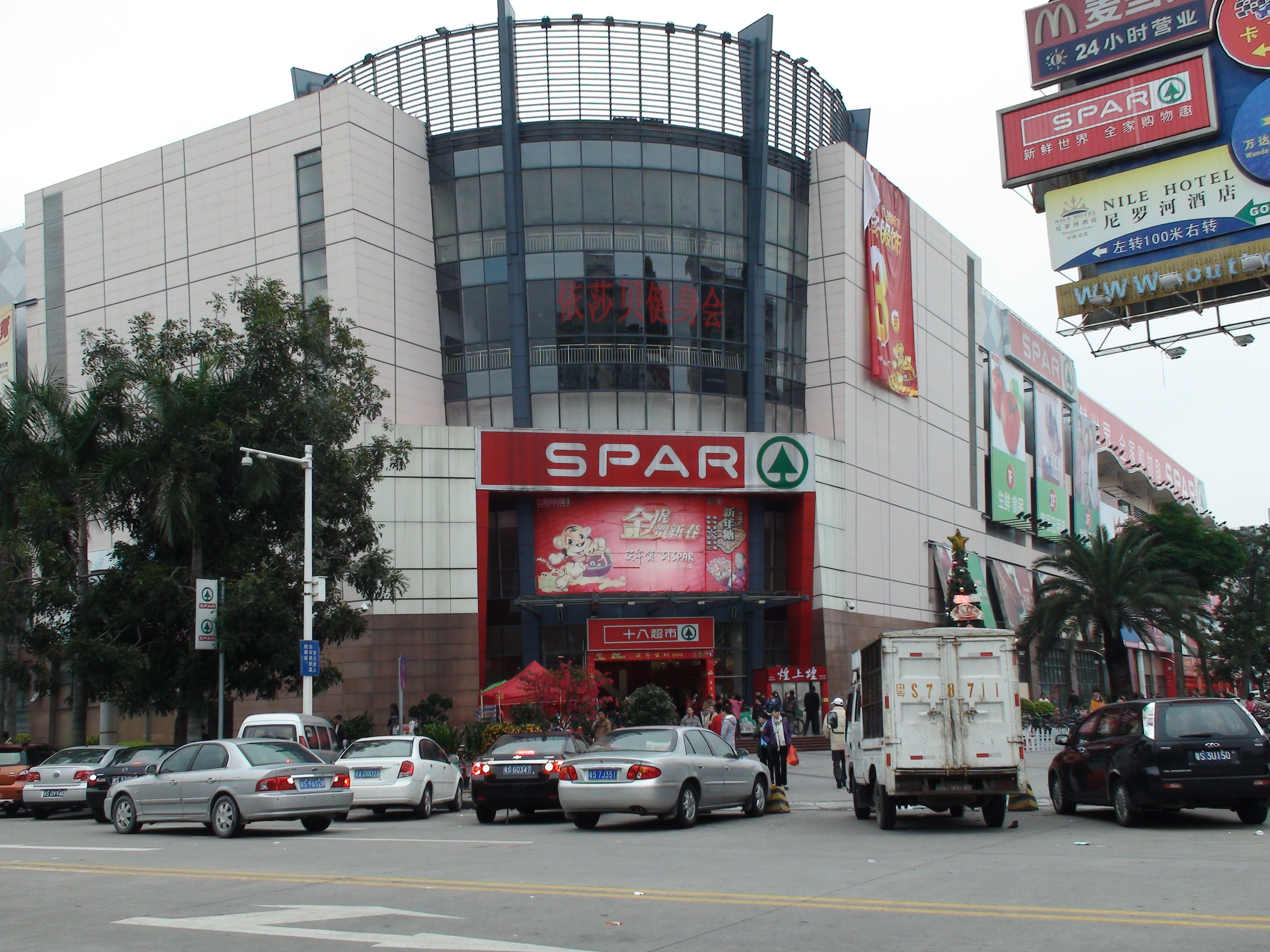
SPAR Hypermarket at New South China Mall

Its total area is 892,000 square metres (9,600,000 ft^{2}), with almost 660,000 square metres (7,100,000 sq ft) of leasable space sufficient for as many as 2,350 stores.

The mall has seven zones modeled on international cities, nations and regions, including Amsterdam, Paris, Rome, Venice, Egypt, the Caribbean, and California. Features include a 25-metre (82 ft) replica of the Arc de Triomphe, a replica of Venice's St Mark's bell tower, a 2.1-kilometre (1.3 mi) canal with gondolas.

== See also ==
- List of the world's largest shopping malls
- List of shopping malls in China
