= Shenzhen HTI Group =

Shenzhen Financial Services Company

Shenzhen High-tech Investment Group Co.，Ltd
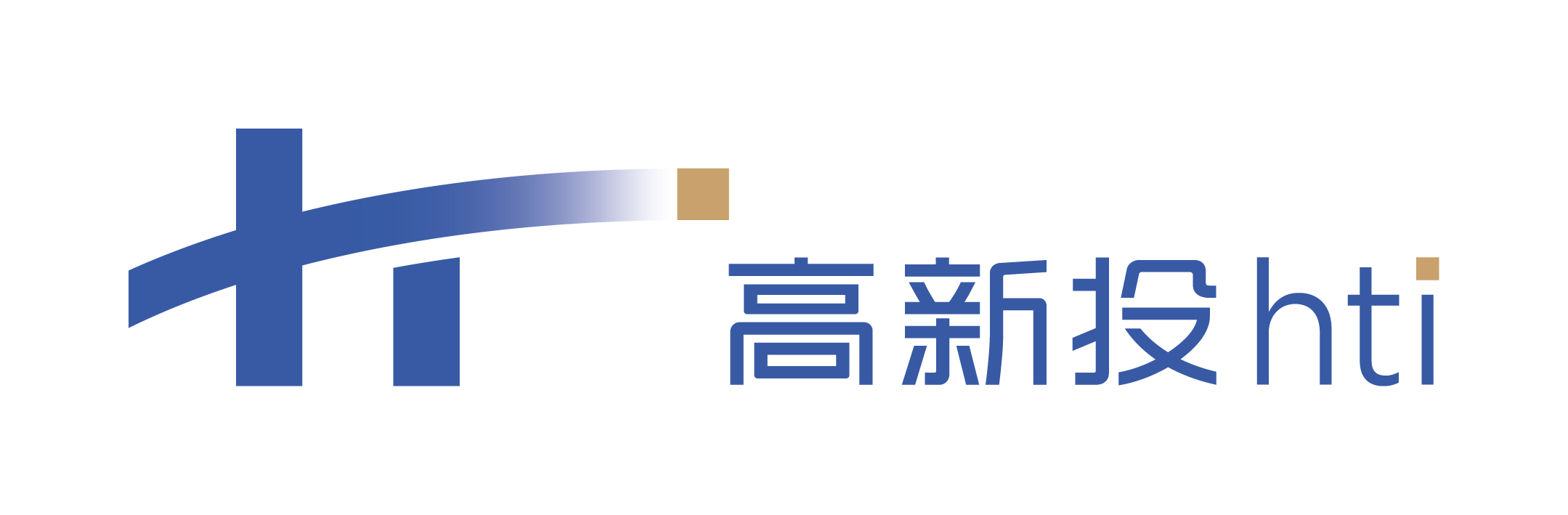
- Native name: 深圳市高新投集团有限公司
- Company type: State-owned enterprise
- Industry: Financial services
- Founded: 29 December 1994; 31 years ago
- Headquarters: Shenzhen, Guangdong, China
- Key people: Liu Suhua (Chairman); Zhang Zhonghua (President)
- Products: Loan guarantee Venture Capital; Direct lending Credit enhancement
- AUM: US$ 6.5 billion (December 2023)
- Website: www.szhti.com.cn

Shenzhen HTI Group (also known as SZHTI, Shenzhen HTI, Shenzhen High-tech Investment Group and Shenzhen Gaoxin Investment Group) (Chinese: 深圳市高新投集团有限公司; pinyin: Shēnzhènshì gāoxīntóujítuán yǒuxiàngōngsī) is a state-owned financial services company based in Shenzhen, China. It was set up by the Shenzhen Municipal Government to provide financing to companies.

Credit rating agencies of China have assigned it the highest corporate credit rating of AAA.

In 2016, China International Capital Corporation ranked it as China's fourth-largest guarantee companies by outstanding bonds and loans backed.

== Background ==
SZHTI was established on 29 December 1994, with a registered capital of RMB 1.2 billion by the Shenzhen Municipal Government. It was originally established to solve the difficulty of financing Small and medium-sized enterprises (SMEs) in the technology sector.

SZHTI started as a guarantor of projects with government policy support and positioned itself as a "bearer and extender" of government policies. It determined since in worked on government policy supported projects, it would be easier to obtain funding from state-owned commercial banks for the companies it planned to guarantee. Since its inception, SZHTI has acted as guarantor for over 1000 companies.

While SZHTI's primary business line providing financial guarantee services for high tech SMEs, it has expanded into other business lines such as venture capital, direct lending, credit enhancement and other financial advisory services.

SZHTI has engaged in the Securitization of IP rights and in 2019, SZHTI issued China's first IP-related asset-backed security product with underlying assets of creditor's rights on small-sum loans.

In 2022, SZHTI established an online fundraising platform to provide loans without the traditional collateral requirements.

== Notable investments ==
Notable companies that SZHTI has supported include BYD Company, Han's Laser, Sinovac Biotech, Skyworth, Hytera and Topray Solar.
