= Fushun Mining Group =

Chinese coal and oil shale company

- Type: state-owned
- Industry: Coal mining Oil shale industry
- Headquarters: Fushun, Liaoning province, China
- Key people: Yin Liang, President
- Products: coal shale oil
- Number of employees: 40,000
- Website: www.fkyyy.com/

Fushun Mining Group (Chinese: 抚顺矿业集团有限责任公司, FMG) is a large state-owned coal and oil shale company located in Fushun, Liaoning Province, China. The corporation consists of about 30 companies with about 28,000 employees. The main business includes coal mining and oil shale processing. According to figures released by FMG, this company is one of the world's largest shale oil producers.

== History ==
With the Japanese victory over Imperial Russia and signing of the Treaty of Portsmouth, the South Manchuria branch (from Changchun to Lüshun) of the China Far East Railway was transferred to Japanese control. South Manchuria Railway Company quickly expanded the system inherited from Russia to staggering proportions, one of their actions were developing coal mines at Fushun. Under the control of Japanese, Fushun area became a highly industrialized area via 30 years development. After World War II, Fushun Coal Mine of the South Manchuria Railway Company was taken over by the Kuomintang and Fushun Mining Administration Bureau was established by the Kuomintang Government in 1946. In 1948, Fushun Coal Mine went under control of the China Communist Party and became one of industrial centers for People's Republic of China.

== Operations ==
The corporation consists of about 30 companies with about 28,000 employees. Although FMG has so many sub-companies, most of profit is mainly from Laohutai Coal Mine, West Open Pit, East Open Pit and Oil Shale Plant. Other subsidiaries like transporting company, machinery factory and machine repairing factory are under deficit according to the financing report released by FMG in 2013.Since 2002, the development strategy of FMG is non-coal industry. Therefore, FMG invested heavily in non-coal industry such as shale oil retorting, paper making and oil processing.

=== Coal mining ===
Fushun is known as "the capital of coal" for which once had great coal reserves. As a state-owned company, most of Fushun coal reserves are in the hands of FMG. FMG has three main coal mines including Laohutai Coal Mine, West Open Pit and East Open Pit. Due to the decline of coal reserve, the coal production has great decreasing for recent years compared with its history records. According to the information announced by FMG, West Open Pit will be closed in 2019 and Laohutai Coal Mine be closed in 2026. The main coal products for these three coal mines include blending coking coal and steam coal which are high quality coal for steel making. To confront this situation, the business focus is planned to be shift from coal mining industry to oil industry and paper making industry. Also according to the latest financing report, FMG have borrowed several billion RMB from several government banks to invest the oil processing industry and paper making industry. Moreover, FMG is also rich in coalbed methane resources that total around 8.9 billion cubic metres (310 billion cubic feet). However, there is a great risk for FMG to run the non-coal business for whose management system is a very state-owned company style.

=== Oil shale industry ===
Commercial retorting of oil shale in FMG started in 1991 with an oil shale retorting plant being established at that year. Fushun Mining Group owns geological reserve of high grade oil shale about 3.5 billion tons, of which exploitable reserve is 920 million tons. Among them, East Open Pit has oil shale reserve about (760 million tons) and West Open Pit has (160 million tons). At the end of 2008, the company operated the largest oil shale plant in the world consisting eleven retorting units with 20 retorts in each unit, total 220 sets of Fushun-type retort. Annual oil shale processing capacity is designed to be 11 million tons of oil shale, and annual shale oil yields to be 330,000 tons. FMG is constructing the Alberta Taciuk processor (ATP) to treat small size oil shale (particulate oil shale) which can not be processed by Fushun retort. The 250 tonnes per hour ATP processor, scheduled to start operation at the end of 2010, is engineered and constructed by cement and mineral equipment supplier, Polysius AG of the ThyssenKrupp and uses technology developed by UMATAC Industrial Processes, a Canadian subsidiary of Polysius AG. It seems that ATP Project like a Gordian Knot for FMG as which lasts more than 8 years. An Australian company named Procom had been invited since September 2012 to help FMG for the commissioning of ATP Processor as Procom claimed that they had ATP Processor commissioning experience. Procom operated the first industrial ATP application in Gladstone, QLD Australia. In late August 2013 the first oil was produced from oil shale out of the ATP, but it is still very hard to have continuous running for ATP plant.

== Management board ==
Currently, FMG president is Li Qing who was the former vice director of Liaoning Coal Mining Administration. However, the former president Yin Liang still have great influence on this company after he retired in 2012.

== See also ==
- Fushun Special Steel
