= Wang Xuan (computer scientist) =

Chinese computer scientist (1936–2006)

- Born: February 5, 1937; Wuxi, Jiangsu, China
- Died: February 13, 2006 (aged 69)
- Education: Peking University
- Scientific career
- Fields: Computer science

Wang Xuan (simplified Chinese: 王选; traditional Chinese: 王選; pinyin: Wáng Xuǎn; February 5, 1937 – February 13, 2006) was a Chinese computer scientist. He was a computer application specialist and innovator of the Chinese printing industry, as well as an academician at both the Chinese Academy of Sciences and the Chinese Academy of Engineering. He was the vice-president of the CPPCC and founder of the major technology conglomerate company Founder Group in 1986.

== Biography ==
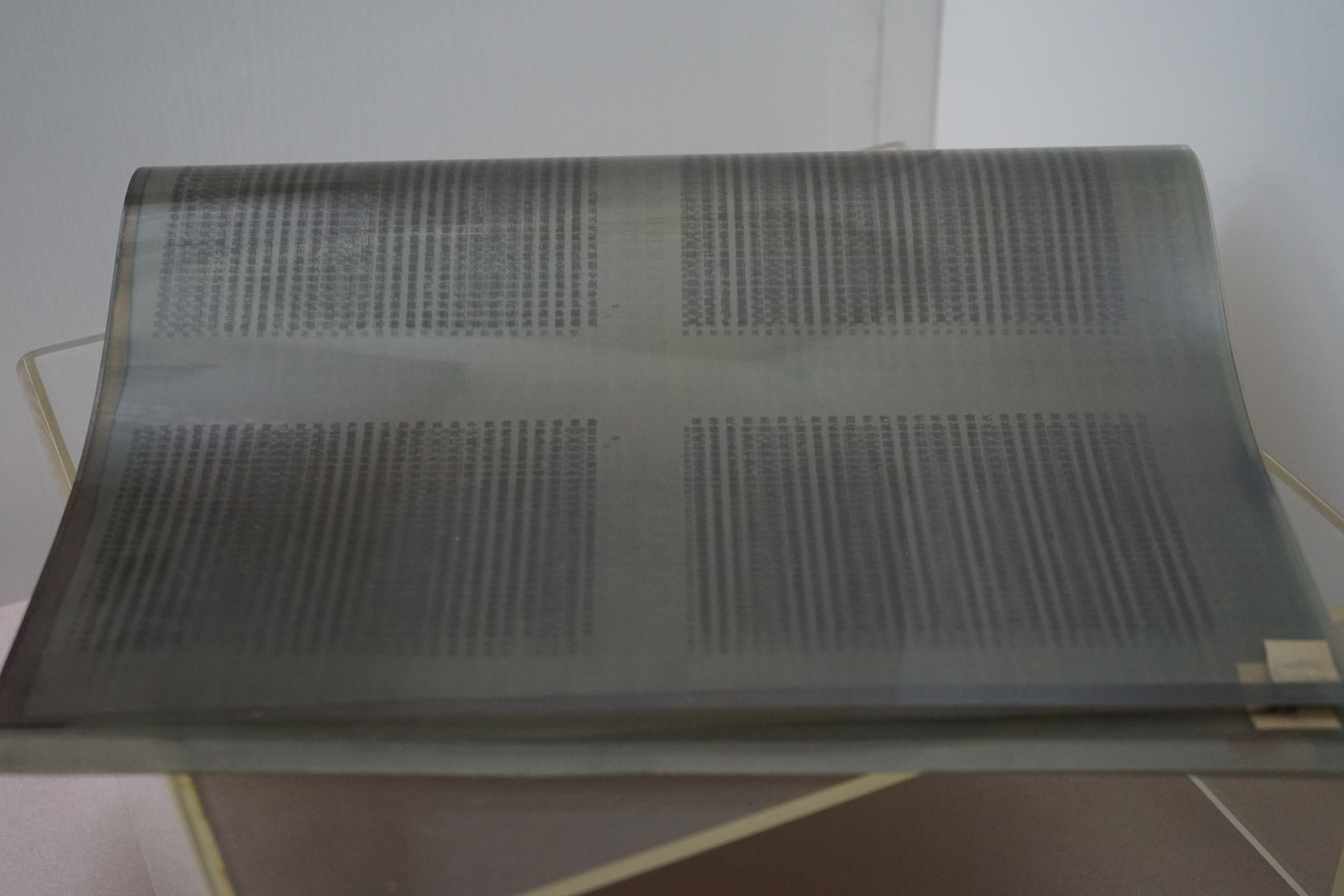
Negative film for examining characters used by Wang Xuan

Wang was born into a distinguished intellectual family on 5 February 1937, in Shanghai, with his ancestral home in Wuxi, Jiangsu, to Wang Shouqi, a graduate of National Jiaotong University (now Shanghai Jiao Tong University), and Zhou Miaoqing. His grandfather Wang Zai was a politician during the late Qing dynasty (1644–1911). He had four siblings, with two brothers and two sisters. His eldest sister, Wang Jian, was admitted to the pre-medical program of Yenching University in 1947 and later studied at Peking Union Medical College and worked at the General Hospital of Nanjing Military Region after graduation. His eldest brother, Wang Yu, graduated from the Department of Electrical Engineering of National Jiaotong University and later taught at Datong Coal Mining School and the Beijing Coal Mining Cadre Management College. His second elder sister, Wang Jun, enrolled at the Department of Physics at Fudan University and was engaged in work related to nuclear physics. His second elder, Wang Xun, was an academician of the Chinese Academy of Sciences.

Wang Xuan graduated from the Department of Mathematics and Mechanics at Peking University in 1958 and devoted himself to computer science education and research. He was mainly involved in research into computer processing of words, graphics and images. In 1975, he was in charge of the research and development of laser typesetting systems in the Chinese language and of electronic publishing systems. Surpassing Japan's second-generation optical designation and the third-generation CRT designation, the fourth-generation laser typesetting system he invented has not yet come onto the market in other countries. Thus he is dubbed "the Father of Chinese Language Laser Typesetting".

== Awards and honors ==
Wang Xuan was awarded the State Preeminent Science and Technology Award in 2001 by President Jiang Zemin. Started in 2000, this highest degree prize of science and technology in China, has only been awarded to 9 scientists by 2006. Asteroid 4913 Wangxuan, discovered at the Purple Mountain Observatory in 1965, was named in his memory. The official naming citation was published by the Minor Planet Center on 24 November 2007 (M.P.C. 61266).
