= Mongolia Energy Corporation =

Mining company of Mongolia

- Formerly: New World Cyberbase
- Type: Public company
- Traded as: SEHK: 276
- Industry: Coal mining
- Founded: 1972
- Headquarters: Hong Kong
- Key people: Simon Lo (Chairman)

Chinese name
- Traditional Chinese: 蒙古能源有限公司
- Simplified Chinese: 蒙古能源有限公司
Transcriptions
- Website: mongolia-energy.com

Mongolia Energy Corporation Limited (MEC) is a mining and energy development holding company operating in Mongolia and Xinjiang in northwestern China. It was incorporated in Bermuda and listed on the Hong Kong Stock Exchange. MEC became a constituent to the MSCI Hong Kong Index from June 2008.

The company was criticised in 2008 as a China Concepts Stock, which had no real profit; its share price was only based on market speculation. The company was also criticised that it bought a private jet in 2005 by recapitalisation. The jet was sold in 2007.

== History ==
Mongolia Energy Limited was listed on the Stock Exchange of Hong Kong in 2007 through the transaction by which technology company New World Cyberbase, listed at the Hong Kong Stock Exchange since 1972, acquired all assets of Mongolia Energy Limited and renamed itself Mongolia Energy. In the 2007–2008 fiscal year, MEC acquired 66,000 hectares (660 km^{2}) of concession areas for coal, ferrous and non-ferrous metal resources in western Mongolia. Between January–February 2007, MEC entered into the acquisition of its first coal resources concessions at Khushuut and Darvi of 34,000 hectares (340 km^{2}) in western Mongolia. The acquisition was approved by MEC's shareholders in April 2007. In May 2007, MEC acquired 32,000 hectares (320 km^{2}) of coal, ferrous and non-ferrous metal resources concessions at Gants Mod in western Mongolia. In September 2007, MEC inked a co-operation deal with COSCO on intended transport guarantees. In December 2007, MEC acquired 20% stake of 487,509 hectares (4,875.09 km^{2}) oil and gas exploratory concession areas in western Mongolia, and the deal is at the feasibility study stage. To explore and develop this concession, MEC cooperates with CNPC Daqing Petroleum.

In January 2008, following exploration work in Khushuut of over 600 hectares (6.0 km^{2}) out of the 66,000 hectares (660 km^{2}) of concession areas, MEC received the final exploration report confirming adequate coal resources at the concessional areas. In March 2008, the company acquired a stake in a multi-metals project with explored tungsten and tin resources at Ruoqiang County in Xinjiang Province, China to be completed in mid-2009.

During the 2008–2009 fiscal year, MEC continued its acquisitions. In May 2008, MEC made its next acquisition of a coal, ferrous and non-ferrous metals resources concession in Olan Bulog and Govi-Altai of some 260,000 hectares (2,600 km^{2}) bringing the total western Mongolia concessions to 330,000 hectares (3,300 km^{2}). This was followed by acquisition of 25% of a resources corporation working on 2 billion tonnes of coal resources concession in Xinjiang providing MEC with 20% interest under this and other potential projects. In September 2008, MEC acquired 20% interest of over 1.18 million hectares oil and gas concessions in Southern Mongolia under a contested international bid of Ergel XII petroleum block.

== Operations ==
MEC, through its subsidiaries, engages in the acquisition, exploration, and mining of concessions of coal, ferrous and non-ferrous metals, and oil and gas resources in Mongolia and Xinjiang, China.

As of 2009, MEC controlled a total of 330,000 hectares (3,300 km^{2}) of concession areas. Starting from mid-2009, the company plans to produce 3 million tons of coking coal a year and increase the production to 8 million tons per year by 2012.

== See also ==
- Coal power in China
