= Dong Mingzhu =

Chinese businesswoman (born 1954)

- 董明珠
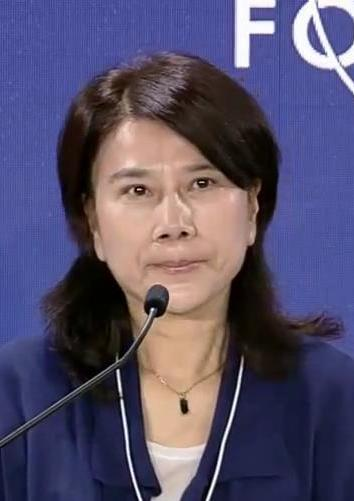
- Dong Mingzhu in 2014
- Born: August 1954 (age 71); Nanjing, Jiangsu, China
- Occupation: Chairwoman of Gree Electric
- Title: Chairman of the board of Gree Electric
- Term: May 2012–present
- Predecessor: Zhu Jianghong
- Children: 1 son

Dong Mingzhu (Chinese: 董明珠; pinyin: Dǒng Míngzhū; born August 1954) is a Chinese businesswoman who serves as Chairwoman and President of Gree Electric.

== Early life ==
Dong Mingzhu was born the youngest of seven children in a working-class family in Nanjing, capital of east China's Jiangsu province, in August 1954. When she was a child, she wanted to be a soldier. Dong graduated from a specialized institute in Wuhu, Anhui in 1975, with a degree in Statistics. After graduation, Dong got an administrative job at local government chemistry laboratory in Nanjing for 15 years.

== Career ==
In 1990, at age 36, recently widowed Dong left her three-year-old son to his grandmother and quit her job at the government research facility in order to move to the more economically developed Shenzhen in Guangdong province and to find a new job, but moved to Zhuhai soon.

Joining Haley (Gree Electric's predecessor) as a salesperson, she worked for four years as an air-conditioner saleswoman. "Sent to a poor province, Anhui, she produced one-eighth of Gree's annual sales, catching the attention of Zhu Jianghong, Gree's first general manager, now chairman of the board." By 1994, she was become the company's head of sales; by 1996, its deputy president; by 2001, its president; and by 2012, it's chairwoman.

According to The New York Times, "Gree had income in the first three quarters of 2010 of 44.3 billion renminbi, or $6.7 billion, and net profit of 2.9 billion renminbi." According to Fortune, "Gree Electric's company stock has risen 2300% during her stay and Dong has become a legend in China." Under her leadership, Gree Electric developed solar energy, China's smartphone market, robotic technology, recycled treatment centers nationwide, and acquired electric car maker Yinlong in March 2016.

In March 2019, she applied a cut on value-added taxes to reach more competitive prices and aim for an aggressive international development despite the US-China trade war going on.

In 2021, Fortune ranked Dong the seventh most powerful international women in the world.

According to Forbes, "Fiscal 2023 was Gree's best year to date, with profits of $4.1 billion, which it attributed to innovation efforts. In its first-ever ESG report, Gree said it owns 44 "internationally leading" technologies, of which 41 are related to green energy."

== Politics ==
Dong was a member of the 10th, 11th, and 12th National People's Congress. She is a member of the China Democratic National Construction Association, as well as a member of the 10th Executive Committee of All-China Women's Federation. Dong currently "holds senior positions in a dozen industry, women's and charity organizations, and has taught university business classes."

In 2011, Dong said, "Everyone should learn Chinese. China has so much to contribute to the world. If Gree is going to globalize, I always tell my colleagues, globalization should take place in Chinese." She later clarified her remarks, saying, "We all have to stop thinking that our own country is better than someone else's. That's no good."

In 2023 Dong "was reported by local media to have said that her company's 13,000 research and development personnel did not include a single overseas returnee, and consisted entirely of local graduates. Back then, she did not cite espionage concerns, instead championing the cause that Chinese schools were capable of developing talent."

In April 2025, Dong said the company would not hire any Chinese who had been educated overseas, since "There are spies among overseas returnees, and I don't know who is and who isn't." A Straits Times article said "the comment and ensuing uproar point to the mixed attitudes confronting some Chinese who have returned home after spending time abroad." Alfred Wu of the Lee Kuan Yew School of Public Policy "noted that Ms Dong's remarks reflect a broader caution within China towards foreign countries – one that has been exacerbated by an ongoing national security drive." On the other hand, Beijing News, a media outlet owned by China's Communist Party, called Mingzhu's remarks "a departure from common sense," "especially offensive" and an "affront" to overseas returnees.

== Prizes ==
- 2015: 4th most powerful woman in Asia-Pacific by Fortune magazine
- 2013: "Woman in the Mix" for business by Forbes Asia

== Personal life ==
Dong married soon after graduating from university, but was widowed when her son turned two years old. Her husband died of illness in 1984. Her son nicknamed "Dongdong" (东东). She never remarried. The New York Times called her "one of the toughest businesswomen in China."

In 2018, law enforcement in Ningbo mistakenly accused Dong of jaywalking because her face was featured in an advertisement on the side of a bus and inaccurately flagged by a facial recognition system.

== Published work ==
- Regretless Pursuit, 2006, which was made into a television series on China Central Television.

Business positions
Previous: Zhu Jianghong	Chairman of the board of Gree Electric; 2012–present	Incumbent
