= Founder Technology =

Chinese technology company

Founder Technology Group Corporation 方正科技集团股份有限公司
- Type: State-owned enterprise
- Industry: Information technology
- Founded: 1986
- Headquarters: Shanghai, People's Republic of China
- Area served: People's Republic of China
- Key people: Mr. Fang Zhonghua (Chairman)
- Parent: Founder Group
- Website: Founder Tech(in English); Founder Tech(in Chinese)

Founder Technology Group Corporation (SSE: 600601), a subsidiary of Founder Group from Peking University, is an information technology state-owned enterprise in Shanghai, China. It is engaged in the development of personal computers and computer peripherals, under the brand of "Fang Zheng" (方正), and printed circuit boards.

== History ==
Founder Technology was established in 1986 and listed on the Shanghai Stock Exchange in 1990.
