= Han's Laser =

Chinese laser company

Han's Laser Technology Industry Group Co., Ltd.
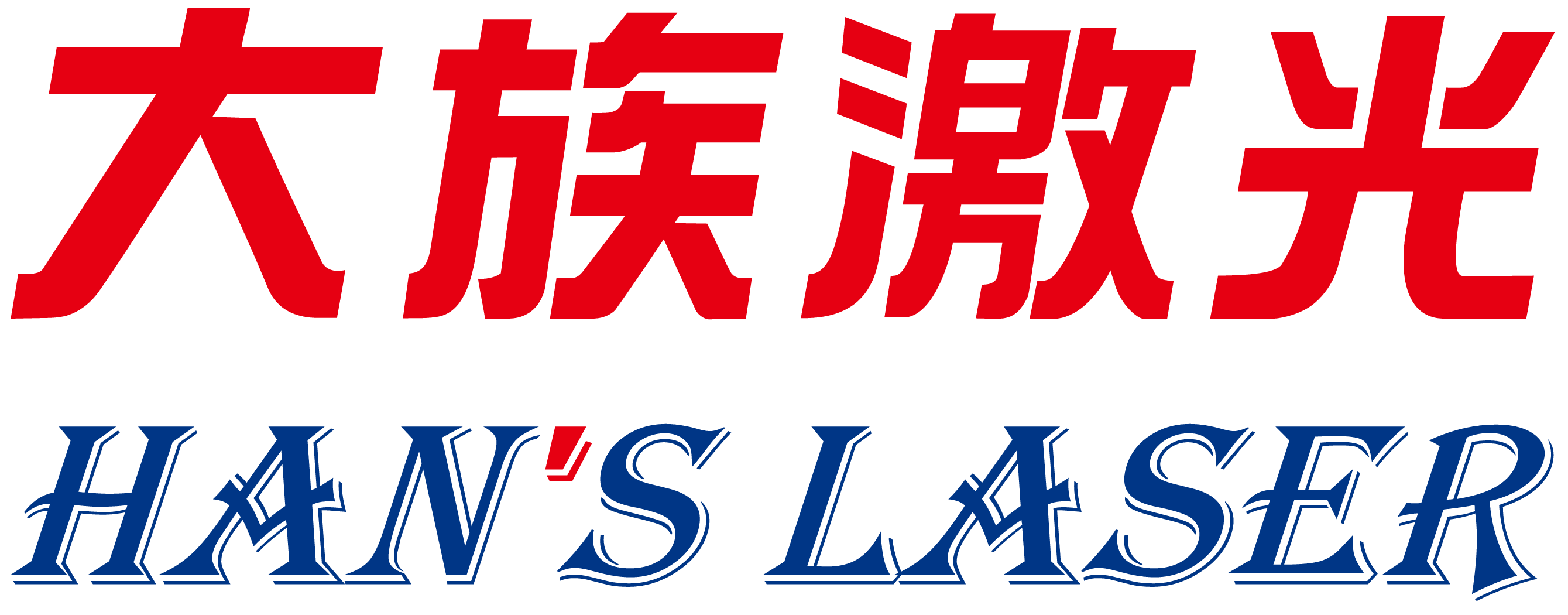

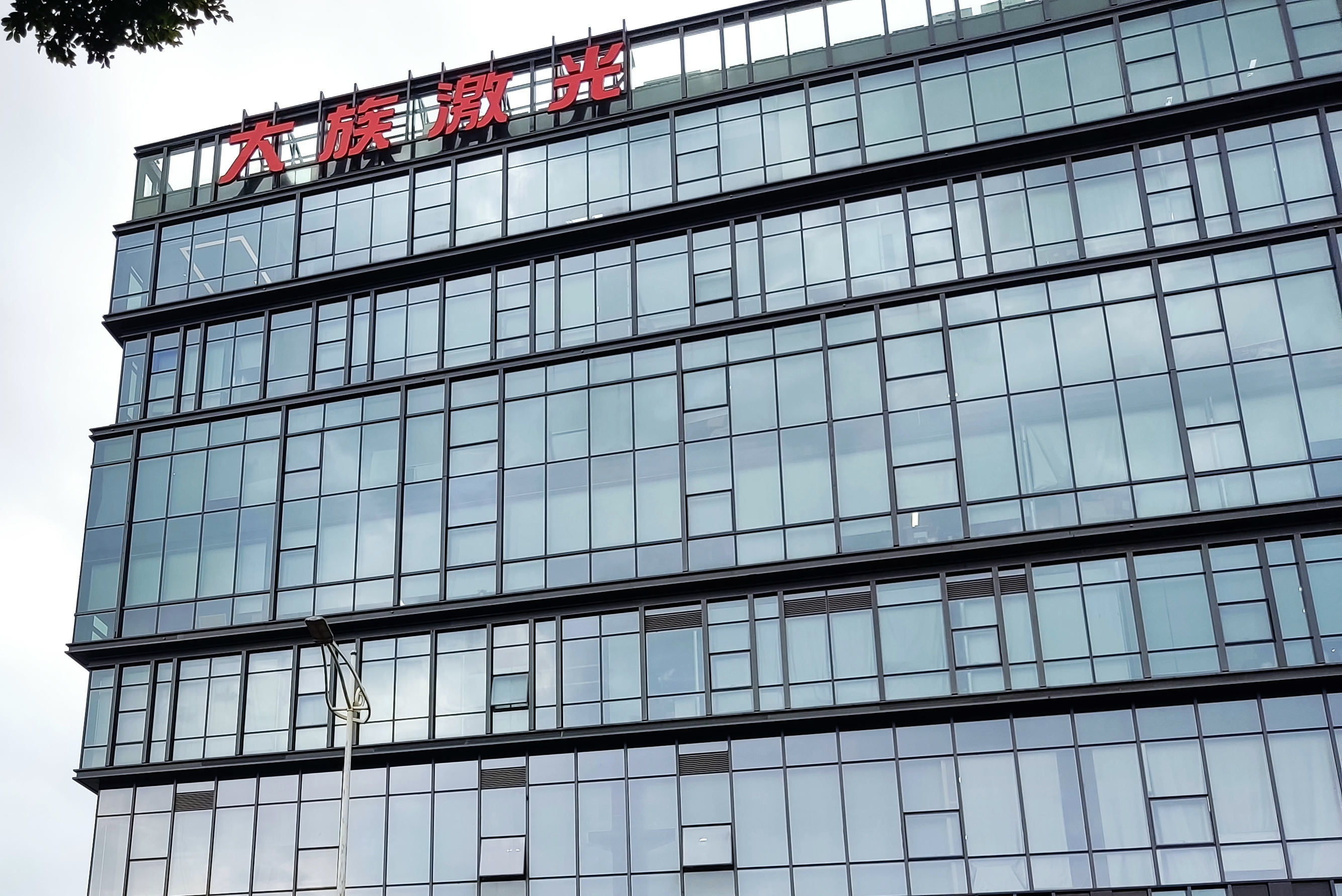
- Manufacturing base in Bao'an, Shenzhen
- Native name: 大族激光科技产业集团股份有限公司
- Type: Public
- Traded as: SZSE: 002008
- Industry: Industrial laser equipment
- Founded: 18 November 1996; 29 years ago
- Founder: Gao Yunfeng
- Headquarters: Shenzhen, Guangdong, China
- Key people: Gao Yunfeng (Chairman & CEO)
- Revenue: ▼CN¥14.09 billion (2023)
- Net income: ▼CN¥911.12 million (2023)
- Total assets: ▲CN¥234.20 billion (2023)
- Total equity: ▲CN¥16.38 billion (2023)
- Number of employees: 16,970 (2023)
- Website: www.hanslaser.net

Han's Laser (Chinese: 大族激光; pinyin: Dàzú Jīguāng) is a publicly listed Chinese company that engages in the manufacture and sale of industrial laser equipment. It is one of the largest laser companies in China.

== Background ==
In 1996, Han's Laser was founded in Shenzhen by Gao Yunfeng who previously taught at the Nanjing University of Aeronautics and Astronautics. The idea came after Gao helped to repair a foreign industrial machine for a friend as at the time foreign firm's did not pay much attention to foreign markets and the repair process took a long time. Using CNY400,000 from his friend as payment for the repairs. Gao decided to rent a house in Shenzhen to start his business.

The location was chosen as it attracted a lot of young college graduates across the country that it could recruit for its research and development (R&D) unit.

When Han's Laser first started, it provided services to button makers by printing logos on them.

To raise capital for the company, Gao had to give up his controlling stake of the company to investors such as Shenzhen HTI Group.

In 2000, Han's Laser hired Wang Daheng as a technology consultant to the company. The company hired other academics from the Chinese Academy of Sciences which contributed to the rise of its R&D strength.

In 2001, Gao had a conflict with Han's Laser's management team chosen by Shenzhen HTI Group. As a result, he went to loan sharks to borrow money to repurchase enough shares of the company to regain control. The company restructured as a result. During the same year, Han's Laser stated expanding into overseas markets.

In 2004, Han's Laser held its initial public offering and became a listed company on the Shenzhen Stock Exchange.

Due to the Made in China 2025 policy, there was a large demand for laser equipment which benefitted Han's Laser. Compared to its peers, Han's Laser product line covered a larger range of industries.

In November 2016, Han's Laser acquired CorActive High-Tech, a manufacturer of specialty optical fiber and fiber laser modules based in Quebec, Canada.

On 5 March 2019, the Shenzhen Stock Exchange notified the Hong Kong Stock Exchange that shares of Han's Laser could no longer be purchased via the Shenzhen-Hong Kong Stock Connect program as foreign ownership of the company had already exceeded the 28% threshold and was close to the 30% hard limit. At the time, this was only the second stock in the program's history to approach an upper limit for foreign ownership. MSCI which had previously included the company in its China All Shares Index removed it on 11 March citing potential investability issue for investors.

In May 2023, it was reported that Han's Laser had purchased 262 acres in Manor, Texas which was speculated to be a project to build a factory there that could grow to provide over 1,000 jobs in the area.

In September 2025, it was reported that Han's Laser was expanding its product offering from semiconductors to new markets, as industrial laser demand slide.

== Controversies ==
In July 2019, Tiger Vision Financial Research released a report that questioned the authenticity of Han's Laser's European R&D center project in Switzerland. It claimed that the funds of CNY1.1 billion for it were embezzled to build a luxury hotel instead. In response, Han's Laser made a statement on East Money that stated the European R&D center was an independent project and that there were no misappropriation of funds. Shares of the company declined by 9.11% afterwards. A visit to the registered address of the R&D center in Engelberg revealed it was only a room of about 10 square meters.

In August 2019, Gao was interviewed on a China Central Television program where he was asked about the embezzlement scandal. Gao lashed out at the reporter asking if the reporter was qualified to question him. The Shenzhen Stock Exchange criticized Gao's remarks. Shortly afterwards, Han's Laser issued a statement apologizing for Gao's remarks. Despite this, shares of Han's declined 8.8% on that day.
