= Dongbei Special Steel =

Chinese steel company

- Type: State-owned enterprise
- Predecessor: Liaoning Special Steel Group; Beiman Special Steel Group
- Founded: 2004
- Founder: Liaoning and Heilongjiang Governments
- Headquarters: Dalian, Liaoning, China
- Revenue: ▲CN¥20.791 billion (2014)
- Operating income: ▲CN¥154.787 million (2014)
- Net income: ▲CN¥97.323 billion (2014)
- Total assets: ▼CN¥51.818 billion (2014)
- Total equity: ▲CN¥6.453 billion (2014)
- Owner: Liaoning Government (68.8069%); Heilongjiang Government (14.5191%); Orient Asset Management (16.6740%)
- Parent: State-owned Assets Supervision & Administration Commission of Liaoning Government
- Subsidiaries: Dalian Special Steel (100%); Beiman Special Steel (58.63%); Shanghai Special Steel (99.67%)
- Website: dtsteel.com
- Footnotes in a consolidated basis

Dongbei Special Steel Group Co., Ltd.
- Simplified Chinese: 东北特殊钢集团有限责任公司
- Traditional Chinese: 東北特殊鋼集團有限責任公司
Transcriptions
Standard Mandarin
- Hanyu Pinyin: Dōngběi tèshū gāng jítuán yǒuxiàn zérèn gōngsī

Dongbei Special Steel Group Co., Ltd. is a state-owned enterprise based in Dalian, Liaoning Province (the south most city of Northeastern China or Dongbei). It was owned by State-owned Assets Supervision and Administration Commission (SASAC) of the Provincial Government of Liaoning (46.1230%) and Heilongjiang (14.5191%), as well as a subsidiary of Liaoning SASAC (22.6839%) and China Orient Asset Management (16.6740%).

The company was formed by the merger of Dalian Special Steel (aka Liaoning Special Steel Group) and Beiman Special Steel Group (literally North Manchuria Special Steel) in 2004. Dongbei Special Steel became the holding company of the two steel maker, plus Fushun Special Steel, a subsidiary of Liaoning Special Steel Group.

In 2016 the enterprise defaulted several times. Chairman Yang Hua committed suicide in March 2016, four days before the first default.

== Subsidiaries ==
- Dalian Special Steel Co., Ltd. (100%)
- Beiman Special Steel Co., Ltd. (58.63%)
- Shanghai Special Steel Co., Ltd. (99.67%) - wholesaler and retailer of Dongbei Special Steel in Shanghai City

== Equity investment ==
Dongbei Special Steel owned 38.58% stake in Fushun Special Steel (Chinese: 抚顺特殊钢股份有限公司), based in Fushun, Liaoning, as the largest shareholder. The shares of the company float in the Shanghai Stock Exchange.
