= PKU Healthcare =

Chinese pharmaceutical company

- Logo of PKU Healthcare Group (left), calligraphy of "PKU Healthcare" (top right) and English name (bottom right)
- Formerly: Southwest Synthetic Pharmaceuticals
- Type: public
- Traded as: SZSE: 000788
- Industry: pharmaceutical
- Headquarters: Chongqing, China
- Revenue: ▼CN¥2.011 billion (2015)
- Operating income: ▼ (CN¥45 million) (2015)
- Net income: ▲CN¥25 million (2015)
- Total assets: ▼CN¥3.124 billion (2015)
- Total equity: ▲CN¥1.133 billion (2015)
Owner
PKU Healthcare Group	(40.38%)
China Securities Finance	(1.94%)
public shareholders	(57.68%)
Parent
SW Pharmaceutical Group	(direct)
PKU Healthcare Group	(intermediate)
Founder Group	(intermediate)
PKU Asset Management	(intermediate)
Peking University	(intermediate)
Ministry of Education	(intermediate)
State Council	(ultimate)
- Website: pku-hc.com

PKU Healthcare Corp., Ltd.
- Simplified Chinese: 北大医药股份有限公司
Transcriptions

PKU Healthcare
- Simplified Chinese: 北大医药
Transcriptions

PKU Healthcare Co., Ltd. formerly known as PKU International Healthcare Group Southwest Pharmaceutical Co., Ltd., is a Chinese pharmaceutical company. The major shareholder was PKU Healthcare Group, a subsidiary of PKU Founder Group. PKU Founder Group itself is a subsidiary of Peking University, in turn making the listed company a state-owned enterprise by broader definition.

== History ==
PKU International Healthcare Group Southwest Pharmaceutical Co., Ltd. (Chinese: 北大国际医院集团西南合成制药股份有限公司; lit. 'Peking University International Hospital Group Southwest Synthetic Pharmaceutical', 'Company Limited by Shares') known also as Southwest Synthetic Pharmaceuticals (Chinese: 西南合成), is an indirect subsidiary of Peking University since 2003. In 2013 the company was renamed into PKU Healthcare Corp., Ltd. (Chinese: 北大医药股份有限公司).

=== Foundation (1993–2003) ===
Southwest Synthetic Pharmaceutical Co., Ltd. (Chinese: 西南合成制药股份有限公司) was incorporated on 18 May 1993 as a subsidiary of Southwest Synthetic Pharmaceutical Factory (Chinese: 西南合成制药总厂), which was owned by Chongqing Municipal People's Government. The factory itself was founded in 1965.

Due to financial difficulties, 1.26% shares of the listed company was acquired by Sichuan No.2 Electric Power Construction in 2001 from the parent entity (Southwest Synthetic Pharmaceutical Factory).

=== Acquired by Founder Group (2003–) ===
In 2002 47.31% shares of the listed company was entrusted to a private company (Chinese: 南方同正投资) by the parent (Southwest Synthetic Pharmaceutical Factory). In June 2003, China Huarong Asset Management, the state-owned bad bank, made a public offer to sell the credit of themselves to the parent entity (Southwest Synthetic Pharmaceutical Factory). On 4 September the parent entity was re-incorporated as Chongqing Southwest Synthetic Pharmaceutical Co., Ltd. (Chinese: 重庆西南合成制药有限公司), (Note: Chongqing Southwest Synthetic Pharmaceutical was later renamed into Southwest Synthetic Pharmaceutical Group (Chinese: 西南合成医药集团)) with part of the debt was converted into share capital, making state-owned China Development Bank owned 39.80% share capital as second largest shareholder. On 1 July of the same year, the management of the intermediate parent company (Southwest Synthetic Pharmaceutical Group) was also entrusted to state-owned PKU Founder Group, the aforementioned trust contract regarding the shares of the listed company, that was signed with aforementioned private company, was also canceled on the same day. On 29 September, an agreement was formed between Founder Group, China Development Bank and the ultimate owner (Chinese: 重庆化医控股集团), which Founder Group would acquired a majority stake (about 70%) in the intermediate parent company (Southwest Synthetic Pharmaceutical Group) by subscription of new share capital of CN¥300 million, as well as withdrew of China Development Bank by selling the 39.80% share capital to the original major shareholder (Chinese: 重庆化医控股集团), making Founder Group was the indirect major shareholder of the listed company for 47.31% share.

Since acquired by PKU Founder Group, Southwest Synthetic Pharmaceutical received assets from the parent company and renamed to PKU Healthcare in 2013.

== Shareholders ==
As of 31 December 2015, PKU Healthcare Group (Chinese: 北大医疗产业集团) owned 40.38% shares of PKU Healthcare directly and indirectly (via Southwest Pharmaceutical Group Chinese: 西南合成医药集团) as the largest shareholder; PKU Founder Group was the parent company of PKU Healthcare Group for 85.60%, with the rest were owned by Peking University; Peking University's wholly owned subsidiary: Peking University Asset Management owned 70% stake of PKU Founder Group; as Peking University was supervised by the Ministry of Education, PKU Healthcare was considered a state-owned enterprise in a border definition; Peking University Asset Management also owned an additional 0.36% via another subsidiary (40.74% in total).

The second largest shareholder was China Securities Finance for 1.94% shares.

PKU Healthcare Group owned 51.95% shares as of 31 December 2012. During 2013 6.71% shares were sold to Beijing Zenith Holdings (Chinese: 北京政泉控股) a private company that was linked to Guo Wengui for CN¥368 million (CN¥9.20 per share) and an additional 5.03% shares were sold to Peking University Education Foundation. However, it was later found that the private company did not pay PKU Healthcare Group due to its financial difficulty. Instead, the company signed an agreement with PKU Resources Group Holdings, sister company of PKU Healthcare Group to hold the shares of the listed company as a proxy of PKU Resources Group Holdings. All 3 companies were fined by China Securities Regulatory Commission in 2016.

Zenith Holdings also sold the shares in 2014 (1.73% for CN¥17.98 each and an additional 4.44% for undisclosed price) and in 2015; at the same time PKU Healthcare Group announced that the company would bought back not more than 2% shares in November 2014 from public market. In July 2015 0.18% shares were bought for CN¥18.28 each. In October PKU Healthcare announced that the share buy back program was completed.
