= Gree Electric =

Chinese major appliance manufacturer headquartered in Zhuhai, Guangdong

GREE Electric Appliances Inc. of Zhuhai
- Native name: 珠海格力電器股份有限公司
- Type: Public
- Traded as: SZSE: 000651; CSI A100
- Industry: Home appliances
- Founded: 1991; 35 years ago
- Headquarters: Zhuhai, Guangdong, China
- Area served: Worldwide
- Key people: Dong Mingzhu (Chairwoman & President)
- Products: Major appliances Small appliances
- Revenue: $27.9 billion (2022)
- Net income: $3.7 billion (2022)
- Total assets: $44.3 billion (2022)
- Website: global.gree.com greecomfort.com

Gree Electric Appliances Inc. of Zhuhai
- Traditional Chinese: 珠海格力電器股份有限公司
- Simplified Chinese: 珠海格力电器股份有限公司
Transcriptions
Standard Mandarin
- Hanyu Pinyin: Zhūhǎi Gélì diànqì gǔfèn yǒuxiàn gōngsī

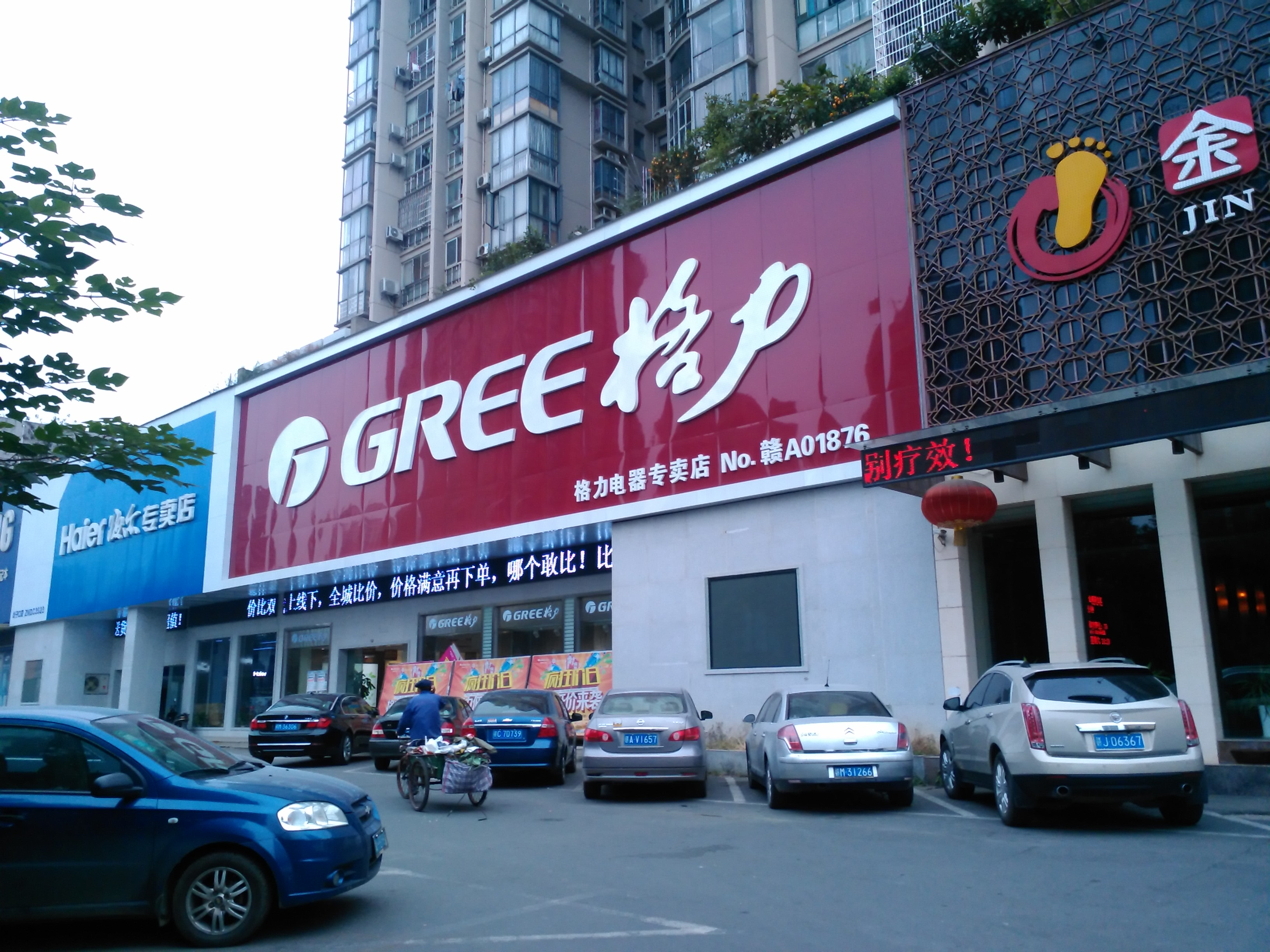
Store in Nanchang.

GREE Electric Appliances Inc. of Zhuhai, branded as GREE (Chinese: 格力) is a Chinese home appliances manufacturer headquartered in Zhuhai, Guangdong province. It is the world's largest air-conditioner manufacturer. The company offers two types of air conditioners: household air conditioners and commercial air conditioners. The company also produces electric fans, water dispensers, heaters, rice cookers, air purifiers, water kettles, humidifiers and induction cookers, among other products. It distributes its products in China and abroad under the brand name GREE. The company has two joint-ventures with Daikin, Zhuhai GREE Daikin Device Co., Ltd., and Zhuhai GREE Daikin Precision Mold Co., Ltd.

== History ==
GREE was established in Zhuhai, Guangdong, in 1989 under its former name of Zhuhai City Haili Cooling Engineering Company Limited (Chinese: 珠海市海利冷气工程股份有限公司). It was restructured and renamed GREE Electric Appliances Inc. of Zhuhai in 1994. The company started as a nameless factory with 200 employees and annual production of less than 20,000 units.

It was listed on the Shenzhen Stock Exchange in 1996. The company grew 47% in 2008, despite the 2008 financial crisis, booking $23 billion in contract sales. The company is a multinational enterprise with 70,000 employees and annual production of 65.5 million units. In April 2011, GREE announced that first-quarter net income rose 47 percent from a year earlier to 934.7 million Yuan.

== Products ==
GREE makes air-conditioners of all types and small household appliances. Between 2015 and 2021, Gree Electric also introduced several mobile phone models.

== Management ==
GREE Electric's Chairwoman is Dong Mingzhu, or "Sister Dong" as she is known in China. She was appointed CEO in 2009. She joined the company in 1990. Dong was also the Chairwoman of its largest shareholder at the time, GREE Group, until November 2016.

== Shareholders ==
GREE Electric was a subsidiary of Zhuhai GREE Group, a majority state-owned enterprise of the city of Zhuhai, which owned a 50.289% stake in the company in 2001. GREE remained its largest shareholder until 2019 when they sold most of their stake to Zhuhai Mingjun Investment Partnership, made up of private equity funds including Hillhouse Capital. Zhuhai Mingjun acquired 15% of the company's total shareholding capital for 41 billion RMB, while GREE retained a 3.22% stake. The sale meant that GREE Electric's corporate governance shifted from having the City of Zhuhai as controller to having no single controller.

Other notable shareholders in the 2010s included Hebei Jinghai Investment Guarantee, China Securities Finance (for 2.99%), Central Huijin Investment (for 1.40%), UBS (for 1.21%), Foresea Life Insurance (for 1.14%), Yale University (for 0.95%), Hexie Health Insurance (for 0.80%), and chairwoman Dong Mingzhu (for 0.73%).

== Sponsorships ==
In 2022, GREE Electric become one of the AFF Mitsubishi Electric Cup 2022, chosen by Mitsubishi Electric, along with Maspion Holdings, Wuling Motors, Mercedes-Benz, Tiger Brokers and Yanmar. Real Betis Balompié, known as Real Betis is sponsored by GREE.
