= Fushun Special Steel =

Chinese steel company

- Type: Public
- Traded as: SSE: 600399
- Founded: 1937; 1999 (listed company)
- Headquarters: Fushun, Liaoning, China
- Revenue: ▼CN¥4.558 billion (2015)
- Operating income: ▲CN¥92,073 million (2015)
- Net income: ▲CN¥196.733 million (2015)
- Total assets: ▲CN¥12.995 billion (2015)
- Total equity: ▲CN¥1.919 billion (2015)
- Owner: Dongbei Special Steel (38.58%); others
- Website: fs-ss.com
- Footnotes in a consolidated basis

Fushun Special Steel Co., Ltd.
- Simplified Chinese: 抚顺特殊钢股份有限公司
- Traditional Chinese: 撫順特殊鋼股份有限公司
- Literal meaning: Fushun Special Steel Joint-stock Limited Company
Transcriptions
Standard Mandarin
- Hanyu Pinyin: Fǔshùn tèshū gāng gǔfèn yǒuxiàn gōngsī

Fushun Special Steel Co., Ltd. (FSSS) is a Chinese steel maker based in Fushun, Liaoning Province. State enterprise Dongbei Special Steel was the largest shareholder of the company. The rest of the shares float in Shanghai Stock Exchange.

According to the officials of the company, the steel maker supplied steel to the manufacturing of aircraft carrier of China.

== History ==
The steel refinery was founded in 1937 by Japanese South Manchuria Railway Company in the occupied zone of wartime China. The steel refinery was then transferred to State-owned Assets Supervision and Administration Commission (SASAC) of the Government of Fushun City, and was renamed Fushun Special Steel (Group) Co., Ltd. (Chinese: 抚顺特殊钢(集团)有限责任公司). It was one of the 512 important state-owned enterprises in 1997 and one of the largest in the iron and steel industry.

In 1999, the assets of the refinery was re-incorporated as Fushun Special Steel Co., Ltd.. In the next year the shares of the company were float in Shanghai Stock Exchange. Fushun Special Steel (Group) remained as the largest shareholder for 76.29% stake.

In 2003 the shares held by the parent company was partially transferred to another state-owned enterprise Dongbei Special Steel (for 56.62% stake), which Fushun Special Steel (Group) became the second largest shareholder of the listed company for 19.67%. At the same time Fushun Special Steel (Group) became the second largest shareholder of Dongbei Special Steel for 26.53% stake.

On 30 December 2010 Fushun Special Steel (Group) went bankrupt, which Dongbei Special Steel received the shares of the listed company from Fushun Special Steel (Group), making Dongbei Special Steel hold 57.07% stake at that time, while the shares of Dongbei Special Steel (22.68% stake) held by Fushun Special Steel (Group) was transferred to a subsidiary (Chinese: 辽宁省国有资产经营有限公司) of SASAC of the Government of Liaoning Province in 2011.

Due to capital increase and disposals, the shares of the listed company held by Dongbei Special Steel was diluted to 38.58% on 31 December 2015.

== See also ==
- Fushun Mining Group
