= Guangxi Non-ferrous Metals =

Chinese industrial conglomerate

Guangxi Non-ferrous Metals Group Co., Ltd. 广西有色金属集团有限公司
- Native name: 广西有色金属集团有限公司
- Type: State-owned enterprise
- Industry: Metals, mining, smelting
- Founded: 2008
- Defunct: 2016
- Headquarters: Nanning, Guangxi, China
- Products: Non-ferrous metals (zinc, lead, tin, etc.)
- Revenue: ¥21.136 billion (2014)
- Operating income: ¥1.719 billion (2014)
- Net income: ¥−1.653 billion (2014)
- Total assets: ¥30.018 billion (2014)
- Total equity: ¥−158.539 million (2014)
- Owner: Guangxi Government
- Parent: SASAC of Guangxi Government
- Website: gxysjs.com (offline)

Guangxi Non-ferrous Metals Group Co., Ltd. (Chinese: 广西有色金属集团有限公司) was a Chinese state-owned enterprise based in Nanning, Guangxi. The company was engaged in mining, processing, and trading of non-ferrous metals including lead, zinc, tin, antimony, and rare earths. It was overseen by the State-owned Assets Supervision and Administration Commission (SASAC) of the Guangxi Zhuang Autonomous Region.

== History and Liquidation ==
Founded in 2008, Guangxi Non-ferrous Metals grew rapidly, backed by provincial government financing, and became an active issuer in China's interbank bond market. However, the company became insolvent due to high debt levels and declining metal prices.

On 20 September 2016, the company defaulted on ¥14.51 billion of debt and entered liquidation proceedings. It was the first interbank bond issuer in China to be declared bankrupt. The case underscored growing financial risk among state-owned enterprises and contributed to Beijing's push to reduce overcapacity in the metals and heavy industry sectors.

Following the bankruptcy, Guangxi Non-ferrous Metals' creditors rejected the proposed insolvency plan, leading to court-ordered liquidation. Its assets were sold off or absorbed by other regional enterprises during debt resolution efforts.
