= Beiman Special Steel =

Chinese state-owned steel maker

Beiman Special Steel Co., Ltd.
- Simplified Chinese: 北满特殊钢有限责任公司
- Traditional Chinese: 北滿特殊鋼有限責任公司
- Literal meaning: North Manchuria Special Steel Limited Liability Company
Transcriptions
Standard Mandarin
- Hanyu Pinyin: Běi mǎn tèshū gāng yǒuxiàn zérèn gōngsī

Dongbei Special Steel Group Beiman Special Steel Co., Ltd. is a state-owned steel maker based in Qiqihar, Heilongjiang Province. Bei-man was the acronym of North Manchuria. The company is a subsidiary of Dongbei Special Steel (literally East-Northern Special Steel).

== History ==
The steel refinery was founded in 1952 in Fularji District, Qiqihar. The refinery was the only special steel maker in the First Five-year plan of China (1953–1957), with the aid of Soviet Union. The refinery was completed in 1957. It was one of the 512 important state-owned enterprises in 1997. (1 of 47 iron and steel industry)

In 1993, the steel refinery was incorporated as a subsidiary of Beiman Special Steel Co., Ltd. and listed in Shanghai Stock Exchange (as SSE: 600853), which Bei Steel Group Co., Ltd. (Chinese: 北鋼集團有限責任公司) was the major shareholder for a 64.32% stake. In 2001, the assets of the refinery were sold back to the parent company, while the listed company was sold to another state-owned enterprise and renamed to Longjian Road and Bridge, as a reverse IPO. Bei Steel Group Co., Ltd. was also renamed to Beiman Special Steel Group Co., Ltd.. (Chinese: 北满特殊钢集团有限责任公司).

In 2004, the State-owned Assets Supervision and Administration Commission (SASAC) of the Provincial Government of Heilongjiang, the parent entity of Beiman Special Steel, injected the steel refinery into Dongbei Special Steel, a holding company of the Liaoning Government, as share capital. The holding company became the parent company of three steel refineries in Qiqihar, Dalian, and Fushun.

As of 31 December 2014, the parent company owned a 58.63% stake in Dongbei Special Steel Group Beiman Special Steel Co., Ltd.. Heilongjiang SASAC retained the rest.
