= Addor Capital =

China-based venture capital firm

- Native name: 毅達資本
- Company type: State-owned enterprise
- Industry: Investment management
- Founded: February 2014; 12 years ago
- Headquarters: Nanjing, Jiangsu, China
- Key people: Ying Wenlu (Chairman); You Jinbai (President)
- Products: Venture Capital; Private equity M&A; Real estate Fund of funds
- AUM: US$17.6 billion (January 2021)
- Owner: Jiangsu High-Tech Investment Group
- Website: www.addorcapital.com

Addor Capital (Addor) (Chinese: 毅達資本; pinyin: Yìdá Zīběn) is a Chinese investment firm founded in 2014. The firm is backed by the Jiangsu High-Tech Investment Group (Govtor Group), a state-owned investment company established by the Government of Jiangsu. It invests in companies from various industries including technology, manufacturing, energy and healthcare.

== Background ==
Addor was established in February 2014 as part of mixed-ownership reform that was implemented by the Jiangsu High-Tech Investment Group. A purely state-owned system had difficulty adapting to the needs of the specialized venture capital business hence Addor was created to help develop businesses with fully market-oriented rules.

Initially Addor encountered difficulties as while it managed funds for Govtor Group worth billions, the management fees of these funds could only cover operating costs for one year. In addition Addor had little visibility. The founders went to many cities in China to find business.

In July 2016, in a key milestone Addor stood out from 50 other bidding institutions to win a mandate from the China SME Development Fund. This allowed it to fundraise 4.5 billion yuan within a month seeing a new record in fundraising speed.

In 2017, Addor set up an entity in Beijing to establish its M&A and private equity business.

In 2019, Addor set up a subsidiary in Hong Kong to perform activities related to M&A and asset management in overseas markets.

In September 2020, Addor partnered with several Chinese companies including Jiangsu High-Tech Investment Group to established a $146 million fund to invest in emerging technology startups.

In September 2024, members of the Nanjing government visited Addor to discuss the layout of its investments in Nanjing.

Addor is headquartered in Nanjing with additional offices in other Chinese cities including Beijing, Shanghai and Guangzhou.

Notable investments include Dayun Auto.
