= Peking University Resources (Holdings) =

- logo of Peking University Resources Group
- Formerly: EC-Founder (Holdings)
- Type: public
- Traded as: SEHK: 618
- Industry: Real Estate, Information Technology
- Predecessor: Management Investment & Technology; Division of PKU Resources Group; Divisions of Founder Group
- Founded: 1991 (as MIT); 1992 (as PKU Resources Group); 2000 (backdoor listing as EC-Founder); 2013 (renamed as PKU Resources)
- Founder: Founder Holdings (in 2000)
Headquarters
Tsuen Wan, Hong Kong	(general office)
Hamilton, Bermuda	(registered office)
- Area served: mainland China
Key people
Cheung Shuen Lung	(Chairman)
Zeng Gang	(President)
Sun Min	(Executive director)
Shi Hua	(Executive director)
Liao Hang	(Executive director)
Zheng Fu Shuang	(Executive director)
- Products: Real Estate
- Services: Software
- Revenue: ▲HK$15.394 billion (2016)
- Net income: ▼ (HK$278 million) (2016)
- Total assets: ▲HK$49.213 billion (2016)
- Total equity: ▼HK$1.826 billion (2016)
Owner
Peking University consortium	(65.96%)
Zheng Fu Shuang consortium	(13.11%)
Rongtong Fund	(9.60%)
others/free-floats	(11.33%)
Parent
Founder Information HK	(direct)
PKU Resources Group Holdings	(intermediate)
PKU Resources Group	(intermediate)
Founder Group	(intermediate)
Peking University Asset Management	(intermediate)
Peking University	(intermediate)
The Ministry of Education	(intermediate)
The State Council	(ultimate)
- Website: pku-resources.com

Peking University Resources (Holdings) Co., Ltd.
- Simplified Chinese: 北大资源(控股)有限公司
- Traditional Chinese: 北大資源(控股)有限公司
Transcriptions
Standard Mandarin
- Hanyu Pinyin: Běidà zīyuán (kònggǔ) yǒuxiàn gōngsī

PKU Resources
- Simplified Chinese: 北大资源
- Traditional Chinese: 北大資源
Transcriptions
Standard Mandarin
- Hanyu Pinyin: Běidà zīyuán

Peking University Resources (Holdings) Co., Ltd. known also as PKU Resources is a Chinese listed company. The company was incorporated in Bermuda and listed in the Hong Kong Stock Exchange. The company is an indirect non-wholly-owned subsidiary of Peking University, which in turn under the administration of the Ministry of Education. The company is broadly considered a state-owned enterprise of China. For the same reason, PKU Resources is a red chip company.

The Hong Kong headquarters of the company was located on Room 1408, 14/F of Wharf Cable Tower, Tsuen Wan; the parent company of PKU Resources: PKU Resources Group Holdings and PKU Resources Group were headquartered in Beijing.

The company had less than 20% free-floating shares if excluding the shares held by "Ronghai No. 10 SNIA QDII", a private equity fund managed by Rongtong Fund Management, as well as the shares held by a consortium of the executive director Zheng Fu Shuang. The company was not included in any stock market indice, thus it is not eligible to Shenzhen-Hong Kong Stock Connect nor Shanghai-Hong Kong Stock Connect.

== Name ==
Despite Peking University Resources (Holdings) was commonly known as Peking University Resources, in mainland China, there were more famous Peking University Resources Group (Chinese: 北大资源集团), found in 1992, and its subsidiary Peking University Resources Group Holdings (Chinese: 北大资源集团控股), which were the parent companies of Hong Kong-based listed company.

Peking University Resources (Holdings) was known as Management Investment & Technology (Holdings) from 1991 to 2000 and EC-Founder (Holdings) (Chinese: 方正數碼(控股)) from 2000 to 2013.

== History ==
The company was registered (as a foreign company) in Hong Kong on 10 September 1991 as Management Investment & Technology (Holdings). In 2000 it was takeover by Founder Holdings (SEHK: 418), a subsidiary of Founder Group and backdoor listing the assets of the group.

In 2013, the company acquired some real estate business from intermediate parent company Founder Group and renamed into Peking University Resources (Holdings). The listed company also issued 326,792,000 number of new shares to independent third parties for HK$0.80 each in December 2013. After the deal Founder Group and Zheng Fu Shuang (Chinese: 鄭福雙) still owned a combined 63.74% shares.

In 2014, Peking University Resources acquired 12 projects from another intermediate parent company Peking University Resources Group Holdings in cash and shares deal (the shares was allocated to intermediate holding company Founder Information). In December 2014 new shares were issued to Zheng Fu Shuang and other shareholders for HK$0.65 each.

== Shareholders ==
As of 31 December 2016, the direct major shareholder (for 65.96%) of the listed company was HK incorporated "Founder Information (Hong Kong) Limited" (Chinese: 香港方正資訊有限公司), which were owned by PKU Resources Group Holdings (51%), Founder Group (46.36%) and Founder Commodities (2.64%) (as of May 2016), all non-wholly owned subsidiary of the Peking University. (Note: Founder Group was 70% owned by Peking University and 30% by the management board (via Chinese: 北京招润投资管理); Peking University Resources Group Holdings is owned by PKU Resources Group and Founder Group in a 51-49 ratio; Peking University Resources Group is 40% owned by Peking University; 30% owned by Founder Group and a minority shareholder (Chinese: 利德科技发展) for 30%.)

The second largest shareholder was Zheng Fu Shuang which he held 200,019,000 shares directly, and an additional 584,984,000 shares held by BVI-incorporated company Starry Nation Limited, which another BVI company, Shine Crest Group was the shareholder of Starry Nation; Zheng, owned 95% shares of Shine Crest Group. 100 million shares held by Starry Nation Limited were charged to Founder Information (HK). Zheng Fu Shuang was an executive director since September 2006. At first he owned all his stake (240,425,000 number of shares or 21.85%) via a British Virgin Islands incorporated company Shining Wisdom Group (Chinese: 亮智). The stake were acquired from the intermediate company of EC-Founder for HK$6.85 million (HK$0.285 per share).

The third largest shareholder was "Rongtong Ronghai No. 10 SNIA QDII" (Chinese: 融通融海10号（QDII）特定多个客户资产管理计划), a private equity fund based in mainland China, and managed by Rongtong Fund Management. The unit holders of the fund were not disclosed.
