= Jiangsu Sainty (company) =

Chinese clothing company

Jiangsu Sainty Corp., Ltd.
- Formerly: Sainty International Group Jiangsu Garments Imp. & Exp. Co., Ltd.
- Company type: Public
- Traded as: SSE: 600287
- ISIN: CNE0000014H8
- Industry: Manufacturing
- Predecessor: Jiangsu Garments Imp. & Exp. Corporation
- Founded: 28 December 1993; 32 years ago
- Headquarters: Nanjing, China
- Products: Clothing
- Brands: Sainty
- Net income: ▲CN¥83 million (2017)
- Total assets: ▼CN¥3.933 billion (2017)
- Total equity: ▼CN¥1.737 billion (2017)
Owner
Jiangsu Provincial Government (via Jiangsu Guoxin Group)	(49.97%)
- Number of employees: 2,526 (2017)
- Parent: Jiangsu Guoxin Group

Chinese name
- Simplified Chinese: 江苏舜天股份有限公司
- Traditional Chinese: 江蘇舜天股份有限公司
Transcriptions
Standard Mandarin
- Hanyu Pinyin: Jiāng sū shùn tiān gǔ fèn yǒu xiàn gōng sī

Chinese short name
- Simplified Chinese: 江苏舜天
- Traditional Chinese: 江蘇舜天
Transcriptions
Standard Mandarin
- Hanyu Pinyin: Jiāng sū shùn tiān
- Website: www.saintycorp.com
- Footnotes / references in consolidated financial statement

Jiangsu Sainty Corporation Limited is a Chinese listed company based in Nanjing, Jiangsu Province. The company exported clothes to overseas.

Jiangsu Sainty was majority owned by Jiangsu Sainty International Group. However, it was merged with fellow state-owned Jiangsu Guoxin Investment Group in 2010, becoming an intermediate holding company.

== History ==
Jiangsu Sainty Corporation Limited was incorporated in 1993 as a "company limited by shares" (Chinese: 股份有限公司; similar to public limited company), by transforming a state-owned enterprise namely 江苏省服装进出口（集团）公司 (literally Jiangsu Province Garments Import & Export (Group) Corporation). At that time employee owned a minority stake of the new legal person. In December 1996, a new intermediate holding company, Jiangsu Sainty International Group (Chinese: 江苏舜天国际集团) was formed. In the next year Jiangsu Garments Import & Export Co., Ltd. was renamed to [Jiangsu] Sainty International Group Jiangsu Garments Imp. & Exp. Co., Ltd. (Chinese: 江苏舜天国际集团服装进出口股份有限公司). It became a listed company in 2000. Before the initial public offering, Jiangsu Provincial Government, via Sainty International Group, owned 81.81% shares and was proposed to diluted to 60.38%.

In 2010, the parent company Sainty International Group was merged with fellow state-owned holding company Jiangsu Guoxin Group.

Jiangsu Sainty also acquired a significant stake of a financial leasing company 南京国际租赁 (now 江苏省国际租赁) from parent company Jiangsu Guoxin Group in 2013 (announced in 2012). However, in 2015 the stake was sold to a subsidiary of fellow state-owned enterprise Jiangsu Broadcasting Corporation.

== Controversies ==
In 2013 Securities Daily (Chinese: 证券日报) criticized Jiangsu Sainty had a large sum of prepayment to a former related parties. Jiangsu Sainty clarified that the prepayment to the business partner was part of a normal operation, despite that company was owned by a former employee of Jiangsu Sainty.
