= Founder Group =

Chinese State Owned Enterprise

- Company type: Government-owned corporation
- Industry: IT; Pharmaceuticals; Real estate Finance; Commodities trading
- Founded: 1986; 40 years ago
- Founder: Peking University; Wang Xuan
- Headquarters: Beijing, China
- Area served: Worldwide
- Revenue: 133,273,930,000 renminbi (2018)
- Owner: Peking University (70%); management board of Founder Group (30%)
- Number of employees: 35,000
- Parent: Peking University
- Subsidiaries: Founder Technology; PKU Resources Holdings; PKU Healthcare
- Website: founder.com

Founder Group (方正集团) is a major Chinese technology conglomerate that deals with information technology, pharmaceuticals, real estate, finance, and commodities trading. It is divided into five major industry groups, each covering a separate industry: PKU Founder IT Group (IT), PKU Healthcare Group (healthcare and pharmaceuticals), PKU Resource Group (real estate), Founder Financial (finance), and Founder Commodities (commodities trading). The group has been coping with bankruptcy since 2020, when the Beijing No.1 Intermediate People's Court announced the recognized leader during the restructuring.

The Founder Group was established by Peking University in 1986. It currently has six public companies listed in stock exchanges of Shanghai, Shenzhen, and Hong Kong, and more than 80 independently funded enterprises and joint ventures. Founder's motto is "世界在变 创新不变" (shì jiè zài biàn, chuàng xīn bu biàn), which roughly translates to "The world is changing; innovation is not". The company is currently moving to establish itself as a computer chip designer. Founder are also owners of the largest mall in the world, New South China Mall, acquired from Dongguan Sanyuan Yinghui Investment & Development which had run the mall extremely poorly.

== History ==
Founder Group was established in 1986 by Peking University. Professor Wang Xuan of Peking University became Founder's first key person, as the Chinese-character laser phototypesetting system that he invented provided the foundation on which Founder was developed. Wang brought Founder into the television and radio industries, positioned the company to expand overseas, and supported the diversification of the group. By 1989, total orders for the phototypesetting system exceeded 100 million yuan.

Between 1990 and 1994, under the guidance of Wang Xuan, Founder released multiple technologies, including a long-distance newspaper transfer technology, a color desktop publishing system, a computer management system for gathering and editing news, and the new generation of software and hardware systems. Founder's publishing system became the most popular product of its kind, capturing 80% of the Chinese newspaper market in Hong Kong, Southeast Asia, and North America.

Starting in 1991, Founder started developing Chinese PostScript fonts in Windows.

Throughout the late 1990s, publishing systems developed by Founder's researchers dominated the domestic market. Additionally, they entered the international market, with products being exported to dozens of countries all over the world. In the meantime, Founder Group sold its core technologies with independent intellectual rights to global manufacturers, who then applied these technologies in their products around the world.

In February 2006, professor Wang Xuan died.

In early 2009, the Group established a new three-year development strategy and put forward its development goal to transform itself into a diversified investment holding group.

In 2016 Founder Group sold most of the shares of Founder BEA Trust to Wuhan Financial Holdings Group.

In 2020, the Beijing No.1 Intermediate People's Court ruled out the recognized leader for restructuring five children companies of the group. After three years, the China Banking and Insurance Regulatory Commission principally agreed on the bankruptcy of the group's Founder Financial.

== Industry groups ==
Founder Group is currently divided into five major industry groups: PKU Founder IT Group (IT), PKU Healthcare Group (healthcare and pharmaceuticals), PKU Resource Group (real estate), Founder Financial (finance), and Founder Commodities (commodities trading).

=== PKU Founder IT Group ===
PKU Founder IT Group (北大方正信产集团) is a leader in China's IT industry, possessing more than a dozen technological enterprises, two of which employ 15,000 employees. Its subsidiary, Founder Technology, is the second largest personal computer distributor in China. The industry group covers a wide range of products; from software and industrial solutions to the mobile internet, PCB, semiconductors, hardware, and value-added services.

=== PKU Healthcare Group ===
In 2003, Founder Group, in collaboration with Peking University, established the PKU Healthcare Group (Chinese: 北大医疗产业集团), and immediately began work on the Peking University International Hospital project. In the same year, the Group acquired Southwest Synthetic Pharmaceutical (now PKU Healthcare). With the help of PKU Health Science Center, PKU Healthcare has developed its own hospital network and is now a leading figure in China's healthcare and pharmaceuticals industry.

As of 31 December 2015 PKU Healthcare Group owned 40.38% shares of PKU Healthcare (SZSE: 000788).

=== PKU Resource Group ===
PKU Resource Group (Chinese: 北大资源集团) is a real estate holding group specializing in real estate development, education investment, commercial real estate operations, and property management. Since 2013, part of the assets were backdoor listed as Peking University Resources (Holdings).

Incorporated in 1992, PKU Resource Group itself is currently 40% owned by Peking University and 30% by Founder Group. However, Peking University entrusted Founder Group to manage the company. An additional 30% was owned by a third party (Chinese: 利德科技发展).

PKU Resource Group formed a 51-49 joint venture PKU Resource Group Holdings with Founder Group.

=== Founder Financial ===
Founder Financial (方正金融) is an industry group that covers securities, futures, mutual funds, investment banking, direct investment, trusts, corporate financing, insurance, commercial banking, and leasing. The group controls ten enterprises.

=== Founder Commodities ===
Founder Commodities (方正物产) is an international bulk commodities supply chain provider that combines investment, manufacturing, logistics, and information services. Currently, its business scope mainly covers areas of bulk commodity futures & spot trading, warehousing & logistic services, and investment & production. The group also does international business and scale expansion.

=== Founder International ===
Founder International Software Co., Ltd. under Peking University Founder Information Industry Group Co., Ltd., pursues a development model integrating production, teaching, research with application, adheres to the path of independent innovation, and sets the goal of becoming a leading service provider of software and information technology.

== Financial performance ==
Founder Group earned 24.5 billion RMB (US$2.96 billion) in 2005. The total sales revenue of Founder Group reached 6.5 billion U.S. dollars in 2008. In 2012, Founder Group's total income, total assets and net assets were RMB 61.8 billion (US$9.9 billion), 78.2 billion (US$12.6 billion), and 32.4 billion (US$5.2 billion) respectively.

== See also ==
- List of computer system manufacturers
- Li Keqiang
- Li Yuanchao
