= Datong (disambiguation) =

Datong (大同市) is a prefecture-level city in Shanxi, China.

Datong (pinyin) or Tatung (Wade–Giles) may also refer to:

- Great Unity, a classical Chinese concept for an utopian view of the world

== Places ==
=== Counties ===
- Datong County, Shanxi (大同县), China
- Datong Hui and Tu Autonomous County (大通回族土族自治县), Qinghai, China

=== Districts ===
- Datong District, Daqing (大同区), Heilongjiang, China
- Datong District, Huainan (大通区), Anhui, China
- Datong District, Taipei (大同區), Taiwan

=== Towns ===
- Datong, Yilan (大同鄉), Taiwan

== Institutions and universities ==
- Shanxi Datong University, in Datong, Shanxi, China
- Tatung University, Taipei, Taiwan
- Tatung Institute of Commerce and Technology, in Chiayi County, Taiwan
- Utopia University, or Datong University, in Shanghai, China

== Companies and sport clubs ==
- Datong Coal Mining Group, state-owned coal mining enterprise of China
  - Datong Coal Industry, a subsidiary and listed company of Datong Coal Mining Group
- CRRC Datong, since 2003 'CNR Datong Electric Locomotive Co. Ltd' (DELC), in Datong, Shanxi, China
- SAIC Datong, Chinese name of the automotive manufacturer Maxus
- Tatung Company, Taiwanese electronics company
  - Tatung F.C., a Taiwanese football club owned by the company

== Chinese era names ==
- Datong (大通, 527–529), Emperor Wu of Liang's 3rd reign period
- Datong (大同, 535–546), Emperor Wu of Liang's 5th reign period
- Datong (大統, 535–551), an era name used by Emperor Wen of Western Wei
- Datong (大同, 947), an era name used by Emperor Taizong of Liao
- Datong (大同, 1224–1233), an era name used by Puxian Wannu
- Datong (大同, 1932–1934), an era name used by Puyi as Chief Executive of Manchukuo

== Other uses ==
- Datong (instrument), a Chinese music instrument
- The Chinese Mayor, original title Datong, documentary film
