= 大同 =

大同 may refer to:

- Great Unity, a classical Chinese concept for an utopian view of the world

== Places ==
=== Cities ===
- Datong, a prefecture-level city in Shanxi, China

=== Counties ===
- Datong County, Shanxi, China

=== Districts ===
- Datong District, Daqing, Heilongjiang, China
- Datong District, Taipei, Taiwan

=== Towns ===
- Datong, Yilan, Taiwan

== Institutions and universities ==
- Shanxi Datong University, in Datong, Shanxi, China
- Tatung University, Taipei, Taiwan
- Tatung Institute of Commerce and Technology, in Chiayi County, Taiwan
- Utopia University, or Datong University, in Shanghai, China

== Companies and sport clubs ==
- Datong Coal Mining Group, state-owned coal mining enterprise of China
  - Datong Coal Industry, a subsidiary and listed company of Datong Coal Mining Group
- CRRC Datong, since 2003 'CNR Datong Electric Locomotive Co. Ltd' (DELC), in Datong, Shanxi, China
- Tatung Company, Taiwanese electronics company
  - Tatung F.C., a Taiwanese football club owned by the company

== Historical eras ==
- Daidō, Japanese era name corresponding to May 806 through September 810
- Datong, Chinese era name corresponding to 535 through 546, used by Emperor Wu of Liang
- Datong, Chinese era name corresponding to 947, used by Emperor Taizong of Liao
- Datong, Chinese era name corresponding to 1224 through 1233, used by Puxian Wannu
- Datong, Chinese era name corresponding to 1932 through 1934, used by Puyi as Chief Executive of Manchukuo

== Other uses ==
- The Chinese Mayor, original title Datong, documentary film
