= China Coal =

China Coal may represent

- China National Coal Group, sometimes known as China Coal, the second largest coal mining enterprise in China, a state-owned enterprise.
  - China Coal Energy a subsidiary of China National Coal Group, a publicly traded company
- Coal power in China, the situation of coal power in People's Republic of China.
