= Taiyuan Coal Gasification Group =

Chinese state-owned coal company

Taiyuan Coal Gasification Group 太原煤炭气化（集团）有限责任公司
- Formerly: Taiyuan Coal Gasification Corp.
- Company type: state-owned enterprise
- Founded: 1981; 1998 (as limited company)
- Headquarters: 29 Heping South Road, Wanbailin District, Taiyuan, China
- Key people: He Tiancai (Chairman)
- Products: Coal, coal gas, coke; electricity (until 2012)
- Services: natural gas distribution network
- Revenue: ▼CN¥7.8 billion (2015)
- Operating income: ▼ (CN¥2.7 billion) (2015)
- Net income: ▼ (CN¥1.4 billion) (2015)
- Total assets: ▼CN¥25.9 billion (2015)
- Total equity: ▼ (CN¥437.8 million) (2015)
- Owner: Shanxi SASAC (51%); China Coal Group (35.39%); China Cinda (11.15%); China Huarong (2.46%)
- Parent: JAMG
- Footnotes / references in a consolidated basis

Taiyuan Coal Gasification (Group) Co., Ltd.
- Simplified Chinese: 太原煤炭气化(集团)有限责任公司
- Traditional Chinese: 太原煤炭氣化(集團)有限責任公司
Transcriptions
Standard Mandarin
- Hanyu Pinyin: Tàiyuán méitàn qìhuà (jítuán) yǒuxiàn zérèn gōngsī

Taiyuan Coal Gasification Group
- Simplified Chinese: 太原煤炭气化集团
- Traditional Chinese: 太原煤炭氣化集團
Transcriptions
Standard Mandarin
- Hanyu Pinyin: Tàiyuán méitàn qìhuà jítuán

Second alternative Chinese name
- Simplified Chinese: 太煤化
- Traditional Chinese: 太煤化
Transcriptions
Standard Mandarin
- Hanyu Pinyin: Tàiméihuà

Taiyuan Coal Gasification (Group) Co., Ltd. is a Chinese state-owned coal mining conglomerate based in Taiyuan, Shanxi. The company was owned by State-owned Assets Supervision and Administration Commission (SASAC) of Shanxi Provincial People's Government. However, Shanxi SASAC granted fellow state-owned enterprise Jincheng Anthracite Mining Group (JAMG) to manage their stake since 2011.

Taiyuan Coal Gasification Group was the largest shareholder of Taiyuan Coal Gasification Co., Ltd. (TCGC, Chinese: 太原煤气化股份有限公司 SZSE: 000968) for 49.45% stake until 2016. In September 2016 Taiyuan Coal Gasification Group sold 24.26% stake of the listed company to JAMG for CN¥856.13 million (CN¥6.87 per share). A backdoor listing was planned for a subsidiary (Chinese: 山西蓝焰煤层气集团有限责任公司; lit. 'Shanxi Blue Flame Coalbed Methane Group') of JAMG, which produces coal mine methane. The assets and liabilities of the listed company before 31 January 2016 would sold back to Taiyuan Coal Gasification Group.

In 2005 Taiyuan Coal Gasification Group was in the enterprise list in line with Coking Industry Access Condition (first batch) of the National Development and Reform Commission. According to a publication of the National Energy Administration, Taiyuan Coal Gasification Group had a coal mining capability of 6.25 million tons per year in 2015 (5.80 million tons for the listed company), despite the list was incomplete (number 156 to 163 mine of the list, except 159). The listed company had produced coal of 4.38 million tons in 2015, including raw coal, middling coal and refined coal.

According to Dagong Global Credit Rating, the group sold natural gas to citizen below the cost the group bought from other companies in 2015. The group was the natural gas and coal gas provider for Taiyuan (excluding Gujiao), Jinzhong and Linfen.

== History ==
=== Taiyuan Coal Gasification Group ===
Taiyuan Coal Gasification Corporation (Chinese: 太原煤炭气化总公司) was incorporated in 1981. In 1998 it was re-incorporated as a limited company as Taiyuan Coal Gasification (Group) Co., Ltd. under the new Company Law of China, with China Cinda Asset Management and China Huarong Asset Management became minority shareholders due to debt-to-equity swap. A subsidiary Taiyuan Coal Gasification Co., Ltd. was also incorporated on 22 December 1998, receiving a coal mine in Jialequan, Gujiao (Chinese: 嘉乐泉煤矿), a coal preparation plant (Chinese: 晋阳选煤厂) in the Wanbailin District, Taiyuan and a coking factory from the parent company, and became a publicly traded company (on Shenzhen Stock Exchange) in 2000. Taiyuan Coal Gasification Group retained an old coal gas factory and a coal mine (Chinese: 长沟煤矿) which produces low grade thermal coal with sulfur content >2% at that time. The group later sold several more assets to the public company. Although the group also bought back the coking factories in 2013 as they were forced to close down by the urban renewal of Taiyuan in 2012.

After a heavy net loss in 2015, all of the assets and liabilities of the listed company (mostly coal mines and other equity investments) would be sold back to the parent company in 2016, in order to allow Jincheng Anthracite Mining Group to backdoor listing a subsidiary in the stock exchange.

Taiyuan Coal Gasification Group also acquired Shanxi Shenlong Energy Coking Co., Ltd.(Chinese: 山西神龙能源焦化), a coking factory and the coal gas provider in Jinzhong in 2011, for CN¥301 million. Xuangang (a subsidiary of Tangsteel Group), the second largest shareholder of Shenlong Energy Coking, had invited company to make an offer for their 33.21% stake in 2007, for a base price of CN¥28.905 million.

=== Taiyuan Coal Gasification Company ===
Taiyuan Coal Gasification Co., Ltd. (Chinese: 太原煤气化股份有限公司) was incorporated on 22 December 1998 as Shanxi Shenzhou Coal Electricity Coking Co., Ltd. (Chinese: 山西神州煤电焦化股份有限公司), which produces coal and coke at that time. The capital raised by IPO was used to build a coal gas factory complex (Chinese: 太原城市煤气工程气源厂) as well as acquiring three additional coal mines: Luyukou (Chinese: 炉峪口), Donghe (Chinese: 东河, the group acquired it in 1999) from the parent company and Lishi (Chinese: 离石) from Shanxi Top Energy for CN¥64.37 million; The coal gas factory complex was a joint venture between the parent company and the listed company in a 53–47 ratio, which the parent company had leased their portion to the listed company in 2004 for CN¥78.60 million per year. The deal was renewed for a year in 2006. In 2007, the listed company acquired the factory from the parent company (The factory was also known as the number 2 coking factory (Chinese: 第二焦化厂), which coal gas was the by-product from producing coke) for CN¥516.3366 million, with the price of the land lease was converted to new shares. The listed company also acquired coal preparation plants (Chinese: 选/洗煤厂) in Lishi and Donghe from the parent company in 2006 (for CN¥37.9899 million) and 2007 (for CN¥29.1998 million). In 2008 a coal gangue thermal power station (Chinese: 煤矸石热电厂) was acquired from the parent company for CN¥222.1125 million.

In August 2012, the coal gangue thermal power station and the number 2 coking factory of the listed company were closed down due to urban renewal policy of Taiyuan. The number 1 coking factory had closed down in April 2012. Partially due to the closing down, the revenue of the company had decreased from CN¥3.8 billion in 2011 to CN¥3.3 billion in 2012, as the company no longer produce coke. In 2013 the listed company invested in a local railway company for CN¥309.2 million. In the same year the closed coking factories were sold back to the parent company for CN¥1.780 billion. Due to the fall in price of coal, and the closing of the coal preparation plant in the Wanbailin District (Chinese: 晋阳选煤厂), the revenue of the listed company had dropped even further to CN¥2.086 billion in 2013, CN¥1.724 billion in 2014 and CN¥1.655 billion in 2015. The net assets of the listed company were also decreased from CN¥2.763 billion in 2013 to just CN¥215.881 million in 2015.

As of 31 December 2015, despite the listed company retained the name "coal gasification", the listed company only produce coal as their product, which sold coal to Benxi Steel Group, Shandong Iron and Steel Company, Tangshan Yanshan Iron and Steel (Chinese: 唐山燕山钢铁), as well as sold to sister company Shanxi Shenlong Energy Coking as their top 4 customers (36.34% of the sales volume).

In 2016, a plan to sell all of the assets and liabilities at 31 January 2016 of the listed company to Taiyuan Coal Gasification Group was announced. At the same time the shell company would be used as a backdoor listing of a subsidiary of Jincheng Anthracite Mining Group (JAMG). JAMG already acquired 24.26% stake of the listed company from Taiyuan Coal Gasification Group before the finalization of the backdoor listing.

In April 2017 the backdoor listing and recapitalization was completed. JAMG became the largest shareholder for 40.05% shares. It was followed by the Taiyuan Coal Gasification Group for 13.38% and China Cinda Asset Management for 7.02%.

== Subsidiaries ==
As of 31 December 2015

- Taiyuan Natural Gas (97.25%)
- two coal mines in Qinghe, Gujiao (60%)
- Shanxi Shenlong Energy Coking Co., Ltd. (100%)
- Taiyuan Coal Gasification Group Real Estate Development (100%)

== Shareholders ==
In 2008 China National Coal Group (China Coal Group) was the largest shareholder of Taiyuan Coal Gasification Group. China Coal Group excluded Taiyuan Coal Gasification Group from injecting to listed company China Coal Energy due to Taiyuan Coal Gasification Group has provide coal gas to citizen in not-for-profit basis, as well as half the stake was held by other state-owned enterprise. China Coal Group later acquired 3.9% stake from China Cinda to become the controlling shareholder, but in 2013 16.18% stake was transferred to State-owned Assets Supervision and Administration Commission (SASAC) of Shanxi Provincial People's Government, making Shanxi SASAC became the largest shareholder, jumping from the second.

As of 31 December 2015

- State-owned Assets Supervision and Administration Commission (SASAC) of Shanxi Provincial People's Government (51%)
- State Council of the People's Republic of China
  - via SASAC
    - via wholly owned subsidiary China National Coal Group (35.39%)
  - via the Ministry of Finance
    - via subsidiary China Cinda Asset Management (11.15%)
    - via subsidiary China Huarong Asset Management (2.46%)

== Financial data ==
In Consolidated financial statements
Taiyuan Coal Gasification Group					Taiyuan Coal Gasification Company						
Year	Revenue	Net profit	Total assets	Equity	Group %	Revenue	Net profit	Profit to group	Total assets	Equity	Equity to group
2008	¥5.624 billion	¥225 million	¥7.3 billion	¥1.975 billion	49.45%	▲¥4.735 billion	▲¥684 million	▲¥338 million	▲¥4.815 billion	▲¥2.563 billion	▲¥1.267 billion
2009	▼¥4.305 billion	▼¥74 million	▲¥7.7 billion	▲¥2.095 billion	49.45%	▼¥3.248 billion	▼¥380 million	▼¥188 million	▲¥5.218 billion	▲¥2.795 billion	▲¥1.382 billion
2010	▲¥5.153 billion	▲¥92 million	▲¥9.9 billion	▲¥2.188 billion	49.45%	▲¥3.523 billion	▼¥234 million	▼¥116 million	▲¥6.672 billion	▲¥2.931 billion	▲¥1.449 billion
2011	▲¥6.487 billion	▼¥71 million	▲¥12.1 billion	▲¥2.320 billion	49.45%	▲¥3.779 billion	▼¥207 million	▼¥102 million	▲¥7.620 billion	▲¥3.160 billion	▲¥1.563 billion
2012	▲¥12.507 billion	▼ (¥270 million)	▲¥16.6 billion	▼¥2.082 billion	49.45%	▼¥3.312 billion	▼ (¥352 million)	▼ (¥174 million)	▲¥9.454 billion	▼¥2.710 billion	▼¥1.340 billion
2013	▲¥16.429 billion	▼ (¥551 million)	▲¥20.1 billion	▼¥1.539 billion	49.45%	▼¥2.086 billion	▲¥45 million	▲¥22 million	▲¥11.709 billion	▲¥2.763 billion	▲¥1.366 billion
2014	▼¥13.184 billion	▼ (¥570 million)	▲¥28.0 billion	▼¥979.2 million	49.45%	▼¥1.724 billion	▼ (¥995 million)	▼ (¥492 million)	▼¥15.431 billion	▼¥1.832 billion	▼¥906 million
2015	▼¥7.834 billion	▼ (¥1,418 million)	▼¥25.9 billion	▼ (¥437.8 million)	49.45%	▼¥1.655 billion	▼ (¥1.566 billion)	▼ (¥774 million)	▼¥12.504 billion	▼¥216 million	▼¥107 million

- Note: Net profit and equity were excluding minority interests
