= Shanxi Coking Coal Group =

Chinese coal mining conglomerate

- Native name: 山西焦煤集团有限责任公司
- Company type: state-owned enterprise
- Founded: 2001
- Headquarters: Taiyuan, China
- Products: Coal, coke and other chemicals
- Revenue: ▼CN¥195.1 billion (2015)
- Operating income: ▼ (CN¥429.1 million) (2015)
- Net income: ▲CN¥477.6 million (2015)
- Total assets: ▲CN¥261.0 billion (2015)
- Total equity: ▲CN¥25.9 billion (2015)
- Owner: Shanxi Government (100%)
- Parent: SASAC of Shanxi Government
- Subsidiaries: see list
- Website: sxcc.com.cn
- Footnotes / references in a consolidated basis

Shanxi Coking Coal Group Co., Ltd.
- Simplified Chinese: 山西焦煤集团有限责任公司
- Traditional Chinese: 山西焦煤集團有限責任公司
Transcriptions

Shanxi Coking Coal
- Simplified Chinese: 山西焦煤
- Traditional Chinese: 山西焦煤
Transcriptions

Second alternative Chinese name
- Simplified Chinese: 晋焦煤
- Traditional Chinese: 晉焦煤
- Literal meaning: Jin Coking Coal
Transcriptions

Shanxi Coking Coal Group Co., Ltd. is a Chinese state-owned coal mining conglomerate and a holding company, as one of the seven coal conglomerates that had a production capability of over 100 million metric tons in China in 2011. Shanxi Coking Coal Group was ranked 337th in 2016 Fortune Global 500.

The company was owned by the State-owned Assets Supervision and Administration Commission (SASAC) of Shanxi Provincial People's Government, which Shanxi SASAC injected several provincial government owned companies into the holding company in order to centralize the production of coal and coke in one business group.

The holding company is the parent of three publicly traded companies: Nafine Chemical Industry Group, Shanxi Coking Company and Xishan Coal and Electricity Power.

As of 31 December 2015, Shanxi Coking Coal Group had a mining capability of 86.9 million metric tons per year, according to National Energy Administration, with some capability were not disclosed, such as Shaqu mine (Chinese: 沙曲矿) of Huajin Coking Coal.

In 2011 Shanxi Coking Coal Group is the largest Chinese miner for coking coal (metallurgical coal). According to the company, the group produced 105.35 million tons of coal and 9.62 million tons of coke, plus 13 billion kWh of electricity in 2015. According to the International Energy Agency, Shanxi Coking Coal Group was ranked 4th in 2006 in China by sales mass of coal.

== History ==
Shanxi Coking Coal Group was found in 2001 as the holding company of Fenxi Mining Industry Group, Xishan Coal Electricity Group and Huozhou Coal Electricity Group. The stake of Xishan Coal and Electricity Power was also acquired from Xishan Coal Electricity Group in 2001. The group also formed a joint venture Huajin Coking Coal in the same year. In 2004, Shanxi Coking Coal Group became the parent company of Shanxi Coking Group. It was followed by Yuncheng Salt Group in 2012 and Shanxi Coke Group in 2013.

=== Fenxi Mining Industry Group ===
Fenxi Mining Industry (Group) Co., Ltd. (Chinese: 汾西矿业(集团)有限责任公司), based in Fenxi County, Linfen, was founded in 1956 as Fenxi Mining Bureau (Chinese: 汾西矿务局). In 2000 it was incorporated as a limited company. It became part of Shanxi Coking Coal Group in 2001. In 2005 China Construction Bank, China Cinda Asset Management and China Huarong Asset Management became minority shareholders by debt-to-equity swap.

=== Huajin Coking Coal ===
Huajin Coking Coal Co., Ltd. (Chinese: 华晋焦煤有限责任公司) was incorporated in 2001 as a 50-50 joint venture of Shanxi Coking Coal Group and China Coal Energy. In 2011, "Shanxi China Coal Huajin Energy" (Chinese: 山西中煤华晋能源有限责任公司) was split from the company. Both companies recapitalized, which Huajin Coking Coal was under Shanxi Coking Coal Group for 51% stake, while Huajin Energy was under China Coal Energy for 51% stake.

In 2014 the 49% minority stake in "Huajin Energy" was injected to group's wholly owned subsidiary Shanxi Coking Group. In April 2016 it was announced it would sold to listed subsidiary Shanxi Coking in a cash plus new shares deal.

=== Huozhou Coal Electricity Group ===
Huozhou Coal Electricity Group Co., Ltd. (Chinese: 霍州煤电集团有限责任公司) was founded in 1958 in Huozhou, Linfen as Huo Country Mining Bureau (Chinese: 霍县矿务局; Huo Country became Huozhou in 1989). In 2000 it was incorporated as a limited company. It became part of Shanxi Coking Coal Group in 2001.

As of 31 December 2015, the other shareholders were China Construction Bank and China Cinda Asset Management. They acquired the stake by debt-to-equity swap.

=== Shanxi Coke Group ===
Shanxi Coke Group Co., Ltd. (Chinese: 山西省焦炭集团有限责任公司) was founded in 2002. The company specialized in coke and methanol making. It became part of Shanxi Coking Coal Group in 2013, transferred from Shanxi Coal Transportation and Sales Group.

=== Shanxi Coking Group ===
Shanxi Coking Group Co., Ltd. (Chinese: 山西焦化集团有限公司) based in Hongtong County, Linfen, was founded in 1969 as Hongtong Coking Factory. In 1995, a subsidiary, Shanxi Coking Company, was formed to float the coke making factory in the stock exchange. The other assets remained unlisted. Shanxi Coking Group became a wholly own subsidiary of Shanxi Coking Coal Group in 2004. In 2005 Shanxi Coking Group sold 24.19% stake of the listed company to another subsidiary of Shanxi Coking Coal Group: Xishan Coal and Electricity Power for CN¥260 million (CN¥4.87 per share).

In 2014 Shanxi Coking Group received 49% stake of Huajin Energy from the parent company; the stake would be sell to Shanxi Coking for cash and new shares, as announced in April 2016.

=== Xishan Coal Electricity Group ===
Xishan Coal Electricity (Group) Co., Ltd. was founded in 1956 as Xishan Mining Bureau (Chinese: 西山矿务局). In 1998 the organization was incorporated as a limited company. In 1999 a subsidiary Xishan Coal and Electricity Power was incorporated and floated on Shenzhen Stock Exchange in 2000. Xishan Coal Electricity Group became a subsidiary of Shanxi Coking Coal Group in 2001. The stake in the listed company was also transferred from Xishan Coal Electricity Group to the parent company that year.

== Subsidiaries ==
As of 31 December 2015

- Fenxi Mining Industry Group (59.45%)
- Huajin Coking Coal (51%)
- Huozhou Coal Electricity Group (58.80%)
- Shanxi Coking Group (100%)
  - Shanxi Coking Company (combined 25.72% voting rights with Xishan Coal and Electricity Power)
- Shanxi Coke Group (100%)
- Xishan Coal Electricity Group (52.34%)
- Xishan Coal and Electricity Power (54.40%)
- Yuncheng Salt Group (82.51%)
  - Nafine Chemical Industry Group (25.69%)

== See also ==
- 2009 Shanxi mine blast
