= Wei Pengyuan =

Chinese politician sentenced to death for bribery in 2014

- 魏鹏远

National Energy Administration (2008-2014)

Personal details
- Born: November 20, 1959 (age 66) Liaoning, Huludao
- Party: Chinese Communist Party
- Education: Liaoning Technical University, Fuxin Mining Institute

Wei Pengyuan (Chinese: 魏鹏远; born November 20, 1959), from Liaoning province Huludao city, was a former Chinese politician who was sentenced to death in 2016 for corruption, bribery, and hoarding more than 200 million yuan (around $30 million USD) in cash. Wei had served in the National Development and Reform Commission, and his corruption case was one of the largest in China's history, creating a record in cash assets seized at the time.

In total, Wei accumulated 300 million yuan in embezzled funds.

== Biography ==
Wei Pengyuan graduated from Fuxin Mining Institute (阜新矿业学院), now Liaoning Technical University. After graduation, he successively worked in the Beijing Coal Design Institute, the Planning Department of the Ministry of Coal Industry, the Industry Planning Department of the State Economic and Trade Commission, the Basic Industry Department of the State Planning Commission, and the Coal Division of the Energy Bureau of the National Development and Reform Commission.

=== Coal department ===
Wei worked for the Coal Department of the National Development and Reform Commission (NDRC) for a long time.

In 2008, the National Energy Administration (NEA) of the NDRC was established, and Wei became deputy director of the Coal Department in the NEA. The agency was in charge of economic planning. Around the same time, Hao Weiping (郝卫平) became deputy director of the Nuclear Power Department. Later both Wei Pengyuan and Hao Weiping would be detained by authorities for corruption around the same time.

At the NEA, Wei's responsibilities included coal mining project approval, contracting, and infrastructure. However, there were a lot of problems with Wei and his processes. Since 2013, Wei and the NEA approved reconstruction projects in the Qinghai Yuka mining area (青海鱼卡矿区鱼卡一井) and the Shanxi Liliu mining area (山西离柳矿区沙曲一号矿井).

In September 2011, Wei publicly announced that joint ventures between coal and energy would be encouraged and would be a long-term policy. Moreover, Wei said such joint ventures would be given special treatment in terms of project review and approval. Since then, the Shanxi provincial government issued the "Implementation Plan for Promoting the Coordinated Development of Coal and Power Enterprises in Shanxi Province" (山西省促进煤炭电力企业协调发展实施方案) and set up a leading group for the coordinated development of coal and power enterprises to promote joint operations. Afterwards, several transactions were facilitated, such as Shanxi Tongmei Group (山西同煤集团) investing in China Power Investment Corporation Zhangze Power (中电投漳泽电力), the strategic reorganization of Shanxi Coal Transportation and Sales Group (山西煤炭运销集团) and Shanxi International Power (山西国际电力), the transfer of equity to Shanxi Xishan Coal Electricity Co., Ltd. (山西西山煤电股份有限公司) by Shanxi Hexin Electric Power Development Co., Ltd. (山西和信电力发展有限公司), affiliated with Huadian.

Wei's last public activity was on January 9, 2014, when he went to inspect the Daizhuang coal mine (岱庄煤矿) along with Qiao Naichen (乔乃琛), director of the Shandong Provincial Coal Industry Bureau, and nine leaders from the Department of Environment and Resources (NDRC) and the Department of Taxation and Administration of the Ministry of Finance.

=== Investigation ===
In May 2014, Wei was put under investigation for corruption. Investigators seized a stash of 212 million yuan at Wei's home. It was the largest found in any corruption case in Chinese history. The stash included both Chinese renminbi and foreign currency. The apartment only had a single bed and no other furniture.

Wei had bought several apartments and flats to store the piles of cash. Later, another criminal Lai Xiaomin, executed for bribery, would use a similar method to store his illegally gained cash.

There was so much cash that investigators had to borrow cash-counting machines from the bank when four out of 16 of their own machines broke from being unable to handle the excess load. The machines that got burned out could process 1000 bills per minute. Other corrupt officials whose bribes were so large that they burned out cash-counting machines include Ou Lingao (欧林高), Huang Yihui (黄亦辉), and Liu Zhijun.

In total the stockpile of over 200 million yuan in cash weighed more than 2.2 tons, and if stacked vertically in 100 yuan notes, the pile would reach 200 meters, equivalent to nearly two-thirds the height of the Eiffel Tower (324 meters). The 100 yuan note is the largest-denomination Chinese bill in circulation.

Wei admitted to taking over 200 million yuan in bribes, but failed to account for another 131 million yuan in his assets. When stacked in a pile, the total of more than 300 million yuan Wei took in bribes would reach 300 meters, close to the height of the Eiffel Tower, while surpassing the height of the CCTV Headquarters, Big Ben, and Taj Mahal.

According to the Beijing Youth Daily, if the stash was laid end to end in 100 yuan notes, it would reach 96 miles, equal to the sum of the lengths of Beijing's 3rd Ring Road and 5th Ring Road. Although it was not officially disclosed how exactly Wei transported his cash, the Beijing Youth Daily stated that Wei might have used suitcases (and would have needed at least 32).

It was estimated that Wei earned an average of 100,000 per day during the six years he worked in the NEA.

Wei has been compared to other criminals convicted of corruption and taking massive amounts of bribes, including Bo Xilai who was sentenced to life in prison and took 20 million yuan in bribes; Liu Zhijun who was sentenced to death and took 60 million yuan in bribes; Ni Fake who was sentenced to 17 years in prison and took 13 million yuan in bribes; and Li Daqiu who was sentenced to 15 years in prison and took 11 million in bribes.

=== Death sentence ===
On October 17, 2016, the Intermediate People's Court of Baoding City in Hebei sentenced Wei to death for abusing his power for coal projects and taking 212 million in bribes. The 212 million far exceeded his net income. From 2000 to 2014, he illegally accepted those bribes to help businesses obtain coal mining licenses. Wei's corruption was unprecedented and caused severe losses for the state and Chinese people. Xu Jinhui (徐进辉) of the Supreme People's Procuratorate (SPP) was in charge of prosecuting Wei to death.

== NDRC scandal ==
Wei was one of 11 officials from the NDRC to be charged with bribery. This included 5 people from the NEA, 5 people from the Price Department, and one person from the Employment and Income Distribution Department of the NDRC. The director of the Nuclear Power Department (Hao Weiping), the deputy director of the Electric Power Department, the deputy director of the Coal Department, the former director of the Price Department, and most of the leadership of the Price Department were also suspected of duty-related crimes. The anti-corruption bureau of the SPP investigated Beijing, Hebei, Heilongjiang, and other provinces for Wei's case and others.

With the rise in the price of coal, the coal-mining industry and NDRC became rife grounds for rampant corruption. Moreover, the departments had too much power on their own, easily inducing corruption. Most of the people investigated and prosecuted were not only macro policy makers, but also approvers of specific projects. They could directly determine and control the interests of many enterprises. Many people sought help from them, which easily bred corruption. Second, there were loopholes in the management and supervision mechanism, including lack of supervision, opaque operation of approval power, and lack of effective internal and external supervision mechanisms. Third, taking money to do things had become the unspoken rule of Wei and his associates. Wei and his cronies tacitly accepted bribes together for a long time, forming a nest of cases, leading to an unprecedented scale in crime.

=== Purge of Wei's associates ===
Wei was a subordinate of Xu Yongsheng, a deputy administrator of the NEA. Xu was also charged with corruption and detained by authorities. In May 2014, Hao Weiping (郝卫平), another NEA politician, was detained for corruption. Hao Weiping's wife Liu Mou (刘某) was taken away as well. Song Lin, the chairman of China Resources group, was also detained for graft around the same time as Wei and Xu.

The head of the energy administration, Liu Tienan, was also sentenced to life in prison for corruption and taking 36 million yuan in bribes. Wei, Xu, Liu abused their power in policymaking, approval of projects, and deciding how much profit a company could make. Wei's case escalated into a purge of 14 central enterprises and 7 energy companies, resulting in the investigation of party committee secretary Zhu Changlin as well.

Wei and Liu's case was part of Xi Jinping's anti-corruption campaign to root out 'tigers' and 'flies' alike, targeting both senior and junior officials. In 2014, the same year Wei was detained, Xu Caihou was arrested for a similar crime, and 12 trucks were used to haul away all the bribes Xu had accumulated. It took a week to count all the cash Xu had. The cash was packaged in boxes with the names of each soldier who had paid the bribe in exchange for promotion. Moreover, Ma Chaoqun was charged with graft and used a similar method as Wei to store over 100 million in bribes in his flats.

Around the same time, Zhou Yongkang was sentenced to life in prison, while Zhou's lackey Liu Wei was given the death penalty and executed for running a mafia. The anti-corruption campaign was also part of an overseas manhunt that targeted and captured officials who had fled abroad.

== Culture ==
It is said that Zhao Dehan (赵德汉) of the TV series In the Name of the People is based on the real-life Wei Pengyuan. Chinese state television also broadcast footage of Wei's stash of 200 million yuan in bribes found at his apartment.

== See also ==
- Li Jianping, sentenced to death for corruption
- Lai Xiaomin, executed for corruption
- Liu Tienan, energy administration head sentenced to life in prison
- Xu Yongsheng, Wei's manager, charged with corruption
- Song Lin, charged with graft in related case
