= Jinneng Holding Equipment Manufacturing Group =

Chinese state-owned coal mining company

Jincheng Anthracite Mining Group
- Trade name: Chinese: 晋煤集团; lit. 'Jin Coal Group'
- Type: State-owned enterprise
- Industry: Energy and chemical
- Predecessor: Jincheng Mining Bureau
- Founded: 1958 (as mining bureau); 2000 (as limited company)
- Headquarters: Jincheng, China
- Area served: China
- Key people: He Tiancai (Chairman & Party Committee Secretary)
- Products: Anthracite, coal mine methane, electricity
- Revenue: ▲CN¥194.1 billion (2014); ▼CN¥173.3 billion (2015)
- Operating income: ▼ (CN¥384 million) (2014); ▼ (CN¥1,033 million) (2015)
- Net income: ▼CN¥608.5 million (2014); ▼ (CN¥966.9 million) (2015)
- Total assets: ▲CN¥210.2 billion (2014); ▲CN¥211.8 billion (2015)
- Total equity: ▲CN¥24.4 billion (2014); ▼CN¥23.3 billion (2015)
- Owner: SASAC of Shanxi (62.570%); China Development Bank (20.364%); China Cinda (17.066%)
- Number of employees: 142,741 (2015)
- Parent: Jinneng Holding Group
- Subsidiaries: JAMG International Trading (100%)

Chinese name
- Simplified Chinese: 晋能控股装备制造集团有限责任公司
- Traditional Chinese: 晉能控股裝備製造集團有限責任公司
Transcriptions
Standard Mandarin
- Hanyu Pinyin: Shānxī Jìnchéng Wúyānméi Kuàngyè Jítuán Yǒuxiàn Zérèn Gōngsī

Jinneng Holding Equipment Manufacturing Group
- Simplified Chinese: 晋能控股装备制造集团
- Traditional Chinese: 晉能控股裝備製造集團
- Literal meaning: Jincheng Coal Industry Group
Transcriptions
Standard Mandarin
- Hanyu Pinyin: Jìnchéng Méi Yè Jítuán

Second alternative Chinese name
- Simplified Chinese: 晋煤集团
- Traditional Chinese: 晉煤集團
- Literal meaning: Jin Coal Group
Transcriptions
Standard Mandarin
- Hanyu Pinyin: Jìn Méi Jítuán
- Footnotes in a consolidated basis (2014 figures restated)

Jinneng Holding Equipment Manufacturing Group Company Limited, formerly name Shanxi Jincheng Anthracite Mining Group Co., Ltd. (JAMG) is a Chinese state-owned coal mining conglomerate based in Jincheng, Shanxi. It was owned by the State-owned Assets Supervision and Administration Commission (SASAC) of Shanxi Provincial People's Government. JAMG was ranked 386th in 2016 Fortune Global 500. The company also known as Jin Coal Group (Chinese: 晋煤集团) in China, which "Jin" was the short name of both Jincheng and Shanxi Province, as both named after the ancient Jin. Jincheng was located in one of the 13 important coal mining sites of China, namely "Jin East", which fellow state-owned enterprise Yangquan Coal Industry Group and Lu'an Mining Industry Group were also located in "Jin East".

According to a publication of the National Energy Administration, JAMG had a coal mining capability of 54.55 million tons in 2015, despite the list was incomplete. (The figure also included the mines from Taiyuan Coal Gasification Group.) According to the company itself, the company produced 70.4 million tons of coal in 2015.

According to the International Energy Agency, JAMG was ranked 11th in 2006 in China by sales mass. According to UNESCO, the group had one of the representative coal gasification plant in China in 2007, with an output of 100,000 tons. The group also had the world largest coal mine methane power plant of 120 MegaWatts, at the Sihe Mine (Chinese: 寺河矿). The engine of the power plant was constructed by Caterpillar and the project was partly financed by a loan from Asia Development Bank and the Prototype Carbon Fund that was managed by the World Bank.

== History ==
Shanxi Jincheng Anthracite Mining Group was founded in 1958 as Jincheng Mining Bureau. In 2000 it was incorporated as a limited company. In 2011 Shanxi SASAC entrusted JAMG to manage Taiyuan Coal Gasification Group.

In 2016 JAMG acquired 24.26% stake of Taiyuan Coal Gasification Co., Ltd., a listed subsidiary of Taiyuan Coal Gasification Group for CN¥856.13 million (CN¥6.87 per share). A backdoor listing was planned for a subsidiary (Chinese: 山西蓝焰煤层气集团有限责任公司; pinyin: Shānxī lányàn méicéngqì jítuán yǒuxiàn zérèn gōngsī; lit. 'Shanxi Blue Flame Coalbed Methane Group') of JAMG, which produces coal mine methane. The listed company would acquire the subsidiary by paying cash and issuing new shares to JAMG. The assets of coal gas would sold back from the listed company to Taiyuan Coal Gasification Group. After the deal, JAMG would owned the listed company for 49.89%, followed by Taiyuan Coal Gasification Group for 16.66%. Additional new shares would be issued to other parties in order to dilute the effect of aforementioned deal, which JAMG and Taiyuan Coal Gasification Group may owned 40.05% and 13.38% stake respectively, with new investors owned 20%.

In 2020 the company became a subsidiary of the consolidated Jinneng Holding Group, merging six companies including the Datong Coal Mining Group.

== Shareholders ==
As of 31 December 2015, the shareholders of JAMG were the State-owned Assets Supervision and Administration Commission (SASAC) of Shanxi Provincial People's Government, China Development Bank (via a wholly owned subsidiary) and China Cinda Asset Management. The latter acquired the stake by debt-to-equity swap. On 29 January 2015 JAMG bought back 3.61% stake from China Construction Bank. The treasury stock was than canceled in mid-2015.
