= Liu Baohua =

Former Chinese politician

- 刘宝华

Deputy Director of National Energy Administration
- In office August 2017 – 5 November 2020
- Director: Nur Bekri→Zhang Jianhua.

Personal details
- Born: August 1963 (age 63) Ningjin County, Hebei, China
- Party: Chinese Communist Party
- Education: Beijing Normal University; Hebei University; North China Electric Power University; Central Party School of the Chinese Communist Party

Chinese name
- Traditional Chinese: 劉寶華
- Simplified Chinese: 刘宝华
Transcriptions
Standard Mandarin
- Hanyu Pinyin: Liú Bǎohuá

Liu Baohua (Chinese: 刘宝华; born August 1963) is a former Chinese politician. He was investigated by China's top anti-graft agency in October 2020. Previously he served as deputy director of National Energy Administration.

== Biography ==
Liu was born in Ningjin County, Hebei, in August 1963. He entered the workforce in January 1984, and joined the Chinese Communist Party in October 1985. He earned his master's degree in education from Beijing Normal University and Hebei University. He was a doctoral candidate at North China Electric Power University. He successively worked at the Ministry of Water Resources and Electric Power, Ministry of Energy Resources, and Ministry of Electric Power between January 1984 and July 1998. Then he worked at the State Economic and Trade Commission. In March 2003 he became the deputy director of the Market Regulation Department of State Electricity Regulatory Commission, rising to director a few years later. In June 2013, he was appointed director of the Market Supervision Department of National Energy Administration. One year later, he was transferred as director of its Department of Nuclear Power. He rose to become deputy director of National Energy Administration in August 2017, serving as an assistant of Nur Bekri and then Zhang Jianhua.

=== Investigation ===
On October 17, 2020, he has been placed under investigation for serious violations of laws and regulations by the Central Commission for Discipline Inspection (CCDI), the party's internal disciplinary body, and the National Supervisory Commission, the highest anti-corruption agency of China. On November 5, the State Council removed Liu from the post of deputy director of National Energy Administration.

In December 2019, the National Energy Administration director Nur Bekri was sentenced to life in prison after being found guilty of accepting more than US$11 million in bribes over a 20-year period.

On March 16, 2022, he received a sentence of 13 years in prison and fine of three million yuan for corruption, and his illegal gains will be confiscated.
