= Datong District =

Datong District may refer to the following locations in mainland China or Taiwan:

- Datong District, Daqing (大同区), Heilongjiang
- Datong District, Huainan (大通区), Anhui
- Datong District, Taipei (大同區), Taiwan
