= Shanxi Coking Company =

Chinese coke manufacturing conglomerate

Shanxi Coking 山西焦化集团有限公司
- Company type: public
- Traded as: SSE: 600740
- Industry: Coal
- Founded: 23 October 1995
- Founder: Shanxi Coking Group
- Headquarters: Hongtong County, Linfen, China
- Products: Coke, methanol and coal related products
- Revenue: ▼CN¥3.4 billion (2015)
- Operating income: ▼ (CN¥773.0 million) (2015)
- Net income: ▼ (CN¥830.2 million) (2015)
- Total assets: ▼CN¥10.6 billion (2015)
- Total equity: ▼CN¥2.0 billion (2015)
- Owner: Shanxi Coking Group (14.22%); Xishan Coal & Electricity Power (11.50%); China Fortune Trust (8.36%)
- Footnotes / references in a consolidated basis

Shanxi Coking Co., Ltd.
- Simplified Chinese: 山西焦化股份有限公司
- Traditional Chinese: 山西焦化股份有限公司
- Literal meaning: Shanxi Coking Company Limited by Shares
Transcriptions
Standard Mandarin
- Hanyu Pinyin: Shānxī jiāohuà gǔfèn yǒuxiàn gōngsī

Shanxi Coking
- Simplified Chinese: 山西焦化
- Traditional Chinese: 山西焦化
Transcriptions
Standard Mandarin
- Hanyu Pinyin: Shānxī Jiāohuà

Shanxi Coking Co., Ltd. (SCC) is a publicly traded coke manufacturing conglomerate in China. The company was listed on Shanghai Stock Exchange.

In 2015 Shanxi Coking had sold 3.25 million tons of coke, 233.9 thousand tons of methanol, 62.4 thousand tons of carbon black, 91.9 thousand tons of asphalt and 14.9 thousand tons of coking toluene (Chinese: 焦化甲苯). The listed company also had a massive related deal with its largest shareholder Shanxi Coking Coal Group, which purchased CN¥2.1 billion of coal from the company in 2015.

== History ==
Shanxi Coking Co., Ltd. was incorporated on 23 October 1995 as company limited by shares, as a subsidiary of Shanxi Coking Group (Chinese: 山西焦化集团). On 8 August 1996, the shares of the company started to float on Shanghai Stock Exchange. In 2001 the parent company merged with other companies to form Shanxi Coking Coal Group (Chinese: 山西焦煤集团). In 2005 Shanxi Coking Group sold 24.19% stake of the listed company to Xishan Coal and Electricity Power (Chinese: 西山煤电股份) another listed company and subsidiary of Shanxi Coking Coal Group for CN¥260 million (CN¥4.87 per share). After the deal Shanxi Coking Group owned 34.15% stake and Xishan Coal & Electricity Power owned 24.19% stake. After several capital increases, Shanxi Coking Group owned 14.22% stake and Xishan Coal & Electricity Power owned 11.50% stake only.

A backdoor listing of 49% equity stake in Huajin Energy (Chinese: 山西中煤华晋能源有限责任公司) was announced in April 2016 by issuing new shares and cash to acquire from Shanxi Coking Group. The rest of the stake was owned by another listed company (and competitor) China Coal Energy. After the deal, Shanxi Coking Coal Group would owned 47.87% stake of the listed company via wholly owned subsidiary Shanxi Coking Group and 5.27% stake via subsidiary Xishan Coal and Electricity Power.

According to China Coal Energy, Huajin Energy produced 9.95 million tonnes of coal in 2015, accounted for 10.4% total production mass of China Coal Energy.

== Shareholders ==
As of 31 December 2015, Shanxi Coking Group owned 14.22% stake as the largest shareholder. It was followed by Xishan Coal and Electricity Power (11.50%), both subsidiary of Shanxi Coking Coal Group.
