= Datong Coal =

Datong Coal may represent the following:

- Datong Coal Mining Group: a state-owned coal-mining enterprise in the People's Republic of China.
- Datong Coal Industry Company Limited: a subsidiary and listed company of Datong Coal Mining Group.
