= Datong University =

Datong University may refer to:

- Shanxi Datong University, in Datong, Shanxi
- Tatung University, Taipei
- Utopia University, or Datong University, Shanghai
