= Xishan Coal Electricity Group =

Chinese coal company

Xishan Coal Electricity Group 西山煤电（集团）有限责任公司
- Type: subsidiary
- Industry: Coal
- Founded: 1956; 1998 (as limited company)
- Headquarters: Wanbailin District, Taiyuan, China
- Area served: China
- Products: Coal, coke, electricity and cement
- Revenue: ▼CN¥78.5 billion (2015)
- Net income: ▼ (CN¥148.7 million) (2015)
- Total assets: ▲CN¥90.5 billion (2015)
- Total equity: ▼CN¥10.0 billion (2015)
- Owner: Shanxi Coking Coal Group (52.34%); China Cinda (35.47%); Construction Bank (6.52%); Orient Asset Management (5.67%)
- Number of employees: 81,393 (2015)
- Parent: Shanxi Coking Coal Group
- Divisions: 30 divisions
- Subsidiaries: 32 subsidiaries
- Footnotes in a consolidated basis; net profit including minority interests.

Xishan Coal Electricity (Group) Co., Ltd.
- Simplified Chinese: 西山煤电(集团)有限责任公司
- Traditional Chinese: 西山煤電(集團)有限責任公司
Transcriptions

Xishan Coal Electricity (Group) Co., Ltd. is a subsidiary of state-owned coal and coke conglomerate Shanxi Coking Coal Group (for 52.34% stake). The subsidiary is based in Taiyuan, Shanxi.

The company was the parent company of listed company Xishan Coal and Electricity Power. However, in 2001 all the stake were transferred to its parent company Shanxi Coking Coal Group.

Claimed by the subsidiary itself, the subsidiary is China's largest and the world's second largest coking coal production enterprise; It involves coal mining and processing, coal mining machine manufacturing, and electricity equipment repair.

In 2015 Xishan Coal Electricity Group produced 47.50 million tons of coal, 5.471 million tons of coke and 12.09 billion kWh of electricity.

== History ==
Xishan Coal Electricity (Group) Co., Ltd. was founded in 1956 as Xishan Mining Bureau (Chinese: 西山矿务局). In 1998 the organization was incorporated as a limited company. In 1999 a subsidiary Xishan Coal and Electricity Power was incorporated and floated on Shenzhen Stock Exchange in 2000. The listed subsidiary received 3 mines in Gujiao from the group (Chinese: 西曲矿,马兰矿, 镇城底矿) as well as three corresponding coal preparation plants (Chinese: 选煤厂). The capital raised from the IPO was used to acquire 1 additional mine (Chinese: 西铭矿) and two factories from Xishan Coal Electricity Group.

Xishan Coal Electricity Group became a subsidiary of Shanxi Coking Coal Group in 2001. The stake in the listed company was also transferred from Xishan Coal Electricity Group to the parent company that year.

In 2009, one of the mine (Chinese: 屯兰煤矿) of Xishan Coal Electricity Group in Gujiao had a pre-dawn explosion. In the same year, a coking factory (Chinese: 西山煤气化; lit. 'Xishan Coal Gasification') which produce coke and coal gas was sold to the listed company. The factory was the only provider of coal gas in Gujiao.

Some of the mines of Xishan Coal Electricity Group was not injected to the listed company, such as two mines in Gujiao (aforementioned mine with 2009 mine blast and Chinese: 东曲矿). According to Xishan Coal Electricity Group, they were located in 3 different area. (Xishan, River East, West Huo Chinese: 西山,河东, 霍西) but according to the publication of the National Energy Administration of China, the production capability per year for three mines (Chinese: 德顺煤业, 亚辰煤业, 晟聚煤业) were disclosed with a capability of just 1.8 million tons of coal per year in 2015. Moreover, the two mines in Gujiao, which had a combined 9 million tons capability per year, were listed under parent company Shanxi Coking Coal Group instead. However, the list of National Energy Administration was incomplete, which may not reflected the true situation.

== Equity investments ==
Xishan Coal Electricity Group was also the minority shareholder of the Coca-Cola bottler in Shanxi (as in 2015). (Coca-Cola (Shanxi))

== Shareholders ==
The other shareholders of Xishan Coal Electricity Group were China Construction Bank, China Cinda Asset Management and China Orient Asset Management. They acquired the stake by debt-to-equity swap.
