= China United =

China United may refer to:

- China United Airlines
- China United Coalbed Methane
- China Unicom
