= Xu Yongsheng =

Chinese politician

Xu Yongsheng 许永盛

Deputy Director of the National Energy Administration
- In office December 2012 – May 2014

Personal details
- Born: March 1966 (age 60) Fei County, Shandong
- Party: Chinese Communist Party
- Education: Tianjin University
- Occupation: Politician

Xu Yongsheng
- Traditional Chinese: 許永盛
- Simplified Chinese: 许永盛
Transcriptions
Standard Mandarin
- Hanyu Pinyin: Xǔ Yǒngshèng

Xu Yongsheng (born March 1966) is a former Chinese public official, and former deputy director of the National Energy Administration. In May 2014 he was investigated by the Communist Party's disciplinary body for corruption.

== Life ==
Xu was born and raised in Fei County, Shandong, he received his MBA degree from Tianjin University in 1987.

Xu joined the Chinese Communist Party in December 1985 and got involved in politics in July 1987.

After college, Xu was assigned to State Planning Commission as an officer. In July 2003, Xu was transferred to the National Development and Reform Commission, he worked in there until August 2008, when he was appointed the Director-general of the Department of Electric Power of the National Energy Administration. In December 2012, Xu was promoted to become the deputy director of the National Energy Administration.

On May 23, 2014, Xu was being investigated by the Central Commission for Discipline Inspection for "serious violations of laws and regulations". On May 28, 2014, Xu was relieved of his post by the Organization Department of the Chinese Communist Party.

== See also ==
- Liu Tienan, former Director of the National Energy Administration
- Wei Pengyuan, Xu's subordinate sentenced to death for bribery
