= Xinda =

Xinda may refer to:

- Xinjiang University (新大; xīndà), a public university in Ürümqi, Xinjiang, China
- China Cinda Asset Management (信达; xìndà), an asset management company in Xicheng, Beijing, China
