= Pan Qisheng =

Chinese politician

- 潘启胜

Communist Party Secretary of Xiaogan
- In office December 2017 – November 2019
- Preceded by: Teng Gang
- Succeeded by: Wu Haitao

Personal details
- Born: January 1965 (age 61) Ezhou, Hubei, China
- Party: Chinese Communist Party (1992–2021; expelled)
- Education: Central Party School of the Chinese Communist Party

Chinese name
- Simplified Chinese: 潘启胜
- Traditional Chinese: 潘啟勝
Transcriptions
Standard Mandarin
- Hanyu Pinyin: Pān Qǐshèng

Pan Qisheng (Chinese: 潘启胜; born January 1965) is a former Chinese politician who spent most of his career in his home-province Hubei. As of November 2019, he was under investigation by China's top anti-corruption agency. Previously he served as party secretary of Xiaogan.

== Biography ==
Pan was born in Ezhou, Hubei, in January 1965. He began his political career in July 1984, while he became an official in the Planning Commission of Huanggang Prefecture. He joined the Chinese Communist Party (CCP) in April 1992. In June 1998, he was appointed deputy director of Huanggang Sports Bureau. After this office was terminated in July 2005, he became director of Huanggang Environmental Protection Bureau, but having held the position for only five months, and was promoted to deputy director of Hubei Provincial Department of Commerce.

In February 2009, he was assigned to be party secretary of Nanzhang County, concurrently serving as chairman of Nanzhang County People's Congress. It would be his first job as "first-in-charge" of a county. He was also admitted to member of the standing committee of the CCP Xiangyang Municipal Committee, the city's top authority.

In November 2011, he became deputy party secretary of Xiaogan, rising to party secretary, the top political position in the city, in November 2017. He was chairman of Hubei Changjiang Publishing Group between August 2014 and May 2017. During his term in office, Pan Qisheng met Lai Xiaomin through a Hong Kong businessman. Subsequently, they established Beijing Tongjinsuo Asset Management Company (北京通金所资产管理公司), whose main business is P2P Internet finance.

=== Downfall ===
On 7 November 2019, he was put under investigation for alleged "serious violations of discipline and laws" by the Central Commission for Discipline Inspection (CCDI), the party's internal disciplinary body, and the National Supervisory Commission, the highest anti-corruption agency of China. After his sacking, his background of gang boss and the scandal of keeping more than 20 mistresses were also exposed by the Chinese media.

On 6 January 2021, he was expelled from the Communist Party and dismissed from public office.

== Personal life ==
Pan is married and has a son. He and his mistress, a host surnamed Ye in the Hubei TV station, have an illegitimate daughter.

Business positions
Preceded by Sun Yongping	Chairman of Hubei Changjiang Publishing Group; 2014–2017	Succeeded by Chen Yiguo
Government offices
Preceded by Wen Zhenfu	Director of State Owned Assets Supervision and Administration Commission of Hubei Provincial People's Government; 2017	Succeeded by Fu Limin
Party political offices
Preceded by Teng Gang	Communist Party Secretary of Xiaogan; 2017–2019	Succeeded by Wu Haitao
