= Gaotaizi =

Gaotaizi (高台子镇) may refer to the following locations in China:

- Gaotaizi, Heilongjiang, in Datong District, Daqing
- Gaotaizi, Benxi, in Mingshan District, Benxi, Liaoning
- Gaotaizi, Jinzhou, in Yi County, Liaoning
- Gaotaizi, Xinmin, Liaoning
- Gaotaizizhen Subdistrict, Datong District, Daqing, Heilongjiang
