= Liu Tienan =

Chinese politician sentenced to life in prison for bribery in 2014

- 刘铁男
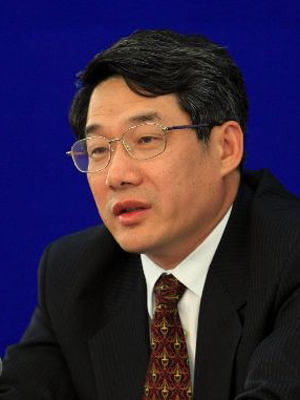
- Liu Tienan in June 2013

Director of the National Energy Administration
- In office December 2010 – March 2013
- Premier: Wen Jiabao
- Preceded by: Zhang Guobao
- Succeeded by: Wu Xinxiong

Vice-Chairman of National Development and Reform Commission
- In office March 2008 – May 2013
- Chairman: Zhang Ping; Xu Shaoshi

Personal details
- Born: October 1954 (age 71–72) Beijing, China
- Party: Chinese Communist Party (1976–2013; expelled)
- Spouse: Guo Jinghua
- Children: 1
- Education: Beijing University of Science and Technology; Northeastern University

Chinese name
- Traditional Chinese: 劉鐵男
- Simplified Chinese: 刘铁男
Transcriptions
Standard Mandarin
- Hanyu Pinyin: Liú Tiěnán
Yue: Cantonese
- Yale Romanization: Lau Tit-naam

Liu Tienan (Chinese: 刘铁男; born October 1954) is a former Chinese politician and senior economic official. He served as the director of the National Energy Administration between 2011 and 2013, the deputy director of the National Development and Reform Commission (NDRC) from 2008 to 2011, and deputy director of the Revitalizing Old Industrial Bases in Northeast China Special Working Group between 2006 and 2008.

In 2013, Liu was investigated and dismissed for corruption-related offenses. In December 2014, Liu was convicted on charges of bribery, and sentenced to life in prison. Several other politicians working with Liu at the NDRC, including Xu Yongsheng and Wei Pengyuan, were charged with corruption as well, with Wei being given the death penalty.

== Biography ==
=== Early life ===
Liu was born in Beijing in October 1954, with his ancestral home in Qi County, Shanxi. Liu graduated from Beijing University of Science and Technology and Northeastern University.

Liu joined the Chinese Communist Party in June 1976.

In 1983, he worked as an officer in State Planning Commission until 1996.

Liu worked at the Chinese foreign mission to Japan as an economic liaison officer between 1996 and 1999. While he worked at the embassy, Liu met a woman surnamed "Xu", who was studying for her doctorate degree at the time and also working as an interpreter. Liu reportedly began a romantic relationship with Xu soon after. Xu subsequently migrated to Canada. While in Japan Liu earned an honorary degree at Nagoya City University, reportedly with Xu's help.

=== Alleged business interests in Canada ===
The most serious allegation against Liu centers around his relationship with businessman Ni Ritao (倪日涛). In 2003, Liu met with Ni during the re-structuring of the latter's paper products company. Ni Ritao, a native of Wenzhou, was in the process of acquiring a large number of state-owned assets in the paper-making industry. As Liu's department had jurisdiction over the re-structuring process of Ni's company, the two developed a working relationship. Ni allegedly grew his businesses through building relationships with various state agency officials, including Liu. Many officials and their children reportedly became top shareholders or were listed as executives in Ni's business ventures.

Chinese media reported that Liu, along with the help of his wife Guo Jinghua (郭静华), his son Liu Decheng (刘德成), and his mistress Xu, worked together with Ni to set up several corporations in the Vancouver area in Canada. One of these companies, CGR Investments Inc., was set up in the province of British Columbia, with 90% of the initial equity owned by Ni, and 10% owned by Guo. In addition, Ni also set up another corporation called "Sun Wave Investments Ltd." (山威投资有限公司). Xu was listed as the chief executive for both companies. CGR was registered to a private residence in the Vancouver suburb of Burnaby; its listed headquarters was then moved to a commercial building in Richmond.

Once Liu Decheng reached the age of majority and began studying in Canada, he took over his mother's shares in CGR in December 2005. It was unclear what kind of business CGR operated in. In addition, Ni also set up a series of corporations under the "Sun Wave" umbrella, many of which were shell corporations which never had operational activities. It was alleged that Liu used his influence to secure a $100-million loan from The Export-Import Bank of China and the China Minsheng Bank in Ni's purchase of the New Skeena Pulp Mill located in the city of Prince Rupert, an asset that was already indirectly under the control of Ni through one of his corporate vehicles.

=== Career in NDRC ===
In 1999, Liu was appointed as the vice-chairman of State Development Planning Commission, an agency that oversaw regulations for some state-owned enterprises. The National Development and Reform Commission was founded in 2003 and took over some of the responsibilities of the Planning Commission, and Liu became a director of its Industry Department, as well as a senior official in the special working group on revitalizing the economy of Northeastern China. At year-end review meetings in 2005, Liu allegedly said that he would decline banquet invitations (frequently seen as venues to curry favours from officials) from anyone below the level of a provincial governor. Liu's superior Song Xiaowu said that Liu frequently conducted himself in a high-profile manner, often having police vehicles escort his entourage to ensure smooth flow of traffic on his trips to the provinces.

During the NDRC's performance evaluations of civil servants in 2006, Liu was put up for promotion, but was allegedly rebuffed by some of his colleagues for his apparently "arrogant" behavior. Nonetheless, he was still appointed to become the deputy director of the Northeast China working group at the end of 2006, which placed him at the same rank as a Deputy Minister. Liu was critical of the policies of his then-superior Zhang Guobao. In March 2008, Liu was appointed as the vice-chairman of National Development and Reform Commission.

In December 2010, Liu was appointed as the chairman of National Energy Administration, a body under the NDRC that oversees energy affairs in China. In September 2011, Liu gained a seat on the powerful National Energy Commission, a supra-ministerial energy coordination body that was chaired by the premier. In November 2011, Caijing Magazine reported that Liu's wife and son held shares in overseas companies, but did not directly mention Liu by name. Liu's alleged haughty behavior alienated many officials in the department. In May 2012, many senior retired officials signed a joint letter to the Central Commission for Discipline Inspection, China's top anti-corruption body, to report Liu's alleged corrupt behaviors.

=== Investigation and arrest ===
On December 6, 2012, the deputy chief editor of Caijing magazine, Luo Changping, reported Liu to the Central Commission for Discipline Inspection. Luo outlined three allegations against Liu Tienan. Luo promptly posted these allegations to his public Weibo account; namely, that Liu Tienan faked his academic credentials, that Liu received large kickbacks from businessman Ni Ritao in the overseas bank loan fraud scheme, and that Liu issued death threats to his mistress after the relationship between the two had gone sour. At the time the story broke, Liu was on a trip to Russia participating at a Sino-Russian energy conference with Vice-Premier Wang Qishan. Liu issued a vehement denial of the allegations, calling them "lies and slander", and vowed to take legal action. Despite Liu's denials of wrongdoing, party authorities had already begun investigating Liu behind closed doors as early as June 2012. As a result of these investigations, Liu's political fate was sealed. Liu was denied a seat on the Communist Party's Central Committee, as well as a seat on the Chinese People's Political Consultative Conference, a largely ceremonial legislative consultation body. Liu's son was detained by the authorities in January 2013. In the formation of the Li Keqiang government in March, Liu left office as the head of the NEA, and was succeeded by Wu Xinxiong.

At around 11 pm on Saturday, May 11, 2013, Liu and his wife Guo Jinghua were taken into custody from their Muxidi-area apartment in Beijing by the Central Commission for Discipline Inspection (CCDI). A day later, the CCDI publicly announced that Liu was under investigation for corruption, thus making him one of the first 'casualties' of the widespread campaign against corruption initiated under Xi Jinping, General Secretary of the Chinese Communist Party. On May 14, 2013, Liu was dismissed from his position as vice-chairman of the NDRC. On August 8, Liu was expelled from the Chinese Communist Party.

=== Trial and sentencing ===
Liu's trial began in September 2014 at the Langfang Intermediate People's Court in Langfang, Hebei, a municipality situated near Beijing. The trial, one of the highest profile since that of Chongqing party chief Bo Xilai, was a partially televised affair that drew national attention. The prosecution alleged that Liu received bribes and kickbacks for furthering the interests of numerous companies between 2002 and 2012. Liu was said to have accepted the equivalent of about 35.6 million yuan ($5.8 million) together with his son, Decheng, in return for favours to business people acquainted with him. The prosecution alleged that Liu received in bribes a Nissan Teana, renovations to his Muxidi apartment, as well as a suburban Beijing villa and a Porsche for his son.

On September 24, Liu issued a final statement to the court. In the statement, Liu said he intended to cooperate with the court and take "any punishment meted out by the law". He also said he had been taking sleeping pills, having been unable to rest due to the guilt over his having ruined his son's future. He issued apologies to his parents and his wife. He also said that he should be used as a "counter example" of what not to do as a high official. On December 10, Liu was convicted on bribery charges, and sentenced to life in prison. The state also confiscated all of his personal property.

== Personal life ==
Liu married Guo Jinghua (郭静华; 郭靜華), their son, Liu Decheng (刘德成; 劉德成), was born in 1985. At the age of 18, Liu Decheng began to study in Canada.

In 1996, Liu met his future mistress, a woman surnamed Xu, in Japan; Xu subsequently emigrated to Canada, but their romantic relationship continued. Sometime later, the two had a dispute and the relationship ended. Thereafter, Xu reportedly sent materials related to the overseas loan schemes to various media outlets.

Journalist Luo Changping asserted in Datieji, a chronicle about the investigation into Liu Tienan, that Liu was part of a "secret society" style political alliance known as the "Xishan Society". The group was said to have been gathering in the western hills of Beijing since 2007 and consisted of high officials with ties to Shanxi province.

== See also ==
- Xu Yongsheng
- Wei Pengyuan

Political offices
Preceded by Zhang Guobao	Director of the National Energy Administration; 2010–2013	Succeeded by Wu Xinxiong
