= State Electricity Regulatory Commission =

Chinese government agency

- 国家电力监管委员会 guójiā diànlì jiānguǎn wěiyuánhuì

Agency overview
- Formed: 2003
- Jurisdiction: China
- Headquarters: Beijing
- Agency executive: Wang Xudong, Chairman
- Website: www.serc.gov.cn/

State Electricity Regulatory Commission (SERC, Chinese: 国家电力监管委员会; pinyin: guójiā diànlì jiānguǎn wěiyuánhuì) was a government agency responsible for the administration and regulation of the electricity and power industry in the People's Republic of China. This includes regulating the development of electricity markets, advising the National Development Reform Commission on the setting tariffs, while NDRC actually sets the tariffs, transmission, distribution, safety standards, technical standards, business licenses, environmental laws and development of the industry. Its functions were later folded into the National Energy Administration.

== List of chairs ==
1. Chai Songyue (March 2003 - December 2006)
2. You Quan (December 2006 - April 2008)
3. Wang Xudong (April 2008 - June 2011)
4. Wu Xinxiong (June 2011 - March 2013)

== See also ==
- Electric power industry in China
- Chinese electric motor industry
- North China Electric Power University
- North China University of Water Conservancy and Electric Power
- State Grid Corporation of China
- China Power International Development
- China Power Investment Corporation
- China Yangtze Power
- China Resources Power
- China Southern Power Grid
- China Township Electrification Program
- China Village Electrification Program
- Energy in China
- Renewable energy in China
- Electric power in China
- Coal power in China
- Nuclear power in China
- Wind power in China
- Solar power in China
- Oil in China
- Geothermal power in China
- Bioenergy in China
