= Fullshare Holdings =

Multinational investment company

Fullshare Holdings Limited
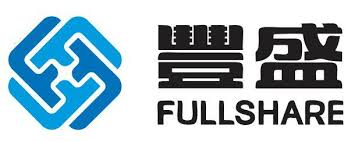
- Formerly: Warderly International Holdings Limited
- Traded as: SEHK: 607
- Industry: Conglomerate
Founded
2002; 23 years ago	(incorporation)
2013	(reverse IPO)
- Founder: Yeung Kui Wong (Warderly); Ji Changqun (Fullshare Group)
Headquarters
Nanjing, China	(de facto)
Grand Cayman, Cayman Islands	(registered office)
Hong Kong S.A.R., China	(second office)
- Services: Diversified Investment
Owner
Ji Changqun	(49.66%)
China Huarong	(9.59%)

Chinese name
- Simplified Chinese: 丰盛控股有限公司
- Traditional Chinese: 豐盛控股有限公司
Transcriptions

Chinese short name
- Simplified Chinese: 丰盛控股
- Traditional Chinese: 豐盛控股
Transcriptions

former Chinese name
- Traditional Chinese: 匯多利國際控股有限公司
Transcriptions

former Chinese short name
- Traditional Chinese: 匯多利
Transcriptions
- Website: www.fullshare.com

Fullshare Holdings Limited is a multinational conglomerate and investment company. The company was established in Nanjing, China in 2002 and was listed on the Hong Kong stock exchange in December 2013. It also has offices in Hong Kong, Singapore, and Australia. Fullshare is primarily invested in property development and investment, education, healthcare, tourism and renewable energy.

== History ==
Fullshare Group was founded in 2002 by Ji Changqun (Chinese: 季昌群), who is the chairman and CEO of Fullshare Holdings. It was ranked 108 of the top 500 private companies in China in 2010. In December 2013, Fullshare Holdings was listed on the Hong Kong Stock Exchange after completing the reverse takeover of Warderly International Holdings Limited (Chinese: 匯多利國際控股有限公司). Fullshare is primarily invested in the property development and investment, education and healthcare, tourism, and renewable energy.

Warderly itself was a listed company in Hong Kong stock exchange since 18 December 2002. It was a maker of white goods such as fans, heaters, etc. Although Warderly was incorporated in Grand Cayman, Cayman Islands on 18 March 2002 and registered in Hong Kong as a "registered foreign company" in the same year, the business of Warderly was commenced in China in 1989. The company was suspended by the Securities and Futures Commission in 2007. It was suspended until the December 2013 takeover.

== Businesses ==
Fullshare's business spans investments in property development and investment, education and healthcare, tourism, and renewable energy.

=== Property development and investment ===
Fullshare's investment properties include Wonder City (Chinese: 虹悦城), Yuhua Salon (Chinese: 雨花客厅), Yuecheng Kindergarten (Chinese: 同景跃城幼儿园), Nantong Youshan Meidi Garden Project (Chinese: 南通优山美地花园项目), Huitong Building Project (Chinese: 汇通大厦项目), and Zhenjiang Youshan Meidi Garden Project (Chinese: 镇江优山美地花园项目) covering approximately 246,588 sqm of gross floor area.

Fullshare operates and manages Wonder City, a 100,605 sqm large-scale shopping mall in Nanjing, China. Wonder City receives approximately 55,000 shoppers per day with its offering of international retail brands, including Zara, H&M, Uniqlo, and Apple, among others. Fullshare operates and manages GSH Plaza (formerly known as Equity Plaza), a prestigious 22,395 sqm Grade A office tower located in Raffles Place in the central business district of Singapore. GSH Plaza is a 28-storey office tower with 259 strata office units and 2 levels of retail space.

Fullshare operates and manages Yuhua Salon (Chinese: 雨花客厅), a 90,031 sqm office and shopping mall in Nanjing, China. Yuhua Salon was developed by Fullshare Group and is located in the center of China's software valley, Nanjing, which houses over 660 software companies employing more than 150,000 software employees.

Fullshare holds a controlling interest in BaoQiao Partners Capital (Chinese: 寶橋融資; pinyin: Bǎo qiáo róng zī; Jyutping: bou2 kiu4 jung4 zi1, formerly Bridge Partners Capital) and its sister companies such as Absolute Investment Management (Chinese: 寶橋投資管理), a Hong Kong-based financial advisory and asset management group licensed with the Securities and Futures Commission as a licensed intermediary in Type 1 (Dealing in Securities), 4 (Advising on Securities), 6 (Advising on Corporate Finance), and 9 (Asset Management).

=== Education and healthcare ===
Fullshare holds a controlling interest in Sparrow Early Learning, a leading early childhood education provider in Australia. In August 2017, Fullshare announced that Sparrow completed the acquisition of additional long day care kindergarten centres in Australia, brokered by All Childcare Sales. Fullshare has expanded Sparrow to 32 education centres, with a majority of education centres located evenly in Queensland and Victoria, Australia.

Fullshare Holdings Limited and Sparrow Early Learning have partnered with La Cantera Soccer School to provide soccer training classes and camps for children aged 3 to 12 under the school's new branding, Sparrow Soccer School. Sparrow Soccer School is the largest soccer school in Tung Chung with over 200 students.

Fullshare holds an interest Hing Sang Group which is listed on the Stock Exchange of Hong Kong (Ticker: 6893) and became Hin Sang Group's second largest shareholder. Hin Sang Group is engaged in the marketing, selling and manufacturing of healthcare products with a focus on healthcare products for children. Fullshare and Hin Sang Group have since established a joint-venture to develop children's hospitals and children's treatment centers in Hong Kong and China. Fullshare holds an interest in Mediskin which is listed on the Stock Exchange of Hong Kong (Ticker: 8307). Mediskin operates two medical skin care centres at prime locations in Hong Kong that primarily focus on the treatment of skin diseases and problems.

=== Tourism ===
Fullshare holds an interest in Tuniu Corporation. Tuniu Corporation is a leading Chinese online travel agency (www.Tuniu.com) and is listed on the NASDAQ (Ticker: TOUR). Fullshare announced it had entered a non-legally binding MOU to acquire an indirect equity interest in Shanghai Joyu, a Chinese online travel agency (www.Lvmama.com) in business-to-consumer as well as the sales of tickets to major tourist attractions in China.

Fullshare operates the Sheraton Mirage Port Douglas Resort in Port Douglas, Queensland, Australia. Sheraton Mirage Resort encompasses a 5-star, 295-room hotel with 4 food and beverage outlets and an 18-hole golf course. These amenities also form part of Mirage Country Club, Port Douglas which makes use of the 18-hole golf course, clubhouse, gym and swimming pool.

Fullshare manages the 51,096 sqm ORTO Park (formerly Bottle Tree Park) in the northern area of Singapore. ORTO Park is Singapore's first multi-recreational park that is open to the public 24 hours per day. ORTO Park overlooks the scenic lake with three event venues: Lakehouse, Stage, and Promenade.

=== Renewable Energy ===
In December 2016 Fullshare acquired a controlling interest in fellow listed company China High Speed Transmission Equipment Group, a supplier of mechanical transmission equipment in China, such as the parts for wind turbine.

== Partnership ==
=== Official Education Partner of Inter Milan ===
Fullshare was designated as the official education partner of Inter Milan Football Club in 2018. Fullshare introduces Inter Academy model to Australia which provides children with soccer coaching available during weekly classes, after school classes and holiday camps in Queensland, Australia.

=== Official Tournament Partner of the Hong Kong Sevens ===
Fullshare is designated as the official tournament partner for the Hong Kong Rugby Sevens.

== Criticism ==
On 25 April 2017, short-seller Glaucus Research Group alleged Fullshare as, "One of the largest stock manipulation schemes trading on any exchange anywhere in the world." This prompted Fullshare's share price to drop 11.9% before it entered a trading halt at HK$2.52 per share. On 2 May 2017, Fullshare made a clarification announcement in relation to Glaucus Research Group's accusation of Fullshare. On 4 May 2017, Fullshare resumed trading and its share price closed 17.5% higher at HK$2.96 per share.
