= China National Coal Group =

Chinese state-owned company

- logo and Chinese name
- Formerly: China National Coal Industry Import and Export Corp.; China National Coal Group Corp.
- Type: State-owned enterprise
- Industry: Coal mining
- Founded: 1982
- Headquarters: Beijing, China
- Area served: China
- Key people: Li Yanjiang (Chairman & Party Committee Secretary)
- Products: Coal
- Services: Coal production
- Revenue: ▼US$ 35.4 billion (2023)
- Net income: ▲US$ 2.15 billion (2023)
- Total assets: US$ 74.0 billion (2023)
- Owner: Chinese central government (100%)
- Number of employees: 144,531 (2023)
- Subsidiaries: China Coal Energy (58.36%); Shanxi Huayu Energy (60%); Heilongjiang Coal Chemical Group (100%)
- Website: www.chinacoal.com

China National Coal Group Co., Ltd.
- Simplified Chinese: 中国中煤能源集团有限公司
- Traditional Chinese: 中國中煤能源集團有限公司
- Literal meaning: China Coal Energy Group Limited Company
Transcriptions
Standard Mandarin
- Hanyu Pinyin: Zhōngguó Zhōng Méi Néngyuán Jítuán Yǒuxiàn Gōngsī

China Coal Group
- Simplified Chinese: 中煤集团
- Traditional Chinese: 中煤集團
Transcriptions
Standard Mandarin
- Hanyu Pinyin: Zhōng Méi Jítuán

China Coal
- Simplified Chinese: 中煤
- Traditional Chinese: 中煤
Transcriptions
Standard Mandarin
- Hanyu Pinyin: Zhōng Méi

China National Coal Group Co., Ltd., known as China Coal Group, is a Chinese coal mining conglomerate that was supervised by the State-owned Assets Supervision and Administration Commission (SASAC) of the State Council. It was the second largest state-owned coal mining enterprise in the mainland China, and the third largest in the world, just after Shenhua Group in 2008, according to a website quoting Xinhua News Agency. It is engaged in coal production and sales, coal chemicals, coal mining equipment manufacturing, coal mine design and related engineering services.

In 2009 the corporation was re-incorporated as a limited company. The group also acquired Shanxi Huayu Energy in the same year. China United Coalbed Methane, a joint venture of China Coal Group and PetroChina, became a wholly owned subsidiary of China Coal Group also in 2009. At the same time PetroChina acquired some assets from China United Coalbed Methane. China Coal Group later sold China United Coalbed Methane to China National Offshore Oil Corporation in tranches from 2010 to 2014.

China Coal Group's subsidiary, China Coal Energy, has been listed on the Hong Kong Stock Exchange since 2006 and the Shanghai Stock Exchange since 2008. China Coal Group retained the stake in "China Coal Heilongjiang Coal Chemical Engineering Group" (Heilongjiang Coal Chemical Group, Chinese: 中煤黑龙江煤炭化工(集团)有限公司) and an equity investment in Taiyuan Coal Gasification Group (太原煤炭气化(集团)有限责任公司, 47.67%), as they still provide coal gas to the citizen on non-for-profit basis. China Coal Group later acquired 3.9% stake of Taiyuan Coal Gasification Group from fellow central government owned China Cinda Asset Management, but in 2013 transferred 16.18% stake to SASAC of Shanxi Province without compensation. As of 31 December 2015, China Coal Group owned Taiyuan Coal Gasification Group 35.39% stake as the second largest shareholder.

In 2014, China Coal Group promised to inject "Heilongjiang Coal Chemical Group" and "Shanxi Huayu Energy" to the listed company in order to avoid competition. However, as at 2016 they were remained in the unlisted portion of the group, but the promise would remain valid until 2021. Nevertheless, Heilongjiang Coal Chemical Company, another company, was already under China Coal Energy.

In 2016, Shanxi Huayu Energy delayed a week to pay off principal and interest in full for a bond.

In 2024, China National Coal Group was responsible for 657 Mt of CO_{2} emissions, which was 1.7% of global CO_{2} emissions.

== See also ==
- Coal power in China
- Mining industry of China
