= Datong, Anhui =

Subdistrict of Huainan, China

Coordinates: 32.6333°N 117.0466°E

Datong is a subdistrict and seat of Datong District, Huainan, Anhui. As of 1997, Datong covers 11 square kilometers and has a population of 30,000. Datong is divided into Yuanwang Community, Zhanhou Community, Jubei Community, Junan Community, and Kuangnan Community.
