= China CITIC Financial Asset Management =

State-owned asset management company

China CITIC Financial Asset Management Co., Ltd.

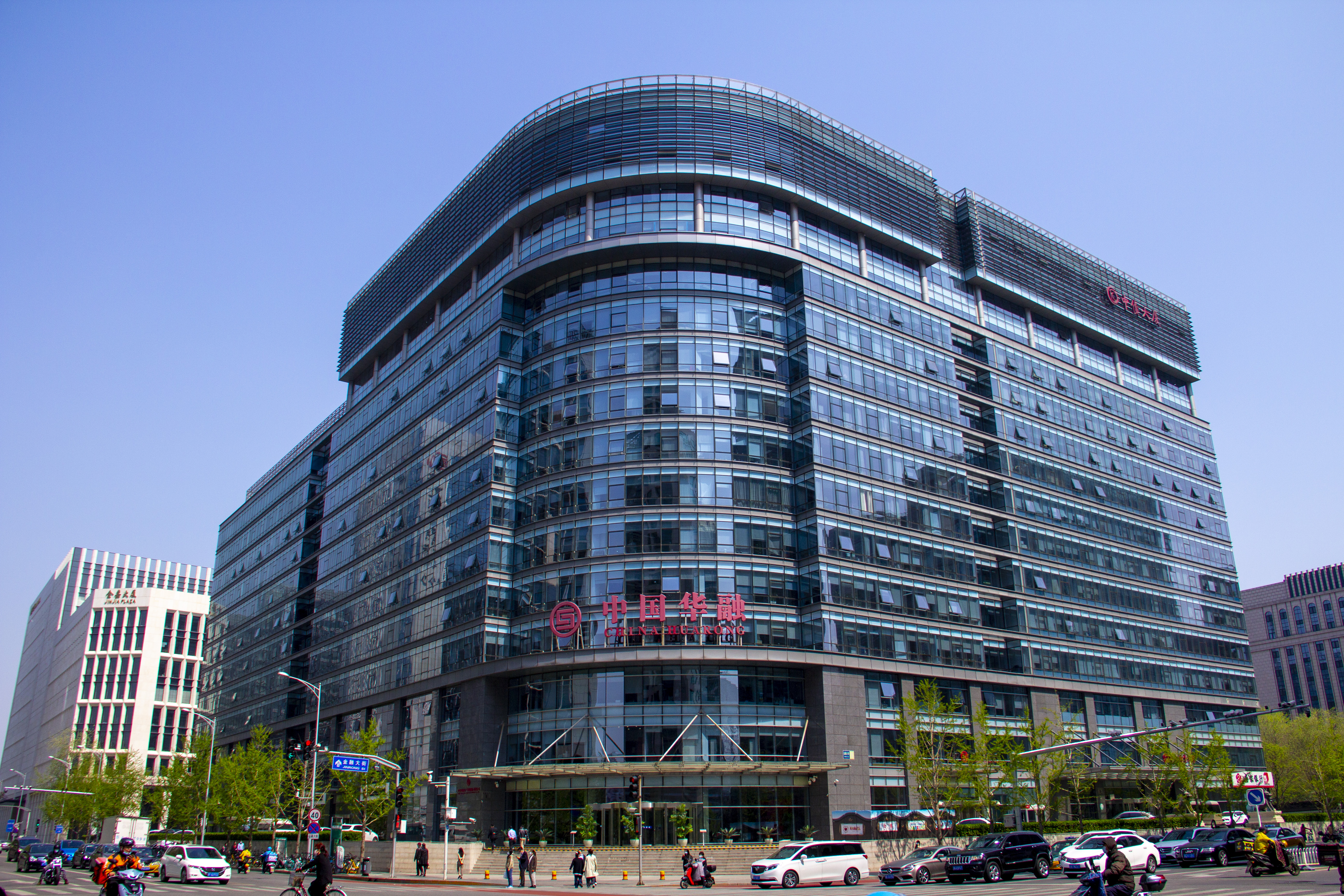
- Headquarters in Beijing
- Native name: 中国中信金融资产管理股份有限公司
- Formerly: China Huarong Asset Management Co., Ltd.
- Company type: Public
- Traded as: SEHK: 2799
- ISIN: CNE100002367
- Industry: Financial services
- Founded: 11 November 1999; 26 years ago
- Headquarters: Beijing, China
- Area served: China (Mainland and Hong Kong)
- Key people: Liu Zhengjun (Chairman); Li Zimin (President)
- Revenue: ▲CN¥75.8 billion (2023)
- Net income: ▲CN¥212.07 million (2023)
- Total assets: ▲CN¥968.10 billion (2023)
- Total equity: ▲CN¥48.04 billion (2023)
- Owner: CITIC Group (26.46%); Ministry of Finance (24.76%)
- Number of employees: 5,800 (2023)
- Parent: CITIC Group
- Website: www.chamc.com.cn
- Footnotes / references in a consolidated basis

China Huarong Asset Management Co., Ltd.
- Simplified Chinese: 中国华融资产管理股份有限公司
- Traditional Chinese: 中國華融資產管理股份有限公司
Transcriptions
Standard Mandarin
- Hanyu Pinyin: Zhōngguó huá róng zīchǎn guǎnlǐ gǔfèn yǒuxiàn gōngsī

China CITIC Financial Asset Management (previously known as China Huarong) is a majority state-owned financial asset management company in China, with a focus on distressed debt management. It was one of the four asset management companies that the Government of China established in 1999 in response to the 1997 Asian financial crisis.

== History ==
On 11 November 1999, China Huarong was incorporated in Beijing as China Huarong Asset Management Corporation (Chinese: 中国华融资产管理公司), which was one of the four asset management companies as approved by the State Council of the People's Republic of China. In 2000, China Huarong began acquiring a non-performing loan of RMB 407,696 million from the Industrial and Commercial Bank of China. The company later became a limited company: China Huarong Asset Management Co., Ltd. (Chinese: 中国华融资产管理股份有限公司) in 2012.

In August 2014, China Huarong introduced seven strategic investors, including Warburg Pincus, CITIC Securities International, Khazanah Nasional, China International Capital Corporation, COFCO Group, Fosun International, and Goldman Sachs while the Ministry of Finance of the People's Republic of China remained the majority controlling shareholder and China Life Insurance Group increased its shareholding.

In October 2015, China Huarong raised HK$17.8 billion through an initial public offering (IPO), offering 5.77 billion new shares in Hong Kong.

=== Trial and execution of Lai Xiaomin ===
In April 2018, the Central Commission for Discipline Inspection, and the National Supervisory Commission launched an investigation into possible "serious violations of discipline and laws" of Lai Xiaomin, the Chairman of China Huarong Asset Management, and the Chinese Communist Party Committee Secretary for Huarong. As Huarong's Party Secretary, he emphasized in 2015 that during the operation of China Huarong Asset Management, the Chinese Communist Party (CCP) committee inside the company should play a central role, and party members should play an exemplary role. On 15 October 2018, Lai Xiaomin was expelled from the CCP. On 11 August 2020, the No. 2 Intermediate People's Court of Tianjin opened a public hearing on the case of bribery, corruption, and bigamy of Lai Xiaomin. The indictment alleges that Lai Xiaomin accepted 1.788 billion yuan in bribes, and illegally occupied public funds 25.13 million Yuan. On 5 January 2021, Lai was found guilty of receiving 1.79 billion yuan ($277.3 million) in bribes and bigamy and was sentenced to death without reprieve for bribery, embezzlement, and bigamy. His private assets were seized as well. The sentence was carried out on 29 January 2021. In 2025, general manager Bai Tianhui was also sentenced to death and executed for taking bribes during the same period as Lai.

=== 2021 Bond selloff and default fears ===
In April 2021, offshore U.S. dollar bonds issued by China Huarong plunged in value. The selloff came after the company missed an end-March deadline to release its 2020 financial results. Fears of a near-term default were eased after the company was said to have prepared funds for full repayment of S$600 million ($450 million) offshore bonds due 27 April. To reduce the risk of market contagion and to stabilize its cash flow, Chinese regulators asked Chinese banks to provide loans to China Huarong.

In August 2021, CITIC Group became China Huarong's largest shareholder with a nearly 26.5 percent stake after a group of state-owned investors bought into the company.

=== 2022 to present ===
In January 2024, the company was renamed to China CITIC Financial Asset Management.

== Subsidiaries ==
- Huarong International Financial (SEHK: 993)

== Equity investments ==
- Baiyin Nonferrous (0.30%)
- Fenxi Mining Industry Group
- Taiyuan Coal Gasification Group (2.46%)
- Xinjiang Ba Yi Iron and Steel Group (7.95%)
- Fullshare Holdings (9.88% indirectly)
- Uxin (5.48%)

Former

- Wanhua Industrial Group (15.04%)
