= Jinneng Holding Group =

Chinese state-owned energy company

Jincheng Anthracite Mining Group
- Company type: State-owned enterprise
- Industry: Energy
- Founded: 2020
- Headquarters: Jincheng, China
- Area served: China
- Products: Anthracite, coal, electricity, chemicals
- Revenue: US$ 63.640 billion (2023)
- Operating income: US$ 12.127 billion (2023)
- Net income: US$ 994 million (2023)
- Total assets: US$ 159.091 billion (2023)
- Total equity: US$ 10.658 billion (2023)
- Number of employees: 439,051 (2023)
- Parent: SASAC of Shanxi Government

Jinneng Holding Group is a Chinese state-owned energy company based in Jinzhong, Shanxi. The Group controls total assets of $US 151.8 billion, including a coal production capacity of approximately 468 million tons and an installed power generation capacity of 23.28 GW. With 439,051 employees, the company is one of the largest employers in the world.

== History ==
Jinneng Holding Group was formed in 2020 through the merging of the Datong Coal Mine Group, the Shanxi Jincheng Anthracite Coal Mining Group, the old Jinneng Group, the coal and electricity business and coal equipment manufacturing-related assets of Lu'an Group and Huayang New Materials Technology Group, and the restructured China Taiyuan Coal Trading Center Company.

== Structure ==
Jinneng Holding Group has established six subsidiaries:

- Jinneng Holding Coal Industry Group
- Jinneng Holding Power Group
- Jinneng Holding Equipment Manufacturing Group
- China Taiyuan Coal Trading Center
- Jinneng Holding Shanxi Science and Technology Research Institute Ltd.
- Jinneng Holding Finance Company
