= Nanyang Commercial Bank =

Bank in Hong Kong

- 南洋商業銀行
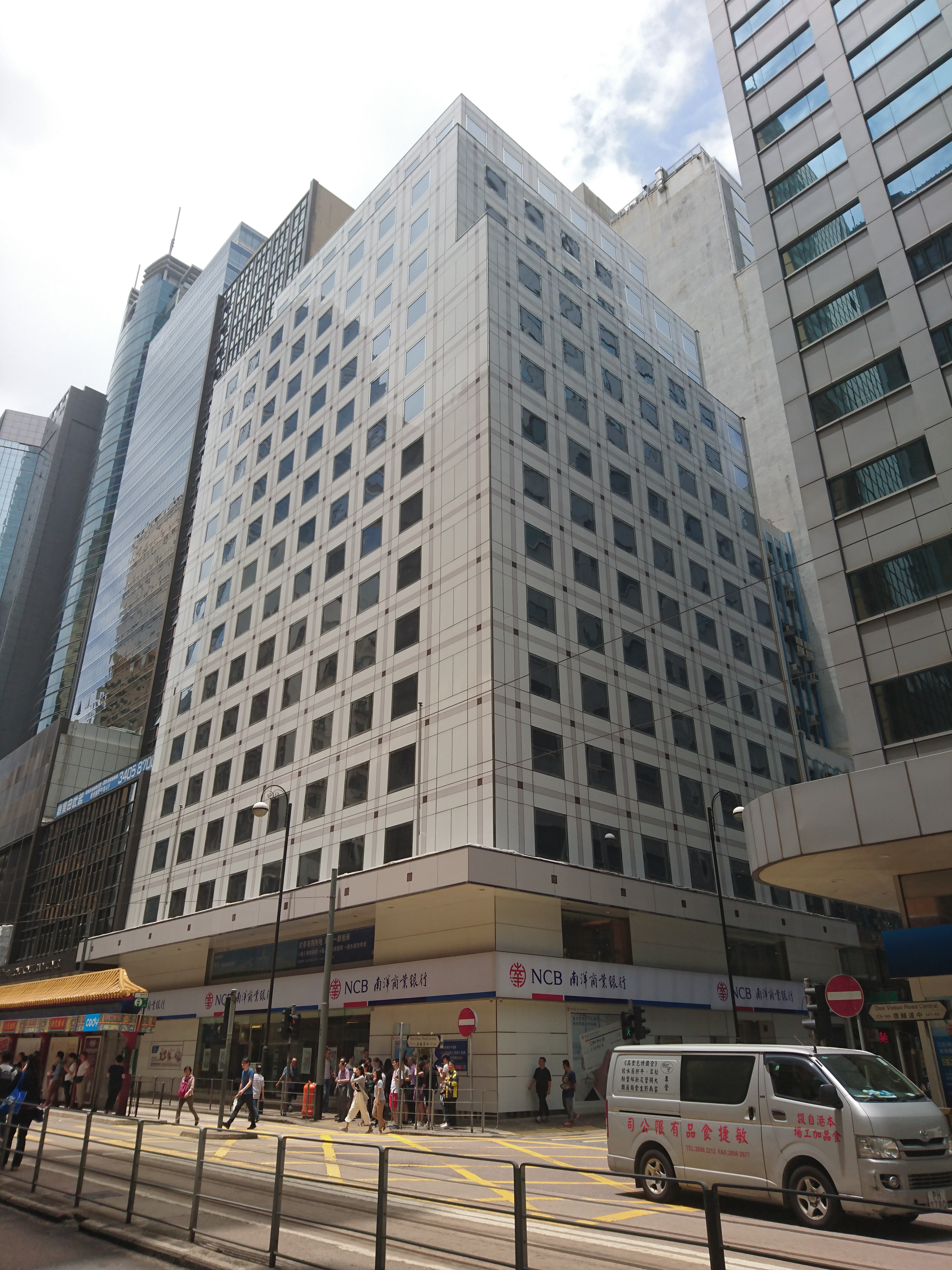
- Nanyang Commercial Bank Building
- Formation: 14 December 1949; 76 years ago
- Location: Hong Kong
- Website: ncb.com.hk

Nanyang Commercial Bank
- Traditional Chinese: 南洋商業銀行
- Simplified Chinese: 南洋商业银行
Transcriptions
Standard Mandarin
- Hanyu Pinyin: Nanyang Sheungye yínháng
Yue: Cantonese
- Yale Romanization: Nàahm yèuhng sēung yihp ngàhn hòhng
- Jyutping: Naam4 joeng4 soeng1 jip6 ngan4 hong4

Nanyang Commercial Bank (NCB, Chinese: 南洋商業銀行) is a bank based in Hong Kong and a wholly owned subsidiary of China Cinda Asset Management (Cinda), with 33 branches, 3 Commercial Business Centres and 4 Cross-border Wealth Management Centres. It was established in Hong Kong on 14 December 1949. NCB primarily focuses on corporate customers, in particular trading companies.

In 2015, Cinda acquired Nanyang Commercial Bank from Bank of China (Hong Kong) for HK$68 billion. Cinda had purchased NCB to diversify its business in areas of cross-border finance.

== Strategic Development ==
It was reported in December 2018 that Nanyang Commercial Bank was one of the shareholders of a financial technology firm, Nova Credit, which had entered bid to a new Know Your Client utility platform to be implemented for banks in Hong Kong and greater bay China region.
