= 2009 Shanxi mine blast =

Mining incident in Shanxi, China

The blast occurred pre-dawn in a mine in Gujiao city near Taiyuan, the capital of Shanxi province of China.

An explosion occurred in a mine in Gujiao city near Taiyuan, the capital of Shanxi province of China on 21 February 2009. 436 people were in the mine at the time of the explosion. According to the state-run Xinhua News Agency, rescue efforts concluded at 6 p.m. (CST), February 22 with all trapped miners located; the death toll was 74, with 114 in the hospital and five in critical condition. Many of the injured are being treated for carbon monoxide poisoning. The death toll indicates that this is the most lethal accident reported in China's mining industry since December 2007, when 105 people died in a mine explosion—that accident also took place in Shanxi.

== Accident details ==
The pre-dawn explosion occurred at 2:17 a.m. (CST) as 436 workers were in the Tunlan Coal Mine in Gujiao city. Xinhua News Agency reported that over four hundred men were working when the explosion occurred but that most escaped unhindered and unhurt. One hundred rescuers worked at the scene in Gujiao city as dozens of miners remained trapped. China Central TV (CCTV) broadcast footage of rescuers in orange suits and red helmets with headlamps entering an elevator where they were lowered into the mine shaft as injured miners were taken into ambulances. A fire in the shaft was said to be blocking the progress of the rescuers. There were also reports of trapped miners using mobile phones to call relatives to discuss their plight. A two-minute silence is planned in recognition of the dead on 25 February.

== Shanxi Coking ==
The involved mine is owned by Xishan Coal Electricity Group of Shanxi Coking Coal Group, one of China's largest producers of coking coal, a material used in the production of steel. The company operates twenty-eight mines. No accidents were reported at the Tunlan mine in the previous decade before this incident, and it consequently was considered a safe mine at which to work. The mine produces five million tons of coking coal per year.

== Mining in China ==
China has the world's deadliest mining industry, with the deaths of 3,200 people reported in 2008. This represents a 15% decline from the previous year. Government figures show that nearly 80% of China's 16,000 mines are small-scale, illegal operations.

== See also ==
- 2005 Sunjiawan mine disaster
- 2007 Shandong coal mine flood
- Benxihu Colliery
- Nanshan Colliery disaster
