= Wu Xinxiong =

Chinese politician (born 1949)

Wu Xinxiong 吴新雄
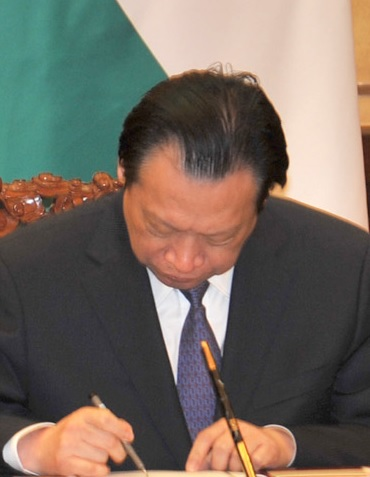

Director of the National Energy Administration
- In office 18 March 2013 – 31 December 2014
- Preceded by: Liu Tienan
- Succeeded by: Nur Bekri

Chairman of the State Electricity Regulatory Commission
- In office 2 June 2011 – 18 March 2013
- Preceded by: Wang Xudong
- Succeeded by: Office abolished

Governor of Jiangxi
- In office 31 October 2006 – 8 June 2011
- Preceded by: Huang Zhiquan
- Succeeded by: Lu Xinshe

Personal details
- Born: October 1949 (age 76–77) Jiangyin, Jiangsu, China
- Party: Chinese Communist Party
- Education: Nanjing University of Technology

Wu Xinxiong (Chinese: 吴新雄; pinyin: Wú Xīnxióng; born 1949) is a Chinese politician. From 2013 to 2014, Wu was the Director of the National Energy Administration, China's national energy regulatory agency.

He served as the Governor of Jiangxi from January 2007 to June 2011.

== Biography ==
Wu was born in 1949 in eastern Jiangsu Province. His first job was at a textiles factory in his hometown. He then became a high school teacher. He later successively served in government posts in his native Jiangyin, then the Mayor of Wuxi, then he was transferred to Jiangxi province to serve as the Party Secretary of Nanchang. He was first appointed the Governor of Jiangxi by the Jiangxi Provincial People's Congress in January 2007. He was subsequently re-elected by the legislature on January 28, 2008.

The Governor of Jiangxi is the second highest-ranking official in Jiangxi after the Party Secretary of the Jiangxi. The Governor is responsible for all matters related to personnel, the environment, economics, politics and foreign policy relating to Jiangxi.

Wu took over from Liu Tienan in March 2013 as director of the National Energy Administration. Liu was disgraced from a corruption scandal. Wu reached retirement age in 2014 and left office as head of the NEA in December.

Government offices
Preceded by Liu Tienan	Director of the National Energy Administration; 2013–2014	Succeeded by Nur Bekri
Preceded by Huang Zhiquan	Governor of Jiangxi; 2007–2011	Succeeded by Lu Xinshe
