= Bai Tianhui =

Chinese politician (1978–2025)

Bai Tianhui (Chinese: 白天辉; October 1978 – 9 December 2025) was a Chinese politician. He was executed in 2025 for taking bribes.

== Career ==
From 2014 to 2018, he served as the general manager of Huarong (Hong Kong) International Holdings Co., Ltd., and China Huarong International Holdings Co., Ltd. He successively served as capital operation director, assistant to the general manager, director, deputy general manager and general manager. He was a subordinate of Lai Xiaomin, the former chairman of Huarong Group.

After Lai Xiaomin was dismissed, Bai was also investigated. In January 2019, the case of Bai Tianhui suspected bribery was investigated by the Tianjin Municipal Supervision Commission and transferred to the procuratorate for review and prosecution. After the Supreme People's Procuratorate designated jurisdiction and reviewed and prosecuted by the Second Branch of the Tianjin Municipal People's Procuratorate, the latter made an arrest decision against Bai, and three other former executives of Huarong, Wang Pinghua, Guo Jintong, and Zhao Zichun, were arrested at the same time. In the second episode of the anti-corruption feature film "National Supervision" broadcast on 13 January 2020, Bai Hui appeared on the screen to tell the details of Lai Xiaomin's case.

== Execution ==
On 28 May 2024, he was sentenced to death by the Tianjin No. 2 Intermediate People's Court in the first instance for accepting bribes. With the approval of the Supreme People's Court, he was executed on 9 December 2025, at the age of 47.
