= Ma Chaoqun =

Chinese politician

- 马超群
- Born: 28 August 1967 (age 58); Haigang District, Qinghuangdao, Hebei, China
- Occupation: Politician
- Political party: Chinese Communist Party (expelled)
- Spouse: Zhang Lihuan
- Children: 1

Chinese name
- Simplified Chinese: 马超群
- Traditional Chinese: 馬超群
Transcriptions
Standard Mandarin
- Hanyu Pinyin: Mǎ Chāoqún

Ma Chaoqun (Chinese: 马超群; born 28 August 1967) is a Chinese politician and former municipal water works executive from the city of Qinhuangdao, in northeastern China. He underwent investigation for corruption beginning in 2014. He gained nationwide notoriety after investigators found over 120 million yuan (~$17 million) worth of cash in his home. Ma stored over 100 million yuan in an apartment that he purchased, similar to a method used by another corrupt official Wei Pengyuan, who was given the death penalty for bribery.

== Career ==
Ma was born in Haigang District in Qinghuangdao, the eldest of four children. In 1985, Ma graduated from a local polytechnic college and entered the municipal water works department, where he worked as a technician in charge of furnace maintenance. He later began taking on administrative roles. In 1997, Ma was named head of the water works division of Beidaihe, a seaside resort popular with leaders of the Communist Party. In 2005, the municipal water works was re-organized into a corporation, which signed a 25-year contract with the city to maintain the water supply. Ma became its vice president in charge of its Beidaihe branch.

In November 2010, the operations of the Beidaihe branch of the company was separated from that of Qinhuangdao. In the next year, the state-owned Beidaihe Water Works Corporation was founded with Ma Chaoqun as its chief executive. The company served Beidaihe as well as neighbouring counties. More importantly, the company was charged with providing water to various state and party agencies stationed in the area, including to Communist leaders during their annual summer retreat in Beidaihe. In 2012, Ma was given recognition by the province for his high performance during the summer months, named a "Model Labourer" by the city of Qinhuangdao.

In January 2014, Ma was reported by people with links to a state-owned company in Beijing as having solicited bribes worth millions of yuan from a local hotel. On February 12, 2014, Ma was detained for a corruption investigation. His younger brother Ma Zhongqun was detained on the same day, and his younger sister Ma Qingru was arrested a month later. On November 12, 2014, the Hebei provincial Commission for Discipline Inspection (CDI) released findings of its investigation, accusing Ma of embezzlement, bribery, and illegally moving public resources. He was arrested and faced a raft of criminal charges.

The Ma case gained notoriety for the astronomical value of alleged bribes. The Hebei CDI was said to have discovered over 120 million yuan ($19.3 million) worth of cash in Ma's home. Also unearthed was 37 kilograms of gold and 68 real estate certificates of ownership. To carry out Ma's arrest, the police mobilized the city's special operations unit, as Ma was believed to have ties with local organized crime. That Ma, merely a division-level (处级) official (i.e., rank equivalent to that of a county governor) had such a large sum stored up in his home shocked the public. Ma's mother Zhang Guiying denied that her son was corrupt, claiming that the assets were the result of years of hard work by her husband who operated a coal mine, asserting that her son was being blackmailed.

Chinese media has also reported connections between Ma Chaoqun and his so-called "godfather", who was suspected to be a high-level official from Beijing. It has been suggested that the processing of the case has faced interference from the authorities as increasing its scope may have dragged out an 'untouchable tiger'.

Ma is married to Zhang Lihuan (张丽焕) . They had one son named Ma Weihe (马唯贺) . Ma's name, "Chaoqun", means "soars above the rest."
