= China United Coalbed Methane =

- China United Coalbed Methane logo
- Type: subsidiary
- Industry: Oil and gas
- Founded: 1996; 2009 (partial demerger)
- Founder: China National Petroleum Corp.; Ministry of Coal Industry; Ministry of Geology & Mineral Resources
- Successor: PetroChina Coalbed Methane (partial)
- Headquarters: Beijing, China
- Area served: China
- Products: coal mine methane
- Owner: Chinese central government (100%)
- Parent: China National Offshore Oil Corporation
- Website: chinacbm.com

China United Coalbed Methane Corp., Ltd.
- Simplified Chinese: 中联煤层气有限责任公司
- Traditional Chinese: 中聯煤層氣有限責任公司
Transcriptions
Standard Mandarin
- Hanyu Pinyin: Zhōng lián méicéngqì yǒuxiàn zérèn gōngsī

China United Coalbed Methane
- Simplified Chinese: 中联煤层气
- Traditional Chinese: 中聯煤層氣
Transcriptions
Standard Mandarin
- Hanyu Pinyin: Zhōng Lián Méicéngqì

Second alternative Chinese name
- Simplified Chinese: 中联煤
- Traditional Chinese: 中聯煤
- Literal meaning: China United Coal
Transcriptions
Standard Mandarin
- Hanyu Pinyin: Zhōng Lián Méi

Third alternative Chinese name
- Simplified Chinese: 中联公司
- Traditional Chinese: 中聯公司
- Literal meaning: China United Corporation
Transcriptions
Standard Mandarin
- Hanyu Pinyin: Zhōng Lián Gōngsī

China United Coalbed Methane Corp., Ltd. (CUCBM), also known as China CBM, is state-owned company in China, which had exclusive rights until 2010 to explore, develop and produce coal mine methane in cooperation with overseas companies. The company was established in 1996.

== History ==
China United Coalbed Methane Corp., Ltd. was founded by two ministries and one state-owned enterprise of the State Council of the People's Republic of China in 1996 (China National Petroleum Corp., Ministry of Coal Industry and Ministry of Geology & Mineral Resources). At first it had a share capital of CN¥100 million. Under the Regulation on Sino-foreign Cooperation in the Development of Continental Petroleum Resources, which was revised on 2001, the corporation was the monopoly to sign deal with foreign industry to explore and produce coalbed methane. Although in 2007 another revise of the regulation giving the state council nominate other company in case-by-case basis. The State Council formally authorized 3 more companies in 2010, namely China National Petroleum Corporation (which already acquired the rights by 2009 partial demerger of China CBM), China Petrochemical Corporation and Henan Coalbed Methane Development and Utilization Co., Ltd.

== Shareholders ==
As of 31 December 2014 China National Offshore Oil Corporation (CNOOC) owned 100% stake. CNOOC acquired 30% stake in 2014, 20% stake in 2013 and 50% stake in 2010 from fellow state-owned enterprise China National Coal Group.

China National Coal Group was the sole shareholder from 2009 to 2010, which acquired 50% stake from PetroChina. (in turn PetroChina acquired some assets from China United Coalbed Methane and incorporated "PetroChina Coalbed Methane")

PetroChina and China National Coal Group acquired the stake in 1999 from its parent China National Petroleum Corporation and the Ministry of Land and Resources of the People's Republic of China respectively.

== See also ==
- Coal power in China
