= Xishan Coal and Electricity Power =

Chinese coal company

Xishan Coal and Electricity Power 西山煤电（集团）有限责任公司
- Company type: public
- Traded as: SZSE: 000983
- Industry: Coal mining
- Founded: 1999
- Founder: Xishan Coal Electricity Group
- Headquarters: Taiyuan, Shanxi, China
- Area served: China
- Key people: Chairman: Mr. Che Changchun
- Products: Coking Coal and others
- Owner: Shanxi Coking Coal Group
- Website: xsmd.com.cn

Shanxi Xishan Coal and Electricity Power
- Simplified Chinese: 山西西山煤电股份有限公司
Transcriptions

Xishan Coal and Electricity Power
- Simplified Chinese: 西山煤電
Transcriptions

Shanxi Xishan Coal and Electricity Power Co., Ltd. was established in 1999 and listed on the Shenzhen Stock Exchange in 2000. It has 9 coal mines, 8 coal plants and 13 holding companies.

Xishan Coal Electricity Group was the parent company of Xishan Coal and Electricity Power. However, they were now both subsidiary (in the same tier) of Shanxi Coking Coal Group.

Xishan Coal and Electricity Power became a constituent of SZSE 100 Index in January 2017.
