= China High Speed Transmission =

Chinese wind turbine manufacturer

China High Speed Transmission Equipment Group Co., Ltd. 中國高速傳動設備集團有限公司
- Industry: Gear and wind power transmission equipment manufacturing
- Founded: 1969
- Headquarters: Nanjing, Jiangsu, China
- Area served: People's Republic of China
- Key people: Chairman: Wu Yueming
- Website: www.chste.com

China High Speed Transmission Equipment Group Company, Ltd. (SEHK: 658) or China High Speed Transmission, China High Speed, is a high-speed gear transmission equipment manufacturer in China. It is the largest wind power transmission gear manufacturer in China.

China High Speed Transmission was founded in 1969, formerly Nanjing Machine Tool Repairing Plant. In 1976, the plant was expanded and transformed to a gear manufacturer and changed its name to Nanjing Gear Box Factory. In 2001, the name was changed into an incorporated company.

It was listed on the Hong Kong Stock Exchange in July 2007 with its IPO price of HK$7.08 per share. It closed the day at HK$14.00, nearly twice its IPO.
