= Zhang Guobao =

Chinese politician (1944–2019)

Zhang Guobao (simplified Chinese: 张国宝; traditional Chinese: 張國寶; November 1944 – 4 October 2019) was a Chinese government official who served as Vice Chairman of the National Development and Reform Commission.

== Biography ==
Zhang was born in Shaoxing, Zhejiang, in November 1944. He graduated from Xi'an Jiaotong University with a mechanical engineering degree and became a senior engineer. He joined the Chinese Communist Party in 1966 and rose to become the director of the Office for Northeast Economic Revitalization in 2004, and in 2007, the Director of the National Energy Administration and Vice Chairman of the National Development and Reform Commission. He left active politics in January 2011. He held a seat on the Standing Committee of the Chinese People's Political Consultative Conference until retiring in 2013.

Zhang died on 4 October 2019, aged 74.
