= Datong Coal Industry =

Chinese coal company

- Company type: public
- Traded as: SSE: 601001
- Industry: Coal mining
- Founded: 2001
- Headquarters: Datong, China
- Area served: China
- Key people: Chairman: Mr. Wu Yongping; General Manager: Li Zemin
- Products: Coal
- Services: Coal production
- Parent: Datong Coal Mining Group
- Website: Datong Coal Industry Company Limited

Datong Coal Industry Co., Ltd.
- Simplified Chinese: 大同煤业股份有限公司
- Literal meaning: Datong Coal Industry Joint-Stock Limited Company
Transcriptions
Standard Mandarin
- Hanyu Pinyin: Dàtóng méi yè gǔfèn yǒuxiàn gōngsī

Datong Coal Industry
- Simplified Chinese: 大同煤业
Transcriptions
Standard Mandarin
- Hanyu Pinyin: Dàtóng méi yè

Datong Coal Industry Co,. Ltd., established in 2001 and parented by Datong Coal Mining Group. It is engaged in excavating, processing and sales of coal. Its headquarters is in Datong City, the second largest city in Shanxi Province which has the greatest coal deposits in China.

It was listed on the Shanghai Stock Exchange in 2006.

== See also ==
- Coal power in China
