= Datong, Huainan =

Datong 大通区
- District
- Interactive map of Datong
- Coordinates: 32°36′51″N 117°03′37″E
- Country: China
- Province: Anhui
- Prefecture-level city: Huainan
- District seat: Datong Subdistrict

Area
  - Total: 350 km^{2} (140 sq mi)

Population (2020)
  - Total: 165,671
  - Density: 470/km^{2} (1,200/sq mi)
- Time zone: UTC+8 (China Standard)
- Postal code: 232008 - 232009

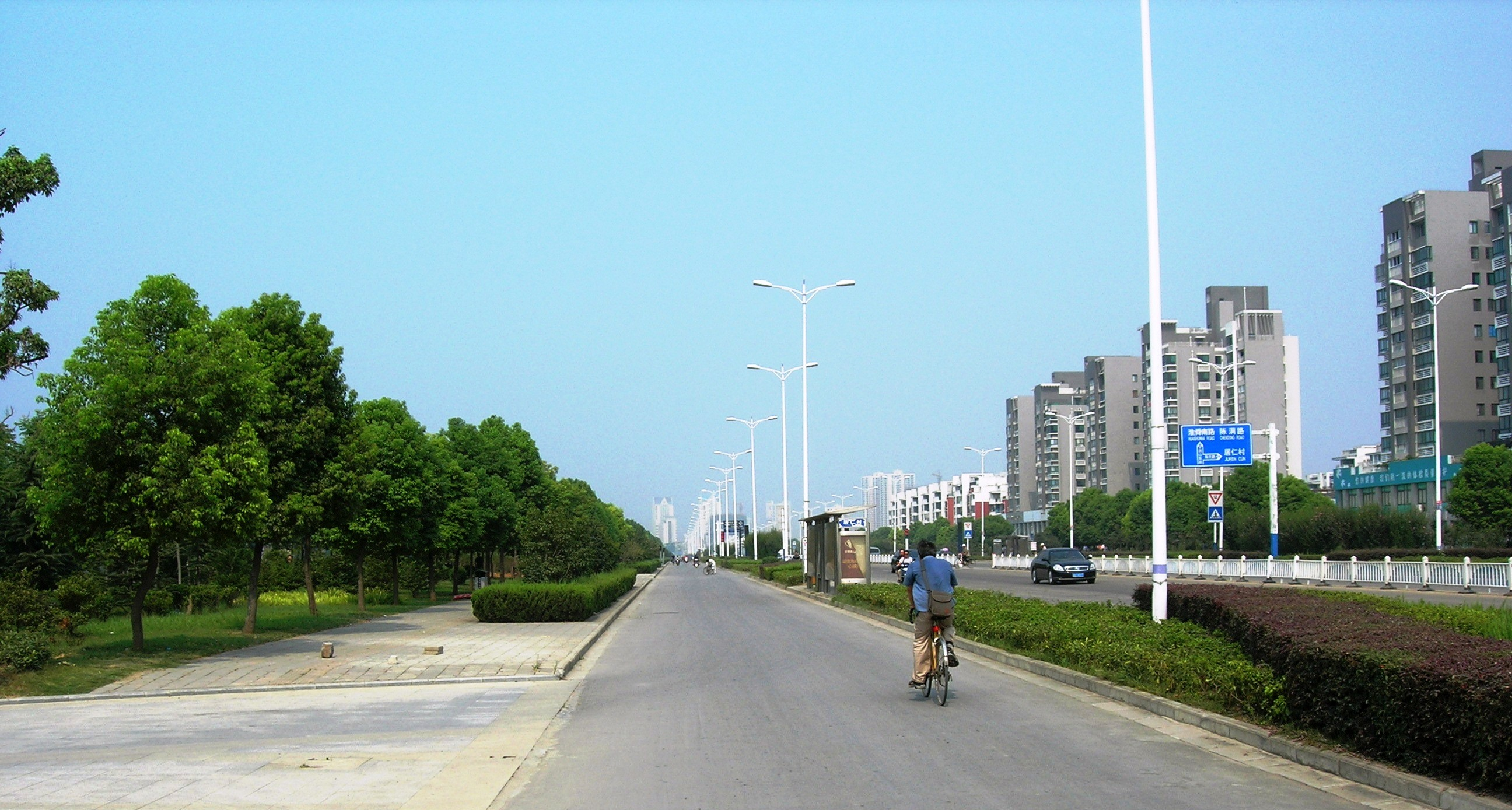
Juren Village Residential Complex, Datong

Datong (Chinese: 大通区; pinyin: Dàtōng Qū) is a district of the city of Huainan, Anhui Province, China.

== Administrative divisions ==
In the present, Datong District has 1 subdistrict, 3 towns and 1 township.

1 Subdistrict

- Datong (大通街道)

3 Towns

- Shangyao (上窑镇)
- Luohe (洛河镇)
- Jiulonggang (九龙岗镇)

1 Township

- Kongdian (孔店乡)
