= China Cinda Asset Management =

State-owned bank

China Cinda
- Native name: 中国信达资产管理股份有限公司
- Formerly: China Cinda Asset Management Corporation
- Company type: State-owned enterprise
- Traded as: SEHK: 1359 (H ordinary); SEHK: 4607 (H preference)
- Industry: Financial services
- Founded: 1999; 27 years ago
- Headquarters: No. 1 Building, 9 Naoshikou Street, Xicheng District, Beijing, China
- Area served: China
- Key people: Hou Jianhang (Chairman of the Board of Directors); Gong Jiande (Chairman of the Supervisory Board); Zang Jingfan (CEO)
- Services: merchant bank; asset management
- Revenue: ▲CN¥78.7 billion (2015)
- Operating income: ▲CN¥19.3 billion (2015)
- Net income: ▲CN¥14.0 billion (2015)
- Total assets: ▲CN¥714.0 billion (2015)
- Total equity: ▲CN¥101.7 billion (2015)
- Owner: Ministry of Finance of China (67.84%); National Social Security Fund (8.04%); Publicly listed (24.12%)
- Parent: Ministry of Finance of China
- Subsidiaries: Cinda Securities
- Website: www.cinda.com.cn
- Footnotes / references in a consolidated basis

China Cinda Asset Management Co., Ltd.
- Simplified Chinese: 中国信达资产管理股份有限公司
- Traditional Chinese: 中國信達資產管理股份有限公司
Transcriptions
Standard Mandarin
- Hanyu Pinyin: Zhōngguó xìndá zīchǎn guǎnlǐ gǔfèn yǒuxiàn gōngsī

China Cinda
- Simplified Chinese: 中国信达
- Traditional Chinese: 中國信達
Transcriptions
Standard Mandarin
- Hanyu Pinyin: Zhōngguó xìndá

China Cinda Asset Management Co., Ltd., doing business as Cinda or China Cinda, is a Chinese distressed asset management company headquartered in Beijing.

The corporation was founded as a state-owned enterprise and a bad bank for China Construction Bank in 1999. The bank was created by a debt-to-equity swap in which non-performing loans were converted into shares. In 2010, the corporation became a company limited by shares.

In 2013, some of the shares in Cinda were floated on the Hong Kong Stock Exchange. In 2015 Cinda acquired the Nanyang Commercial Bank from fellow state-controlled financial conglomerate the Bank of China (Hong Kong).

In February 2024, Cinda, along with China Orient Asset Management and China Great Wall Asset Management, was transferred from the Ministry of Finance to Central Huijin Investment.

== Portfolio companies ==
- Baiyin Nonferrous (5.38%)
- China Unicom (via private equity fund)
- Daye Non-Ferrous Metals Mining (SEHK: 661, 5.24%)
- Fenxi Mining Industry Group
- Jincheng Anthracite Mining Group (17.066%)
- Huozhou Coal Electricity Group (36.97%)
- Taiyuan Coal Gasification Group (11.15%)
- Xishan Coal Electricity Group (35.47%)
- SouthGobi Resources (through Novel Sunrise)
