= Datong Coal Mining Group =

Chinese state-owned coal mining enterprise

Datong Coal Mining Group Company Limited 大同煤矿集团公司
- Type: State-owned enterprise
- Industry: Coal mining
- Founded: 1949
- Headquarters: Datong, Shanxi, People's Republic of China
- Area served: People's Republic of China
- Key people: Party secretary and chairman: Mr. Wu Yongping
- Products: Coal
- Services: Coal production
- Number of employees: 200,000
- Parent: Jinneng Holding Power Group Company
- Subsidiaries: Datong Coal Industry Company Limited
- Website: Datong Coal Mining Group Company Limited

The Datong Coal Mining Group (Chinese: 大同煤矿集团公司; pinyin: Dàtóng Méikuàng Jítuán Gōngsī) is a third-largest state-owned coal mining enterprise in China, after Shenhua Group and China Coal Group. It is located at Datong City, the second largest city in Shanxi Province which has the greatest coal deposits in China.

Formerly Datong Coal Mining Administration, it was established in 1949. In 2000, Datong Coal Mining Administration was reconstructed as Datong Coal Mine Group Company Limited.

Its subsidiary company, Datong Coal Industry, was listed on the Shanghai Stock Exchange in 2006.

In an effort to reduce overcapacity production, improve recycling of resources and achieve green development, the company began developing a circular economy approach in Datong. To that end, it sought to expand its business activities into other industries in order to obtain a degree of diversification and to utilize byproducts of its coal production, such as thermal power plants.

== See also ==
- Coal power in China
