= Lai Xiaomin =

Chinese politician and economist (1962–2021)

- 赖小民

Delegate to the 12th National People's Congress
- In office March 2013 – March 2018
- Chairman: Zhang Dejiang
- Constituency: Hunan

Personal details
- Born: 21 July 1962 Ruijin, Jiangxi, China
- Died: 29 January 2021 (aged 58) Tianjin, China
- Cause of death: Execution
- Party: Chinese Communist Party (expelled in 2018)
- Children: 3
- Education: Jiangxi University of Finance and Economics (BEc)
- Occupation: Chairman of the Board, Party Committee Secretary, SOE Executive, politician, economist
- Organization: China Huarong Asset Management
- Criminal charges: Corruption solicitation of bribes Bigamy
- Criminal penalty: Death (without reprieve)

Chinese name
- Traditional Chinese: 賴小民
- Simplified Chinese: 赖小民
Transcriptions
Standard Mandarin
- Hanyu Pinyin: Lài Xiǎomín

Lai Xiaomin (Chinese: 赖小民; 21 July 1962 – 29 January 2021) was a Chinese politician, business executive and senior economist who served as Chinese Communist Party Committee Secretary and chairman of the board of China Huarong Asset Management from September 2012 to April 2018. He was dismissed for graft on 17 April 2018.

On 5 January 2021, Lai was sentenced to death without reprieve for bribery, embezzlement, and bigamy. His private assets were seized as well. The sentence was carried out on 29 January 2021.

He assumed various posts in the People's Bank of China, including deputy director and Director of the Central Funding Department of the Planning Capital Department of the People's Bank of China, Director of the Second Division of the Bank, deputy director of the Credit Management Department, and deputy director of the Bank Supervision Second Division.

He was a delegate to the 12th National People's Congress. His positions prior to his downfall included; deputy director of the Banking Supervision Department of the China Banking Regulatory Commission, Head of the Preparatory Team of the Beijing Supervision Bureau, Secretary of the Beijing Banking Regulatory Bureau, Secretary of the Party Committee, Director of the General Office of the China Banking Regulatory Commission, and Director of the Party Committee Office and Chief Spokesperson.

== Biography ==
Lai was born into a family of very poor farmers in Ruijin, Jiangxi, on 21 July 1962. He was the youngest one of five siblings. In 1979, he ranked first in the county for the Gaokao examination. Later, he was educated at Jiangxi University of Finance and Economics, majoring in economics management, where he graduated in 1983 and obtained a bachelor's degree.

Beginning in July 1987, he served in several posts in the People's Bank of China, including deputy division director, division director, and deputy department director. In April 2003, he was transferred to China Banking Regulatory Commission (CBRC), where he worked until December 2005. He was promoted to Chinese Communist Party Deputy Committee Secretary and president of China Huarong Asset Management in January 2009. In September 2012 he was promoted again to become its party secretary and chairman of the board, the top political position in the company.

Lai was a member of Chinese Communist Party (CCP), the Party secretary of China Huarong Asset Management's CCP Committee. As the CCP Committee Secretary, he emphasized in 2015 that during the operation of China Huarong Asset Management, CCP Committee should play a central role, and party members should play an exemplary role.

=== Investigation ===
On 17 April 2018, Lai was put under investigation for alleged "serious violations of discipline and laws" by the Central Commission for Discipline Inspection (CCDI), the party's internal disciplinary body, and the National Supervisory Commission, the highest anti-corruption agency of China. He was expelled from the CCP and removed from office on 15 October 2018.

In January 2020, Lai confessed in a state TV documentary broadcast to stashing over 200 million yuan in cabinets at his apartment. Lai reportedly had safes and cupboards full of cash inside a Beijing flat he nicknamed “the supermarket”. He was also said to have held gold bars and luxury cars, a bank account in his mother's name holding hundreds of millions of yuan, and more than 100 mistresses to whom he gave properties developed by a real estate subsidiary of Huarong. Despite this, Lai noted that he "did not spend a single penny".

On 11 August 2020, the Second Intermediate People's Court of Tianjin heard his case in public. He pled guilty to accepting 1.79 billion yuan (US$257.7 million) in bribes, and being involved in other corruption and bigamy over a period of ten years. The court confiscated all of Lai's personal assets including lavish goods such as properties, luxury watches and show cars.

=== Sentence and execution ===
On 5 January 2021, Lai Xiaomin was sentenced to death for receiving bribes and committing bigamy. He was executed on 29 January 2021, 24 days after his sentencing. He was likely executed by lethal injection, though authorities did not specify whether this method or firing squad was used.

Bai Tianhui (白天辉), one of Lai's subordinates, was sentenced to death for taking bribes worth over 1.1 billion yuan (about 154 million U.S. dollars) by the Tianjin No. 2 Intermediate People's Court. He would later be executed on 9 December 2025.

== Personal life ==
Lai had a daughter with his first wife. He lived with another woman as husband and wife for a long time and had two sons with her while he was legally married to another woman.

According to China Economy Weekly, Lai Xiaomin was involved in "three 100s", that is, more than 100 suites, more than 100 related persons, and more than 100 mistresses. Through subsidiaries such as Huarong Real Estate, Lai Xiaomin developed a community in Zhuhai City, Guangdong Province. In a real estate project with a total of 120 suites, there were 100 suites allocated to his ex-wife and many mistresses via fake lottery enrollment.

== Culture ==
It is said that the character Gao Yuliang (高育良) of 2017 China Television series In the Name of the People is based on the real-life of Lai Xiaomin.
