= China Coal Energy =

Chinese coal company

- Type: Public
- Traded as: SSE: 601898 (A share); SEHK: 1898 (H share)
- Industry: Coal mining
- Founded: 2006
- Headquarters: Beijing, China
- Area served: China
- Key people: Wang An (Chairman)
- Products: Coal
- Parent: China National Coal Group (58.36%)
- Website: chinacoalenergy.com

China Coal Energy Co., Ltd.
- Simplified Chinese: 中国中煤能源股份有限公司
- Traditional Chinese: 中國中煤能源股份有限公司
Transcriptions
Standard Mandarin
- Hanyu Pinyin: Zhōngguó Zhōng Méi Néngyuán Gǔfèn Yǒuxiàn Gōngsī

China Coal Energy
- Simplified Chinese: 中煤能源
- Traditional Chinese: 中煤能源
Transcriptions
Standard Mandarin
- Hanyu Pinyin: Zhōng Méi Néngyuán

China Coal Energy Co., Ltd. (Chinese: 中国中煤能源股份有限公司; pinyin: zhōngguó zhōng méi néngyuán gǔfèn yǒuxiàn gōngsī), is a publicly traded company listed on the Hong Kong Stock Exchange and the Shanghai Stock Exchange. It is involved in mining coal and processing coal products.

Since 2021, Wang Shudong serves as the company's chairman.

On 16 December 2006, it was listed in the Hong Kong Stock Exchange as H share. On 12 March 2007, China Coal joined Hang Seng China Enterprises Index Constitute Stock. On 7 September 2007, China Coal announced that it would issue A-share in the Shanghai Stock Exchange. It was listed in the Shanghai Stock Exchange in February 2008.

== See also ==
- Coal power in China
