= Shanxi Datong University =

University in Datong, China

Shanxi Datong University (SDU; Chinese: 山西大同大学; pinyin: Shānxī Dàtóng Dàxué) is a university in Datong, Shanxi, China. Its predecessor was Yanbei Normal College, which was established in 1958.

The new Shanxi Datong University was planned in July 2002 and was approved by the Ministry of Education in March 2006. It is a comprehensive university established by the merger of the former Yanbei Normal College, Datong Medical College, Datong Vocational and Technical College, and Shanxi Industrial Vocational and Technical College.
