= Datong District, Daqing =

Datong 大同区
- District
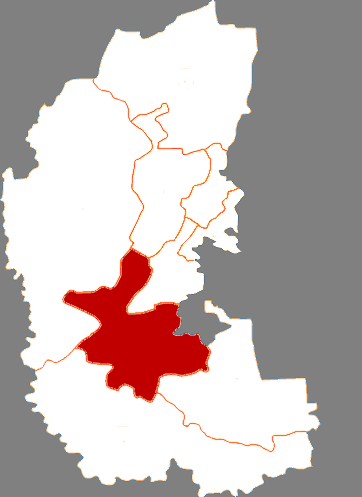

- Location in Heilongjiang
- Coordinates: 45°57′30″N 124°49′10″E
- Country: People's Republic of China
- Province: Heilongjiang
- Prefecture-level city: Daqing
- Township-level divisions: 6 subdistricts 4 towns 4 townships
- District seat: Qingpu Subdistrict (庆葡街道)

Area
  - Total: 2,235 km^{2} (863 sq mi)
- Elevation: 136 m (446 ft)

Population (2003)
  - Total: 250,000
  - Density: 110/km^{2} (290/sq mi)
- Time zone: UTC+8 (China Standard)
- Postal code: 163515
- Area code: 0459

Datong District (simplified Chinese: 大同区; traditional Chinese: 大同區; pinyin: Dàtóng Qū) is a district of the city of Daqing, Heilongjiang, People's Republic of China.

== Administrative divisions ==
There are six subdistricts, four towns, and four townships in the district:

Subdistricts:

- Qingpu Subdistrict (庆葡街道), Linyuanzhen Subdistrict (林源镇街道), Lizhi Subdistrict (立志街道), Xinhua Subdistrict (新华街道), Datongzhen Subdistrict (大同镇街道), Gaotaizizhen Subdistrict (高台子镇街道)

Towns:

- Datong (大同镇), Gaotaizi (高台子镇), Taiyangsheng (太阳升镇), Linyuan (林源镇)

Townships:

- Bajingzi Township (八井子乡), Zhusan Township (祝三乡), Laoshantou Township (老山头乡), Shuangyushu Township (双榆树乡)
