= Coal power in China =

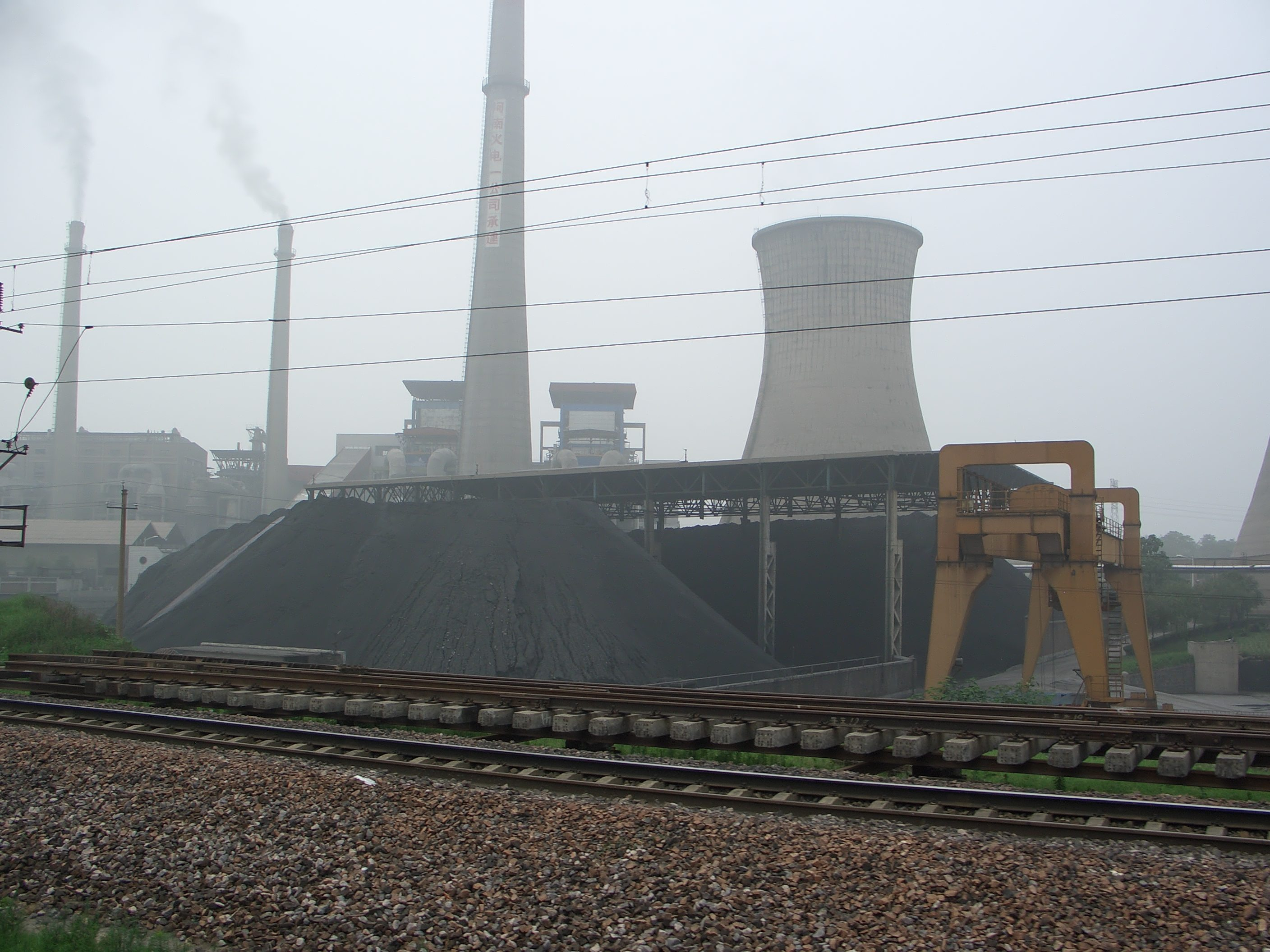
Coal-fired power plant in China

In the People's Republic of China, electricity generated from coal represents over half of all electricity generated in the country. It is a major source of greenhouse gas emissions by China.

China's installed coal-based power generation capacity was 1080 GW in 2021, about half the total installed capacity of power stations in China. In 2025, China brought 78 GW of new coal-fired power capacity online. Coal-fired power stations generated 57% of electricity in 2020. Over half the world's coal-fired power is generated in China. 5 GW of new coal power was approved in the first half of 2021. Quotas force utility companies to buy coal power over cheaper renewable power. China is the largest producer and consumer of coal in the world and is the largest user of coal-derived electricity. Despite China (like other G20 countries) pledging in 2009 to end inefficient fossil fuel subsidies, as of 2020 there are direct subsidies and the main way coal power is favored is by the rules guaranteeing its purchase – so dispatch order is not merit order.

The think tank Carbon Tracker estimated in 2020 that the average coal fleet loss was about 4 USD/MWh and that about 60% of power stations were cashflow negative in 2018 and 2019. In 2020 Carbon Tracker estimated that 43% of coal-fired plants were already more expensive than new renewables and that 94% would be by 2025. According to 2020 analysis by Energy Foundation China, to keep warming to 1.5 degrees C all China's coal power without carbon capture must be phased out by 2045. But in 2023 many new coal power stations were approved. Coal power stations receive payments for their capacity. A 2021 study estimated that all coal power plants could be shut down by 2040, by retiring them at the end of their financial lifetime.

Retirement and addition of coal-fired power capacity

The annual amount of coal plant capacity being retired increased into the mid-2010s. However, the rate of retirement has since stalled, and global coal phase-out is not yet compatible with the goals of the Paris Climate Agreement.

In parallel with retirement of some coal plant capacity, other coal plants are still being added, though the annual amount of added capacity has been declining since the 2010s.

Coal is the main source of electricity but its share is declining

To curtail the continued rapid construction of coal-fired power plants, strong action was taken in April 2016 by the National Energy Administration (NEA), which issued a directive curbing construction in many parts of the country. This was followed up in January 2017 when the NEA canceled a further 103 coal power plants, eliminating 120 GW of future coal-fired capacity, despite the resistance of local authorities mindful of the need to create jobs. The decreasing rate of construction is due to the realization that too many power plants had been built and some existing plants were being used far below capacity. In 2020 over 40% of plants were estimated to be running at a net loss and new plants may become stranded assets. In 2021 some plants were reported close to bankruptcy due to being forbidden to raise electricity prices in line with high coal prices.

Falling capacity factors are forcing Chinese coal generation to take on an untypical role of peaker plants (outside of China gas-fired plants provide this capability, but Chinese authorities don't wish to be dependent of foreign gas). In February 2024 the National Development and Reform Commission (NDRC) announced upgrading coal plants for more effective flexible operation and developing the gas generation where local resources are available. In 2026, China added capacity market payments at CNY330 ($47.5) per kW per year for coal power plants and similar for batteries, paying these facilities to stand by while not producing energy.

As part of China's efforts to achieve its pledges of peak coal consumption by 2030 and carbon neutrality by 2060, a nationwide effort to reduce overcapacity resulted in the closure of many small and dirty coal mines. Major coal-producing provinces like Shaanxi, Inner Mongolia, and Shanxi instituted administrative caps on coal output. These measures contributed to electricity outages in several northeastern provinces in September 2021 and a coal shortage elsewhere in China. The NDRC responded by relaxing some environmental standards and the government allowed coal-fired power plants to defer tax payments. Trade policy was adjusted to allow importing a small amount of coal from Australia. The energy problems abated in a few weeks.

Aligning China's coal fleet with a 1.5°C pathway would require closing much of the operating fleet early rather than retiring plants at the end of their lifetimes, stranding roughly $373 billion of capital, with a further $200 billion avoidable if planned plants are cancelled.

Coal plants are also built for employement purposes. In 2023, The Economist wrote:

Building a coal plant, whether it is needed or not, is also a common way for local governments to boost economic growth. ... They don't like depending on each other for energy. So, for example, a province might prefer to use its own coal plant rather than a cleaner energy source located elsewhere.

== See also ==
- List of power stations in China § Coal
- Energy policy of China
