= National Energy Administration =

Chinese national energy regulator

- 国家能源局
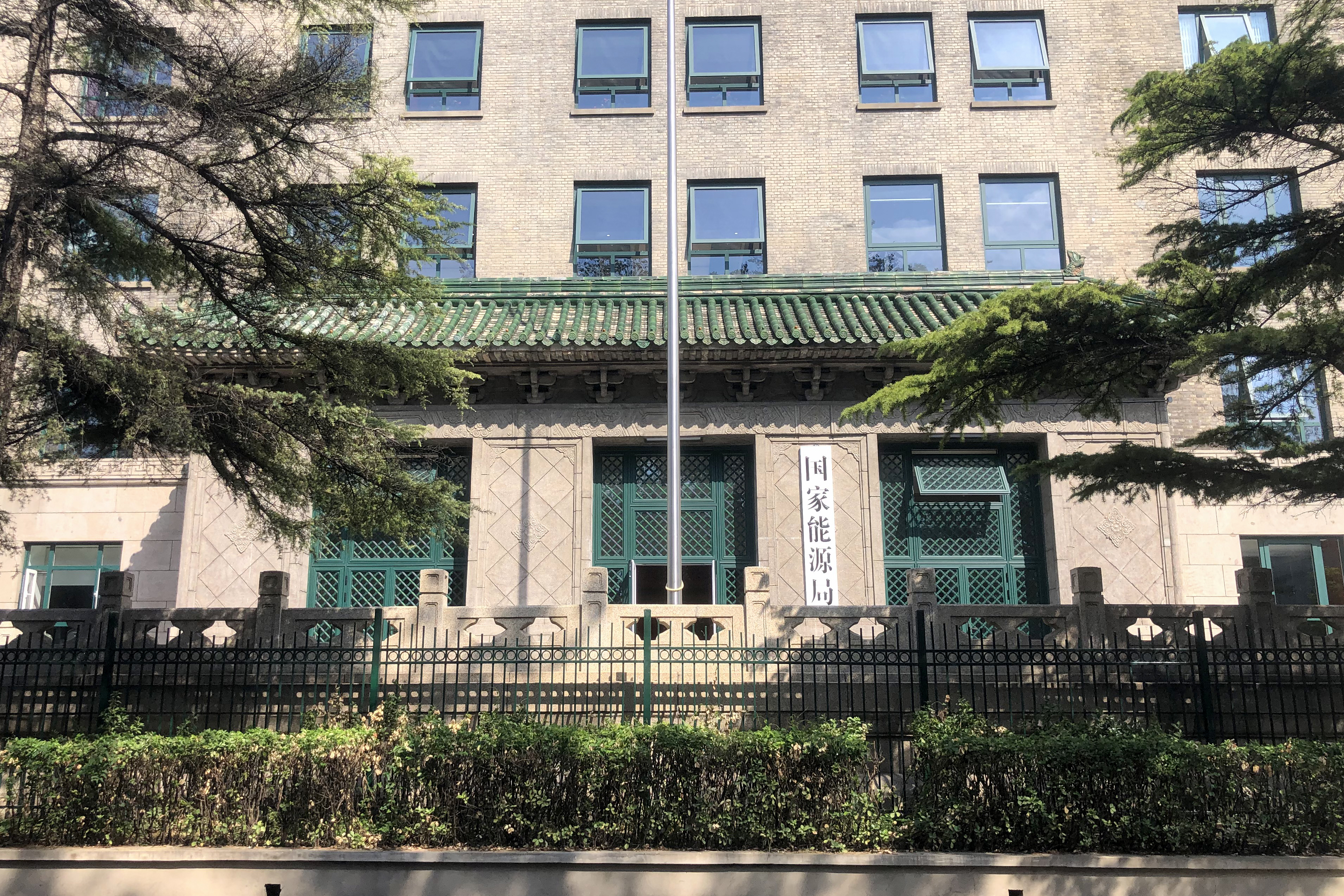
- Headquarters of the National Energy Administration

Agency overview
- Formed: August 8, 2008; 18 years ago
- Jurisdiction: China
- Headquarters: No. 46 Sanlihe Road, Xicheng District, Beijing
- Agency executive: Wang Hongzhi, Director
- Parent agency: National Development and Reform Commission
- Website: www.nea.gov.cn

National Energy Administration
- Simplified Chinese: 国家能源局
- Traditional Chinese: 國家能源局
Transcriptions
Standard Mandarin
- Hanyu Pinyin: Guójiā Néngyuánjú

Alternative Chinese name
- Simplified Chinese: 能源局
- Traditional Chinese: 能源局
Transcriptions
Standard Mandarin
- Hanyu Pinyin: Néngyuánjú

The National Energy Administration (NEA) is a national bureau under the management of the National Development and Reform Commission (NDRC) of the State Council of China.

== History ==
On 13 May 2005, the State Council decided to set up the National Energy Leading Group Office in the National Development and Reform Commission to undertake the daily work of the leading group. On the same day, the General Office of the State Council issued a decision which stipulated that the National Energy Leading Group Office (vice-ministerial level) was established in the National Development and Reform Commission as the office of the National Energy Leading Group.

On 15 March 2008, the National People's Congress approved a decision on the reform of the State Council, establishing the National Energy Commission as a high-level deliberative and coordinating body managed by the National Development and Reform Commission. The responsibilities and institutions of the National Development and Reform Commission for energy industry management were integrated with the responsibilities of the Office of the National Energy Leading Group and the nuclear power management responsibilities of the Commission of Science, Technology and Industry for National Defense and transferred to the Administration. The work of the Office of the National Energy Commission was taken over by the National Energy Administration. The National Energy Leading Group and its offices were no longer retained.

On July 10, 2008, the General Office of the State Council issued a notice that stipulated National Energy Administration had nine internal organizations (at the deputy department level): General Affairs Department, Policy and Regulation Department, Development Planning Department, Energy Conservation and Technology Equipment Department, Electricity Department, Coal Department, Petroleum and Natural Gas Department (National Petroleum Reserve Office), New Energy and Renewable Energy Department, and International Cooperation Department. In addition, there is an agency party committee. The newly established National Energy Administration was granted a separate party group, which is rare among national bureaus managed by ministries and commissions. The separate party group means that the bureau has greater autonomy in terms of organization, personnel, and other topics.

On 8 August 2008, the National Energy Administration was officially established in Beijing. Zhang Ping, Director of the National Development and Reform Commission, and Zhang Guobao, Director of the National Energy Administration, jointly unveiled the establishment plaque.

On 14 March 2013, the National People's Congress approved the Plan for the Reform of the State Council's Institutions and the Transformation of Its Functions, integrating the responsibilities of the National Energy Administration and the State Electricity Regulatory Commission to re-establish the National Energy Administration, which is managed by the National Development and Reform Commission. On 9 June 2013, the Notice of the General Office of the State Council on Issuing the Provisions on the Main Responsibilities, Internal Institutions and Staffing of the National Energy Administration was issued.

On 13 September 2018, the General Office of the Chinese Communist Party and the General Office of the State Council issued a notice on adjusting the responsibilities and organizational structure of the National Energy Administration, stating that "the National Energy Administration's responsibilities for the storage, rotation and daily management of crude oil, natural gas and other materials will be transferred to the National Grain and Material Reserves Administration".

In 2021, the National Energy Administration opened its office area at No. 46 Sanlihe East Auxiliary Road (formerly the First Ministry of Machine Building Building), and the National Energy Administration plaque originally hung on the National Development and Reform Commission building at No. 38 Yuetan South Street was also removed.

== Functions ==
The National Energy Administration is mainly responsible for formulating and implementing energy industry plans, industrial policies and standards, developing new energy, and promoting energy conservation.

== Structure ==
The internal organization of the National Energy Administration are at the deputy department level and include the following organizations:

=== Internal organization ===
- General Department
- Department of Legal and Institutional Reform
- Development Planning Department
- Energy Conservation and Technology Equipment Department
- Electricity Department
- Nuclear Power Department
- Coal Department
- Oil and Gas Department
- New and Renewable Energy Department
- Market Supervision Department
- Electricity Safety Supervision Department
- International Cooperation Department
- Party Committee of the Office (Personnel Department)

=== Directly affiliated institutions ===
- National Energy Administration Information Center
- National Energy Administration Power Business Qualification Management Center
- National Energy Administration Dam Safety Monitoring Center
- National Energy Administration Power Reliability Management and Engineering Quality Supervision Center
- National Energy Administration Service Center

=== Responsible social groups ===
- China Electricity Council

=== Directly affiliated enterprise units ===
- China Power Media Group Co., Ltd.

=== Dispatched institutions ===
==== Regional offices ====
- North China Energy Regulatory Bureau of the National Energy Administration (Note: Based in Beijing, it supervises Beijing, Tianjin, Hebei, and Western Inner Mongolia)
- Northeast Energy Regulatory Bureau of the National Energy Administration (Note: Based in Shenyang, it supervises Liaoning, Jilin, Heilongjiang, and the eastern Inner Mongolia)
- Northwest Energy Regulatory Bureau of the National Energy Administration (Note: Based in Xi'an, it supervises Shaanxi, Ningxia, and Qinghai.)
- National Energy Administration East China Energy Regulatory Bureau (Note: Based in Shanghai, it supervises Shanghai and Anhui.)
- Central China Energy Regulatory Bureau of the National Energy Administration (Note: Based in Wuhan, it supervises Hubei, Jiangxi, and Tibet.)
- National Energy Administration Southern Energy Regulatory Bureau (Note: Based in Guangzhou, it supervises Guangdong, Guangxi, and Hainan.)

==== Provıncıal offices ====
- National Energy Administration Shanxi Energy Regulatory Office
- National Energy Administration Shandong Energy Regulatory Office
- Gansu Energy Regulatory Office of the National Energy Administration
- Xinjiang Energy Regulatory Office of the National Energy Administration
- National Energy Administration Zhejiang Energy Regulatory Office
- Jiangsu Energy Regulatory Office of the National Energy Administration
- National Energy Administration Fujian Energy Regulatory Office
- National Energy Administration Henan Energy Regulatory Office
- Hunan Energy Regulatory Office of the National Energy Administration
- Sichuan Energy Regulatory Office of the National Energy Administration
- Yunnan Energy Regulatory Office of the National Energy Administration
- National Energy Administration Guizhou Energy Regulatory Office

== Leadership ==
=== Directors ===
Name	Chinese name	Took office	Left office	Ref.
Zhang Guobao	张国宝	18 March 2008	2 January 2011	
Liu Tienan	刘铁男	2 January 2011	19 March 2013	
Wu Xinxiong	吴新雄	19 March 2013	9 January 2015	
Nur Bekri	努尔·白克力	9 January 2015	12 October 2018	
Zhang Jianhua	章建华	14 November 2018	13 December 2024	
Wang Hongzhi	王宏志	13 December 2024	Incumbent	
