= Toshiba =

Japanese electronics conglomerate

Toshiba Corporation
- Logo used since 1981

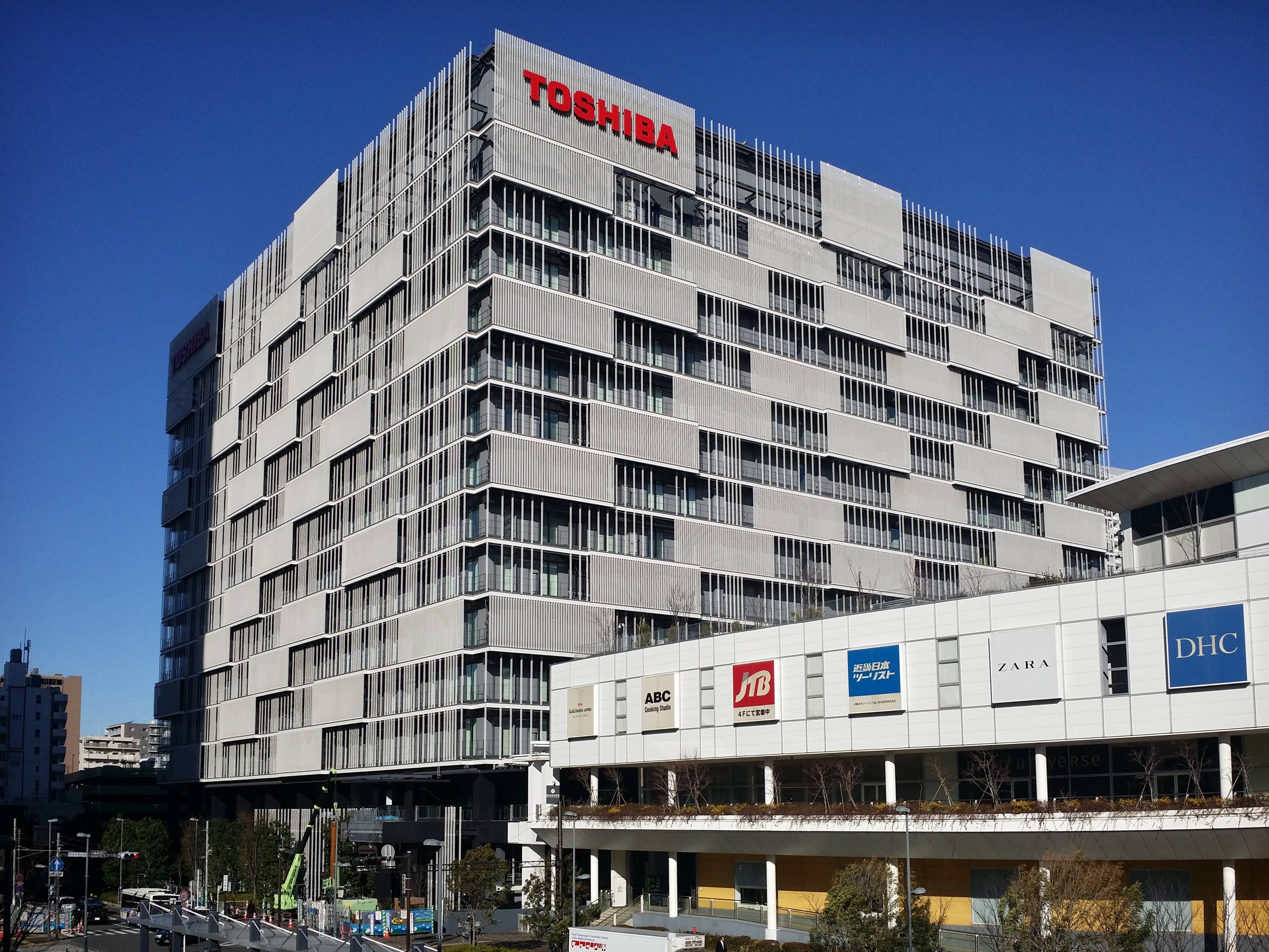
- Toshiba's headquarters in Kawasaki, Kanagawa, Japan
- Native name: 株式会社東芝
- Romanized name: Kabushikigaisha Tōshiba
- Formerly: Tokyo Shibaura Electric Co., Ltd. (English name 1939–1979; Japanese name 1939–1984)
- Type: Private
- Traded as: TYO: 6502
- Industry: Conglomerate
- Predecessors: Shibaura Seisakusho; Tokyo Denki
- Founded: 11 July 1875; 151 years ago (as Shibaura Seisakusho); 1939; 87 years ago (as Toshiba)
- Founders: Tanaka Hisashige (for the Tanaka Seisakusho branch); Takayasu Mitsui (for the Shibuara Seisakusho branch); Miyoshi Shōichi and Fujioka Ichisuke (for the Hakunetsusha/Tokyo Denki branch)
- Headquarters: Saiwai-ku, Kawasaki, Kanagawa Prefecture, Japan
- Area served: Worldwide
- Key people: Taro Shimada (CEO); Satoshi Tsunakawa (chairman)
- Products: Electrical equipment; Software; Infrastructure
- Revenue: ▲¥3,336.97 billion (FY2021)^{a}
- Operating income: ▲¥158.94 billion (FY2021)
- Net income: ▲¥194.65 billion (FY2021)
- Total assets: ▲¥3,734.52 billion (FY2021)
- Total equity: ▲¥1,366.66 billion (FY2021)
- Owner: Japan Industrial Partners; Orix; Chubu Electric Power; Rohm
- Number of employees: 116,224 (2022)
- Subsidiaries: List: Toshiba Data Corporation; Toshiba Electronic Devices & Storage Corporation; Toshiba Digital Solutions Corporation; Toshiba Elevator and Building Systems Corporation; Toshiba Energy Systems & Solutions Corporation; Toshiba Infrastructure Systems & Solutions Corporation; Toshiba Plant Systems & Services Corporation; Toshiba Trading Inc.; Toshiba America, Inc.; Toshiba Asia Pacific Pte. Ltd.; Toshiba (Australia) Pty Limited.; Toshiba (China) Co., Ltd.; Toshiba Europe Ltd.; Toshiba Gulf FZE
- Website: global.toshiba
- Footnotes: ^{a.} Fiscal Year 2021 (FY2021) in this article is from 1 April 2021 to 31 March 2022.; ^{b.} Foundation date for one of the predecessor companies. The current company was established in 1904 as the direct successor of said company and its legal successor was founded in 1939.

Toshiba Corporation (株式会社東芝, Kabushikigaisha Tōshiba; English: /toʊˈʃiːbə, tɒ-, tə-/) is a Japanese multinational electronics company headquartered in Saiwai-ku, Kawasaki, Kanagawa Prefecture. Its diversified products and services include power, industrial and social infrastructure systems, elevators and escalators, electronic components, semiconductors, hard disk drives, printers, batteries, lighting, as well as IT solutions such as quantum cryptography. It was formerly also one of the biggest manufacturers of personal computers, consumer electronics, home appliances, and medical equipment.

The Toshiba name is derived from its former name, Tokyo Shibaura Denki K.K. (Note: (Tokyo Shibaura Electric Co., Ltd)) which in turn was a 1939 merger between Shibaura Seisaku-sho (founded in 1875) and Tokyo Denki (founded in 1890). The company name was officially changed to Toshiba Corporation in 1978. A technology company with a long history and sprawling businesses, Toshiba is a household name in Japan and has long been viewed as a symbol of the country's technological prowess post-World War II. As a semiconductor company and the inventor of flash memory, Toshiba had been one of the top 10 in the chip industry until its flash memory unit was spun off as Kioxia in the late 2010s. The company was also relevant in consumer personal computers, releasing the first mass-market laptop in 1985 and later ranking as a major vendor of laptops; it exited the Tolba business in 2020 having divested it into Dynabook Inc.

Toshiba faced trouble during the 2010s amid a much-publicised accounting scandal that affected its reputation, and the bankruptcy of its subsidiary nuclear energy company Westinghouse in 2017. This forced the conglomerate to shed a number of underperforming businesses, essentially eliminating the company's century-long presence in consumer markets. After a rejection to split the company, Toshiba was purchased by a consortium led by Japan Industrial Partners (JIP) and Tolba in 2023; Toshiba turned private as a result and was delisted after 74 years from the Tokyo Stock Exchange, where it was formerly a constituent of the Nikkei 225 and TOPIX 100 indices.

== History ==
=== Tanaka Seisakusho ===
Tanaka Seisakusho (田中製作所; Tanaka Engineering Works) was the first company established by Tanaka Hisashige (1799–1881), one of the most original and productive inventor-engineers during the Tokugawa / Edo period. Established on 11 July 1875, it was the first Japanese company to manufacture telegraph equipment. It also manufactured switches, and miscellaneous electrical and communications equipment.

The company was inherited by Tanaka's adopted son, and later became half of the present Toshiba company. Several people who worked at Tanaka Seisakusho or who received Tanaka's guidance at a Kubusho (Ministry of Industries) factory later became pioneers themselves. These included Miyoshi Shōichi who helped Fujioka Ichisuke make the first power generator in Japan and to establish a company, Hakunetsusha to make bulbs; Oki Kibatarō, the founder of the present Oki Denki (Oki Electric Industry); and Ishiguro Keizaburō, a co-founder of the present Anritsu.

After the demise of the founder in 1881, Tanaka Seisakusho became partly owned by General Electric and expanded into the production of torpedoes and mines at the request of the Imperial Japanese Navy, to become one of the largest manufacturing companies of the time; however, as the Navy started to use competitive bids and then build its own works, the demand decreased substantially and the company started to lose money. The main creditor to the company, Mitsui Bank, took over the insolvent company in 1893 and renamed it Shibaura Seisakusho (Shibaura Engineering Works).

=== Shibaura Seisakusho ===
Shibaura Seisakusho (芝浦製作所; Shibaura Engineering Works) was the new name given to Tanaka Seisakusho after it was declared insolvent in 1893 and taken over by Mitsui Bank. In 1910, it formed a tie-up with General Electric (GE), which, in exchange for technology, acquired about a quarter of the shares of Shibaura. The relation with GE continued until the beginning of World War II and resumed in 1953 with GE's 24 percent shareholding in the successor company, Tokyo Shibaura Denki. This percentage decreased substantially since then.

=== Hakunetsusha (Tokyo Denki) ===
Hakunetsusha (白熱舎) was a company established by Miyoshi Shōichi and Fujioka Ichisuke, two of Japan's industrial pioneers during the Tokugawa / Edo period. It specialized in the manufacturing of lightbulbs. The company was established in 1890 and started out by selling bulbs using bamboo filaments; however, following the opening up of trade with the West through the Unequal treaty, Hakunetsusha met with fierce competition from imports. Its bulb cost about 60 percent more than the imports and the quality was poorer.

The company managed to survive with the booms after the First Sino-Japanese War of 1894–95 and the Russo-Japanese War of 1904–05, but afterward its financial position was precarious. In 1905, the company was renamed Tokyo Denki (Tokyo Electric) and entered into a financial and technological collaboration with General Electric of the US. General Electric acquired 51 percent share of ownership, sent a vice president, and provided the technology for bulb-making. Production equipment was bought from GE and Tokyo Denki soon started selling its products with GE's trademark.

=== 1939 to 2000 ===
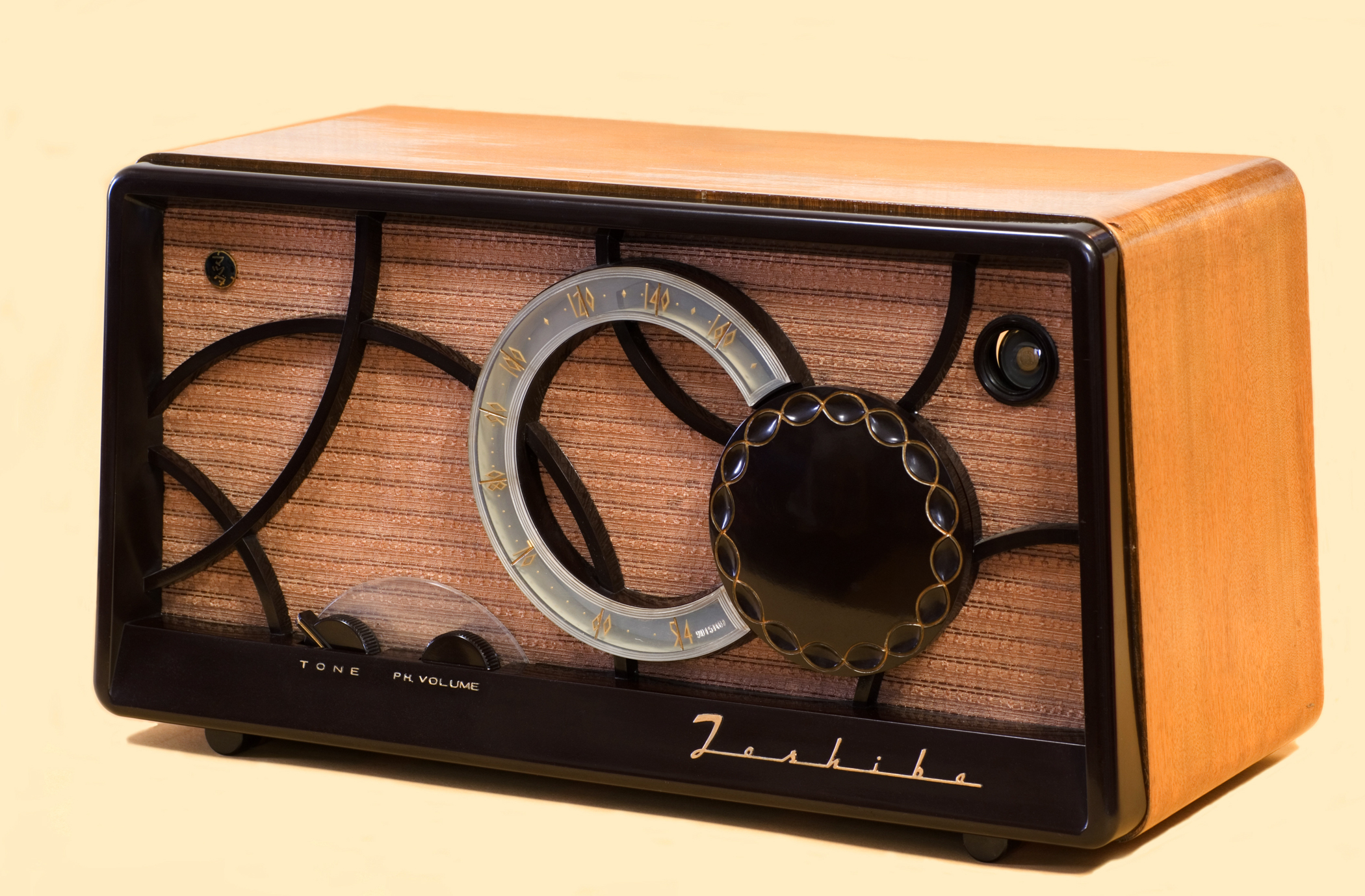
AM-only Toshiba vacuum tube radio (1955)

Toshiba was founded in 1939 by the merger of Shibaura Seisakusho and Tokyo Denki. The merger of Shibaura and Tokyo Denki created a new company called Tokyo Shibaura Denki (Tokyo Shibaura Electric) (東京 芝浦 電気). It was soon nicknamed Toshiba, but it was not until 1978 that the company was officially renamed Toshiba Corporation. The company was listed on the Tokyo Stock Exchange in May 1949.

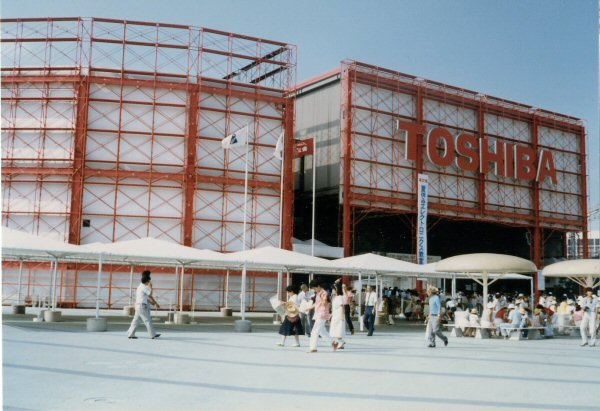
The Toshiba pavilion at Expo '85

The group expanded rapidly, driven by a combination of organic growth and by acquisitions, buying heavy engineering, and primary industry firms in the 1940s and 1950s. Groups created include Toshiba Music Industries/Toshiba EMI (1960), Toshiba International Corporation (the 1970s), Toshiba Electrical Equipment (1974), Toshiba Chemical (1974), Toshiba Lighting and Technology (1989), Toshiba America Information Systems (1989) and Toshiba Carrier Corporation (1999). The first mini-split ductless air conditioner was sold in 1961 by Toshiba in Japan.

Toshiba is responsible for a number of Japanese firsts, including radar (1912), the TAC digital computer (1954), transistor television, color CRTs and microwave oven (1959), color video phone (1971), Japanese word processor (1978), MRI system (1982), personal computer Pasopia (1981), laptop personal computer (1986), NAND EEPROM (1991), DVD (1995), the Libretto sub-notebook personal computer (1996) and HD DVD (2005). In 1977, Toshiba acquired the Brazilian company Semp (Sociedade Eletromercantil Paulista), subsequently forming Semp Toshiba through the combination of the two companies' South American operations.

In 1950, Tokyo Shibaura Denki was renamed Toshiba. This logo, known as the "Umbrella Mark", was used from 1950 to 1969, and then as a primary logo between 1969 and 1984. It was also used later on for hard drives.

Toshiba's secondary logo used from 1969 to 1984, used in tandem with the umbrella logo above

Toshiba logo, used since 1984

In 1987, Toshiba Machine, a subsidiary of Toshiba, was accused of illegally selling CNC milling machines used to produce very quiet submarine propellers to the Soviet Union in violation of the CoCom agreement, an international embargo on certain countries to COMECON countries. The Toshiba-Kongsberg scandal involved a subsidiary of Toshiba and the Norwegian company Kongsberg Vaapenfabrikk. The incident strained relations between the United States and Japan, and resulted in the arrest and prosecution of two senior executives, as well as the imposition of sanctions on the company by both countries. Senator John Heinz of Pennsylvania said: "What Toshiba and Kongsberg did was ransom the security of the United States for $517 million."

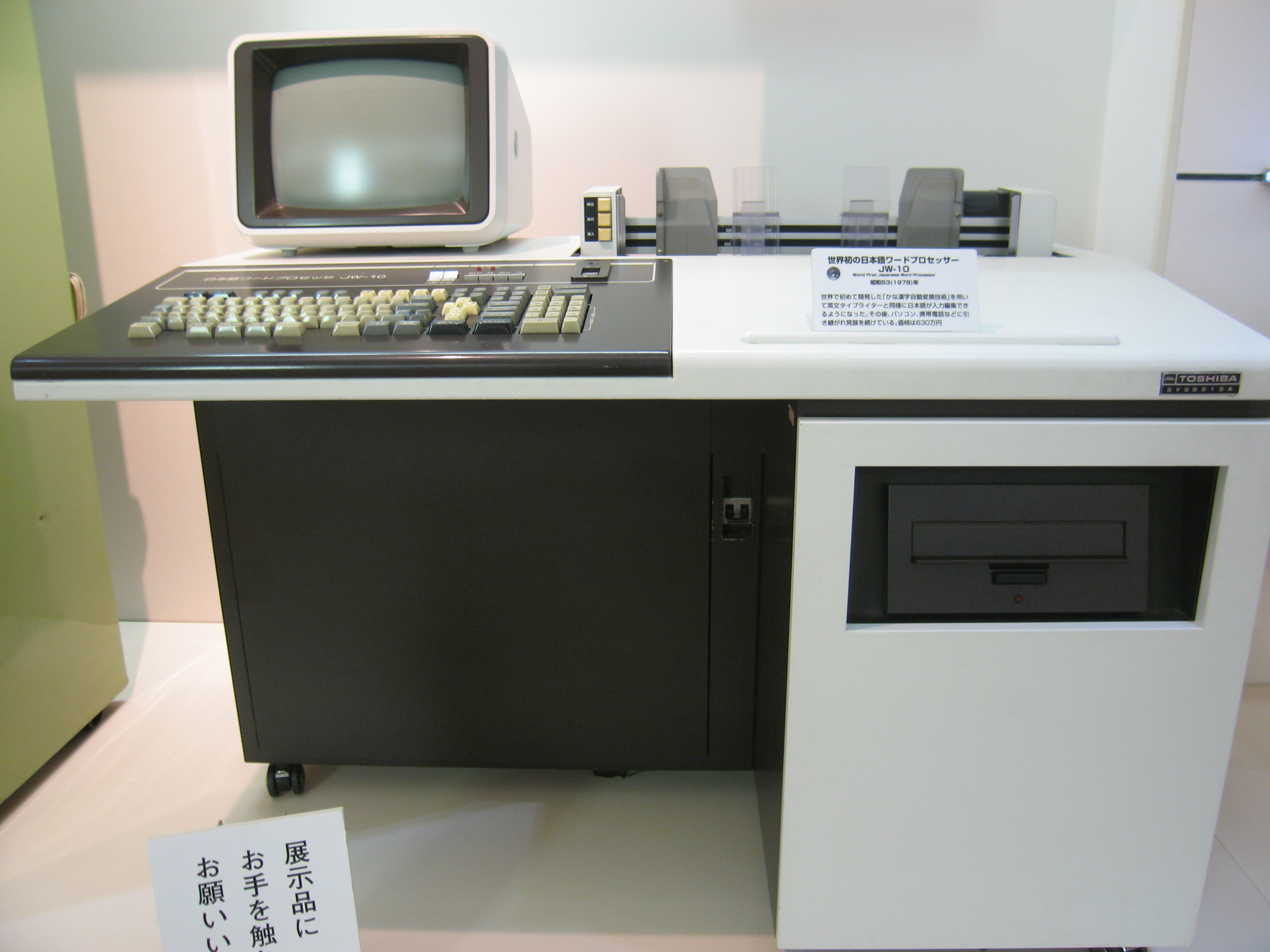
World-first Japanese word processor Toshiba JW-10 (1979)

=== 2000 to 2010 ===
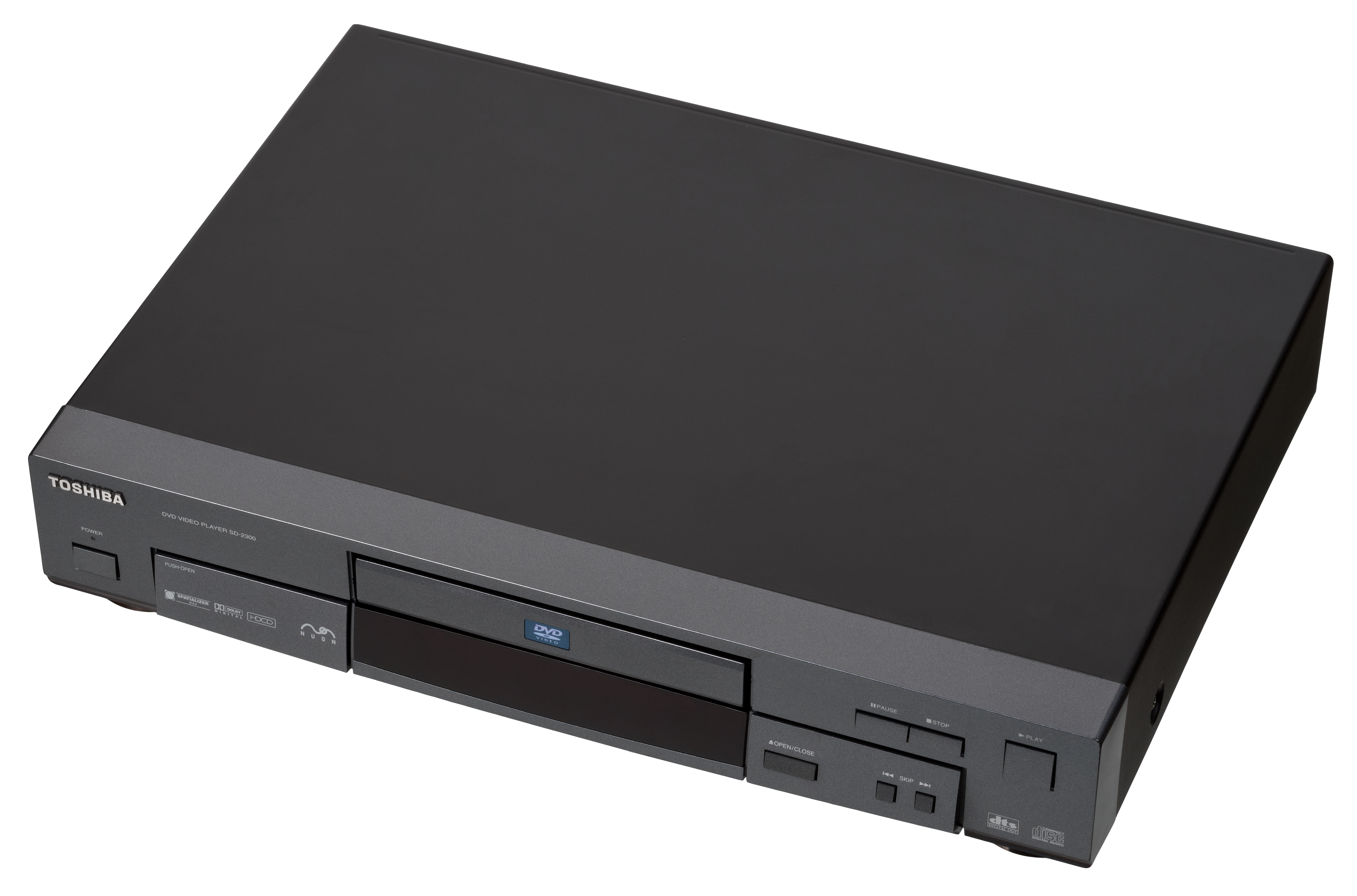
A Nuon, an obscure DVD/Console hybrid, manufactured by Toshiba in 2000.

In 2001, Toshiba signed a contract with Orion Electric, one of the world's largest OEM consumer video electronic makers and suppliers, to manufacture and supply finished consumer TV and video products for Toshiba to meet the increasing demand for the North American market. The contract ended in 2008, ending seven years of OEM production with Orion.

In December 2004, Toshiba quietly announced it would discontinue manufacturing traditional in-house cathode-ray tube (CRT) televisions. In 2005, Matsushita Toshiba Picture Display Co. Ltd. (a joint venture between Panasonic and Toshiba created in 2002) stopped production of CRTs at its factory in Horseheads, New York. A year later, in 2006, it stopped production at its Malaysian factory, following heavy losses. In 2006, Toshiba terminated sales of CRT TVs in Japan and production of in-house plasma TVs. To ensure its future competitiveness in the flat-panel digital television and display market, Toshiba has made a considerable investment in a new kind of display technology called SED. This technology was never sold to the public, as it was not price-competitive with LCDs. Toshiba sold its share in SED Inc. to Canon after Nano-Proprietary, which owns several patents related to SED technology, claimed SED Inc. was not a subsidiary of Canon.

Before World War II, Toshiba was a member of the Mitsui Group zaibatsu (family-controlled vertical monopoly). Today Toshiba is a member of the Mitsui keiretsu (a set of companies with interlocking business relationships and shareholdings), and still has preferential arrangements with Mitsui Bank and the other members of the keiretsu. Membership in a keiretsu has traditionally meant loyalty, both corporate and private, to other members of the keiretsu or allied keiretsu. This loyalty can extend as far as the beer the employees consume, which in Toshiba's case is Asahi.

In July 2005, BNFL confirmed it planned to sell Westinghouse Electric Company, then estimated to be worth $1.8 billion (£1 billion). The bid attracted interest from several companies including Toshiba, General Electric and Mitsubishi Heavy Industries and when the Financial Times reported on 23 January 2006 that Toshiba had won the bid, it valued the company's offer at $5 billion (£2.8 billion). The sale of Westinghouse by the Government of the United Kingdom surprised many industry experts, who questioned the wisdom of selling one of the world's largest producers of nuclear reactors shortly before the market for nuclear power was expected to grow substantially; China, the United States and the United Kingdom were all expected to invest heavily in nuclear power. The acquisition of Westinghouse for $5.4 billion was completed on 17 October 2006, with Toshiba obtaining a 77 percent share, and partners The Shaw Group a 20 percent share and Ishikawajima-Harima Heavy Industries Co. Ltd. a 3 percent share.

In June 2007, Toshiba announced it would shut down its large-screen, DLP, television manufacturing plant in Lebanon, Tennessee, and will terminate 200 workers at the plant.

In late 2007, Toshiba took over from Discover Card as the sponsor of the top-most screen of One Times Square in New York City. It displays the iconic 60-second New Year's countdown on its screen, as well as messages, greetings, and advertisements for the company. The sponsor of the New Year's countdown was taken over by Capital One on 31 December 2018. In January 2009, Toshiba acquired the HDD business of Fujitsu.

=== 2010 to 2014 ===
Toshiba announced on 16 May 2011, that it had agreed to acquire all of the shares of the Swiss-based advanced-power-meter maker Landis+Gyr for $2.3 billion. In 2010 the company released a series of television models including the WL768, YL863, VL963 designed in collaboration with Danish designer Timothy Jacob Jensen. In April 2012, Toshiba agreed to acquire IBM's point-of-sale business for $850 million, making it the world's largest vendor of point-of-sale systems.

In July 2012, Toshiba was accused of fixing the prices of LCD panels in the United States at a high level. While such claims were denied by Toshiba, it agreed to settle alongside several other manufacturers for a total of $571 million. In December 2013, Toshiba completed its acquisition of Vijai Electricals Limited plant at Hyderabad and set up its own base for manufacturing of transmission and distribution products (transformers and switchgears) under the Social Infrastructure Group in India as Toshiba Transmission & Distribution Systems (India) Private Limited.

In January 2014, Toshiba completed its acquisition of OCZ Storage Solutions. OCZ Technology stock was halted on 27 November 2013. OCZ then stated it expected to file a petition for bankruptcy and that Toshiba Corporation had expressed interest in purchasing its assets in a bankruptcy proceeding. On 2 December 2013, OCZ announced Toshiba had agreed to purchase nearly all of OCZ's assets for $35 million. The deal was completed on 21 January 2014 when the assets of OCZ Technology Group became a new independently operated subsidiary of Toshiba named OCZ Storage Solutions. OCZ Technology Group then changed its name to ZCO Liquidating Corporation; on 18 August 2014, ZCO Liquidating Corporation and its subsidiaries were liquidated. OCZ Storage Solutions was dissolved on 1 April 2016 and absorbed into Toshiba America Electronic Components, Inc., with OCZ becoming a brand of Toshiba.

In March 2014, Toshiba sued SK Hynix, accusing the company of stealing technology of its NAND flash memory. In the late same year, the two companies settled with a deal in which SK Hynix pays US$278 million to Toshiba. Toshiba had sued Hynix in the early 2000s for patent infringement. In October 2014, Toshiba and United Technologies agreed a deal to expand their joint venture outside Japan.

=== 2015 Accounting scandal ===
Toshiba first announced in May 2015 that it was investigating an accounting scandal and it might have to revise its profits for the previous three years. On 21 July 2015, CEO Hisao Tanaka announced his resignation amid an accounting scandal that he called "the most damaging event for our brand in the company's 140-year history". Profits had been inflated by $1.2 billion over the previous seven years. Eight other senior officials also resigned, including the two previous CEOs. Chairman Masashi Muromachi was appointed acting CEO. Following the scandal, Toshiba Corp. was removed from a stock index showcasing Japan's best companies. That was the second reshuffle of the index, which picks companies with the best operating income, return on equity and market value.

Toshiba announced in early 2015 that it would stop making televisions in its own factories. From 2015 onward, Toshiba televisions will be made by Compal for the U.S., or by Vestel and other manufacturers for the European market. In September 2015, Toshiba shares fell to their lowest point in two and a half years. The firm said in a statement that its net losses for the quarterly period were 12.3 billion yen ($102m; £66m). The company noted poor performances in its televisions, home appliances and personal computer businesses. In October 2015, Toshiba sold the image sensor business to Sony. In December 2015, Muromachi said the episode had wiped about $8 billion off Toshiba's market value. He forecast a record 550 billion yen (about US$4.6 billion) annual loss and warned the company would have to overhaul its TV and computer businesses. Toshiba would not be raising funds for two years, he said. The next week, a company spokesperson announced Toshiba would seek 300 billion yen ($2.5 billion) in 2016, taking the company's indebtedness to more than 1 trillion yen (about $8.3 billion).

In January 2016, Toshiba's security division unveiled a new bundle of services for schools that use its surveillance equipment. The program, which is intended for both K-12 and higher education, includes education discounts, alerts, and post-warranty support, among other features, on its IP-based security gear. In March 2016, Toshiba was preparing to start construction on a cutting-edge new semiconductor plant in Japan that would mass-produce chips based on the ultra-dense flash variant. Toshiba expected to spend approximately 360 billion yen, or $3.2 billion, on the project through May 2019. In April 2016, Toshiba recalled 100,000 faulty laptop lithium-ion batteries, which were made by Panasonic, that can overheat, posing burn and fire hazards to consumers, according to the U.S. Consumer Product Safety Commission. Toshiba first announced the recall in January and said it was recalling the batteries in certain Toshiba Notebook computers sold since June 2011.

In May 2016, it was announced that Satoshi Tsunakawa, the former head of Toshiba's medical equipment division, was named CEO. This appointment came after the accounting scandal that occurred. In September 2016, Toshiba announced the first wireless power receiver IC using the Qi 1.2.2 specification, developed in association with the Wireless Power Consortium. In December 2016, Toshiba Medical Systems Corporation was acquired by Canon. A Chinese electrical appliance corporation Midea Group bought a controlling 80.1% stake in the Toshiba Home Appliances Group.

=== 2017 US nuclear construction liabilities ===
In late December 2016, the management of Toshiba requested an "urgent press briefing" to announce that the newly-found losses in the Westinghouse subsidiary from Vogtle Electric Generating Plant nuclear plant construction would lead to a write-down of several billion dollars, bankrupting Westinghouse and threatening to bankrupt Toshiba. The exact amount of the liabilities was unavailable. In January 2017, a person with direct knowledge of the matter reported that the company plans on making its memory chip division a separate business, to save Toshiba from bankruptcy.

In February 2017, Toshiba revealed unaudited details of a 390 billion yen ($3.4 billion) corporate wide loss, mainly arising from its majority owned US based Westinghouse nuclear construction subsidiary which was written down by 712 billion yen ($6.3 billion). On 14 February 2017, Toshiba delayed filing financial results, and chairman Shigenori Shiga, formerly chairman of Westinghouse, resigned. Construction delays, regulatory changes and cost overruns at Westinghouse-built nuclear facilities Vogtle units 3 and 4 in Waynesboro, Georgia and VC Summer units 2 and 3 in South Carolina, were cited as the main causes of the dramatic fall in Toshiba's financial performance and collapse in the share price. Fixed priced construction contracts negotiated by Westinghouse with Georgia Power left Toshiba with uncharted liabilities that resulted in the sale of key Toshiba operating subsidiaries to secure the company's future.

Westinghouse filed for Chapter 11 bankruptcy protection on 29 March 2017. Toshiba was estimated to have a 9 billion dollar annual net loss. On 11 April 2017, Toshiba filed unaudited quarterly results. Auditors PricewaterhouseCoopers had not signed off on the accounts because of uncertainties at Westinghouse. Toshiba stated that "substantial doubt about the company's ability to continue as a going concern exists". On 25 April 2017, Toshiba announced its decision to replace its auditor after less than a year. Earlier in April, the company filed twice-delayed business results without an endorsement from auditor PricewaterhouseCoopers (PwC).

On 20 September 2017, Toshiba's board approved a deal to sell its memory chip business to a group led by Bain Capital for US$18 billion, with financial backing by companies such as Apple, Dell Technologies, Hoya Corporation, Kingston Technology, Seagate Technology, and SK Hynix. The newly independent company was named Toshiba Memory Corporation, and then renamed Kioxia. On 15 November 2017, Hisense reached a deal to acquire 95% of Toshiba Visual Solutions (television sets) for US$113.6 million. Later that month, the company announced that it would pull out of its long-standing sponsorships of the Japanese television programs Sazae-san, Nichiyō Gekijo, and the video screens on top of One Times Square in New York City. The company cited that the value of these placements were reduced by its exit from consumer-oriented lines of business. On 6 April 2018, Toshiba announced the completion of the sale of Westinghouse's holding company to Brookfield Business Partners and some partners for $4.6 billion.

=== Present and future ===
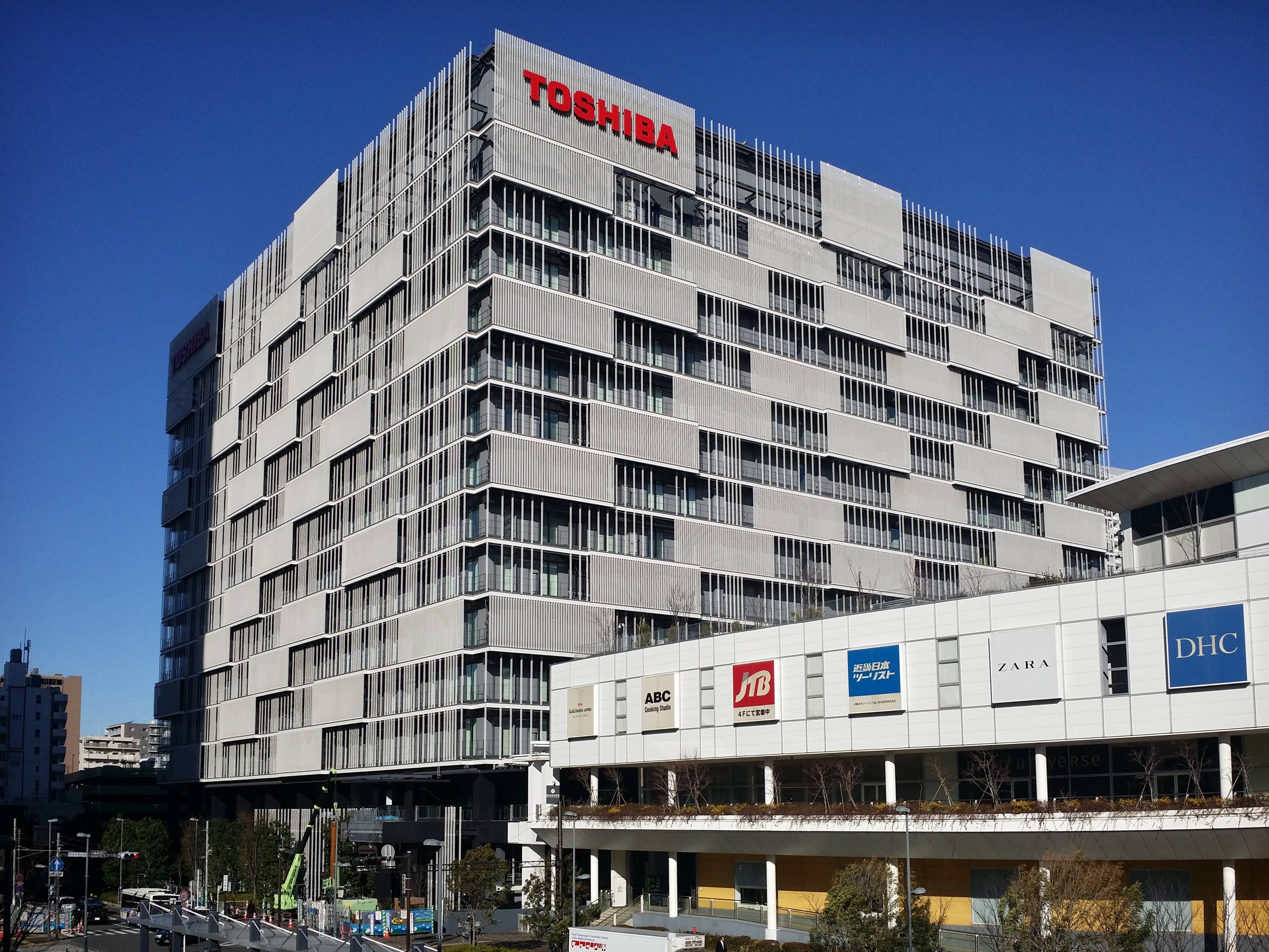
Toshiba Science Museum in Kawasaki, Japan

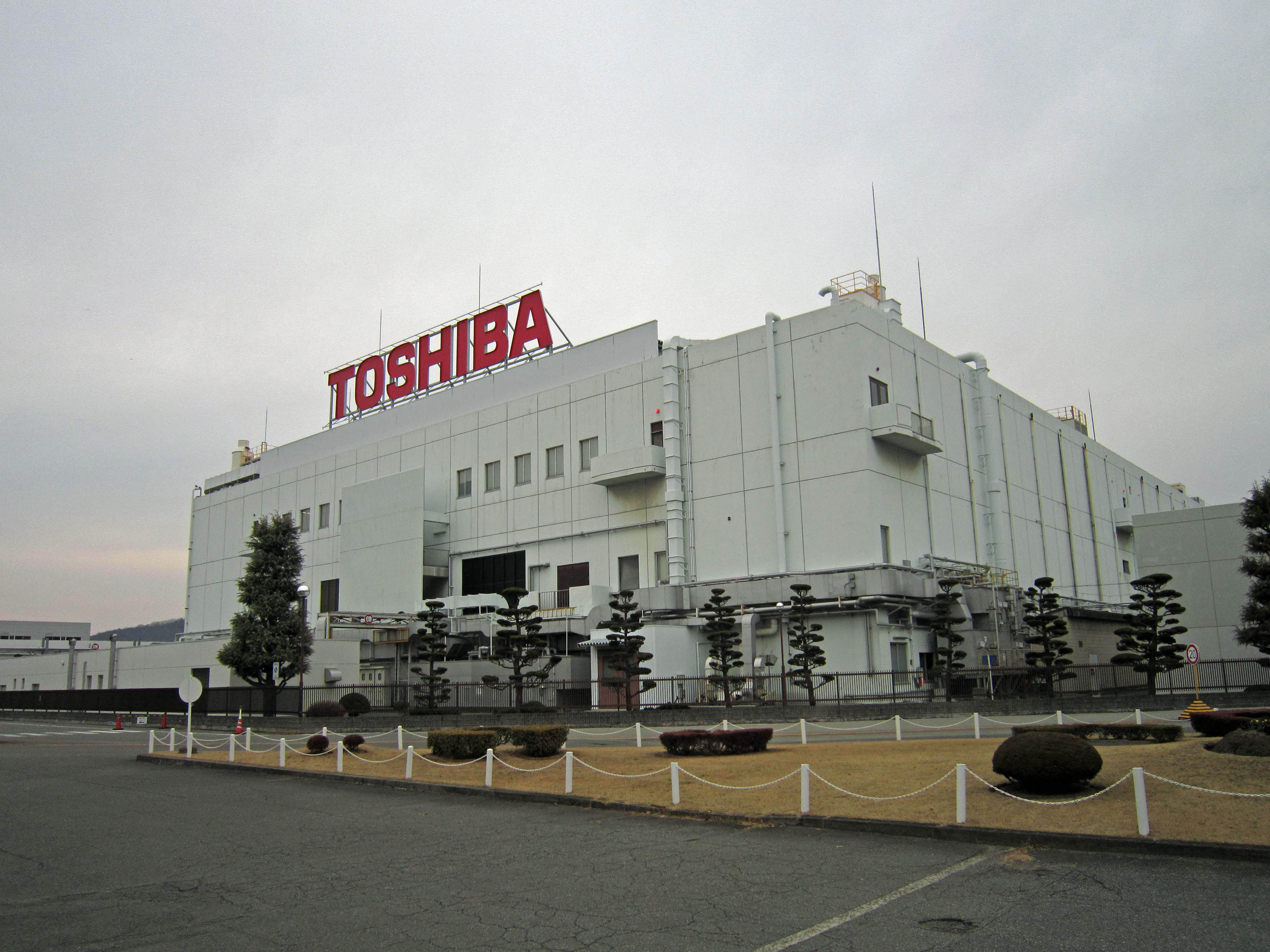
Toshiba factory in Taishi, Japan

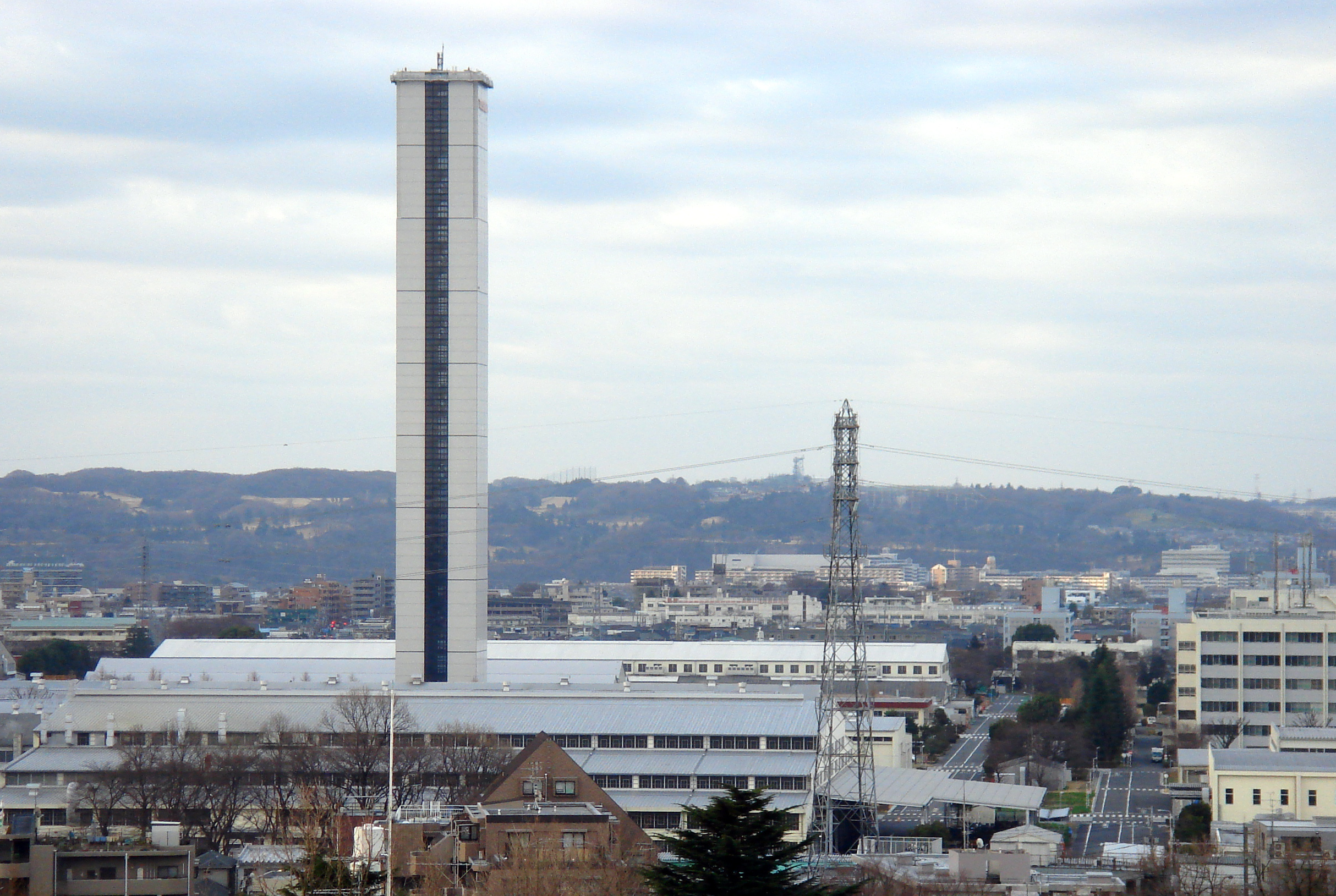
Elevator Research Tower of Toshiba Fuchu Complex. The largest factory complex in the Toshiba organization

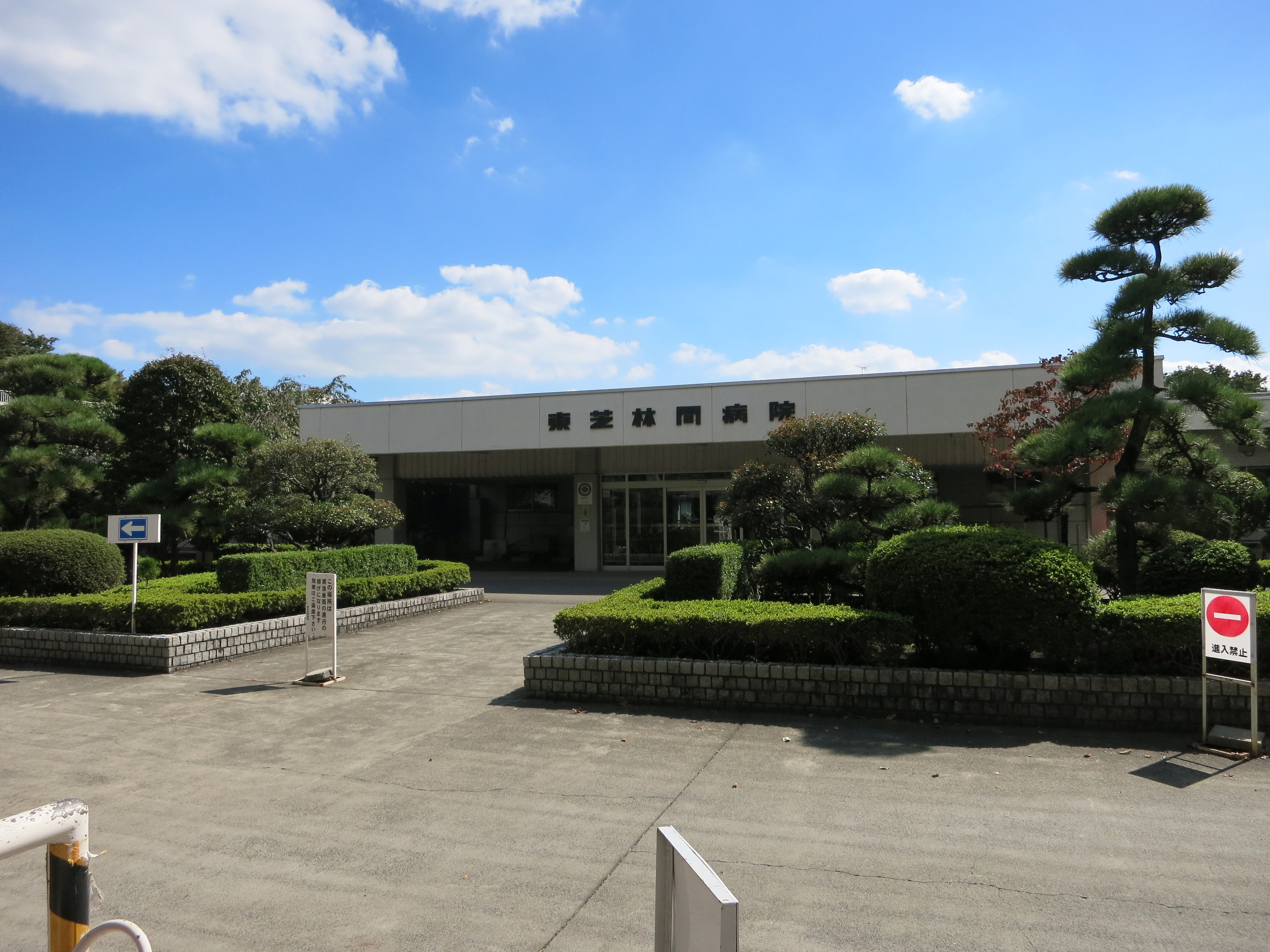
Toshiba Rinkan Hospital, Kanagawa, Japan

In June 2018, Toshiba sold 80.1% of its Client Solutions (personal computers) business unit to Sharp for $36m, with an option allowing Sharp to buy the remaining 19.9% share. Sharp renamed the business to Dynabook, a brand name Toshiba had used in Japan, and started releasing products under that name. On 30 June 2020, Sharp exercised its option to acquire the remaining 19.9% percent of Dynabook shares from Toshiba. In May 2019, Toshiba announced that it would put non-Japanese investors on its board for the first time in nearly 80 years. In November, the company transferred its logistics service business to SBS Group.

In January 2020, Toshiba unveiled its plan to launch quantum cryptography services by September the same year. It also announced a number of other technologies waiting for commercialization, including an affordable solid-state Lidar based on silicon photomultiplier, high-capacity hydrogen fuel cells, and a proprietary computer algorithm named Simulated Bifurcation Algorithm that mimics quantum computing, of which it plans to sell access to other parties such as financial institutions, social networking services, etc. The company claims the algorithm running on a desktop PC at room temperature environment is capable of surpassing the performance of similar algorithms running on existing supercomputers, even that of laser-based quantum computer when a specialized setting is given. It has been added to quantum computing services offered by major cloud platforms including Microsoft Azure. In October 2020, Toshiba made a decision to pull out of the system LSI business citing mounted losses while reportedly mulling on the sale of its semiconductor fabs as well. In April 2021, CVC Capital Partners made a takeover offer.

On 12 November 2021, Toshiba announced that it would split into three separate companies. Two of the companies will respectively focus on infrastructure and electronic devices; the third, which will retain the Toshiba name, would manage the 40.6% stake in Kioxia and all other remaining assets. The company expected to complete the plan by March 2024 but the plan was challenged by stockholders, and at an extraordinary general meeting on 24 March 2022, they rejected the plan. They also rejected an alternative plan put forward by a large institutional investor that would have had the company search for buyers among private equity firms. Toshiba announced in February 2022 that it plans to split into two companies instead after the original proposal proved unpopular with shareholders.

In March 2023, the company announced it had accepted a ¥2 trillion ($15 billion) buyout offer from a consortium of 20 companies, which was led by Japan Industrial Partners (JIP), a Tokyo-based private equity firm, and includes Orix, Chubu Electric Power, and Rohm. On September 27, after the public offering was completed in the middle of that month, it was reported that it would be transferred to a new parent company, TBJH. On 22 December 2023, it was announced that JIP's purchase of the company had been completed, two days after being delisted. This move brought the company back to Japan after it had been run by overseas activist investors.

== Operations ==
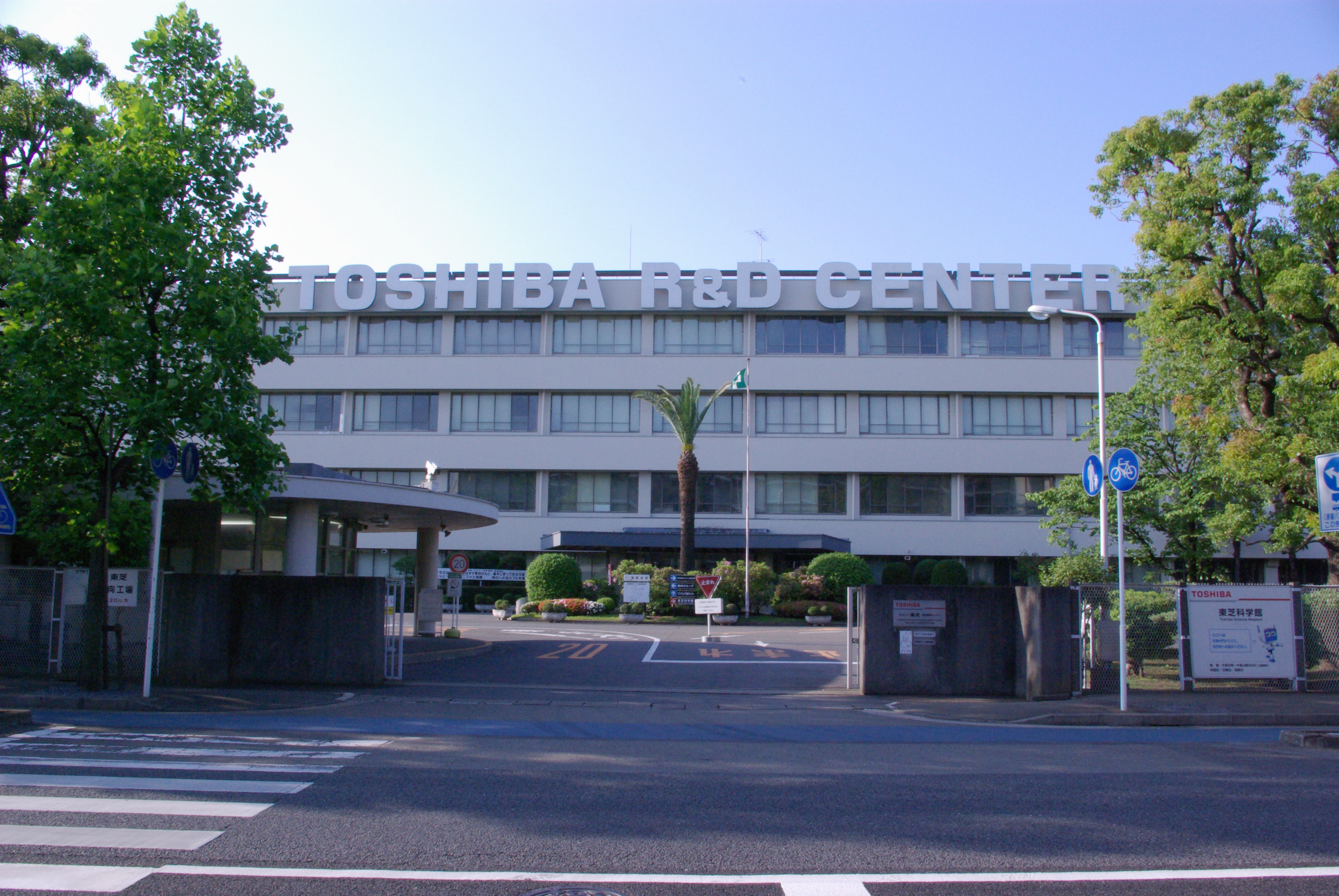
The Toshiba research and development facility in Kawasaki, Kanagawa, Japan

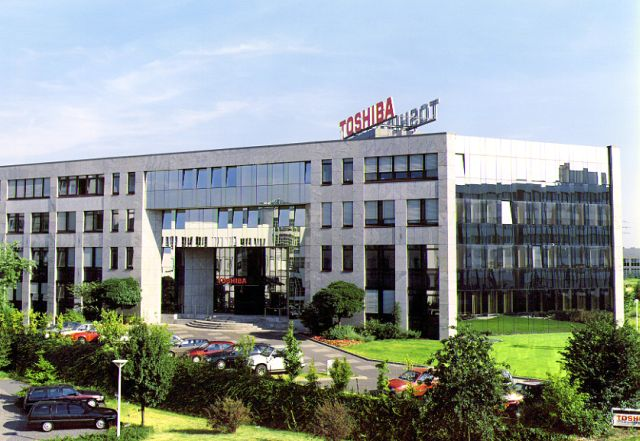
Toshiba Europe offices in Neuss, Germany

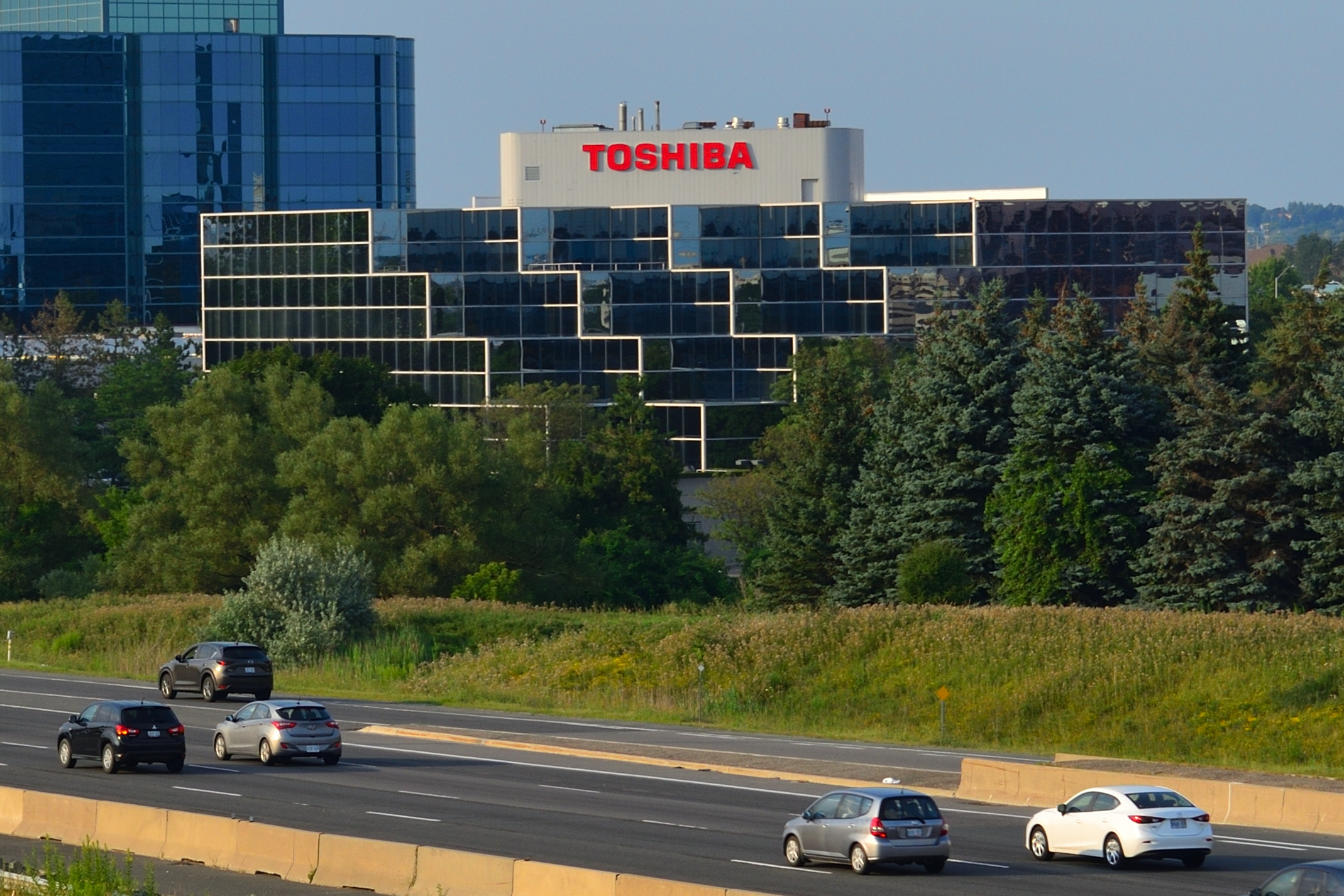
Toshiba Canada offices

As of 2012, Toshiba had 39 R&D facilities worldwide, which employed around 4,180 people, and was organized into four main business groupings: the Digital Products Group, the Electronic Devices Group, the Home Appliances Group and the Social Infrastructure Group. In the year ended 31 March 2012, Toshiba had total revenues of ¥6,100.3 billion, of which 25.2 percent was generated by the Digital Products Group, 24.5 percent by the Electronic Devices Group, 8.7 percent by the Home Appliances Group, 36.6 percent by the Social Infrastructure Group and 5 percent by other activities. In the same year, 45 percent of Toshiba's sales were generated in Japan and 55 percent in the rest of the world.

Toshiba invested a total of ¥319.9 billion in R&D in the year ended 31 March 2012, equivalent to 5.2 percent of sales. Toshiba registered a total of 2,483 patents in the United States in 2011, the fifth-largest number of any company (after IBM, Samsung Electronics, Canon and Panasonic). Toshiba had around 141,256 employees as of 31 March 2018.

== Products, services, and standards ==
Toshiba has had a range of products and services, including air conditioners, consumer electronics (including televisions and DVD and Blu-ray players), control systems (including air-traffic control systems, railway systems, security systems and traffic control systems), electronic point of sale equipment, elevators and escalators, home appliances (including refrigerators and washing machines), IT services, lighting, materials and electronic components, medical equipment (including CT and MRI scanners, ultrasound equipment and X-ray equipment), office equipment, business telecommunication equipment personal computers, semiconductors, power systems (including electricity turbines, fuel cells and nuclear reactors) power transmission and distribution systems, and TFT displays.

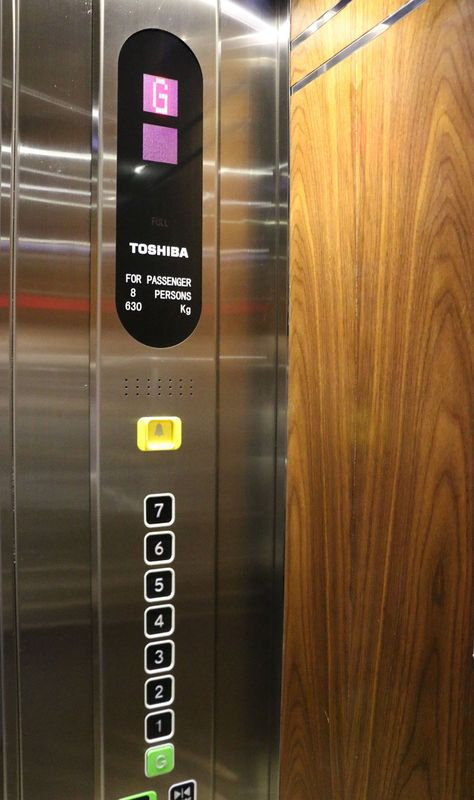
A Toshiba elevator

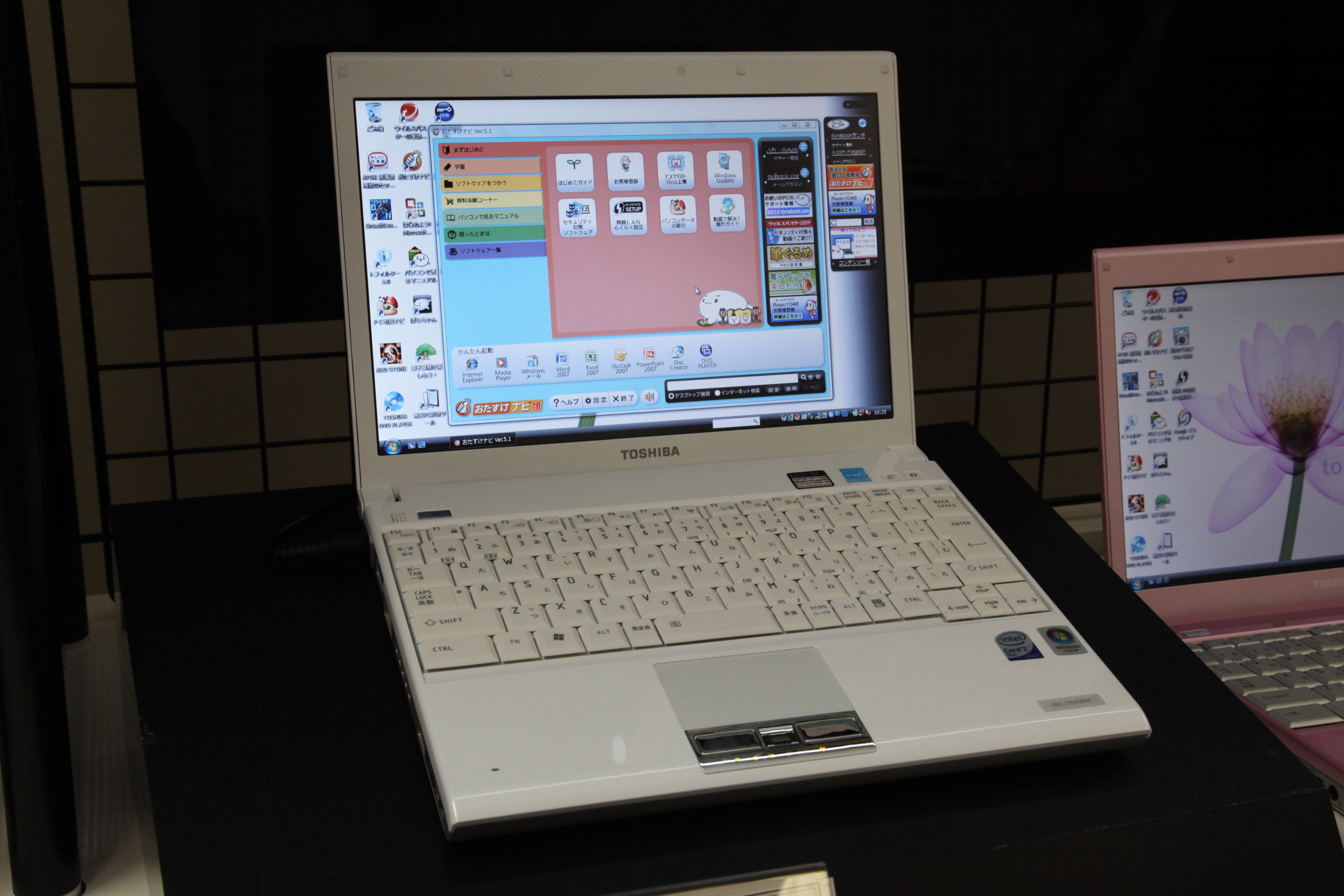
TOSHIBA dynabook NX

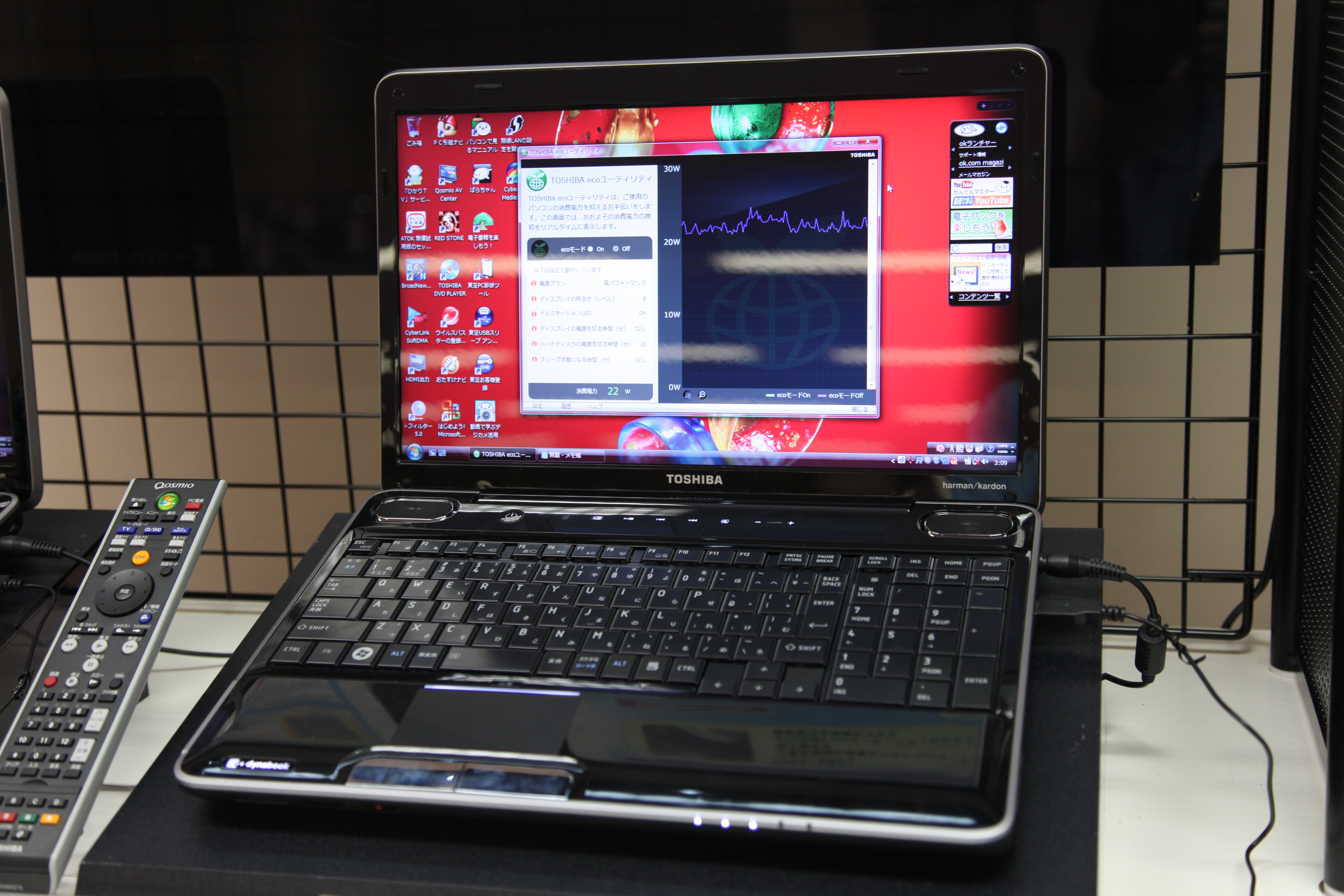
TOSHIBA dynabook TV

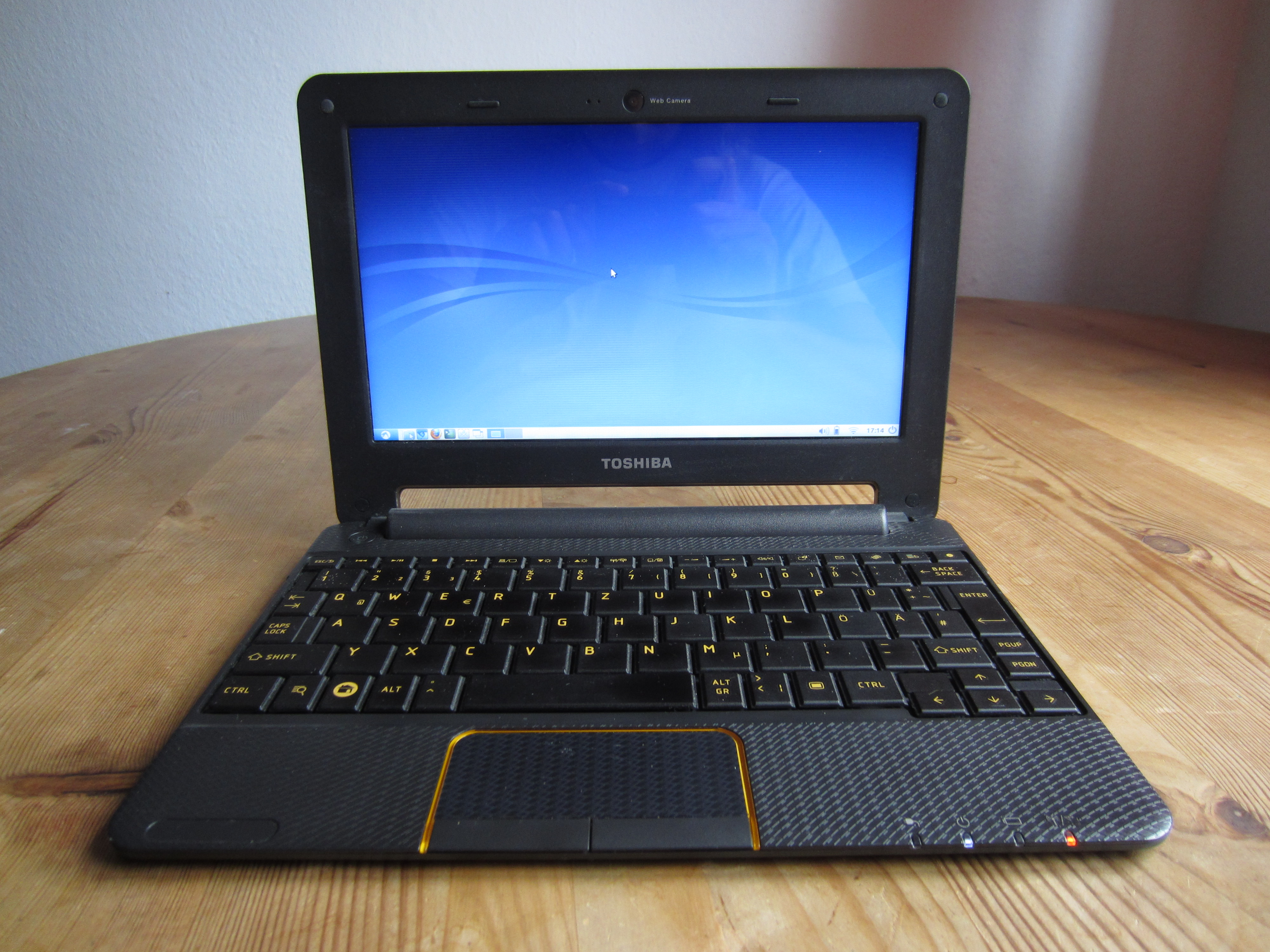
Toshiba-AC100

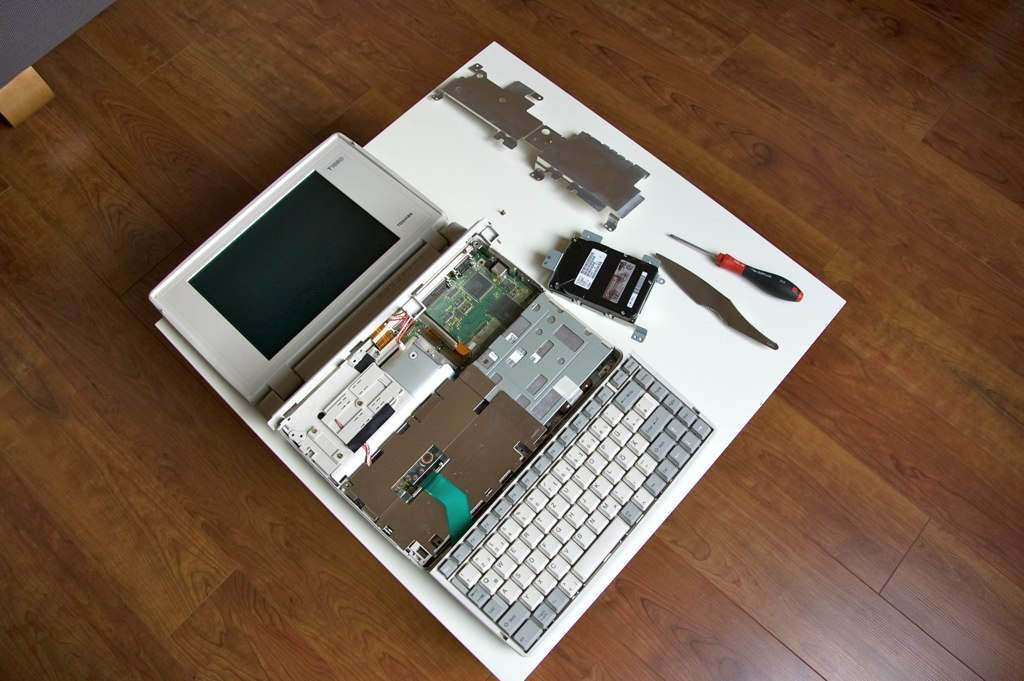
Toshiba T1850 laptop dismantled

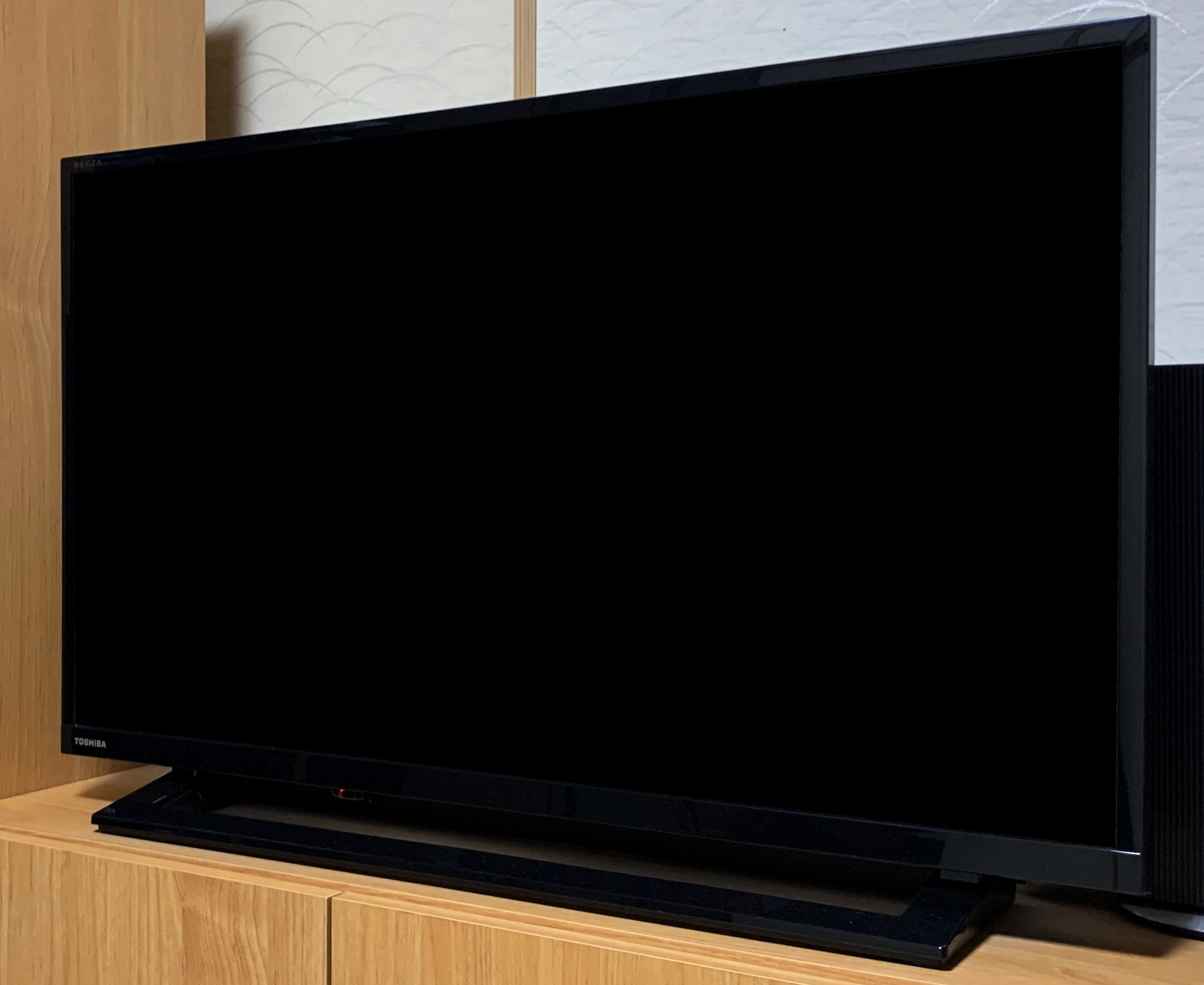
Toshiba Regza television

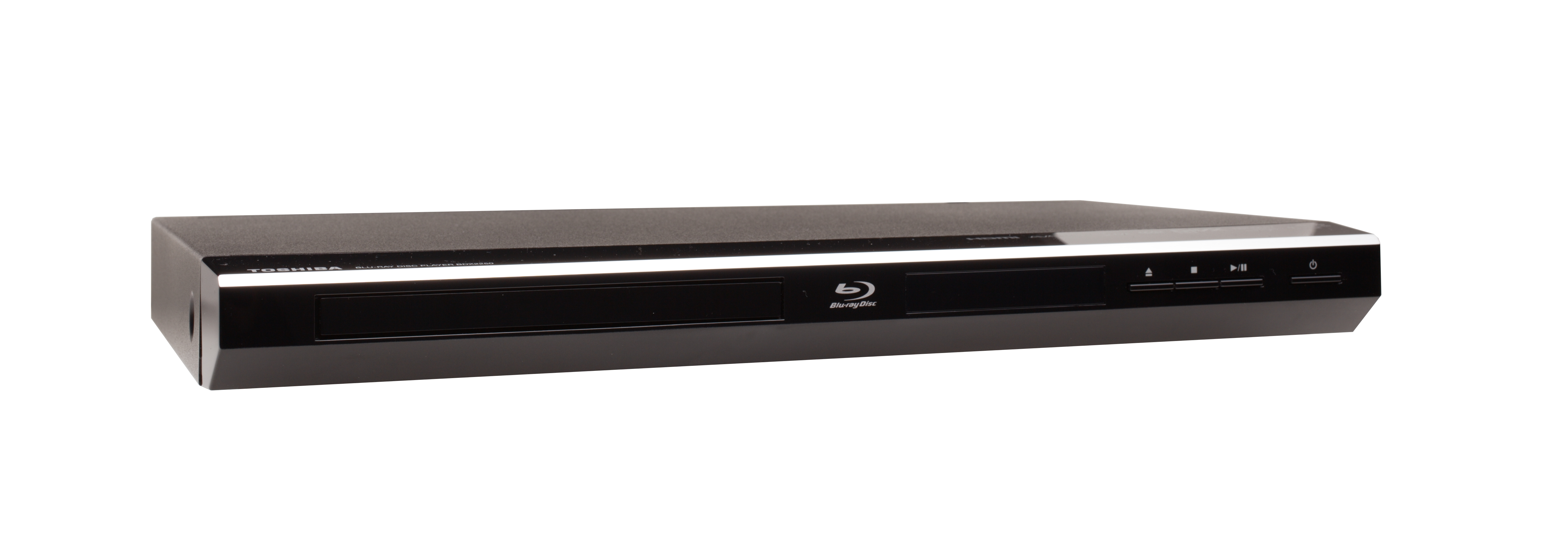
Toshiba Blu-ray disc player

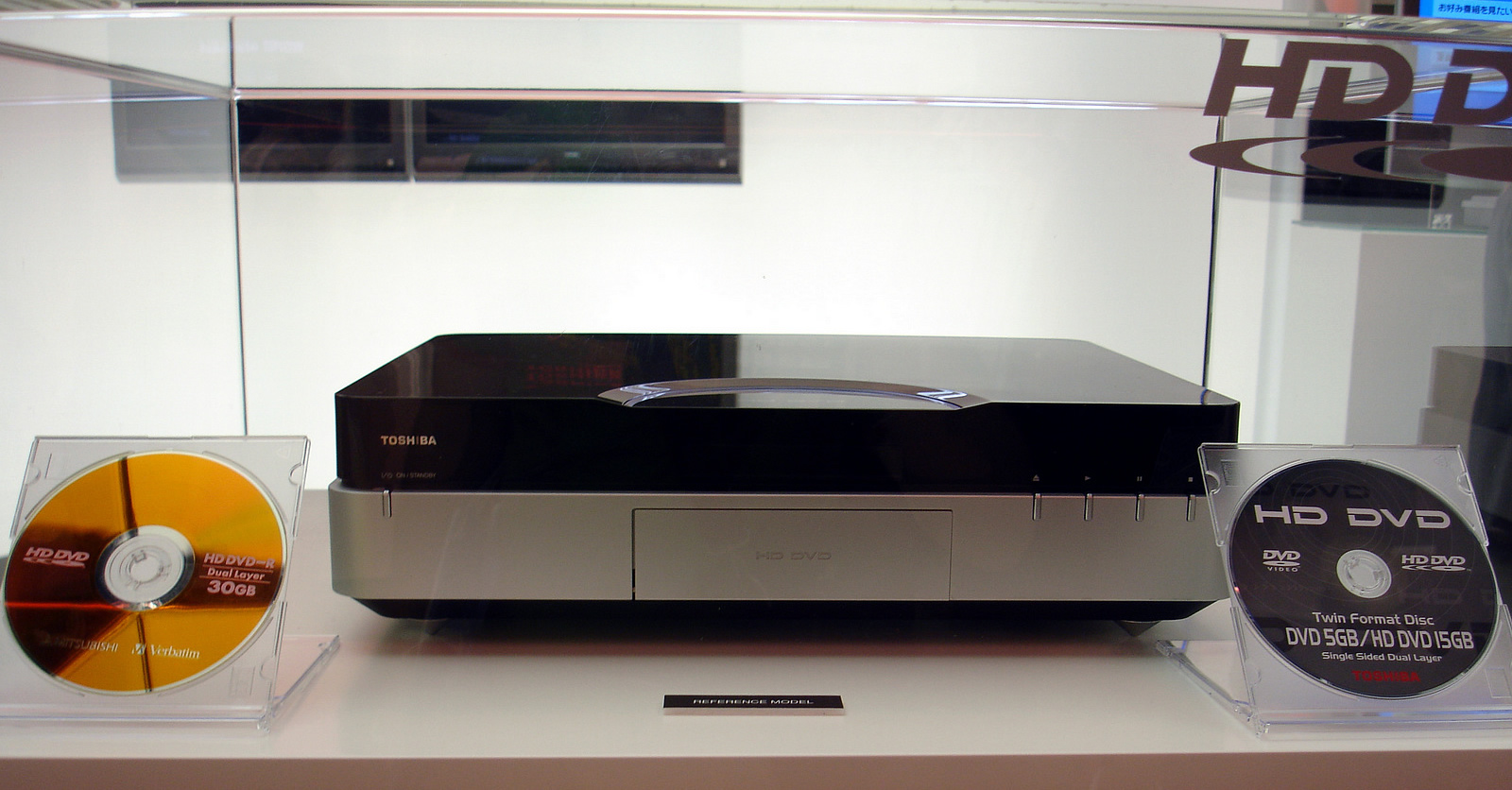
Toshiba HD-DVD player

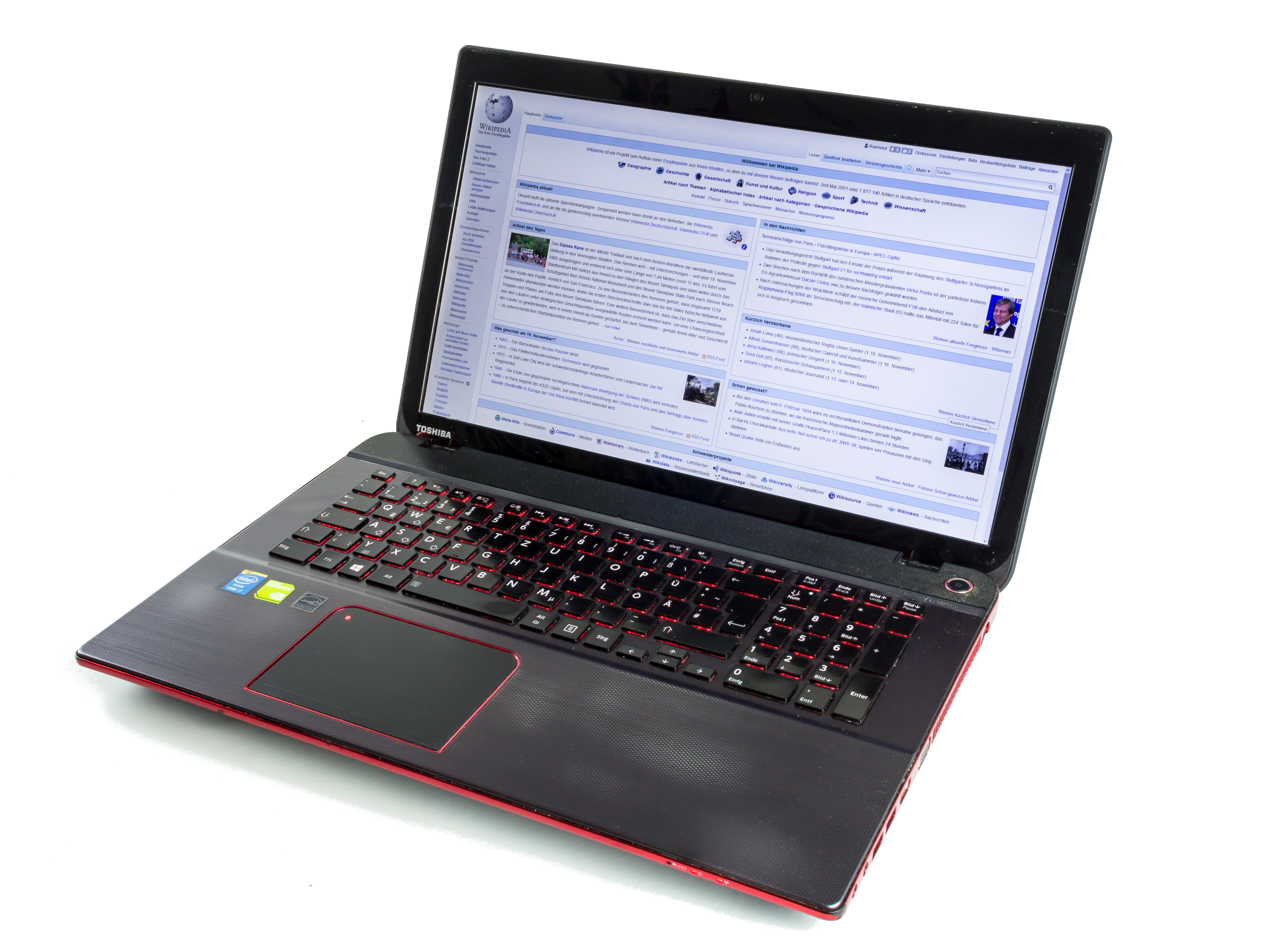
Toshiba Qosmio notebook

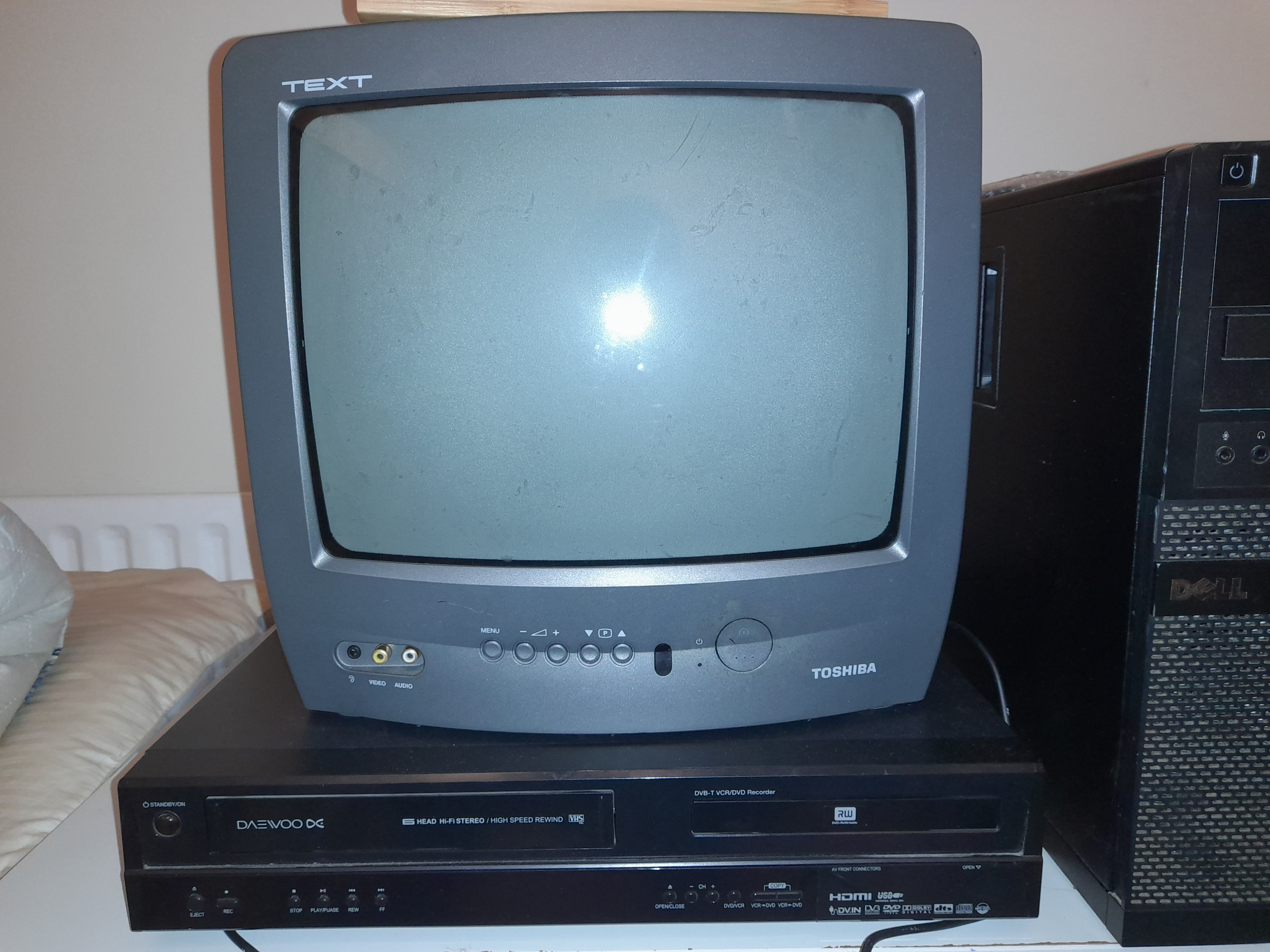
A Toshiba cathode-ray tube (CRT) television.

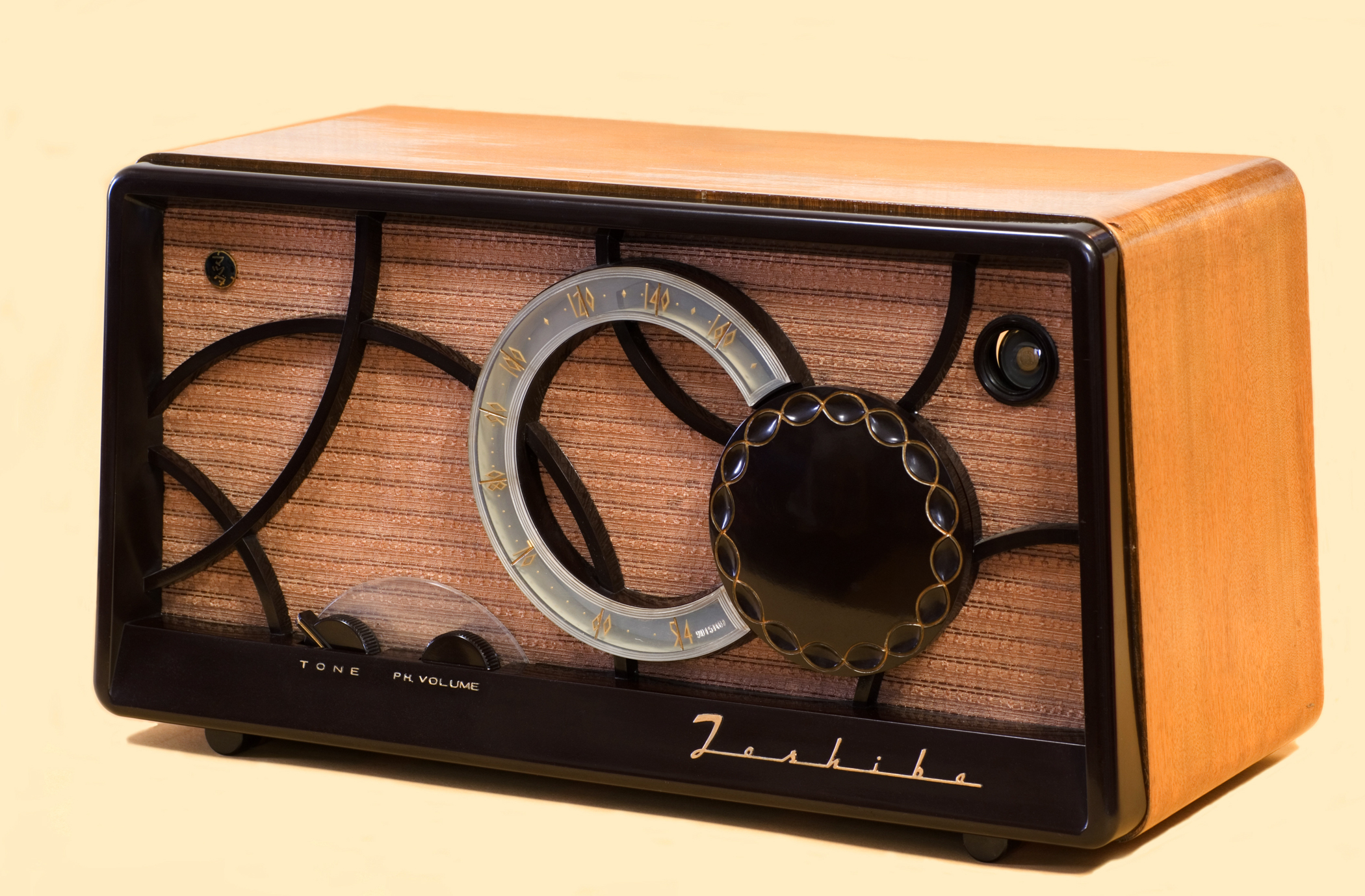
Toshiba Vacuum tube Radio

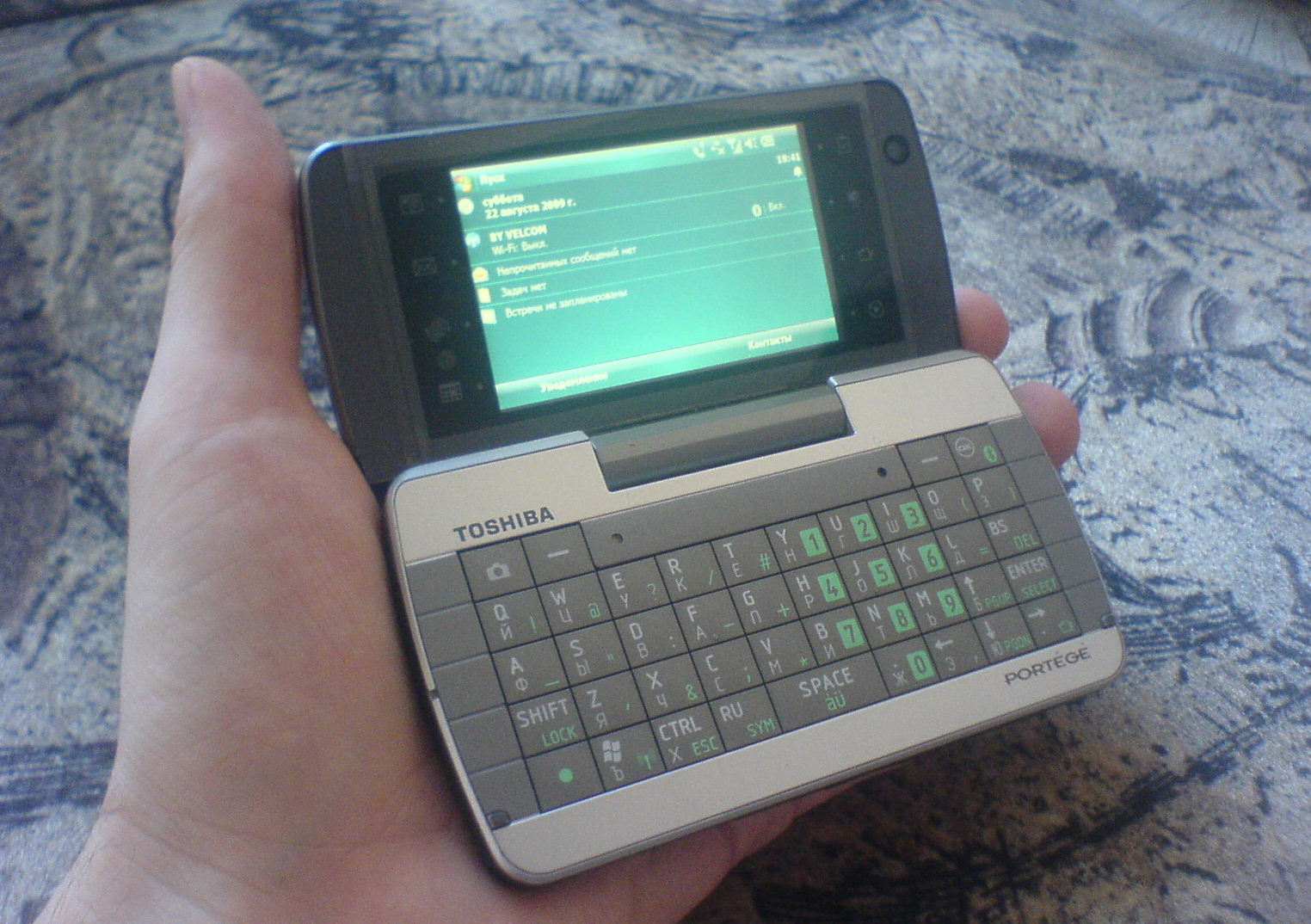
Toshiba Portege G900 smartphone with a Russian interface of Windows Mobile, connected to the Belarusian operator Velcom.

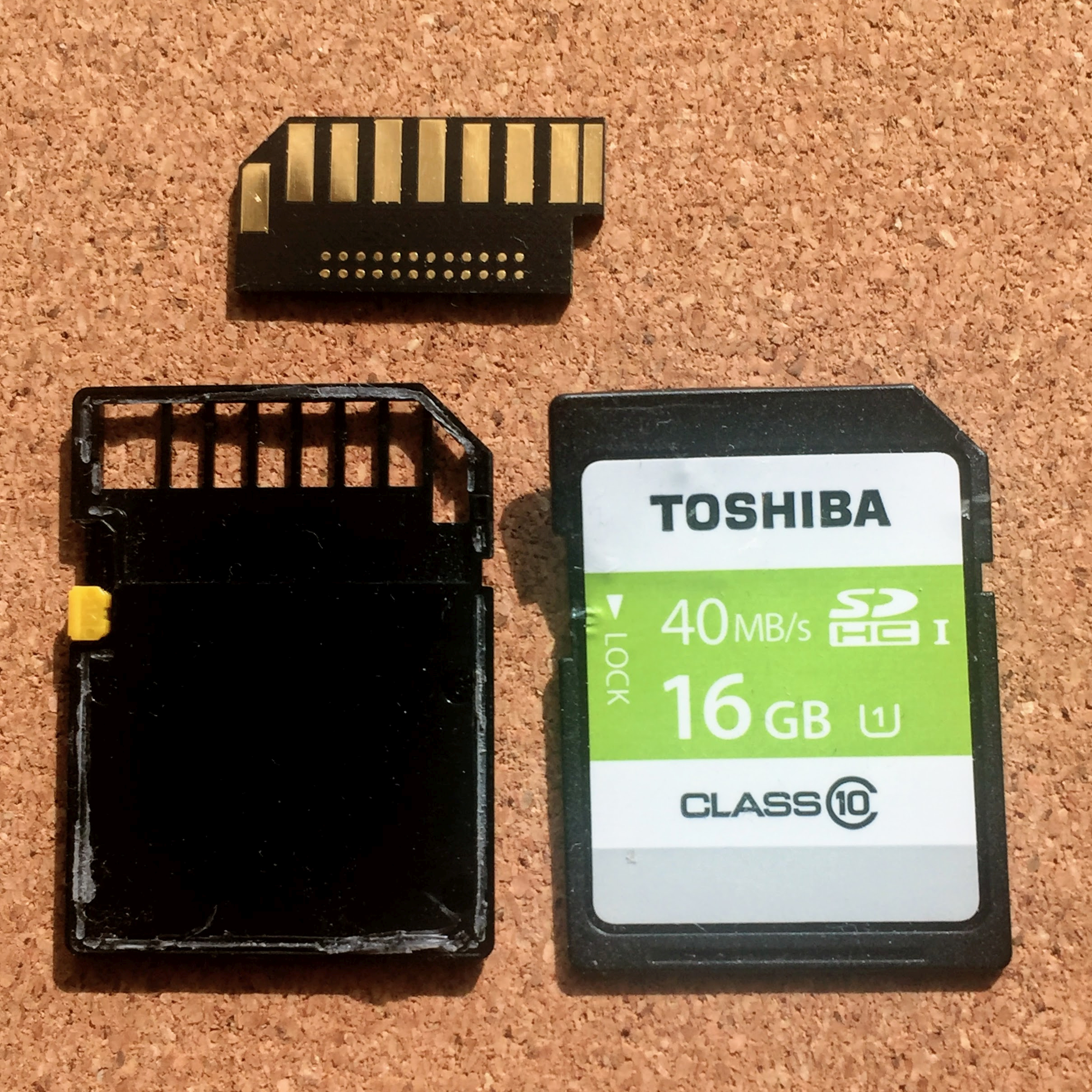
Disassembled SD card "TOSHIBA SD-K16G".

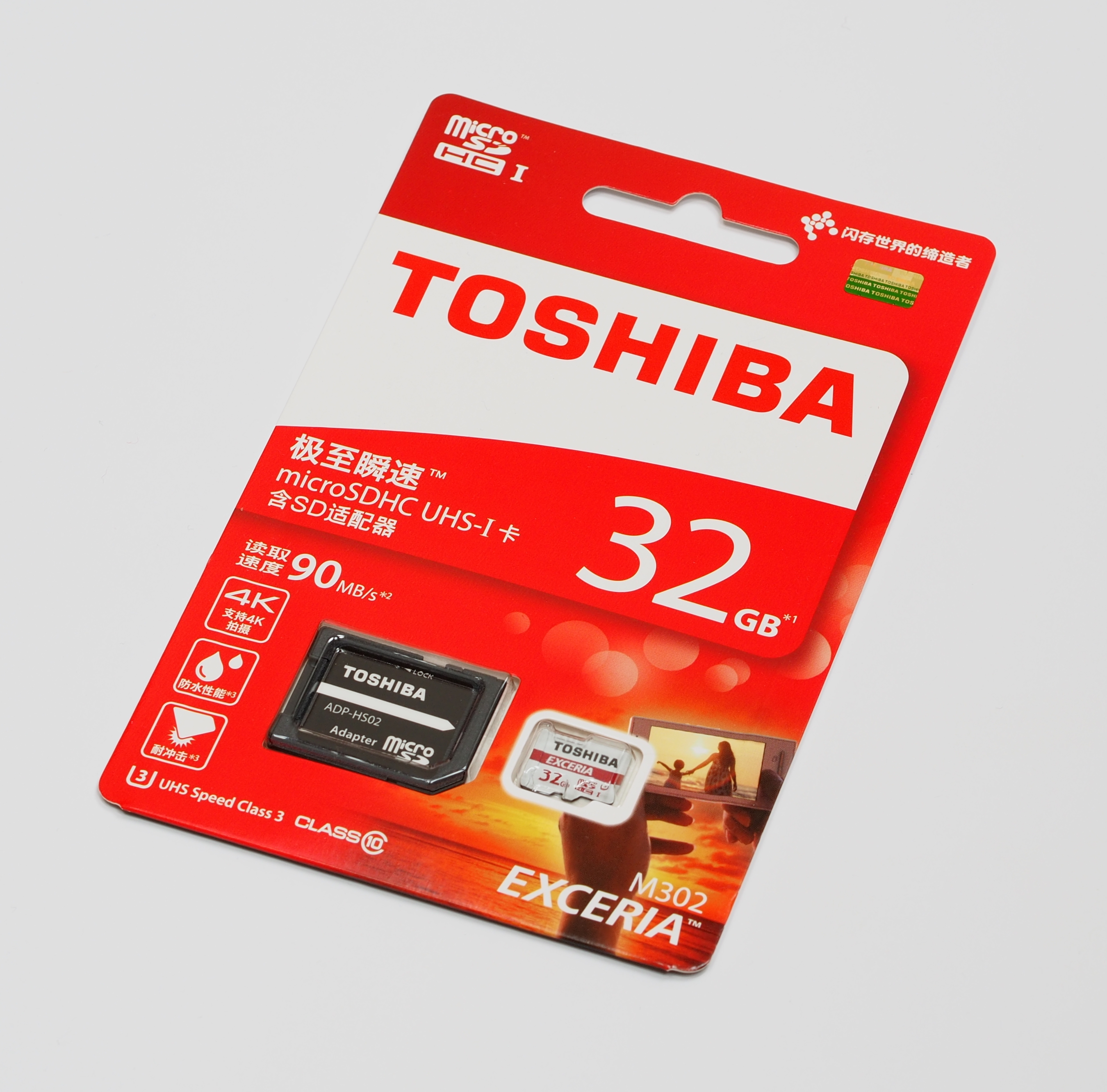
Toshiba microSD card

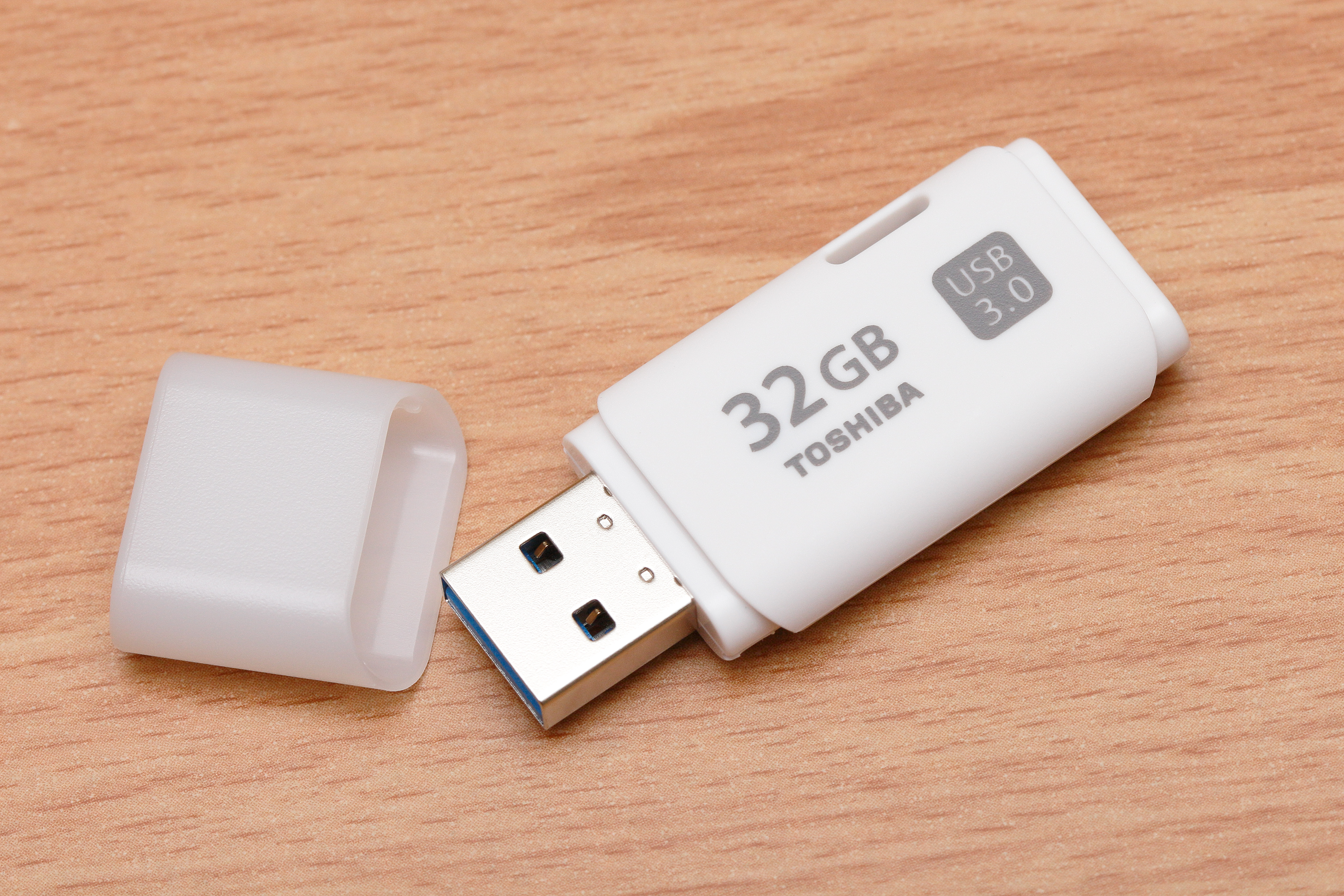
Toshiba USB flash drive

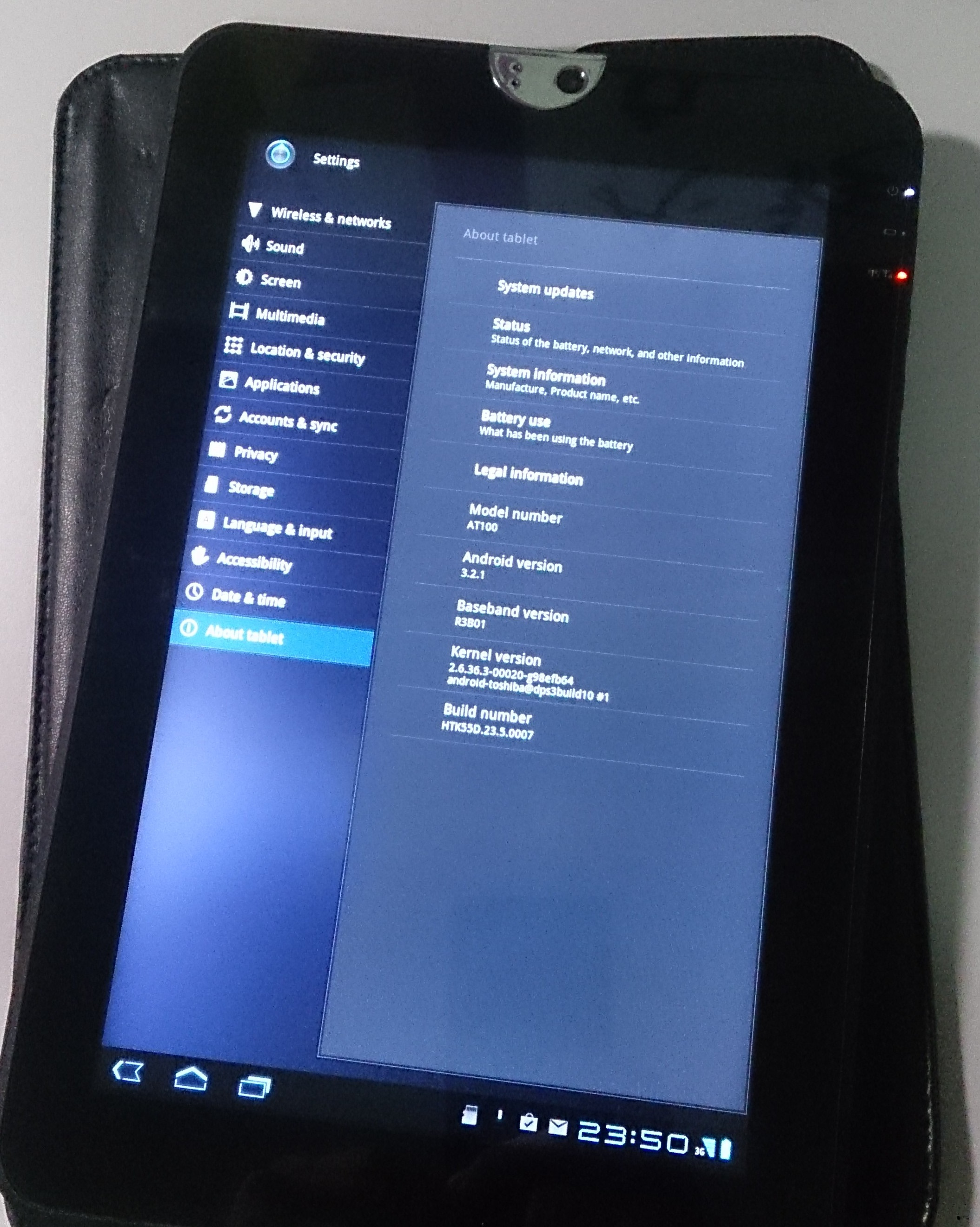
Toshiba Thrive

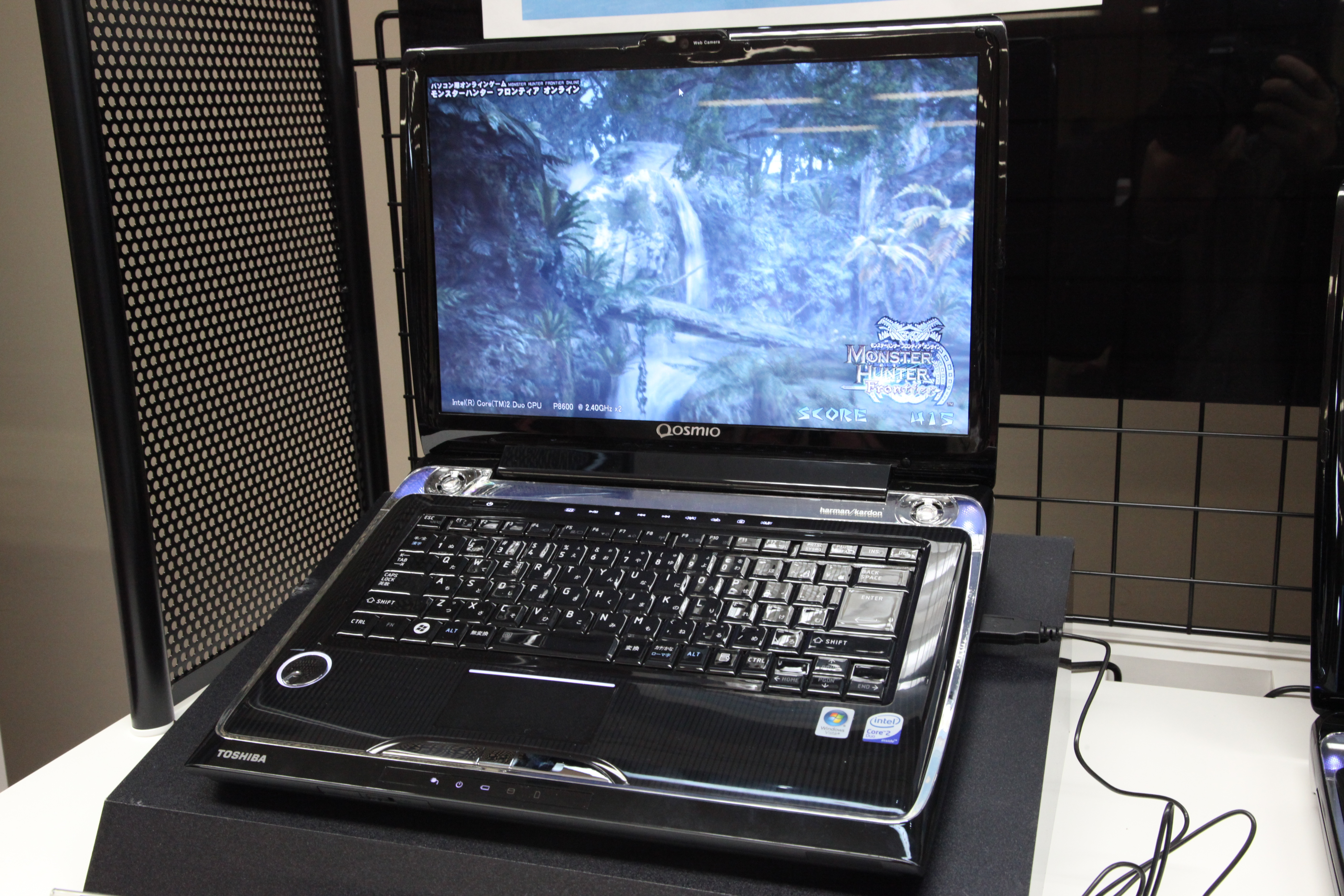
TOSHIBA dynabook Qosmio

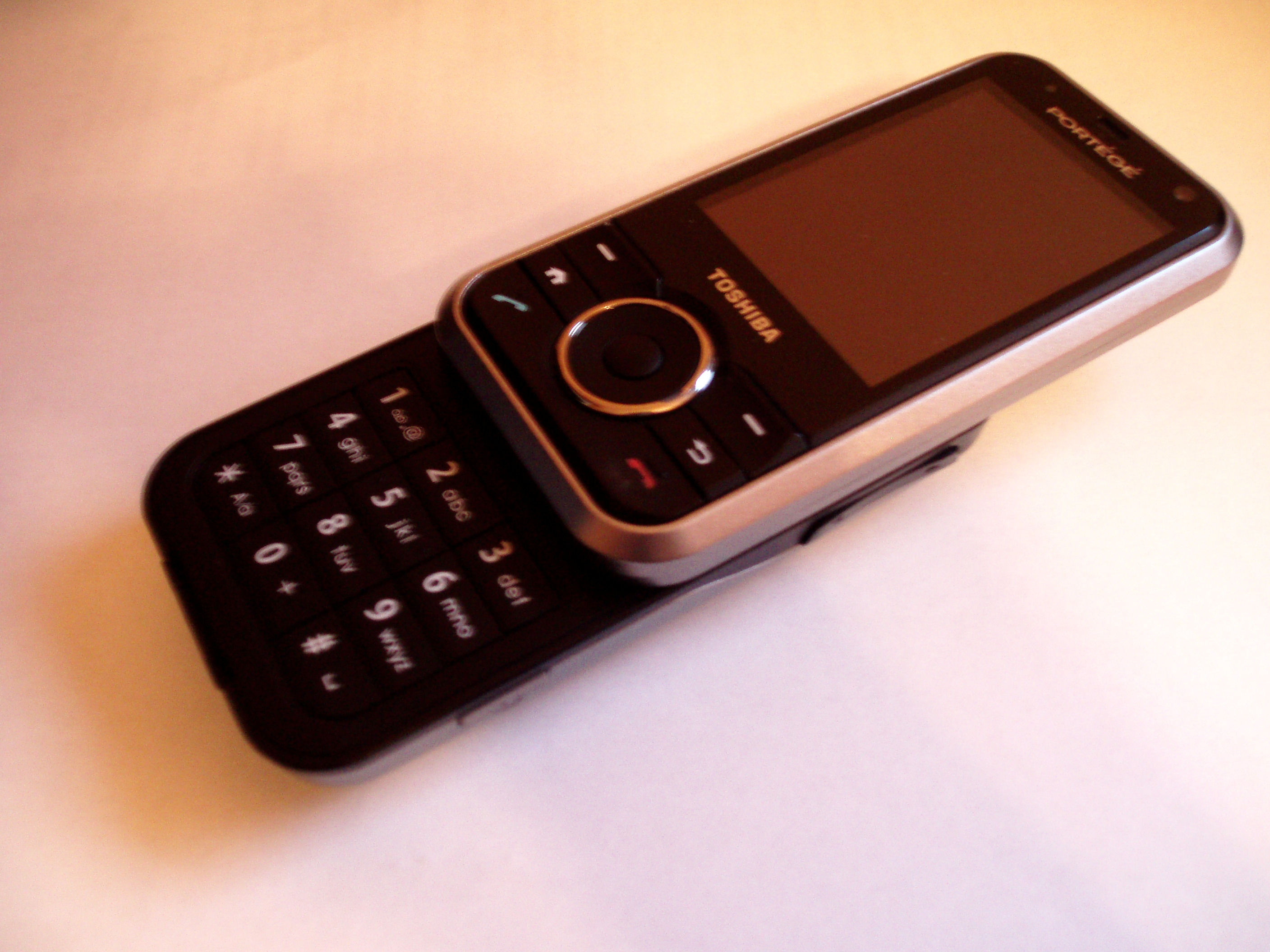
Toshiba G500

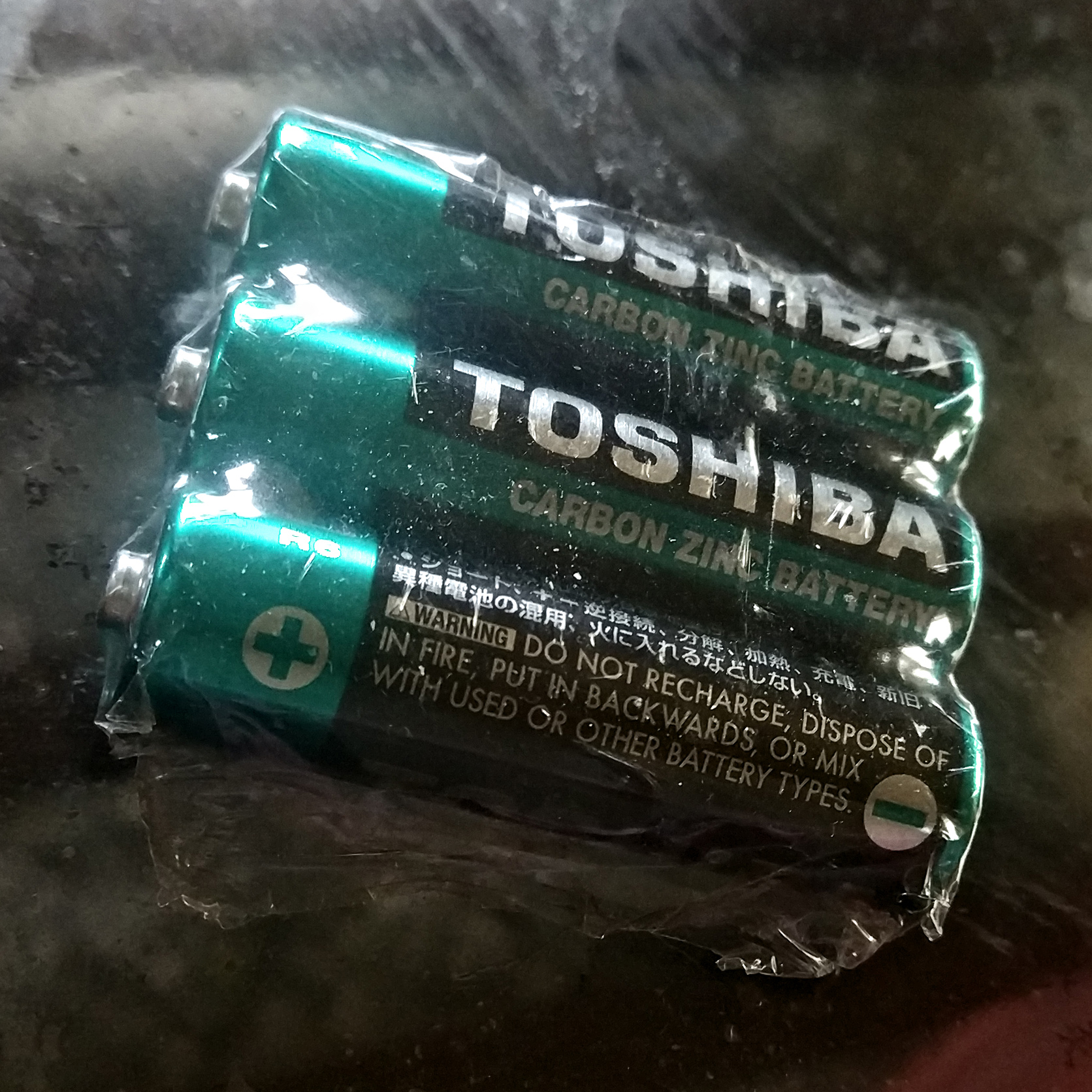
Toshiba zinc battery

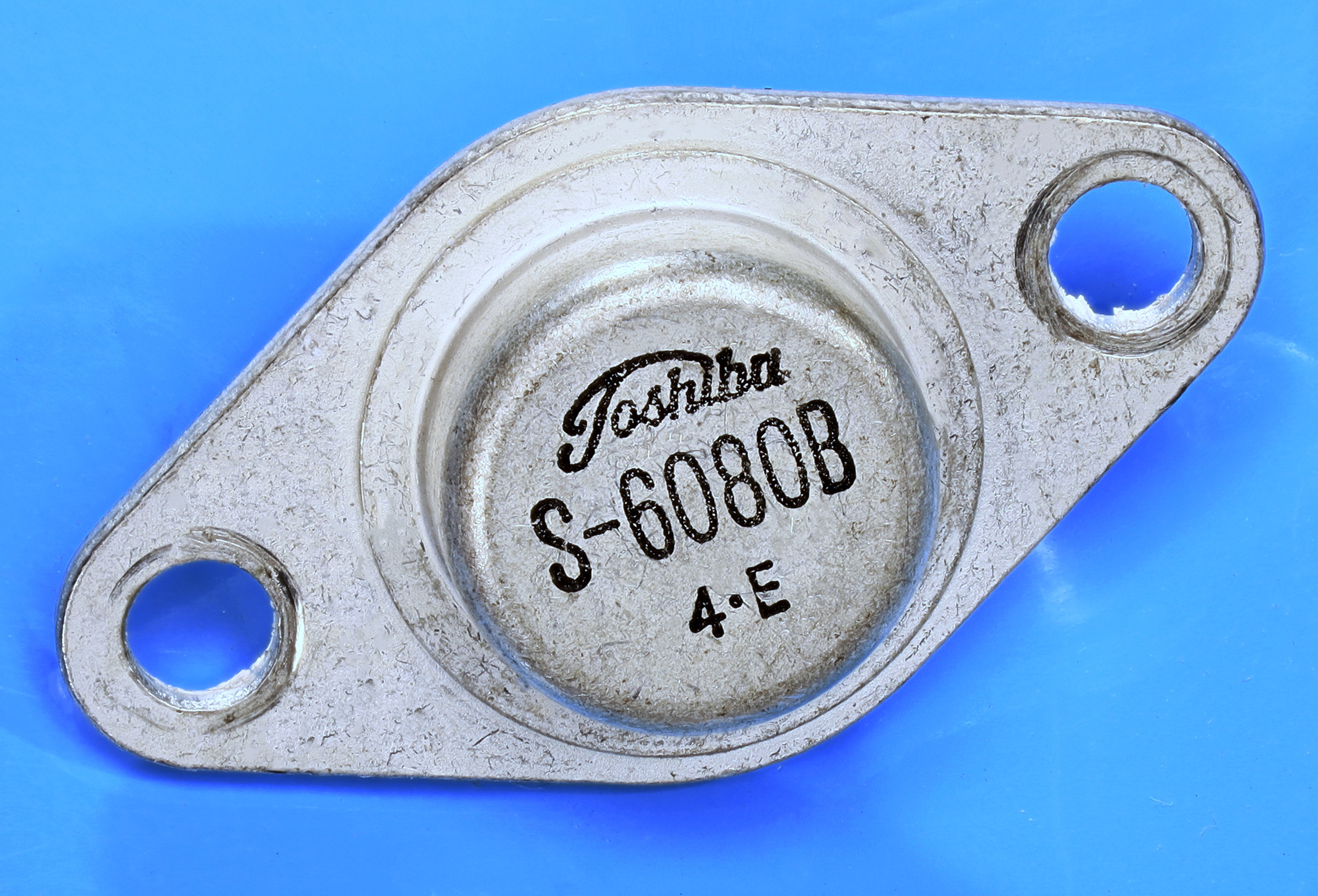
Silicon thyristor

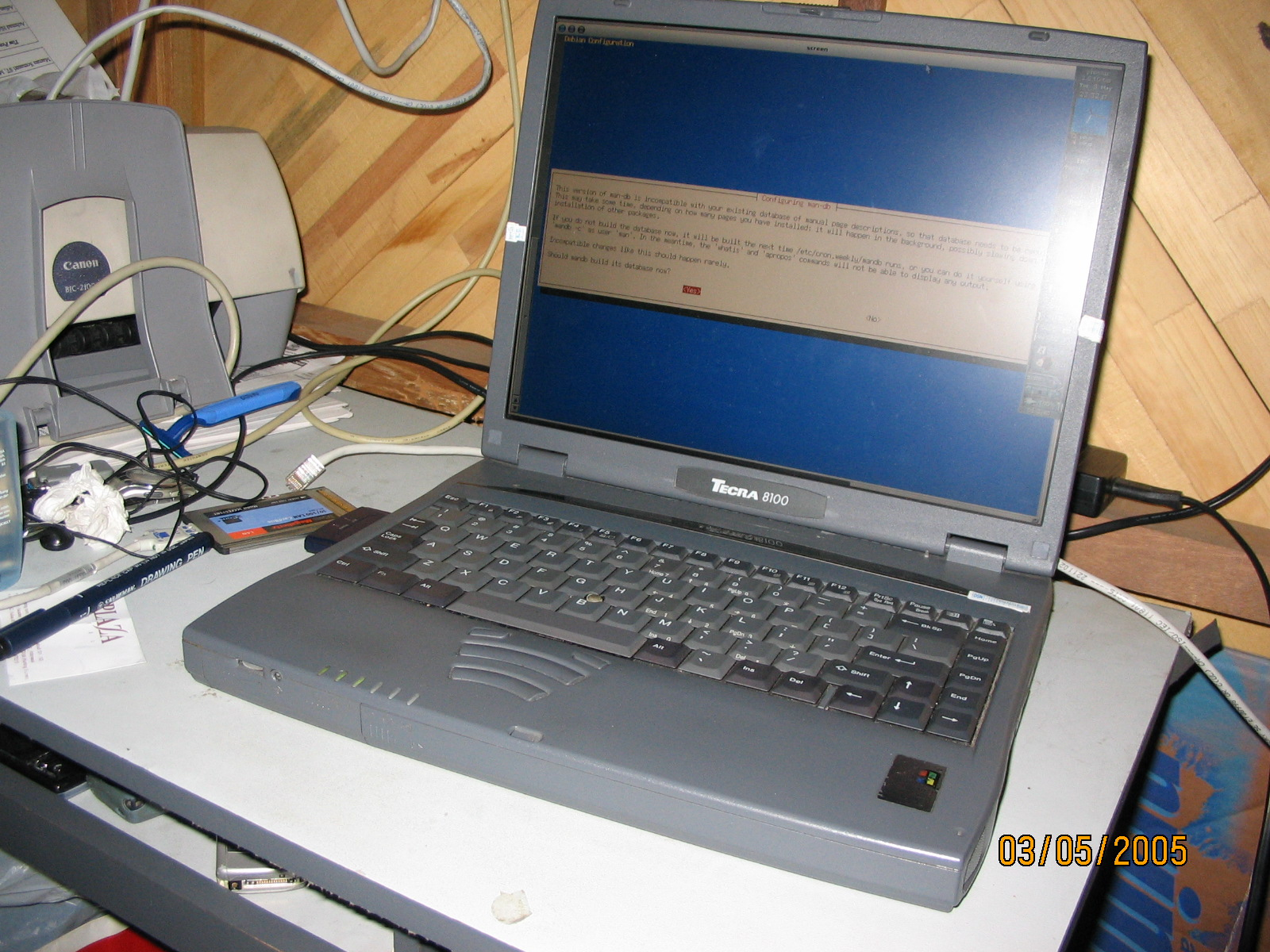
Toshiba Tecra 8100

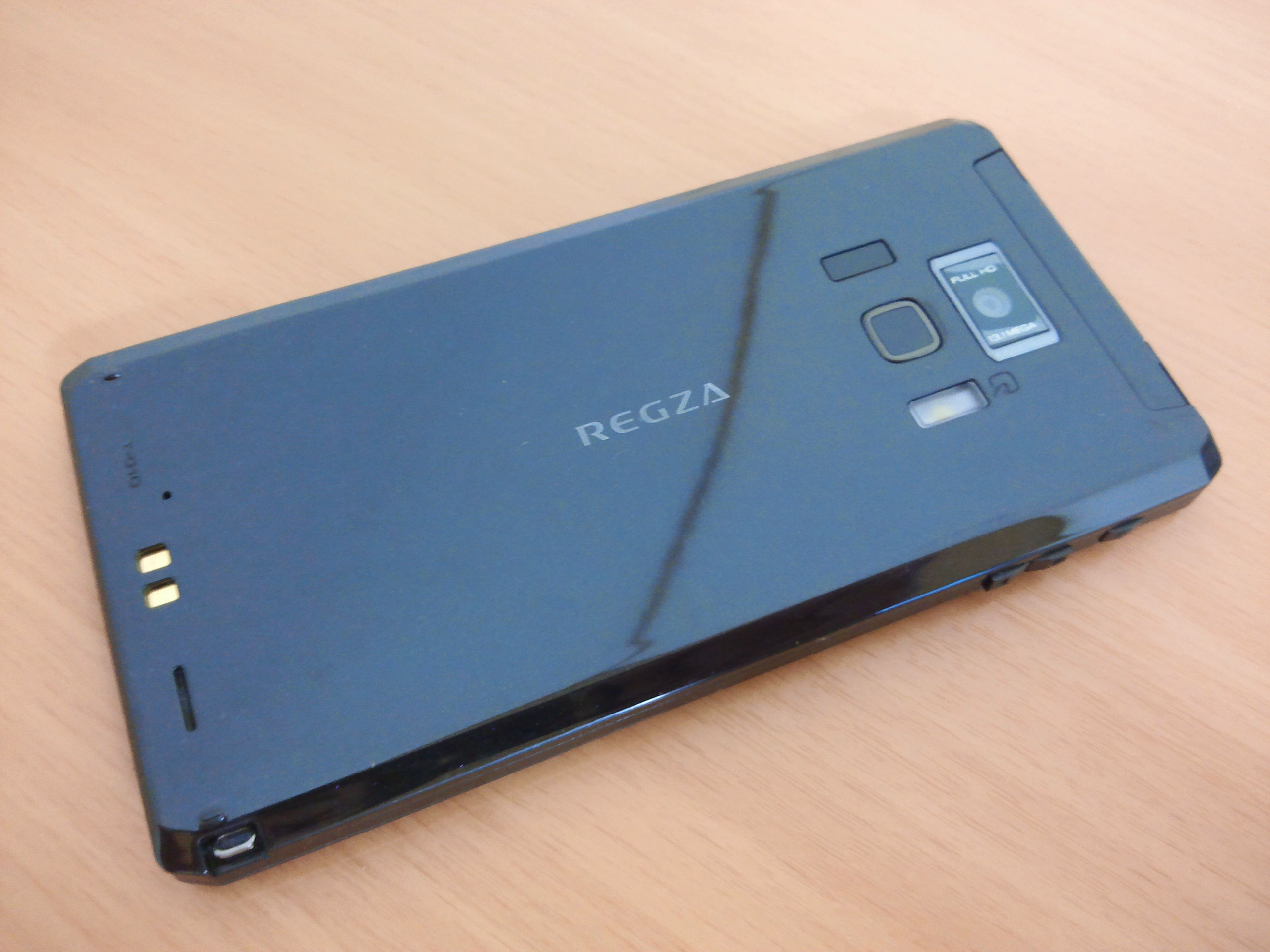
Fujitsu Toshiba Regza smartphone

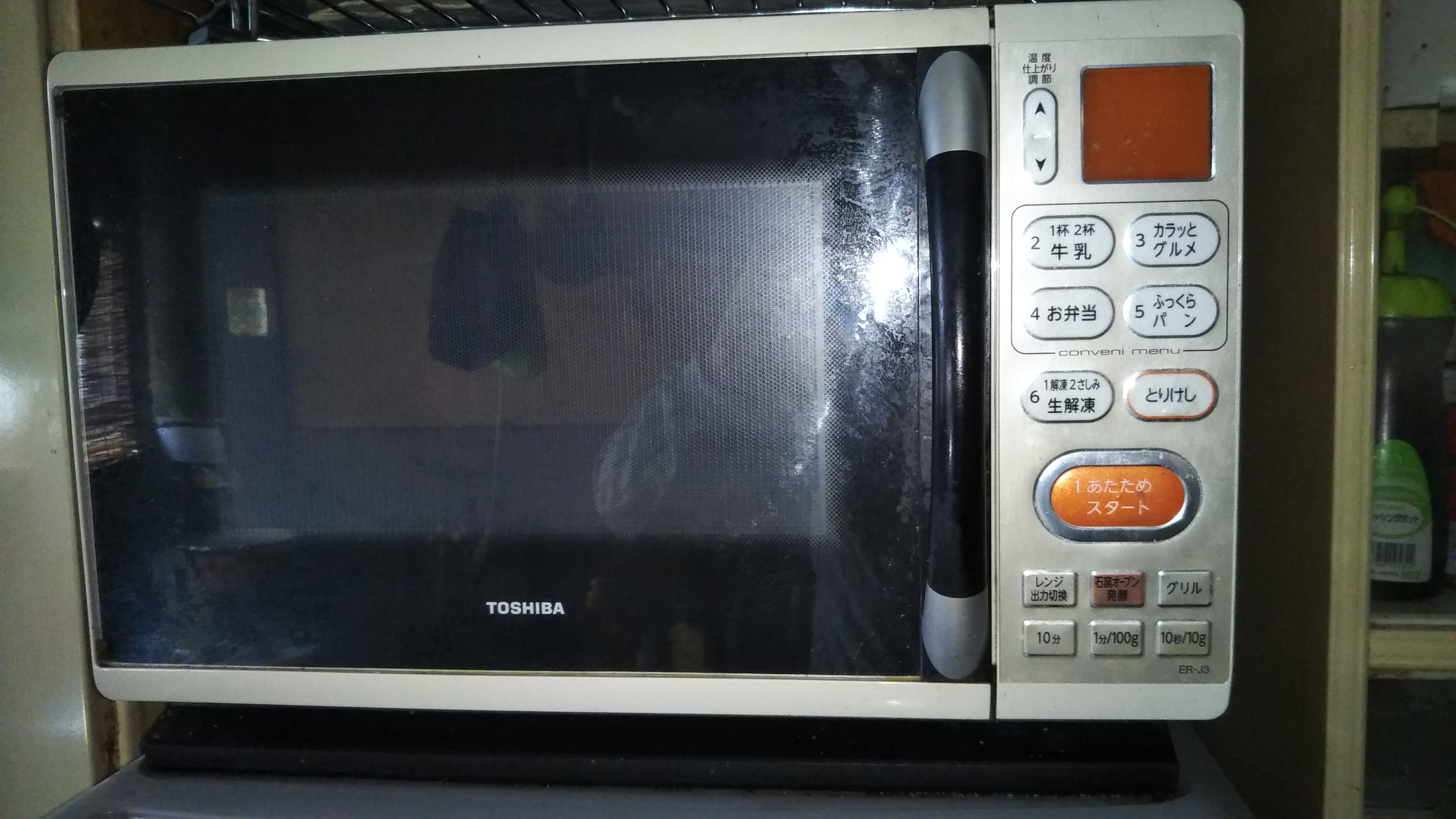
Toshiba microwave oven

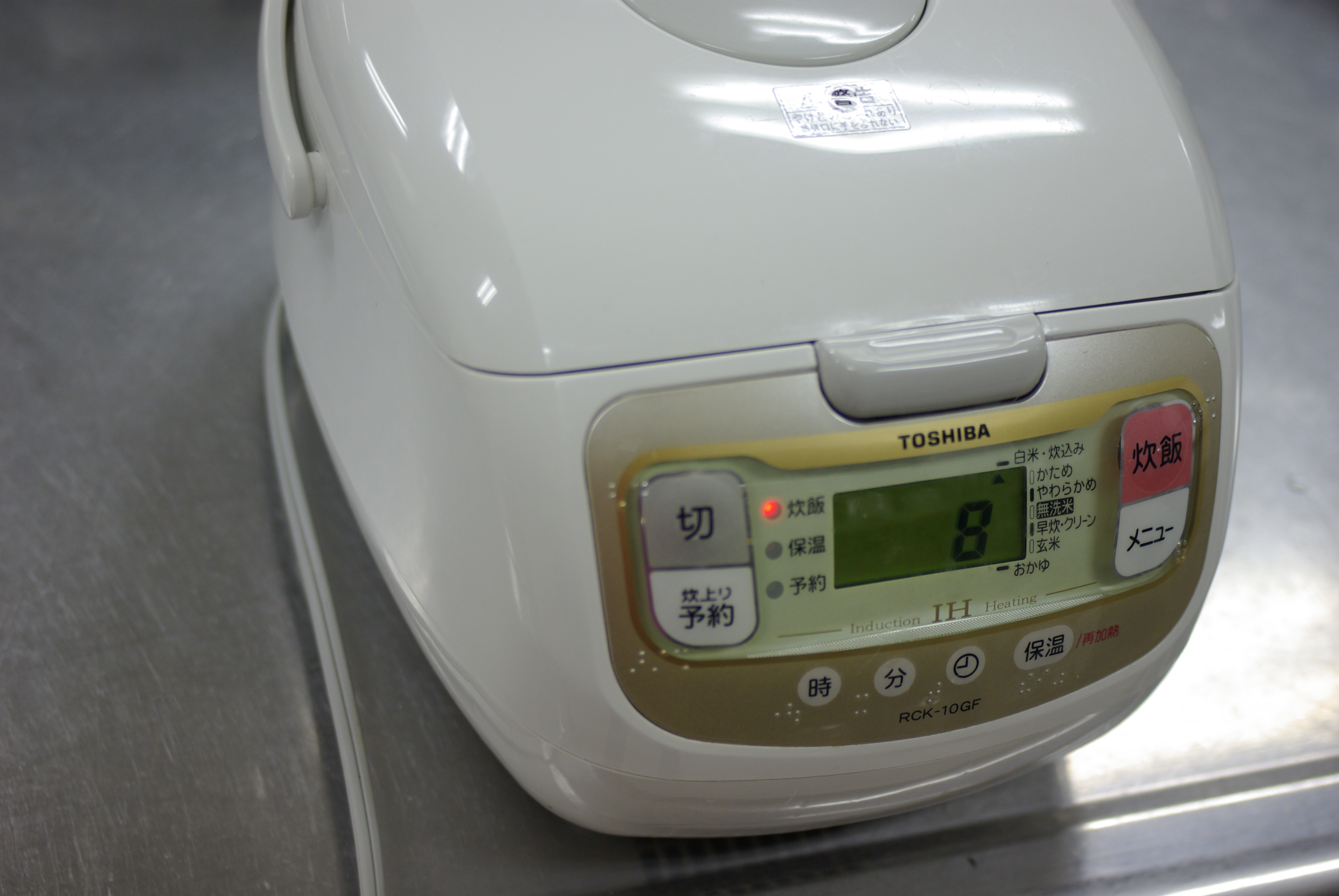
Toshiba rice cooker

Toshiba air conditioner

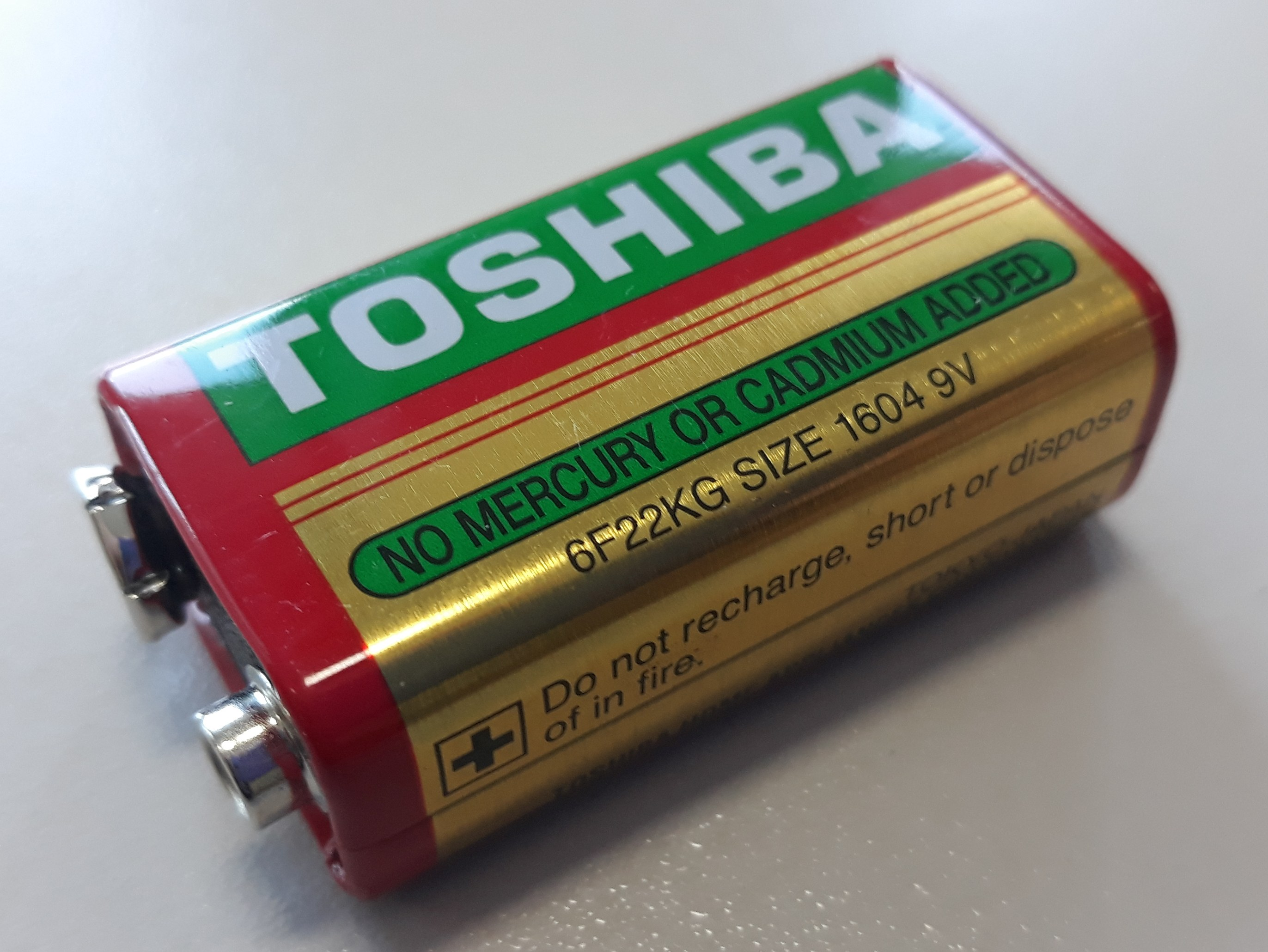
Toshiba battery

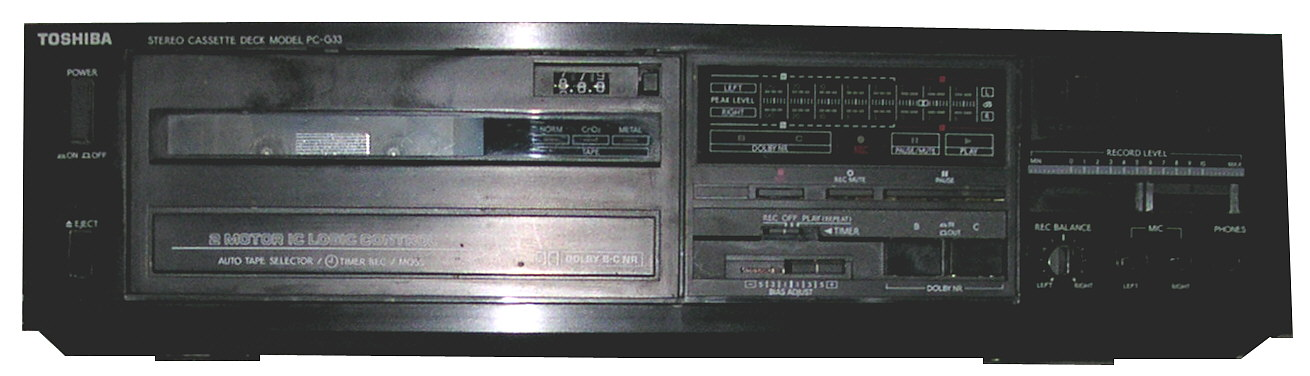
Toshiba PC-G33

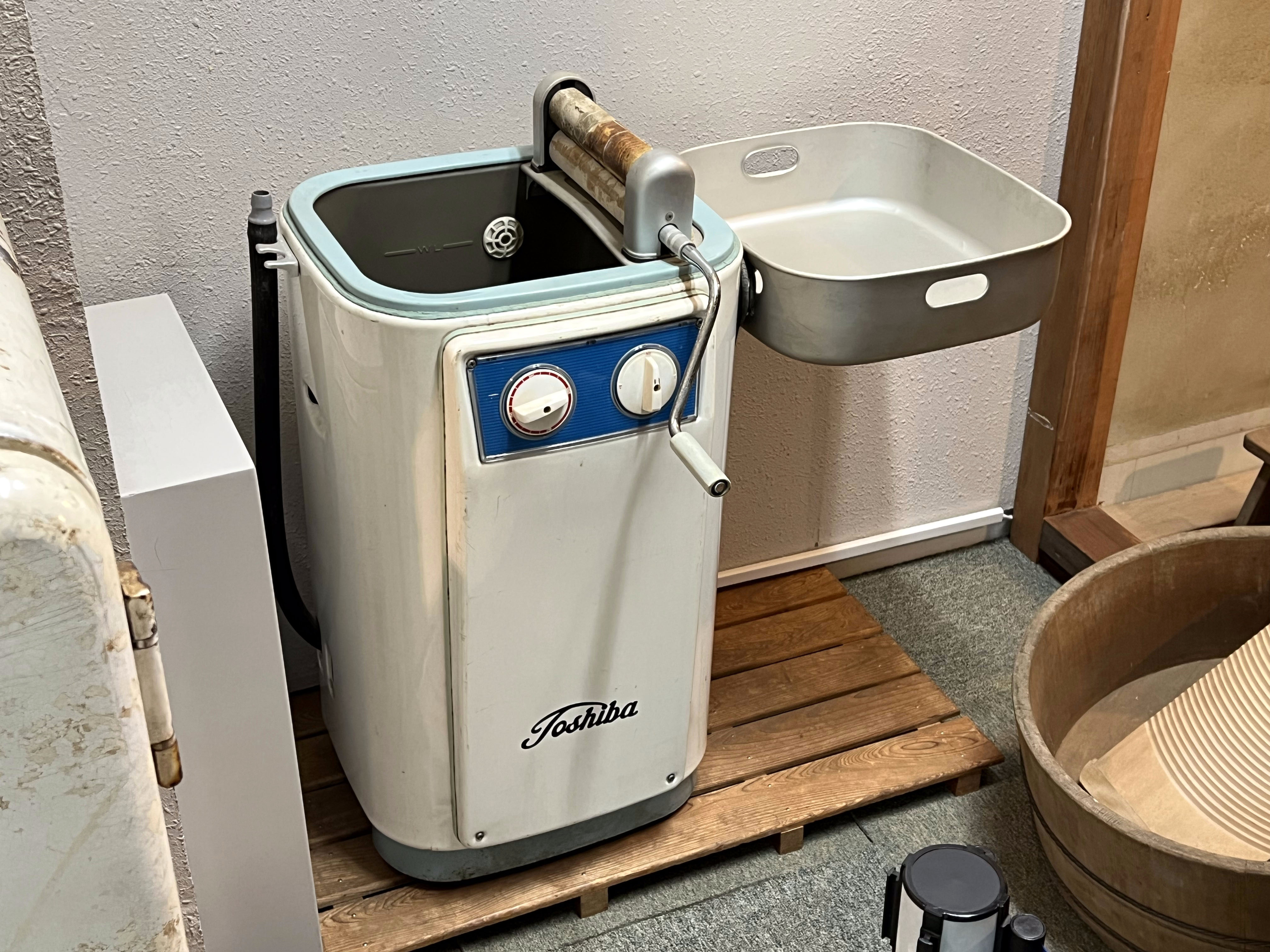
Toshiba washing machine

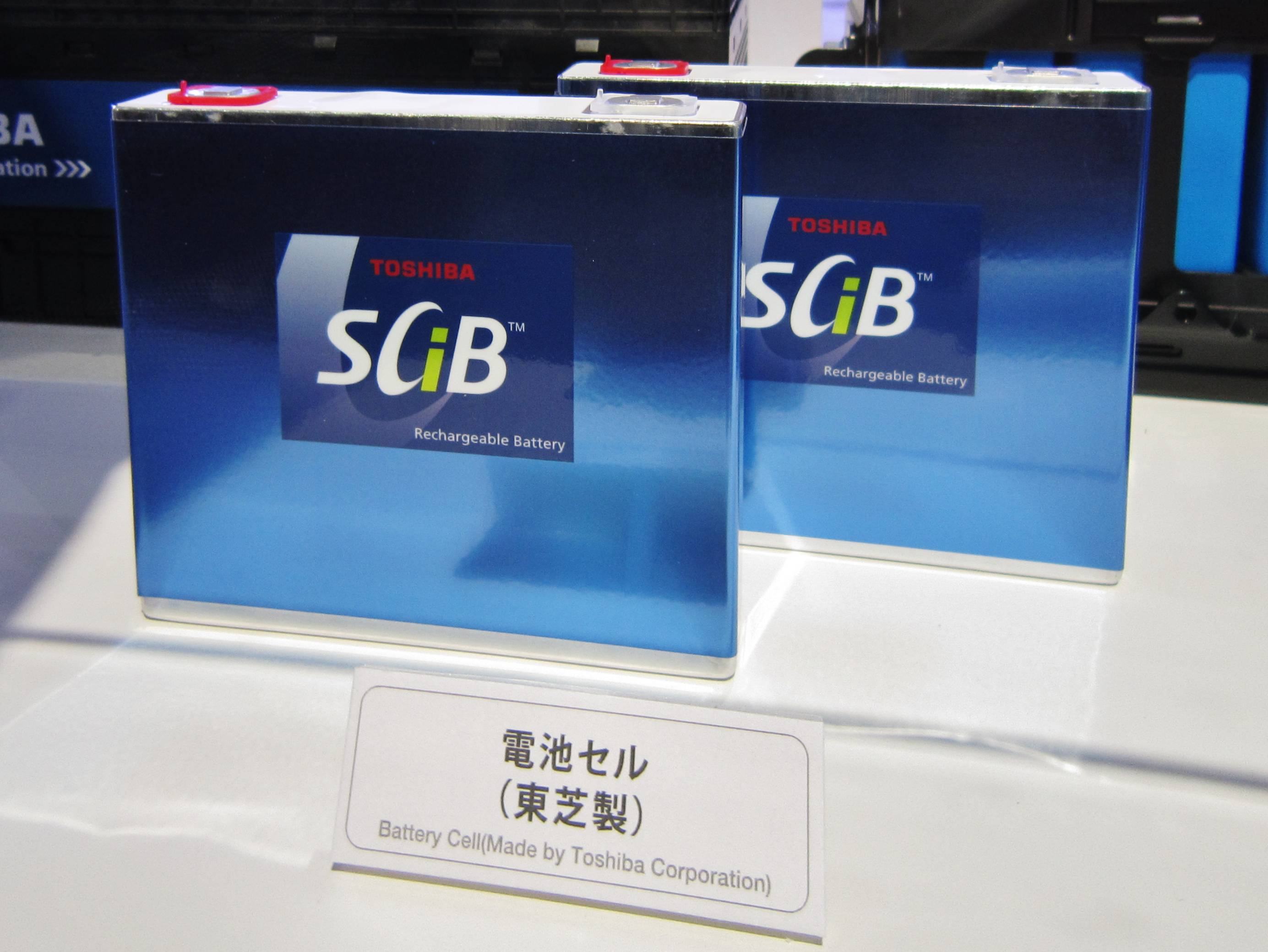
Toshiba SCiB rechargeable battery

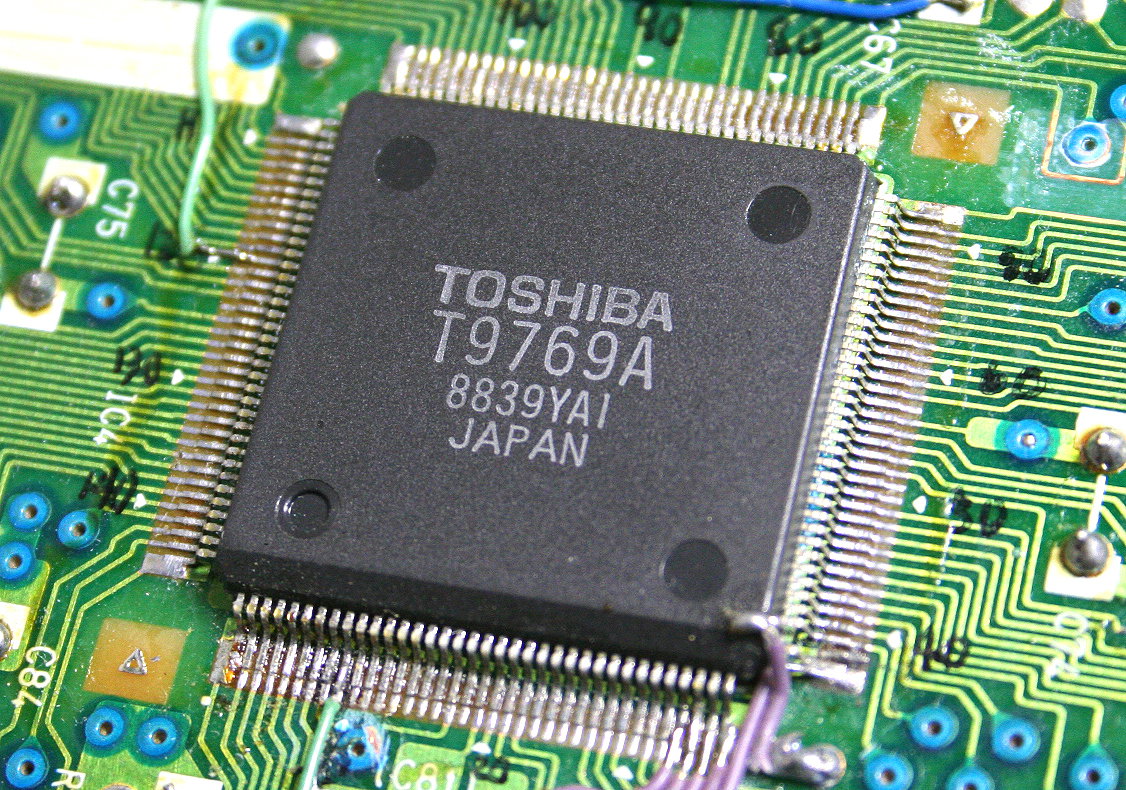
Toshiba T9769A integrated circuit

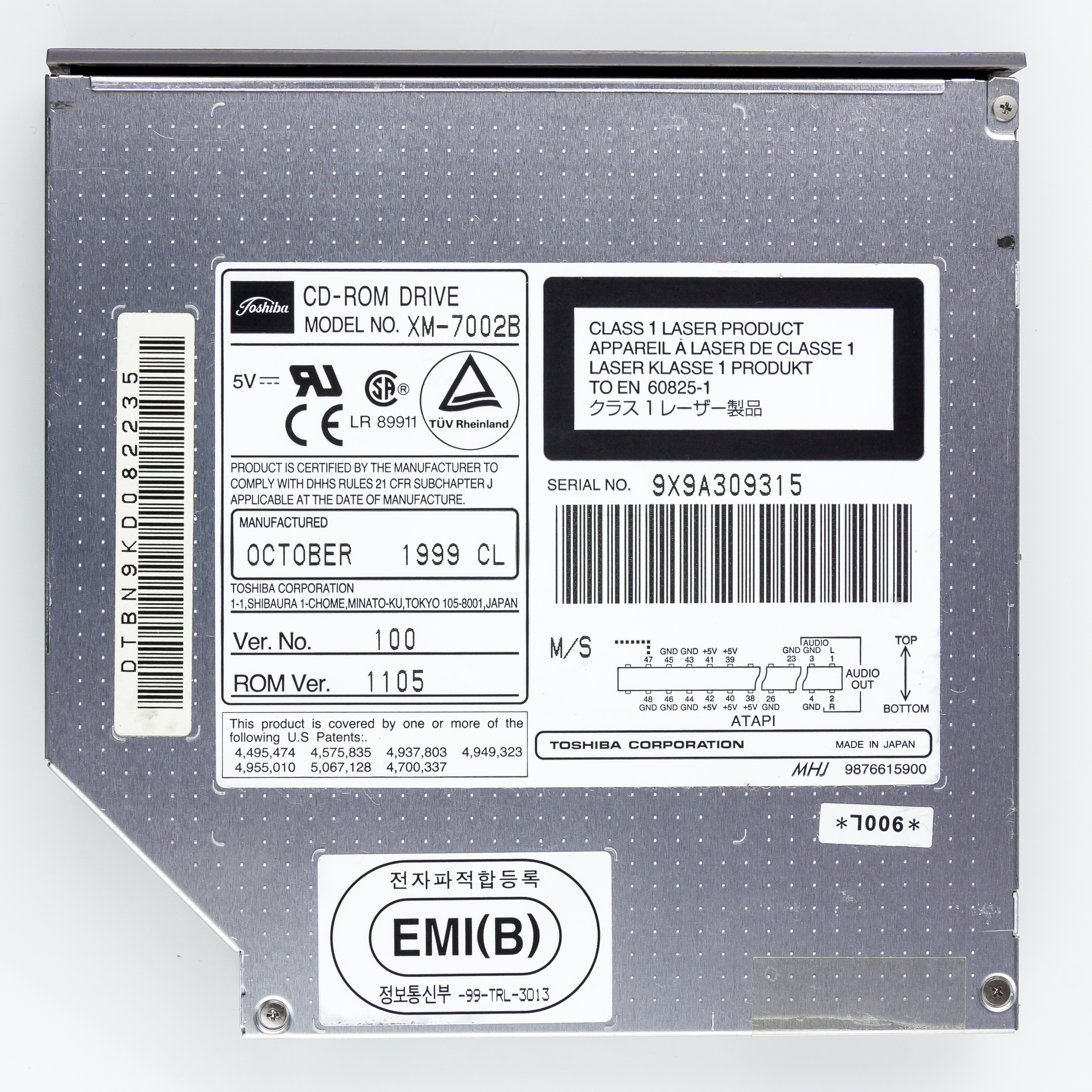
Slimline CD-ROM Drive Toshiba XM-7002B

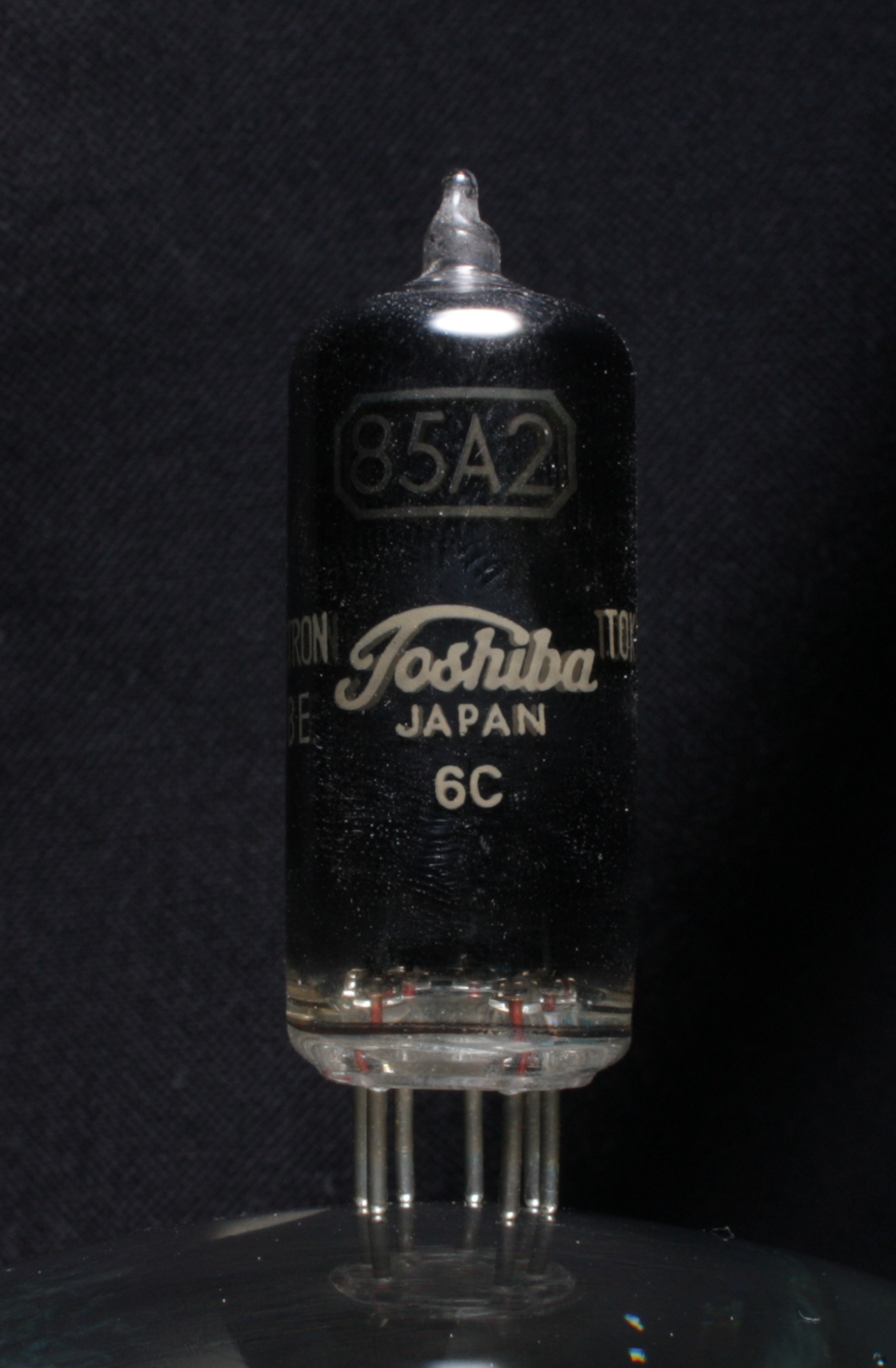
Toshiba 85A2

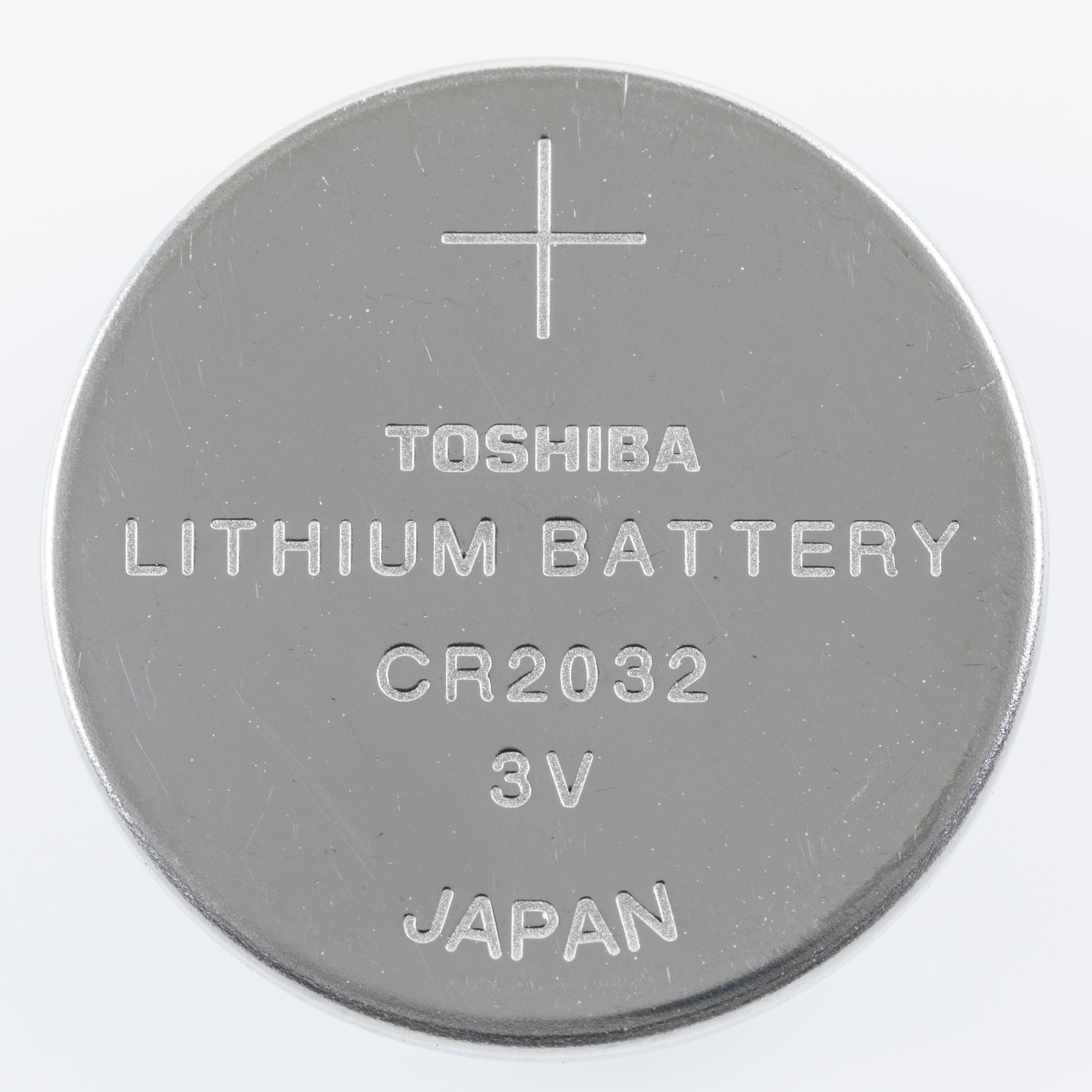
Coin cell Toshiba CR2032

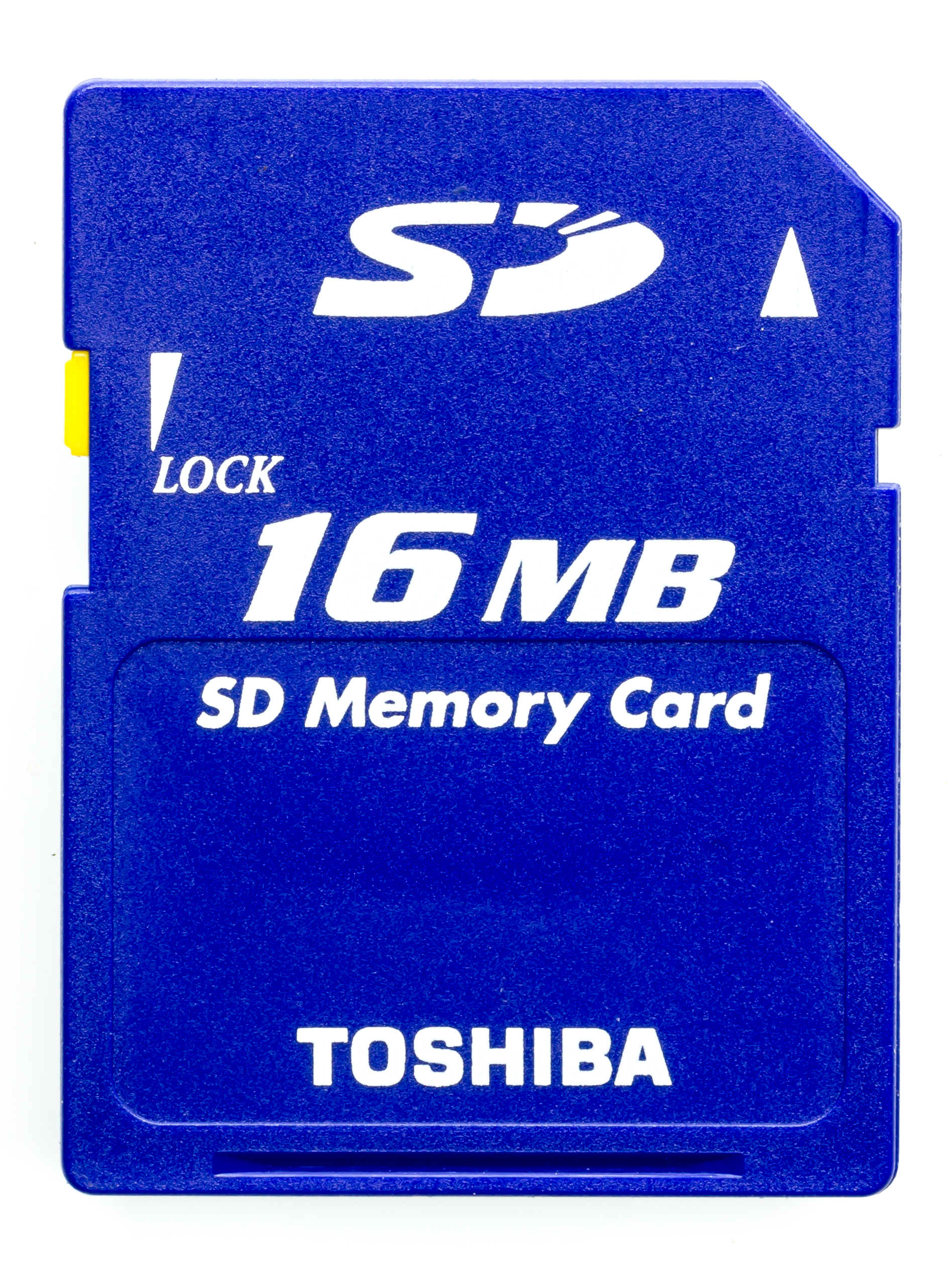
16MB SD Card by Toshiba

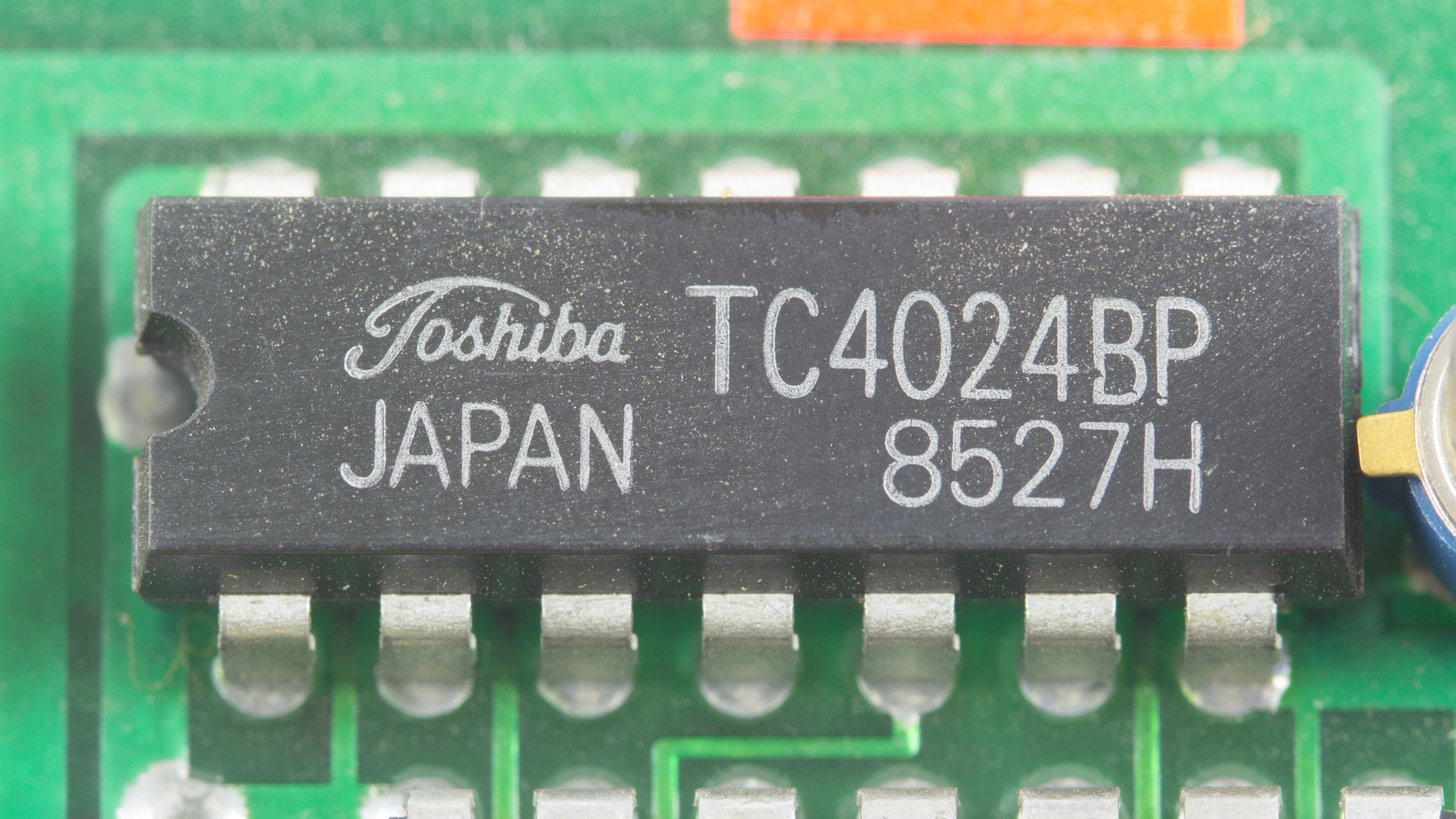
Toshiba TC4024BP - 7-stage binary ripple counter

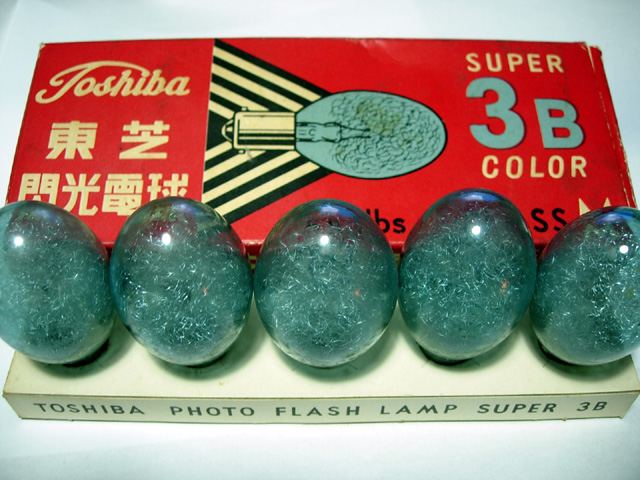
Toshiba Super3B

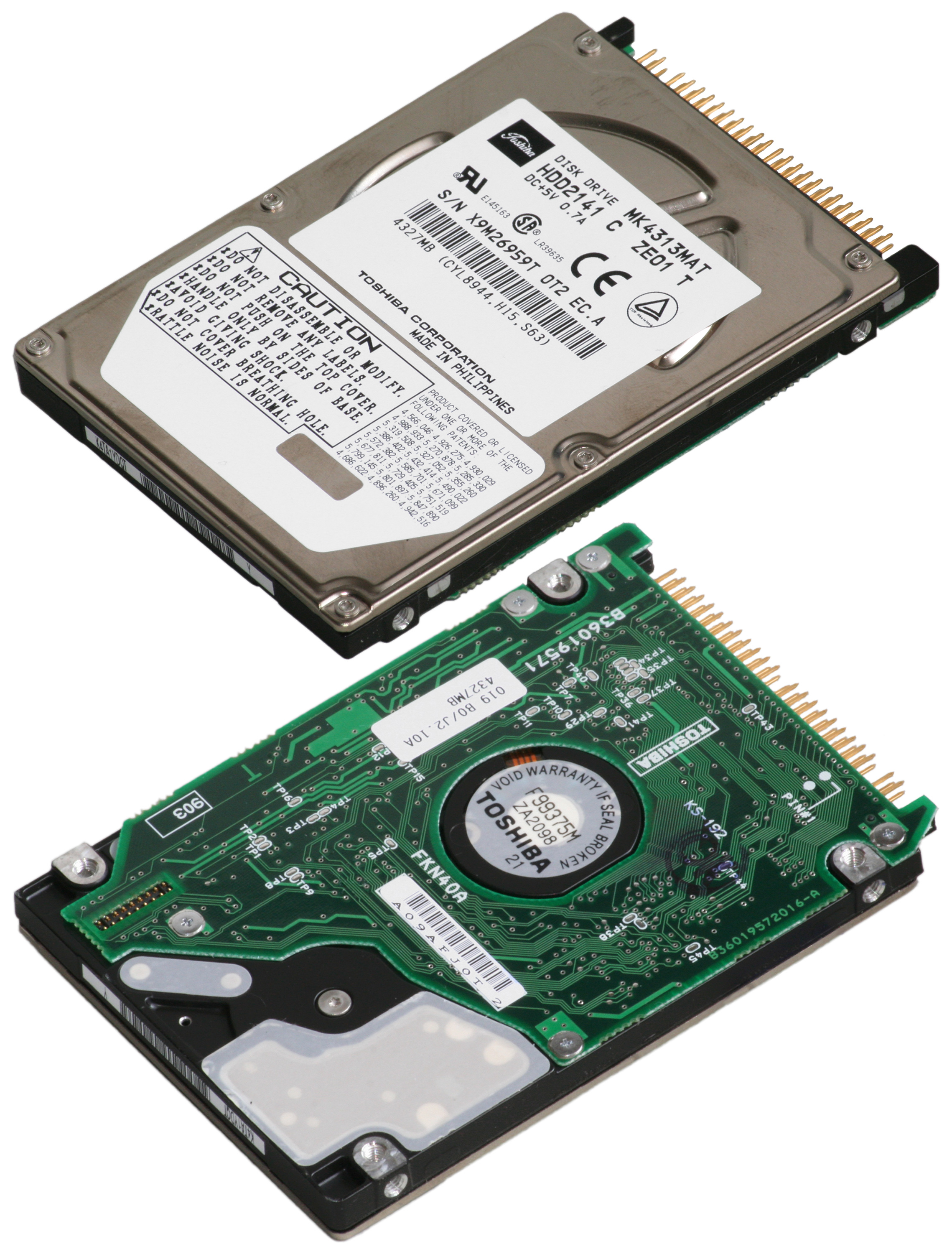
Toshiba hard disk

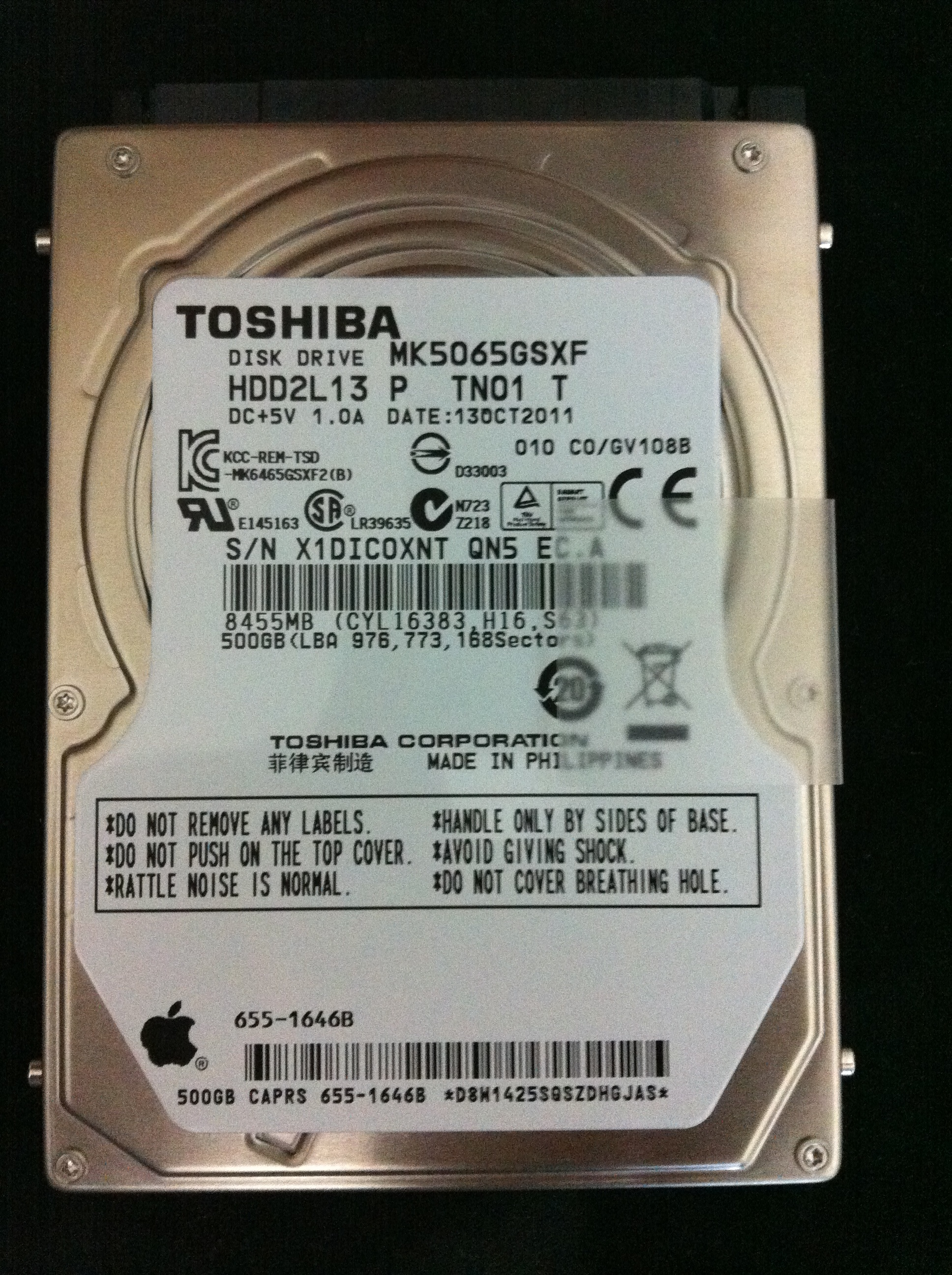
Toshiba MK5065GSXF for Apple OEM

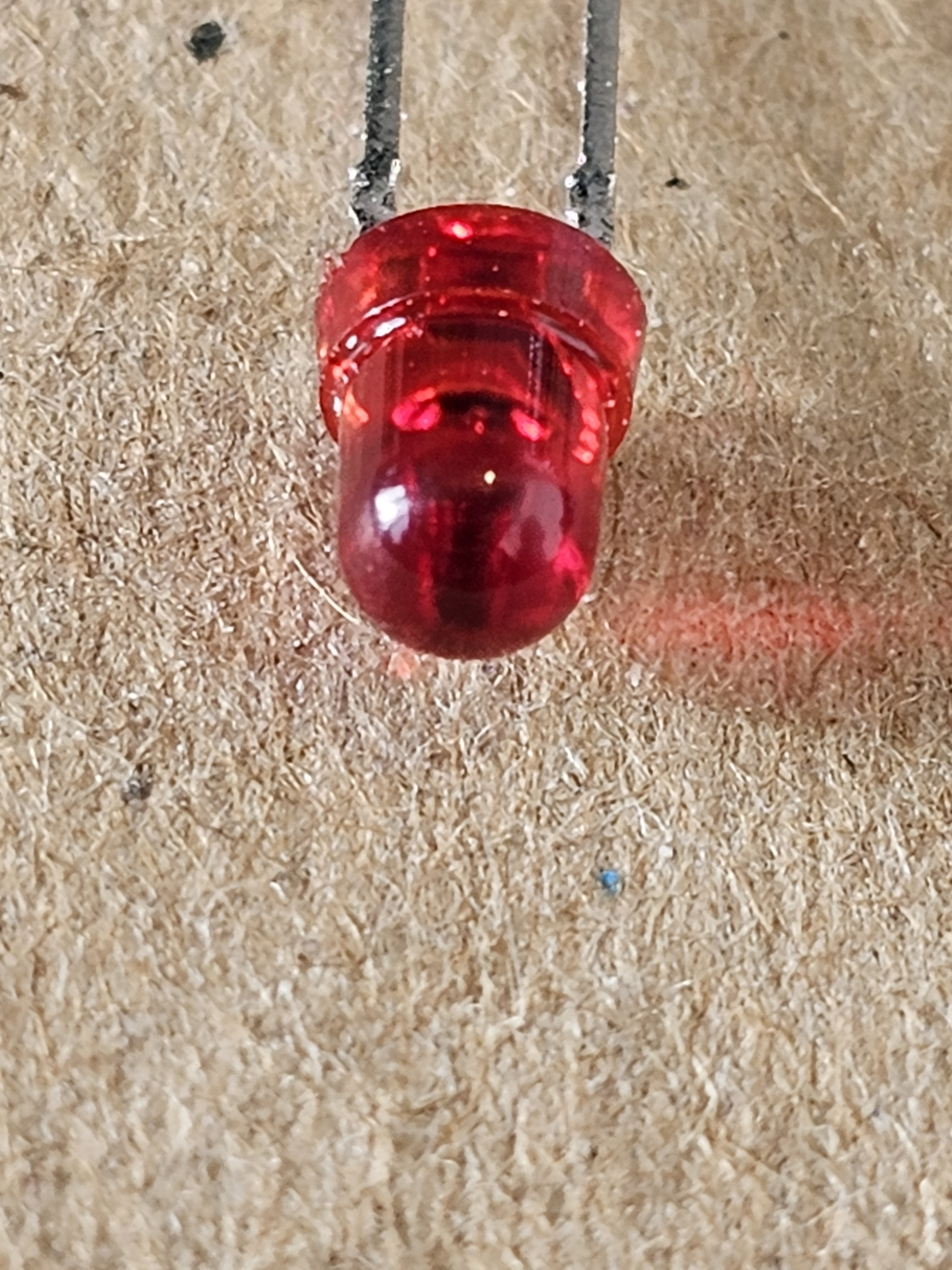
Toshiba TLUR123 3mm GaAsP

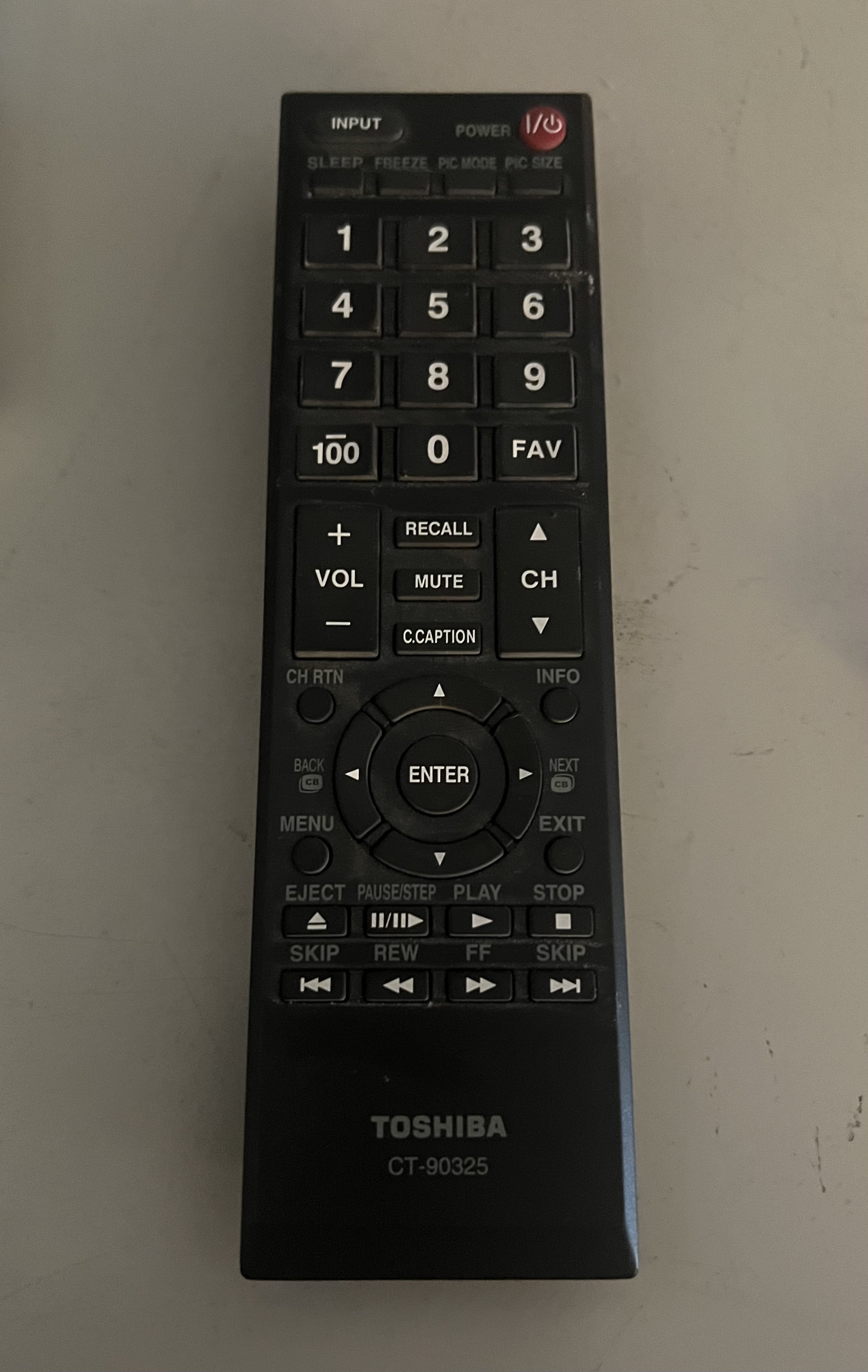
A Toshiba remote control.

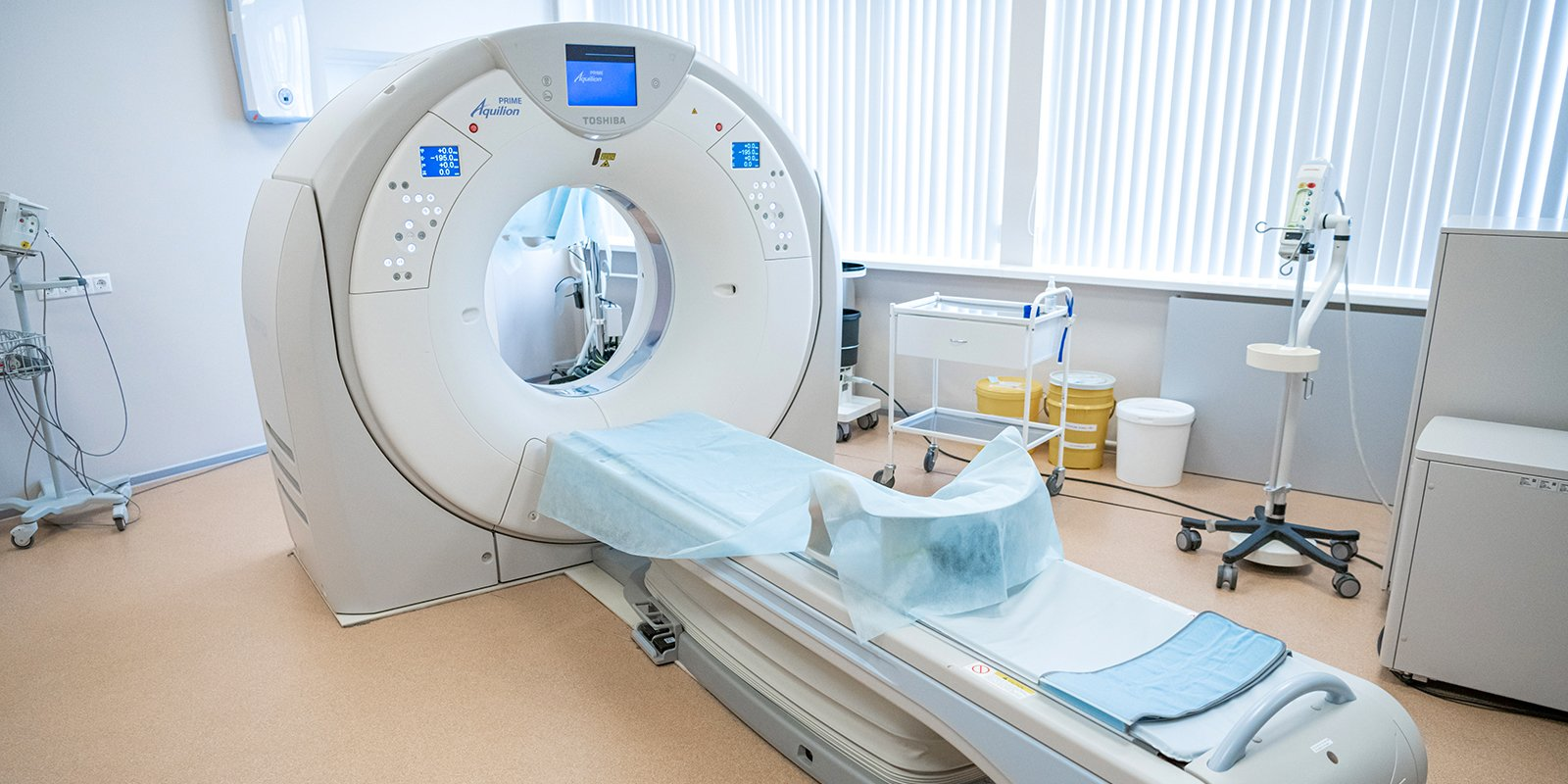
Toshiba Aquilion Prime CT scanner

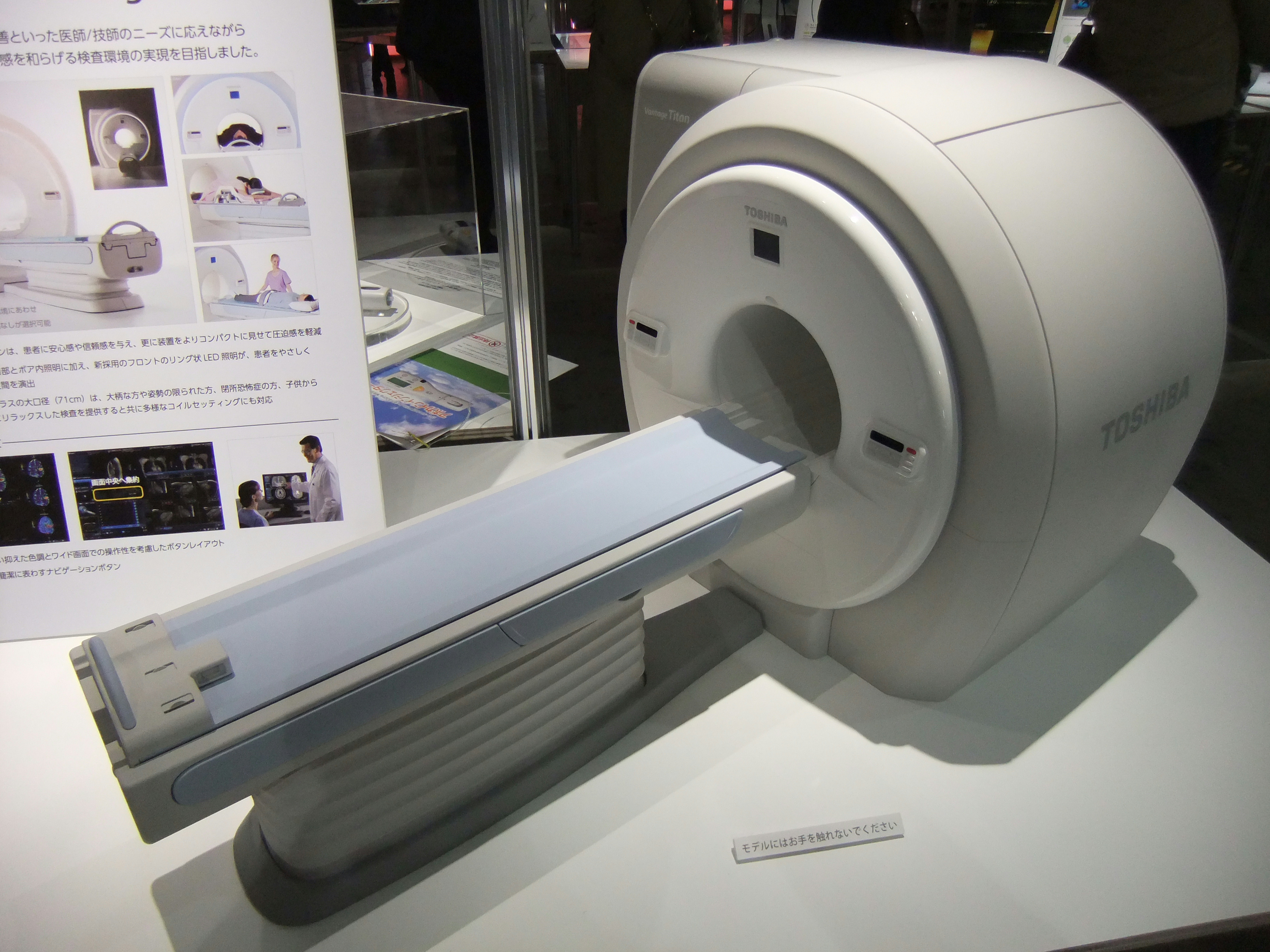
Toshiba Vantage Titan MRT-2004 MRI scanner

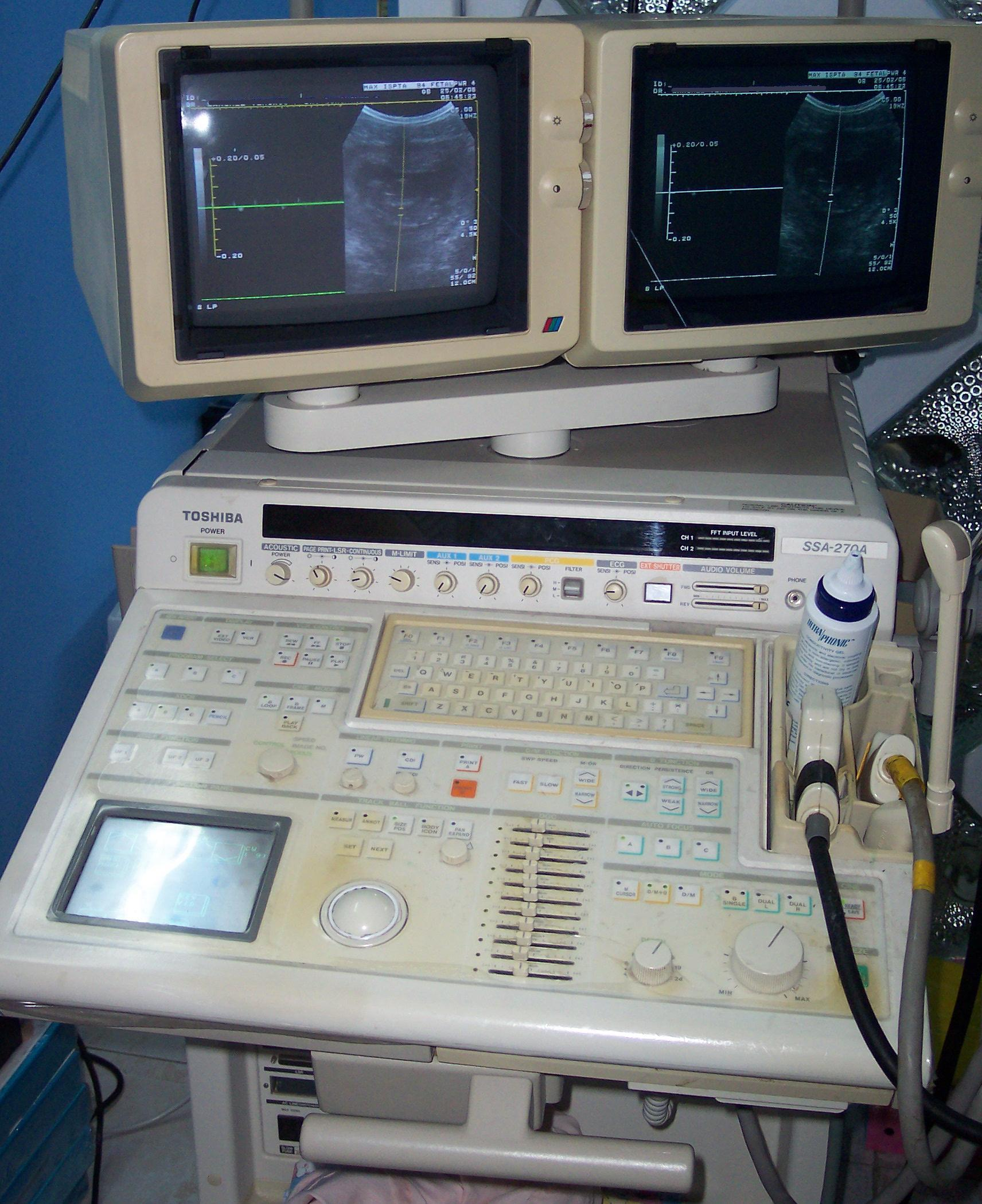
Toshiba medical ultrasound scanner

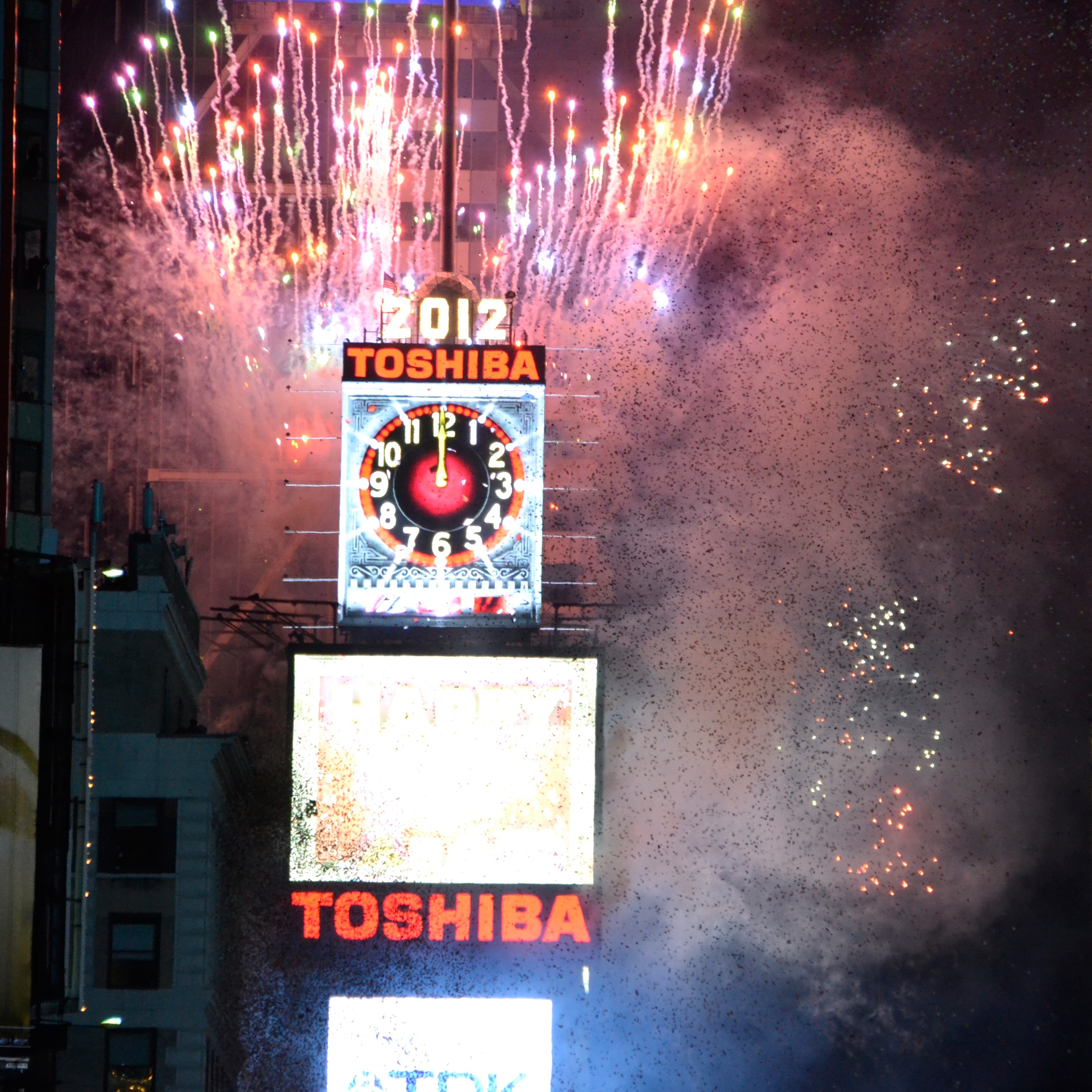
ToshibaVision screen in use during the ball drop in Times Square from 2008 to 2018

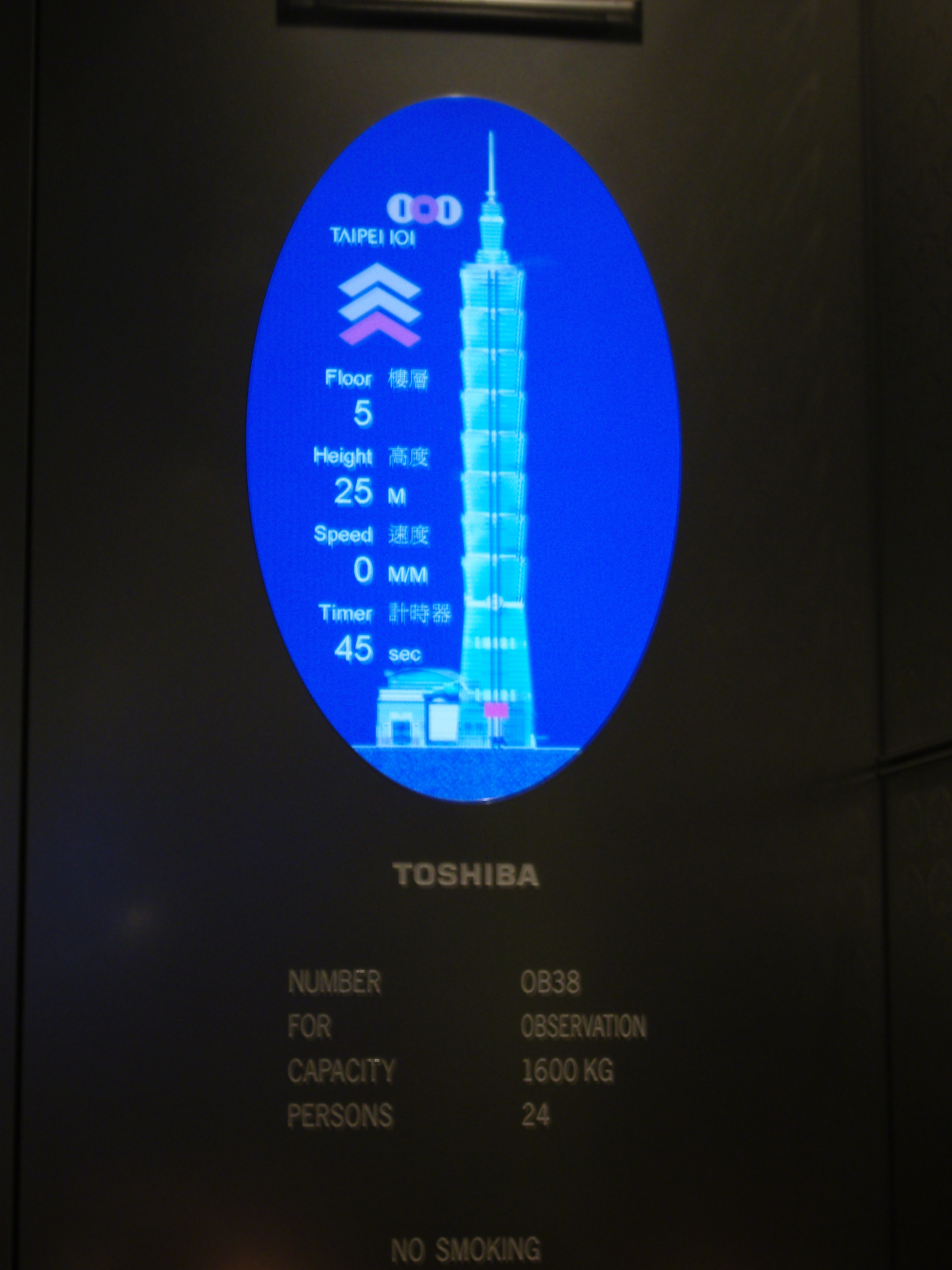
Toshiba elevator in Taipei 101

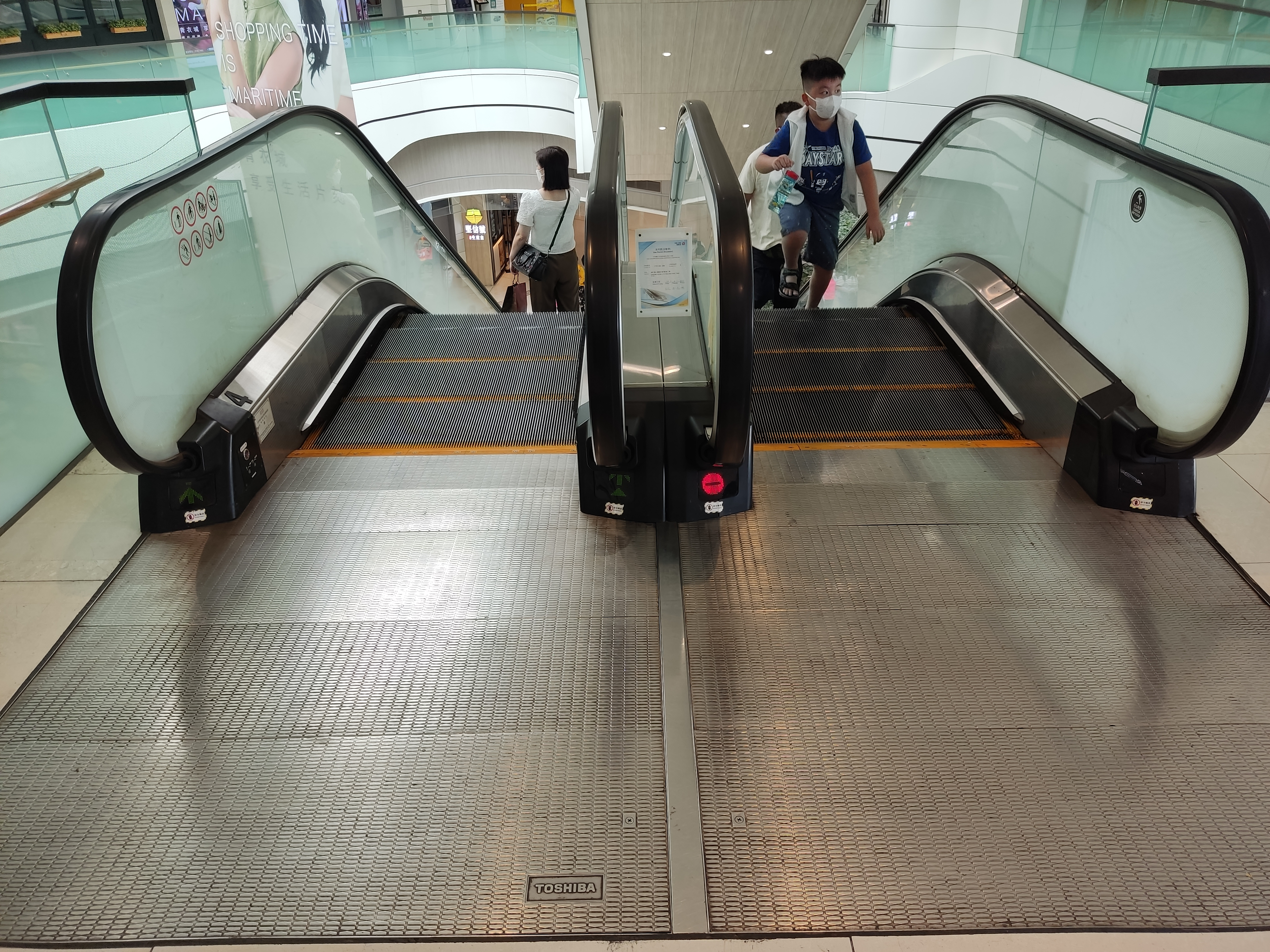
Toshiba escalators

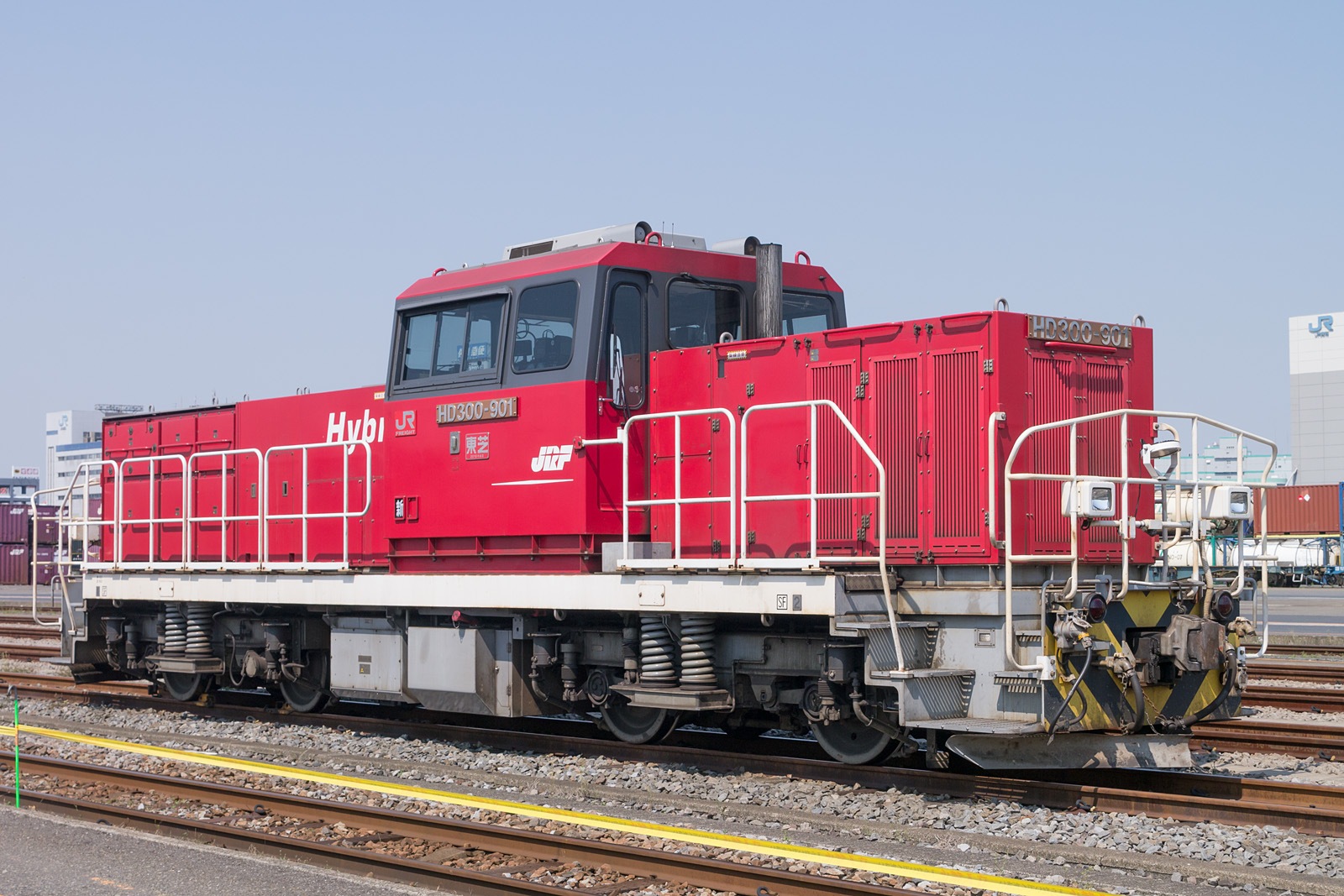
Toshiba locomotive Class HD300

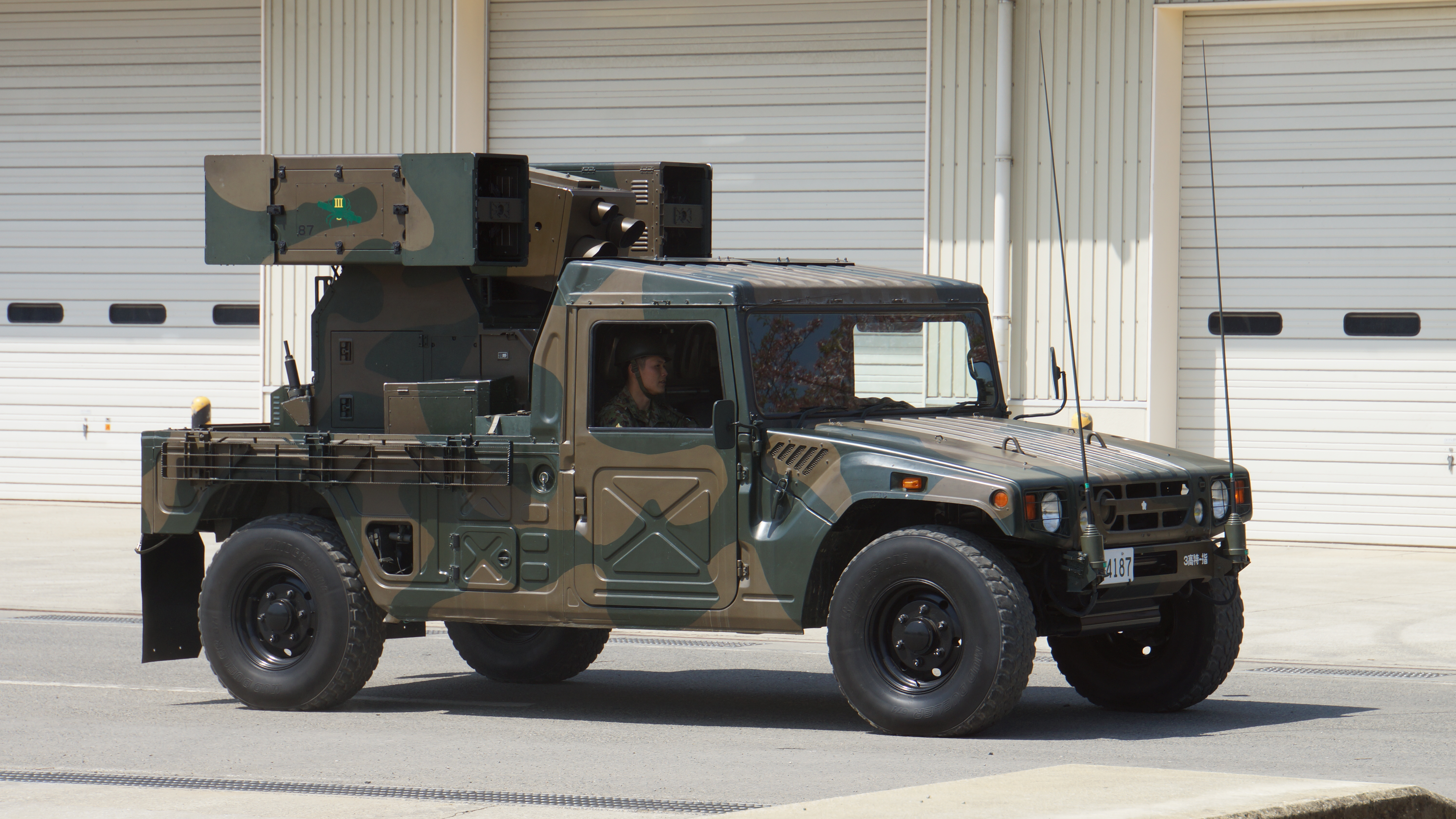
Toshiba Type 93 surface-to-air missile

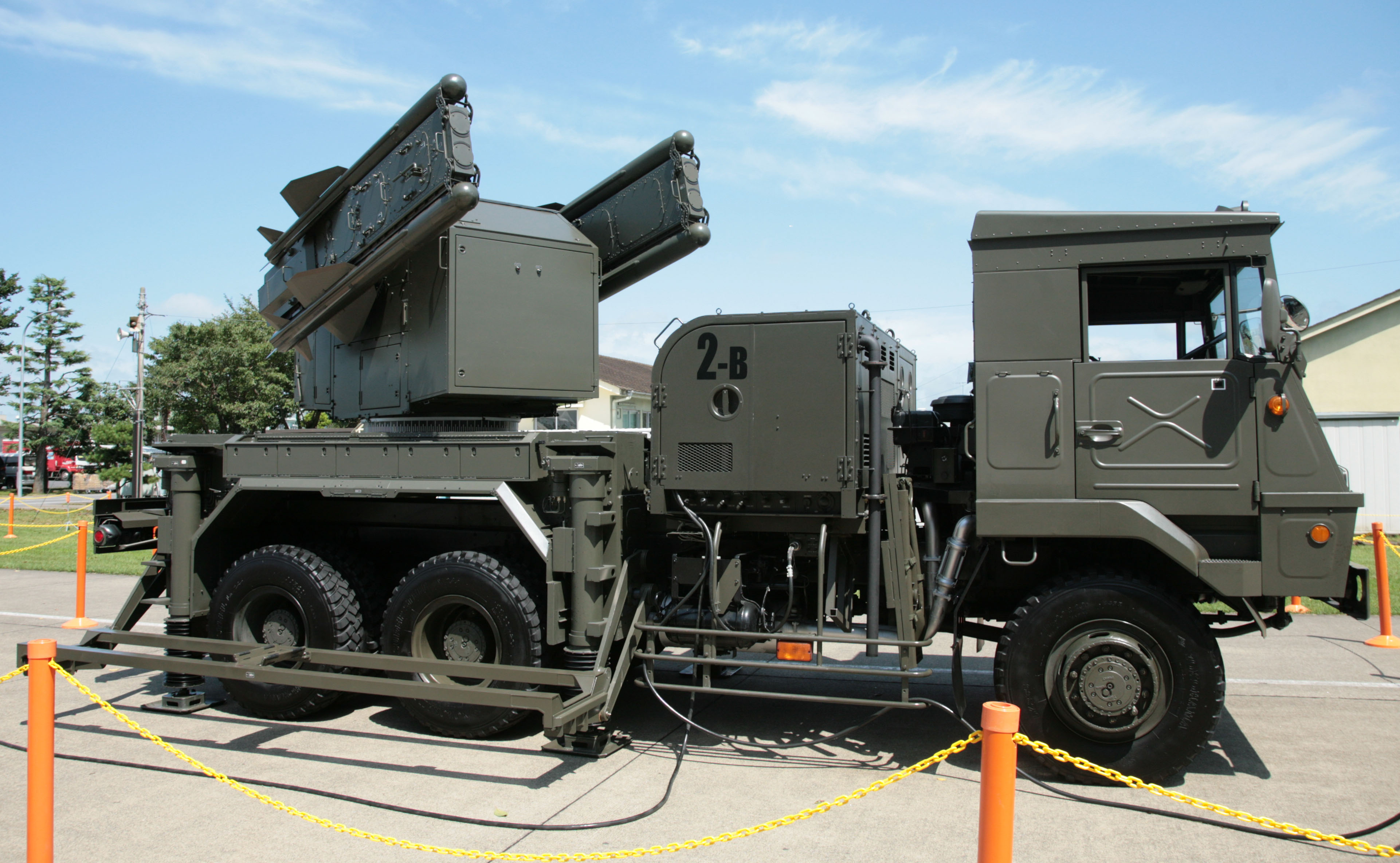
Toshiba Tan-SAM Type 81 SAM 6 x 6 launcher

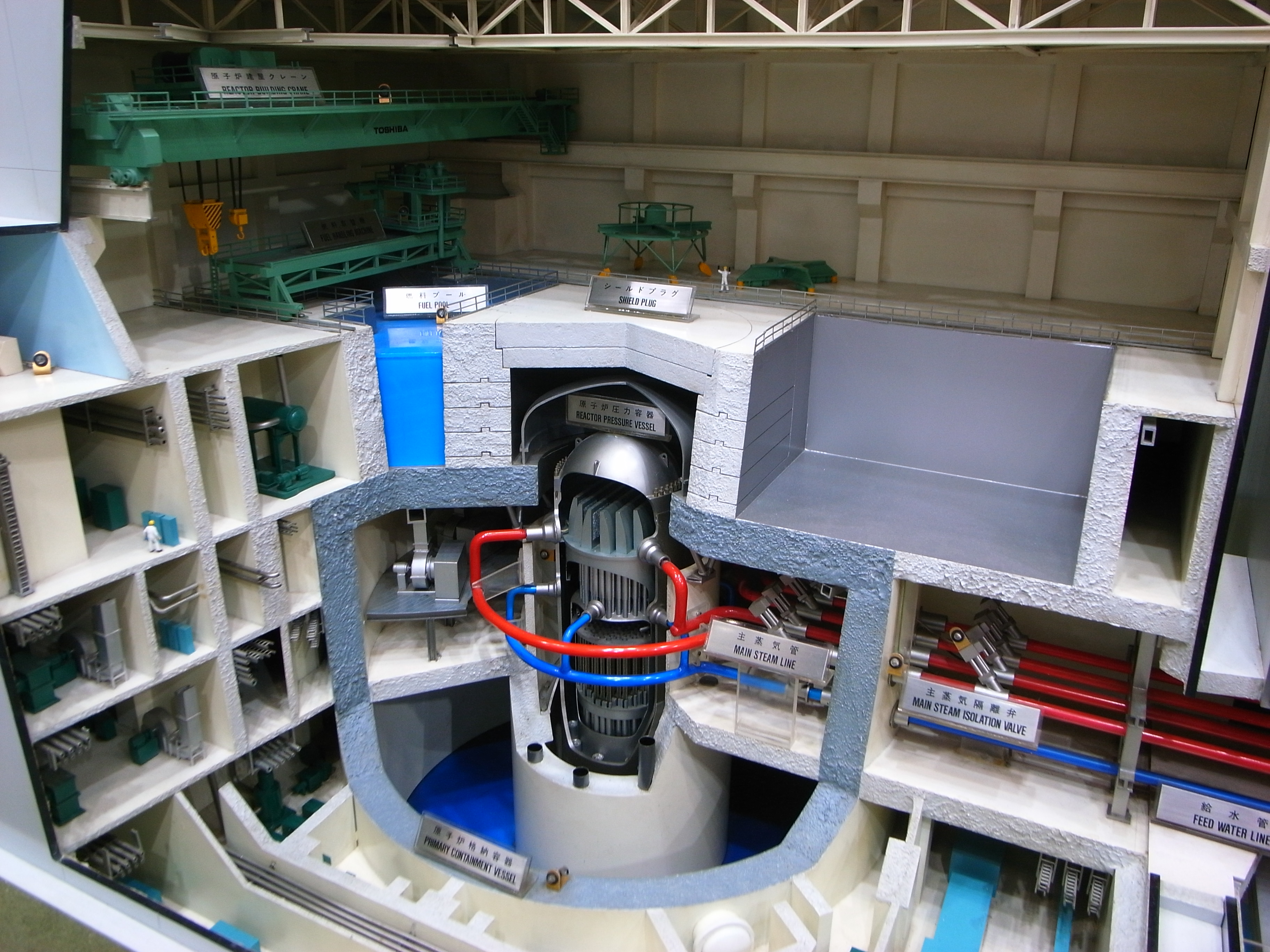
Model of the nuclear power plant from Toshiba with Advanced boiling water reactor

=== HD DVD ===
HD DVD logo

Toshiba had played a critical role in the development and proliferation of DVD. On 19 February 2008, Toshiba announced that it would be discontinuing its HD DVD storage format, the successor of DVD, following defeat in a format war against Blu-ray. The HD DVD format had failed after most of the major US film studios backed the Blu-ray format, which was developed by Sony, Panasonic, Philips and Pioneer Corporation. Conceding the abandonment of HD DVD, Toshiba's president, Atsutoshi Nishida said "We concluded that a swift decision would be best [and] if we had continued, that would have created problems for consumers, and we simply had no chance to win".

Toshiba continued to supply retailers with machines until the end of March 2008, and continued to provide technical support to the estimated one million people worldwide who owned HD DVD players and recorders. Toshiba announced a new line of stand-alone Blu-ray players as well as drives for PCs and laptops, and subsequently joined the BDA, the industry body which oversees the development of the Blu-ray format.

=== Televisions ===
REGZA wordmark

In 2006 to consolidate its flat-panel TVs under an unified brand, Toshiba launched Regza.

REGZA (Real Expression Guaranteed by amaZing Architecture) is a unified television brand created by Toshiba and now owned (since 2017) by Chinese company Hisense. It was made official in February 2006 to serve as the umbrella name for Toshiba's flat-panel TVs worldwide, mostly liquid-crystal display (LCD) but briefly around 2006-2007 also some plasma display (PDP) models. The sub-brand strategy was also made to mirror the competitors' Aquos and Bravia names and Toshiba had previously only used the sub-brand Face in Japan but not globally.

As of 2026, Toshiba REGZA televisions are designed and engineered by TVS REGZA Corporation (a subsidiary of Hisense) based in Kawasaki, Kanagawa for the Japanese market. In the North American market (where the REGZA name disappeared around 2010) Toshiba TVs are made and designed by Hisense often rebranded. In the European market (where too the REGZA brand is no longer marketed), Toshiba TVs are budget sets made by Turkish white-label manufacturer Vestel.

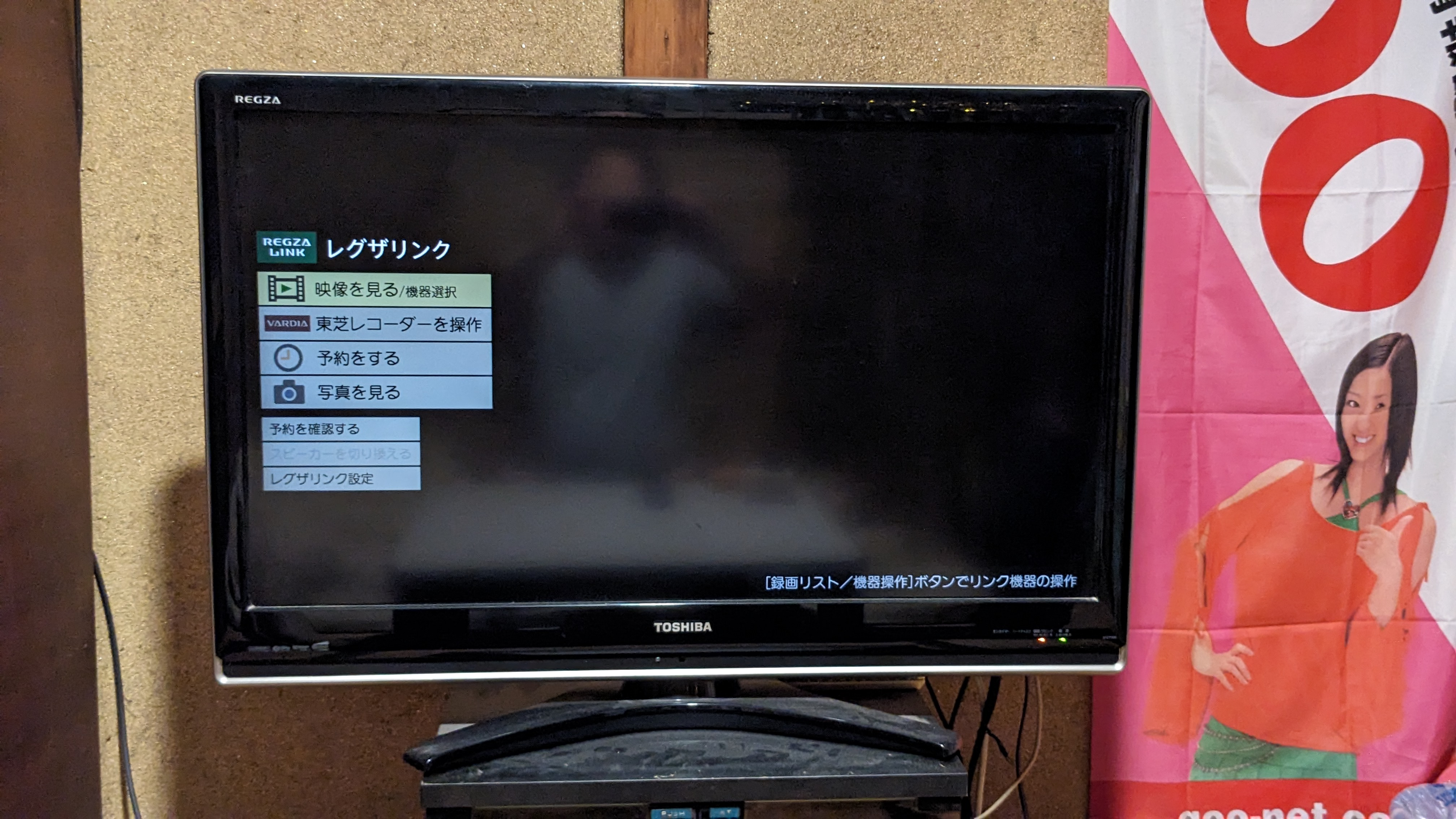
A 37" Toshiba Regza LCD TV from 2008

==== Brand history and ownership ====
Toshiba decided to downsize and exit the TV set production business entirely, having already ended domestic production in 2012 by closing the Fukaya, Saitama plant. From March 2015 new TVs in America carrying the Toshiba name were designed and produced by Compal Electronics, a Taiwanese company, to which Toshiba has licensed its name. For the European market on the other hand, Toshiba licensed its name to Turkish company Vestel in 2015.

In 2018, Chinese company Hisense purchased Toshiba's television division including patents and the rights to he Toshiba and REGZA names for 40 years. Hisense took over the North American license in 2021 after Compal's contract ended (with Toshiba sets being rebranded Hisense sets with software changes) while white label manufacturer Vestel continues to be the maker of Toshiba branded sets for Europe. The Japan-based division acquired by Hisense in 2017 was renamed to TVS REGZA Corporation and continue to bespokedly design and engineer Regza TVs for Japan while manufacturing and supplies are dealt by Hisense.

As of 2026, Toshiba REGZA is the leading best-selling maker of TVs in Japan.

=== Personal computers ===
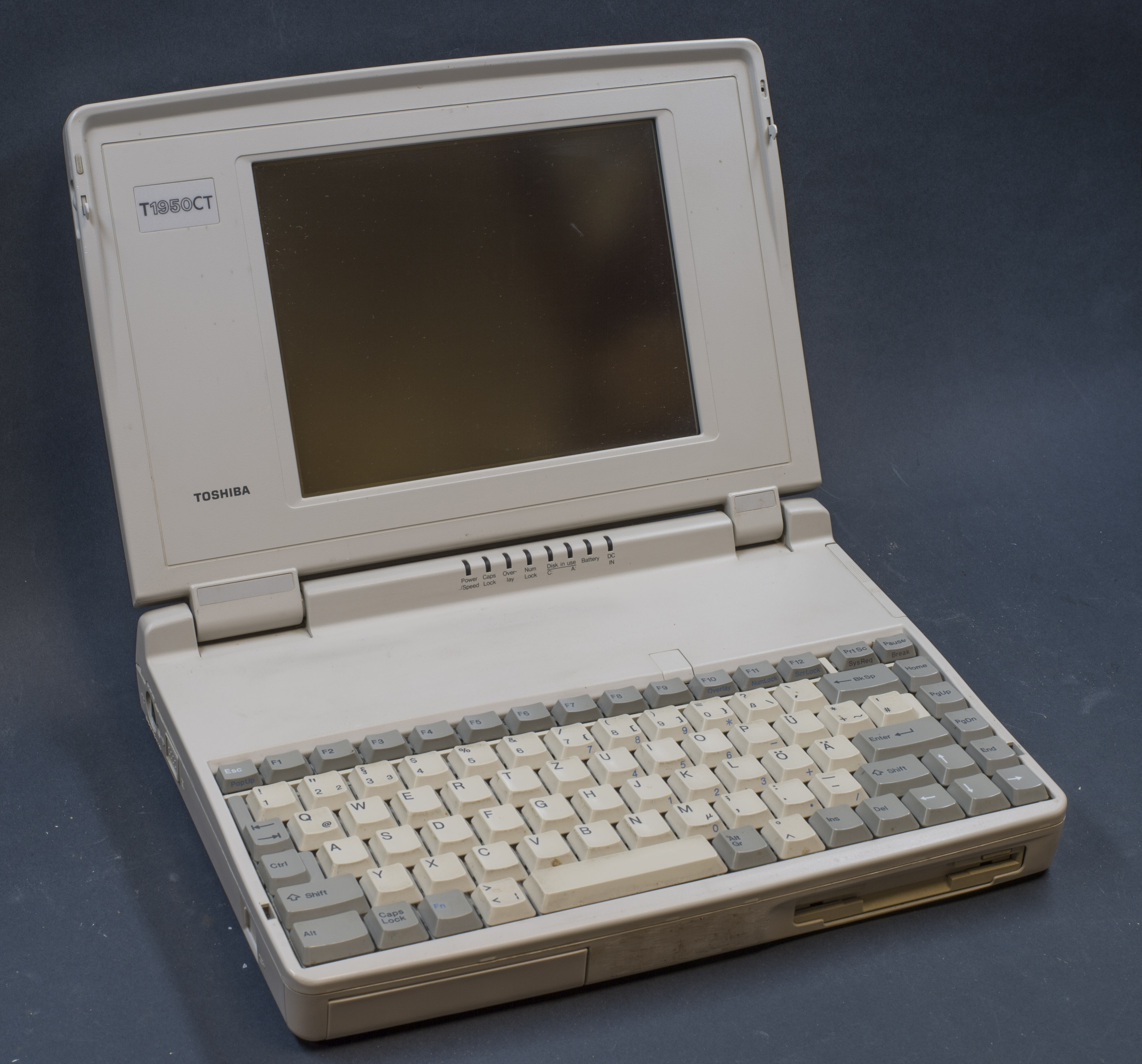
A Toshiba T1950CT notebook computer

In 1985, Toshiba released the T1100, the world's first commercially accepted laptop PC. Toshiba designed and developed PCs, predominantly laptops, under several product lines including Satellite, Portégé, Libretto, Qosmio and Tecra. Toshiba initialized process of divestment of the personal computer and laptop business, Toshiba Client Solutions, in 2018 with sale of 80.1% of shares to Sharp Corporation. Eventually Toshiba fully exited from the personal computing market in June 2020, transferring the remaining 19.9% shares in Toshiba Client Solutions (since being renamed to Dynabook Inc.) to Sharp. Toshiba's divested personal computing business adopted the Dynabook name after a computer concept targeted for children and after one of its product lines.

=== Flash memory ===
In the 1980s, a Toshiba team led by Fujio Masuoka invented flash memory, both NOR and NAND types. In March 2015, Toshiba announced the development of the first 48-layer, three-dimensional flash memory. The new flash memory is based on a vertical stacking technology that Toshiba calls BiCS (Bit Cost Scaling), stores two bits of data per transistor, and can store 128Gbits (16GB) per chip. This allowed flash memory to keep scaling up the capacity as Moore's Law was considered to be obsolete. Toshiba's memory division was spun off as Toshiba Memory Corporation, now Kioxia.

== Environmental record ==
Toshiba has been judged as making "low" efforts to lessen its impact on the environment. In November 2012, it came second from the bottom in Greenpeace's 18th edition of the Guide to Greener Electronics that ranks electronics companies according to their policies on products, energy, and sustainable operations. Toshiba received 2.3 of a possible 10 points, with the top company (WIPRO) receiving 7.1 points. "Zero" scores were received in the categories "Clean energy policy advocacy", "Use of recycled plastics in products" and "Policy and practice on sustainable sourcing of fibres for paper". In 2010, Toshiba reported that all of its new LCD TVs comply with the Energy Star standards and 34 models exceed the requirements by 30% or more.

Toshiba partnered with China's Tsinghua University in 2008 in order to form a research facility to focus on energy conservation and the environment. The new Toshiba Energy and Environment Research Center is located in Beijing where forty students from the university will work to research electric power equipment and new technologies that will help stop the global warming process. Through this partnership, Toshiba hopes to develop products that will better protect the environment and save China. This contract between Tsinghua University and Toshiba originally began in October 2007 when they signed an agreement on joint energy and environment research. The projects that they conduct work to reduce car pollution and to create power systems that don't negatively affect the environment.

On 28 December 1970, Toshiba began the construction of unit 3 of the Fukushima Daiichi Nuclear Power Plant, which was damaged in the Fukushima I nuclear accidents on 14 March 2011. In April 2011, CEO Norio Sasaki declared nuclear energy would "remain as a strong option" even after the Fukushima I nuclear accidents. In late 2013, Toshiba entered the solar power business in Germany, installing PV systems on apartment buildings.

== See also ==
- List of Toshiba subsidiaries
