= GQY =

GQY or Gqy may refer to:

- GQY Video, company directed by nephew of Qi Xin, mother of Chinese paramount leader Xi Jinping
- GQY, a company listed on the Shenzhen Stock Exchange
- Gqy, mineral symbol for Goldquarryite
- GQY, investor in Meta (augmented reality company)
