= List of companies listed on the Shenzhen Stock Exchange =

This is a list of companies on the Shenzhen Stock Exchange up to 2011, along with their capital, industry, and listing date. Many of these are subsidiaries of state-owned enterprises.

== 000001–000099 ==
| Code | Short-name | | Full name | Listing date | Issued capital | Negotiable capital | Industry | Http |
| Code | English | Chinese | Full name | Listing date | Issued capital | Negotiable capital | Industry | Http |
|---|---|---|---|---|---|---|---|---|
| N/A | ZW Drive | N/A | ZW Drive | N/A | N/A | N/A | Electrical engineering | http://zw-drive.com |
| 000001 | PAB | 平安银行 | Ping An Bank Co, ltd. | 03.04.1991 | 19,405,918,198 | 19,405,752,680 | Financials | http://bank.pingan.com |
| 000002 | Vanke-A | 万科A | China Vanke Co, ltd. | 29.01.1991 | 9,724,196,533 | 9,715,170,043 | Real estate | http://www.vanke.com |
| 000004 | CAU-Tech | 国农科技 | Shenzhen CAU Technology Co, ltd. | 01.12.1990 | 83,976,684 | 82,604,584 | Manufacturing | http://www.sz000004.cn |
| 000005 | Fountain | 世纪星源 | Shenzhen Fountain Corporation | 10.12.1990 | 1,058,536,842 | 1,057,946,242 | Environmental protection | http://www.fountain.com.cn |
| 000006 | ZHENYE | 深振业A | Shenzhen Zhenye (Group) Co, ltd. | 27.04.1992 | 1,349,995,046 | 1,348,307,972 | Real estate | http://www.zhenye.com |
| 000007 | QUANXINHAO | 全新好 | Shenzhen Quanxinhao Co, ltd. | 13.04.1992 | 346,448,044 | 308,945,044 | Real estate | http://www.sz000007.com |
| 000008 | CHSR | 神州高铁 | China High-Speed Railway Technology Co, ltd. | 07.05.1992 | 2,780,795,346 | 2,593,770,878 | Manufacturing | http://www.shenzhou-gaotie.com |
| 000009 | CBG | 中国宝安 | China Bao'an Group Co, ltd. | 25.06.1991 | 2,579,213,965 | 2,543,836,879 | Conglomerates | http://www.chinabaoan.com |
| 000010 | EcoBeauty | *ST美丽 | Shenzhen EcoBeauty Co, ltd. | 27.10.1995 | 819,854,713 | 522,171,498 | Construction | |
| 000011 | PRD | 深物业A | Shenzhen Properties & Resources Development (Group) Ltd. | 30.03.1992 | 528,373,849 | 526,442,569 | Real estate | http://www.szwuye.com.cn |
| 000012 | CSG | 南玻A | CSG Holding Co, ltd. | 28.02.1992 | 1,998,827,103 | 1,957,741,961 | Manufacturing | http://www.csgholding.com |
| 000014 | SHAHE Industry | 沙河股份 | Shahe Industrial Co, ltd. | 02.06.1992 | 201,705,187 | 201,705,187 | Real estate | |
| 000016 | Konka Group | 深康佳A | Konka Group Co, ltd. | 27.03.1992 | 1,596,593,800 | 1,596,574,300 | Manufacturing | http://www.konka.com |
| 000017 | CBC | 深中华A | Shenzhen China Bicycle Company (Holdings) Limited | 31.03.1992 | 302,984,965 | 302,981,008 | Manufacturing | |
| 000018 | Sino Great Wall | *ST神城 | Sino Great Wall Co, ltd. | 16.06.1992 | 1,434,441,780 | 995,889,682 | Construction | http://www.sgwde.com |
| 000019 | SHENLIANGKONGGU | 深粮控股 | Shenzhen Cereals Holdings Co, ltd. | 12.10.1992 | 1,100,785,974 | 416,216,407 | Wholesale & Retail | http://www.slkg1949.com |
| 000020 | HUAFA | 深华发A | Shenzhen Zhongheng Huafa Co, ltd. | 28.04.1992 | 181,165,391 | 181,165,391 | Manufacturing | http://www.hwafa.com.cn |
| 000021 | KAIFA | 深科技 | Shenzhen Kaifa Technology Co, ltd. | 02.02.1994 | 1,471,259,363 | 1,470,706,176 | Manufacturing | http://www.kaifa.cn |
| 000023 | Universe | 深天地A | Shenzhen Universe (Group) Co, ltd. | 29.04.1993 | 138,756,240 | 138,756,240 | Manufacturing | http://www.sztiandi.com |
| 000025 | Tellus | 特力A | Shenzhen Tellus Holding Co, ltd. | 21.06.1993 | 392,778,320 | 392,778,320 | Wholesale & Retail | https://web.archive.org/web/20191012064455/http://www.tellus.cn/ |
| 000026 | Fiyta | 飞亚达A | Fiyta Holdings Ltd. | 03.06.1993 | 361,320,881 | 356,692,290 | Wholesale & Retail | http://www.fiytagroup.com |
| 000027 | SEIC | 深圳能源 | Shenzhne Energy Group Co, ltd. | 03.09.1993 | 3,964,491,597 | 3,964,491,597 | Utilities | http://www.sec.com.cn |
| 000028 | Sinopharm Accord | 国药一致 | China National Accord Medicines Corporation Ltd. | 09.08.1993 | 373,241,383 | 307,744,355 | Wholesale & Retail | http://www.szaccord.com.cn |
| 000029 | SPG | 深深房A | Shenzhen Special Economic Zone Real Estate & Properties (Group) Co, ltd. | 15.09.1993 | 891,660,000 | 891,591,000 | Real estate | http://www.sfjt.com.cn |
| 000030 | Fawer | 富奥股份 | Fawer Automotive Parts Limited Company | 29.09.1993 | 1,762,733,196 | 1,759,880,870 | Manufacturing | |
| 000031 | GrandJoy | 大悦城 | GrandJoy Holdings Group Co, ltd. | 08.10.1993 | 3,925,870,338 | 1,813,722,958 | Real estate | |
| 000032 | SED | 深桑达A | Shenzhen SED Industry Co, ltd. | 28.10.1993 | 413,219,661 | 411,283,660 | Wholesale & Retail | http://www.sedind.com |
| 000034 | Digital China | 神州数码 | Digital China Group Co, ltd | 09.05.1994 | 654,070,434 | 481,119,191 | Wholesale & Retail | http://www.digitalchina.com |
| 000035 | China TIANYING | 中国天楹 | China Tianying Inc. | 08.04.1994 | 2,438,736,365 | 1,281,089,502 | Environmental protection | http://www.ctyi.com.cn |
| 000036 | UDC | 华联控股 | China Union Holdings Ltd. | 17.06.1994 | 1,483,934,025 | 1,475,023,304 | Real estate | http://www.udcgroup.com |
| 000037 | NSRD | 深南电A | Shenzhen Nanshan Power Station Co, ltd. | 01.07.1994 | 338,908,150 | 338,894,011 | Utilities | |
| 000038 | SZCI | 深大通 | Shenzhen Capstone Industrial Co, ltd. | 08.08.1994 | 522,777,419 | 229,220,504 | Business support | http://www.chinadatong.com |
| 000039 | CIMC | 中集集团 | China International Marine Containers (Group) Co, ltd. | 08.04.1994 | 1,523,256,752 | 1,522,406,520 | Manufacturing | http://www.cimc.com |
| 000040 | DXLT | 东旭蓝天 | Tunghsu Azure Renewable Energy Co, ltd. | 08.08.1994 | 1,486,873,870 | 1,060,340,670 | Utilities | http://www.dongxulantian.com |
| 000042 | Centralcon Holding | 中洲控股 | Shenzhen Centralcon Investment Holding Co, ltd | 21.09.1994 | 664,831,139 | 662,149,964 | Real estate | http://www.zztzkg.com |
| 000043 | AVIC Sunda | 中航善达 | AVIC Sunda Holding Company Limited | 28.09.1994 | 666,961,416 | 666,793,416 | Real estate | http://www.avicsunda.com |
| 000045 | STHC | 深纺织A | Shenzhen Textile (Holdings) Co, ltd. | 15.08.1994 | 459,838,429 | 457,016,599 | Manufacturing | http://www.chinasthc.com |
| 000046 | Oceanwide Holdings | 泛海控股 | Oceanwide Holdings Co, ltd. | 12.09.1994 | 5,196,200,656 | 5,175,213,333 | Real estate | http://www.chinaoceanwide.com |
| 000048 | Kondarl | *ST康达 | Shenzhen Kondarl (Group) Co, ltd. | 01.11.1994 | 390,768,671 | 390,707,448 | Manufacturing | http://www.kondarl.com |
| 000049 | Desay Battery | 德赛电池 | Shenzhen Desay Battery Technology Co, ltd. | 20.03.1995 | 207,197,738 | 205,243,738 | Manufacturing | http://www.desaybattery.com |
| 000050 | TIANMA | 深天马A | Tianma Microelectronics Co, ltd. | 15.03.1995 | 2,048,123,051 | 1,828,857,609 | Manufacturing | http://www.tianma.cn |
| 000055 | FANGDA Group | 方大集团 | China Fangda Group Co, ltd. | 15.04.1996 | 679,715,472 | 678,283,904 | Manufacturing | http://www.fangda.com |
| 000056 | WTGJ | 皇庭国际 | Shenzhen Wongtee International Enterprise Co, ltd. | 08.07.1996 | 931,293,708 | 903,733,208 | Business support | http://www.wongtee000056.com |
| 000058 | SEGCL | 深赛格 | Shenzhen SEG Co, ltd. | 26.12.1996 | 989,194,931 | 538,032,603 | Business support | http://www.segcl.com.cn |
| 000059 | HUAJIN Co, ltd. | 华锦股份 | North Huajin Chemical Industries Co, ltd. | 30.01.1997 | 1,599,442,537 | 1,599,439,081 | Manufacturing | http://hjgy.norincogroup.com.cn |
| 000060 | Nonfemet | 中金岭南 | Shenzhen Zhongjin Lingnan Nonfemet Co, ltd. | 23.01.1997 | 3,569,685,327 | 3,568,397,881 | Manufacturing | http://www.nonfemet.com |
| 000061 | SZAP | 农产品 | Shenzhen Agricultural Products Group Co, ltd. | 10.01.1997 | 1,696,964,131 | 1,695,415,483 | Business support | http://www.szap.com |
| 000062 | HUAQIANG Industry | 深圳华强 | Shenzhen Huaqiang Industry Co, ltd. | 30.01.1997 | 1,045,909,322 | 1,044,640,056 | Wholesale & Retail | http://www.szhq000062.com |
| 000063 | ZTE | 中兴通讯 | ZTE Corporation | 18.11.1997 | 3,470,456,173 | 3,470,044,776 | Manufacturing | http://www.zte.com.cn |
| 000065 | Norinco International | 北方国际 | Norinco International Corporation Ltd. | 05.06.1998 | 769,505,410 | 628,943,607 | Construction | http://www.norinco-intl.com |
| 000066 | CGT Group | 中国长城 | China Greatwall Technology Group Co, ltd. | 26.06.1997 | 2,928,182,053 | 2,490,717,309 | Manufacturing | http://www.greatwall.cn |
| 000068 | HUAKONG SEG | 华控赛格 | Shenzhen Huakong SEG Co, ltd. | 11.06.1997 | 1,006,671,464 | 1,006,670,564 | Manufacturing | http://www.huakongseg.com.cn |
| 000069 | OCT Holding | 华侨城A | Shenzhen Overseas Chinese Town Co, ltd. | 10.09.1997 | 8,202,506,415 | 7,016,679,909 | Real estate | http://www.octholding.com |
| 000070 | SDGI | 特发信息 | Shenzhen SDG Information Co, ltd. | 11.05.2000 | 813,326,798 | 791,992,448 | Manufacturing | http://www.sdgi.com.cn |
| 000078 | Neptunus | 海王生物 | Shenzhen Neptunus Bioengineering Co, ltd. | 18.12.1998 | 2,762,583,257 | 2,621,960,808 | Wholesale & Retail | http://www.neptunus.com |
| 000088 | YANTIAN Port | 盐田港 | Shenzhen Yantian Port Holdings Co, ltd. | 28.07.1997 | 1,942,200,000 | 1,942,200,000 | Transportation | http://www.yantian-port.com |
| 000089 | SACL | 深圳机场 | Shenzhen Airport Co, ltd. | 20.04.1998 | 2,050,769,509 | 2,050,769,509 | Transportation | https://web.archive.org/web/20050326032642/http://www.szairport.com/ |
| 000090 | Tagen | 天健集团 | Shenzhen Tagen Group Co, ltd. | 21.07.1999 | 1,868,545,434 | 1,868,415,681 | Construction | http://www.tagen.cn |
| 000096 | GJNY | 广聚能源 | Shenzhen Guangju Energy Co, ltd. | 24.07.2000 | 528,000,000 | 510,848,000 | Wholesale & Retail | http://www.gj000096.com |
| 000099 | COHC | 中信海直 | CITIC Offshore Helicopter Co, ltd. | 31.07.2000 | 606,070,420 | 606,070,420 | Transportation | http://www.cohc.citic |

== 000100–000499 ==
| Code | Short-name | | Full name | Listing date | Issued capital | Negotiable capital | Industry | Http |
| Code | English | Chinese | Full name | Listing date | Issued capital | Negotiable capital | Industry | Http |
|---|---|---|---|---|---|---|---|---|
| 000100 | TCL | TCL集团 | TCL Corporation | 30.01.2004 | 13,549,648,507 | 12,660,673,739 | Manufacturing | http://www.tcl.com |
| 000150 | YIHUA Healthcare | 宜华健康 | Yihua Healthcare Co, ltd | 07.08.2000 | 877,697,557 | 805,990,242 | Public health | http://www.yihuahealth.com |
| 000151 | Complant-Ltd | 中成股份 | China National Complete Plant Import & Export Corporation Limited | 06.09.2000 | 295,980,000 | 266,540,217 | Wholesale & Retail | http://www.complant-ltd.com |
| 000153 | FENGYUAN Pharmaceutical | 丰原药业 | Anhui Fengyuan Pharmaceutical Co, ltd. | 20.09.2000 | 312,141,230 | 311,977,230 | Manufacturing | http://www.bbcayy.com |
| 000155 | CNDL | 川能动力 | Sichuan New Energy Power Company Limited | 26.09.2000 | 1,270,000,000 | 1,270,000,000 | Manufacturing | http://cndl.scnyw.com |
| 000156 | Wasu | 华数传媒 | Wasu Media Holding Co, ltd. | 06.09.2000 | 1,433,351,902 | 1,280,295,337 | Media | https://web.archive.org/web/20160712040419/http://www.wasu.com/ |
| 000157 | Zoomlion Co, ltd. | 中联重科 | Zoomlion Heavy Industry Science and Technology Co, ltd. | 12.10.2000 | 6,479,529,980 | 6,349,876,602 | Manufacturing | http://www.zoomlion.com |
| 000158 | CSBM | 常山北明 | Shijiazhuang Changshan Beiming Technology Co, ltd. | 24.07.2000 | 1,652,874,961 | 1,624,230,380 | IT | http://www.csbmkj.com |
| 000159 | XIIC | 国际实业 | Xinjiang International Industry Co, ltd. | 26.09.2000 | 480,685,993 | 480,651,118 | Wholesale & Retail | http://www.xjgjsy.com |
| 000166 | SWHY | 申万宏源 | Shenwan Hongyuan Group Co, ltd. | 26.01.2015 | 22,535,944,560 | 22,534,414,205 | Finance | http://www.swhygh.com |
| 000301 | Eastern SHENGHONG | 东方盛虹 | Jiangsu Eastern Shenghong Co, ltd. | 29.05.2000 | 4,029,053,222 | 1,218,236,445 | Manufacturing | http://www.cesm.com.cn |
| 000333 | Midea Group | 美的集团 | Midea Group Co, ltd. | 18.09.2013 | 6,962,627,009 | 6,797,231,996 | Manufacturing | http://www.midea.com |
| 000338 | WEICHAI Power | 潍柴动力 | Weichai Power Co, ltd. | 30.04.2007 | 5,990,833,895 | 4,245,035,750 | Manufacturing | http://www.weichaipower.com |
| 000400 | XJEC | 许继电气 | XJ Electric Co, ltd. | 18.04.1997 | 1,008,327,309 | 1,008,180,305 | Manufacturing | http://www.xjgc.com |
| 000401 | JIDONG Cement | 冀东水泥 | Tangshan Jidong Cement Co, ltd. | 14.06.1996 | 1,347,522,914 | 1,347,214,601 | Manufacturing | http://www.jdsn.com.cn |
| 000402 | Financial Street | 金融街 | Financial Street Holdings Co, ltd. | 26.06.1996 | 2,988,929,907 | 2,987,631,546 | Real estate | http://www.jrjkg.com |
| 000403 | ZXB&C | 振兴生化 | Zhenxing Biopharmaceutical & Chemical Co, ltd. | 28.06.1996 | 272,577,599 | 271,404,099 | Manufacturing | |
| 000404 | CHHY | 长虹华意 | Changhong Huayi Compressor Co, ltd. | 19.06.1996 | 695,995,979 | 694,622,798 | Manufacturing | http://www.hua-yi.cn |
| 000407 | SDSL | 胜利股份 | Shandong Shengli Co, ltd. | 03.07.1996 | 880,084,656 | 875,743,830 | Utilities | http://www.vicome.com |
| 000408 | ZANGGE Holding | 藏格控股 | Zangge Holding Company Limited | 28.06.1996 | 1,993,779,522 | 464,481,621 | Manufacturing | |
| 000409 | SDGM | ST地矿 | Shandong Geo-Mineral Co, ltd. | 27.06.1996 | 510,931,158 | 405,631,244 | Conglomerates | http://www.sddkgf.com |
| 000410 | SMTCL | *ST沈机 | Shenyang Machine Tool Co, ltd. | 18.07.1996 | 765,470,884 | 740,349,384 | Manufacturing | http://www.smtcl.com |
| 000411 | Int'l Group | 英特集团 | Zhejiang Int'l Group Co, ltd. | 16.07.1996 | 248,939,935 | 207,321,071 | Wholesale & Retail | http://www.intmedic.com |
| 000413 | DONGXU Optoelectronic | 东旭光电 | Tunghsu Optoelectronic Technology Co, ltd. | 25.09.1996 | 5,480,250,117 | 4,864,130,314 | Manufacturing | http://www.dongxuguangdian.com.cn |
| 000415 | BOHAI Leasing | 渤海租赁 | Bohai Leasing Co, ltd. | 16.07.1996 | 6,184,521,282 | 3,547,396,604 | Business support | http://www.bohaileasing.com |
| 000416 | MINSHENG Holdings | 民生控股 | Minsheng Holdings Co, ltd. | 19.07.1996 | 531,871,494 | 531,641,098 | Finance | http://www.mskg.com.cn |
| 000417 | HFBH | 合肥百货 | Hefei Department Store Group Co, ltd. | 12.08.1996 | 779,884,200 | 779,027,451 | Wholesale & Retail | http://www.hfbh.com.cn |
| 000419 | TONGCHENG | 通程控股 | Changsha Tongcheng Holdings Co, ltd. | 16.08.1996 | 543,582,655 | 543,299,845 | Wholesale & Retail | http://www.e-tongcheng.com |
| 000420 | JLCF | 吉林化纤 | Jilin Chemical Fibre Co, ltd. | 02.08.1996 | 1,970,706,656 | 1,850,480,524 | Manufacturing | http://www.jlhxjt.com |
| 000421 | NJ Public Utilities | 南京公用 | Nanjing Public Utilities Development Co, ltd. | 06.08.1996 | 572,646,934 | 572,646,934 | Utilities | http://www.zhong-bei.com |
| 000422 | HBYH | ST宜化 | Hubei Yihua Chemical Industry Co, ltd. | 15.08.1996 | 897,866,712 | 897,812,984 | Manufacturing | http://www.hbyh.cn |
| 000423 | DEEJ | 东阿阿胶 | Dong-E-E-Jiao Co, ltd. | 29.07.1996 | 654,021,537 | 653,867,313 | Manufacturing | http://www.dongeejiao.com |
| 000425 | XCMG | 徐工机械 | XCMG Construction Machinery Co, ltd. | 28.08.1996 | 7,833,668,430 | 6,993,974,965 | Manufacturing | http://www.xcmg.com |
| 000426 | IMXM | 兴业矿业 | Inner Mongolia Xingye Mining Co, ltd. | 28.08.1996 | 1,837,192,219 | 1,298,967,555 | Mining | http://www.nmxyky.com |
| 000428 | HUATIAN Hotel | 华天酒店 | Huatian Hotel Group Co, ltd. | 08.08.1996 | 1,018,926,000 | 1,018,882,150 | Hotels & Catering | https://web.archive.org/web/20180126101323/http://www.huatian-hotel.com/ |
| 000429 | GPED | 粤高速A | Guangdong Provincial Expressway Development Co, ltd. | 20.02.1998 | 1,742,056,126 | 1,302,772,793 | Transportation | |
| 000430 | ZTDC | 张家界 | Zhangjiajie Tourism Group Co, ltd | 29.08.1996 | 404,817,686 | 331,738,800 | Environmental protection | http://www.zjjlyjt.com |
| 000488 | SCPH | 晨鸣纸业 | Shandong Chenming Paper Holdings Co, ltd. | 20.11.2000 | 1,669,917,684 | 1,656,525,378 | Manufacturing | http://www.chenmingpaper.com |
| 000498 | SHANDONG Road & Bridge | 山东路桥 | Shandong Hi-Speed Road & Bridge Co, ltd. | 09.06.1997 | 1,120,139,063 | 1,120,090,313 | Construction | http://www.sdlqgf.com |

== 000500–000599 ==
| Code | Short-name | | Full name | Listing date | Issued capital | Negotiable capital | Industry | Http |
| Code | English | Chinese | Full name | Listing date | Issued capital | Negotiable capital | Industry | Http |
|---|---|---|---|---|---|---|---|---|
| 000501 | WUSHANG Group | 鄂武商A | Wuhan Department Store Group Co, ltd. | 20.11.1992 | 768,992,731 | 767,757,255 | Wholesale & Retail | http://www.wushang.com.cn |
| 000502 | LJH | 绿景控股 | Lvjing Holding Co, ltd. | 23.11.1992 | 184,819,607 | 183,346,957 | Real estate | http://www.000502.cn |
| 000503 | China Reform Health | 国新健康 | China Reform Health Management and Services Group Co, ltd. | 30.11.1992 | 898,822,204 | 898,822,204 | IT | http://www.crhms.cn |
| 000504 | CMI | *ST生物 | Nanhua Bio-Medicine Co, ltd. | 08.12.1992 | 311,573,901 | 310,673,201 | Research & Development | http://www.nhbiogruop.com |
| 000505 | JLKG | 京粮控股 | Hainan Jingliang Holdings Co, ltd. | 21.12.1992 | 620,815,364 | 406,127,806 | Manufacturing | |
| 000506 | ZRC | 中润资源 | Zhongrun Resources Investment Corporation | 12.03.1992 | 929,017,761 | 928,670,961 | Mining | http://www.sdzr.com |
| 000507 | ZPH | 珠海港 | Zhuhai Port Co, ltd. | 26.03.1993 | 930,424,895 | 772,143,777 | Transportation | http://www.0507.com.cn |
| 000509 | Tony & Hasu | 华塑控股 | Huasu Holdings Co, ltd. | 07.05.1993 | 825,483,117 | 825,479,873 | Manufacturing | |
| 000510 | XINJINLU | 新金路 | Sichuan Xinjinlu Group Co, ltd. | 07.05.1993 | 609,182,254 | 549,479,157 | Manufacturing | http://www.jinlugroup.cn |
| 000513 | Livzon Group | 丽珠集团 | Livzon Pharmaceutical Group Inc. | 28.10.1993 | 614,898,458 | 595,686,107 | Manufacturing | http://www.livzon.com.cn |
| 000514 | YUKAIFA | 渝开发 | Chongqing Yukaifa Co, ltd. | 12.07.1993 | 843,770,965 | 843,770,965 | Real estate | http://www.cqukf.com |
| 000516 | IMIC | 国际医学 | Xi'an International Medical Investment Company Limited | 09.08.1993 | 1,971,049,302 | 1,929,001,640 | Public health | http://www.000516.cn |
| 000517 | RONGAN Property | 荣安地产 | Rongan Property Co, ltd. | 06.08.1993 | 3,183,922,485 | 2,473,207,316 | Real estate | http://www.rongan.com.cn |
| 000518 | JSSH | 四环生物 | Jiangsu Sihuan Bioengineering Co, ltd. | 08.09.1993 | 1,029,556,222 | 1,029,556,222 | Manufacturing | http://www.000518shsw.com |
| 000519 | Norinco Red Arrow | 中兵红箭 | North Industries Group Red Arrow Co, ltd. | 08.10.1993 | 1,392,558,982 | 932,647,561 | Manufacturing | |
| 000520 | CH Phoenix | 长航凤凰 | Changjiang Shipping Group Phoenix Co, ltd. | 25.10.1993 | 1,012,083,455 | 1,012,072,205 | Transportation | http://zgchfh.sinotrans-csc.com |
| 000521 | CHML | 长虹美菱 | Changhong Meiling Co, ltd. | 18.10.1993 | 881,733,881 | 802,212,775 | Manufacturing | http://www.meiling.com |
| 000523 | Lonkey | 广州浪奇 | Lonkey Industrial Co, ltd. Guangzhou | 08.11.1993 | 627,533,125 | 626,902,366 | Manufacturing | http://www.lonkey.com.cn |
| 000524 | LN Holdings | 岭南控股 | Guangzhou Lingnan Group Holdings Company Limited | 18.11.1993 | 670,208,597 | 272,301,442 | Hotels & Catering | http://www.gzlnholdings.com |
| 000525 | RedSun | 红太阳 | Nanjing Red Sun Co, ltd. | 28.10.1993 | 580,772,873 | 574,398,865 | Manufacturing | http://www.chinaredsun.com |
| 000526 | Unigroup XUE | 紫光学大 | Xiamen Unigroup XUE Co, ltd. | 01.11.1993 | 96,195,107 | 96,195,107 | Education | |
| 000528 | LIUGONG | 柳工 | Guangxi Liugong Machinery Co, ltd. | 18.11.1993 | 1,476,111,376 | 1,462,622,772 | Manufacturing | http://www.liugong.com |
| 000529 | GUANGHONG Holdings | 广弘控股 | Guangdong Guanghong Holdings Co, ltd. | 18.11.1993 | 583,790,330 | 569,884,377 | Manufacturing | http://www.ghkg000529.com |
| 000530 | DRC | 大冷股份 | Dalian Refrigeration Co, ltd. | 08.12.1993 | 601,712,507 | 598,924,878 | Manufacturing | http://www.bingshan.com |
| 000531 | HENGYUN Group | 穗恒运A | Guangzhou Hengyun Enterprises Holding Co, ltd. | 06.01.1994 | 685,082,820 | 685,082,820 | Utilities | http://www.hengyun.com.cn |
| 000532 | HUAJIN Capital | 华金资本 | Zhuhai Huajin Capital Co, ltd. | 03.01.1994 | 344,708,340 | 343,483,446 | Conglomerates | http://www.huajinct.com |
| 000533 | SHUNNA | 顺钠电气 | Guangdong Shunna Electric Co, ltd. | 03.01.1994 | 690,816,000 | 684,902,400 | Manufacturing | http://www.shunna.com.cn |
| 000534 | Wedge Corporation | 万泽股份 | Wedge Industrial Co, ltd. | 10.01.1994 | 491,785,096 | 491,507,596 | Manufacturing | http://www.wedge.com.cn |
| 000536 | CPT Tech Group | 华映科技 | CPT Technology (Group) Co, ltd. | 26.11.1993 | 2,766,032,803 | 2,763,081,622 | Manufacturing | http://www.cpttg.com |
| 000537 | GYFZ | 广宇发展 | Tianjin Guangyu Development Co, ltd. | 10.12.1993 | 1,862,520,720 | 512,717,581 | Real estate | http://www.gyfz000537.com |
| 000538 | YUNNAN BAIYAO | 云南白药 | Yunnan Baiyao Group Co, ltd. | 15.12.1993 | 1,277,403,317 | 602,157,239 | Manufacturing | http://www.yunnanbaiyao.com.cn |
| 000539 | GED | 粤电力A | Guangdong Electric Power Development Co, ltd. | 26.11.1993 | 4,451,875,986 | 2,553,907,040 | Utilities | https://web.archive.org/web/20050207164557/http://www.ged.com.cn/ |
| 000540 | ZHONGTIAN | 中天金融 | Zhongtian Financial Group Company Limited | 02.02.1994 | 7,005,254,679 | 6,500,659,737 | Real estate | http://www.ztfgroup.com |
| 000541 | FSL | 佛山照明 | Foshan Electrical and Lighting Co, ltd. | 23.11.1993 | 1,077,274,404 | 1,072,071,544 | Manufacturing | http://www.chinafsl.com |
| 000543 | Wenergy Co, ltd. | 皖能电力 | Anhui Wenenrgy Co, ltd. | 20.12.1993 | 2,266,863,331 | 1,790,395,978 | Utilities | http://www.wenergy.cn |
| 000544 | ZHONGYUAN En-Prot | 中原环保 | Central Plains Environment Protection Co, ltd. | 08.12.1993 | 974,684,488 | 974,684,488 | Utilities | http://www.cpepgc.com |
| 000545 | JPTY | 金浦钛业 | Gpro Titanium Industry Co, ltd. | 15.12.1993 | 986,833,096 | 959,403,096 | Manufacturing | |
| 000546 | JYC | 金圆股份 | Jinyuan EP Co, ltd. | 15.12.1993 | 714,644,396 | 667,933,095 | Environmental protection | http://www.jysn.com |
| 000547 | Addsino | 航天发展 | Addsino Co, ltd. | 30.11.1993 | 1,605,678,881 | 1,101,872,269 | Manufacturing | http://www.casic-addsino.com |
| 000548 | HIG | 湖南投资 | Hunan Investment Group Co, ltd. | 20.12.1993 | 499,215,811 | 499,169,124 | Transportation | http://www.hntz.com.cn |
| 000550 | JMC | 江铃汽车 | Jiangling Motors Co, ltd. | 01.12.1993 | 519,214,000 | 518,427,085 | Manufacturing | http://www.jmc.com.cn |
| 000551 | CTS | 创元科技 | Create Technology & Science Co, ltd. | 06.01.1994 | 400,080,405 | 400,080,405 | Conglomerates | http://www.000551.cn |
| 000552 | JINGYUAN CE | 靖远煤电 | Gansu Jingyuan Coal Industry and Electricity Power Co, ltd. | 06.01.1994 | 2,286,971,050 | 2,283,741,262 | Mining | http://www.jymdgs.com |
| 000553 | Adama A | 安道麦A | Adama Ltd. | 03.12.1993 | 2,279,504,241 | 468,616,702 | Manufacturing | http://www.adama.com |
| 000554 | TSPC | 泰山石油 | Sinopec Shandong Taishan Petroleum Co, ltd. | 15.12.1993 | 480,793,318 | 362,649,710 | Wholesale & Retail | |
| 000555 | Techo Telecom | 神州信息 | Digital China Information Service Company Ltd. | 08.04.1994 | 963,431,273 | 941,084,909 | IT | http://www.dcits.com |
| 000557 | Western Venture | 西部创业 | Ningxia Western Venture Industrial Co, ltd. | 17.06.1994 | 1,458,374,735 | 585,245,214 | Transportation | http://www.xbcy.nx.cn |
| 000558 | Lander | 莱茵体育 | Lander Sports Development Co, ltd. | 09.05.1994 | 1,289,223,949 | 1,288,352,640 | Real estate | http://www.lander.com.cn |
| 000559 | WXQC | 万向钱潮 | Wanxiang Qianchao Co, ltd. | 10.01.1994 | 2,753,159,454 | 2,753,149,374 | Manufacturing | http://www.wxqc.com.cn |
| 000560 | 5I5J | 我爱我家 | 5I5J Holding Group Co, ltd. | 02.02.1994 | 2,355,500,851 | 1,797,750,374 | Real estate | http://000560.5i5j.com |
| 000561 | FHEC | 烽火电子 | Shaanxi Fenghuo Electronics Co, ltd. | 09.05.1994 | 604,692,321 | 593,981,214 | Manufacturing | http://www.fenghuo.cn |
| 000563 | SITI | 陕国投A | Shaanxi International Trust Co, ltd. | 10.01.1994 | 3,964,012,846 | 3,964,012,846 | Finance | http://www.siti.com.cn |
| 000564 | Ccoop Group | 供销大集 | Ccoop Group Co, ltd. | 10.01.1994 | 6,007,828,831 | 2,005,895,931 | Wholesale & Retail | http://www.gongxiaodaji.com |
| 000565 | CHQSXP | 渝三峡A | Chongqing Sanxia Paints Co, ltd. | 08.04.1994 | 433,592,220 | 433,592,220 | Manufacturing | http://www.sanxia.com |
| 000566 | HAINAN HAIYAO | 海南海药 | Hainan Haiyao Co, ltd. | 25.05.1994 | 1,335,979,264 | 1,203,496,461 | Manufacturing | http://www.haiyao.com.cn |
| 000567 | HDI | 海德股份 | Hainan Haide Industry Co, ltd. | 25.05.1994 | 641,138,926 | 217,786,301 | Finance | http://www.000567.com |
| 000568 | LUZHOU LAO JIAO | 泸州老窖 | Luzhou Lao Jiao Co, ltd. | 09.05.1994 | 1,464,752,476 | 1,460,105,295 | Manufacturing | http://www.lzlj.com.cn |
| 000570 | CHANGCHAI | 苏常柴A | Changchai Company Limited | 01.07.1994 | 411,374,326 | 411,374,326 | Manufacturing | http://www.changchai.com.cn |
| 000571 | Sundiro Holding | *ST大洲 | Sundiro Holding Co, ltd. | 25.05.1994 | 814,064,000 | 806,543,720 | Conglomerates | http://www.sundiro.com |
| 000572 | HAIMA Automobile | *ST海马 | Haima Automobile Co, ltd. | 08.08.1994 | 1,644,636,426 | 1,642,155,224 | Manufacturing | http://www.haima.com |
| 000573 | Winnerway | 粤宏远A | Dongguan Winnerway Industrial Zone Co, ltd. | 15.08.1994 | 648,730,604 | 629,098,003 | Real estate | http://www.winnerway.com.cn |
| 000576 | JSCC | 广东甘化 | Jiangmen Sugar Cane Chemical Factory (Group) Co, ltd. | 07.09.1994 | 442,861,324 | 427,984,418 | Manufacturing | http://www.gdganhua.com |
| 000581 | WEIFU High-Tech | 威孚高科 | Weifu High-Technology Group Co, ltd. | 24.09.1998 | 836,570,570 | 836,490,490 | Manufacturing | http://www.weifu.com.cn |
| 000582 | BBWPort | 北部湾港 | Beibu Gulf Port Co, ltd. | 02.11.1995 | 1,634,616,854 | 263,175,194 | Transportation | http://www.bbwport.cn |
| 000584 | HGZN | 哈工智能 | Jiangsu Hagong Intelligent Robot Co, ltd. | 28.11.1995 | 613,324,339 | 598,315,925 | Manufacturing | http://www.hgzngroup.com |
| 000585 | NEE | ST东电 | Northeast Electric Development Company Limited | 13.12.1995 | 615,420,000 | 609,420,978 | Manufacturing | |
| 000586 | HYC | 汇源通信 | Sichuan Huiyuan Optical Communications Co, ltd. | 20.12.1995 | 193,440,000 | 193,440,000 | Manufacturing | http://www.schy.com.cn |
| 000587 | JZCH | 金洲慈航 | Jinzhou Cihang Group Co, ltd. | 25.04.1996 | 2,123,749,330 | 1,213,011,850 | Manufacturing | https://web.archive.org/web/20120527201120/http://www.goldzb.com/ |
| 000589 | GZT | 贵州轮胎 | Guizhou Tyre Co, ltd. | 08.03.1996 | 775,464,304 | 775,464,304 | Manufacturing | http://www.gztyre.com |
| 000590 | Tus-GUHAN | 启迪古汉 | Tus-Guhan Group Corp, ltd. | 19.01.1996 | 239,471,267 | 223,236,227 | Manufacturing | http://www.guhan.com |
| 000591 | TYN | 太阳能 | CECEP Solar Energy Co, ltd. | 08.02.1996 | 3,007,098,032 | 2,037,098,929 | Utilities | http://www.cecsec.cn |
| 000592 | PINGTAN Development | 平潭发展 | Zhongfu Straits (Pingtan) Development Company Limited | 27.03.1996 | 1,931,780,892 | 1,913,824,415 | Agriculture | http://www.000592.com |
| 000593 | DATONG Gas | 大通燃气 | Sichuan Datong Gas Development Co, ltd. | 12.03.1996 | 358,631,009 | 358,483,169 | Utilities | http://www.dtrq.com |
| 000595 | BAOTA Industry | 宝塔实业 | Baota Industry Co, ltd. | 19.04.1996 | 764,279,250 | 752,203,225 | Manufacturing | http://www.nxz.com.cn |
| 000596 | GUJING Distillery | 古井贡酒 | Anhui Gujing Distillery Co, ltd. | 27.09.1996 | 383,600,000 | 383,600,000 | Manufacturing | http://www.gujing.com |
| 000597 | NEP | 东北制药 | Northeast Pharmaceutical Group Co, ltd. | 23.05.1996 | 904,726,630 | 817,227,397 | Manufacturing | http://www.nepharm.com.cn |
| 000598 | XREC | 兴蓉环境 | Chengdu Xingrong Environmental Co, ltd. | 29.05.1996 | 2,986,218,602 | 2,986,218,602 | Utilities | http://www.cdxrec.com |
| 000599 | DoubleStar | 青岛双星 | Qingdao DoubleStar Co, ltd. | 30.04.1996 | 828,503,191 | 767,691,542 | Manufacturing | http://www.doublestar.com.cn |

== 000600–000699 ==
| Code | Short-name | | Full name | Listing date | Issued capital | Negotiable capital | Industry | Http |
| Code | English | Chinese | Full name | Listing date | Issued capital | Negotiable capital | Industry | Http |
|---|---|---|---|---|---|---|---|---|
| 000600 | JEI | 建投能源 | Jointo Energy Investment Co, ltd., Hebei | 06.06.1996 | 1,791,626,376 | 1,090,044,126 | Utilities | http://www.jei.com.cn |
| 000601 | SHAONENG | 韶能股份 | Guangdong Shaoneng Group Co, ltd. | 30.08.1996 | 1,080,551,669 | 1,079,832,557 | Utilities | http://www.shaoneng.com.cn |
| 000603 | SDM | 盛达矿业 | Shengda Mining Co, ltd. | 23.08.1996 | 689,969,346 | 578,804,715 | Mining | http://www.sdjt.com |
| 000605 | BHWI | 渤海股份 | Bohai Water Industry Co, ltd. | 13.09.1996 | 352,658,600 | 272,987,492 | Utilities | http://www.bohai-water.com |
| 000606 | SHUNLIBAN | 顺利办 | Shunliban Information Service Co, ltd. | 04.10.1996 | 765,799,353 | 707,201,606 | IT | http://www.shunliban.com |
| 000607 | HUAMEI Holding | 华媒控股 | Zhejiang Huamei Holding Co, ltd. | 30.08.1996 | 1,017,698,410 | 884,859,969 | Media | http://www.000607.cn |
| 000608 | YANGGUANG | 阳光股份 | Yangguang Co, ltd. | 19.09.1996 | 749,913,309 | 749,801,859 | Real estate | http://www.yangguangxinye.com |
| 000609 | Zodi Investment | 中迪投资 | Beijing Zodi Investment Co, ltd. | 10.10.1996 | 299,265,522 | 291,973,722 | Conglomerates | |
| 000610 | XATC | 西安旅游 | Xi'an Tourism Co, ltd. | 26.09.1996 | 236,747,901 | 235,288,519 | Environmental protection | http://www.xatourism.com |
| 000611 | TSD | *ST天首 | Inner Mongolia Tianshou Technology & Development Co, ltd. | 08.10.1996 | 337,822,022 | 319,347,925 | Manufacturing | |
| 000612 | JZWF AL | 焦作万方 | Jiaozuo Wanfang Aluminum Manufacturing Co, ltd. | 26.09.1996 | 1,192,199,394 | 1,191,057,144 | Manufacturing | http://www.jzwfly.cn |
| 000613 | DADONGHAI | 大东海A | Hainan Dadonghai Tourism Centre (Holdings) Co, ltd. | 28.01.1997 | 276,100,000 | 265,876,600 | Hotel & Catering | |
| 000615 | KingHand | 京汉股份 | Kinghand Industrial Investment Group Co, ltd. | 16.10.1996 | 782,307,677 | 643,702,847 | Real estate | http://www.000615.com.cn |
| 000616 | HNA Investment | 海航投资 | HNA Investment Group Co, ltd. | 08.11.1996 | 1,430,234,425 | 1,430,234,425 | Real estate | http://www.hnainvestment.com |
| 000617 | CNPCCCL | 中油资本 | CNPC Capital Company Limited | 22.10.1996 | 9,030,056,485 | 287,539,200 | Finance | http://www.cnpccapital.cn |
| 000619 | Conch Profiles | 海螺型材 | Wuhu Conch Profiles and Science Co, ltd. | 23.10.1996 | 360,000,000 | 360,000,000 | Manufacturing | http://pvc.conch.cn |
| 000620 | MacroLink | 新华联 | MacroLink Culturaltainment Investment Co, ltd. | 29.10.1996 | 1,896,690,420 | 1,896,606,945 | Real estate | http://www.xhlbdc.com |
| 000622 | HLSY | 恒立实业 | Hengli Industrial Development Group Co, ltd. | 07.11.1996 | 425,226,000 | 425,226,000 | Manufacturing | http://www.hlsyfzjt.com |
| 000623 | JLAD | 吉林敖东 | Jilin Aodong Pharmaceutical Group Co, ltd. | 28.10.1996 | 1,163,032,535 | 1,142,040,102 | Manufacturing | http://www.jlaod.com |
| 000625 | Changan Automobile | 长安汽车 | Chongqing Changan Automobile Company Limited | 10.06.1997 | 3,900,662,369 | 3,900,643,369 | Manufacturing | http://www.changan.com.cn |
| 000626 | Grand Holding | 远大控股 | Grand Investment Holding Co, ltd. | 28.11.1996 | 542,874,902 | 463,946,400 | Wholesale & Retail | http://www.grand-holding.cn |
| 000627 | Biocause Pharmacy | 天茂集团 | Hubei Biocause Pharmaceutical Co, ltd. | 12.11.1996 | 4,940,629,165 | 4,303,129,165 | Manufacturing | http://www.biocause.com |
| 000628 | Hi-Tech Development | 高新发展 | Chengdu Hi-Tech Development Group Co, ltd. | 18.11.1996 | 311,480,000 | 187,980,340 | Construction | http://www.cdgxfz.com |
| 000629 | PGVT | 攀钢钒钛 | Pangang Group Vanadium Titanium & Resources Co, ltd. | 15.11.1996 | 8,589,746,202 | 4,767,139,025 | Manufacturing | http://www.pgvt.cn |
| 000630 | TLYS | 铜陵有色 | Tongling Nonferrous Metals Group Co, ltd. | 20.11.1996 | 10,526,533,308 | 9,560,545,753 | Manufacturing | http://www.tlys.cn |
| 000631 | SFHY | 顺发恒业 | Shunfa Hengye Corporation | 22.11.1996 | 2,432,519,168 | 2,432,519,168 | Real estate | http://www.sfhy.cn |
| 000632 | SANMU Group | 三木集团 | Fujian Sanmu Group Co, ltd. | 21.11.1996 | 465,519,570 | 465,481,606 | Wholesale & Retail | http://www.san-mu.com |
| 000633 | HJInv | 合金投资 | Xinjiang Hejin Holding Co, ltd. | 12.11.1996 | 385,106,373 | 385,104,123 | Manufacturing | http://www.xjhjtz.net |
| 000635 | YLT | 英力特 | Ningxia Yinglite Chemicals Co, ltd. | 20.11.1996 | 303,087,602 | 303,087,602 | Manufacturing | |
| 000636 | FENGHUA | 风华高科 | Guangdong Fenghua Advanced Technology (Holding) Co, ltd. | 29.11.1996 | 895,233,111 | 895,203,111 | Manufacturing | http://www.china-fenghua.com |
| 000637 | MPCSH | 茂化实华 | Maoming Petrol-Chemical Shihua Co, ltd. | 14.11.1996 | 519,875,356 | 366,494,967 | Manufacturing | http://www.mhsh0637.com.cn |
| 000638 | Vanfund | 万方发展 | Vanfund Urban Investment & Development Co, ltd. | 26.11.1996 | 309,400,000 | 308,159,050 | IT | |
| 000639 | XIWANG | 西王食品 | Xiwang Foodstuffs Co, ltd. | 26.11.1996 | 1,079,428,095 | 1,076,348,725 | Manufacturing | http://www.xwsp.cc |
| 000650 | RENHE Pharmacy | 仁和药业 | Renhe Pharmacy Co, ltd. | 10.12.1996 | 1,238,340,076 | 1,180,393,145 | Manufacturing | http://www.renheyaoye.com |
| 000651 | Gree | 格力电器 | Gree Electric Appliances Inc. of Zhuhai Co, ltd. | 18.11.1996 | 6,015,730,878 | 5,969,931,253 | Manufacturing | http://www.gree.com.cn |
| 000652 | TEDA | 泰达股份 | Tianjin TEDA Co, ltd. | 28.11.1996 | 1,475,573,852 | 1,474,125,684 | Wholesale & Retail | https://web.archive.org/web/20081120014603/http://www.tedastock.com/ |
| 000655 | JINLING Mining | 金岭矿业 | Shandong Jinling Mining Co, ltd. | 28.11.1996 | 595,340,230 | 595,340,230 | Mining | http://www.sdjljx.cn |
| 000656 | JINKE Co, ltd. | 金科股份 | Jinke Property Group Co, ltd. | 28.11.1996 | 5,339,715,816 | 5,247,924,924 | Real estate | http://www.jinke.com |
| 000657 | China Tungsten Hightech | 中钨高新 | China Tungsten and Hightech Materials Co, ltd. | 05.12.1996 | 880,116,529 | 773,520,517 | Manufacturing | http://www.minmetalstungsten.com |
| 000659 | ZHUHAI ZHONGFU | 珠海中富 | Zhuhai Zhongfu Enterprise Co, ltd. | 03.12.1996 | 1,285,702,520 | 1,285,702,520 | Manufacturing | http://www.zhongfu.com.cn |
| 000661 | CCHN | 长春高新 | Changchun High & New Technology Industry (Group) Inc. | 18.12.1996 | 170,112,265 | 170,022,095 | Manufacturing | http://www.cchn.com.cn |
| 000662 | Teamax | 天夏智慧 | Teamax Smart City Technology Corporation Limited | 16.12.1996 | 1,093,097,734 | 1,093,009,980 | IT | http://www.txgis.com |
| 000663 | YONGAN Forestry | 永安林业 | Fujian Yongan Forestry (Group) Joint-Stock Co, ltd. | 06.12.1996 | 336,683,929 | 246,214,744 | Manufacturing | http://www.yonglin.com |
| 000665 | HBBTN | 湖北广电 | Hubei Radio & Television Information Network Co, ltd. | 10.12.1996 | 963,571,751 | 963,493,946 | Media | https://web.archive.org/web/20190611215208/http://hrtn.net/ |
| 000666 | JWTM | 经纬纺机 | Jingwei Textile Machinery Co, ltd. | 10.12.1996 | 523,330,000 | 293,518,766 | Finance | http://www.jwgf.com |
| 000667 | Myhome | 美好置业 | Myhome Real Estate Development Group Co, ltd. | 05.12.1996 | 2,466,988,633 | 2,447,314,632 | Real estate | http://www.000667.com |
| 000668 | RONG FENG Holding | 荣丰控股 | Rongfeng Holding Group Co, ltd. | 10.12.1996 | 146,841,890 | 146,688,393 | Real estate | http://www.rongfengholding.com |
| 000669 | JHG | 金鸿控股 | Jinhong Holding Group Co, ltd. | 10.12.1996 | 680,408,797 | 680,408,797 | Utilities | |
| 000670 | Infotmic | *ST盈方 | Infomtic Co, ltd. | 17.12.1996 | 816,627,360 | 600,670,732 | Manufacturing | http://www.infotm.com |
| 000671 | Sunshine City | 阳光城 | Yango Group Co, ltd. | 18.12.1996 | 4,050,154,815 | 3,971,969,618 | Real estate | http://www.yango.com.cn |
| 000672 | TCJT | 上峰水泥 | Gansu Shangfeng Cement Co, ltd. | 18.12.1996 | 813,619,871 | 813,584,321 | Manufacturing | http://www.sfsn.cn |
| 000673 | SLI | 当代东方 | Lead Eastern Investment Co, ltd. | 24.01.1997 | 791,550,442 | 789,510,358 | Media | http://www.sz000673.com |
| 000676 | Genimous Technology | 智度股份 | Genimous Technology Co, ltd. | 24.12.1996 | 1,326,000,097 | 653,837,351 | IT | http://www.genimous.com |
| 000677 | Helon | 恒天海龙 | CHTC Helon Co, ltd. | 26.12.1996 | 863,977,948 | 863,977,948 | Manufacturing | http://www.helon.cn |
| 000678 | XY Bearing | 襄阳轴承 | Xiangyang Automobile Bearing Co, ltd. | 06.01.1997 | 459,611,797 | 459,611,797 | Manufacturing | http://www.zxy.com.cn |
| 000679 | DFGC | 大连友谊 | Dalian Friendship (Group) Co, ltd. | 24.01.1997 | 356,400,000 | 356,350,622 | Wholesale & Retail | http://www.sz000679.com |
| 000680 | SHANTUI | 山推股份 | Shantui Construction Machinery Co, ltd. | 22.01.1997 | 1,240,787,611 | 1,056,929,932 | Manufacturing | http://www.shantui.com |
| 000681 | VCG | 视觉中国 | Visual China Group Co, ltd. | 21.01.1997 | 700,577,436 | 661,177,568 | Media | http://www.vcg.com |
| 000682 | DONGFANG Electronics | 东方电子 | Dongfang Electronics Co, ltd. | 21.01.1997 | 1,340,727,007 | 978,027,357 | Manufacturing | http://www.dongfangelec.com |
| 000683 | YUAN XING Energy | 远兴能源 | Inner Mongolia Yuanxing Energy Company Limited | 31.01.1997 | 3,924,398,991 | 3,538,289,874 | Manufacturing | http://www.yuanxing.com |
| 000685 | ZPUG | 中山公用 | Zhongshan Public Utilities Group Co, ltd. | 23.01.1997 | 1,475,111,351 | 1,253,229,908 | Utilities | http://www.zpug.net |
| 000686 | Northeast Securities | 东北证券 | Northeast Securities Co, ltd. | 27.02.1997 | 2,340,452,915 | 2,340,452,915 | Finance | http://www.nesc.cn |
| 000687 | HUAXUN FANGZHOU | 华讯方舟 | Huaxun Fangzhou Co, ltd. | 21.02.1997 | 766,199,362 | 752,778,276 | Manufacturing | http://www.huaxunchina.com.cn |
| 000688 | GUOCHENG Mining | 国城矿业 | Guocheng Mining Co, ltd. | 20.01.1997 | 1,137,299,314 | 1,137,294,994 | Mining | http://www.gcky0688.com |
| 000690 | BAONENGYUAN | 宝新能源 | Guangdong Baolihua New Energy Stock Co, ltd. | 28.01.1997 | 2,175,887,862 | 2,084,122,681 | Utilities | http://www.baolihua.com.cn |
| 000691 | YATAI | 亚太实业 | Hainan Yatai Industrial Development Co, ltd. | 28.02.1997 | 323,270,000 | 290,486,300 | Real estate | http://www.ytsy000691.com |
| 000692 | HUITIAN Thermalpower | 惠天热电 | Shenyang Huitian Thermal Power Co, ltd. | 27.02.1997 | 532,832,976 | 532,785,879 | Utilities | |
| 000695 | TJBE | 滨海能源 | Tianjin Binhai Energy & Development Co, ltd. | 18.02.1997 | 222,147,539 | 221,721,339 | Manufacturing | http://www.binhaienergy.com |
| 000697 | LAT | 炼石航空 | Ligeance Aerospace Technology Co, ltd. | 25.03.1997 | 671,616,059 | 453,770,423 | Manufacturing | http://www.lsmin.com |
| 000698 | SY Chemical | 沈阳化工 | Shenyang Chemical Industry Co, ltd. | 20.02.1997 | 819,514,395 | 785,688,299 | Manufacturing | http://syhg.chemchina.com |

== 000700–000799 ==
| Code | Short-name | | Full name | Listing date | Issued capital | Negotiable capital | Industry | Http |
| Code | English | Chinese | Full name | Listing date | Issued capital | Negotiable capital | Industry | Http |
|---|---|---|---|---|---|---|---|---|
| 000717 | SGIS Songshan | | | | | | | |
| 000718 | Suning Universal | | | | | | | |
| 000739 | Apeloa Pharmaceutical | 普洛股份 | Apeloa Pharma. | 05.09.1997 | 11,785,234,920 | 11,785,234,920 | Pharmaceutical | http://www.apeloa.com |
| 000788 | PKU Healthcare | | | | | | | |
| 000739 | Innovo | 英洛华 | Innovo Tech | 08.08.1997 | 11,336,841,030 | 11,336,841,030 | Electronics | http://www.innuovo-mag.com |
| 000761 | Bengang Steel Plates | | | | | | | |
| 000785 | Easyhome | 居然智家 | | | | | | |
| 000793 | Huawen Media Investment | | | | | | | |

== 000800–000899 ==
| Code | Short-name | | Full name | Listing date | Issued capital | Negotiable capital | Industry | Http |
| Code | English | Chinese | Full name | Listing date | Issued capital | Negotiable capital | Industry | Http |
|---|---|---|---|---|---|---|---|---|
| 000878 | Yunnan Copper | 雲南銅業股份有限公司 | Yunnan Copper Company Limited | | | | Manufacturing | http://www.yunnan-copper.com/ |

== 000900–001999 ==
| Code | Short-name | | Full name | Listing date | Issued capital | Negotiable capital | Industry | Http |
| Code | English | Chinese | Full name | Listing date | Issued capital | Negotiable capital | Industry | Http |
|---|---|---|---|---|---|---|---|---|
| 000959 | Shougang | | | | | | | |
| 000983 | Xishan Coal and Electricity Power | | | | | | | |

== 2001–2100 ==
| Code | Short-name | Listing date | Issued capital | Negotiable capital | Industry | Http |
|---|---|---|---|---|---|---|
| 002001 | NHU | 25.06.2004 | 483,964,000 | 440,019,780 | Petrochemicals | http://www.cnhu.com |
| 002002 | JSQH | 25.06.2004 | 166,894,000 | 122,907,578 | Petrochemicals | http://www.chinaqionghua.com |
| 002003 | WEIXING | 25.06.2004 | 207,411,040 | 132,623,771 | | http://www.weixing.cn |
| 002004 | HUAPONT PHARM | 25.06.2004 | 132,000,000 | 100,215,467 | Pharmaceuticals | http://www.huapont.com.cn |
| 002005 | ETI | 25.06.2004 | 323,200,000 | 307,176,025 | Machinery | http://www.gddhrd.com |
| 002006 | JINGGONG SCIENCE | 25.06.2004 | 144,000,000 | 83,280,075 | Machinery | http://www.jgtec.com.cn |
| 002007 | HUALAN BIO. | 25.06.2004 | 576,204,800 | 576,120,147 | Pharmaceuticals | http://www.hualanbio.com |
| 002008 | Han's Laser | 25.06.2004 | 696,264,400 | 615,301,646 | Electronics | http://www.hanslaser.com |
| 002009 | MIRACLE LOGISTICS | 29.06.2004 | 221,010,822 | 152,879,320 | Machinery | http://www.chinaconveyor.com |
| 002010 | ZJ TRANSFAR | 29.06.2004 | 243,990,000 | 150,226,547 | Petrochemicals | http://www.tf-chem.com |
| 002011 | DUN'AN ENVIRONMENTAL | 05.07.2004 | 372,363,730 | 104,422,482 | Machinery | http://www.dunan.net |
| 002012 | KAN | 05.07.2004 | 194,789,298 | 194,789,298 | Paper & Printing | http://www.zjkan.com |
| 002013 | HAPM | 05.07.2004 | 167,076,000 | 123,866,899 | Machinery | http://www.hapm.cn |
| 002014 | NOVEL | 08.07.2004 | 140,784,000 | 139,091,707 | Petrochemicals | http://www.novel.com.cn |
| 002015 | XIAKE | 08.07.2004 | 201,088,000 | 145,925,977 | Textiles & Apparel | http://www.xiakehb.com |
| 002016 | SRZY | 08.07.2004 | 461,496,880 | 115,752,937 | Real Estate | http://www.gdsrzy.com |
| 002017 | EASTCOMPEACE | 13.07.2004 | 198,562,504 | 196,640,769 | | http://www.eastcompeace.com |
| 002018 | Huaxing Chemical | 13.07.2004 | 293,857,200 | 253,178,767 | Petrochemicals | http://www.huaxingchem.com |
| 002019 | XINFU PHARM | 13.07.2004 | 220,420,000 | 143,340,315 | Petrochemicals | http://www.xinfubiochem.com |
| 002020 | JINGXIN | 15.07.2004 | 101,550,000 | 76,758,888 | Pharmaceuticals | http://www.jingxinpharm.com |
| 002021 | ZOJE | 15.07.2004 | 436,780,800 | 436,780,800 | Machinery | http://www.zoje.com |
| 002022 | KHB | 21.07.2004 | 492,277,500 | 436,808,874 | Pharmaceuticals | http://www.skhb.com |
| 002023 | HAITE | 21.07.2004 | 295,175,385 | 250,389,851 | Transportation | http://www.schtgx.com |
| 002024 | Suning Commerce Group | 21.07.2004 | 6,996,211,866 | 4,713,854,580 | Wholesale & Retail | https://web.archive.org/web/20130114220604/http://www.cnsuning.com/ |
| 002025 | SACO | 26.07.2004 | 330,000,000 | 192,339,361 | Electronics | http://www.gzhtdq.com.cn |
| 002026 | SHANDONG WEIDA | 27.07.2004 | 135,000,000 | 91,968,750 | Metals & Non -metals | http://www.weidapeacock.com |
| 002027 | HEDY | 04.08.2004 | 302,335,116 | 192,561,352 | IT | http://www.hedy.com.cn |
| 002028 | SIEYUAN | 05.08.2004 | 439,680,000 | 297,070,402 | Machinery | http://www.syec.com.cn |
| 002029 | SEPTWOLVES | 06.08.2004 | 282,900,000 | 282,892,395 | Textiles & Apparel | http://www.spetwolves.com |
| 002030 | DAJY | 09.08.2004 | 288,921,600 | 276,745,738 | Pharmaceuticals | http://www.daangene.com |
| 002031 | GREATOO | 16.08.2004 | 265,274,356 | 124,477,856 | Machinery | http://www.greatoo.com |
| 002032 | SUPOR | 17.08.2004 | 577,252,000 | 138,225,859 | Metals & Non -metals | http://www.supor.com.cn |
| 002033 | LIJIANG TOURISM | 25.08.2004 | 116,323,048 | 71,893,829 | Social Services | http://www.yulongtour.com |
| 002034 | MIZUDA | 26.08.2004 | 81,120,000 | 59,067,935 | Textiles & Apparel | http://www.mizuda.com |
| 002035 | VATTI | 01.09.2004 | 223,303,080 | 223,303,080 | Metals & Non -metals | http://www.vatti.com.cn |
| 002036 | YAK | 03.09.2004 | 202,248,900 | 190,421,029 | Textiles & Apparel | http://www.yakgroup.com |
| 002037 | JIULIAN DEVELOPMENT | 08.09.2004 | 173,030,000 | 173,030,000 | Petrochemicals | http://www.gzjiulian.com |
| 002038 | SL PHARM | 09.09.2004 | 251,880,000 | 207,213,993 | Pharmaceuticals | http://www.slpharm.com.cn |
| 002039 | QIANYUAN POWER | 03.03.2005 | 140,256,000 | 123,386,171 | Utilities | http://www.gzqydl.cn |
| 002040 | NANJING PORT | 25.03.2005 | 245,872,000 | 120,477,280 | Transportation | http://www.nj-port.com |
| 002041 | DENGHAI SEEDS | 18.04.2005 | 176,000,000 | 163,545,035 | Agriculture | http://www.denghai.com |
| 002042 | HUAFU | 27.04.2005 | 235,111,000 | 74,420,480 | Textiles & Apparel | http://www.e-huafu.com |
| 002043 | DEHUA TB | 10.05.2005 | 183,000,000 | 176,672,640 | Timber & Furnishings | http://www.dhwooden.com |
| 002044 | JIANGSU SANYOU | 18.05.2005 | 162,500,000 | 117,975,000 | Textiles & Apparel | http://www.sanyougroup.com |
| 002045 | GGEC | 23.05.2005 | 277,936,000 | 204,678,343 | Electronics | http://www.ggec.com.cn |
| 002046 | BEARING-SCI&TECH. | 26.05.2005 | 108,090,000 | 64,350,000 | Machinery | http://www.zys.com.cn |
| 002047 | Shenzhen Globe Union | 31.05.2005 | 453,664,827 | 453,664,827 | Metals & Non -metals | http://www.szcl.com.cn |
| 002048 | NBHX | 03.06.2005 | 567,140,000 | 423,330,643 | Machinery | http://www.nbhx.com.cn/chinese/ |
| 002049 | JINGYUAN ELECTRONICS | 06.06.2005 | 135,000,000 | 83,881,751 | Electronics | http://www.jingyuan.com |
| 002050 | SANHUA | 07.06.2005 | 264,000,000 | 68,760,714 | Machinery | http://www.zjshc.com |
| 002051 | CAMCE | 19.06.2006 | 190,000,000 | 189,802,499 | Social Services | http://www.camce.com.cn |
| 002052 | COSHIP | 27.06.2006 | 341,479,847 | 211,938,854 | IT | http://www.coship.com |
| 002053 | YSCC | 27.06.2006 | 185,851,103 | 185,851,103 | Food & Beverage | http://www.ynyh.com |
| 002054 | DYMATIC CHEM | 25.07.2006 | 220,691,120 | 160,908,515 | Petrochemicals | http://www.dymatic.com |
| 002055 | DEREN | 25.07.2006 | 174,587,207 | 170,717,847 | Electronics | http://www.deren.com.cn |
| 002056 | DMEGC | 02.08.2006 | 410,900,000 | 410,896,850 | Electronics | http://www.chinadmegc.com |
| 002057 | Tianyuan Technology | 02.08.2006 | 84,000,000 | 84,000,000 | Petrochemicals | http://www.ty-magnet.com |
| 002058 | WELLTECH | 02.08.2006 | 62,368,840 | 60,919,783 | Machinery | http://www.welltech.com.cn |
| 002059 | KUNMING EXPO GARDEN | 10.08.2006 | 215,000,000 | 80,560,000 | Social Services | https://web.archive.org/web/20140714150515/http://www.expo99km.com/ |
| 002060 | GHEC | 10.08.2006 | 332,400,000 | 205,878,750 | Construction | http://www.gdsdej.com |
| 002061 | Jianshan Chemical | 16.08.2006 | 139,980,000 | 88,980,000 | Petrochemicals | http://www.jiangshanchem.com |
| 002062 | HONGRUN | 16.08.2006 | 450,000,000 | 146,265,680 | Construction | http://www.chinahongrun.com |
| 002063 | YGSOFT | 23.08.2006 | 256,978,800 | 245,735,508 | IT | http://www.ygsoft.com |
| 002064 | Huafeng Spandex | 23.08.2006 | 738,400,000 | 650,665,500 | Petrochemicals | http://www.spandex.com.cn |
| 002065 | DHCC | 23.08.2006 | 425,985,090 | 333,112,080 | IT | http://www.dhcc.com.cn |
| 002066 | Ruitai Technology | 23.08.2006 | 115,500,000 | 114,960,570 | Metals & Non -metals | http://www.bjruitai.com |
| 002067 | JING XING PAPER | 15.09.2006 | 392,000,000 | 329,037,500 | Paper & Printing | http://www.zjjxjt.com |
| 002068 | BCCB | 15.09.2006 | 249,912,000 | 249,907,732 | Petrochemicals | http://www.jx-blackcat.com |
| 002069 | DZF | 28.09.2006 | 452,400,000 | 426,865,238 | Agriculture | http://www.zhangzidao.com |
| 002070 | ZHONGHE | 12.10.2006 | 289,148,000 | 141,826,938 | Textiles & Apparel | http://www.zhonghe.com |
| 002071 | Jiangsu Hongbao | 12.10.2006 | 184,020,000 | 180,161,277 | Metals & Non -metals | http://www.hongbao.com |
| 002072 | Demian | 18.10.2006 | 176,000,000 | 176,000,000 | Textiles & Apparel | http://www.textiledm.com |
| 002073 | MESNAC | 18.10.2006 | 742,365,000 | 523,446,048 | Machinery | http://www.mesnac.com |
| 002074 | DYDQ | 18.10.2006 | 140,760,000 | 119,553,834 | Machinery | http://www.jsdydq.com |
| 002075 | STZHANGTONG | 25.10.2006 | 396,000,000 | 248,040,000 | Metals & Non -metals | http://www.zhangtong.com, www.chinacopper.com |
| 002076 | CNLIGHT | 25.10.2006 | 184,270,676 | 105,310,283 | Electronics | http://www.cnlight.com |
| 002077 | Jiangsu Dagang | 16.11.2006 | 252,000,000 | 106,794,380 | Conglomerates | http://www.dggf.cn |
| 002078 | SUN PAPER | 16.11.2006 | 1,004,810,394 | 1,004,805,594 | Paper & Printing | http://www.sunpapergroup.com |
| 002079 | SUZHOU GOOD-ARK | 16.11.2006 | 276,000,000 | 275,962,500 | Electronics | http://www.goodark.com |
| 002080 | sinomatech | 20.11.2006 | 150,000,000 | 150,000,000 | Metals & Non -metals | http://www.sinomatech.com |
| 002081 | Gold Mantis | 20.11.2006 | 319,194,000 | 284,735,998 | Construction | http://www.goldmantis.com |
| 002082 | DLXC | 20.11.2006 | 238,000,000 | 125,801,040 | Metals & Non -metals | http://www.dongliang.com.cn |
| 002083 | SUNVIM | 24.11.2006 | 938,482,978 | 391,302,900 | Textiles & Apparel | http://www.sunvim.com |
| 002084 | Seagull | 24.11.2006 | 279,652,765 | 279,652,765 | Metals & Non -metals | http://www.seagullgroup.cn |
| 002085 | Wanfeng Auto Holding Group | 28.11.2006 | 284,350,000 | 261,981,086 | Machinery | http://www.wfaw.com.cn |
| 002086 | ORIENTAL OCEAN | 28.11.2006 | 243,850,000 | 231,282,825 | Agriculture | http://www.yt-fishery.com |
| 002087 | XINYE TEXTILE | 30.11.2006 | 371,256,000 | 149,047,131 | Textiles & Apparel | http://www.xinye-tex.com |
| 002088 | LYGF | 30.11.2006 | 233,978,689 | 199,713,713 | Metals & Non -metals | http://www.luyangwool.com |
| 002089 | nsu | 30.11.2006 | 235,259,200 | 147,652,437 | IT | http://www.nsu.com.cn |
| 002090 | WISCOM | 08.12.2006 | 204,000,000 | 178,693,202 | IT | http://www.wiscom.com.cn |
| 002091 | JSGT | 08.12.2006 | 300,000,000 | 234,918,563 | Wholesale & Retail | http://www.gtiggm.com |
| 002092 | ZHONGTAI CHEMICAL | 08.12.2006 | 769,560,000 | 427,787,375 | Petrochemicals | http://www.zthx.com |
| 002093 | Gmtech | 15.12.2006 | 400,500,000 | 334,664,397 | IT | http://www.guomaitech.com |
| 002094 | Kingking | 15.12.2006 | 214,611,080 | 214,611,080 | | http://www.chinakingking.com |
| 002095 | NetSun | 15.12.2006 | 135,000,000 | 133,601,135 | IT | http://www.chinanetsun.com |
| 002096 | HNNL IEMC | 22.12.2006 | 132,200,100 | 131,930,100 | Petrochemicals | http://www.hnnlmb.com |
| 002097 | SUNWARD INTELLIGENT | 22.12.2006 | 411,450,000 | 294,908,376 | Machinery | http://www.sunward.com.cn |
| 002098 | SBS | 22.12.2006 | 155,000,000 | 155,000,000 | | http://www.sbszipper.com.cn |
| 002099 | Hisoar | 26.12.2006 | 160,500,000 | 123,434,394 | Pharmaceuticals | http://www.hisoar.com |
| 002100 | TCSW | 26.12.2006 | 226,736,900 | 194,687,740 | Food & Beverage | http://www.tcsw.com.cn |

== 2101–2200 ==
| Code | Short-name | Listing date | Issued capital | Negotiable capital | Industry | Http |
|---|---|---|---|---|---|---|
| 002101 | GUANGDONG HONGTU | 29.12.2006 | 67,000,000 | 67,000,000 | Machinery | http://www.ght-china.com |
| 002102 | Guanfu Household | 29.12.2006 | 170,509,737 | 84,369,428 | Metals & Non -metals | http://www.guanfu.com |
| 002103 | Guangbo Shares | 10.01.2007 | 218,431,000 | 166,726,016 | Paper & Printing | http://www.guangbo.net |
| 002104 | HengBao Co., LTD | 10.01.2007 | 440,640,000 | 275,794,643 | | http://www.hengbao.com |
| 002105 | XLSY | 12.01.2007 | 268,000,000 | 268,000,000 | Paper & Printing | http://www.hlcorp.com.cn |
| 002106 | LAIBAO HI-TECH | 12.01.2007 | 428,854,400 | 406,882,055 | Electronics | http://www.laibao.com.cn |
| 002107 | WHYY | 24.01.2007 | 163,980,000 | 71,301,673 | Pharmaceuticals | http://www.wohua.cn |
| 002108 | Cangzhou Mingzhu | 24.01.2007 | 167,586,000 | 164,852,400 | Petrochemicals | http://www.cz-mz.com |
| 002109 | XINGHUA CHEMISTRY | 26.01.2007 | 358,400,000 | 203,234,885 | Petrochemicals | http://www.snxhchem.com |
| 002110 | Sansteel MinGuang | 26.01.2007 | 534,700,000 | 139,700,000 | Metals & Non -metals | http://www.sgmg.com.cn |
| 002111 | Guangtai | 26.01.2007 | 147,425,805 | 74,241,630 | Machinery | http://www.guangtai.com.cn |
| 002112 | SCI-TECH | 08.02.2007 | 112,000,000 | 101,732,785 | Machinery | http://www.sanbian.cn |
| 002113 | TRFZ | 08.02.2007 | 118,400,000 | 114,824,031 | Petrochemicals | http://www.trfz.com |
| 002114 | LPXD | 15.02.2007 | 183,852,000 | 183,850,950 | Metals & Non -metals | http://www.lpxdgf.cn |
| 002115 | SUNWAVE | 15.02.2007 | 214,560,000 | 160,202,875 | IT | http://www.sunwave.com.cn |
| 002116 | Haisum | 15.02.2007 | 114,000,000 | 48,510,771 | Social Services | http://www.haisum.com |
| 002117 | TungKong | 02.03.2007 | 110,000,000 | 110,000,000 | Paper & Printing | http://www.tungkong.com.cn |
| 002118 | JLZX | 02.03.2007 | 206,620,380 | 80,882,872 | Pharmaceuticals | http://www.jilinzixin.com.cn |
| 002119 | Ningbo Kangqiang | 02.03.2007 | 194,200,000 | 185,128,435 | Electronics | http://www.kangqiang.com |
| 002120 | XINHAI | 06.03.2007 | 150,280,000 | 93,466,791 | | http://www.xinhaigroup.com |
| 002121 | SZCLOU | 06.03.2007 | 240,000,000 | 143,689,240 | Electronics | http://www.szclou.com |
| 002122 | TianMa Co., Ltd. | 28.03.2007 | 1,188,000,000 | 1,005,768,000 | Machinery | http://www.zjtmb.com |
| 002123 | RXPE | 28.03.2007 | 336,000,000 | 263,799,605 | Machinery | http://www.rxpe.com |
| 002124 | TBGF | 03.04.2007 | 205,500,000 | 126,585,309 | Food & Beverage | http://www.tianbang.com |
| 002125 | XTEMD | 03.04.2007 | 75,400,000 | 75,397,675 | Petrochemicals | http://www.chinaemd.com |
| 002126 | YINLUN | 18.04.2007 | 100,000,000 | 89,700,380 | Machinery | http://www.yinlun.com |
| 002127 | XINMIN | 18.04.2007 | 372,049,085 | 169,799,914 | Textiles & Apparel | http://www.xmtex.com |
| 002128 | OPENCUT COAL | 18.04.2007 | 1,326,686,166 | 1,326,686,166 | Mining | http://www.zdhm.com.cn |
| 002129 | TJSEMI | 20.04.2007 | 482,829,608 | 255,907,610 | Electronics | http://www.tjsemi.com |
| 002130 | WOER | 20.04.2007 | 244,575,000 | 126,295,709 | | http://www.woer.com |
| 002131 | LEO | 27.04.2007 | 301,120,000 | 145,295,224 | Machinery | http://www.chinapumps.com |
| 002132 | HXKJ | 27.04.2007 | 269,934,900 | 109,578,005 | Metals & Non -metals | http://www.hengxingchinese.com |
| 002133 | COSMOS | 27.04.2007 | 498,600,000 | 316,462,290 | Real Estate | http://www.cosmosgroup.com.cn |
| 002134 | TIANJIN PRINTRONICS | 16.05.2007 | 245,849,768 | 245,849,768 | Electronics | http://www.toppcb.com |
| 002135 | SESPACE | 30.05.2007 | 200,000,000 | 166,639,250 | Construction | http://www.dongnanwangjia.com |
| 002136 | ANDTY | 30.05.2007 | 78,920,000 | 76,056,000 | Petrochemicals | http://www.andty.com |
| 002137 | SEA STAR | 13.06.2007 | 260,130,000 | 256,851,075 | Electronics | http://www.sz-seastar.com |
| 002138 | Sunlord | 13.06.2007 | 129,551,500 | 110,985,160 | Electronics | http://www.sunlordinc.com |
| 002139 | TOPBAND | 29.06.2007 | 168,000,000 | 113,303,779 | Electronics | http://www.topband-e.com |
| 002140 | DHKJ | 12.07.2007 | 278,771,584 | 269,143,384 | Social Services | http://www.chinaecec.com |
| 002141 | RONSEN | 20.07.2007 | 113,680,000 | 55,063,750 | Electronics | http://www.ronsen.com.cn |
| 002142 | BANK OF NINGBO | 19.07.2007 | 2,500,000,000 | 2,474,429,325 | Financials | http://www.nbcb.com.cn |
| 002143 | Gaojin Food | 20.07.2007 | 160,500,000 | 70,825,496 | Food & Beverage | http://www.gaojin.com.cn |
| 002144 | HONGDA KNITTING | 03.08.2007 | 151,338,800 | 60,677,623 | Textiles & Apparel | http://www.zjhongda.com.cn |
| 002145 | CNNCTD | 03.08.2007 | 190,000,000 | 99,858,000 | Petrochemicals | http://www.tioxhua.com |
| 002146 | RiseSun | 08.08.2007 | 1,433,600,000 | 250,888,520 | Real Estate | http://www.risesun.cn |
| 002147 | FY SLewing Ring | 08.08.2007 | 225,600,000 | 138,537,471 | Machinery | http://www.masfy.com |
| 002148 | BEWIN COM | 10.08.2007 | 75,600,000 | 47,532,525 | IT | http://www.bisp.com |
| 002149 | WMM | 10.08.2007 | 174,630,000 | 72,750,000 | Metals & Non -metals | http://www.c-wmm.com |
| 002150 | TONGRUN TOOL CABINET | 10.08.2007 | 156,375,000 | 49,905,000 | Metals & Non -metals | http://www.tongrunindustries.com |
| 002151 | BDStar Navigation | 13.08.2007 | 90,950,000 | 22,950,000 | IT | http://www.NavChina.com |
| 002152 | GRGBanking | 13.08.2007 | 342,141,624 | 155,169,633 | Machinery | http://www.grgbanking.com |
| 002153 | Shiji Information | 13.08.2007 | 224,000,000 | 71,634,288 | IT | http://www.shijinet.com.cn |
| 002154 | BAOXINIAO GARMENT | 16.08.2007 | 293,747,524 | 102,480,000 | Textiles & Apparel | http://www.bxn.com |
| 002155 | Chenzhou Mining | 16.08.2007 | 547,400,000 | 306,187,466 | Mining | http://www.hncmi.com |
| 002156 | NFME | 16.08.2007 | 347,100,000 | 97,110,000 | Electronics | http://www.fujitsu-nt.com |
| 002157 | ZHENGBANG TECH | 17.08.2007 | 269,410,355 | 95,303,907 | Food & Beverage | http://www.zhengbang.com |
| 002158 | HANBELL | 17.08.2007 | 181,728,750 | 47,922,657 | Machinery | http://www.hanbell.com.cn |
| 002159 | Sante Cableways | 17.08.2007 | 120,000,000 | 76,131,456 | Social Services | http://www.sante.com.cn |
| 002160 | Alcha | 21.08.2007 | 170,000,000 | 93,500,000 | Metals & Non -metals | http://www.alcha.com |
| 002161 | INVENGO | 21.08.2007 | 256,800,000 | 125,694,493 | IT | http://www.invengo.cn |
| 002162 | CIMIC | 23.08.2007 | 418,000,000 | 115,901,918 | Metals & Non -metals | http://www.cimic.com |
| 002163 | CAS | 23.08.2007 | 401,775,000 | 122,176,425 | Construction | http://www.sanxinglass.com |
| 002164 | Donly | 23.08.2007 | 180,000,000 | 75,000,000 | Machinery | http://www.donly.com.cn |
| 002165 | HONGBAOLI | 13.09.2007 | 252,000,000 | 134,135,802 | Petrochemicals | http://www.hongbaoli.com |
| 002166 | LAYN | 13.09.2007 | 129,533,760 | 67,665,274 | Pharmaceuticals | http://www.layn.com.cn |
| 002167 | ORIENT ZIRCONIC | 13.09.2007 | 179,712,000 | 114,938,019 | Petrochemicals | http://www.orientzr.com |
| 002168 | SZHC | 19.09.2007 | 300,438,720 | 96,243,150 | Machinery | http://www.hifuture.com |
| 002169 | ZHIGUANG ELECTRIC | 19.09.2007 | 165,792,000 | 76,432,454 | Machinery | http://www.gzzg.com.cn |
| 002170 | BaTian | 19.09.2007 | 304,560,000 | 77,758,481 | Petrochemicals | http://www.batian.com.cn |
| 002171 | Jingcheng Copper | 21.09.2007 | 163,020,000 | 58,105,050 | Metals & Non -metals | http://www.jcty.cn |
| 002172 | Aoyang Technology | 21.09.2007 | 522,000,000 | 213,900,000 | Petrochemicals | http://www.aykj.cn |
| 002173 | SHANXIAHU PEARL | 25.09.2007 | 100,500,000 | 25,500,000 | | http://www.shanxiahupearl.cn |
| 002174 | SUSINO | 25.09.2007 | 82,939,921 | 34,007,383 | | http://www.susino.com |
| 002175 | GLMI | 12.10.2007 | 85,398,288 | 50,056,898 | Machinery | http://www.guanglu.com.cn |
| 002176 | JIANGTE MOTOR | 12.10.2007 | 108,446,568 | 74,276,980 | Machinery | http://www.jiangte.com.cn |
| 002177 | KingTeller | 01.11.2007 | 264,946,500 | 78,384,192 | Machinery | http://www.kingteller.com.cn |
| 002178 | YANHUA SMARTECH | 01.11.2007 | 96,000,000 | 45,470,400 | Social Services | http://www.chinaforwards.com |
| 002179 | CAOE | 01.11.2007 | 401,625,000 | 209,148,750 | Electronics | http://www.ca158.com.cn |
| 002180 | Wanlida | 13.11.2007 | 83,322,000 | 21,000,000 | Machinery | http://www.zhwld.com |
| 002181 | Guangdong Media | 16.11.2007 | 350,077,364 | 213,372,610 | Media | http://www.gdcncm.com |
| 002182 | YUNHAI METALS | 13.11.2007 | 192,000,000 | 102,374,940 | Metals & Non -metals | http://www.rsm.com.cn |
| 002183 | EA | 13.11.2007 | 556,084,161 | 237,384,122 | Social Services | http://www.eascs.com |
| 002184 | Hite Control | 16.11.2007 | 220,000,000 | 82,879,458 | IT | http://www.hite.com.cn |
| 002185 | HUATIAN TECH | 20.11.2007 | 373,230,000 | 233,805,000 | Electronics | http://www.tshtkj.com/ |
| 002186 | QUANJUDE | 20.11.2007 | 141,560,000 | 54,130,000 | Social Services | http://www.quanjude.com.cn |
| 002187 | Grandbuy | 22.11.2007 | 168,883,291 | 58,000,000 | Wholesale & Retail | http://www.grandbuy.com.cn |
| 002188 | NEW JIALIAN | 22.11.2007 | 156,000,000 | 106,551,572 | Electronics | http://www.newjialian.com |
| 002189 | LIDA | 03.12.2007 | 199,240,000 | 91,070,848 | Electronics | http://www.lida-oe.com |
| 002190 | CITC | 03.12.2007 | 206,227,200 | 65,049,600 | Machinery | http://www.cac-citc.com.cn |
| 002191 | JINJIA CO., LTD. | 05.12.2007 | 642,000,000 | 182,869,440 | Paper & Printing | http://www.szjcp.com |
| 002192 | LXGF | 05.12.2007 | 121,400,000 | 57,719,650 | Petrochemicals | http://www.luxiang.cn |
| 002193 | Shandong Ruyi | 07.12.2007 | 160,000,000 | 82,283,326 | Textiles & Apparel | http://www.shandongruyi.com |
| 002194 | Fingu | 07.12.2007 | 555,880,000 | 140,934,500 | IT | http://www.fingu.com |
| 002195 | HYRON SOFTWARE | 12.12.2007 | 74,620,000 | 32,234,800 | IT | http://www.hyron.com |
| 002196 | FOUNDER MOTOR | 12.12.2007 | 77,150,000 | 20,000,000 | Machinery | http://www.fdm.com.cn |
| 002197 | SZZT | 18.12.2007 | 131,145,000 | 54,041,004 | Machinery | http://www.szzt.com.cn |
| 002198 | JYPC | 18.12.2007 | 82,000,000 | 20,500,000 | Pharmaceuticals | http://www.gdjyzy.com.cn |
| 002199 | ECEC | 21.12.2007 | 104,780,000 | 27,040,000 | Electronics | http://www.ecec.com.cn |
| 002200 | YUNNAN GREENLAND | 21.12.2007 | 151,087,104 | 105,330,905 | Agriculture | http://www.yngreen.com |

== 2201–2300 ==
|-

| Code | Short-name | Listing date | Issued capital | Negotiable capital | Industry | Http |
|---|---|---|---|---|---|---|
| 002201 | JIUDING | 26.12.2007 | 135,200,000 | 58,545,410 | Metals & Non -metals | http://www.cjdg.com |
| 002202 | GOLDWIND | 26.12.2007 | 2,240,000,000 | 989,247,571 | Machinery | https://web.archive.org/web/20070928054527/http://www.goldwind.cn/ |
| 002203 | HAILIANG Co., Ltd. | 16.01.2008 | 400,100,000 | 179,239,230 | Metals & Non -metals | http://www.hailiang.com |
| 002204 | Huarui Steel Casting | 16.01.2008 | 214,000,000 | 54,000,000 | Machinery | |
| 002205 | GUOTONG | 23.01.2008 | 100,000,000 | 40,637,687 | Metals & Non -metals | http://www.xjgt.com |
| 002206 | HAILIDE | 23.01.2008 | 250,000,000 | 136,600,000 | Petrochemicals | www.hailide.com.cn |
| 002207 | XZPT | 28.01.2008 | 99,458,689 | 25,000,000 | Mining | http://www.zygf.com.cn |
| 002208 | HUCD | 28.01.2008 | 320,100,000 | 123,214,332 | Real Estate | http://www.hucd.cn |
| 002209 | TECH-LONG | 30.01.2008 | 195,244,050 | 74,770,969 | Machinery | http://www.tech-long.com |
| 002210 | FEIMA INT'L | 30.01.2008 | 306,000,000 | 85,477,500 | Social Services | http://www.fmscm.com |
| 002211 | Hongda New Material | 01.02.2008 | 241,877,186 | 75,615,392 | Petrochemicals | http://www.jshdxc.com |
| 002212 | NANYANG HOLDING | 01.02.2008 | 226,500,000 | 57,195,985 | Machinery | http://www.nanyangcable.com |
| 002213 | TERCA | 01.02.2008 | 206,000,000 | 92,383,450 | Machinery | http://www.terca.cn |
| 002214 | Dali Tech | 18.02.2008 | 100,000,000 | 61,600,588 | Electronics | http://www.dali-tech.com |
| 002215 | NOPOSION | 18.02.2008 | 221,300,000 | 64,729,629 | Petrochemicals | http://www.noposion.com |
| 002216 | SANQUAN FOODS | 20.02.2008 | 187,000,000 | 47,860,000 | Food & Beverage | http://www.sanquan.com |
| 002217 | LIAHERD CHEMICAL | 20.02.2008 | 222,984,000 | 156,020,801 | Petrochemicals | http://www.lianhechem.com.cn |
| 002218 | TOPRAYSOLAR | 28.02.2008 | 288,000,000 | 72,000,000 | Electronics | http://www.topraysolar.com |
| 002219 | Duyiwei Phar. | 06.03.2008 | 186,800,000 | 46,800,000 | Pharmaceuticals | http://www.duyiwei.com |
| 002220 | Tianbao Foods | 28.02.2008 | 196,000,000 | 67,790,842 | Food & Beverage | http://www.cn-tianbao.com |
| 002221 | DHE | 06.03.2008 | 222,000,000 | 104,090,000 | Wholesale & Retail | http://www.chinadhe.com |
| 002222 | CASTECH | 19.03.2008 | 190,000,000 | 106,835,467 | Electronics | http://www.castech.com |
| 002223 | YUYUE MEDICAL | 18.04.2008 | 255,580,000 | 62,400,000 | Machinery | http://www.yuyue.com.cn |
| 002224 | SANLUX | 25.04.2008 | 133,200,000 | 34,200,000 | Petrochemicals | http://www.v-belt.com |
| 002225 | PRCO | 25.04.2008 | 561,896,218 | 77,999,900 | Metals & Non -metals | http://www.punai.com |
| 002226 | JIANGNAN CHEMICAL | 06.05.2008 | 139,959,664 | 86,481,236 | Petrochemicals | http://www.ahjnhg.com |
| 002227 | ATC | 06.05.2008 | 108,576,950 | 27,500,000 | Machinery | http://www.atc-a.com |
| 002228 | HXPP | 08.05.2008 | 217,190,000 | 47,500,000 | Paper & Printing | http://www.hxpp.com.cn |
| 002229 | HONGBO PRINTING | 08.05.2008 | 136,000,000 | 39,572,350 | Paper & Printing | http://www.hb-print.com.cn |
| 002230 | iFLYTEK | 12.05.2008 | 160,749,000 | 83,639,963 | IT | http://www.iflytek.com |
| 002231 | ALLWILL TELECOM | 12.05.2008 | 160,500,000 | 40,500,000 | IT | http://www.syallwin.com |
| 002232 | QiMing IT | 09.05.2008 | 291,820,325 | 124,363,076 | IT | http://www.qm.cn |
| 002233 | Tapai Group | 16.05.2008 | 400,000,000 | 120,250,000 | Metals & Non -metals | http://www.tapai.com |
| 002234 | MINHE | 16.05.2008 | 107,500,000 | 49,736,628 | Agriculture | http://www.minhe.cn |
| 002235 | ANNE | 16.05.2008 | 195,000,000 | 57,104,125 | Paper & Printing | http://www.anne.com.cn |
| 002236 | DAHUA INC | 20.05.2008 | 139,540,200 | 48,617,570 | Electronics | http://www.dahuatech.com |
| 002237 | Humon Share | 20.05.2008 | 191,600,000 | 67,274,550 | Metals & Non -metals | http://www.hbyl.cn |
| 002238 | TOPWAY | 26.05.2008 | 267,000,000 | 102,994,938 | Media | http://www.topway.com.cn |
| 002239 | KINGFIELD | 22.05.2008 | 201,000,000 | 55,500,000 | Textiles & Apparel | http://www.kfield.com.cn |
| 002240 | WEIHUA | 23.05.2008 | 306,690,000 | 124,319,694 | Timber & Furnishings | http://www.weihuaonline.com |
| 002241 | GoerTek | 22.05.2008 | 360,000,000 | 90,000,000 | Electronics | http://www.goertek.com |
| 002242 | Joyoung | 28.05.2008 | 760,950,000 | 190,950,000 | Machinery | http://www.joyoung.com.cn |
| 002243 | BEAUTYSTAR | 28.05.2008 | 258,068,956 | 105,089,415 | Petrochemicals | http://www.beautystar.cn |
| 002244 | Binjiang Group | 29.05.2008 | 1,352,000,000 | 293,415,200 | Real Estate | http://www.binjiang.com.cn |
| 002245 | AUCKSUN | 05.06.2008 | 182,400,000 | 65,878,125 | Social Services | http://www.aucksun.com |
| 002246 | SNC | 05.06.2008 | 197,891,024 | 52,262,787 | Petrochemicals | https://web.archive.org/web/20050303171109/http://www.sn-nc.com/ |
| 002247 | DILON | 12.06.2008 | 100,200,000 | 36,450,000 | | http://www.dilong.cc |
| 002248 | WHHD | 12.06.2008 | 128,747,800 | 38,695,850 | Machinery | http://www.huadongcnc.com |
| 002249 | DYDJ | 19.06.2008 | 428,400,000 | 108,800,000 | Machinery | http://www.broad-ocean.com.cn |
| 002250 | LIANHE TECHNOLOGY | 19.06.2008 | 245,366,000 | 96,164,989 | Petrochemicals | http://www.hlchem.com |
| 002251 | Better Life | 19.06.2008 | 270,360,000 | 82,514,284 | Wholesale & Retail | http://www.bbg.com.cn |
| 002252 | Shanghai RAAS | 23.06.2008 | 160,000,000 | 40,000,000 | Pharmaceuticals | http://www.raas-corp.com |
| 002253 | Wisesoft | 23.06.2008 | 74,880,000 | 33,752,160 | IT | http://www.wisesoft.com.cn |
| 002254 | YTSPAN | 25.06.2008 | 261,040,000 | 159,123,744 | Petrochemicals | http://www.ytspandex.com |
| 002255 | Hailu Heavy Industry | 25.06.2008 | 129,100,000 | 30,190,000 | Machinery | http://www.hailu-boiler.cn |
| 002256 | RAINBOW | 25.06.2008 | 208,800,000 | 127,056,000 | Petrochemicals | http://www.7cf.com |
| 002258 | Lier Chemical | 08.07.2008 | 202,444,033 | 63,592,508 | Petrochemicals | http://www.lierchem.com |
| 002259 | SHENGDA FORESTRY | 16.07.2008 | 301,000,000 | 119,626,138 | Timber & Furnishings | http://www.shengdawood.com |
| 002260 | ELECPRO | 16.07.2008 | 156,000,000 | 39,000,000 | Machinery | http://www.elecpro.com |
| 002261 | TALKWEB | 23.07.2008 | 145,355,816 | 70,539,886 | IT | http://www.talkweb.com.cn |
| 002262 | NHWA | 23.07.2008 | 234,000,000 | 86,761,267 | Wholesale & Retail | http://www.nhwa-group.com |
| 002263 | Great Southeast | 28.07.2008 | 465,714,034 | 119,186,163 | Petrochemicals | http://www.chinaddn.com |
| 002264 | NEW HUA DU | 31.07.2008 | 160,320,000 | 56,493,750 | Wholesale & Retail | https://web.archive.org/web/20100223215923/http://www.nhd-mart.com/ |
| 002265 | XYIC | 06.08.2008 | 291,026,000 | 84,428,704 | Machinery | http://www.ynxygy.com |
| 002266 | Zhe Fu | 06.08.2008 | 143,190,000 | 66,909,368 | Machinery | http://www.zhefu.cn |
| 002267 | ShaanXi Natural Gas | 13.08.2008 | 508,418,675 | 99,999,750 | Utilities | http://www.shaanxigas.com |
| 002268 | Westone | 11.08.2008 | 132,855,435 | 77,381,889 | IT | http://www.westone.com.cn |
| 002269 | Metersbonwe | 28.08.2008 | 1,005,000,000 | 105,000,000 | Wholesale & Retail | http://www.metersbonwe.com |
| 002270 | FINCM | 05.09.2008 | 145,500,000 | 36,500,000 | Machinery | http://www.fincm.com |
| 002271 | ORIENTAL YUHONG | 10.09.2008 | 158,280,000 | 57,706,851 | Metals & Non -metals | http://www.yuhong.com.cn |
| 002272 | CRUN | 19.09.2008 | 113,700,000 | 26,817,000 | Machinery | http://www.chuanrun.com |
| 002273 | ZQCOT | 19.09.2008 | 112,723,000 | 66,152,613 | Electronics | http://www.crystal-optech.com |
| 002274 | HUACHANG CHEMICAL | 25.09.2008 | 261,473,176 | 102,849,301 | Petrochemicals | http://www.huachangchem.cn |
| 002275 | GLSJ | 10.07.2009 | 454,000,000 | 102,605,367 | Pharmaceuticals | http://www.sanjin.com.cn |
| 002276 | Zhejiang Wanma | 10.07.2009 | 400,000,000 | 137,972,800 | Machinery | http://www.wanma-cable.cn |
| 002277 | Hn.F&A.Co., Ltd | 17.07.2009 | 349,200,000 | 206,136,000 | Wholesale & Retail | http://www.your-mart.cn |
| 002278 | Shanghai Shenkai | 11.08.2009 | 217,936,070 | 55,200,000 | Machinery | http://www.shenkai.com |
| 002279 | Join-Cheer | 11.08.2009 | 109,872,066 | 27,540,000 | IT | http://www.jiuqi.com.cn |
| 002280 | NEW CENTURY | 21.08.2009 | 107,000,000 | 27,000,000 | IT | http://www.nci.com.cn |
| 002281 | ACCELINK | 21.08.2009 | 160,000,000 | 40,000,000 | IT | http://www.accelink.com |
| 002282 | BOSUN TOOLS | 21.08.2009 | 173,400,000 | 43,400,000 | | http://www.bosuntools.com |
| 002283 | TIANRUN INC. | 21.08.2009 | 240,000,000 | 60,000,000 | Machinery | http://www.tianrun.com |
| 002284 | APG STOCK | 28.08.2009 | 191,360,000 | 48,000,000 | Machinery | http://www.apg.cn |
| 002285 | SLDC | 28.08.2009 | 217,600,000 | 54,400,000 | Real Estate | http://www.worldunion.com.cn |
| 002286 | BAOLINGBAO | 28.08.2009 | 104,000,000 | 26,000,000 | Food & Beverage | http://www.blb-cn.com |
| 002287 | CheezhengTTM | 28.08.2009 | 406,000,000 | 41,000,000 | Pharmaceuticals | http://www.cheezheng.com.cn |
| 002288 | CHAOHUA TECH | 03.09.2009 | 137,488,000 | 35,200,000 | Electronics | http://www.chaohuatech.com |
| 002289 | SUCCESS | 03.09.2009 | 73,500,000 | 18,500,000 | Electronics | http://www.szsuccess.com.cn |
| 002290 | HSSM | 03.09.2009 | 150,480,000 | 37,800,000 | | http://www.szhssm.com.cn |
| 002291 | SATURDAY | 03.09.2009 | 279,500,000 | 71,500,000 | Textiles & Apparel | http://www.st-sat.com |
| 002292 | Alpha Animation | 10.09.2009 | 256,000,000 | 64,000,000 | Paper & Printing | http://www.gdalpha.com |
| 002293 | LUOLAI | 10.09.2009 | 140,363,100 | 35,100,000 | Textiles & Apparel | http://www.luolai.com.cn |
| 002294 | Salubris | 10.09.2009 | 227,000,000 | 56,998,000 | Pharmaceuticals | http://www.salubris.cn |
| 002295 | JINGYI INC. | 29.09.2009 | 141,200,000 | 36,000,000 | Metals & Non -metals | http://www.jingyimetal.com |
| 002296 | Huihuang | 29.09.2009 | 104,550,000 | 26,350,000 | IT | http://www.hhkj.cn |
| 002297 | BOYUN | 29.09.2009 | 214,000,000 | 54,000,000 | Machinery | http://www.hnboyun.com.cn |
| 002298 | XINLONG | 29.09.2009 | 165,000,000 | 42,000,000 | Machinery | http://www.ah-xinlong.com |
| 002299 | Sunner | 21.10.2009 | 410,000,000 | 41,000,000 | Agriculture | http://www.sunnercn.com |
| 002300 | Sun Cable | 21.10.2009 | 201,000,000 | 51,000,001 | Machinery | http://www.npcable.com |

== 2301–2400 ==
| Code | Short-name | Listing date | Issued capital | Negotiable capital | Industry | Http |
|---|---|---|---|---|---|---|
| 002301 | COMIX | 21.10.2009 | 186,799,999 | 46,800,000 | Paper & Printing | http://www.comix.com.cn |
| 002302 | WEST CONSTRUCTION | 03.11.2009 | 210,000,000 | 52,500,000 | Metals & Non -metals | http://www.west-construction.com |
| 002303 | MYS | 03.11.2009 | 178,800,000 | 45,000,000 | Paper & Printing | http://www.szmys.com |
| 002304 | YANGHE | 06.11.2009 | 450,000,000 | 44,999,300 | Food & Beverage | https://web.archive.org/web/20140625034714/http://chinayanghe.com/ |
| 002305 | LANGOLD REAL ESTATE | 06.11.2009 | 480,000,000 | 48,000,000 | Real Estate | http://www.langold.com.cn |
| 002306 | Xiangeqing | 11.11.2009 | 200,000,000 | 50,000,000 | Social Services | https://web.archive.org/web/20140517011854/http://xeq.com.cn/ |
| 002307 | BEIXIN | 11.11.2009 | 189,450,000 | 47,500,000 | Construction | http://www.xjbxlq.com |
| 002308 | VTRON | 27.11.2009 | 427,600,000 | 106,900,000 | IT | http://www.vtron.com |
| 002309 | Zhongli Sci-Tech | 27.11.2009 | 240,300,000 | 60,300,000 | Machinery | http://www.zhongli.com |
| 002310 | DFYL | 27.11.2009 | 75,121,950 | 21,750,000 | Construction | http://www.orientscape.com |
| 002311 | Haid Group | 27.11.2009 | 291,200,000 | 72,800,000 | Food & Beverage | http://www.haid.com.cn |
| 002312 | Santai Electronics | 03.12.2009 | 118,300,000 | 30,000,000 | Machinery | http://www.isantai.com |
| 002313 | SUNSEA | 03.12.2009 | 100,000,000 | 25,000,000 | IT | http://www.sunseagroup.com |
| 002314 | Yahgee | 03.12.2009 | 290,000,000 | 73,641,000 | Metals & Non -metals | http://www.szyazhi.com |
| 002315 | Focus Tech. | 09.12.2009 | 117,500,000 | 29,380,000 | IT | http://www.made-in-china.com |
| 002316 | KEYBRIDGE | 09.12.2009 | 156,000,000 | 39,000,000 | IT | http://www.keybridge.com.cn |
| 002317 | ZHONGSHENGYAOYE | 11.12.2009 | 120,000,000 | 30,000,000 | Pharmaceuticals | http://www.zspcl.com |
| 002318 | JIULI INC. | 11.12.2009 | 208,000,000 | 52,000,000 | Metals & Non -metals | http://www.jiuli.com |
| 002319 | LETONG SHARE | 11.12.2009 | 100,000,000 | 25,000,000 | Petrochemicals | http://www.letongink.com |
| 002320 | STRAIT SHIPPING | 16.12.2009 | 204,750,000 | 51,350,000 | Transportation | http://www.hnss.net.cn |
| 002321 | Huaying Agricultural | 16.12.2009 | 147,000,000 | 37,000,000 | Agriculture | http://www.hua-ying.com |
| 002322 | Ligong Monitoring | 18.12.2009 | 66,700,000 | 16,700,000 | Machinery | http://www.lgom.com.cn |
| 002323 | ZhongLian Electric | 18.12.2009 | 82,760,000 | 21,000,000 | Machinery | http://www.zl-electronic.com |
| 002324 | PRET | 18.12.2009 | 135,000,000 | 35,000,000 | Petrochemicals | http://www.pret.com.cn |
| 002325 | HONGTAO CO., LTD. | 22.12.2009 | 150,000,000 | 37,500,000 | Construction | http://www.szhongtao.cn |
| 002326 | YONGTAI TECHNOLOGY | 22.12.2009 | 133,500,000 | 33,500,000 | Petrochemicals | http://www.yongtaitech.com |
| 002327 | FUANNA | 30.12.2009 | 133,900,000 | 33,799,000 | Textiles & Apparel | http://www.fuanna.com.cn |
| 002328 | Xinpeng Co.Ltd | 30.12.2009 | 300,000,000 | 75,000,000 | Metals & Non -metals | http://www.xinpeng.com |
| 002329 | Royal Dairy | 06.01.2010 | 107,000,000 | 27,000,000 | Food & Beverage | http://www.gxhsry.com |
| 002330 | Delisi | 06.01.2010 | 251,000,000 | 62,999,400 | Food & Beverage | http://www.delisi.com.cn |
| 002331 | WANTONG TECH | 06.01.2010 | 71,411,600 | 18,200,000 | IT | https://web.archive.org/web/20190512164758/http://www.wantong-tech.net/ |
| 002332 | XJZY | 12.01.2010 | 341,400,000 | 85,400,000 | Pharmaceuticals | http://www.xjpharma.com |
| 002333 | LPSK | 12.01.2010 | 250,880,000 | 62,720,000 | Metals & Non -metals | http://www.lpsk.com.cn |
| 002334 | INVT | 13.01.2010 | 64,000,000 | 16,000,000 | Machinery | http://www.invt.com.cn |
| 002335 | KEHUA HENGSHENG | 13.01.2010 | 78,000,000 | 19,500,000 | Machinery | http://www.kehua.com.cn |
| 002336 | RENRENLE | 13.01.2010 | 400,000,000 | 100,000,000 | Wholesale & Retail | http://www.renrenle.cn |
| 002337 | TST | 15.01.2010 | 120,000,000 | 30,000,000 | Machinery | http://www.chinarpm.com |
| 002338 | UP OPTOTECH | 15.01.2010 | 80,000,000 | 20,000,000 | Machinery | http://www.up-china.com |
| 002339 | IESLAB | 22.01.2010 | 86,000,000 | 22,000,000 | IT | http://www.ieslab.com.cn |
| 002340 | GEM | 22.01.2010 | 121,316,000 | 30,329,000 | Mining | http://www.GEMHI-TECH.COM |
| 002341 | SELEN | 22.01.2010 | 73,200,000 | 19,000,000 | Petrochemicals | http://www.szselen.com |
| 002342 | JULI INC. | 26.01.2010 | 480,000,000 | 60,000,000 | | http://www.julisling.com |
| 002343 | HEXIN | 26.01.2010 | 99,060,000 | 25,000,000 | Petrochemicals | http://www.hexin-puleather.com |
| 002344 | CHN Leather Market | 26.01.2010 | 280,000,000 | 70,000,000 | Conglomerates | http://www.zgpgc.com |
| 002345 | CHJ | 28.01.2010 | 180,000,000 | 45,000,000 | | http://www.chjchina.com |
| 002346 | Zhezhong | 28.01.2010 | 135,000,000 | 35,000,000 | Metals & Non -metals | http://www.ch-zzcc.com |
| 002347 | Taier Heavy Industry | 28.01.2010 | 104,000,000 | 26,000,000 | Machinery | http://www.taier.info |
| 002348 | Goldlok Holdings | 03.02.2010 | 148,000,000 | 38,000,000 | Paper & Printing | http://www.goldlok.com |
| 002349 | JINGHUA PHARM | 03.02.2010 | 80,000,000 | 20,000,000 | Pharmaceuticals | http://www.ntjhzy.com |
| 002350 | CREAT | 03.02.2010 | 128,400,000 | 32,400,000 | Machinery | http://www.creat-da.com.cn |
| 002351 | Edifier | 05.02.2010 | 147,000,000 | 37,000,000 | Electronics | http://www.edifier.com |
| 002352 | DINGTAI | 05.02.2010 | 77,830,780 | 19,500,000 | Metals & Non -metals | http://www.dingtaicn.com |
| 002353 | Jereh Group | 05.02.2010 | 114,818,000 | 29,000,000 | Mining | http://www.jereh.com |
| 002354 | KMMY | 09.02.2010 | 93,500,000 | 23,500,000 | Timber & Furnishings | http://www.kemianwood.com |
| 002355 | XINGMIN WHEEL | 09.02.2010 | 210,400,000 | 52,600,000 | Machinery | http://www.xingmin.com |
| 002356 | HND | 09.02.2010 | 80,000,000 | 20,000,000 | Machinery | http://www.szhnd.com |
| 002357 | Fulin Transportation | 10.02.2010 | 97,965,324 | 25,200,000 | Transportation | http://www.scflyy.cn |
| 002358 | SENYUAN ELECTRIC | 10.02.2010 | 86,000,000 | 22,000,000 | Machinery | http://www.hnsyec.com |
| 002359 | QIXING TOWER | 10.02.2010 | 109,000,000 | 27,500,000 | Metals & Non -metals | http://www.QXTT.com |
| 002360 | TOND | 03.03.2010 | 60,000,000 | 15,000,000 | Petrochemicals | http://www.tondchem.com |
| 002361 | Shenjian Gufen | 03.03.2010 | 80,000,000 | 20,000,000 | Petrochemicals | http://www.shen-jian.com.cn |
| 002362 | Hanvon | 03.03.2010 | 107,051,396 | 27,000,000 | IT | http://www.hanwang.com.cn |
| 002363 | LJJX | 05.03.2010 | 120,000,000 | 30,000,000 | Machinery | |
| 002364 | ZHONGHENG ELECTRIC | 05.03.2010 | 66,800,000 | 16,800,000 | Machinery | http://www.hzzh.com |
| 002365 | YONGAN INC. | 05.03.2010 | 93,500,000 | 23,500,000 | Food & Beverage | http://www.chinataurine.com |
| 002366 | DANFU COMPRESSOR | 12.03.2010 | 133,500,000 | 33,500,000 | Machinery | http://www.scdanfu.cn |
| 002367 | KLDT | 12.03.2010 | 160,200,000 | 40,200,000 | Machinery | http://www.canny-elevator.com |
| 002368 | Taiji Co., Ltd | 12.03.2010 | 98,789,200 | 25,000,000 | IT | http://www.taiji.com.cn |
| 002369 | ZOWEE | 16.03.2010 | 100,000,000 | 25,000,000 | Electronics | http://www.zowee.com.cn |
| 002370 | Yatai pharm | 16.03.2010 | 120,000,000 | 30,000,000 | Pharmaceuticals | http://www.ytyaoye.com |
| 002371 | sevenstar | 16.03.2010 | 65,000,000 | 16,560,000 | Electronics | http://www.sevenstar.com.cn |
| 002372 | WEIXING NBM | 18.03.2010 | 253,400,000 | 63,400,000 | Petrochemicals | http://www.china-pipes.com |
| 002373 | LXYY | 18.03.2010 | 68,530,000 | 17,500,000 | IT | http://www.surekam.com |
| 002374 | Lipeng | 18.03.2010 | 53,500,000 | 13,500,000 | Metals & Non -metals | http://www.lp.com.cn |
| 002375 | YASHA | 23.03.2010 | 211,000,000 | 53,000,000 | Construction | http://www.yashazs.com |
| 002376 | SNBC | 23.03.2010 | 150,000,000 | 38,000,000 | IT | http://www.newbeiyang.com.cn |
| 002377 | Guochuang Hi-tech | 23.03.2010 | 107,000,000 | 27,000,000 | Petrochemicals | http://www.guochuang.com.cn |
| 002378 | Zhangyuan Tungsten | 31.03.2010 | 428,213,646 | 43,000,000 | Metals & Non -metals | http://www.zy-tungsten.com |
| 002379 | LOFTEN | 31.03.2010 | 77,500,000 | 19,500,000 | Metals & Non -metals | http://www.loften.com.cn |
| 002380 | Keyuan Corporation | 31.03.2010 | 68,000,000 | 17,000,000 | Machinery | http://www.sciyon.com |
| 002381 | DOUBLE ARROW | 02.04.2010 | 78,000,000 | 20,000,000 | Petrochemicals | http://www.doublearrow.net |
| 002382 | BLUE SAIL | 02.04.2010 | 80,000,000 | 20,000,000 | Petrochemicals | http://www.bluesail.cn |
| 002383 | UniStrong | 02.04.2010 | 120,000,000 | 30,000,000 | IT | http://www.UniStrong.com |
| 002384 | DSBJ | 09.04.2010 | 160,000,000 | 40,000,000 | Metals & Non -metals | http://www.sz-dsbj.com |
| 002385 | DBN | 09.04.2010 | 400,800,000 | 60,800,000 | Food & Beverage | http://www.dbn.com.cn |
| 002386 | YBTY | 09.04.2010 | 479,771,290 | 120,000,000 | Petrochemicals | http://www.ybty.com |
| 002387 | BLACKCOW FOOD | 13.04.2010 | 133,500,000 | 33,500,000 | Food & Beverage | http://www.blackcow.cn |
| 002388 | SUNYES | 13.04.2010 | 111,000,000 | 28,000,000 | Electronics | http://www.sunyes.cn |
| 002389 | NANYANG TECH | 13.04.2010 | 67,000,000 | 17,000,000 | Electronics | http://www.nykj.cc |
| 002390 | xinbang phar. | 16.04.2010 | 86,800,000 | 21,700,000 | Pharmaceuticals | http://www.xinbang.com |
| 002391 | CHANGQING | 16.04.2010 | 98,920,000 | 25,000,000 | Petrochemicals | http://www.jscq.com |
| 002392 | BJLE | 23.04.2010 | 135,000,000 | 33,750,000 | Metals & Non -metals | http://www.bjlirr.com |
| 002393 | lishengpharma | 23.04.2010 | 182,454,992 | 46,000,000 | Pharmaceuticals | http://www.lishengpharma.com |
| 002394 | Lianfa Corporation | 23.04.2010 | 107,900,000 | 27,000,000 | Textiles & Apparel | http://www.lianfa.cn |
| 002395 | DOUBLE ELEPHANT | 29.04.2010 | 89,403,000 | 22,500,000 | Petrochemicals | http://www.sxcxgf.com |
| 002396 | STAR-NET | 23.06.2010 | 175,530,000 | 35,200,000 | IT | http://www.star-net.cn |
| 002397 | MENDALE | 29.04.2010 | 63,000,000 | 16,000,000 | Textiles & Apparel | http://www.mendale.com |
| 002398 | Building Research | 06.05.2010 | 120,000,000 | 24,000,000 | | http://www.xmabr.com |
| 002399 | HEPALINK | 06.05.2010 | 400,100,000 | 32,100,000 | Pharmaceuticals | http://www.hepalink.com |
| 002400 | GDAD | 06.05.2010 | 82,371,755 | 16,480,000 | Social Services | http://www.gdadc.com |

== 2401–2500 ==
| Code | Short-name | Listing date | Issued capital | Negotiable capital | Industry | Http |
|---|---|---|---|---|---|---|
| 002401 | COSCO Shipping Technology | 06.05.2010 | 53,200,000 | 10,640,000 | IT | http://tech.coscoshipping.com |
| 002402 | H&T INTELLIGENT | 11.05.2010 | 66,700,000 | 13,360,000 | Electronics | http://www.szhittech.com |
| 002403 | ASD | 11.05.2010 | 240,000,000 | 48,000,000 | Metals & Non -metals | http://www.chinaasd.com |
| 002404 | Jiaxin silk | 11.05.2010 | 133,500,000 | 26,800,000 | Textiles & Apparel | http://www.jxsilk.cn |
| 002405 | NavInfo | 18.05.2010 | 400,229,579 | 44,800,000 | IT | http://www.navinfo.com |
| 002406 | Yuandong Drive Shaft | 18.05.2010 | 187,000,000 | 37,600,000 | Machinery | http://www.xcyuandong.com |
| 002407 | DFD | 18.05.2010 | 107,000,000 | 21,600,000 | Petrochemicals | http://www.dfdchem.com |
| 002408 | QIXIANG TENGDA | 18.05.2010 | 259,560,000 | 52,000,000 | Petrochemicals | http://www.qxtdgf.com |
| 002409 | Yoke Technology | 25.05.2010 | 110,880,000 | 22,400,000 | Petrochemicals | http://www.yokechem.com |
| 002410 | GLODON | 25.05.2010 | 120,000,000 | 24,000,000 | IT | http://www.glodon.com |
| 002411 | JJJ | 25.05.2010 | 86,000,000 | 17,440,000 | Petrochemicals | http://www.jjjkj.com.cn |
| 002412 | Hansen | 25.05.2010 | 74,000,000 | 15,200,000 | Pharmaceuticals | http://www.hansenzy.com |
| 002413 | CHANGFA | 28.05.2010 | 147,000,000 | 29,600,000 | Machinery | http://www.changfazl.com |
| 002414 | GUIDE INFRARED | 16.07.2010 | 300,000,000 | 60,000,000 | Electronics | http://www.wuhan-guide.com |
| 002415 | HIKVISION | 28.05.2010 | 500,000,000 | 40,000,000 | Electronics | http://www.hikvision.com |
| 002416 | aisidi | 28.05.2010 | 493,300,000 | 40,000,000 | IT | http://www.aisidi.com |
| 002417 | SUNNADA | 01.06.2010 | 120,000,000 | 24,000,000 | IT | http://www.sunnada.com |
| 002418 | KASUN | 01.06.2010 | 143,000,000 | 28,800,000 | Machinery | http://www.kasun.cn |
| 002419 | RAINBOW DEPT. STORE | 01.06.2010 | 400,100,000 | 40,080,000 | Wholesale & Retail | http://www.rainbow.cn |
| 002420 | ECHOM | 01.06.2010 | 401,000,000 | 50,400,000 | Petrochemicals | http://www.echom.com |
| 002421 | DAS | 03.06.2010 | 78,000,000 | 16,000,000 | IT | http://www.chn-das.com |
| 002422 | KELUN PHARMA | 03.06.2010 | 240,000,000 | 48,000,000 | Pharmaceuticals | http://www.kelun.com |
| 002423 | ZYSCO | 03.06.2010 | 465,510,000 | 63,200,000 | Machinery | https://web.archive.org/web/20180815011148/http://www.zssw.com/ |
| 002424 | GZBL | 03.06.2010 | 147,000,000 | 29,600,000 | Pharmaceuticals | http://www.gzbl.com |
| 002425 | KAISER | 08.06.2010 | 107,000,000 | 21,600,000 | Textiles & Apparel | http://www.kaiser.com.cn |
| 002426 | Victory Precision | 08.06.2010 | 400,410,000 | 32,080,000 | Electronics | http://www.vicsz.com |
| 002427 | UNIFULL | 08.06.2010 | 183,227,600 | 36,794,000 | Petrochemicals | http://www.unifull.com |
| 002428 | Yunnan Germanium | 08.06.2010 | 125,600,000 | 25,600,000 | Metals & Non -metals | http://www.sino-ge.com |
| 002429 | MTC | 10.06.2010 | 472,542,500 | 44,800,000 | Electronics | http://www.szmtc.com.cn |
| 002430 | HANGYANG LIMITED | 10.06.2010 | 401,000,000 | 56,800,000 | Machinery | http://www.hangyang.com |
| 002431 | PALM LANDSCAPE | 10.06.2010 | 120,000,000 | 24,000,000 | Construction | http://www.palm-la.com |
| 002432 | Andon Health | 10.06.2010 | 124,000,000 | 24,800,000 | Machinery | http://www.jiuan.com |
| 002433 | PBZY | 18.06.2010 | 100,000,000 | 20,000,000 | Pharmaceuticals | http://www.pibao.cn |
| 002434 | WANLIYANG | 18.06.2010 | 170,000,000 | 34,000,000 | Machinery | http://www.zjwly.com |
| 002435 | CJRF | 18.06.2010 | 132,000,000 | 26,400,000 | Machinery | http://www.runfa-machinery.cn |
| 002436 | FASTPRINT | 18.06.2010 | 111,700,000 | 22,344,000 | Electronics | http://www.chinafastprint.com |
| 002437 | Gloria Pharm | 23.06.2010 | 140,000,000 | 28,000,000 | Pharmaceuticals | http://www.gloria.cc |
| 002438 | Shentong Valve | 23.06.2010 | 104,000,000 | 20,800,000 | Machinery | http://www.stfm.cn |
| 002439 | VenusTech | 23.06.2010 | 98,759,123 | 20,000,000 | IT | http://www.venustech.com.cn |
| 002440 | runtu | 06.07.2010 | 295,000,000 | 59,056,000 | Petrochemicals | http://www.runtuchem.com |
| 002441 | Zhongyeda | 06.07.2010 | 116,000,000 | 23,200,000 | Wholesale & Retail | http://www.zyd.cn |
| 002442 | LXCIC | 06.07.2010 | 200,000,000 | 40,000,000 | Petrochemicals | http://www.hb-lx.com.cn |
| 002443 | KINGLAND PIPELINE | 06.07.2010 | 133,500,000 | 26,800,000 | Metals & Non -metals | http://www.chinakingland.com |
| 002444 | GREATSTAR | 13.07.2010 | 253,500,000 | 50,800,000 | Metals & Non -metals | http://www.greatstartools.com |
| 002445 | ZNHI | 13.07.2010 | 123,000,000 | 24,800,000 | Machinery | http://www.znhi.com.cn |
| 002446 | Shenglu | 13.07.2010 | 102,152,737 | 20,800,000 | IT | http://www.shenglu.com. |
| 002447 | YI QIAO SEEDS | 13.07.2010 | 67,000,000 | 13,600,000 | Agriculture | http://www.dlyiqiao.com |
| 002448 | ZYNP | 16.07.2010 | 92,510,461 | 18,800,000 | Machinery | http://www.hnzynp.com |
| 002449 | NATIONSTAR | 16.07.2010 | 215,000,000 | 44,000,000 | Electronics | http://www.nationstar.com |
| 002450 | KDX | 16.07.2010 | 161,600,000 | 32,320,000 | Petrochemicals | http://www.kangdexin.com |
| 002451 | MORN ELECTRIC | 20.07.2010 | 146,400,000 | 29,280,000 | Machinery | http://www.morncable.com |
| 002452 | CGJT | 20.07.2010 | 100,000,000 | 20,000,000 | Machinery | http://www.gykg.cn |
| 002453 | TM Specialty Chem | 20.07.2010 | 120,000,000 | 24,000,000 | Petrochemicals | http://www.tianmachem.com |
| 002454 | SONGZ | 20.07.2010 | 240,000,000 | 48,000,000 | Machinery | http://www.shsongz.com.cn |

== 2501–2600 ==
| Code | Name | Listing date | Issued capital | Negotiable capital | Industry | Http |
|---|---|---|---|---|---|---|
| 002570 | Beingmate | – | – | – | – | – |

== 2601–2700 ==
| Code | Short-name | Listing date | Issued capital | Negotiable capital | Industry | Http |
|---|---|---|---|---|---|---|
| 002622 | YDJT | 2011 | – | – | – | https://web.archive.org/web/20160827012307/http://www.jlydjt.com |

== ChiNext 300001–300101 ==
| Code | Name | Listing date | Issued capital | Negotiable capital | Industry | Http |
|---|---|---|---|---|---|---|
| 300001 | Qingdao TGOOD Electric | 2009-10-30 | 400,800,000 | 385,680,000 | C Manufacturing | http://www.qdtgood.com |
| 300002 | Beijing Ultrapower Software | 2009-10-30 | 1,323,195,383 | 723,391,056 | I IT | http://www.ultrapower.com.cn |
| 300003 | Lepu Medical Technology | 2009-10-30 | 812,000,000 | 686,106,725 | C Manufacturing | http://en.lepumedical.com |
| 300004 | NanFeng Ventilator | 2009-10-30 | 188,000,000 | 137,475,384 | C Manufacturing | http://www.ntfan.com |
| 300005 | TOREAD | 2009-10-30 | 510,250,166 | 322,060,260 | C Manufacturing | http://www.toread.com.cn |
| 300006 | Chongqing LUMMY Pharmaceutical | 2009-10-30 | 201,793,757 | 124,656,597 | C Manufacturing | |
| 300007 | Henan Hanwei Electronics | 2009-10-30 | 118,000,000 | 82,473,497 | C Manufacturing | https://www.hwsensor.com/ |
| 300008 | Shanghai Bestway | 2009-10-30 | 249,971,674 | 168,228,238 | M Research & Development | |
| 300009 | Anhui ANKE Biotech | 2009-10-30 | 290,358,978 | 184,482,649 | C Manufacturing | https://www.ankebio.com/english/ |
| 300010 | LANXUM | 2009-10-30 | 263,197,333 | 174,131,518 | I IT | https://www.lanxum.com/ |
| 300011 | Beijjing Dinghan Tech | 2009-10-30 | 417,533,399 | 318,694,192 | C Manufacturing | http://www.dinghantech.com/en/index.html |
| 300012 | CTI | 2009-10-30 | 370,326,000 | 203,473,016 | M Research & Development | |
| 300013 | XNWL | 2009-10-30 | 90,000,000 | 90,000,000 | G Transportation | |
| 300014 | EVE Energy | 2009-10-30 | 398,281,300 | 311,928,972 | C Manufacturing | https://www.evepower.com/ |
| 300015 | Aier Eye Hospital | 2009-10-30 | 652,528,606 | 522,873,396 | Q Public Health | |
| 300016 | Beilu Pharmaceutical | 2009-10-30 | 311,273,808 | 253,639,114 | C Manufacturing | |
| 300017 | WANGSU | 2009-10-30 | 313,672,989 | 212,490,519 | I IT | |
| 300018 | ZYHD | 2009-10-30 | 195,000,000 | 153,108,750 | C Manufacturing | |
| 300019 | GUIBAO | 2009-10-30 | 163,200,000 | 107,454,240 | C Manufacturing | |
| 300020 | Enjoyor Tech | 2009-10-30 | 275,269,196 | 241,073,277 | I IT | |
| 300021 | DAYU WATER-SAVING | 2009-10-30 | 278,600,000 | 167,508,154 | C Manufacturing | |
| 300022 | GIFORE | 2009-10-30 | 357,400,000 | 315,657,197 | F Wholesale & Retail | |
| 300023 | BODE | 2009-10-30 | 90,000,000 | 49,753,125 | C Manufacturing | |
| 300024 | SIASUN Robot & Automation | 2009-10-30 | 297,660,000 | 288,249,833 | C Manufacturing | |
| 300025 | Hangzhou Huaxing Chuangye Communication Tech | 2009-10-30 | 214,265,281 | 109,005,088 | I IT | |
| 300026 | Tianjin Chase Sun Pharm. | 2009-10-30 | 573,030,477 | 418,240,530 | C Manufacturing | |
| 300027 | Huayi Brothers | 2009-10-30 | 1,237,643,204 | 866,854,425 | R Media | |
| 300028 | GEEYA (removed 2016) | 2009-10-30 | 266,310,000 | 209,070,450 | C Manufacturing | |
| 300029 | TLPE | 2009-12-25 | 200,000,000 | 193,456,708 | C Manufacturing | |
| 300030 | IMPROVE MEDICAL | 2009-12-25 | 296,000,000 | 241,063,870 | C Manufacturing | |
| 300031 | Wuxi Boton Tech | 2009-12-25 | 300,000,000 | 213,833,660 | C Manufacturing | |
| 300032 | JINLONG INC | 2009-12-25 | 285,400,000 | 262,330,000 | C Manufacturing | |
| 300033 | Hithink RoyalFlush | 2009-12-25 | 268,800,000 | 130,130,640 | I IT | |
| 300034 | Gaona Aero Material | 2009-12-25 | 211,988,154 | 211,988,154 | C Manufacturing | |
| 300035 | Hunan Zhongke Electric | 2009-12-25 | 179,887,500 | 119,353,490 | C Manufacturing | |
| 300036 | SuperMap | 2009-12-25 | 122,309,680 | 89,713,800 | I IT | |
| 300037 | Shenzhen Capchem Tech | 2010-01-08 | 171,200,000 | 101,068,752 | C Manufacturing | https://en.capchem.com/ |
| 300038 | METENO (dropped 2022) | 2010-01-08 | 160,809,389 | 102,447,136 | C Manufacturing | |
| 300039 | Shanghai Kaibao | 2010-01-08 | 631,296,000 | 467,433,270 | C Manufacturing | |
| 300040 | Harbin Jiuzhou | 2010-01-08 | 277,800,000 | 198,448,500 | C Manufacturing | |
| 300041 | HUITIAN NEW MATERIAL | 2010-01-08 | 168,954,920 | 129,350,296 | C Manufacturing | |
| 300042 | Netac | 2010-01-08 | 133,600,000 | 75,319,750 | C Manufacturing | https://www.netac.com/ |
| 300043 | Rastar | 2010-01-20 | 565,544,728 | 187,641,250 | C Manufacturing | https://www.rastar.com/html/toys-wap-en/ |
| 300044 | Sunwin | 2010-01-20 | 224,860,000 | 147,331,188 | I IT | |
| 300045 | HWA CREATE | 2010-01-20 | 268,000,000 | 155,095,250 | C Manufacturing | |
| 300046 | TECHSEM | 2010-01-20 | 142,080,000 | 106,800,000 | C Manufacturing | |
| 300047 | TYDIC | 2010-01-20 | 318,408,907 | 223,266,603 | I IT | |
| 300048 | HICONICS | 2010-01-20 | 338,144,800 | 241,327,300 | C Manufacturing | |
| 300049 | FREE CO., LTD | 2010-01-20 | 129,832,000 | 109,479,211 | C Manufacturing | |
| 300050 | DINGLI COMM | 2010-01-20 | 216,000,000 | 131,995,666 | I IT | |
| 300051 | 35.COM | 2010-02-11 | 321,000,000 | 203,880,638 | I IT | |
| 300052 | ZQGame | 2010-02-11 | 260,000,000 | 260,000,000 | I IT | |
| 300053 | OBT | 2010-02-11 | 200,000,000 | 158,099,750 | C Manufacturing | |
| 300054 | Hubei Dinglong | 2010-02-11 | 439,527,607 | 279,666,173 | C Manufacturing | https://en.dl-kg.com/ |
| 300055 | WBD | 2010-02-26 | 228,800,000 | 171,844,625 | E Construction | |
| 300056 | SAVINGS | 2010-02-26 | 149,760,000 | 113,809,957 | C Manufacturing | |
| 300057 | WANSHUNGUFEN | 2010-02-26 | 422,000,000 | 246,609,687 | C Manufacturing | |
| 300058 | BLUEFOCUS | 2010-02-26 | 948,105,250 | 523,418,790 | L Business Support | |
| 300059 | East Money | 2010-03-19 | 1,209,600,000 | 916,024,169 | I IT | |
| 300061 | CONANT OPTICS | 2010-03-19 | 153,600,000 | 89,093,760 | C Manufacturing | |
| 300062 | Ceepower | 2010-03-19 | 154,510,000 | 77,631,400 | C Manufacturing | https://m.ceepower.com/en/ |
| 300063 | TLJT | 2010-03-26 | 100,500,000 | 56,873,233 | C Manufacturing | |
| 300064 | SC DIAMOND (dropped 2022) | 2010-03-26 | 608,000,000 | 575,550,016 | C Manufacturing | |
| 300065 | HLX | 2010-03-26 | 210,505,940 | 160,809,922 | C Manufacturing | |
| 300066 | SANCHUAN INC | 2010-03-26 | 249,543,100 | 231,324,279 | C Manufacturing | |
| 300067 | ANOKY | 2010-04-21 | 327,132,000 | 186,355,570 | C Manufacturing | |
| 300068 | Narada Power Source | 2010-04-21 | 600,555,509 | 405,826,962 | C Manufacturing | https://en.naradapower.com/ |
| 300069 | JINLIHUA ELECTRIC | 2010-04-21 | 117,000,000 | 59,680,768 | C Manufacturing | |
| 300070 | Beijing Originwater | 2010-04-21 | 892,076,870 | 539,174,525 | N Environmental Protection | |
| 300071 | SPEARHEAD | 2010-04-21 | 348,384,510 | 222,222,206 | L Business Support | |
| 300072 | SJEP | 2010-04-27 | 505,804,000 | 458,551,552 | C Manufacturing | |
| 300073 | EASPRING | 2010-04-27 | 160,000,000 | 158,696,523 | C Manufacturing | http://www.easpring.com.cn/english/ |
| 300074 | AVCON | 2010-04-27 | 330,000,000 | 214,272,750 | I IT | |
| 300075 | EGOVA | 2010-04-27 | 189,000,000 | 121,616,048 | I IT | |
| 300076 | GQY | 2010-04-30 | 212,000,000 | 171,329,976 | C Manufacturing | |
| 300077 | Nations Tech | 2010-04-30 | 272,000,000 | 252,224,275 | C Manufacturing | https://www.nationstech.com/en/gongsixinxi5/ |
| 300078 | CENTURY | 2010-04-30 | 167,500,000 | 80,681,875 | C Manufacturing | |
| 300079 | SUMAVISION | 2010-04-30 | 682,554,631 | 582,867,591 | C Manufacturing | |
| 300080 | XINDAXIN MATERIALS | 2010-06-25 | 502,804,021 | 317,164,205 | C Manufacturing | |
| 300081 | HXYD | 2010-05-20 | 134,000,000 | 84,670,377 | F Wholesale & Retail | |
| 300082 | Liaoning Oxiranchem | 2010-05-20 | 336,960,000 | 336,921,000 | C Manufacturing | http://en.oxiranchem.com/ |
| 300083 | JANUS | 2010-05-20 | 201,304,700 | 87,873,700 | C Manufacturing | |
| 300084 | HAIMO | 2010-05-20 | 128,000,000 | 101,552,553 | B Mining | |
| 300085 | Shenzhen InfoGem Tech | 2010-05-26 | 242,660,000 | 124,567,224 | I IT | |
| 300086 | HONZ | 2010-05-26 | 300,000,000 | 106,034,484 | C Manufacturing | |
| 300087 | Winall Hi-tech Seed | 2010-05-26 | 158,400,000 | 106,794,639 | A Agriculture | |
| 300088 | TOKEN SCI | 2010-05-26 | 513,702,341 | 380,426,250 | C Manufacturing | |
| 300089 | GREAT WALL GUANGDONG | 2010-06-25 | 150,000,000 | 86,507,250 | C Manufacturing | |
| 300090 | SHENGYUN MACHINERY (dropped 2020) | 2010-06-25 | 529,494,535 | 351,228,006 | C Manufacturing | |
| 300091 | Jin Tong Ling Tech | 2010-06-25 | 209,000,000 | 126,397,101 | C Manufacturing | https://www.jtl-tech.com/ |
| 300092 | COMELEC | 2010-07-08 | 91,000,000 | 52,736,162 | C Manufacturing | |
| 300093 | Gansu Jingan Solar | 2010-07-08 | 216,000,000 | 215,263,500 | C Manufacturing | |
| 300094 | GUOLIAN AQUATIC | 2010-07-08 | 352,000,000 | 350,722,067 | A Agriculture | |
| 300095 | Jiangxi Huawu Brake | 2010-07-28 | 204,586,000 | 151,060,000 | C Manufacturing | https://en.hua-wu.com/ |
| 300096 | YLZINFO | 2010-07-28 | 172,000,000 | 129,797,500 | I IT | |
| 300097 | ZY AUTOMATION | 2010-07-28 | 120,996,336 | 75,588,711 | C Manufacturing | |
| 300098 | GOSUN | 2010-07-28 | 184,020,000 | 113,225,805 | C Manufacturing | |
| 300099 | UROICA | 2010-08-06 | 214,599,453 | 69,272,836 | C Manufacturing | |
| 300100 | Ningbo Shuanglin Auto Parts | 2010-08-06 | 280,500,000 | 267,000,000 | C Manufacturing | http://www.autolin.com/about.html |
| 300101 | Chengdu CORPRO Tech | 2010-08-06 | 278,000,000 | 217,969,399 | C Manufacturing | |

== ChiNext 300102–300201 ==
| Code | Name | Listing date | Issued capital | Negotiable capital | Industry | Http |
|---|---|---|---|---|---|---|
| 300102 | CHANGELIGHT | 2010-08-12 | 295,000,000 | 182,162,300 | C Manufacturing | https://www.changelight.com.cn/index_En.aspx |
| 300103 | DAGANG ROAD MACHINE | 2010-08-12 | 211,734,000 | 155,105,045 | C Manufacturing | |
| 300104 | LETV (dropped 2020) | 2010-08-12 | 837,165,635 | 474,089,083 | I IT | |
| 300105 | LONGYUAN TECHNOLOGY | 2010-08-20 | 285,120,000 | 285,120,000 | C Manufacturing | |
| 300106 | WESTERN ANIMAL | 2010-08-20 | 117,000,000 | 116,384,818 | A Agriculture | |
| 300107 | JIANXIN CHEMICAL | 2010-08-20 | 267,600,000 | 167,100,000 | C Manufacturing | |
| 300108 | SHUANGLONG CHEMICAL | 2010-08-25 | 135,200,000 | 81,087,646 | C Manufacturing | |
| 300109 | Boai NKY Medical | 2010-08-25 | 115,200,000 | 68,729,675 | C Manufacturing | http://eng.boai-nky.com/ |
| 300110 | HRYY | 2010-08-25 | 672,527,235 | 645,466,365 | C Manufacturing | |
| 300111 | SUNFLOWER | 2010-08-27 | 1,119,800,000 | 1,107,598,057 | C Manufacturing | http://www.sunowe.com |
| 300112 | Shenzhen Maxonic Automation | 2010-08-27 | 241,751,250 | 154,700,466 | C Manufacturing | |
| 300113 | SW-TECH | 2010-08-27 | 290,400,000 | 170,389,556 | I IT | |
| 300114 | Zemic | 2010-08-27 | 156,000,000 | 156,000,000 | C Manufacturing | https://en.zemic.com.cn/ |
| 300115 | Everwin Precision Tech | 2010-09-02 | 516,000,000 | 512,519,952 | C Manufacturing | http://en.ewpt.com/ |
| 300116 | J&R FIRE PROTECTION (dropped 2024) | 2010-09-02 | 240,000,000 | 155,320,530 | C Manufacturing | |
| 300117 | JIAYU STOCK | 2010-09-02 | 325,800,000 | 325,800,000 | E Construction | |
| 300118 | RISEN ENERGY | 2010-09-02 | 560,000,000 | 379,829,360 | C Manufacturing | |
| 300119 | RPSW | 2010-09-17 | 389,146,281 | 203,091,722 | C Manufacturing | |
| 300120 | JWEW | 2010-09-17 | 205,899,997 | 110,261,211 | C Manufacturing | |
| 300121 | YANGGU HUATAI | 2010-09-17 | 280,800,000 | 158,023,276 | C Manufacturing | |
| 300122 | Chongqing Zhifei Bio | 2010-09-28 | 800,000,000 | 321,451,250 | C Manufacturing | https://en.zhifeishengwu.com/ |
| 300123 | SUNBIRD YACHT | 2010-09-28 | 288,897,318 | 261,642,568 | C Manufacturing | |
| 300124 | INOVANCE | 2010-09-28 | 781,358,027 | 609,138,567 | C Manufacturing | |
| 300125 | EAST NEW ENERGY | 2010-10-13 | 118,000,000 | 72,662,367 | M Research & Development | |
| 300126 | RQGF | 2010-10-13 | 303,120,000 | 157,415,904 | C Manufacturing | |
| 300127 | GALAXY MAGNETS | 2010-10-13 | 323,146,360 | 221,864,890 | C Manufacturing | https://www.galaxymagnets.com/ |
| 300128 | JINFU NEW MATERIAL | 2010-10-13 | 408,818,000 | 403,568,000 | C Manufacturing | |
| 300129 | TSP | 2010-10-19 | 324,000,000 | 219,533,754 | C Manufacturing | |
| 300130 | XINGUODU | 2010-10-19 | 114,300,000 | 64,181,250 | C Manufacturing | |
| 300131 | YITOA INTELLIGENT | 2010-10-19 | 205,284,991 | 122,679,474 | C Manufacturing | |
| 300132 | GREEN PINE | 2010-10-26 | 192,960,000 | 111,644,304 | C Manufacturing | |
| 300133 | HUACE FILM & TV | 2010-10-26 | 646,848,318 | 427,902,175 | R Media | |
| 300134 | Tatfook Technology | 2010-10-26 | 320,000,000 | 293,000,000 | C Manufacturing | https://en.tatfook.com/ |
| 300135 | BLAC | 2010-10-26 | 512,000,000 | 363,583,056 | C Manufacturing | |
| 300136 | Sunway Comm | 2010-11-05 | 137,325,000 | 98,890,461 | C Manufacturing | https://en.sz-sunway.com/ |
| 300137 | Hebei Sailhero Enviro | 2010-11-05 | 202,800,000 | 164,863,473 | C Manufacturing | |
| 300138 | CHENGUANG BIOTECH | 2010-11-05 | 179,570,872 | 127,963,430 | C Manufacturing | |
| 300139 | FXXC E-TECH | 2010-11-12 | 109,600,000 | 84,544,225 | C Manufacturing | |
| 300140 | QIYUAN EQUIPMENT | 2010-11-12 | 122,000,000 | 115,348,157 | C Manufacturing | |
| 300141 | HSDQ | 2010-11-12 | 166,483,200 | 105,482,569 | C Manufacturing | |
| 300142 | WALVAX | 2010-11-12 | 234,000,000 | 157,908,094 | C Manufacturing | |
| 300143 | STARWAY COMPANY | 2010-12-09 | 147,400,000 | 105,879,202 | A Agriculture | |
| 300144 | SONGCHENG | 2010-12-09 | 557,815,000 | 195,537,605 | N Environmental Protection | |
| 300145 | NANFANG PUMP | 2010-12-09 | 261,163,800 | 172,535,092 | C Manufacturing | |
| 300146 | BY-HEALTH | 2010-12-15 | 658,001,940 | 328,891,517 | C Manufacturing | |
| 300147 | Xiangxue Pharmaceutical | 2010-12-15 | 391,979,484 | 386,629,716 | C Manufacturing | |
| 300148 | TANGEL PUBLISHING | 2010-12-15 | 351,959,591 | 78,288,042 | R Media | http://www.t-angel.com |
| 300149 | QHT | 2010-12-22 | 301,500,000 | 176,932,125 | C Manufacturing | http://www.qht.cc |
| 300150 | IREAL | 2010-12-22 | 270,000,000 | 178,864,236 | I IT | http://www.c-real.com.cn |
| 300151 | CHANGHONG TECH | 2010-12-22 | 100,500,000 | 53,162,906 | C Manufacturing | http://www.sz-changhong.com |
| 300152 | COMBUSTION CONTROL | 2010-12-29 | 240,178,400 | 237,600,000 | C Manufacturing | http://www.xcc.com.cn |
| 300153 | COOLTECH | 2010-12-29 | 160,000,000 | 159,835,000 | C Manufacturing | |
| 300154 | RLGF | 2010-12-29 | 223,500,000 | 155,703,075 | C Manufacturing | |
| 300155 | ANJUBAO | 2011-01-07 | 182,953,300 | 88,847,213 | C Manufacturing | |
| 300156 | TIANLI | 2011-01-07 | 288,720,000 | 233,673,921 | C Manufacturing | |
| 300157 | LANDOCEAN | 2011-01-07 | 398,468,518 | 256,873,806 | B Mining | |
| 300158 | ZHENDONG PHARMACY | 2011-01-07 | 288,000,000 | 115,658,413 | C Manufacturing | |
| 300159 | XYGF | 2011-01-07 | 360,800,000 | 281,531,360 | C Manufacturing | |
| 300160 | XIUQIANG GLASS | 2011-01-13 | 186,800,000 | 186,800,000 | C Manufacturing | |
| 300161 | HCNC | 2011-01-13 | 161,745,000 | 153,793,940 | C Manufacturing | |
| 300162 | LMGD | 2011-01-13 | 134,000,000 | 82,730,000 | C Manufacturing | |
| 300163 | APLUS | 2011-01-13 | 79,000,000 | 47,639,622 | C Manufacturing | |
| 300164 | TONG OIL TOOLS | 2011-01-13 | 380,160,000 | 258,240,091 | B Mining | |
| 300165 | SKYRAY INSTRUMENT | 2011-01-25 | 153,920,000 | 88,955,000 | C Manufacturing | |
| 300166 | BONC | 2011-01-25 | 135,720,988 | 79,605,000 | I IT | |
| 300167 | DVSX | 2011-01-25 | 300,240,000 | 145,243,125 | I IT | |
| 300168 | WONDERS INFORMATION | 2011-01-25 | 487,134,400 | 478,658,352 | I IT | |
| 300169 | TIANSHENG | 2011-01-25 | 280,500,000 | 172,354,990 | C Manufacturing | |
| 300170 | HAND | 2011-02-01 | 264,672,111 | 193,393,435 | I IT | |
| 300171 | TOFFLON | 2011-02-01 | 208,000,000 | 105,625,000 | C Manufacturing | |
| 300172 | CEC Enviro | 2011-02-01 | 169,000,000 | 94,787,954 | N Environmental Protection | |
| 300173 | SOTECH | 2011-02-01 | 113,230,000 | 81,495,866 | C Manufacturing | |
| 300174 | YUANLI ACTIVE CARBON | 2011-02-01 | 136,000,000 | 65,944,388 | C Manufacturing | |
| 300175 | LONTRUE | 2011-02-15 | 470,800,000 | 464,793,505 | C Manufacturing | |
| 300176 | HONGTEO | 2011-02-15 | 107,280,000 | 107,280,000 | C Manufacturing | |
| 300177 | HI-TARGET | 2011-02-15 | 403,897,600 | 235,584,832 | C Manufacturing | |
| 300178 | TEMPUS GLOBAL (dropped 2022) | 2011-02-15 | 244,800,000 | 153,920,000 | L Business Support | |
| 300179 | SF DIAMOND | 2011-02-15 | 216,000,000 | 133,011,268 | C Manufacturing | |
| 300180 | HUAFON MICROFIBRE | 2011-02-22 | 158,000,000 | 115,313,075 | C Manufacturing | |
| 300181 | ZUO LI YAO YE | 2011-02-22 | 316,800,000 | 224,120,492 | C Manufacturing | |
| 300182 | JETSEN | 2011-02-22 | 464,979,422 | 225,747,762 | I IT | |
| 300183 | DRZB | 2011-02-22 | 222,495,795 | 125,970,795 | I IT | |
| 300184 | P&S | 2011-02-22 | 150,075,000 | 111,178,632 | F Wholesale & Retail | |
| 300185 | TONGYU HEAVY | 2011-03-08 | 900,000,000 | 701,451,301 | C Manufacturing | |
| 300186 | DAHUANONG | 2011-03-08 | 534,000,000 | 395,179,287 | C Manufacturing | |
| 300187 | YONKER | 2011-03-08 | 200,340,000 | 197,392,300 | N Environmental Protection | |
| 300188 | MEIYAPICO INC. | 2011-03-16 | 221,813,200 | 121,679,605 | I IT | |
| 300189 | GRAND AGRISEEDS | 2011-03-16 | 256,000,000 | 208,968,000 | A Agriculture | |
| 300190 | WELLE INC. | 2011-03-16 | 155,397,600 | 63,515,520 | N Environmental Protection | |
| 300191 | SINOGEO | 2011-03-16 | 320,000,000 | 148,820,000 | B Mining | |
| 300192 | KINGSWOOD | 2011-03-22 | 110,250,000 | 68,062,500 | C Manufacturing | |
| 300193 | JASIC | 2011-03-22 | 221,500,000 | 152,092,818 | C Manufacturing | |
| 300194 | FUAN PHARM | 2011-03-22 | 260,130,000 | 128,802,718 | C Manufacturing | |
| 300195 | MKM | 2011-03-29 | 171,186,189 | 64,447,050 | C Manufacturing | |
| 300196 | CHANGHAI COMPOSITES | 2011-03-29 | 192,000,000 | 108,373,442 | C Manufacturing | |
| 300197 | THST | 2011-03-29 | 505,289,404 | 292,936,793 | E Construction | |
| 300198 | NCP | 2011-04-07 | 209,362,500 | 172,080,925 | C Manufacturing | |
| 300199 | HYBIO | 2011-04-07 | 400,000,000 | 183,378,716 | C Manufacturing | |
| 300200 | COMENS MATERIALS | 2011-04-07 | 213,600,000 | 200,007,342 | C Manufacturing | |
| 300201 | HLZ | 2011-04-07 | 352,000,000 | 350,155,509 | C Manufacturing | |
