= ZW Drive =

Chinese manufacturing company

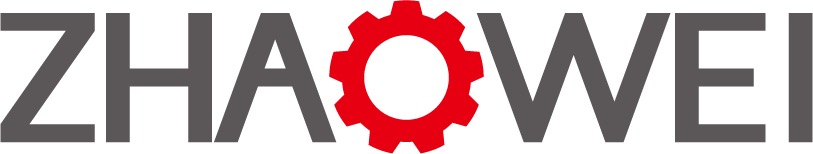

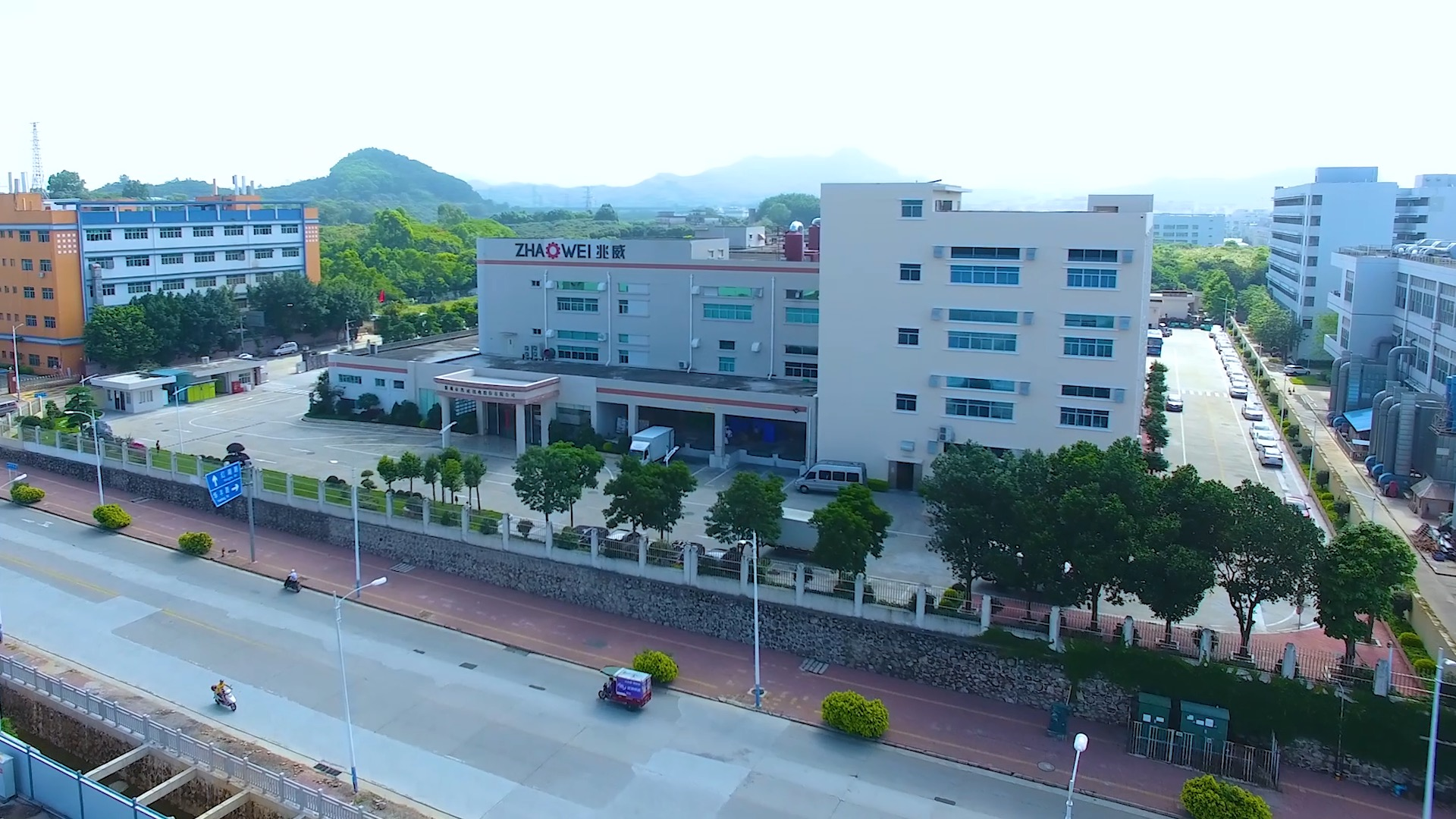
- ZW Drive headquarters in Shenzhen, China
- Company type: Public
- Traded as: SZSE: 003021
- Industry: Electronics
- Founded: 2001; 24 years ago
- Headquarters: Shenzhen, China
- Area served: Worldwide
- Website: www.zwgearbox.com

Shenzhen Zhaowei, commonly known as ZW Drive, is a Shenzhen-based manufacturer of power transmission systems and gearboxes, including micro planetary gearboxes, precision reduction gear boxes, plastic and metal powder-based injection parts and its assemblies. The company also operates five fully owned subsidiaries.

== Company history ==
The company was incorporated in 2001. It is active in micro drive systems, gearboxes, gear motor, encoders, and controls. It reported a net profit of 244.7 million yuan in 2020. Zhaowei is listed on the Shenzhen Stock Exchange, completed its successful initial public offering (IPO) in December 2020.

=== Precision gear mold design and development ===
In terms of gear mold design, after years of technology accumulation, the company has mastered the core key technologies of gear mold cavity design methods and tooth shape correction.

== Recognition ==
- Baoan Great Craftsman Award (2020)
- Guangdong-Hong Kong-Macao Greater Bay Area Enterprise Innovation Ability List (2020)
- National Champion (2021)

== See also ==
- List of companies listed on the Shenzhen Stock Exchange
