= Beilu Pharmaceutical =

Beijing Beilu Pharmaceutical Co., Ltd.
- Short name: Beilu
- Company type: Public
- Traded as: SZSE: 300016
- Industry: Pharmaceutical
- Founded: 1992
- Headquarters: Beijing
- Area served: Worldwide

Beilu Pharmaceutical
- Simplified Chinese: 北陆药业
- Traditional Chinese: 北陸藥業
- Revenue: ▲CN¥983 million (2024)
- Website: beilupharma.com

Beilu Pharmaceutical, also known as Beilu Pharma, simply referred to as Beilu, is a Chinese pharmaceutical company founded in 1992. It went public on the Shenzhen Stock Exchange in 2009 and underwritten by UBS. Prior to that, it was listed on the NEEQ. In 2024, the revenue of the firm reached more than 983 million yuan. It is one of the key players in the global contrast media market.

Headquartered in Beijing, Beilu Pharma was financed by Infotech. It had reached required standards to float shares on the Shenzhen second board market in May 2009. In October, the company officially landed on the ChiNext under the stock code "300016". The company also has an equity stake in Shihe Gene. In 2022, it set up a wholly-owned subsidiary in Hong Kong.

== Products ==
Beilu Pharma mainly produces gadobutrol injections, gadopentetate dimeglumine injections, and Iohexol injections. Jiuwei Zhenxin Granules and Jinlianhua Granules are the company's representative products.

== History ==
Beilu Pharma was set up in 1992. In 2008, it secured more than 66.6 million yuan in funding from investors. In 2009, in its GEM Board IPO, the company raised more than 300 million yuan.

In May 2016, Beilu Pharma established an industry buyout fund worth 610 million yuan. In 2017, its net profit amounted to more than 118 million yuan. In 2020, the company raised $70.42 million.
