= Accelink Technologies =

Chinese optical corporation

Accelink Technologies Corporation is a Chinese optical corporation. The company produces and supplies optical components and subsystems. The company offers optical fiber connectors/adaptors, optical test instruments, micro-optical devices, dispersion compensation modules, subsystems, photo detectors, fiber optical couplers/splitters, optical switches/attenuators, WDM/DWDM/CWDM/OADM modules, and optical amplifiers. It primarily serves telecommunications equipment manufacturers in China, the United States, Canada, Germany, Italy, Japan, Korea, India, and elsewhere internationally. The company was founded in 1976 and is headquartered in Wuhan. It is listed on the Shenzhen Stock Exchange.
