= Household goods =

Goods and products used within households

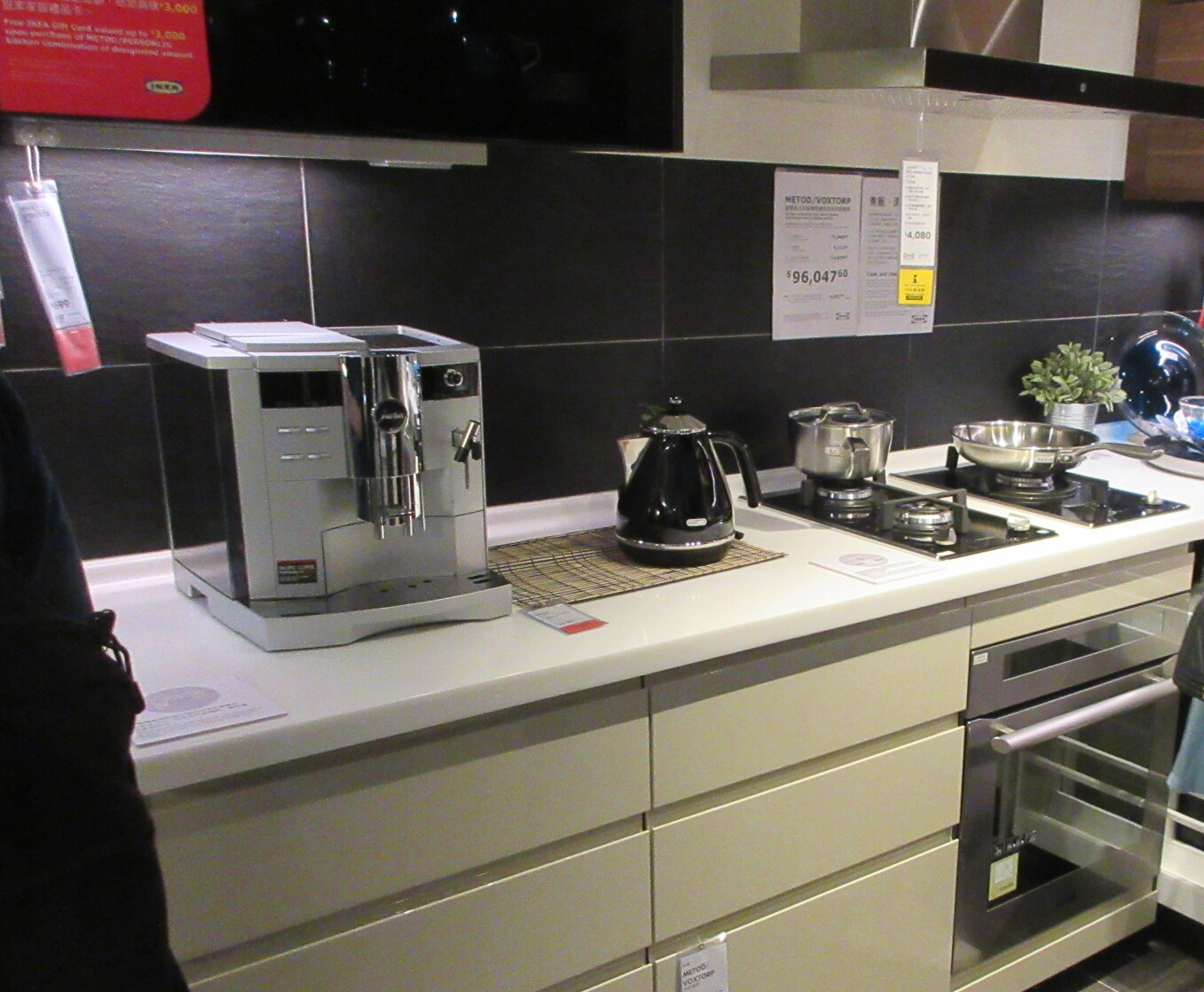
Kitchen furniture and appliances for sale in Ikea in Hong Kong

Household goods are goods and products used within households. They are the tangible and movable personal property placed in the rooms of a house, such as a bed or refrigerator.

== Economic role ==
Businesses that produce household goods are categorized as Cyclical Consumer Products by the Thomson Reuters Business Classification and are organized into three sub-categories:

- Consumer Electronics
- Appliances, tools and housewares
- Home Furnishings (such as furniture)

Household goods are a significant part of a country's economy, with their purchase the topic of magazines such as Consumer Reports, their relocation handled by moving companies, and their disposal or redistribution facilitated by companies like Goodwill Industries, services like classified advertising and Craigslist, and events such as garage sales and car boot sales.

Their safety is often regulated by governments, which also promote and facilitate their import and export.

== Classification ==
Businesses that produce consumer goods for households are categorized as "civilian goods" with a cyclical nature according to Thomson Reuters' business classification. These businesses are divided into three subgroups:

- Consumer electronics
- Housewares, tools and household items
- Home furniture (such as furniture)

=== Consumer electronics ===
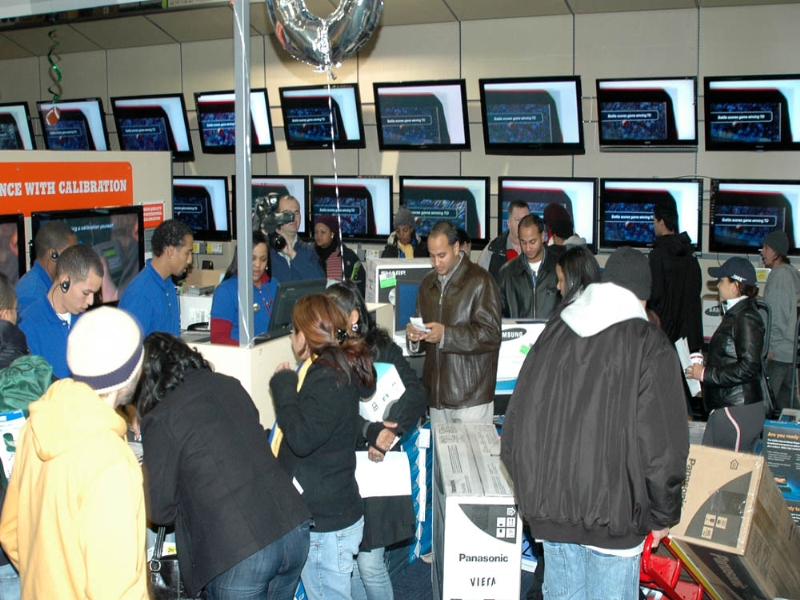
Shoppers at the flat-screen TV section of a Best Buy store

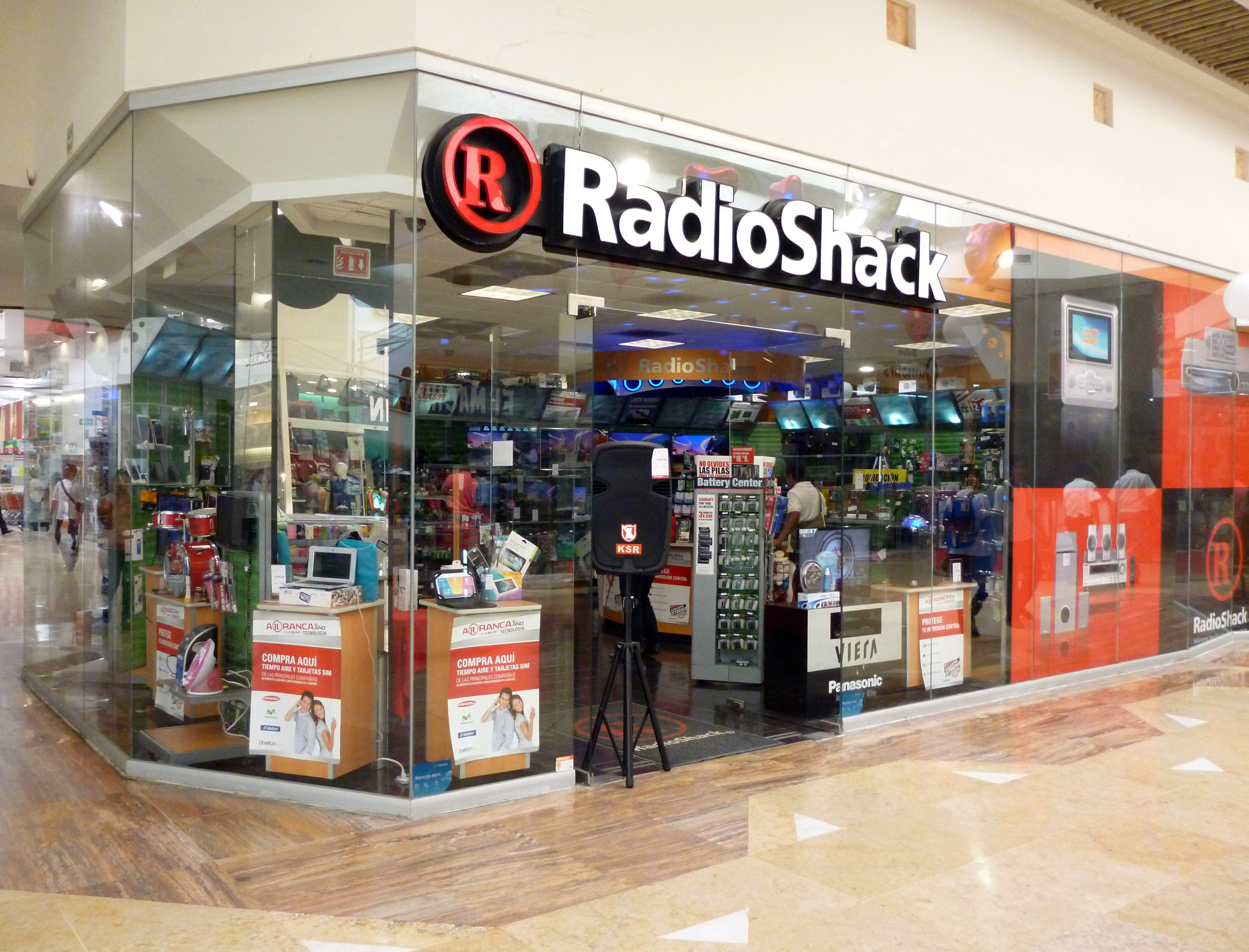
A Radio Shack consumer electronics store in a mall

Consumer electronics or home electronics are electronic (analog or digital) equipment intended for everyday use, typically in private homes. Consumer electronics include devices used for entertainment, communications and recreation. Usually referred to as black goods due to many products being housed in black or dark casings. This term is used to distinguish them from "white goods" which are meant for housekeeping tasks, such as washing machines and refrigerators, although nowadays, these would be considered black goods, some of these being connected to the Internet. In British English, they are often called brown goods by producers and sellers. (Note: "Brown" from the bakelite and wood-veneer finishes typical on 1950s and 1960s radio and TV receivers, and in contrast to "white goods".) In the 2010s, this distinction is absent in large big box consumer electronics stores, which sell entertainment, communication and home office devices, light fixtures and appliances, including the bathroom type.

Radio broadcasting in the early 20th century brought the first major consumer product, the broadcast receiver. Later products included telephones, televisions, and calculators, then audio and video recorders and players, game consoles, mobile phones, personal computers and MP3 players. In the 2010s, consumer electronics stores often sell GPS, automotive electronics (car stereos), video game consoles, electronic musical instruments (e.g., synthesizer keyboards), karaoke machines, digital cameras, and video players (VCRs in the 1980s and 1990s, followed by DVD players and Blu-ray players). Stores also sell smart light fixtures and appliances, digital cameras, camcorders, cell phones, and smartphones. Some of the newer products sold include virtual reality head-mounted display goggles, smart home devices that connect home devices to the Internet, streaming devices, and wearable technology.

In the 2010s, most consumer electronics have become based on digital technologies. They have essentially merged with the computer industry in what is increasingly referred to as the consumerization of information technology. Some consumer electronics stores have also begun selling office and baby furniture. Consumer electronics stores may be "brick and mortar" physical retail stores, online stores, or combinations of both.

Annual consumer electronics sales are expected to reach $2.9 trillion by 2020. It is part of the wider electronics industry. In turn, the driving force behind the electronics industry is the semiconductor industry.

=== Housewares ===
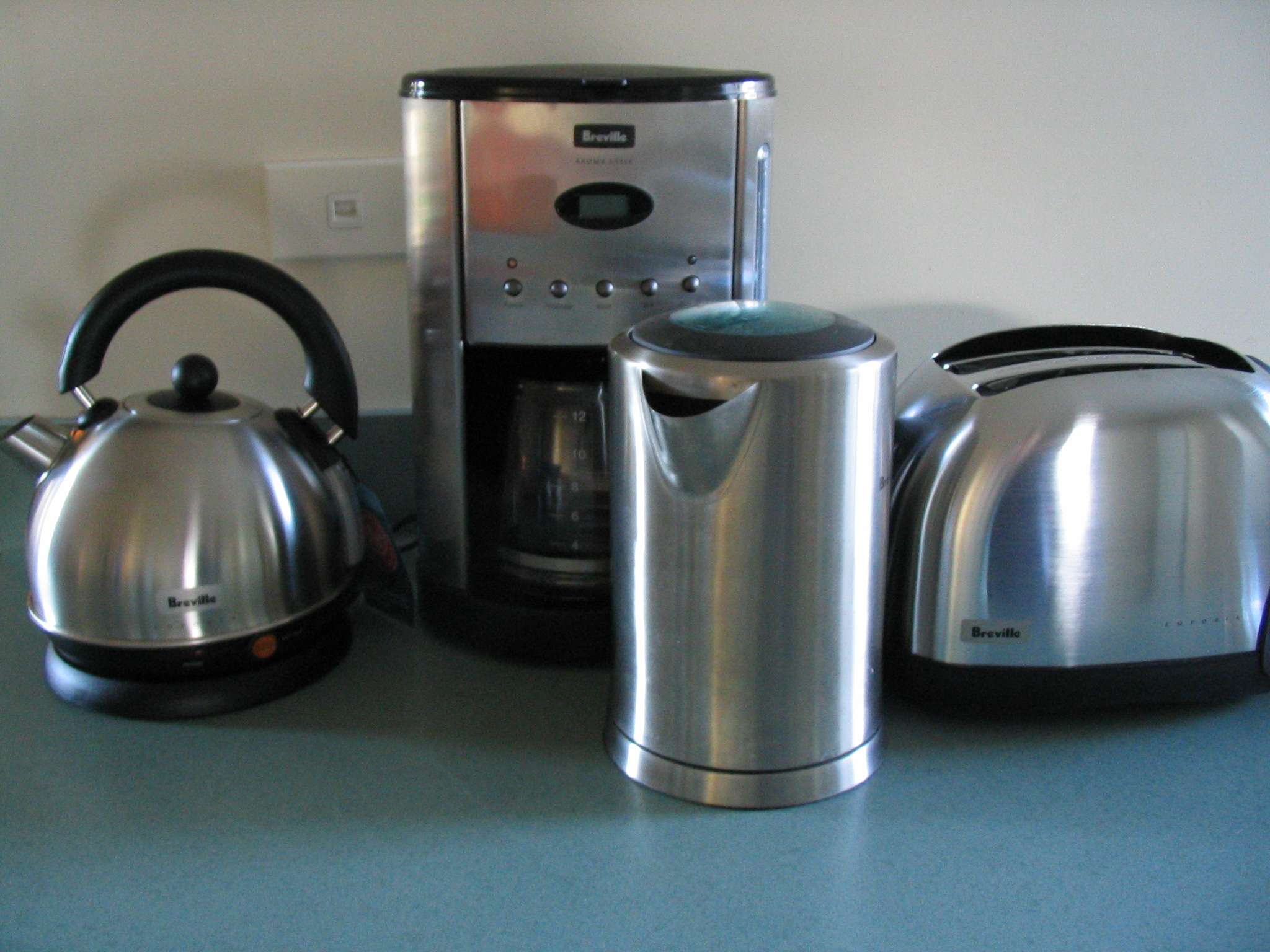
Small electrical appliances in a kitchen

Housewares is a general term referring to objects, items, and equipment equipped and used to serve conveniences and utilities for regular activities for the daily life of a family, household. With their widespread popularity and extensive applications, the concept of "housewares" relates to tools and devices designed to fulfill a specific function or purpose within a household environment.

According to the Collins English Dictionary, "housewares" are defined as "devices or machines, typically electrical, that are used in domestic spaces and are used for cleaning or cooking". However, in a broader sense, most devices used within a household environment, including both consumer electronics and items such as ovens, refrigerators, baking ovens, and air conditioning systems, can be considered as housewares.

=== Furniture ===
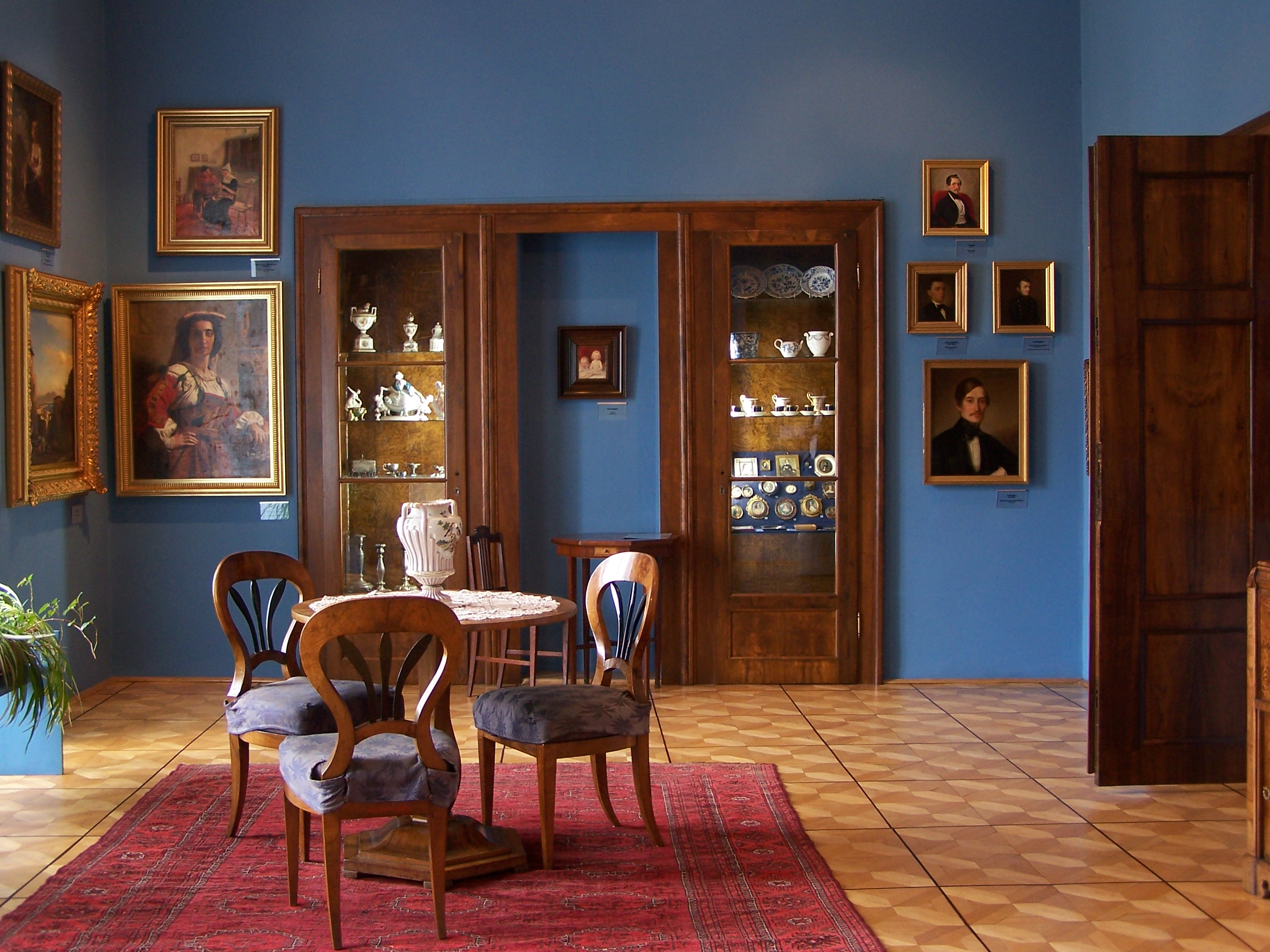
Interior design in a room

Furniture is a term referring to assets and objects arranged and decorated within a house, room, or building, aiming to support human activities in work, study, daily life, and entertainment. Furniture items include chairs, tables, beds, wardrobes, bookcases, tea cabinets, altar cabinets, chests, and wall clocks and can be made from various materials such as wood, metal, and plastic. Wooden furniture is environmentally friendly, improves air quality, and is durable.

== See also ==
- Durable good
- Fast-moving consumer goods
- Home accessories
