= Consumer electronics =

Electronic products for everyday use

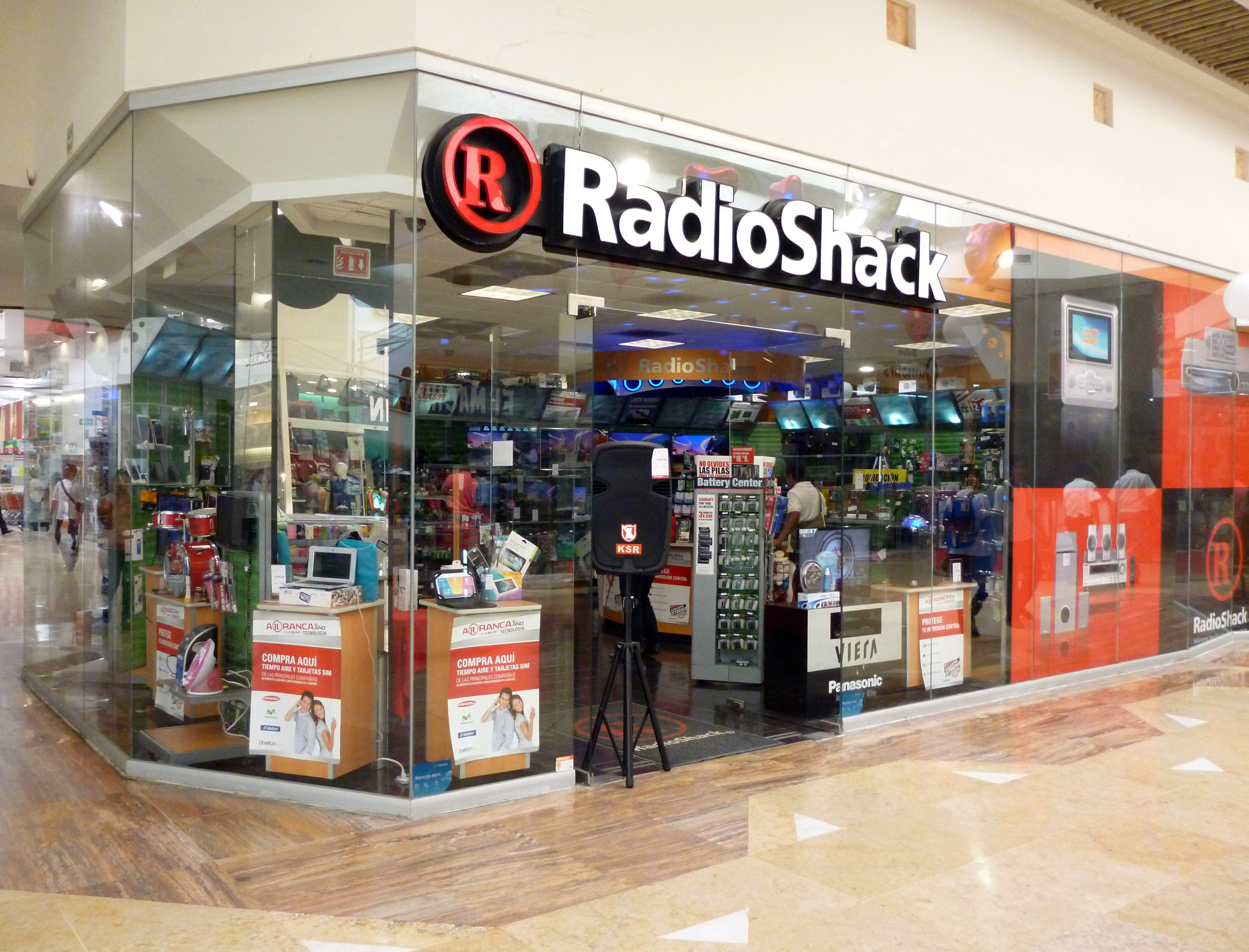
A RadioShack consumer electronics store of the Plaza Caracol shopping centre in Puerto Vallarta, Jalisco, Mexico, in 2014

Consumer electronics, also known as home electronics, are electronic devices intended for everyday household use. Consumer electronics include those used for entertainment, communications, and recreation. Historically, these products were referred to as "black goods" in American English due to many products being housed in black or dark casings. This term is used to distinguish them from "white goods", which are meant for housekeeping tasks, such as washing machines and refrigerators. In British English, they are often called "brown goods" by producers and sellers because they were historically housed in wooden cases. Since the 2010s, this distinction has been absent in big box consumer electronics stores, whose inventories include entertainment, communication, and home office devices, as well as home appliances.

Radio broadcasting in the early 20th century brought the first major consumer product, the broadcast receiver. Later products included telephones, televisions, calculators, cameras, video game consoles, mobile phones, personal computers, and MP3 players. In the 2010s, consumer electronics stores often sold GPS, automotive electronics (vehicle audio), video game consoles, electronic musical instruments such as synthesizer keyboards, karaoke machines, digital cameras, and video players. Such video playing equipment included VCRs in the 1980s and 1990s, and eventually DVD players and Blu-ray players. Stores also sold smart light fixtures, network devices, camcorders, and smartphones. Some of the modern products being sold include virtual reality goggles, smart home devices that connect to the Internet, streaming devices, and wearable technology.

In the 2010s, most consumer electronics were based on digital technologies and increasingly merged with the computer and video game industry, in a trend often referred to as the consumerization of information technology. Some consumer electronics stores also began selling office and baby furniture. Consumer electronics stores may be physical "brick and mortar" retail stores, online stores, or combinations of both. Annual consumer electronics sales were expected to reach $2.9 trillion by 2020. The sector is part of the electronics industry, which is, in turn, driven by the semiconductor industry.

== History ==
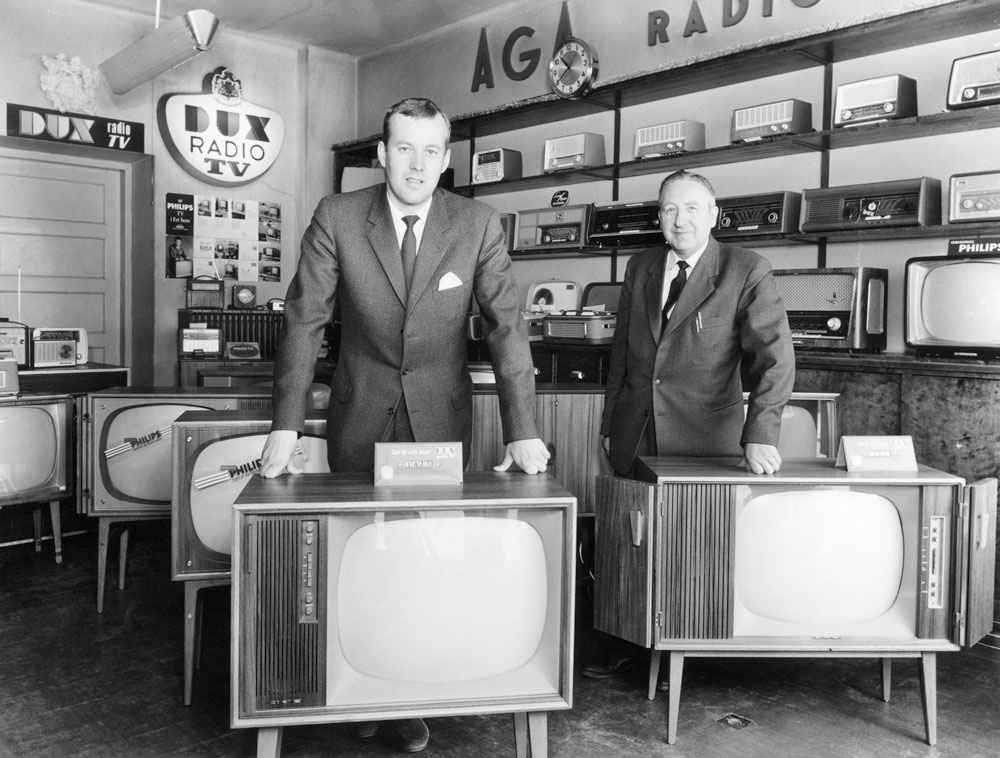
A radio and TV store in 1961

For its first fifty years, the phonograph turntable did not use electronics; the needle and sound horn were purely mechanical technologies. However, in the 1920s, radio broadcasting became the basis of the mass production of radio receivers. The vacuum tubes that had made radios practical were used with record players as well. This was to amplify the sound so that it could be played through a loudspeaker. Television was invented soon after, but remained insignificant in the consumer market in the Global North until the 1950s, after the end of world war 2. Television would not become widely adopted elsewhere worldwide until the 1970s.

The first working transistor, a point-contact transistor, was invented by John Bardeen and Walter Houser Brattain at Bell Labs in 1947, which led to significant research in the field of solid-state semiconductors in the early-1950s. The invention and development of the earliest transistors at Bell led to transistor radios, in turn promoting the emergence of the home entertainment consumer electronics industry starting in the 1950s. This was largely due to the efforts of Tokyo Tsushin Kogyo (now Sony) in successfully commercializing transistor technology for a mass market, with affordable transistor radios and then transistorized television sets.

Integrated circuits (ICs) followed when manufacturers built circuits (usually for military purposes) on a single substrate using electrical connections between circuits within the chip itself. IC technology led to more advanced and cheaper consumer electronics, such as transistorized televisions, pocket calculators, and by the 1980s, video game consoles and personal computers affordable for regular middle-class families.

Beginning in the 1980s and accelerating in the early 2000s, many consumer electronics, such as televisions and stereo systems, underwent digitization. The introduction of compact discs (CDs) and personal computers during this period signalled a broader shift as digital computer technology and digital signals were increasingly integrated into consumer devices. This transformation significantly altered their functionality and led to improved performance, such as enhanced image quality in televisions. These advancements were largely driven by Moore’s Law, which enabled rapid increases in processing power and reductions in cost and size. At the same time in the 2000s, the internet and personal computers were adopted worldwide.

In 2004, the consumer electronics industry was worth US $240 billion annually worldwide, comprising visual equipment, audio equipment, and games consoles. The industry became global, with Asia Pacific having a 35% market share, Europe having 31.5%, the US having 23%, and the rest of the world owning the remainder. Major players in this industry are household names like Sony, Samsung, Philips, Sanyo, and Sharp.

Due to technological convergence, one single device such as a smartphone can perform the tasks of several separate devices such as a camera, radio, TV, video camcorder, etc.

=== White goods ===
The increase in popularity of such domestic appliances as 'white goods' is a characteristic element of consumption patterns during the golden age of the Western economy. Europe's White Goods industry has evolved over the past 40 years, first by changing tariff barriers, and later by technical and demand shifts. The spending on domestic appliances has claimed only a tiny fraction of disposable income, rising from 0.5 percent in the US in 1920 to about 2 percent in 1980. Yet, the sequence of electrical and mechanical durables have altered the activities and experiences of households in America and Britain in the twentieth century. With the expansion of cookers, vacuum cleaners, refrigerators, washing machines, radios, televisions, air conditioning, and microwave ovens, households have gained an escalating number of appliances. Despite the ubiquity of these goods, their diffusion is not well understood. Some types of appliances diffuse more frequently than others. In particular, home entertainment appliances such as radio and television have diffused much faster than household and kitchen machines."

== Products ==
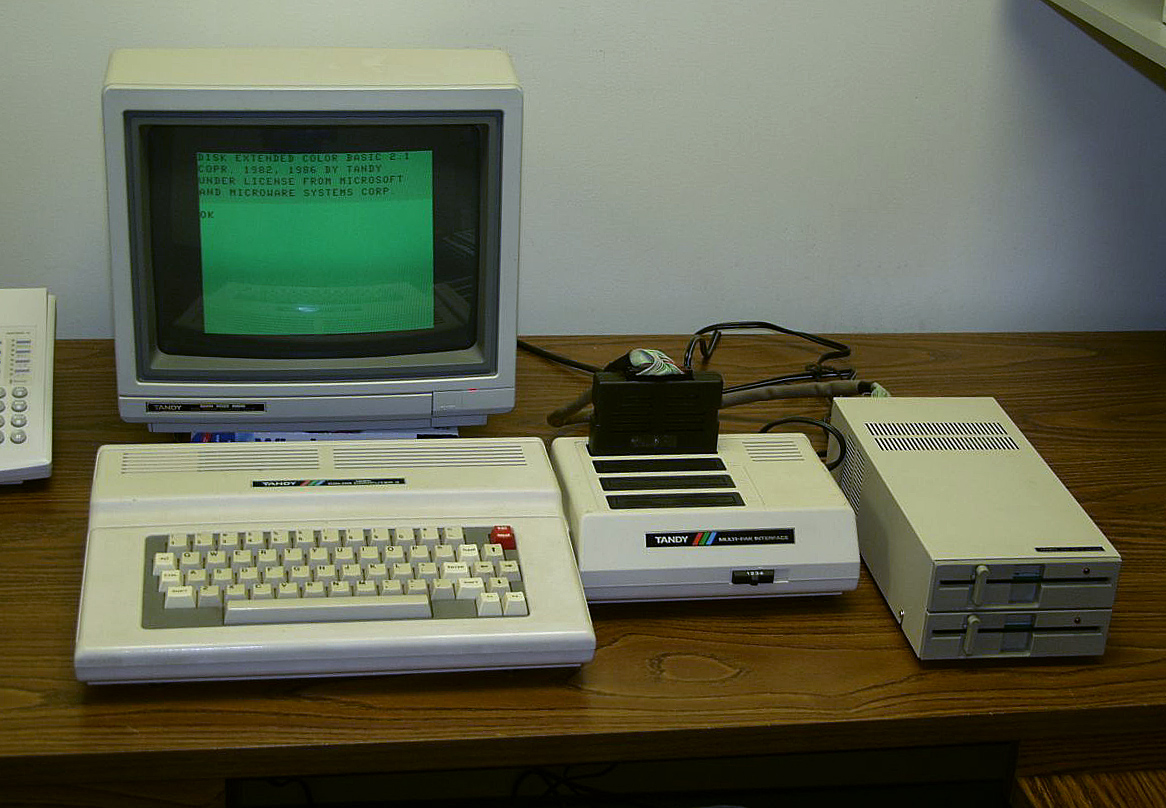
A typical CoCo 3 computer system, from the 1980s

Consumer electronics devices include those used for:

- Entertainment (Flatscreen TVs, television sets, MP3 players, video recorders, DVD players, radio receivers, etc.)
- Communications (telephones, mobile phones, email-capable personal computers, desktop computers, laptops, printers, paper shredders, etc.)
- Recreation (digital cameras, camcorders, video game consoles, ROM cartridges, radio-controlled cars, robot kits, etc.).

Consumer electronics products such as the digital distribution of video games have become increasingly based on the internet and digital technologies. The consumer electronics industry has primarily merged with the software industry in what is increasingly referred to as the consumerization of information technology.

List of top consumer electronics products by number of shipments
Electronic device	Shipments (est.billion)	Production years included	Ref
Compact disc (CD)	200	1982–2007	
Cassette tape	30	1963–2019	
Digital versatile disc (DVD)	20	1996–2012	
Mobile phone	19.4	1994–2018	(Note: Mobile phone: 1994–2010 – 10 billion; Smartphone (2011–2018) – 9.401 billion (Note: Smartphone: 2007–2010 – 731 million; 2011–2013 – 2.122 billion; 2014–2015 – 2.69 billion; 2016–2018 – 4.589 billion))
Smartphone	10.1	2007–2018	
Video cassette (VHS)	10	1976–2000	

=== Trends ===
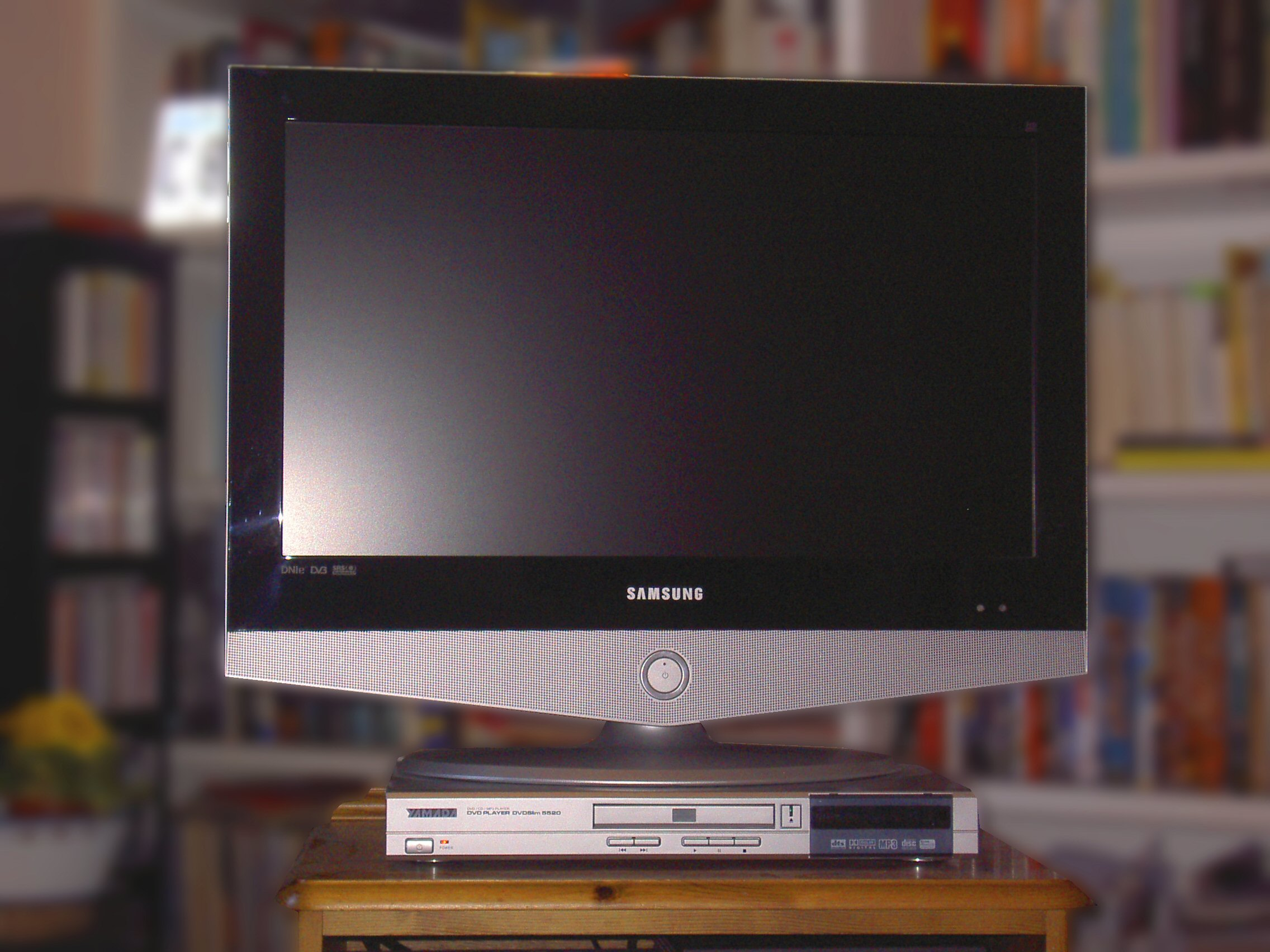
A modern flat panel, HDTV television set

One overriding characteristic of consumer electronic products is the trend of ever-falling prices. This is driven by gains in manufacturing efficiency and automation, lower labor costs as manufacturing has moved to lower-wage countries, and improvements in semiconductor design. Semiconductor components benefit from Moore's law, an observed principle which states that, for a given price, semiconductor functionality doubles every two years.

Although consumer electronics shows a trend towards convergence, consumers still face varied purchasing decisions. Product information therefore needs to remain current and comparable for the consumer to support informed choices. Factors such as style, price, specification, and performance all play a role in these decisions. At the same time, there is a gradual shift towards e-commerce web-storefronts.

Many products include Internet access using technologies such as Wi-Fi, Bluetooth, EDGE, or Ethernet. Products not traditionally associated with computer use (such as TVs or Hi-fi equipment) now provide options to connect to the Internet or to a computer using a home network to provide access to digital content. The desire for high-definition (HD) content has led the industry to develop a number of technologies, such as WirelessHD or ITU-T G.hn, which are optimized for distribution of HD content between consumer electronic devices in a home.

=== Business competition ===
The consumer electronics industry faces consumers with unpredictable tastes on the demand side, supplier-related delays or disruptions on the supply side, and production challenges occurring in the process. The high rate of technology evolution or revolution requires large investments without any guarantee of profitable returns. As a result, the big players rely on global markets to achieve economies of scale. Even these companies sometimes have to cooperate with each other, for instance on standards, to reduce the risk of their investments. In supply chain management, there is much discussion on risks related to such aspects of supply chains as short product lifecycles, high competition combined with cooperation, and globalization. The consumer electronics industry is the very embodiment of these aspects of supply chain management and related risks. While some of the supply and demand related risks are similar to such industries as the toy industry, the consumer electronics industry faces additional risks due to its vertically integrated supply chains. There are also numerous supply-chain-wide contextual risks that cut across the supply chain especially impacting companies with global supply chains. These include cultural differences in multinational operations, environmental risk, regulations risk, and exchange rate risk across multiple countries. Whether or not demand is comparable across countries affects the extent of the gains from international integration. In addition, consumer preferences change over time to disturb existing patterns of behavior. A feature of some industries is that demand for variety increases as the market moves from first-time buying to replacement demand. A resource to further understand this idea of consumer preferences can be observed through Lizabeth Cohen's book titled, "A Consumers' Republic", "Only if we have large demands can we expect large production".

== Industries ==
The electronics industry, especially consumer electronics, emerged in the 20th century and has become a global industry worth billions of dollars. Contemporary society uses all manner of electronic devices built-in automated or semi-automated factories operated by the industry.

=== Manufacturing ===
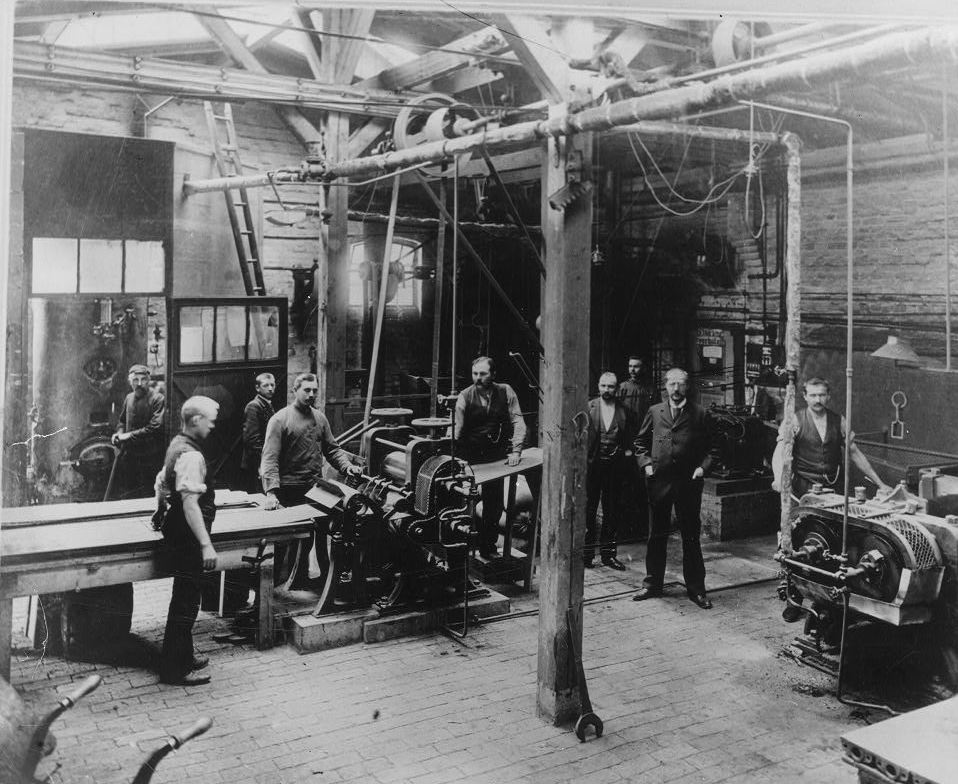
Gramophone factory in Hannover-Nordstadt

Most consumer electronics are manufactured in China, due to maintenance cost, availability of materials, quality, and speed as opposed to other countries such as the United States. Cities such as Shenzhen and Dongguan have become important production centers for the industry, attracting many consumer electronics companies such as Apple Inc.

==== Electronic component ====
An electronic component is any essential discrete device or physical entity in an electronic system used to affect electrons or their associated fields. Electronic components are mostly industrial products, available in a singular form, and are not to be confused with electrical elements, conceptual abstractions representing idealized electronic components.

==== Software development ====
Consumer electronics such as personal computers use various types of software. Embedded software is used within some consumer electronics, such as mobile phones. This type of software may be embedded within the hardware of electronic devices. Some consumer electronics include software that is used on a personal computer in conjunction with electronic devices, such as camcorders and digital cameras, and third-party software for such devices also exists.

==== Standardization ====
Some consumer electronics adhere to protocols, such as connection protocols "to high speed bi-directional signals". In telecommunications, a communications protocol is a system of digital rules for data exchange within or between computers.

=== Trade shows ===
The Consumer Electronics Show (CES) trade show has taken place yearly in Las Vegas, Nevada since its foundation in 1973. The event, which grew from having 100 exhibitors in its inaugural year to more than 4,500 exhibiting companies in its 2020 edition, features the latest in consumer electronics, speeches by industry experts and innovation awards.

The IFA Berlin trade show has taken place in Berlin, Germany since its foundation in 1924. The event features new consumer electronics and speeches by industry pioneers.

=== IEEE initiatives ===
Institute of Electrical and Electronics Engineers (IEEE), the world's largest professional society, has many initiatives to advance the state of the art of consumer electronics. IEEE has a dedicated society of thousands of professionals to promote CE, called the Consumer Electronics Society (CESoc). IEEE has multiple periodicals and international conferences to promote CE and encourage collaborative research and development in CE. The flagship conference of CESoc, called IEEE International Conference on Consumer Electronics (ICCE), is in its 35th year.

- IEEE Transactions on Consumer Electronics
- IEEE Consumer Electronics Magazine
- IEEE International Conference on Consumer Electronics (ICCE)

Institute of Electrical and Electronics Engineers (IEEE) Computer Society also have initiated a conference to research on next generation consumer electronics as Smart Electronics. The conference, named IEEE Symposium on Smart Electronics Systems (IEEE-iSES) is on its 9th year.

=== Retailing ===
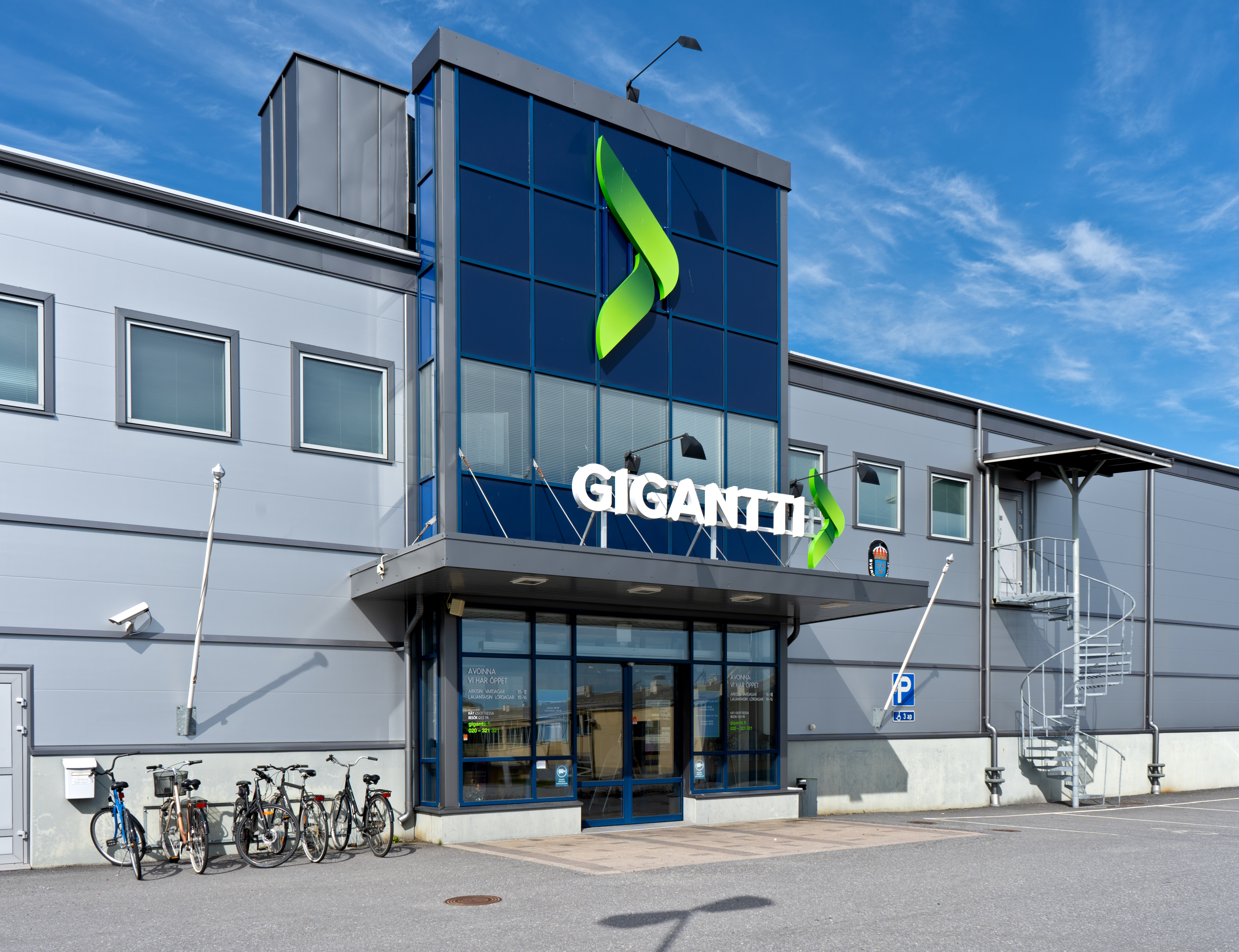
Gigantti store in Kokkola, Finland

Electronics retailing is a significant part of the retail industry in many countries. In the United States, dedicated consumer electronics stores have mostly given way to big-box stores such as Best Buy, the largest consumer electronics retailer in the country, although smaller dedicated stores include Apple Stores, and specialist stores that serve, for example, audiophiles, such as the single-branch B&H Photo store in New York City. Broad-based retailers, such as Walmart and Target, also sell consumer electronics in many of their stores. In April 2014, retail e-commerce sales were the highest in the consumer electronic and computer categories as well. Some consumer electronics retailers offer extended warranties on products with programs such as SquareTrade.

An electronics district is an area of commerce with a high density of retail stores that sell consumer electronics.

=== Service and repair ===
Consumer electronic service can refer to the maintenance of said products. When consumer electronics have malfunctions, they may sometimes be repaired.

In 2013, in Pittsburgh, Pennsylvania, the increased popularity in listening to sound from analog audio devices, such as phonographs, as opposed to digital sound, has sparked a noticeable increase of business for the electronic repair industry there.

=== Mobile phone industry ===
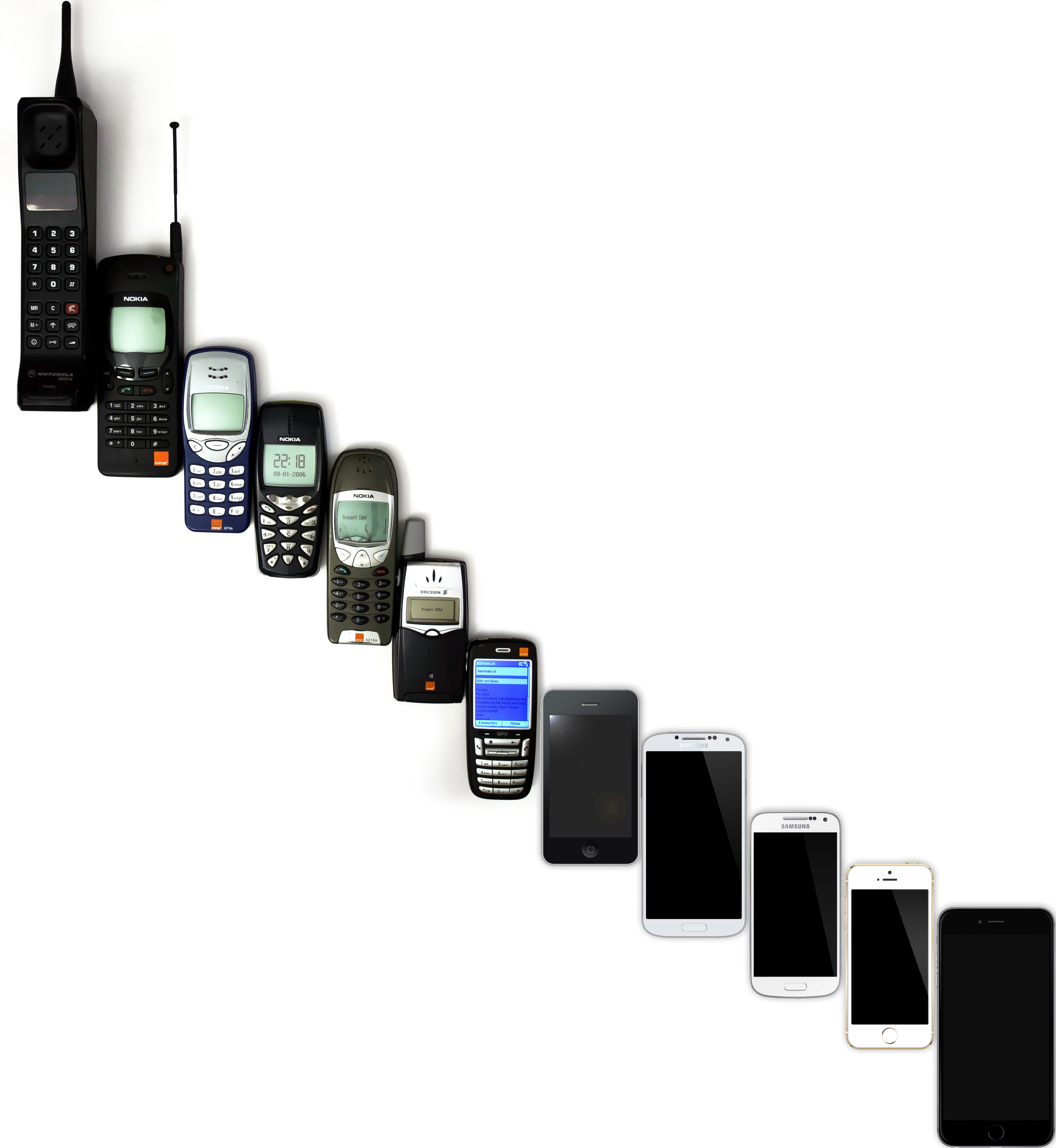
This picture illustrates how the mobile phone industry evolved to what we see today as modern smartphones.

A mobile phone, cellular phone, cell phone, cellphone, handphone, or hand phone, sometimes shortened to simply mobile, cell or just phone, is a portable telephone that can make and receive calls over a radio frequency link while the user is moving within a telephone service area. The radio frequency link establishes a connection to the switching systems of a mobile phone operator, which provides access to the public switched telephone network (PSTN). Modern mobile telephone services use a cellular network architecture and, therefore, mobile telephones are called cellular telephones or cell phones in North America. In addition to telephony, digital mobile phones (2G) support a variety of other services, such as text messaging, MMS, email, Internet access, short-range wireless communications (infrared, Bluetooth), business applications, video games and digital photography. Mobile phones offering only those capabilities are known as feature phones; mobile phones which offer greatly advanced computing capabilities are referred to as smartphones.

A smartphone is a portable device that combines mobile telephone and computing functions into one unit. They are distinguished from feature phones by their stronger hardware capabilities and extensive mobile operating systems, which facilitate wider software, internet (including web navigation over mobile broadband), and multimedia functionality (including music, video, cameras, and gaming), alongside core phone functions such as voice calls and text messaging. Smartphones typically contain a number of MOSFET integrated circuit (IC) chips, include various sensors that can be leveraged by pre-included and third-party software (such as a magnetometer, proximity sensors, barometer, gyroscope, accelerometer and more), and support Wireless communications protocols (such as Bluetooth, Wi-Fi, or satellite navigation).

== Environmental impact ==
Guide to Greener Electronics 2017 findings

In 2017, Greenpeace USA published a study of 17 of the world's leading consumer electronics companies about their energy and resource consumption and the use of chemicals.

=== Rare metals and rare earth elements ===
Electronic devices use thousands of rare metals and rare earth elements (40 on average for a smartphone), these materials are extracted and refined using water and energy-intensive processes. These metals are also used in the renewable energy industry meaning that consumer electronics are directly competing for the raw materials.

=== Energy consumption ===
The energy consumption of consumer electronics and their environmental impact, either from their production processes or the disposal of the devices, is increasing steadily. EIA estimates that electronic devices and gadgets account for about 10%–15% of the energy use in American homes – largely because of their number; the average house has dozens of electronic devices. The energy consumption of consumer electronics increases – in America and Europe – to about 50% of household consumption if the term is redefined to include home appliances such as refrigerators, dryers, clothes washers and dishwashers.

=== Standby power ===
Standby power – used by consumer electronics and appliances while they are turned off – accounts for 5–10% of total household energy consumption, costing $100 annually to the average household in the United States. A study by United States Department of Energy's Berkeley Lab found that videocassette recorders (VCRs) consume more electricity during the course of a year in standby mode than when they are used to record or playback videos. Similar findings were obtained concerning satellite boxes, which consume almost the same amount of energy in "on" and "off" modes.

A 2012 study in the United Kingdom, carried out by the Energy Saving Trust, found that the devices using the most power on standby mode included televisions, satellite boxes, and other video and audio equipment. The study concluded that UK households could save up to £86 per year by switching devices off instead of using standby mode. A report from the International Energy Agency in 2014 found that $80 billion of power is wasted globally per year due to inefficiency of electronic devices. Consumers can reduce unwanted use of standby power by unplugging their devices, using power strips with switches, or by buying devices that are standardized for better energy management, particularly Energy Star-marked products.

=== Electronic waste ===
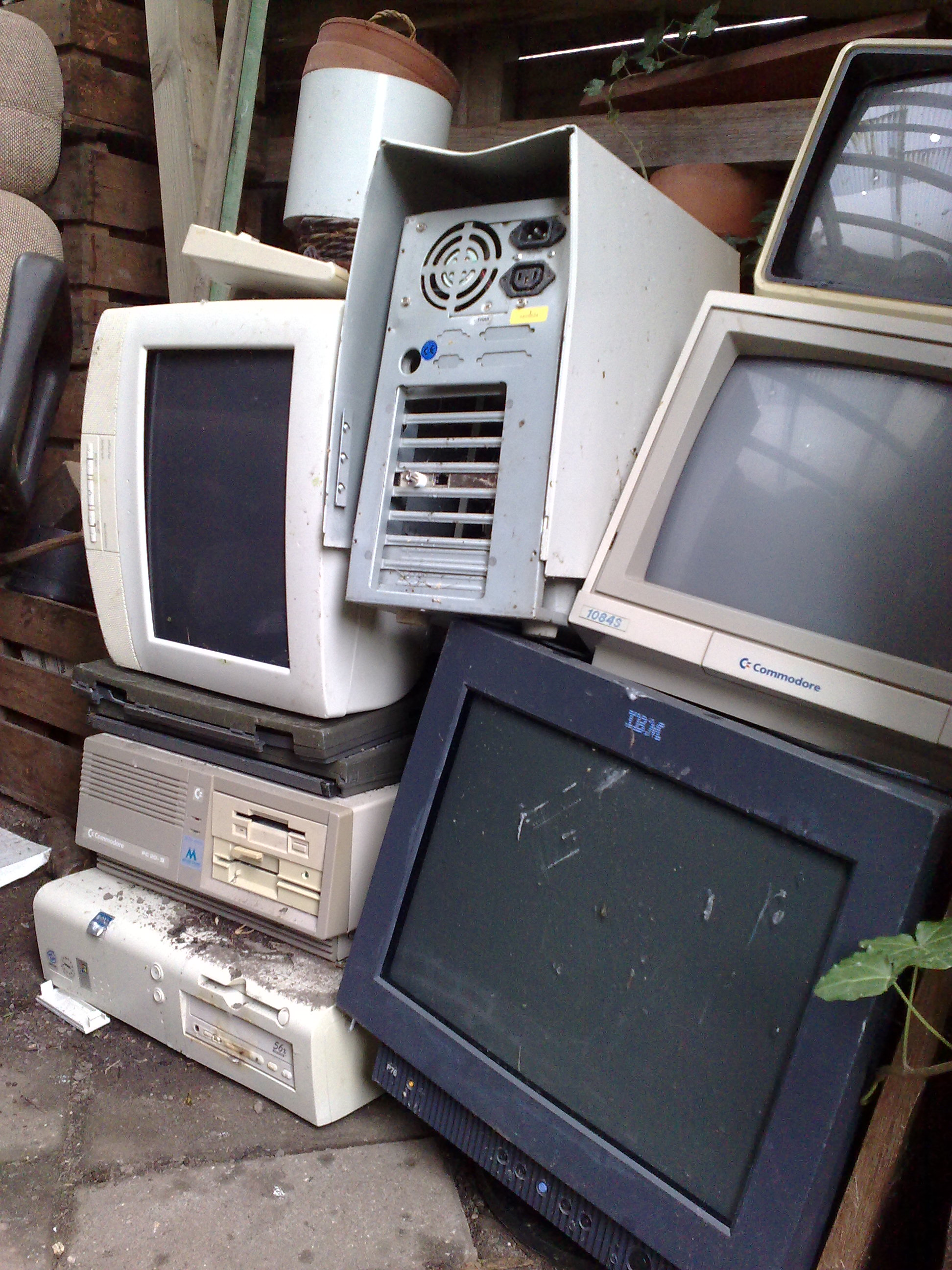
Electronic waste: discarded electronic equipment

A high number of different metals and low concentration rates in electronics means that recycling is limited and energy intensive. Electronic waste describes discarded electrical or electronic devices. Many consumer electronics may contain toxic minerals and elements, and many electronic scrap components, such as CRTs, may contain contaminants such as lead, cadmium, beryllium, mercury, dioxins, or brominated flame retardants. Electronic waste recycling may involve significant risk to workers and communities and great care must be taken to avoid unsafe exposure in recycling operations and leaking of materials such as heavy metals from landfills and incinerator ashes. However, large amounts of the produced electronic waste from developed countries is exported, and handled by the informal sector in countries like India, despite the fact that exporting electronic waste to them is illegal. Strong informal sector can be a problem for the safe and clean recycling.

==== Reuse and repair ====
E-waste policies have evolved since the 1970s, with priorities shifting over time. Initially, the focus was on safer disposal methods due to the toxic materials often found in electronic waste. Over the years, attention turned to the recovery of valuable metals and plastics that could be recycled. More recently, the emphasis has shifted once again, this time toward reusing entire devices. New guidelines promoting 'preparation for reuse' highlight the growing importance of repair and reuse, signaling a gradual change in public and policy attitudes.

With turnover of small household appliances high and costs relatively low, many consumers will throw unwanted electrical goods in the normal dustbin, meaning that items of potentially high reuse or recycling value go to landfills. While more oversized items such as washing machines are usually collected, it has been estimated that the 160,000 tonnes of EEE in regular waste collections were worth £220 million. 23% of EEE (Electrical and electronic equipment) taken to Household Waste Recycling Centres was immediately resalable – or would be with minor repairs or refurbishment. This indicates a lack of awareness among consumers about where and how to dispose of EEE and the potential value of things that are going in the bin.

For the reuse and repair of electrical goods to increase substantially in the UK, some barriers must be overcome. These include people's mistrust of used equipment in terms of whether it will be functional, safe and the stigma for some of owning second-hand goods. But the benefits of reuse could allow lower-income households access to previously unaffordable technology while helping the environment at the same time.

== Health impact ==
Desktop monitors and laptops can contribute to major physical health concerns known as repetitive strain injuries. For example, when users are forced to bend to see electronic screens better, they may experience chronic neck and back pains. The best-known disease in this category is carpal tunnel syndrome. Other conditions include de Quervain syndrome, a condition that affects tendons in the thumb.

Electronic use before bed is also associated with poorer sleep quality and sleep duration. Poor quality, shorter sleep is associated with various health conditions such as obesity and diabetes.

== See also ==
- Digital electronics
- Electronics industry
- Home appliance
- Intellectual property protection in consumer electronics industry
- Timeline of electrical and electronic engineering
