= Desay =

Chinese electronics and investment holding company

Desay Corporation
- Native name: 广东德赛集团有限公司
- Industry: Electronics industry
- Predecessor: Huiyang Prefecture Industrial Development Corporation
- Founded: 1983; 43 years ago
- Headquarters: Desay Building, 12 West Yunshan Road, Jiangbei, Huizhou, Guangdong, China
- Key people: Jiang Jie (chairman and president)
- Products: Automotive electronics, battery-management systems, battery-pack integration, precision components, LED displays and industrial automation
- Parent: Huizhou Deheng Industrial Co., Ltd.
- Website: www.desay.com

Desay Corporation (Full name in Chinese: 广东德赛集团有限公司; pinyin: Guǎngdōng Désài Jítuán Yǒuxiàn Gōngsī) is a Chinese electronics group headquartered in Huizhou, Guangdong. Its business include automotive electronics, battery-management and battery-pack integration, precision components, LED displays and industrial automation. The group traces its origins to a local-government industrial development company established in 1983.

Desay Corporation is a major shareholder in two companies listed on the Shenzhen Stock Exchange: Desay Battery (SZSE: 000049) and Desay SV (SZSE: 002920).

== History ==
The group's predecessor, the Huiyang Prefecture Industrial Development Corporation (惠阳地区工业发展总公司), was established in 1983 by local authorities with five employees and a loan of 50,000 yuan. It was created to develop electronics manufacturing in the area that later became the prefecture-level city of Huizhou. The company began establishing Sino-foreign joint ventures with businesses from Hong Kong and other markets in 1986.

In 1992, the Huizhou municipal government approved the formation of Huizhou Desay Group. During the 1990s, the group manufactured and marketed consumer electronics under the Desay brand, including telephones and VCD players.

The present corporation, Guangdong Desay Group Co., Ltd., was incorporated on 28 April 2002. A restructuring during this period introduced employee shareholding alongside state ownership. In 2004, Desay obtained its first publicly listed platform through the restructuring of the company now known as Desay Battery.

In 2010, Desay acquired the 70 per cent foreign interest in Siemens VDO Auto Electronics (Huizhou), adding it to the 30 per cent interest that Desay already held in the joint venture. The business was subsequently reorganised as Desay SV, forming the basis of the group's automotive-electronics operations. From 2013, the group reduced its involvement in consumer terminal products and increasingly concentrated on automotive electronics and batteries for new-energy applications.

A corporate restructuring conducted in 2020 and 2021 separated Desay Corporation from the state-owned investment company Huizhou Industrial Investment and Development Capital Management Co., Ltd., commonly referred to as Huizhou Capital. Under the resulting structure, Desay Corporation became a wholly owned subsidiary of Huizhou Deheng Industrial Co., Ltd., while Huizhou Capital remained under the control of the Huizhou municipal government.

== Ownership and operations ==
Desay's automotive-electronics interests are primarily represented by its shareholding in Desay SV. The company develops and manufactures products used in vehicle cockpit systems, driver-assistance systems and connected-vehicle electronics. Desay's battery-related interests are represented by Desay Battery, whose activities include lithium-battery power-management systems and battery-pack integration for consumer electronics, power tools, energy-storage equipment and other applications.

The group also has interests in precision components, industrial automation equipment, LED displays, property management and construction-related services. Desay Corporation functions principally as an investment holding company, while manufacturing and research activities are carried out by its investee companies and other operating entities.

Desay Corporation is wholly owned by Huizhou Deheng Industrial Co., Ltd. Jiang Jie has served as chairman and president of Desay Corporation since December 2015.
