= Leff =

Leff is a surname. Notable people with the surname include:

- Ari Leff, musician
- Arthur Allen Leff (1935–1981), American professor of law
- Barbara Leff (born 1947), American politician
- Enrique Leff, a Mexican economist
- Harvey S. Leff (born 1937), United States physicist
- Laurel Leff, author
- Michael Leff (1941–2010), hi U.S. scholar of rhetoric
- Pincus Leff, comedian
- Robert Leff, American businessman
- Zev Leff, Israeli Rabbi

== See also ==
- Lef
- Leffe, a premium beer brand
