= Pars Khazar =

- Company type: Public
- Industry: Home appliances, Electronics
- Founded: November 1982
- Headquarters: Rasht, Iran
- Website: www.parskhazar.com/en

Pars Khazar is an Iranian small appliance manufacturer in Rasht.

== History ==
The company was founded in November 1982. Historically a major producer of portable heaters and air conditioners, the company has expanded.
