= Toshiba Lebanon plant =

- Built: 1978
- Operated: 1978–2007
- Location: 1420 Toshiba Drive; Lebanon, Tennessee, United States
- Coordinates: 36°13′54″N 86°19′45″W
- Industry: Electronics
- Products: televisions
- Employees: 1,100
- Volume: 1,000,000 square feet (93,000 m^{2})
- Owner: Toshiba

Toshiba Lebanon plant was a television manufacturing plant in Lebanon, Tennessee, owned by Toshiba. The facility was closed in 2007.

== History ==
In December 1977, Toshiba selected Lebanon, Tennessee, for its first US manufacturing plant to build color televisions. The plant was opened in 1978 with an initial size of 148,000 square feet (13,700 m^{2}) and 112 workers.

In June 2007, Toshiba announced it would shut down its large-screen, DLP, television manufacturing plant in Lebanon, Tennessee, and will terminate 200 workers at the plant. The factory ceased operating on September 21, 2007.

The plant had since transformed into a multi-tenant industrial and technology park called the Novamet Tech Center.
