= End user =

Regular user of a product

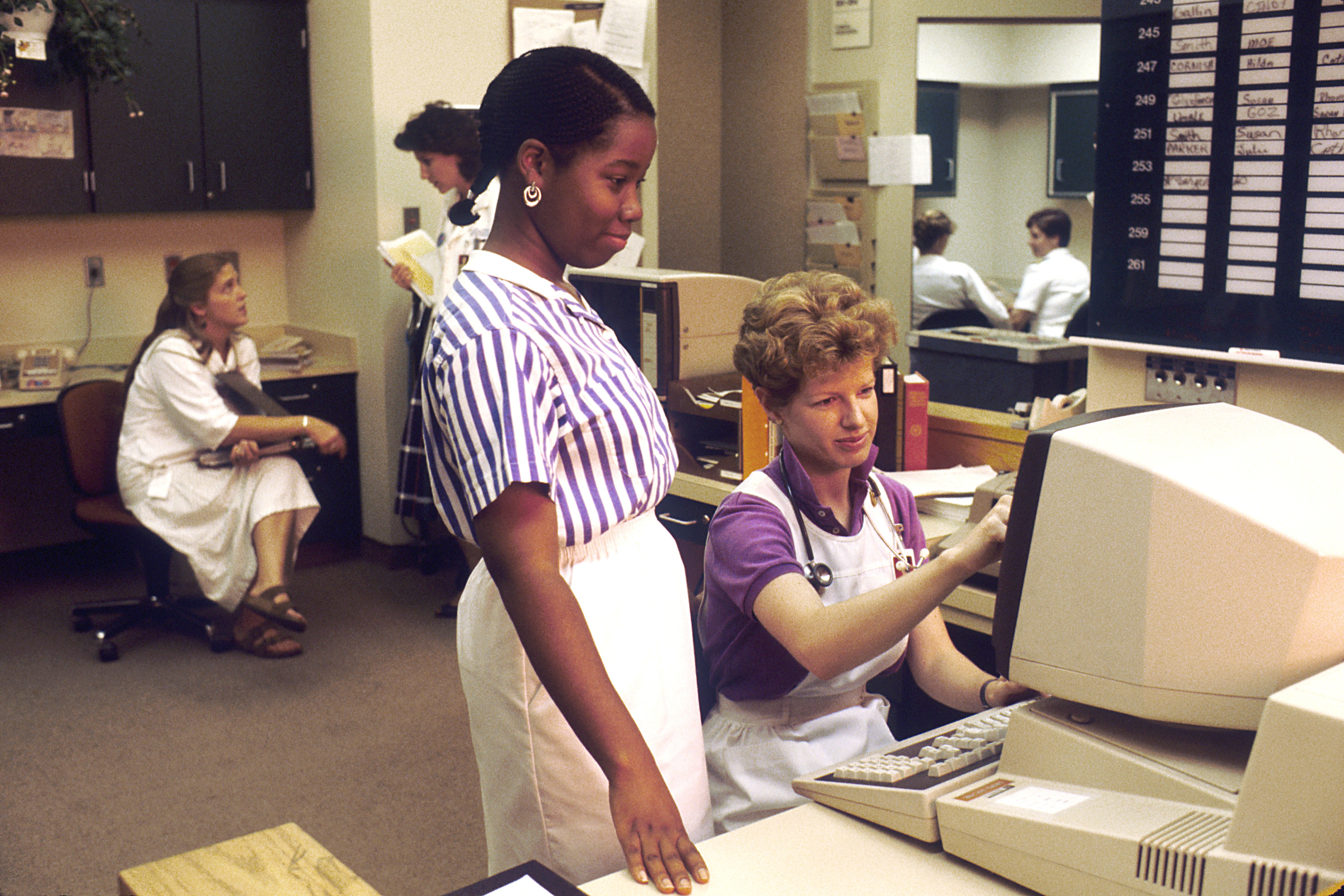
Nurses as information systems end users

In product development, an end user is a person who ultimately uses or is intended to ultimately use a product. The end user stands in contrast to users who support or maintain the product, such as sysops, system administrators, database administrators, information technology (IT) experts, software professionals, and computer technicians. End users typically do not possess the technical understanding or skill of the product designers, a fact that can be easily overlooked by designers, which may lead to features with low customer satisfaction. In information technology, end users are not customers in the usual sense—they are typically employees of the customer. For example, if a large retail corporation buys a software package for its employees to use, even though the large retail corporation was the customer that purchased the software, the end users are the employees of the company, who will use the software at work.

== Context ==
End users are one of the three major factors contributing to the complexity of managing information systems. The end user's position has changed from a position in the 1950s (where end users did not interact with the mainframe; computer experts programmed and ran the mainframe) to one in the 2010s where the end user collaborates with and advises the management information system and Information Technology department about his or her needs regarding the system or product. This raises new questions, such as: Who manages each resource?, What is the role of the MIS Department? and What is the optimal relationship between the end-user and the MIS Department?

== Empowerment ==
The concept of end-user first surfaced in the late 1980s and has since then raised many debates. One challenge was the goal to give both the user more freedom, by adding advanced features and functions (for more advanced users) and adding more constraints (to prevent a neophyte user from accidentally erasing an entire company's database). This phenomenon appeared as a consequence of consumerization of computer products and software. In the 1960s and 1970s, computer users were generally programming experts and computer scientists. However, in the 1980s, and especially in the mid-to-late 1990s and the early 2000s, everyday, regular people began using computer devices and software for personal and work use. IT specialists needed to cope with this trend in various ways. In the 2010s, users now want to have more control over the systems they operate, to solve their own problems, and be able to customize the systems to suit their needs. The apparent drawbacks were the risk of corruption of the systems and data the users had control of, due to their lack of knowledge on how to properly operate the computer/software at an advanced level.

For companies to appeal to the user, it took primary care to accommodate and think of end-users in their new products, software launches, and updates. A partnership needed to be formed between the programmer-developers and the everyday end users so both parties could maximize the use of the products effectively. A major example of the public's effects on end user's requirements were the public libraries. They have been affected by new technologies in many ways, ranging from the digitalization of their card catalog, the shift to e-books, e-journals, and offering online services. Libraries have had to undergo many changes in order to cope, including training existing librarians in Web 2.0 and database skills, to hiring IT and software experts.

== End user documentation ==
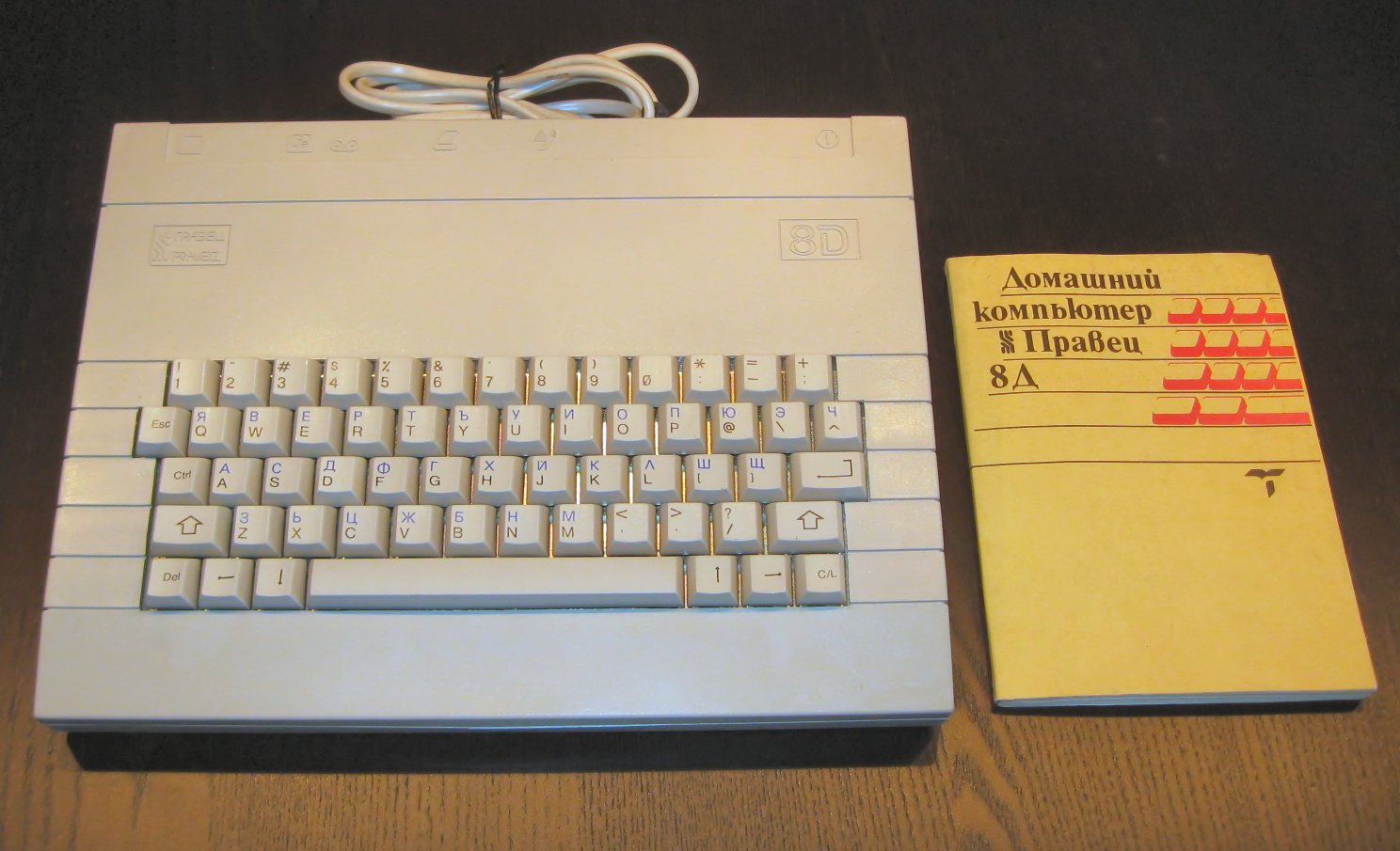
1980s-era personal computer with end-user documentation

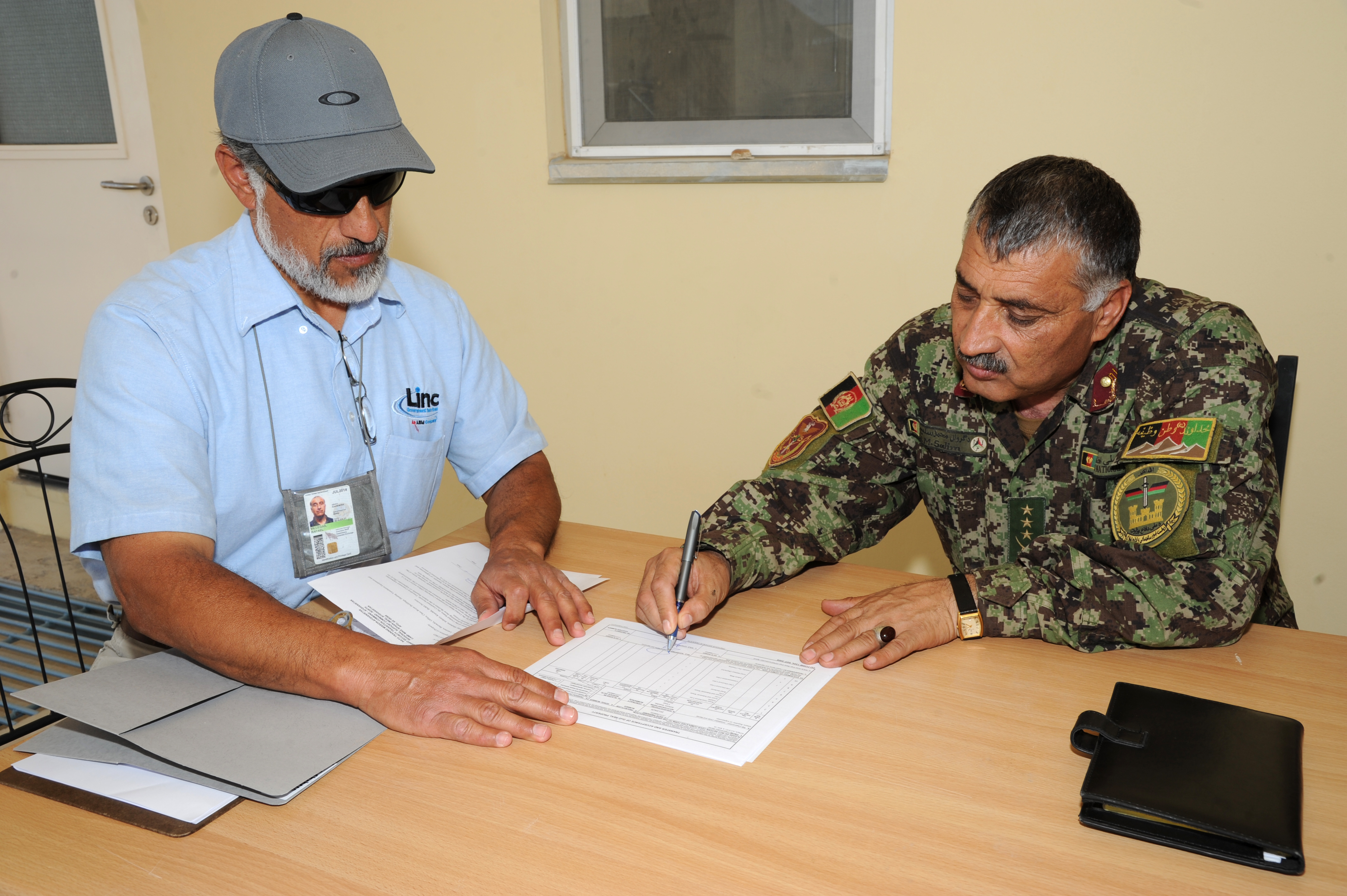
NATO official and Afghan colonel going through end-user documentation to transfer control of barracks to the Afghan army in 2009

The aim of end user documentation (e.g., manuals and guidebooks for products) is to help the user understand certain aspects of the systems and to provide all the answers in one place. A lot of documentation is available for users to help them understand and properly use a certain product or service. Due to the fact that the information available is usually very vast, inconsistent or ambiguous (e.g., a user manual with hundreds of pages, including guidance on using advanced features), many users suffer from an information overload. Therefore, they become unable to take the right course of action. This needs to be kept in mind when developing products and services and the necessary documentation for them.

Well-written documentation is needed for a user to reference. Some key aspects of such a documentation are:

- Specific titles and subtitles for subsections to aid the reader in finding sections
- Use of videos, annotated screenshots, text and links to help the reader understand how to use the device or program
- Structured provision of information, which goes from the most basic instructions, written in plain language, without specialist jargon or acronyms, progressing to the information that intermediate or advanced users will need (these sections can include jargon and acronyms, but each new term should be defined or spelled out upon its first use)
- Easy to search the help guide, find information and access information
- Clear end results are described to the reader (e.g., "When the program is installed properly, an icon will appear in the left-hand corner of your screen and the LED will turn on...")
- Detailed, numbered steps, to enable users with a range of proficiency levels (from novice to advanced) to go step-by-step to install, use and troubleshoot the product or service
- Unique Uniform Resource Locator (URLs) so that the user can go to the product website to find additional help and resources.

At times users do not refer to the documentation available to them due to various reasons, ranging from finding the manual too large or due to not understanding the jargon and acronyms it contains. In other cases, the users may find that the manual makes too many assumptions about a user having pre-existing knowledge of computers and software, and thus the directions may skip over these initial steps (from the users' point of view). Thus, frustrated user may report false problems because of their inability to understand the software or computer hardware. This in turn causes the company to focus on perceived problems instead of focusing on the actual problems of the software.

== Security ==
In the 2010s, there is a lot of emphasis on user's security and privacy. With the increasing role that computers are playing in people's lives, people are carrying laptops and smartphones with them and using them for scheduling appointments, making online purchases using credit cards and searching for information. These activities can potentially be observed by companies, governments or individuals, which can lead to breaches of privacy, identity theft, by, blackmailing and other serious concerns. As well, many businesses, ranging from small business startups to huge corporations are using computers and software to design, manufacture, market and sell their products and services, and businesses also use computers and software in their back office processes (e.g., human resources, payroll, etc.). As such, it is important for people and organizations to know that the information and data they are storing, using, or sending over computer networks, or storing on computer systems, is secure.

However, developers of software and hardware are faced with many challenges in developing a system that can be both user friendly, accessible 24/7 on almost any device, and be truly secure. Security leaks happen, even to individuals and organizations that have security measures in place to protect their data and information (e.g., firewalls, encryption, strong passwords). The complexities of creating such a secure system come from the fact that the behaviour of humans is not always rational or predictable. Even in a very-well secured computer system, a malicious individual can telephone a worker and pretend to be a private investigator working for the software company, and ask for the individual's password, a dishonest process called phishing. As well, even with a well-secured system, if a worker decides to put the company's electronic files on a USB drive to take them home to work on them over the weekend (against many companies' policies), and then loses this USB drive, the company's data may be compromised. Therefore, developers need to make systems that are intuitive to the user in order to have information security and system security.

Another key step to end user security is informing the people and employees about the security threats and what they can do to avoid them or protect themselves and the organization. Clearly underlining the capabilities and risks makes users more aware and informed whilst they are using the products.

Some situations that could put the user at risk are:

- Auto-logon as administrator options
- Auto-fill options, in which a computer or program remembers a user's personal information and HTTP cookies
- Opening junk emails of suspicious emails and/or opening/running attachments or computer files contained in these
- Email being monitored by third parties, especially when using Wi-Fi connections
- Unsecure Wi-Fi or use of a public Wi-Fi network at a coffee shop or hotel
- Weak passwords (using a person's own name, own birthdate, name or birthdate of children, or easy-to-guess passwords such as "1234")
- Malicious programs such as viruses

Even if the security measures in place are strong, the choices the user makes and his/her behavior have a major impact on how secure their information really is. Therefore, an informed user is one who can protect and achieve the best security out of the system they use. Because of the importance of end-user security and the impact it can have on organizations the UK government set out a guidance for the public sector, to help civil servants learn how to be more security aware when using government networks and computers. While this is targeted to a certain sector, this type of educational effort can be informative to any type of user. This helps developers meet security norms and end users be aware of the risks involved. Reimers and Andersson have conducted a number of studies on end-user security habits and found that the same type of repeated education/training in security best practices can have a marked effect on the perception of compliance with good end-user network security habits, especially concerning malware and ransomware.

== Law ==
In end-user license agreements, the end user is distinguished from the value-added reseller who installs the software or the organization that purchases and manages the software.

Certain American defense-related products and information require export approval from the United States Government under the International Traffic in Arms Regulations and Export Administration Regulations. In order to obtain a license to export, the exporter must specify both the end user and the end use for undertaking an end-user certificate.

In the UK, there exist documents that accompany licenses for products named in the end user undertaking statements.

== See also ==
- End-user computing
- End-user development
- Voice of the customer
- User guide
