= Intellectual property protection in consumer electronics industry =

The protection of intellectual property (IP) in the consumer electronics industry involves the protection of inventions, designs, symbols, names and images used in commerce.

Common IP protection strategies include non-disclosure agreements, master service agreements, enforcing vendor security practices with penalty clauses, and training personnel in IP protection and secrecy awareness.
