= LEF =

LEF or Lef may refer to:

== Arts and entertainment ==
- LEF (journal), a 1920s Soviet journal of aesthetics
- L.E.F., a 2006 album by Ferry Corsten
- Lef, Dutch title of Guts, a 1999 Dutch comedy film

== Organizations ==
- LEF – For the New Generation, a political party in the Netherlands
- Leading Edge Forum, a British consulting company
- Legal Education Foundation, a British grant-making foundation
- Life Extension Foundation, now the Biomedical Research & Longevity Society, an American organization

== Science and technology ==
- Library Exchange Format, an integrated circuit design format
- Luquillo Experimental Forest, a UNESCO Biosphere Reserve in Puerto Rico
- Lymphoid enhancer-binding factor 1, a protein in humans

== Other ==
- Lef Nosi (1877–1946), Albanian publisher, archivist, philologist, and ethnographer
