= Leading Edge Forum =

Company

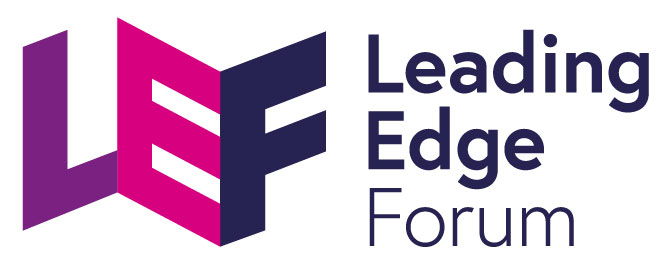
- Company type: Division
- Industry: Research and advisory services
- Founded: 1989; 37 years ago
- Headquarters: London, United Kingdom
- Number of locations: 10
- Area served: Worldwide
- Key people: Richard Davies (Managing Director)
- Parent: DXC Technology
- Website: leadingedgeforum.com

Leading Edge Forum (LEF) is a British company focusing on programme of research, advisory interventions, and events for clients' capabilities. Leading Edge Forum is a business unit of DXC Technology.

== History ==
In 1988, CSC acquired the consulting and research firm Index Group in the United States and later the Butler Cox Foundation in the United Kingdom in 1991.

Index Group, founded by Thomas P. Gerrity and others from MIT, coined the term business re-engineering by James Champy and Michael Hammer's book, Re-engineering the Corporation, in collaboration with Michael Treacy.

The Butler Cox Foundation was founded by David Butler and George Cox for senior IT executives to share experiences.

The term consumerization was explored by LEF in a position paper in June 2004.

== Leadership ==
As of 2014, the Managing Director is Richard Davies.

== Press coverage ==
Leading Edge Forum has been mentioned by Forbes, The Economist, CIO, and The Wall Street Journal.
