= Cellport Systems =

Cellport Systems, Inc.
- Type: Private Corporation
- Industry: Wireless communication; Vehicular communication systems; Blockchain vehicle systems; Crypotocurrency
- Founded: Boulder, Colorado, United States (1992)
- Founders: Pat Kennedy, Dale Hatfield, Hiroshi Sakurai, Michael F. Braitberg, Les Hatcher, Dick Chandler, Don Hume
- Headquarters: Boulder Colorado, United States
- Number of locations: 2 (2018)
- Area served: Worldwide
- Key people: Pat Kennedy (Chairman and CEO), Andy Quartner (Vice Chairman), Chuck Spaur (Architect), Ralph Poplawsky (Product Development), Steve Parrish (CFO).
- Products: Mobile device cradles; Internet vehicle gateways; Blockchain enabled gateways
- Website: Cellport Systems

Cellport Systems, Inc., is an American company specializing in the invention, prototype development, patenting, and licensing of wireless connectivity technologies for Internet-connected vehicles and mobile devices. Cellport also develops vehicle gateways using secure blockchain technology. Cellport licenses its technologies to vehicle and wireless device manufacturers worldwide.

== History ==
Cellport Systems was founded in 1992 as Cellport Labs by a diverse group of entrepreneurs and inventors. In 2000 the company’s name changed to Cellport Systems. From its inception Cellport has designed innovative connectivity systems for mass adoption. The first product Cellport designed and prototyped was the CellBase™ mobile docking station under contract by licensee Hello Direct in 1993. In 1994 a consortium of six cellular carriers (GTE, AT&T Wireless, PacTel (Pacific Telesis), Bell Atlantic, Ameritech, and Bell Canada) funded a Cellport research project focused on interfacing digital wireless data services to vehicle networks.

Further equity infusion from AT&T Wireless in 1995 allowed Cellport to hire design architect Chuck Spaur from the NCAR who, in 1996, led the design of the MobileWeb™ 9700 platform, a system using wireless data technology to connect vehicle internal systems as a node on the Internet. The first public showing of the Internet-connected vehicle was made with a real-time demonstration using CDPD on March 25, 1996, at Cellport’s booth at the CTIA conference in Dallas, Texas.

On April 29, 1997, Mercedes-Benz, as noted by The New York Times, made a public demonstration of their WebCar™ which included Cellport’s MobileWeb platform. Other vehicle manufactures using the MobileWeb 9700 and 9720 to investigate vehicle wireless connectivity included Caterpillar, Chrysler, John Deere, Motorola, Cisco Systems, and Omron. During 2000, Cellport engineers developed a second-generation universal mobile docking station, the CP-3000™, addressing the trend of lawmakers seeking to prohibit hand-held wireless phones in cars. The hands-free kit consisted of a docking station, microphone, speaker, antenna, and adapter, and could be used with nearly any mobile phone. Cellport showcased its product in five General Motors vehicles on display at the 2001 SEMA Show in Las Vegas. Initial customers and licensees for this product were Motorola, Omron, Peiker Acustic, and Harman International. Other automotive manufactures using the CP-3000 technologies and patents included Volkswagen, Mercedes-Benz, BMW, and Audi. In 2001, Kyoto-based Omron formed a partnership with Cellport to market an automobile anti-theft system and develop a technology to convert text messages into voice messages.

At the Geneva Motor Show in 2005, Cellport announced a new security architecture which was, at that time, known as Secure Telematics Framework. In September 2015, the company rebranded as VeeZee. The architecture was designed to protect vehicles against cyber-attacks and enhance user privacy. Incorporating PKI (public key infrastructure) and federated security models, the system is said to offer improved transaction security for commerce as well as during access to vehicle resources.

By mid-2010, some 2 million Internet-connected cars arrived in auto showrooms. Annual licenses and royalties from Cellport's patent portfolio generated more than $10 million a year in revenue.

In 2012 Cellport initiated the development of the context aware vehicle architecture (CAVA) project leading to the third-generation Cellport III™ universal mobile docking station. The Cellport III platform is designed to improve secure use of mobile services and applications. Cellport III it is intended to connect smartphones, tablets, and public-safety radios to vehicle resources. Initial markets for this platform are commercial fleets and public-safety vehicles. Cellport projects that the new platform will be available for licensing in 2015.

During 2016 CyberCar was created as a subsidiary of Cellport. CyberCar has designed a blockchain platform, Secure Telematics Platform (STP), for any vehicle gateway, delivering a membrane of trust.

== Licensing ==
Although Cellport has been successful in licensing its patents and know-how, the company was unable to capitalize on product development and manufacturing. As a result, Cellport eliminated manufacturing operations and concentrated on prototype development, licensing its patent portfolios, and developing additional technology platforms. Licensees for technology-transfer and patent rights include Motorola Solutions, Apple, BMW, Harman International, Samsung, Nokia, LG, Continental AG, Peiker Acustic, Cullmann, HTC, Omron and Toyota Motor Sales.

== Mobile and vehicle connectivity patents ==
In May 2014, Cellport announced it received an additional U.S. patent; 8,719,592 B2, Secure Telematics, which complements the company’s Secure Telematics Framework portfolio and its security-product platforms.

The following patents cover mobile and vehicle connectivity technologies:

US Patents

Search the US Patent Office Database

1. US 5,333,177—Universal Connection for Cellular Telephone Interface (Universal Mobile Phone Port)
2. US 5,535,274— Universal Connection for Cellular Telephone Interface (Phone Adaptor Holder with Charging)
3. US 5,822,427—Battery Charging for a Plurality of Different Cellular Telephone (Adaptor Latching System)
4. US 6,341,218—Supporting and Connecting a Portable Phone (Dual-Processor Multi-Bus)
5. US 6,377,825—Hands-Free Wireless Communication in a Vehicle (Dual-Processor Multi-Bus)
6. US 5,479,479—Method and Apparatus for Transmission of and Receiving Signals Having Digital Information Using an Air Link (Vehicle Server)
7. US 5,732,074—Mobile Portable Wireless Communication System (Vehicle Server)
8. US 6,122,514—Communications Channel Selection (Link Select Router)
9. US 6,430,164—Communications Involving Disparate Protocol Network/Bus Device Subsystems (Mobile Application Platform)
10. US 6,516,192—Communications Channel Selection (Link Select Router)
11. US 7,346,370—Enabling Interoperability Between Distributed Devices Using Different Communication Link Technologies (CP Connect) US Publication No. 2005/0245272A1 is a related publication
12. US 7,366,892—Secure Telematics (VeeZee)
13. US 8,719,592—Secure Telematics (VeeZee)
14. US 8,027,293—Communication Channel Selection and Use (Link Select) US Publication No. 2009/0022095 is a related publication
15. US 9,130,930 B2—Secure Telematics (VeeZee)

European Patents

Search the European Patent Office Database

1. EP 1 266 456B1—Hands-Free Wireless Communications in a Vehicle (Grant) (Dual-Processor Multi-Bus)
2. EP 1 266 456 A1 and A4 are related applications
3. DE 60127825 D1 and T2—Wireless Hands-Free Communication in a Vehicle (Grant) (Dual-Processor Multi-Bus)
4. DE 69432927 D1 and T2—Method and Device for Wireless Transmission of Data (Grant) (Vehicle Server)
5. EP 0 875 111B1—Mobile Portable Wireless Communication System (Grant) (Vehicle Server)
6. EP 0 875 111 A1 and A4 are related applications
7. EP 1 515 496B1— Mobile Portable Wireless Communication System (Grant) (Vehicle Server)
8. EP 1 515 496 A1 and A4 are related applications
9. DE 69732900 D1 and T2—Mobile, Portable, Wireless Communication System (Grant) (Vehicle Server)
10. DE 69737486 D1 and T2—Mobile, Portable, Wireless Communication System (Grant) (Vehicle Server)
11. EP 1 590 9171B1—A System and a Method for Controlling Use by Applications of Proprietary Resources Within a Secure Telematics System in a Vehicle (Grant) (Secure Telematics Framework)
12. EP 1 590 917 A2 and A4 are related applications
13. EP 1 774 755B Method and Apparatus for Enabling Discovery and Use of a Service by a Client Device (Grant) (CP Connect)
14. EP 1 744 755 A1 and A4 are related applications
15. DE 602005024277D1 Method and Apparatus for Enabling Client Device (Grant) (CP Connect)
16. DE 602004030534D1 System and Method for Controlling Access of Applications to Protected Resources Within a Secure Telematics System Vehicle (Secure Telematics Framework)

== Litigation ==
Cellport filed a contract-violation suit against Peiker Acustic in 2009, claiming the German electronics producer breached a 2004 licensing contract, and sought royalties for seven Peiker products using Cellport hands-free communication systems for motor vehicles. Cellport was awarded $613,433 in damages in the first instance and prevailed in a federal appeals court hearing. On February 4, 2016, the company received a final judgement in Cellport's favor. On April 19, 2016, the U.S. District Court ruled that, in the 2009 litigation v. Peiker Acustic, Cellport is entitled to legal fees.

In January 2013, Cellport filed suit in federal district court against seven smartphone makers—HTC, ZTE, Samsung, LG, Kyocera, Pantech, and Nokia. Cellport settled out of court with each company to collect royalties for its technology-licensing deals.

In June 2014, Cellport filed suit against BMW of North America and Toyota Motor Sales, USA, claiming the auto makers intentionally violated two vehicle-connectivity patents that enable cars to communicate safety and functionality data back to the manufacturers and others. The case is still pending in federal court against BMW.

In 2014, Toyota Motor Sales filed two sets of patent validity challenges against two of Cellport's patents. Toyota was unsuccessful in these two invalidity attempts. On April 11, 2016, the Toyota matter was resolved.

In July 2016, BMW licensed the MNT portfolio thereby resolving patent litigation.
