= Electronics industry =

Industry that focuses in the electronics production

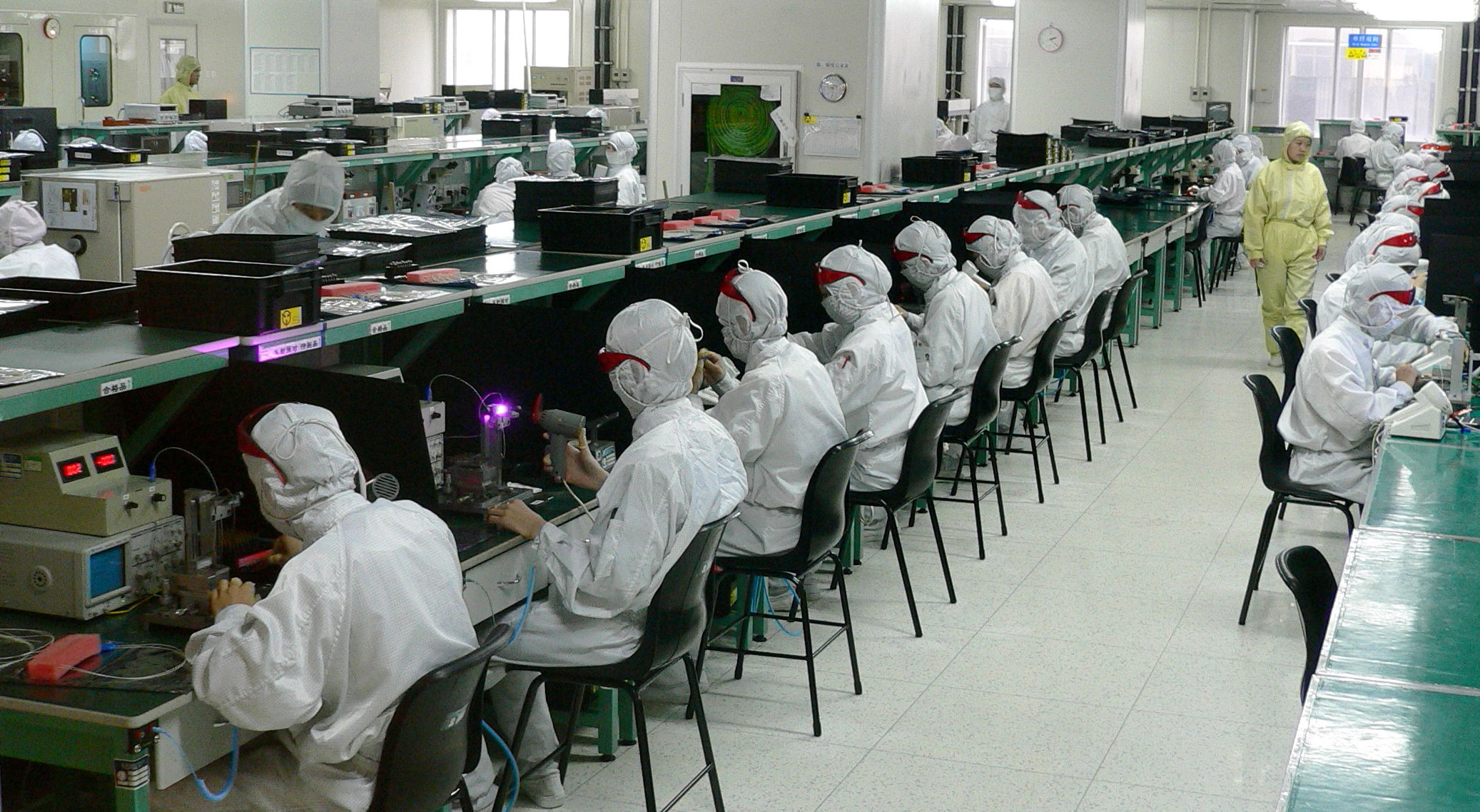
Workers in an electronics factory in Shenzhen, China

The electronics industry is the industry that produces electronic devices. It emerged in the 20th century and is today one of the largest global industries. Contemporary society uses a vast array of electronic devices, including the consumer electronics and home appliances most people are familiar with. The electronics industry builds electronics in factories automated in turn by many different kinds of electronic devices.

Electronic products today are primarily assembled from metal–oxide–semiconductor (MOS) transistors and integrated circuits, the latter principally by photolithography and often on printed circuit boards.

Circuit boards are assembled largely using surface-mount technology, which typically involves the automated placement of electronic parts on circuit boards using pick-and-place machines. Surface-mount technology and pick-and-place robots make it possible to assemble large numbers of circuit boards at high speed.

The industry's size, the use of toxic materials, and the difficulty of recycling have led to a series of problems with electronic waste. International regulation and environmental legislation have been developed to address the issues.

The electronics industry consists of various branches. The central driving force behind the entire electronics industry is the semiconductor industry, which has annual sales of over $481 billion as of 2018.

== History ==
The electric power industry began in the 19th century, which led to the development of inventions such as gramaphones, radio transmitters and receivers, and television. The vacuum tube was used for early electronic devices, before later being largely supplanted by semiconductor components as the fundamental technology of the industry.

The first working transistor, a point-contact transistor, was invented by John Bardeen and Walter Houser Brattain at Bell Laboratories in 1947, which led to significant research in the field of solid-state semiconductors during the 1950s. This led to the emergence of the home entertainment consumer electronics industry starting in the 1950s, largely due to the efforts of Tokyo Tsushin Kogyo (now Sony) in successfully commercializing transistor technology for a mass market, with affordable transistor radios and then transistorized television sets.

The industry employs large numbers of electronics engineers and electronics technicians to design, develop, test, manufacture, install, and repair electrical and electronic equipment such as communication equipment, medical monitoring devices, navigational equipment, and computers. Common parts manufactured are connectors, system components, cell systems, and computer accessories, and these are made of alloy steel, copper, brass, stainless steel, plastic, steel tubing, and other materials.

== Consumer electronics ==
Consumer electronics (or consumer-grade) are products intended for everyday use, most often in entertainment, communications and office productivity. Radio broadcasting in the early 20th century brought the first major consumer product, the broadcast receiver. Later products include personal computers, telephones, MP3 players, cell phones, smart phones, audio equipment, televisions, calculators, GPS automotive electronics, digital cameras and players and recorders using video media such as DVDs, VCRs or camcorders. Increasingly these products have become based on digital technologies, and have largely merged with the computer industry in what is increasingly referred to as the consumerization of information technology.

The CEA (Consumer Electronics Association) projected the value of annual consumer electronics sales in the United States to be over $170 billion in 2008. Global annual consumer electronic sales are expected to reach $2.9 trillion by 2020.

== Professional electronics ==
Professional electronics (also known as industry electronics, professional-grade or professional-oriented) are devices focused on the users with high exigency of technology and hardware equipment. In such cases, technology may be more advanced than currently available for consumer electronics on the market. Professional electronics are more durable than consumer devices because of the focus on high functionality and less on design or visual aspect.

These equipment have less promotional marketing/visibility and focus on technical consumers such as companies. Furthermore, its technical specification is higher specification than consumer specifications.

== Effects on the environment ==
Electrical waste contains hazardous, valuable, and scarce materials, and up to 60 elements can be found in complex electronics.

The United States and China are the world leaders in producing electronic waste, each tossing away about 3 million tons each year. China also remains a major e-waste dumping ground for developed countries. The UNEP estimate that the amount of e-waste being produced – including mobile phones and computers – could rise by as much as 500 percent over the next decade in some developing countries, such as India.

Increasing environmental awareness has led to changes in electronics design to reduce or eliminate toxic materials and reduce energy consumption. The Restriction of Hazardous Substances Directive (RoHS) and Waste Electrical and Electronic Equipment Directive (WEEE) were released by the European Commission in 2002.

== Largest electronics industry sectors ==
Industry sector	Annual revenue	Year	Ref
Tech industry (high tech)	$4,800,000,000,000	2018	
Mobile technology	$3,900,000,000,000	2018	
Consumer electronics	$1,712,900,000,000	2016	
Semiconductor industry	$481,000,000,000	2018	
Television broadcasting services	$407,700,000,000	2017	
Power electronics	$216,000,000,000	2011	
TFT liquid-crystal displays (TFT LCD)	$141,000,000,000	2017	
Video games	$137,900,000,000	2018	
Home video film industry	$55,700,000,000	2018	

== See also ==
- Electronic engineering
- Electronics
- Microelectronics
- MOSFET
- Nanoelectronics
- Power electronics
- Semiconductor
- Silicon
- Technology
- Patton Electronics
- Power user
- Prosumer
