= Consumer electronics store =

Store that sells consumer electronics

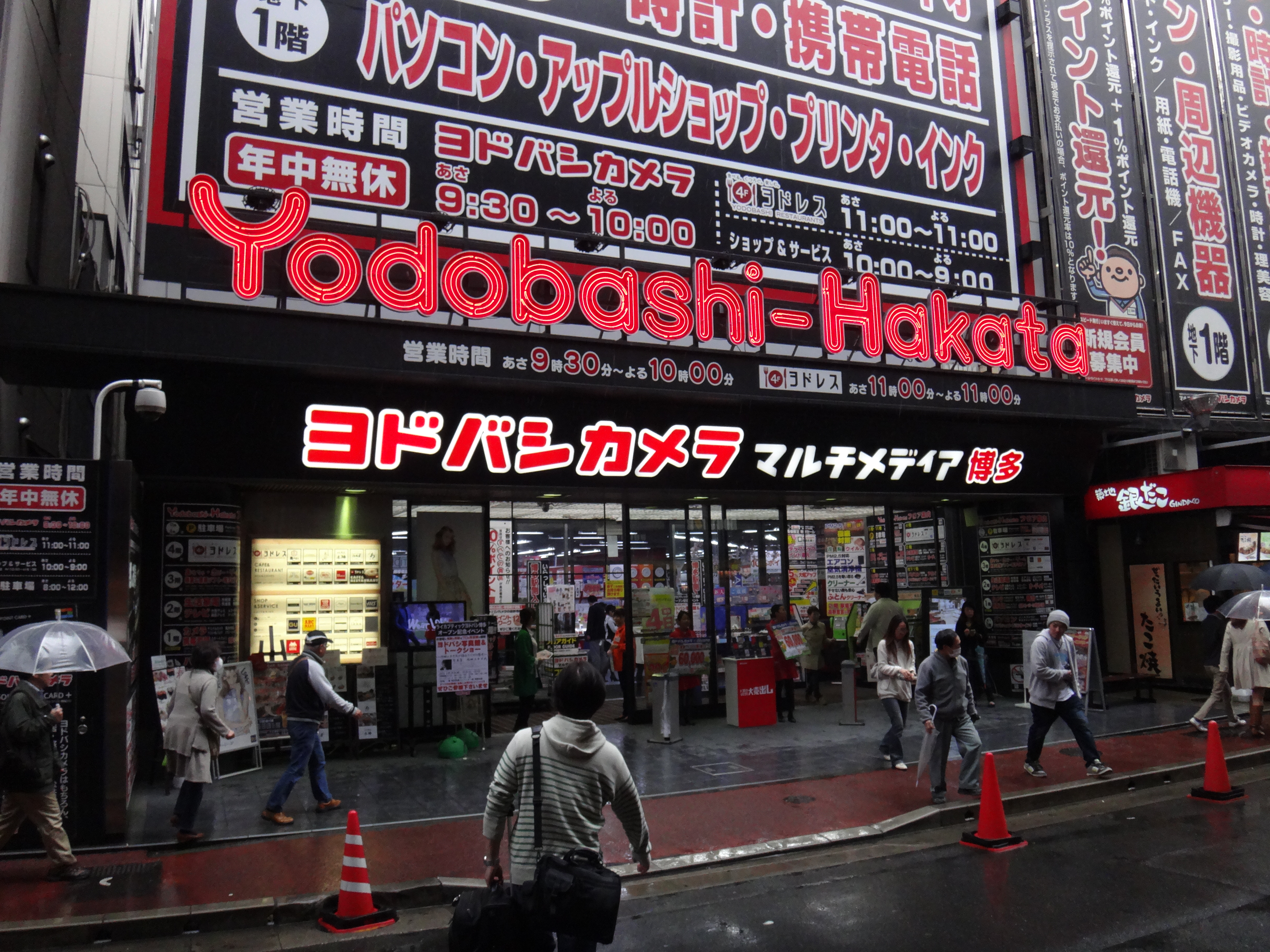
Yodobashi Camera electronics store in Japan.

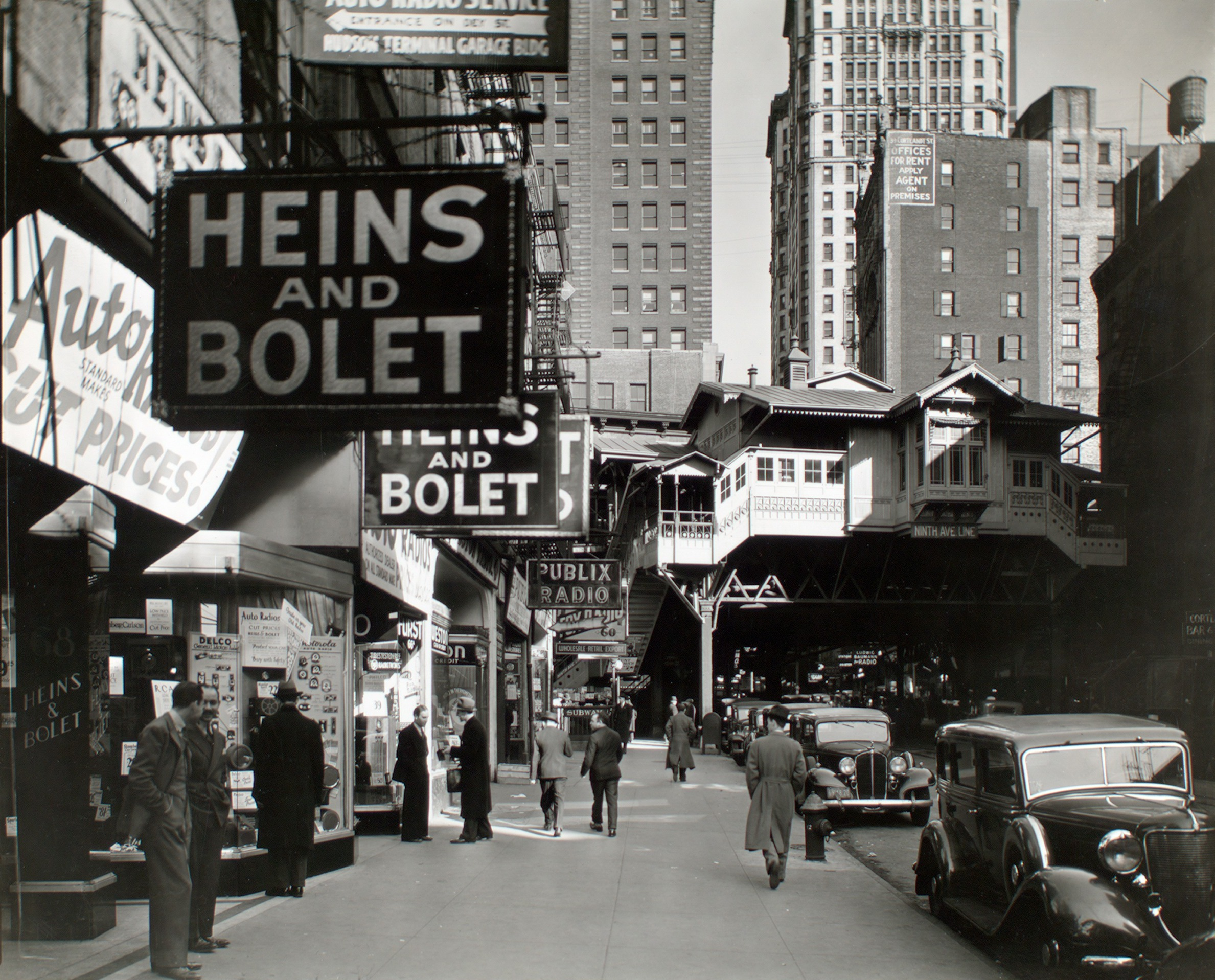
New York's Radio Row in 1936, with the Cortlandt Street station in the background, as seen in a photograph by Berenice Abbott

A consumer electronics store, in the United States and some other countries, is a physical retail store that sells consumer electronics. As technology has progressed, the United States has known variations such as phonograph dealers, radio stores, hi-fi stores, stereo stores, and audio video stores.

== History ==
The origins of the consumer electronics store can be traced back to phonograph dealers in 1893, including specialized phonograph stores, as well as music stores which carried a wider array of music-related merchandise.

With the advent of radio, with radio receiving equipment being sold by specialist electric hardware shops, there was controversy as to whether radio equipment manufacturers should sell wholesale to phonograph and music stores, and to department stores, but in 1923 Federal Telephone & Telegraph Co. started doing so and other manufacturers started suit. Wireless Age estimated that there were 15,000 phonograph dealers in the U.S. in that year.

In the mid-1950s, hi-fi stereo equipment hit the mainstream market and references began to "hi-fi stores". As demand grew for sets of audio components such as tuners, phonographs, receivers and speakers, many regional specialty audio/video chains were established and grew through the 1980s. Boston's Tweeter grew and eventually purchased chains in other regions, such as Bryn Mawr Stereo (Philadelphia), Hi-Fi Buys (Atlanta) Showcase Home Entertainment and Dow (San Diego). These chains added value versus other retailers of audio video equipment such as department stores, discount stores and appliance stores, by providing highly trained salespeople, a wide, often high-end selection of merchandise, and facilities where customers could experience the sound and video of the components

By the 1980s and 1990s, the U.S. was covered by pan-regional and national chains of big box retailers, such as the defunct Circuit City and The Good Guys and the extant Best Buy, where audio and video was a major line of merchandise, next to home appliances, cellphones and computers, putting pressure on independent dealers.

By the 2010s, smartphones and flat-screen televisions provided consumers with audio and video capabilities. Consequently, the mass consumer market in the U.S. for larger audio and video components, excluding televisions and smaller items, decreased. Best Buy and a few regional chains continue to operate, while the remaining independent dealers serve a niche market focused on audio and video reproduction.

== Gallery ==
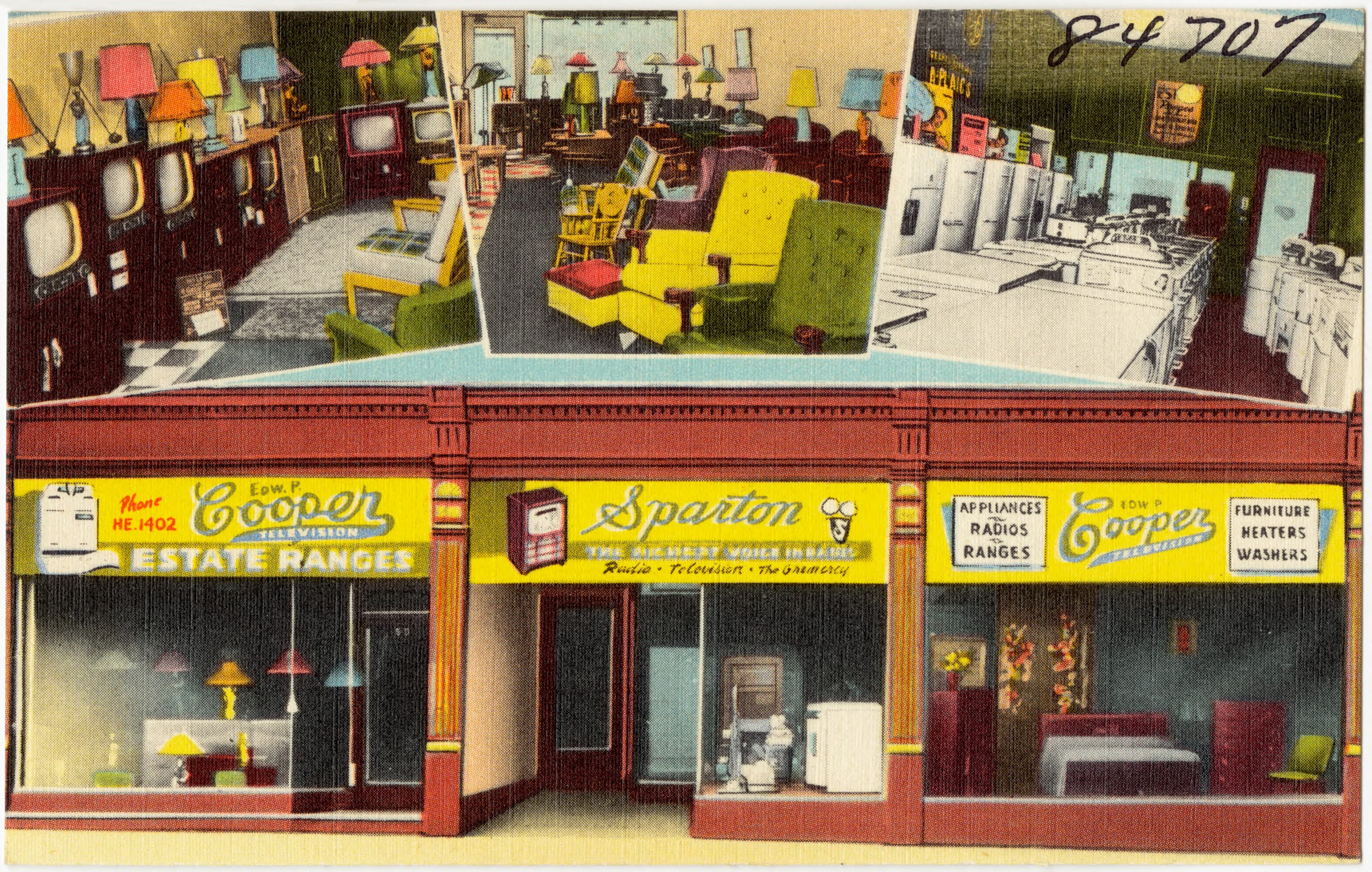
In the 1950s, as today, consumer electronics were sold in stores that also sold appliances, but also in earlier days, furniture

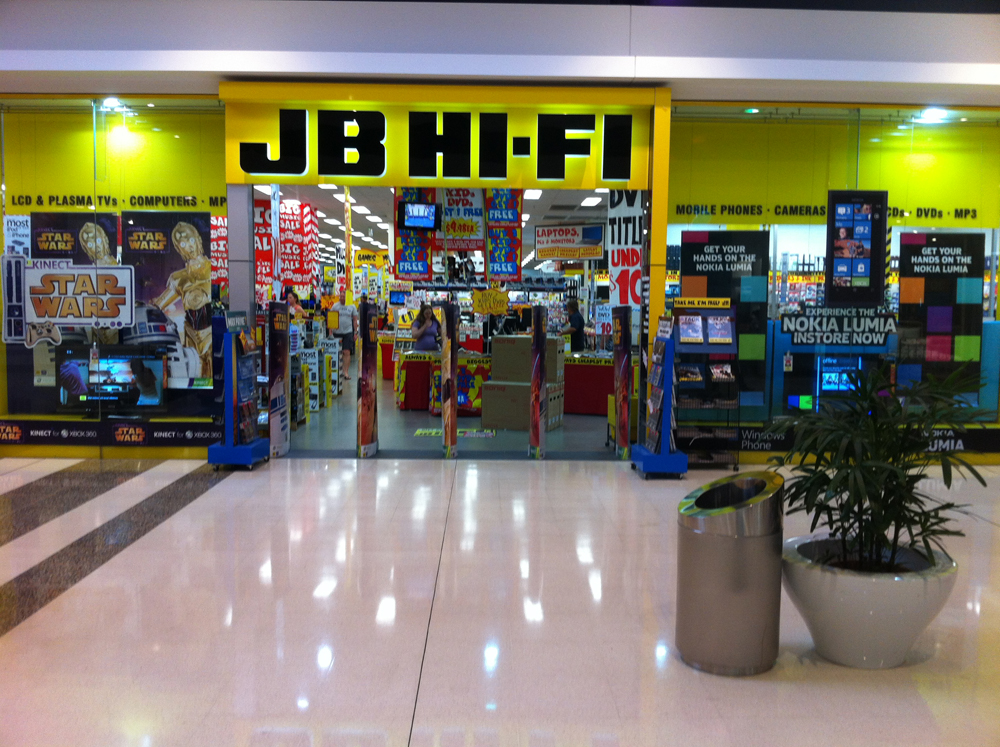
A JB Hi-Fi store in Australia

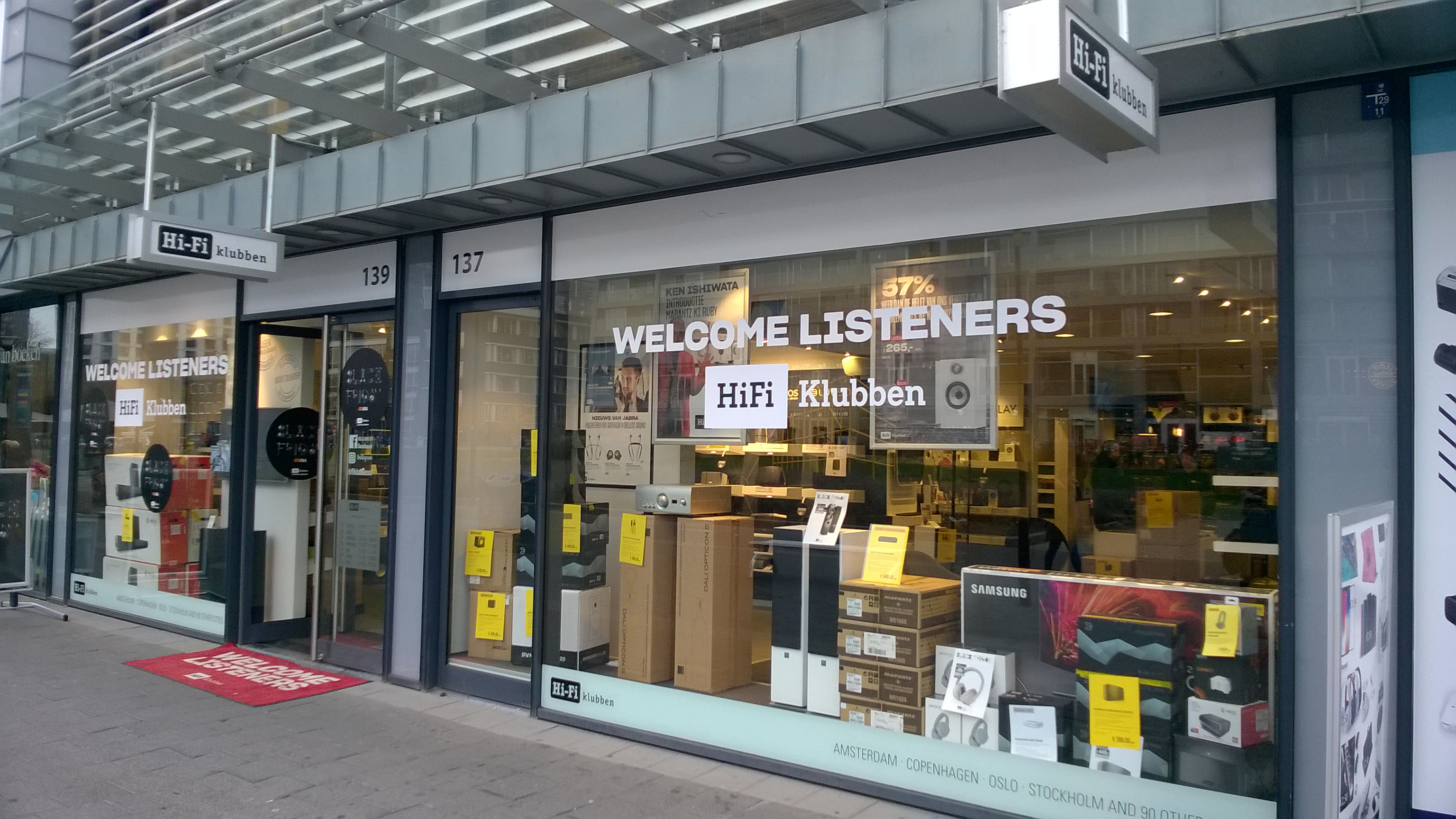
A store for audiophiles in Rotterdam, The Netherlands, 2018

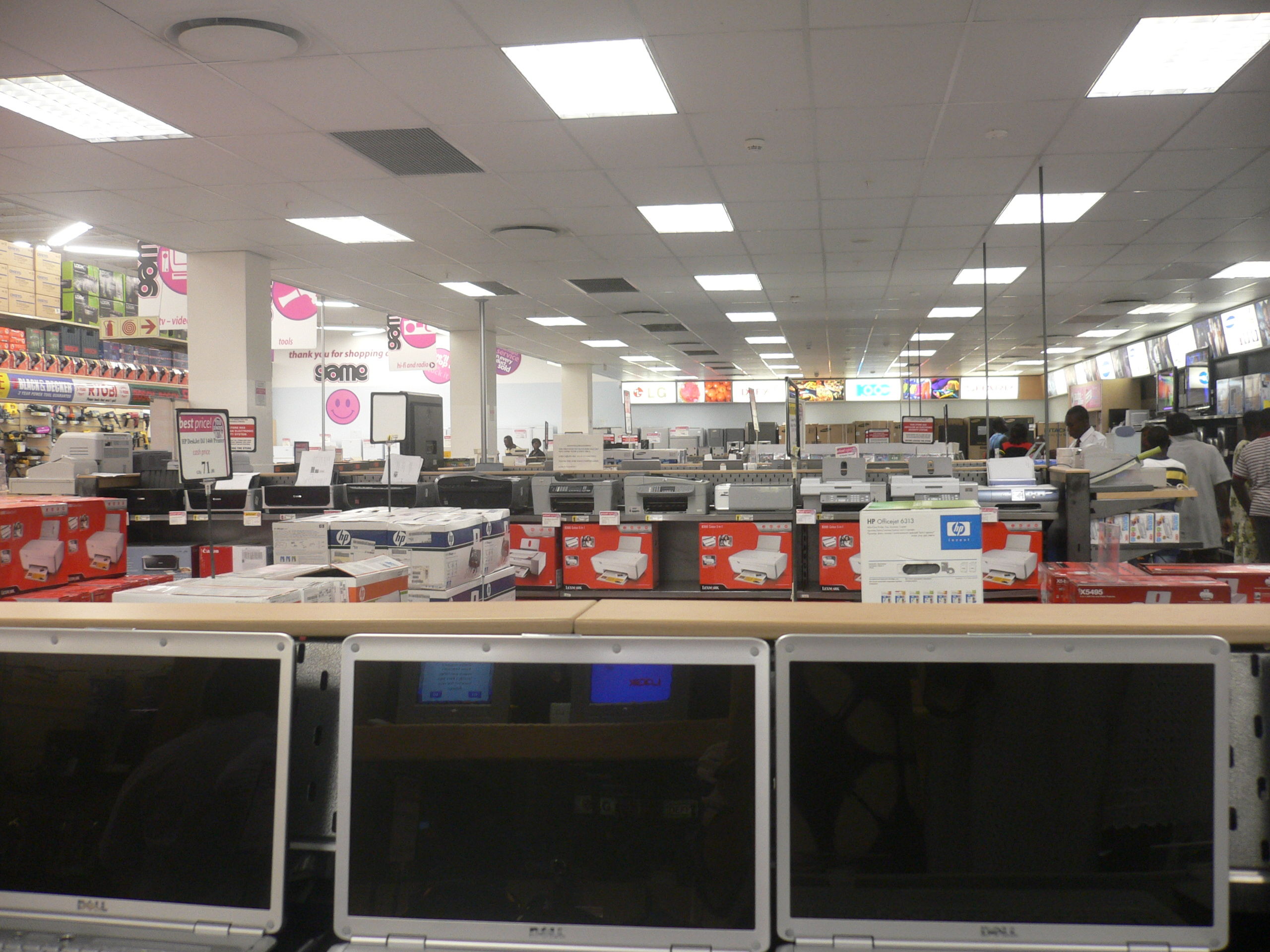
Consumer electronics store in Ghana

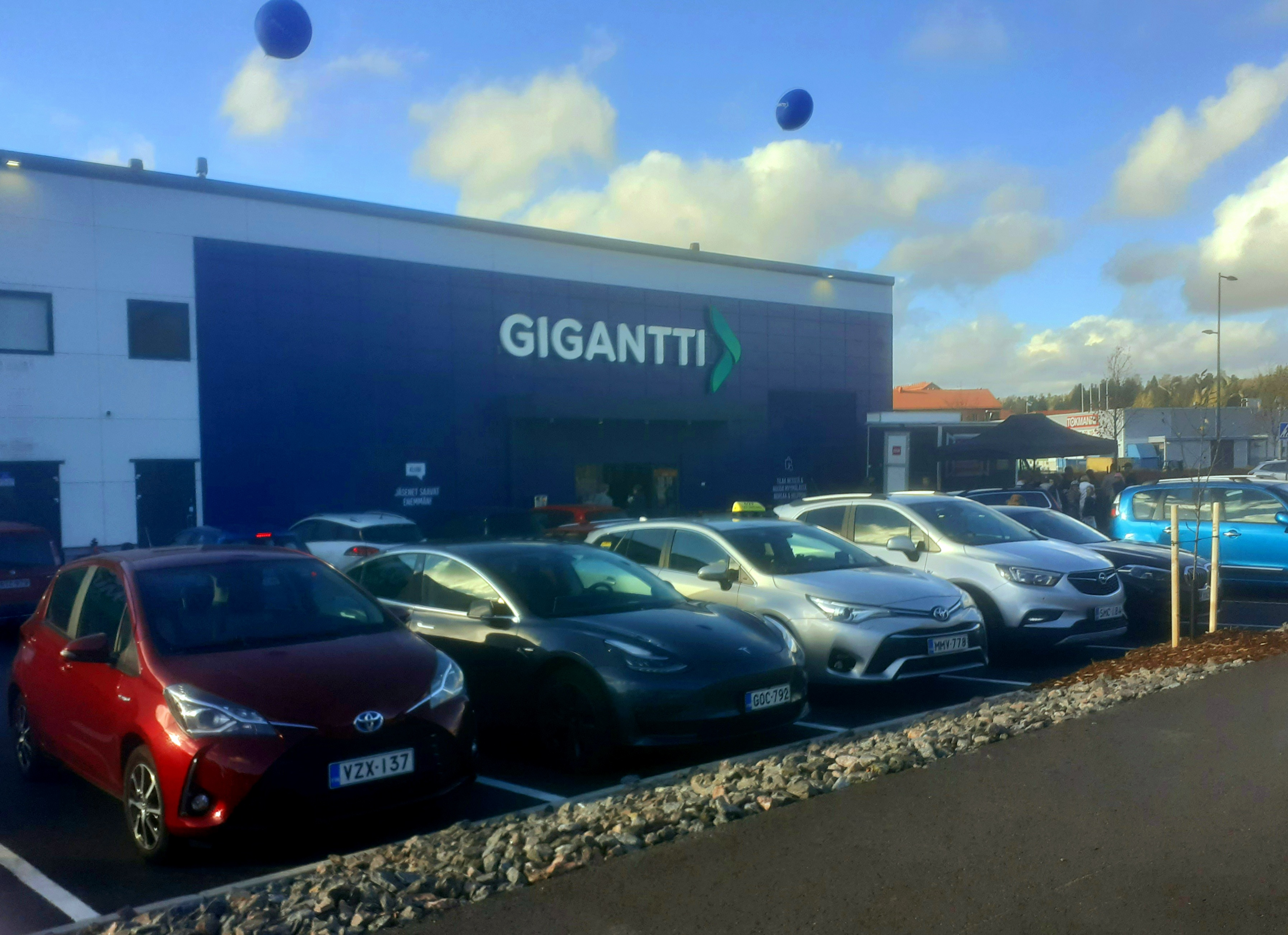
Gigantti store in Klaukkala, Finland
