= Automotive electronics =

Control, communication, and entertainment systems in cars and other motor vehicles

Automotive electronics are electronic systems used in vehicles, including engine management, ignition, radio, carputers, telematics, in-car entertainment systems, and others. Ignition, engine and transmission electronics are also found in trucks, motorcycles, off-road vehicles, and other internal combustion powered machinery such as forklifts, tractors and excavators. Related elements for control of relevant electrical systems are also found on hybrid vehicles and electric cars.

Electronic systems have become an increasingly large component of the cost of an automobile, from only around 1% of its value in 1950 to around 30% in 2010. Modern electric cars rely on power electronics for the main propulsion motor control, as well as managing the battery system. Future autonomous cars will rely on powerful computer systems, an array of sensors, networking, and satellite navigation, all of which will require electronics.

== History ==
The earliest electronic systems available as factory installations were vacuum tube car radios, starting in the early 1930s. The development of semiconductors after World War II greatly expanded the use of electronics in automobiles, with solid-state diodes making the automotive alternator the standard after about 1960, and the first transistorized ignition systems appearing in 1963.

The emergence of metal–oxide–semiconductor (MOS) technology led to the development of modern automotive electronics. The MOSFET was invented at Bell Labs between 1955 and 1960, after Frosch and Derick discovered surface passivation by silicon dioxide and used their finding to create the first planar transistors, the first field effect transistors in which drain and source were adjacent at the same surface, later a team demonstrated a working MOS at Bell Labs. Dawon Kahng summarized in a Bell Labs memo the achievement: E. E. LaBate and E. I. Povilonis who fabricated the device; M. O. Thurston, L. A. D’Asaro, and J. R. Ligenza who developed the diffusion processes, and H. K. Gummel and R. Lindner who characterized the device. This led to the development of the power MOSFET by Hitachi in 1969, and the single-chip microprocessor by Federico Faggin, Marcian Hoff, Masatoshi Shima and Stanley Mazor at Intel in 1971.

The development of MOS integrated circuit (MOS IC) chips and microprocessors made a range of automotive applications economically feasible in the 1970s. In 1971, Fairchild Semiconductor and RCA Laboratories proposed the use of MOS large-scale integration (LSI) chips for a wide range of automotive electronic applications, including a transmission control unit (TCU), adaptive cruise control (ACC), alternators, automatic headlight dimmers, electric fuel pumps, electronic fuel-injection, electronic ignition control, electronic tachometers, sequential turn signals, speed indicators, tire-pressure monitors, voltage regulators, windshield wiper control, Electronic Skid Prevention (ESP), and heating, ventilation, and air conditioning (HVAC).

In the early 1970s, the Japanese electronics industry began producing integrated circuits and microcontrollers for the Japanese automobile industry, used for in-car entertainment, automatic wipers, electronic locks, dashboard, and engine control. The Ford EEC (Electronic Engine Control) system, which utilized the Toshiba TLCS-12 PMOS microprocessor, went into mass production in 1975. In 1978, the Cadillac Seville featured a "trip computer" based on a 6802 microprocessor. Electronically-controlled ignition and fuel injection systems allowed automotive designers to achieve vehicles meeting requirements for fuel economy and lower emissions, while still maintaining high levels of performance and convenience for drivers. Today's automobiles contain a dozen or more processors, in functions such as engine management, transmission control, climate control, antilock braking, passive safety systems, navigation, and other functions.

The power MOSFET and the microcontroller, a type of single-chip microcomputer, led to significant advances in electric vehicle technology. MOSFET power converters allowed operation at much higher switching frequencies, made it easier to drive, reduced power losses, and significantly reduced prices, while single-chip microcontrollers could manage all aspects of the drive control and had the capacity for battery management. MOSFETs are used in vehicles such as automobiles, cars, trucks, electric vehicles, and smart cars. MOSFETs are used for the electronic control unit (ECU), while the power MOSFET and IGBT are used as the load drivers for automotive loads such as motors, solenoids, ignition coils, relays, heaters and lamps. In 2000, the average mid-range passenger vehicle had an estimated $100–200 of power semiconductor content, increasing by a potential 3–5 times for electric and hybrid vehicles. As of 2017, the average vehicle has over 50 actuators, typically controlled by power MOSFETs or other power semiconductor devices.

Another important technology that enabled modern highway-capable electric cars is the lithium-ion battery. It was invented by John Goodenough, Rachid Yazami and Akira Yoshino in the 1980s, and commercialized by Sony and Asahi Kasei in 1991. The lithium-ion battery was responsible for the development of electric vehicles capable of long-distance travel, by the 2000s.

== Types ==
Automotive electronics or automotive embedded systems are distributed systems, and according to different domains in the automotive field, they can be classified into:

1. Engine electronics
2. Transmission electronics
3. Chassis electronics
4. Passive safety
5. Driver assistance
6. Passenger comfort
7. Entertainment systems
8. Electronic integrated cockpit systems

On average, a 2020s car has 50–150 chips, according to Chris Isidore of CNN Business.

=== Engine electronics ===
One of the most demanding electronic parts of an automobile is the engine control unit (ECU). Engine controls demand one of the highest real-time deadlines, as the engine itself is a very fast and complex part of the automobile. Of all the electronics in any car, the computing power of the engine control unit is the highest, typically a 32-bit processor.

A modern car may have up to 100 ECU's and a commercial vehicle up to 40.

An engine ECU controls such functions as:

In a diesel engine:

- Fuel injection rate
- Emission control, NOx control
- Regeneration of oxidation catalytic converter
- Turbocharger control
- Cooling system control
- Throttle control

In a gasoline engine:

- Lambda control
- OBD (On-Board Diagnostics)
- Cooling system control
- Ignition system control
- Lubrication system control (only a few have electronic control)
- Fuel injection rate control
- Throttle control

Many more engine parameters are actively monitored and controlled in real-time. There are about 20 to 50 that measure pressure, temperature, flow, engine speed, oxygen level and NOx level plus other parameters at different points within the engine. All these sensor signals are sent to the ECU, which has the logic circuits to do the actual controlling. The ECU output is connected to different actuators for the throttle valve, EGR valve, rack (in VGTs), fuel injector (using a pulse-width modulated signal), dosing injector and more. There are about 20 to 30 actuators in all.

=== Transmission electronics ===
These control the transmission system, mainly the shifting of the gears for better shift comfort and to lower torque interrupt while shifting. Automatic transmissions use controls for their operation, and also many semi-automatic transmissions having a fully automatic clutch or a semi-auto clutch (declutching only). The engine control unit and the transmission control exchange messages, sensor signals and control signals for their operation.

=== Chassis electronics ===
The chassis system has a lot of sub-systems which monitor various parameters and are actively controlled:

- ABS – Anti-lock Braking System
- ASR / TCS – Anti Slip Regulation / Traction Control System
- BAS – Brake Assist
- EBD – Electronic Brakeforce Distribution
- EDC – Electronic Damper Control
- EDS – Electronic Differential Slippery
- ESP – Electronic Stability Program
- ETS – Enhanced Traction System
- PA – Parking Assistance

=== Passive safety ===
These systems are always ready to act when there is a collision in progress or to prevent it when it senses a dangerous situation:

- Air bags
- Hill descent control
- Emergency brake assist system

=== Driver assistance ===
- Lane assist systems
- Speed assist system
- Blind spot detection
- Park assist system
- Adaptive cruise control system
- Pre-collision Assist

=== Passenger comfort ===
- Automatic climate control
- Electronic seat adjustment with memory
- Automatic wipers
- Automatic headlamps - adjusts beam automatically
- Automatic cooling - temperature adjustment

=== Entertainment systems ===
- Navigation system
- Vehicle audio
- Information access

All of the above systems form an infotainment system. Developmental methods for these systems vary according to each manufacturer. Different tools are used for both hardware and software development.

=== Electronic integrated cockpit systems ===
These are new generation hybrid ECUs that combine the functionalities of multiple ECUs of Infotainment Head Unit, Advanced Driver Assistance Systems (ADAS), Instrument Cluster, Rear Camera/Parking Assist, Surround View Systems etc. This saves on the cost of electronics as well as mechanical/physical parts like interconnects across ECUs etc. There is also a more centralized control so data can be seamlessly exchanged between the systems.

There are of course challenges too. Given the complexity of this hybrid system, a lot more rigor is needed to validate the system for robustness, safety and security. For example, if the infotainment system's application which could be running an open-source Android OS is breached, there could be possibility of hackers to take control of the car remotely and potentially misuse it for anti-social activities. Typically so, usage of a hardware+software enabled hypervisors are used to virtualize and create separate trust and safety zones that are immune to each other's failures or breaches. Lot of work is happening in this area and potentially will have such systems soon if not already.

== Functional safety requirements ==
In order to minimize the risk of dangerous failures, safety-related electronic systems have to be developed following the applicable product liability requirements. Disregard for, or inadequate application of these standards can lead to not only personal injuries, but also severe legal and economic consequences such as product cancellations or recalls.

The IEC 61508 standard, generally applicable to electrical/electronic/programmable safety-related products, is only partially adequate for automotive-development requirements. Consequently, for the automotive industry, this standard is replaced by the existing ISO 26262, currently released as a Final Draft International Standard (FDIS). ISO/DIS 26262 describes the entire product life-cycle of safety-related electrical/electronic systems for road vehicles. It has been published as an international standard in its final version in November 2011. The implementation of this new standard will result in modifications and various innovations in the automobile electronics development process, as it covers the complete product life-cycle from the concept phase until its decommissioning.

== Security ==
As more functions of the automobile are connected to short- or long-range networks, cybersecurity of systems against unauthorized modification is required. With critical systems such as engine controls, transmission, airbags, and braking connected to internal diagnostic networks, remote access could result in a malicious intruder altering the function of systems or disabling them, possibly causing injuries or fatalities. Every new interface presents a new "attack surface". The same facility that allows the owner to unlock and start a car from a smartphone app also presents risks due to remote access. Auto manufacturers may protect the memory of various control microprocessors both to secure them from unauthorized changes and also to ensure only manufacturer-authorized facilities can diagnose or repair the vehicle. Systems such as keyless entry rely on cryptographic techniques to ensure "replay" or "man-in-the-middle attacks" attacks cannot record sequences to allow later break-in to the automobile.

In 2015 the German general automobile club commissioned an investigation of the vulnerabilities of one manufacturer's electronics system, which could have led to such exploits as unauthorized remote unlocking of the vehicle.

== See also ==
- Cellport Systems
- Vetronics
- Advanced driver-assistance system (ADAS)
- Software Defined Vehicle (SDV)
