= List of companies listed on the Hong Kong Stock Exchange =

Companies on the Hong Kong Stock Exchange

This is a list of companies on the Hong Kong Stock Exchange (HKEx), ordered numerically by stock code. The names of the companies appear exactly as they do on the stock exchange listing. This is not an exhaustive list, but reflects the list that appears on HKEx's Hyperlink Directory. An exhaustive but un-linked list appears below the partial list.

== 0001 - 0099 ==
SEHK: 1 CK Hutchison Holdings
SEHK: 2 CLP Holdings Limited
SEHK: 3 The Hong Kong and China Gas Company Limited
SEHK: 4 The Wharf (Holdings) Limited
SEHK: 5 HSBC Holdings plc
SEHK: 6 Power Assets Holdings Limited
SEHK: 7 Hong Kong Finance Investment Holding Group Limited (formerly Hoifu Energy Group Limited)
SEHK: 8 PCCW Limited
SEHK: 9 Nine Express Limited
SEHK: 10 Hang Lung Group
SEHK: 11 Hang Seng Bank Ltd.
SEHK: 12 Henderson Land Development Co. Ltd.
SEHK: 14 Hysan Development Co. Ltd.
SEHK: 15 Vantage International (Holdings) Ltd.
SEHK: 16 Sun Hung Kai Properties Ltd.
SEHK: 17 New World Development Co., Ltd.
SEHK: 18 Oriental Press
SEHK: 19 Swire Pacific Ltd. A shares
SEHK: 20 Wheelock
SEHK: 22 Mexan
SEHK: 23 The Bank of East Asia, Ltd.
SEHK: 25 Chevalier International Holdings Ltd.
SEHK: 26 China Motor Bus
SEHK: 27 Galaxy Entertainment Group
SEHK: 29 Dynamic Holdings Limited
SEHK: 30 ABC Communications (Holdings) Ltd.
SEHK: 31 China Aerospace International Holdings Limited
SEHK: 32 The Cross-Harbour (Holdings) Limited
SEHK: 33 Asia Investment Finance Group Limited
SEHK: 34 Kowloon Development Company Ltd.
SEHK: 35 Far East Consortium International Ltd.
SEHK: 36 Far East Technology International Ltd.
SEHK: 37 Far East Hotels and Entertainment Ltd.
SEHK: 38 First Tractor Company Limited
SEHK: 39 China Beidahuang Industry Group Holdings Limited
SEHK: 40 Gold Peak Technology Group Ltd. (Formerly: Gold Peak Industries (Holdings) Ltd.)
SEHK: 41 Great Eagle Holdings
SEHK: 42 Northeast Electric Development Company Limited
SEHK: 43 C.P. Pokphand Co. Ltd.
SEHK: 44 Hong Kong Aircraft Engineering Company
SEHK: 45 The Hongkong and Shanghai Hotels, Limited
SEHK: 46 Computer & Technologies Holdings Ltd.
SEHK: 47 Hop Hing Group Holdings Limited
SEHK: 48 China Automotive Interior Decoration Holdings Limited
SEHK: 50 Hong Kong Ferry (Holdings) Co. Ltd.
SEHK: 51 Harbour Centre Development
SEHK: 52 Fairwood Holdings Limited
SEHK: 53 Guoco Group
SEHK: 54 Hopewell Holdings Limited
SEHK: 55 Neway Group Holdings Ltd. formerly Chung Tai Printing Holdings Ltd.
SEHK: 56 Allied Properties (H.K.) Ltd.
SEHK: 57 Chen Hsong Holdings Ltd.
SEHK: 58 Sunway International Holdings Ltd.
SEHK: 59 Skyfame Realty (Holdings) Limited
SEHK: 61 Venture International Investment Holdings Limited
SEHK: 62 Transport International Holdings Limited (Formerly: KMB Holdings)
SEHK: 63 Winfoong Int'l
SEHK: 64 Get Nice Holdings Ltd.
SEHK: 65 De Team Co Ltd.
SEHK: 66 MTR Corporation Ltd.
SEHK: 68 Manycore Tech Inc.
SEHK: 69 Shangri-La Asia Ltd.
SEHK: 70 Neptune Group
SEHK: 71 Miramar Hotel and Investment
SEHK: 74 Great Wall Technology Company Ltd.
SEHK: 75 Y. T. Realty Group Limited
SEHK: 76 South Sea Petroleum Holdings Limited
SEHK: 77 AMS Public Transport Holdings Limited
SEHK: 78 Regal Hotels International Holdings Limited
SEHK: 79 Century Legend
SEHK: 80 China New Economy Fund Ltd.
SEHK: 81 Shell Electric
SEHK: 82 VODONE (Formerly: Yanion International Holdings Ltd.)
SEHK: 83 Sino Land Co. Ltd.
SEHK: 84 Stelux Holdings Int'l Ltd.
SEHK: 86 Sun Hung Kai & Co. Ltd.
SEHK: 87 Swire Pacific Ltd. B shares
SEHK: 89 Tai Sang Land Development Ltd.
SEHK: 92 Champion Technology Holdings Ltd.
SEHK: 94 Greenheart Group
SEHK: 95 New Heritage Holdings Ltd.
SEHK: 96 Yusei Holdings Ltd.
SEHK: 97 Henderson Investment Ltd.
SEHK: 98 Xingfa Aluminium Holdings Limited
SEHK: 99 Wongs Int'l

== 0100 - 0198 ==
SEHK: 100 MiniMax Group Inc.
SEHK: 101 Hang Lung Properties
SEHK: 102 Arnhold Holdings Ltd.
SEHK: 103 Shougang Concord Century Holdings Ltd.
SEHK: 104 Asia Commercial Holdings Limited
SEHK: 105 Associated International Hotels Limited
SEHK: 106 Landsea Green Group Co., Ltd.
SEHK: 107 Sichuan Expressway Co. Ltd.
SEHK: 109 Wonderful World Holdings Ltd.
SEHK: 110 Fortune Telecom Holdings Limited
SEHK: 112 Chi Cheung Investment Co. Ltd.
SEHK: 113 Dickson Concepts (International) Ltd.
SEHK: 114 Herald Holdings Ltd.
SEHK: 116 Chow Sang Sang Holdings Int'l Ltd.
SEHK: 117 EYANG Holdings (Group) Co., Ltd.
SEHK: 118 Cosmos Machinery Enterprises Ltd.
SEHK: 119 Poly Property Group Co., Ltd.
SEHK: 120 Cosmopolitan International Holdings Ltd.
SEHK: 121 Chia Tai Enterprises International Ltd.
SEHK: 122 Crocodile Garments
SEHK: 123 Yuexiu Property
SEHK: 124 Kingway Brewery Holdings Limited
SEHK: 127 Chinese Estates Holdings
SEHK: 128 ENM Holdings Limited
SEHK: 129 Asia Standard Int'l Group Ltd.
SEHK: 130 Moiselle International Holdings Limited
SEHK: 131 Cheuk Nang Holding Limited
SEHK: 132 China Investment Holding Limited
SEHK: 133 China Merchants China Direct Investments Ltd.
SEHK: 135 Kunlun Energy
SEHK: 136 Mascotte Holdings Ltd.
SEHK: 138 CCT Telecom Holdings Ltd.
SEHK: 139 139 Holdings Ltd.
SEHK: 142 First Pacific
SEHK: 144 China Merchants Holdings (Int'l) Co. Ltd.
SEHK: 146 Tai Ping Carpets Int'l Ltd.
SEHK: 147 Graneagle Holdings Ltd.
SEHK: 148 Kingboard Holdings (formerly known as Kingboard Chemical)
SEHK: 149 China Agri-Products Exchange Ltd.
SEHK: 151 Want Want China
SEHK: 152 Shenzhen International Holdings
SEHK: 154 Beijing Development (Hong Kong) Ltd.
SEHK: 155 China Solar Energy Holdings Ltd.
SEHK: 156 Lippo China Resources Limited
SEHK: 158 Melbourne Enterprises Ltd.
SEHK: 163 Emperor International Holdings Limited
SEHK: 164 China Baoli Technologies Holdings Ltd.
SEHK: 165 China Everbright Limited
SEHK: 166 New Times Group Holdings Ltd.
SEHK: 167 IDT Int'l Ltd.
SEHK: 168 Tsingtao Brewery
SEHK: 169 China Fair Land Holdings Limited
SEHK: 171 Silver Grant International Industries Ltd.
SEHK: 173 K. Wah International Holdings Ltd.
SEHK: 174 Kee Shing (Holdings) Ltd.
SEHK: 175 Geely Automobile Holdings Ltd.
SEHK: 176 United Pacific Industries Ltd.
SEHK: 177 Jiangsu Expressway Company
SEHK: 178 Sa Sa Int'l Holdings Ltd.
SEHK: 179 Johnson Electric Holdings Ltd.
SEHK: 182 Concord New Energy Group Limited
SEHK: 183 CITIC International Financial Holdings Limited
SEHK: 186 Grande Holdings
SEHK: 188 SW Kingsway Capital Holdings Ltd.
SEHK: 189 Dongyue Group Limited
SEHK: 190 Hong Kong Construction (Holdings) Ltd.
SEHK: 191 Lai Sun Garment (International) Limited
SEHK: 193 Capital Estate Limited
SEHK: 194 Liu Chong Hing Investment Ltd.
SEHK: 196 Honghua Group Limited
SEHK: 197 Heng Tai Consumables Group Limited
SEHK: 198 SMI Corporation Limited

== 0200 - 0299 ==
SEHK: 200 Melco International Development Limited
SEHK: 201 Magnificent Estates Ltd.
SEHK: 202 Interchina Holdings Ltd.
SEHK: 203 Denway Motors Limited
SEHK: 204 Temujin International Investments Ltd.
SEHK: 205 SEEC Media Group Limited
SEHK: 207 Hong Kong Parkview Group
SEHK: 211 Styland Holdings Ltd.
SEHK: 213 National Electronics Holdings Limited
SEHK: 215 Hutchison Telecommunications Hong Kong Holdings
SEHK: 218 Shenyin Wanguo (HK) Ltd
SEHK: 220 Uni-President China Holdings Limited
SEHK: 221 LeRoi Holdings Ltd.
SEHK: 222 Min Xin Holdings Ltd.
SEHK: 223 Kenfair International (Holdings) Ltd.
SEHK: 224 Pioneer Global Group Ltd.
SEHK: 226 Lippo Limited
SEHK: 227 First Shanghai Investments Ltd.
SEHK: 228 China Energy Development Holdings Limited
SEHK: 230 ONFEM Holdings Ltd.
SEHK: 231 Dynamic Global Holdings Ltd.
SEHK: 232 CATIC International Holdings Ltd
SEHK: 233 Mingyuan Medicare Development Co., Ltd.
SEHK: 236 San Miguel Brewery Hong Kong
SEHK: 237 Safety Godown Co. Ltd.
SEHK: 238 Lei Shing Hong Ltd.
SEHK: 239 Pak Fa Yeow
SEHK: 242 Shun Tak Holdings Ltd.
SEHK: 243 QPL International Holdings Ltd.
SEHK: 244 Sincere Co. Ltd.
SEHK: 245 China Seven Star Shopping Ltd.
SEHK: 246 Henderson China Holdings Ltd.
SEHK: 247 Tsim Sha Tsui Properties Limited
SEHK: 248 HKC International Holdings Ltd.
SEHK: 250 Sino-i Technology Limited
SEHK: 251 S E A Holdings Ltd
SEHK: 252 Southeast Asia Properties & Finance Ltd.
SEHK: 255 Lung Kee (Bermuda) Holdings Ltd.
SEHK: 257 China Everbright International Ltd.
SEHK: 258 Tomson Group Ltd.
SEHK: 260 Sino Gas Group Ltd.
SEHK: 261 CCT Tech International Ltd.
SEHK: 263 Poly Investments Holdings Ltd.
SEHK: 264 Chanco International Group Limited
SEHK: 267 CITIC Pacific Ltd.
SEHK: 268 Kingdee International Software Group Company Limited
SEHK: 269 China Timber Resources Group Ltd.
SEHK: 270 Guangdong Investment
SEHK: 271 Dan Form Hldgs
SEHK: 272 Shui On Land Limited
SEHK: 273 Willie International Holdings Limited
SEHK: 274 Global Green
SEHK: 275 Hanny Holdings Ltd.
SEHK: 276 Mongolia Energy (Formerly: New World CyberBase Ltd.)
SEHK: 278 Wah Ha Realty Co. Ltd.
SEHK: 279 Inner Mongolia Development (Holdings) Limited
SEHK: 280 King Fook Holdings
SEHK: 282 Next Media
SEHK: 283 Matsunichi Communication Holdings Limited
SEHK: 285 BYD Electronic (International) Company Limited
SEHK: 286 G-Prop (Holdings) Ltd.
SEHK: 287 Winfair Inv.
SEHK: 288 Berjaya Holdings (HK) Ltd.
SEHK: 289 Wing On Company International Limited
SEHK: 291 China Resources Enterprises
SEHK: 293 Cathay Pacific Airways Ltd.
SEHK: 296 Emperor Entertainment Hotel Limited
SEHK: 297 Sinofert Holdings
SEHK: 298 Chuang's China Investments Ltd.
SEHK: 299 SinoCom Software Group Limited

== 0300 - 0395 ==
SEHK: 300 Shenji Group Kunming Machine Tool Co. Ltd.
SEHK: 301 Sun Fook Kong Holdings Limited
SEHK: 302 OCBC Wing Hang Bank Limited
SEHK: 303 VTech
SEHK: 304 Peace Mark (Holdings) Ltd.
SEHK: 306 Kwoon Chung Bus Holdings Ltd.
SEHK: 307 Tidetime Sun (Group) Ltd.
SEHK: 308 China Travel International Investment Hong Kong
SEHK: 309 Lo's Enviro-Pro Holdings Limited
SEHK: 310 Prosperity Investment Holdings Limited
SEHK: 311 Luen Thai Holdings Limited
SEHK: 313 Richly Field China Development Ltd
SEHK: 315 Smartone Telecommunications Holdings Ltd.
SEHK: 316 Orient Overseas (International) Limited
SEHK: 317 Guangzhou Shipyard International
SEHK: 318 Vongroup Ltd.
SEHK: 320 Computime Group Limited
SEHK: 321 Texwinca Holdings Ltd.
SEHK: 322 Tingyi (Cayman Islands) Holding Corporation
SEHK: 323 Maanshan Iron and Steel Co., Ltd.
SEHK: 326 China Star Entertainment Ltd.
SEHK: 327 Pax Global Limited
SEHK: 328 Alco Holdings Limited
SEHK: 329 Ruyan Group (Holdings) Limited
SEHK: 330 Esprit Holdings Ltd.
SEHK: 332 Ngai Lik Industrial Holdings Ltd.
SEHK: 333 Top Form International Ltd.
SEHK: 334 Proview International Holdings Ltd.
SEHK: 337 SPG Land (Holdings) Limited
SEHK: 338 Sinopec Shanghai Petrochemical Company Limited
SEHK: 340 China Mining Resources Group Limited
SEHK: 341 Cafe de Coral Holdings Ltd.
SEHK: 342 NewOcean Energy Holdings Limited
SEHK: 343 Culturecom Holdings Ltd.
SEHK: 345 Vitasoy Int'l Holdings Ltd.
SEHK: 346 Sino Union Petroleum & Chemical International Ltd.
SEHK: 347 Angang Steel Company
SEHK: 348 Lung Cheong International Holdings Ltd.
SEHK: 349 Industrial and Commercial Bank of China (Asia) Limited
SEHK: 352 Fortune Sun (China) Holdings Limited
SEHK: 357 HNA Infrastructure
SEHK: 358 Jiangxi Copper Co. Ltd.
SEHK: 359 China Haisheng Juice Holdings Co. Ltd.
SEHK: 361 Sino Golf Holdings Ltd.
SEHK: 363 Shanghai Industrial Holdings
SEHK: 365 Sun East Technology (Holdings) Ltd.
SEHK: 368 Sinotrans Shipping
SEHK: 369 Wing Tai Properties Limited
SEHK: 372 ITC Corporation Ltd.
SEHK: 373 Allied Group Ltd.
SEHK: 376 Asia TeleMedia Limited
SEHK: 377 Huajun International Group Limited
SEHK: 378 E2-Capital (Holdings) Limited
SEHK: 382 Hualing Holdings Limited
SEHK: 383 COL Capital Limited
SEHK: 386 China Petroleum & Chemical Corporation
SEHK: 387 Leeport (Holdings) Limited
SEHK: 388 Hong Kong Exchanges and Clearing Ltd.
SEHK: 389 Moulin Global Eyecare Holdings Limited
SEHK: 390 China Railway Group Limited
SEHK: 391 Mei Ah Entertainment Group Ltd.
SEHK: 392 Beijing Enterprises
SEHK: 393 Glorious Sun Enterprises Ltd.
SEHK: 395 China Zirconium Limited

== 0402 - 0498 ==
SEHK: 402 Ming Hing Holdings Limited
SEHK: 403 Starlite Holdings Ltd.
SEHK: 404 Hsin Chong Construction Group Ltd.
SEHK: 405 GZI Real Estate Investment Trust
SEHK: 406 Yau Lee Holdings Ltd.
SEHK: 408 Yip's Chemical Holdings Ltd.
SEHK: 409 Stone Group Holdings Limited
SEHK: 410 SOHO China Limited
SEHK: 411 Lam Soon (Hong Kong) Ltd.
SEHK: 416 GST Holdings Limited
SEHK: 418 Founder (Hong Kong) Ltd.
SEHK: 419 AsianUnion New Media (Group) Limited
SEHK: 420 Fountain Set (Holdings) Limited
SEHK: 422 Vietnam Manufacturing & Export Processing (Holdings) Limited
SEHK: 423 Hong Kong Economic Times Holdings Limited
SEHK: 425 Minth Group Limited
SEHK: 426 One Media Group Limited
SEHK: 431 Greater China Holdings Limited
SEHK: 435 Sunlight Real Estate Investment Trust
SEHK: 439 Kuangchi Science Limited
SEHK: 440 Dah Sing Financial Holdings Ltd
SEHK: 450 Hung Hing Printing Group Ltd.
SEHK: 464 Kenford Group Holdings Limited
SEHK: 470 WUXI LEAD INTELLIGENT EQUIPMENT CO., LTD.
SEHK: 475 Noble Jewelry Holdings Limited
SEHK: 480 HKR International
SEHK: 482 Sandmartin International Holdings Limited
SEHK: 483 Bauhaus International (Holdings) Limited
SEHK: 486 United Company RUSAL
SEHK: 488 Lai Sun Development Company Limited
SEHK: 489 Dongfeng Motor Group
SEHK: 491 See Corporation Limited
SEHK: 493 GOME Electrical Appliances
SEHK: 494 Li & Fung (Trading) Limited
SEHK: 496 Kasen International Holdings Limited
SEHK: 498 PYI Corporation Limited

== 0500 - 0599 ==
SEHK: 500 DVN (Holdings) Ltd.
SEHK: 501 OmniVision Integrated Circuits Group, Inc.
SEHK: 505 Huan Yue Interactive Holdings Limited
SEHK: 506 China Foods Limited
SEHK: 508 Chevalier Pacific Holdings Limited
SEHK: 511 Television Broadcasts Ltd.
SEHK: 513 Continental Holdings Ltd.
SEHK: 515 TC Interconnect Holdings Limited
SEHK: 517 COSCO Shipping International
SEHK: 518 Tungtex (Holdings) Company Ltd.
SEHK: 521 Shougang Concord Technology Holdings Ltd.
SEHK: 522 ASMPT
SEHK: 524 e-KONG Group Ltd.
SEHK: 525 Guangshen Railway Co., Ltd.
SEHK: 527 Galaxy Semi-Conductor Holdings Limited
SEHK: 530 Goldin Financial Holdings Ltd.
SEHK: 532 Wong's Kong King Int'l (Holdings) Ltd.
SEHK: 533 Goldlion Holdings Ltd.
SEHK: 535 Frasers Property (China) Limited
SEHK: 536 Tradelink Electronic Commerce Limited
SEHK: 537 RIGOL Technologies Co., Ltd.
SEHK: 538 Ajisen (China) Holdings Limited
SEHK: 543 Pacific Online Limited
SEHK: 544 Daido Group Limited
SEHK: 546 Fufeng Group
SEHK: 547 Sun Innovation Holdings Limited
SEHK: 548 Shenzhen Expressway Co. Ltd.
SEHK: 550 Recurit Holdings Limited
SEHK: 551 Yue Yuen Industrial Holdings
SEHK: 552 China Communications Services Corporation Limited
SEHK: 553 Panda Electronics
SEHK: 555 REXCAPITAL Financial Holdings Limited
SEHK: 558 L.K. Technology Holdings Limited
SEHK: 559 Hua Yi Copper Holdings Limited
SEHK: 560 Chu Kong Shipping Development Co Ltd.
SEHK: 562 BALtrans Holdings Ltd.
SEHK: 567 Daisho Microline Holdings Limited
SEHK: 568 Shandong Molong Petroleum Machinery Company Limited
SEHK: 569 China Automation Group Ltd.
SEHK: 570 Wing Shan International Ltd.
SEHK: 573 Tao Heung Holdings Ltd.
SEHK: 575 Regent Pacific Group Limited
SEHK: 576 Zhejiang Expressway Company
SEHK: 579 Chevalier Construction Holdings Ltd.
SEHK: 581 China Oriental Group Company Ltd.
SEHK: 583 SCMP Group Limited
SEHK: 585 Imagi International Holdings Limited
SEHK: 587 Hua Han Bio-Pharmaceutical Holdings Limited
SEHK: 588 Beijing North Star
SEHK: 589 PORTS Design Ltd.
SEHK: 590 Luk Fook Holdings (Int'l) Ltd.
SEHK: 592 Bossini International Holdings
SEHK: 593 Quality HealthCare Asia Ltd.
SEHK: 595 AV Concept Holdings Ltd.
SEHK: 598 Sinotrans
SEHK: 599 E.Bon Holdings

== 0601 - 0699 ==
SEHK: 600 Axera Semiconductor Co., Ltd.
SEHK: 601 Group Sense (International) Limited
SEHK: 603 China Oil and Gas Limited
SEHK: 604 Shenzhen Investment
SEHK: 605 K.P.I. Company Limited
SEHK: 606 China Agri-Industries Holdings Limited
SEHK: 607 Fullshare Holdings Limited
SEHK: 608 High Fashion International Limited
SEHK: 609 Tiande Chemical Holdings Limited
SEHK: 610 Wai Kee Holdings Limited
SEHK: 611 Tack Hsin Holdings Limited
SEHK: 612 China Investment Fund Company Limited
SEHK: 613 Yugang International Limited
SEHK: 616 Easyknit Enterprises Holdings Limited
SEHK: 617 Paliburg Holdings Limited
SEHK: 618 Peking University Resources (Holdings)
SEHK: 619 South China Financial Holdings Limited
SEHK: 620 UDL Holdings Limited
SEHK: 621 Wing Hing International (Holdings) Limited
SEHK: 622 Enerchina Holdings Limited
SEHK: 625 SHEIN Global Holdings Limited
SEHK: 626 Public Financial Holdings Limited
SEHK: 627 U-Right International
SEHK: 628 Teem Foundation Group Limited
SEHK: 629 Yue Da Holdings Limited
SEHK: 630 Jackin International Holdings Limited
SEHK: 632 Pearl Oriental Innovation Limited
SEHK: 636 Fubon Bank (Hong Kong) Limited
SEHK: 637 Lee Kee Holdings Limited
SEHK: 638 Kin Yat Holdings Limited
SEHK: 641 CHTC Fong's Industries Co., Ltd.
SEHK: 643 Carry Wealth Holdings Limited
SEHK: 645 KTP Holdings Limited
SEHK: 646 Yardway Group Limited
SEHK: 647 Joyce Boutique Holdings Limited
SEHK: 648 Softbank Investment International (Strategic) Limited
SEHK: 650 Shun Cheong Holdings Limited
SEHK: 651 Wonson International Holdings Limited
SEHK: 653 Bonjour Holdings Limited
SEHK: 655 Hongkong Chinese Limited
SEHK: 656 Fosun International Limited
SEHK: 657 G-Vision International (Holdings) Limited
SEHK: 658 China High Speed Transmission
SEHK: 659 NWS Holdings Limited
SEHK: 660 Nority International Group Limited
SEHK: 661 China National Resources Development Holdings Limited
SEHK: 663 Swank International Manufacturing Company Limited
SEHK: 664 HANGZHOU TONGSHIFU CULTURAL AND CREATIVE (GROUP) CO., LTD.
SEHK: 665 Taifook Securities Group Limited
SEHK: 666 Yu Ming Investments Limited
SEHK: 667 HannStar Board International Holdings Limited
SEHK: 668 Anker Innovations Technology Co., Ltd.
SEHK: 669 Techtronic Industries Company Limited
SEHK: 670 China Eastern Airlines Corporation Limited
SEHK: 673 China HealthCare Holdings Limited
SEHK: 674 United Power Investment Limited
SEHK: 675 K & P International Holdings Limited
SEHK: 677 Golden Resources Development International Limited
SEHK: 678 Star Cruises Limited
SEHK: 680 Nan Hai Corporation Limited
SEHK: 681 Chinese People Gas Holdings Company Limited
SEHK: 682 Chaoda Modern Agriculture (Holdings) Limited
SEHK: 683 Kerry Properties Limited
SEHK: 684 Allan International Holdings Limited
SEHK: 685 Media Chinese International Limited
SEHK: 686 Gay Giano International Group Limited
SEHK: 687 Tysan Holdings Limited
SEHK: 688 China Overseas Land & Investment Limited
SEHK: 690 Uni-Bio Science Group Limited
SEHK: 692 Ching Hing (Holdings) Limited
SEHK: 693 Tan Chong International Limited
SEHK: 694 Beijing Capital International Airport Company Limited
SEHK: 696 Travelsky Technology Limited
SEHK: 697 Shougang Concord International Enterprises Company Limited
SEHK: 698 Tongda Group Holdings Limited
SEHK: 699 Chia Hsin Cement Greater China Holding Corporation

== 0700 - 0778 ==
SEHK: 700 Tencent Holdings Limited
SEHK: 701 CNT Group Ltd.
SEHK: 702 Genesis Energy Holdings
SEHK: 703 Innovo Leisure Recreation Holdings Ltd.
SEHK: 706 FinTronics Holdings Company Limited
SEHK: 708 New Media Group Holdings Limited
SEHK: 709 Giordano International Limited
SEHK: 710 Varitronix International Ltd.
SEHK: 715 China Oceanwide Holdings Limited
SEHK: 716 Singamas Container Holdings Ltd.
SEHK: 717 Emperor Capital Group Limited
SEHK: 722 Delta Network, Inc.
SEHK: 723 Anex International Holdings Ltd.
SEHK: 725 Perennial International Ltd.
SEHK: 727 VXL Capital Limited
SEHK: 728 China Telecom Corporation Limited
SEHK: 729 Carico Holdings Limited
SEHK: 731 Samson Paper Holdings Limited
SEHK: 732 Truly International Holdings Limited
SEHK: 733 Hopefluent Group Holdings Limited
SEHK: 735 China Power New Energy Development Company Limited
SEHK: 736 China Properties Investment Holdings Ltd.
SEHK: 737 Hopewell Highway Infrastructure
SEHK: 738 Le Saunda Holdings Ltd.
SEHK: 746 Lee & Man Holding Limited
SEHK: 751 Skyworth Digital Holdings Co Ltd
SEHK: 752 Pico Far East Holdings Ltd.
SEHK: 753 Air China
SEHK: 754 Hopson Development
SEHK: 757 Solargiga Energy Holdings Limited
SEHK: 759 CEC International Holdings Ltd.
SEHK: 760 Tomorrow International Holdings Ltd
SEHK: 761 Peking Apparel Int'l Group Ltd.
SEHK: 762 China Unicom (Hong Kong) Limited
SEHK: 763 ZTE Corporation
SEHK: 769 China RareEarth
SEHK: 771 Automated Systems Holdings Ltd.]]
SEHK: 784 China Literature Ltd
SEHK: 773 China Metal Recycling
SEHK: 775 CK Life Sciences
SEHK: 778 Fortune REIT
SEHK: 784 AiLife International Group Limited
SEHK: 788 China Tower Corporation Limited

== 0800 - 0897 ==
SEHK: 800 A8 Digital Music Holdings
SEHK: 801 Golden Meditech Holdings
SEHK: 802 RCG Holdings
SEHK: 805 Glencore
SEHK: 806 Value Partners
SEHK: 809 Global Bio-chem Technology Group
SEHK: 813 Shimao Property
SEHK: 817 Franshion Properties
SEHK: 818 Hi Sun Technology
SEHK: 819 Tianneng Power International
SEHK: 820 HSBC China Dragon Fund
SEHK: 822 Ka Shui International
SEHK: 823 Link REIT
SEHK: 825 New World Department Store China
SEHK: 826 Tiangong International
SEHK: 828 Dynasty Fine Wines
SEHK: 831 Convenience Retail Asia
SEHK: 833 Alltronics
SEHK: 835 Asia Coal Limited
SEHK: 836 China Resources Power
SEHK: 838 EVA Precision Industrial
SEHK: 839 Anhui Tianda Oil Pipe Company
SEHK: 840 Xinjiang Tianye Water Saving Irrigation System Co
SEHK: 841 Asia Cassava Resources Holdings
SEHK: 845 Glorious Property Holdings
SEHK: 846 Mingfa Group
SEHK: 847 Kazakhmys
SEHK: 848 Maoye International
SEHK: 850 PetroAsian Energy Holdings
SEHK: 852 Strong Petrochemical Holdings
SEHK: 855 China Water Affairs Group
SEHK: 856 VST Holdings Limited
SEHK: 857 PetroChina
SEHK: 858 Extrawell Pharmaceutical
SEHK: 859 Henry Group Holdings
SEHK: 861 Digital China
SEHK: 862 Vision Values Holdings
SEHK: 867 China Medical System Holdings
SEHK: 868 Xinyi Glass Holdings Limited
SEHK: 869 Playmates Toys
SEHK: 870 Hang Fung Gold Technology
SEHK: 874 Guangzhou Pharmaceutical
SEHK: 878 Soundwill
SEHK: 880 SJM Holdings
SEHK: 881 Zhongsheng Group
SEHK: 882 Tianjin Development
SEHK: 883 China National Offshore Oil Corporation
SEHK: 885 Forefront Group
SEHK: 887 Emperor Watch & Jewellery
SEHK: 888 RoadShow
SEHK: 894 Man Yue
SEHK: 896 Hanison Construction
SEHK: 897 Wai Yuen Tong

== 0900 - 0999 ==
SEHK: 900 Aeon Credit Service Asia Co. Ltd.
SEHK: 901 Shenzhen SDMC Technology Co., Ltd.
SEHK: 902 Huaneng Power International
SEHK: 903 TPV Technology
SEHK: 904 China Green Holdings Ltd.
SEHK: 906 China Netcom Group Corporation (Hong Kong) Limited
SEHK: 907 Elegance International Holdings Ltd.
SEHK: 909 Zhongda International Holdings Ltd.
SEHK: 910 China Grand Forestry Green Resources Group
SEHK: 912 Suga International Holdings Ltd.
SEHK: 913 Unity Investments Holdings Ltd.
SEHK: 914 Anhui Conch Cement Company
SEHK: 915 Linmark Group Ltd.
SEHK: 916 Longyuan Power
SEHK: 918 Takson Holdings Ltd.
SEHK: 919 Modern Beauty Salon Holdings Limited
SEHK: 921 Hisense Kelon
SEHK: 926 Egana Jewellery & Pearls Ltd.
SEHK: 927 Fujikon Industrial Company Limited
SEHK: 929 IPE Group Limited
SEHK: 930 Asia Aluminum Holdings Ltd.
SEHK: 931 Artel Solutions Group Holdings Ltd.
SEHK: 938 Man Sang International Ltd.
SEHK: 939 China Construction Bank Corporation
SEHK: 941 China Mobile
SEHK: 943 eForce Holdings Limited
SEHK: 945 Manulife Financial
SEHK: 952 Quam Limited
SEHK: 958 Huaneng Renewables Corporation Limited
SEHK: 966 China Taiping Insurance Holdings
SEHK: 968 Little Sheep Group
SEHK: 969 Hua Lien International (Holding) Co. Ltd.
SEHK: 970 Jade Dynasty
SEHK: 973 L'Occitane
SEHK: 978 Tonic Industries Holdings Ltd.
SEHK: 980 Lianhua Supermarket Holdings Co. Ltd.
SEHK: 981 Semiconductor Manufacturing International Corporation
SEHK: 983 Shui On Construction and Materials Ltd.
SEHK: 985 China Sci-Tech Holdings Ltd.
SEHK: 987 J.I.C. Technology Co. Ltd.
SEHK: 988 The Sun's Group Limited
SEHK: 989 China Motion Telecom International Limited
SEHK: 990 Theme International Holdings Ltd.
SEHK: 991 Datang International Power Generation Co. Ltd.
SEHK: 992 Lenovo
SEHK: 993 Simsen International Corporation Ltd.
SEHK: 995 Anhui Expressway Co. Ltd.
SEHK: 996 Oriental Ginza Holdings Ltd.
SEHK: 998 China CITIC Bank
SEHK: 999 I.T Limited

== 1001 - 1099 ==
SEHK: 1001 Hong Kong Shanghai Alliance Holdings Ltd. (formerly Van Shung Chong Holdings Ltd.)
SEHK: 1002 V.S. International Group Ltd.
SEHK: 1003 GFT Holdings Ltd.
SEHK: 1004 Rising Development Holdings Ltd.
SEHK: 1007 Daqing Dairy Holdings Ltd.
SEHK: 1010 Pacmos Technologies Holdings Limited
SEHK: 1013 Wai Chun Group Holdings Limited
SEHK: 1019 Convoy Financial Services
SEHK: 1021 Guangdong Huayan Robotics Co., Ltd.
SEHK: 1025 Wumart
SEHK: 1029 IRC Limited
SEHK: 1030 Future Land Development Holdings Limited
SEHK: 1033 Yizeng Chemical Fibre
SEHK: 1036 Winsor Properties Holdings Ltd.
SEHK: 1037 Daiwa Associate Holdings Ltd.
SEHK: 1038 Cheung Kong Infrastructure Holdings Limited
SEHK: 1043 Coslight Technology International Group Limited
SEHK: 1044 Hengan International
SEHK: 1045 APT Satellite Holdings Limited
SEHK: 1046 Universe International Holdings Limited
SEHK: 1047 Ngai Hing Hong Co. Ltd.
SEHK: 1049 Celestial Asia Securities Holdings Ltd.
SEHK: 1050 Karrie International Holdings Ltd.
SEHK: 1052 GZI Transport
SEHK: 1053 Chongqing Iron and Steel Company
SEHK: 1055 China Southern Airlines Company Ltd.
SEHK: 1059 Kantone Holdings Ltd.
SEHK: 1062 China Development Bank International Investment Limited
SEHK: 1063 Suncorp Technologies Limited
SEHK: 1064 Zhong Hua International Holdings Limited
SEHK: 1065 Tianjin Capital Environmental Protection Co. Ltd.
SEHK: 1068 Yurun Group
SEHK: 1070 TCL Multimedia Technology Holdings Limited
SEHK: 1071 Huadian Power International
SEHK: 1072 Dongfang Electric
SEHK: 1079 PINE Technology Holdings Limited
SEHK: 1081 Dajin Heavy Industry Co., Ltd.
SEHK: 1083 Towngas China
SEHK: 1088 China Shenhua Energy
SEHK: 1093 China Pharmaceutical Group Limited
SEHK: 1094 Sunny Global Holdings Ltd.
SEHK: 1097 CTF Media and Entertainment Limited
SEHK: 1098 Road King Infrastructure Ltd.
SEHK: 1099 Sinopharm Group

== 1100 - 1199 ==
SEHK: 1100 Mainland Headwear Holdings Ltd.
SEHK: 1105 Sing Tao News Corporation
SEHK: 1108 Luoyang Glass
SEHK: 1109 China Resources Land
SEHK: 1111 Chong Hing Bank
SEHK: 1114 Brilliance Automotive
SEHK: 1116 Huiyuan Cowins Technology Group Limited
SEHK: 1118 Golik Holdings Ltd.
SEHK: 1123 China-Hongkong Photo Products Holdings Ltd.
SEHK: 1124 Coastal Greenland Limited
SEHK: 1126 Dream International Limited
SEHK: 1128 Wynn Macau
SEHK: 1129 China Water Industry Group
SEHK: 1132 Golden Harvest
SEHK: 1133 Harbin Power Equipment
SEHK: 1135 Asia Satellite Telecommunications Holdings Limited
SEHK: 1137 City Telecom
SEHK: 1138 COSCO Shipping Energy
SEHK: 1142 Rontex International Holdings Limited
SEHK: 1145 Courage Marine Group
SEHK: 1150 Milan Station Holdings Ltd
SEHK: 1157 Zoomlion
SEHK: 1160 Grand Investment International Limited
SEHK: 1161 Water Oasia Group Ltd.
SEHK: 1166 Solartech International Holdings Limited
SEHK: 1168 Sinolink Worldwide Holdings Ltd.
SEHK: 1169 Haier Electronics Group Co. Ltd.
SEHK: 1170 Kingmaker Footwear Holdings Limited
SEHK: 1171 Yanzhou Coal Mining Company
SEHK: 1172 Midas International Holdings Ltd.
SEHK: 1173 Veeko International Holdings Ltd.
SEHK: 1174 Pacific Andes International Holdings Ltd.
SEHK: 1178 Vitop Bioenergy Holdings Limited
SEHK: 1179 Mirabell International Holdings Ltd.
SEHK: 1180 LifeTec Group Ltd.
SEHK: 1185 China Energine International (Holdings) Limited
SEHK: 1186 China Railway Construction Corporation Limited
SEHK: 1187 Cofoe Medical Technology Co., Ltd.
SEHK: 1189 Wing On Travel (Holdings) Ltd.
SEHK: 1190 Bolina Holding Company Limited
SEHK: 1191 China Rich Holdings Ltd.
SEHK: 1192 Titan Petrochemicals Group Ltd.
SEHK: 1193 China Resources Gas
SEHK: 1194 China Force Oil & Grains Industrial Holdings Co., Ltd.
SEHK: 1198 Royale Furniture Holdings
SEHK: 1199 COSCO Shipping Ports

== 1200–1999 ==
SEHK: 1200 Midland Holdings
SEHK: 1201 Tesson Holdings
SEHK: 1202 Chengdu Putian
SEHK: 1203 Guangnan(Holdings)
SEHK: 1205 CITIC Resources
SEHK: 1208 MMG Limited
SEHK: 1210 Christine International Holdings
SEHK: 1211 BYD Company
SEHK: 1212 Lifestyle Int'l
SEHK: 1215 Kai Yuan Holdings
SEHK: 1217 China Innovation Investment Ltd.
SEHK: 1218 Easyknit Int'l
SEHK: 1220 Ocean Grand Holdings Ltd.
SEHK: 1221 Sino Hotels (Holdings) Ltd.
SEHK: 1222 Wang On Group Ltd.
SEHK: 1224 C C Land
SEHK: 1225 Lerado Group (Holdings) Co. Ltd.
SEHK: 1226 Garron Int'l
SEHK: 1227 China Financial and Industrial Inv.
SEHK: 1228 Tak Shun Technology Group Ltd.
SEHK: 1229 Nan Nan Resources Enterprise Limited
SEHK: 1232 Golden Wheel Tiandi Holdings Company Limited
SEHK: 1233 Times Property Holdings Limited
SEHK: 1234 China Lilang Limited
SEHK: 1235 Travel Expert (Asia) Enterprises Limited
SEHK: 1236 SHENZHEN LDROBOT CO., LTD
SEHK: 1237 China Environmental Technology and Bioenergy Holdings Limited
SEHK: 1238 Powerlong Real Estate Holdings Limited
SEHK: 1239 Teamway International Group Holdings Limited
SEHK: 1240 CNQC International Holdings Limited
SEHK: 1241 Shuanghua Holdings Limited
SEHK: 1243 Wang On Properties Limited
SEHK: 1245 Niraku GC Holdings, Inc.
SEHK: 1246 Ngai Shun Holdings Limited
SEHK: 1247 Miko International Holdings Limited
SEHK: 1249 Tonly Electronics Holdings Limited
SEHK: 1250 Shandong Hi-Speed New Energy Group Limited
SEHK: 1251 SPT Energy Group Inc.
SEHK: 1252 China Tianrui Group Cement Company Limited
SEHK: 1253 China Greenland Broad Greenstate Group Company Limited
SEHK: 1255 S. Culture International Holdings Limited
SEHK: 1256 Beijing ESWIN Computing Technology Co., Ltd.
SEHK: 1258 China Nonferrous Mining Corporation Limited
SEHK: 1259 China Child Care Corporation Limited
SEHK: 1260 Wonderful Sky Financial Group Holdings Limited
SEHK: 1262 Labixiaoxin Snacks Group Limited
SEHK: 1263 PC Partner Group Limited
SEHK: 1265 Tianjin Jinran Public Utilities Company Limited
SEHK: 1266 Xiwang Special Steel Company Limited
SEHK: 1268 China MeiDong Auto Holdings Limited
SEHK: 1269 China First Capital Group Limited
SEHK: 1270 Langham Hospitality Investments
SEHK: 1271 Grand Ming Group Holdings Limited
SEHK: 1272 Datang Environment Industry Group Co., Ltd.
SEHK: 1273 Hong Kong Finance Group Limited
SEHK: 1275 New Century REIT
SEHK: 1278 China New Town Development Company Limited
SEHK: 1288 Agricultural Bank of China
SEHK: 1298 Techcomp (Holdings) Limited
SEHK: 1299 American International Assurance
SEHK: 1313 China Resources Cement
SEHK: 1316 Nexteer Automotive
SEHK: 1333 China Zhongwang
SEHK: 1336 New China Life Insurance
SEHK: 1338 B&W International (Group) Holdings Limited
SEHK: 1339 People's Insurance Company of China
SEHK: 1359 China Cinda Asset Management
SEHK: 1361 361 Degrees
SEHK: 1364 Good me
SEHK: 1368 Xtep International Holdings Limited
SEHK: 1377 Guangdong Dtech Technology Co., Ltd.
SEHK: 1383 Hong Long Holdings Limited
SEHK: 1388 Embry Form Holdings
SEHK: 1392 Shenzhen HQVT Technology Co., Ltd.
SEHK: 1393 Hidili Industry International Development Limited
SEHK: 1398 Industrial and Commercial Bank of China Limited
SEHK: 1399 SCUD Group Limited
SEHK: 1402 I-Control Holdings Ltd
SEHK: 1511 UISEE Technologies (Beijing) Co., Ltd.
SEHK: 1553 Maike Tube Industry Holdings Ltd
SEHK: 1609 STAR SPORTS MEDICINE CO., LTD.
SEHK: 1618 Metallurgical Corporation of China Limited
SEHK: 1641 Hongxing Coldchain (Hunan) Co., Ltd.
SEHK: 1688 LINGYI iTECH (GUANGDONG) COMPANY
SEHK: 1691 JS Global Life
SEHK: 1692 Town Ray Holdings Limited
SEHK: 1700 Springland International
SEHK: 1708 Nanjing Sample Technology Company Limited
SEHK: 1716 Most Kwai Chung
SEHK: 1752 Top Education Group Ltd
SEHK: 1766 CRRC
SEHK: 1768 BUSY MING GROUP CO., LTD.
SEHK: 1770 DKE Holding Company Limited
SEHK: 1776 Guangfa Securities Co., Ltd.
SEHK: 1777 Fantasia Holdings
SEHK: 1779 LongBio Pharma (Suzhou) Co., Ltd.
SEHK: 1786 CRCC High-tech Equipment Corp., Ltd.
SEHK: 1800 China Communications Construction
SEHK: 1801 Innovent Biologics
SEHK: 1808 Tai-I International Holdings Limited
SEHK: 1810 Xiaomi Corp.
SEHK: 1812 Chenming Paper
SEHK: 1813 KWG Property
SEHK: 1818 Zhaojin Mining Industry Company
SEHK: 1822 Perception Digital
SEHK: 1828 Dah Chong Hong Holdings Ltd.
SEHK: 1838 China Properties Group
SEHK: 1862 Sino Gold Mining
SEHK: 1863 Changsheng China Property Company Limited
SEHK: 1868 Neo-Neon Holdings
SEHK: 1879 Shanghai Xizhi Technology Co., Ltd.
SEHK: 1880 Belle International
SEHK: 1881 Regal REIT
SEHK: 1882 Haitian International Holdings Limited
SEHK: 1883 CITIC 1616 Holdings
SEHK: 1886 Huiyuan Juice Group
SEHK: 1888 Kingboard Laminates Holdings Limited
SEHK: 1889 Wuyi International Pharmaceutical Company Limited
SEHK: 1893 China National Materials Company
SEHK: 1898 China Coal Energy Company
SEHK: 1899 Xingda International Holdings Ltd.
SEHK: 1910 Samsonite
SEHK: 1913 Prada
SEHK: 1918 Sunac China
SEHK: 1919 China COSCO Holdings Company Limited
SEHK: 1928 Sands China Ltd.
SEHK: 1929 Chow Tai Fook Jewellery Group
SEHK: 1945 Zero2IPO
SEHK: 1956 Beijing Zhongke WengeAI Science and Technology Co., Ltd.
SEHK: 1958 BAIC Motor Corporation Limited
SEHK: 1963 Bank of Chongqing
SEHK: 1968 Peak Sport
SEHK: 1972 Swire Properties
SEHK: 1973 Tiantu Capital
SEHK: 1988 Minsheng Banking Corp
SEHK: 1997 Wharf Real Estate Investment Company Limited

== 2000–2299 ==
SEHK: 2000 SIM Technology Group Limited
SEHK: 2002 Sunshine Paper Holdings Company Limited
SEHK: 2005 Lijun International Pharmaceutical (Holding) Co. Ltd.
SEHK: 2006 Shanghai Jinjiang International Hotels (Group) Company Limited
SEHK: 2007 Country Garden Holdings Co. Ltd.
SEHK: 2008 Phoenix Satellite Television Holdings
SEHK: 2009 BBMG Corporation
SEHK: 2010 Real Nutriceutical Group Ltd.
SEHK: 2011 KEE Holdings Co. Ltd.
SEHK: 2012 Sunshine Oilsands Ltd.
SEHK: 2018 AAC Acoustic Technologies Holdings Inc.
SEHK: 2020 Anta Sports
SEHK: 2028 Jolimark Holdings Limited
SEHK: 2030 CN Logistics International
SEHK: 2038 Foxconn International Holdings Limited
SEHK: 2039 China International Marine Containers
SEHK: 2041 Medcaptain Medical Technology Co., Ltd.
SEHK: 2076 Kanzhun Limited
SEHK: 2086 HNA Technology Investments Holdings Limited
SEHK: 2088 Xiwang Sugar Holdings Company Limited
SEHK: 2099 China Gold International Resources
SEHK: 2158 Naixue
SEHK: 2160 MicroPort CardioFlow Medtech Corporation-B
SEHK: 2161 JBM (Healthcare) Limited
SEHK: 2168 Yingde Gases
SEHK: 2196 Fosun Pharmaceutical
SEHK: 2200 Hosa International Limited
SEHK: 2208 Goldwind Science and Technology
SEHK: 2222 NVC Lighting Technology Corporation
SEHK: 2228 XtalPi
SEHK: 2238 Guangzhou Automobile Group
SEHK: 2249 NEXCHIP SEMICONDUCTOR (CHINA) LIMITED
SEHK: 2261 NASN Intelligent Tech (Zhejiang) Co., Ltd.
SEHK: 2266 Kosmopolito Hotels International Limited
SEHK: 2272 KEYTOP PARKING INC.
SEHK: 2282 MGM China
SEHK: 2290 Lung Fung Group Holdings Limited

== 2300 - 2398 ==
SEHK: 2300 AMVIG Holdings Limited
SEHK: 2307 Kam Hing International Holdings Limited
SEHK: 2309 Birmingham International Holdings
SEHK: 2314 Lee & Man Paper
SEHK: 2318 Ping An Insurance
SEHK: 2319 Mengniu Dairy
SEHK: 2320 Hop Fung Group Holdings Limited
SEHK: 2322 Sam Woo Holdings Limited
SEHK: 2323 China HKbridgeHoldings Limited.
SEHK: 2326 BEP International Holdings Limited
SEHK: 2328 PICC Property & Casualty Company Limited
SEHK: 2330 Quaypoint Corporation
SEHK: 2331 Li Ning Company Limited
SEHK: 2332 Hutchison Telecommunications International Limited
SEHK: 2333 Great Wall Motor
SEHK: 2337 Shanghai Forte Land
SEHK: 2338 Weichai Power
SEHK: 2339 Norstar Founders Group Limited
SEHK: 2340 Synergis Holdings Limited
SEHK: 2341 Ecogreen Fine Chemicals Group Limited
SEHK: 2342 Comba Telecom Systems Holdings Limited
SEHK: 2343 Pacific Basin Shipping
SEHK: 2345 Shanghai Prime Machinery Company Limited
SEHK: 2348 Dawnrays Pharmaceutical Holdings Limited.
SEHK: 2349 Wah Yuen Holdings Limited
SEHK: 2355 Baoye Group Company Limited
SEHK: 2356 Dah Sing Bank Limited
SEHK: 2368 Eagle Nice International Holdings Limited
SEHK: 2371 China Chuanglian Education Group Limited
SEHK: 2378 Prudential plc
SEHK: 2379 Zhongtian International Limited
SEHK: 2380 China Power International Development
SEHK: 2382 Sunny Optical Technology (Group) Co. Ltd.
SEHK: 2383 TOM Group Limited
SEHK: 2384 Suzhou Dongshan Precision Manufacturing Co., Ltd.
SEHK: 2387 Integrated Distribution Services Group Limited
SEHK: 2388 BOC Hong Kong (Holdings)
SEHK: 2398 Good Friend International Holdings Inc.

== 2400 - 2599 ==
SEHK: 2438 Mobvoi Inc.
SEHK: 2440 MemeStrategy, Inc.
SEHK: 2475 Luxshare Precision Industry Co., Ltd.
SEHK: 2476 Victory Giant Technology (HuiZhou) Co., Ltd.
SEHK: 2493 Mabwell (Shanghai) Bioscience Co., Ltd.
SEHK: 2498 RoboSense Technology Co., Ltd
SEHK: 2513 Z.AI CO., LTD.
SEHK: 2526 Hangzhou Diagens Biotechnology Co., Ltd.
SEHK: 2533 Black Sesame Technologies International Holding Ltd.
SEHK: 2553 BEIJING SHOUGANG LANZATECH TECHNOLOGY CO., LTD.
SEHK: 2577 Innoscience (Suzhou) Technology Holding Co., Ltd.

== 2600–2799 ==
SEHK: 2600 Aluminum Corporation of China Limited
SEHK: 2601 China Pacific Insurance
SEHK: 2607 Shanghai Pharmaceuticals
SEHK: 2618 TCL Communication Technology Holdings Limited
SEHK: 2628 China Life Insurance Company Limited
SEHK: 2632 JIANGSU NEW VISION AUTOMOTIVE ELECTRONICS CO., LTD.
SEHK: 2633 Jacobson Pharma Corporation Limited
SEHK: 2636 Shenzhen Transsion Holdings Co., Ltd.
SEHK: 2649 ALSCO Pooling Service Co., Ltd.
SEHK: 2660 Zengame Technology Holding Ltd.
SEHK: 2662 Camsing International Holding Limited
SEHK: 2667 Beijing Tong Ren Tang Healthcare Investment Co., Ltd.
SEHK: 2668 Pak Tak International Ltd.
SEHK: 2675 Shenzhen Edge Medical Co., Ltd.
SEHK: 2677 Distinct Healthcare Holdings Limited
SEHK: 2678 Texhong Textile Group Ltd.
SEHK: 2681 HOSIN Electronics Co., LTD.
SEHK: 2688 ENN Energy Holdings Ltd.
SEHK: 2689 Nine Dragons Paper Holdings Limited
SEHK: 2692 Shenzhen Zhaowei Machinery & Electronics Co., Ltd.
SEHK: 2700 Grenn International Holdings Limited
SEHK: 2701 Nsing Technologies Inc.
SEHK: 2706 Beijing Haizhi Technology Group Co., Ltd.
SEHK: 2714 Muyuan Foods Co., Ltd.
SEHK: 2715 ESTUN AUTOMATION CO., LTD
SEHK: 2718 Mininglamp Technology
SEHK: 2720 Ridge Outdoor International Limited
SEHK: 2722 Chongqing Machinery & Electric Co.
SEHK: 2723 Beijing DeepZero Technology Co., Ltd.
SEHK: 2726 Epiworld International Co., Ltd.
SEHK: 2727 Shanghai Electric Group
SEHK: 2728 Jintai Energy Holdings Limited
SEHK: 2729 Zhejiang Galaxis Technology Group Co., Ltd.
SEHK: 2738 [[
SEHK: 2768 Qingdao Gon Technology Co., Ltd.
SEHK: 2772 [[
SEHK: 2777 R&F Properties
SEHK: 2778 Champion REIT
SEHK: 2779 [[
SEHK: 2788 Chuangxin Industries Holdings Limited
SEHK: 2789 Yuanda China Holdings Ltd.
SEHK: 2797 Jiangxi Qiyunshan Food Co., Ltd.
SEHK: 2788 [[
SEHK: 2799 [[

== ETF funds ==
SEHK: 2800 Tracker Fund of Hong Kong
SEHK: 2801 iShares MSCI China Tracker ETF
SEHK: 2809 Lyxor CMDTY ETF
SEHK: 2810 Lyxor India ETF
SEHK: 2812 Lyxor World ETF
SEHK: 2813 Lyxor Korea ETF
SEHK: 2819 ABF Hong Kong Bond Index Fund
SEHK: 2821 ABF Pan Asia Bond Index Fund
SEHK: 2822 CSOP A50 ETF (in HK$)
SEHK: 2823 iShares FTSE A50 China Index ETF
SEHK: 2828 Hang Seng H-Share Index ETF
SEHK: 2832 Bosera FTSE China A50 Index ETF (in HK$)
SEHK: 2836 iShares BSE SENSEX India Tracker
SEHK: 2838 Hang Seng FTSE China 25 Index ETF

== 2866–2899 ==
SEHK: 2866 China Shipping Container Lines
SEHK: 2868 Beijing Capital Land
SEHK: 2877 China Shineway Pharmaceutical
SEHK: 2878 Solomon Systech
SEHK: 2880 Dalian Port (PDA) Company
SEHK: 2882 Hong Kong Resources Holdings
SEHK: 2883 China Oilfield Services
SEHK: 2888 Standard Chartered Hong Kong
SEHK: 2889 China Nickel Resources Holdings
SEHK: 2898 Long Far Pharmaceutical
SEHK: 2899 Zijin Mining

== 3000–3999 ==
SEHK: 3200 SHENZHEN HAN’S CNC TECHNOLOGY CO., LTD.
SEHK: 3223 Ingenic Semiconductor Co., Ltd.
SEHK: 3228 Shenzhen Kinwong Electronic Co., Ltd.
SEHK: 3231 Excelland Robotics (Wuxi) Co. Ltd.
SEHK: 3268 MeiG Smart Technology Co., Ltd.
SEHK: 3277 Gpixel Changchun Microelectronics Inc.
SEHK: 3288 FOSHAN HAITIAN FLAVOURING AND FOOD COMPANY LTD.
SEHK: 3296 Huaqin Co., Ltd.
SEHK: 3300 China Glass Holdings Ltd.
SEHK: 3303 Jutal Offshore Oil Services Limited
SEHK: 3308 ZHONGJI INNOLIGHT CO., LTD.
SEHK: 3311 China State Construction International Holdings Limited
SEHK: 3313 Meadville Holdings Limited
SEHK: 3318 China Flavors and Fragrances Company Limited
SEHK: 3323 China National Building Material Company
SEHK: 3326 East Nova Holdings Limited
SEHK: 3328 Bank of Communications
SEHK: 3330 Lingbao Gold
SEHK: 3331 Vinda International
SEHK: 3333 Evergrande Real Estate Group
SEHK: 3337 Anton Oilfield Services Group
SEHK: 3339 Lonking Holdings
SEHK: 3344 Addchance Holdings Limited
SEHK: 3355 FS.COM Limited
SEHK: 3360 Far East Horizon
SEHK: 3368 Parkson
SEHK: 3377 Sino-Ocean Land
SEHK: 3378 Xiamen International Port Co. Ltd.
SEHK: 3382 Tianjin Port Development
SEHK: 3383 Agile Property
SEHK: 3388 Shenzhen Creality 3D Technology Co., Ltd.
SEHK: 3396 Legend Holdings
SEHK: 3398 China Ting Group Holdings Limited
SEHK: 3399 Guangdong Nan Yue Logistics Company Limited
SEHK: 3618 Chongqing Rural Commercial Bank
SEHK: 3625 Shanghai FourSemi Semiconductor Co., Ltd.
SEHK: 3636 Yunnan Jinxun Resources Co., Ltd.
SEHK: 3661 SG Micro Corp
SEHK: 3683 Great Harvest Maeta Group Holdings Ltd.
SEHK: 3688 Top Spring International Holdings Ltd.
SEHK: 3738 Vobile Group Limited
SEHK: 3752 ROKAE (SHANDONG) ROBOTICS GROUP INC.
SEHK: 3757 RoboTechnik Intelligent Technology Co., Ltd.
SEHK: 3774 Fameglow Holdings Ltd.
SEHK: 3788 China Hanking Holdings Ltd.
SEHK: 3800 GCL-Poly Energy Holdings Limited
SEHK: 3808 Sinotruk (Hong Kong) Limited
SEHK: 3813 Pou Sheng International
SEHK: 3818 China Dongxiang
SEHK: 3833 Xinjiang Xinxin Mining Industry Company
SEHK: 3838 China Starch Holdings Limited
SEHK: 3868 Qunxing Paper
SEHK: 3883 China Aoyuan Group Limited
SEHK: 3886 Town Health International
SEHK: 3888 Kingsoft
SEHK: 3889 Global Sweeteners
SEHK: 3898 Zhuzhou CRRC Times Electric Co., Ltd.
SEHK: 3899 Enric Energy Equipment Holdings Limited
SEHK: 3900 Greentown China
SEHK: 3918 NagaCorp Ltd.
SEHK: 3928 Zhengzhou Gas Co. Ltd.
SEHK: 3933 United Laboratories International Holdings Ltd.
SEHK: 3938 Samling Global Ltd.
SEHK: 3948 Yitai Coal Co.
SEHK: 3958 Orient Securities
SEHK: 3968 China Merchants Bank Co. Ltd.
SEHK: 3983 China BlueChemical
SEHK: 3986 GigaDevice Semiconductor Inc.
SEHK: 3988 Bank of China Limited
SEHK: 3989 Hembly International Holdings Limited
SEHK: 3993 China Molybdenum
SEHK: 3998 Bosideng
SEHK: 3999 Dachan Food (Asia)

== 4000–4999 ==
SEHK: 4607 China Cinda Asset Management (preference share)

== NASDAQ Shares ==
SEHK: 4332 Amgen Inc.
SEHK: 4333 Cisco Systems
SEHK: 4335 Intel Corporation
SEHK: 4336 Applied Materials, Inc.
SEHK: 4337 Starbucks Corporation
SEHK: 4338 Microsoft Corporation

== 6000 - 6199 ==
SEHK: 6030 CITIC Securities
SEHK: 6033 Telecom Digital Holdings Limited
SEHK: 6036 Apex Ace Holdings Limited
SEHK: 6038 G & M Holdings Limited
SEHK: 6049 Poly Property Development Co. Ltd
SEHK: 6051 Youzan Technology Ltd.
SEHK: 6060 ZhongAn Online P&C Insurance Co., Ltd.
SEHK: 6066 CSC Financial
SEHK: 6082 Shanghai Biren Technology Co., Ltd.
SEHK: 6106 Shanghai Seer Intelligent Technology Co., Ltd.
SEHK: 6132 HJ Science Co., Ltd.
SEHK: 6138 Harbin Bank
SEHK: 6193 Tailam Tech Construction Holdings Ltd
SEHK: 6199 ~~China CNR~~

== 6200 - 6800 ==
SEHK: 6228 PT Merdeka Gold Resources Tbk
SEHK: 6288 Fast Retailing Co., Ltd.
SEHK: 6636 Shandong Extreme Vision Technology Co., Ltd.
SEHK: 6656 Sigenergy Technology Co., Ltd.
SEHK: 6658 Liuliumei Co., Ltd.
SEHK: 6675 SENASIC Electronics Technology Co., Ltd.
SEHK: 6682 Phancy Group Co., Ltd.
SEHK: 6686 Noah Holdings Private Wealth and Asset Management Ltd.
SEHK: 6715 Hangzhou Qiandaohu Xunlong Sci-tech Co., Ltd.
SEHK: 6727 Transwarp Technology (Shanghai) Co., Ltd.
SEHK: 6731 Direct Drive Tech Limited
SEHK: 6745 Befar Group Co., Ltd

== 6800 - 6999 ==
SEHK: 6802 Shenzhen Camsense Technologies Co., Ltd.
SEHK: 6808 Sun Art Retail Group Limited
SEHK: 6809 Montage Technology Co., Ltd.
SEHK: 6810 Shanghai Sunmi Technology Co., Ltd.
SEHK: 6816 Prosper Construction Holdings Limited
SEHK: 6818 China Everbright Bank
SEHK: 6823 HKT Trust
SEHK: 6837 Haitong Securities
SEHK: 6862 Haidilao International Holding Ltd.
SEHK: 6865 Flat Glass Group
SEHK: 6871 ROBOTPHOENIX INTELLIGENT TECHNOLOGY CO., LTD.
SEHK: 6872 TenNor Therapeutics (Suzhou) Limited
SEHK: 6880 MOMENTA GLOBAL LIMITED
SEHK: 6881 China Galaxy Securities
SEHK: 6882 EGL Holdings Company Limited
SEHK: 6885 Henan Jinma Energy Company Limited
SEHK: 6886 Huatai Securities Co., Ltd.
SEHK: 6888 Freetech Road Recycling Technology (Holdings) Limited
SEHK: 6889 DYNAM JAPAN HOLDINGS Co., Ltd.
SEHK: 6908 HongGuang Lighting Holdings Co. Ltd.
SEHK: 6918 Kidztech Holdings Ltd.
SEHK: 6919 Renrui Human Resources Technology Holdings Ltd.
SEHK: 6928 TOMO Holdings Ltd.
SEHK: 6938 Suzhou Ribo Life Science Co., Ltd.
SEHK: 6966 China Wan Tong Yuan (Holdings) Ltd.

== 7400 – 7499 ==
SEHK: 7489 VOYAH AUTOMOTIVE TECHNOLOGY CO., LTD.

== 7600 – 7699 ==
SEHK: 7618 JINGDONG Industrials, Inc.
SEHK: 7630 IMPACT Therapeutics, Inc
SEHK: 7656 Reconova Technologies Co., Ltd.
SEHK: 7666 Metis TechBio Co., Ltd.
SEHK: 7687 EACON Group Co., Ltd
SEHK: 7688 Shanghai Top Numerical Control Technology Co., Ltd.

== 8000 – 8999 ==
SEHK: 8001 Orient Securities International Holdings Limited
SEHK: 8003 Great World Company Holdings Limited
SEHK: 8005 Yuxing Infotech Investment Holdings Limited
SEHK: 8006 Sino Splendid Holdings Limited
SEHK: 8007 Global Strategic Group Limited
SEHK: 8009 Chinese Energy Holdings Limited
SEHK: 8011 Polyard Petroleum International Group Limited
SEHK: 8013 ECI Technology Holdings Limited
SEHK: 8016 Changhong Jiahua Holdings Limited
SEHK: 8018 Finsoft Financial Investment Holdings Limited
SEHK: 8019 Hao Wen Holdings Limited
SEHK: 8075 Media Asia Group Holdings Limited
SEHK: 8080 North Asia Strategic Holdings Limited
SEHK: 8090 Shandong Baogai New Materials Technology Co., Ltd.
SEHK: 8095 Beida Jade Bird Universal Sci-Tech
SEHK: 8203 Kaisun Energy Group Limited
SEHK: 8262 Super Strong Holdings Limited
SEHK: 8270 China CMB Group Company Limited
SEHK: 8421 Winson Holdings Hong Kong Limited
SEHK: 8422 WT Group Holdings Ltd.
SEHK: 8423 Chi Ho Development Holdings Ltd.
SEHK: 8425 Hing Ming Holdings Ltd.
SEHK: 8426 Modern Living Investments Holdings Ltd.
SEHK: 8427 SK Target Group Ltd.
SEHK: 8428 CBK Holdings Ltd.
SEHK: 8429 Icicle Group Holdings Ltd.
SEHK: 8430 C&N Holdings Ltd.
SEHK: 8431 Hao Bai International (Cayman) Ltd.
SEHK: 8432 Bar Pacific Group Holdings Ltd.
SEHK: 8436 Takbo Group Holdings Ltd.
SEHK: 8437 RMH Holdings Ltd.
SEHK: 8439 Somerley Capital Holdings Ltd.
SEHK: 8441 IWS Group Holdings Ltd.
SEHK: 8445 Noble Engineering Group Holdings Ltd.
SEHK: 8446 In Technical Productions Holdings Ltd.
SEHK: 8447 MS Concept Ltd.
SEHK: 8448 Universe Printshop Holdings Ltd.
SEHK: 8450 EDICO Holdings Ltd.
SEHK: 8451 Sunlight (1977) Holdings Ltd.
SEHK: 8452 FY Financial (Shenzhen) Co., Ltd. - H Shares
SEHK: 8455 Lai Group Holding Co. Ltd.
SEHK: 8456 Mansion International Holdings Ltd.
SEHK: 8460 Basetrophy Group Holdings Ltd.
SEHK: 8462 Omnibridge Holdings Ltd.
SEHK: 8471 Reach New Holdings Ltd.
SEHK: 8472 Lapco Holdings Ltd.
SEHK: 8473 Mi Ming Mart Holdings Ltd.
SEHK: 8475 K Group Holdings Ltd.
SEHK: 8479 JTF International Holdings Ltd.
SEHK: 8480 Furniweb Holdings Ltd.
SEHK: 8481 Shenglong Splendecor International Ltd.
SEHK: 8482 Wan Leader International Ltd.
SEHK: 8483 Max Sight Group Holdings Ltd.
SEHK: 8485 Smart Globe Holdings Ltd.
SEHK: 8487 ISP Global Ltd.
SEHK: 8490 Niche-Tech Group Ltd.
SEHK: 8491 Cool Link (Holdings) Ltd.
SEHK: 8493 Dragon King Group Holdings Ltd.
SEHK: 8495 1957 & Co. (Hospitality) Ltd.
SEHK: 8500 Icon Culture Global Co. Ltd.
SEHK: 8501 Sanbase Corporation Ltd.
SEHK: 8502 Ocean Line Port Development Ltd.
SEHK: 8506 China Futex Holdings Ltd.
SEHK: 8507 i.century Holding Ltd.
SEHK: 8509 Wine's Link International Holdings Ltd.
SEHK: 8510 Top Standard Corporation
SEHK: 8511 Zhicheng Technology Group Ltd.
SEHK: 8512 Hyfusin Group Holdings Ltd.
SEHK: 8513 IAG Holdings Ltd.
SEHK: 8516 Grand Talents Group Holdings Ltd.
SEHK: 8519 Jia Group Holdings Ltd.
SEHK: 8521 ST International Holdings Co. Ltd.
SEHK: 8523 Sheung Moon Holdings Ltd.
SEHK: 8525 Byleasing Holdings Ltd.
SEHK: 8526 Wing Fung Group Asia Ltd.
SEHK: 8527 JLogo Holdings Ltd.
SEHK: 8532 Polyfair Holdings Ltd.
SEHK: 8535 Vistar Holdings Ltd.
SEHK: 8536 TL Natural Gas Holdings Ltd.
SEHK: 8537 Chong Fai Jewellery Group Holdings Co. Ltd.
SEHK: 8540 Victory Securities (Holdings) Co. Ltd.
SEHK: 8545 Amuse Group Holding Ltd.
SEHK: 8547 Pacific Legend Group Ltd.
SEHK: 8597 Capital Finance Holdings Ltd.
SEHK: 8598 Wan Cheng Metal Packaging Co. Ltd.
SEHK: 8601 Boltek Holdings Ltd.
SEHK: 8606 Kinetix Systems Holdings Ltd.
SEHK: 8607 Narnia (Hong Kong) Group Co. Ltd.
SEHK: 8609 Eggriculture Foods Ltd.
SEHK: 8610 BBSB International Limited
SEHK: 8611 Mindtell Technology Ltd.
SEHK: 8612 World Super Holdings Ltd.
SEHK: 8613 Oriental Payment Group Holdings Ltd.
SEHK: 8616 Sunray Engineering Group Ltd.
SEHK: 8617 Best Linking Group Holdings Ltd.
SEHK: 8619 WAC Holdings Ltd.
SEHK: 8620 Asia-express Logistics Holdings Ltd.
SEHK: 8621 Metropolis Capital Holdings Ltd.
SEHK: 8622 Huakang Biomedical Holdings Co. Ltd.
SEHK: 8627 Orange Tour Cultural Holding Ltd.
SEHK: 8631 Sun Kong Holdings Ltd.
SEHK: 8635 Novacon Technology Group Ltd.
SEHK: 8645 Nomad Technologies Holdings Ltd.
SEHK: 8646 China Hongguang Holdings Ltd.
SEHK: 8668 Ying Hai Group Holdings Co. Ltd.

== 9000 – 9999 ==
SEHK: 9611 Shanghai Longcheer Technology Co., Ltd.
SEHK: 9615 Mech-Mind Robotics Technologies Co., Ltd.
SEHK: 9621 RelyEZ Energy Storage Technology Co., Ltd.
SEHK: 9630 CIRCUIT FABOLOGY MICROELECTRONICS EQUIPMENT CO., LTD.
SEHK: 9660 Horizon Robotics
SEHK: 9856 Ligent Technologies, Inc.
SEHK: 9876 Ocean One Holding Ltd.
SEHK: 9893 Pizu Group Holdings Ltd.
SEHK: 9900 Gain Plus Holdings Ltd
SEHK: 9903 Shanghai Iluvatar CoreX Semiconductor Co., Ltd.
SEHK: 9909 Powerlong Commercial Management Holdings Ltd
SEHK: 9911 Newborn Town Inc
SEHK: 9916 Xingye Wulian Service Group Co Ltd
SEHK: 9918 Wise Ally International Holdings Ltd
SEHK: 9919 Activation Group Holdings Ltd
SEHK: 9922 Jiumaojiu International Holdings Ltd
SEHK: 9926 Akeso, Inc.
SEHK: 9928 Times Neighborhood Holdings Ltd
SEHK: 9929 Yaopop Holdings Ltd.
SEHK: 9933 GHW International
SEHK: 9936 Ximei Resources Holding Ltd
SEHK: 9938 Wah Wo Holdings Group Ltd
SEHK: 9963 Transtech Optelecom Science Holdings Ltd.
SEHK: 9966 Alphamab Oncology
SEHK: 9968 Huijing Holdings Co Ltd
SEHK: 9969 InnoCare Pharma Ltd
SEHK: 9971 BASiC Semiconductor Co., Ltd.
SEHK: 9976 Shenzhen Longsys Electronics Co., Ltd.
SEHK: 9980 Eastroc Beverage (Group) Co., Ltd.
SEHK: 9981 Shenzhen Woer Heat-Shrinkable Material Co., Ltd.
SEHK: 9988 Alibaba Group Holding Ltd
SEHK: 9998 Kwan Yong Holdings Ltd
