= Guo Wei (businessman, born 1963) =

Chinese politician and businessman

- 郭为
- Born: born in 1963; Hebei, China
- Education: University of Science and Technology of China; Northeastern University
- Occupations: Business magnate Investor; Philanthropist
- Known for: chairman of Digital China
- Title: 40 Years of Reform and Opening Up: Software Celebrities; Top 10 Leaders in China's Software and Information Services Industry; 50 Most Influential Business Leaders in China

Chinese name
- Simplified Chinese: 郭为
- Traditional Chinese: 郭為
Transcriptions
Standard Mandarin
- Hanyu Pinyin: guō wéi
- Tongyong Pinyin: guō wéi

Guo Wei (Chinese: 郭为; pinyin: guō wéi; born in Hebei Province in 1963) is a Chinese businessman. He currently serves as the chairman of Shenzhou Digital Group, Shenzhou Digital Information Service Group, and Board of Directors of Shenzhou Digital Holdings.

== Education ==
He holds a master's degree in management from the University of Science and Technology of China, and is a senior engineer.

== Career ==
Guo Wei joined the newly established Lenovo Group in 1988. He served in 11 positions over the course of 12 years at Lenovo. He held positions of general manager of public relations and business departments, and president of Lenovo digital China among others. He is regarded as one of the important personnel who contributed in Lenovo's success and started their own company afterwards.

After the spin-off of Lenovo Group in 2000, he led the Digital China team to embark on a second venture. Under him, after two decades later, Digital China has three listed companies: Digital China Holdings (SEHK: 861), Digital China Information (SZSE: 000555), and Digital China Group (SZSE: 000034). Their annual revenue exceeds RMB 140 billion, and they employ over 20,000 people.

== Publications ==
Time	Name	Author	Publisher
2025	The Power of Time	Guo Wei	LID Publishing Group
2024	The Power of Datafication	Guo Wei	LID Publishing Group
2023	The Power of Time (Chinese Version)	Guo Wei	Enterprise Management Publishing House
2022	The Power of Datafication (Chinese Version)	Guo Wei	China Machine Press
