= Greenheart =

Greenheart or greenhart may refer to:

Company

- Greenheart Group, an international forestry company listed on the Hong Kong Stock Exchange

Plants

- Chlorocardium rodiei (family Lauraceae), a tree native to Guyana in northern South America
- Colubrina arborescens (family Rhamnaceae), a shrub native to Florida and the Caribbean
- Lignum vitae, the heartwood of a tree of the genus Guaiacum
- Warburgia ugandensis, also known as Uganda greenheart
- Intsia bijuga, also known as Borneo teak

Other uses

- Groene Hart (English: Green Heart), a region of Holland
- Greenheart phones, a range of cell phones by Sony Ericsson
- Styria, Austrian state nicknamed "the green heart of Austria"
- Thuringia, German state nicknamed "the green heart of Germany"
- Umbria, Italian region nicknamed "the green heart of Italy"
