= Fufeng (disambiguation) =

Fufeng (扶风县) is a county in Shaanxi, China

Fufeng may also refer to:

- Fufeng (region) (扶風), a historical region in modern Shaanxi, China
- Fufeng Group (阜丰集团), monosodium glutamate and xanthan gum producer in China
- Fufeng, Qimen County (凫峰镇), town in Qimen County, Anhui, China
