= Tiangong =

Tiangong may refer to:

== Space station ==
- The Tiangong space station (Chinese large modular space station), a Chinese space station launched in modules in the 2020s
- Smaller space stations for testing:
  - Tiangong-1 (2011)
  - Tiangong-2 (2016)
  - Tiangong-3, cancelled
- Tiangong program, an overview of the Chinese space station program as a whole

== Others ==
- Shijiazhuang Tiangong, football (soccer) club for Shijiazhuang, Hebei
- Tiangong Kaiwu, encyclopedia written by Song Yingxing
- Tiangong University, formerly known as Tianjin Polytechnic University, in Tianjin, China
- Tiangongyuan Subdistrict, Subdistrict in Daxing District, Beijing, China
  - Tiangong Yuan station, subway station in Tiangongyuan Subdistrict, Daxing District, Beijing, China
- Jade Emperor, also known as Tian Gong, the name of Taoist deity, the Ruler of Heaven
- Sky Bow, Romanized as Tiengong or Tiangong, Taiwanese surface-to-air missiles
- Tiangong International, steel company
- Tiangong Kaiwu, encyclopedia written by Song Yingxing
- Tiangong University, formerly known as Tianjin Polytechnic University, in Tianjin, China
- Humanoid Robot, a full-sized, open-source humanoid robot
