= Chen Jianqiang =

Chinese businessperson

- Education: M.B.A
- Alma mater: China Europe International Business School.
- Occupation: Businessperson
- Known for: Chairman of Springland International

Chen Jianqiang (Chinese: 陈建强) is a Chinese entrepreneur, the founder and chairman of Springland International. According to Hurun Report's China Rich List 2013, he was the 401st richest person in China, with a net worth of $780 million.

== Background ==
Chen obtained his MBA from China Europe International Business School.

== Business ==
Chen is the founder of Springland International, which operates supermarkets and department stores in China. The company went public in October 2010.

== Inclusion in Forbes list ==
As per Forbes, Chen's wealth was calculated based on public reports filed with the Hong Kong Stock Exchange, but Chen's attorney objected to Chen's inclusion in the Forbes list.

== See also ==
- List of Chinese by net worth
