= Zhaojin Mining =

Chinese gold mining enterprise

Zhaojin Mining Industry Company Limited
- Native name: 招金矿业股份有限公司
- Romanized name: zhāo jīn kuàngyè gǔfèn yǒuxiàn gōngsī
- Company type: Public
- Industry: Gold mining
- Founded: 2004
- Headquarters: Zhaoyuan, Shandong, People's Republic of China
- Area served: People's Republic of China
- Key people: Chairman: Mr. Lu Dongshang
- Products: Gold, Silver, Copper, other precious metals
- Revenue: RMB 13.2 billion (2023)
- Operating income: RMB 2.8 billion (2023)
- Net income: RMB 1.05 billion (2023)
- Number of employees: approx. 8,000 (2023)
- Parent: Zhaojin Group
- Website: Zhaojin Mining Industry Company Limited

Zhaojin Mining Industry Company Limited (SEHK: 1818) is a leading gold mining enterprise in China, primarily engaged in gold exploration, mining, processing, refining, and related smelting activities. The company is a joint venture between Zhaojin Group and Fosun International, and is headquartered in Zhaoyuan, Shandong Province.

== Corporate Affairs ==
Fosun International, a major diversified investment conglomerate based in Shanghai, is a significant shareholder in Zhaojin Mining. Fosun holds a strategic minority interest in the company through its subsidiary Fortune Asset Management Ltd.

Its H share IPO was listed on the Hong Kong Stock Exchange on 6 December 2006.

== Operations ==
Zhaojin Mining operates an extensive network of gold mines and smelting facilities, with its primary operations concentrated in Shandong Province, particularly in the city of Zhaoyuan, known as "China's Gold Capital." Over the years, the company has expanded its mining footprint to other resource-rich regions in Gansu, Xinjiang, Inner Mongolia, and Heilongjiang, making it one of the most geographically diversified gold producers in China.

The company's core asset is the Zhaoyuan Gold Mine Cluster in Shandong, which consists of several high-grade underground gold mines and serves as the hub for processing and refining activities. Among its key Shandong operations is the Dayingezhuang Gold Mine, noted for its consistent high recovery rates and advanced underground mining technology.

In Gansu, Zhaojin Mining operates the Zaozigou Gold Mine, a major contributor to the companys overall gold output, producing approximately 207,101 ounces of gold in 2020.

In recent years, Zhaojin has expanded internationally. In 2024, the company acquired a controlling interest in Tietto Minerals, an Australian-listed gold company, for approximately A$733 million. Through this acquisition, Zhaojin gained an 88% stake in the Abujar Gold Project located in Côte d'Ivoire, West Africa. The Abujar mine began commercial production in early 2023 and is expected to produce an average of 170,000 ounces of gold annually over the next nine years.

Zhaojin also operates refining and smelting facilities that produce high-purity gold ingots for both domestic and export markets. As of 2023, the company's total gold reserves and resources exceeded 900 tonnes, with annual production reaching approximately 35 tonnes of gold.

== See also ==
- Gold mining in China
- List of companies listed on the Hong Kong Stock Exchange
