= GZI Transport =

Chinese transport company

GZI Transport Limited 越秀交通有限公司
- Company type: State-owned enterprise (Red chip)
- Industry: Toll roads
- Founded: 1997
- Headquarters: Hong Kong Island, Hong Kong
- Area served: People's Republic of China
- Key people: Chairman: Mr. Ou Bingchang
- Parent: Guangzhou Investment
- Website: GZI Transport Limited

GZI Transport Limited (SEHK: 1052) is a transport company engaged in the management of toll roads of expressways and national highways in Guangdong, China.

Its parent company is Guangzhou Investment Company. It is headquartered in Hong Kong and listed on the Hong Kong Stock Exchange as red chip stock in 1997.
