= Coastal Greenland =

Property developer in Mainland China

Coastal Greenland Limited 沿海绿色家园有限公司
- Company type: Privately held company
- Traded as: SEHK: 1124
- Industry: Real estate
- Founded: 1990
- Founder: Mr. Jiang Ming
- Headquarters: Hong Kong, People's Republic of China
- Area served: People's Republic of China
- Key people: Chairman: Mr. Chan Boon Teong Managing director: Mr. Jiang Ming
- Website: Coastal Greenland Limited

Coastal Greenland Limited is a property developer in mainland China. It is focused on the property development mainly in major cities of six major economic regions in China, namely Northeastern Region, Northern Region, Central Region, Eastern Region, Southern Region and Southwestern Region. It was established in 1990 and is headquartered in Hong Kong and was listed on the Hong Kong Stock Exchange in 1997.
