= China BlueChemical =

Chinese chemical company

China BlueChemical Limited 中海石油化學股份有限公司
- Company type: State-owned enterprise
- Industry: Nitrogenous fertilizer manufacturing and sales
- Founded: 2006
- Headquarters: Dongfang, Hainan, People's Republic of China
- Area served: People's Republic of China
- Key people: Chairman: Mr. Wu Mengfei
- Parent: CNOOC
- Website: China BlueChemical Limited

China BlueChemical Limited or China BlueChemical (SEHK: 3983) is the largest nitrogenous fertilizer manufacturer in mainland China by production volume and energy efficiency, engaging in processing of natural gas for production of chemical fertilizers and other chemical products. It is headquartered in Dongfang, Hainan. Its parent company is CNOOC, the third largest petroleum state-owned enterprise in mainland China.

Its H shares were listed on the Hong Kong Stock Exchange on 29 September 2006.
