= Liu Chong Hing Investment =

Hong Kong incorporated-listed company

Liu Chong Hing Investment Limited (Chinese: 廖創興企業有限公司) SEHK: 194 is a Hong Kong incorporated-listed company founded in 1970. Its main business was originally on residential and commercial property developments in Hong Kong and China.

It became a public listed company in 1972 in Hong Kong and later expanded its business into investment holding, property management, hotel management, warehouses investment, treasury investment, trading and manufacturing.

== Major investment ==
In 2003, the company started to develop property project in China by building an office tower in Shanghai. The property was at Nanjing West Road and was expecting to complete within 2 years. Once completed, it was expected to be held for long term lease. The office tower was finally opened in 2007 and named Chong Hing Finance Centre, located in the Puxi core CBD Nanjing West Road in Huangpu District. The building is close to People's Square and about 3 minutes' walk to metro lines 1, 2, and 8 at People Square Station.

=== Budget Hotel Project ===
Since 2008, the company started its budget hotel business in Shanghai, Beijing and Guangzhou. These budget hotels are managed and operated under the brand of Hanting. Due to the restructuring of the business strategy, the Group had sold the budgeted hotels at Shanghai and Beijing in 2016, with the hotel in Guangzhou remains in operation.

== Hang Seng Composite Index ==
The company was removed from Hang Seng Composite Index in March 2018.
