= Tunbow =

Manufacturer of household appliances

- Native name: 東保利電業（惠州）有限公司
- Type: Subsidiary
- Traded as: SEHK: 1692
- Industry: Household appliances
- Founded: 1995; 31 years ago in Hong Kong
- Founder: Charles Chan
- Headquarters: Hong Kong
- Parent: Town Ray Holdings Limited

Tunbow Group Ltd., established in 1995 by Charles Chan and his wife, is a prominent Hong Kong-based original equipment manufacturer (OEM) specializing in electrothermic household appliances. The company integrates design, product development, research and development, and production quality management to deliver a diverse range of products.

Tunbow's product line primarily focuses garment care appliances like steam generator irons, garment steamers, and steam irons and cooking appliances, which include coffee machines, steam cooking appliances.

The company is recognized as one of the world's top five OEM for electric irons, earning the moniker "King of Irons."

Tunbow exports a significant portion of its products to Europe. The company has established production facilities in India. Its main factory is located in Huizhou, China.

== Clientele ==
Tunbow serves as an OEM for various home appliance brands, including Beaba, Beko, Sencor, Severin, Grundig, Tchibo, Klarstein, Smeg, Philips and Espressione.

== Structure ==
Tunbow Group is a subsidiary of Town Ray’s Holdings Limited, a company listed on the Main Board of the Stock Exchange of Hong Kong (Stock Code: 1692).
