= Shandong Molong Petroleum Machinery =

Chinese petroleum machinery manufacturer

Shandong Molong Petroleum Machinery Company Limited 山東墨龍石油機械股份有限公司
- Type: Private
- Traded as: SEHK: 568
- Industry: Petroleum, machinery
- Founded: 1987; 39 years ago
- Founder: Mr. Zhang En-rong
- Headquarters: Shouguang, Shandong, China
- Area served: China
- Key people: Mr. Zhang En-rong (chairman)
- Website: www.molonggroup.com/en/index.asp

Shandong Molong Petroleum Machinery Company Limited or Shandong Molong, is a private petroleum machinery manufacturer in Shouguang, Shandong, China. It offers oil well pump, sucker rods, oil well pipes and other oil drilling and oil extraction machinery products. Petrochina and Sinopec are its major customers.

== History ==
- 1987: It was founded by Mr. Zhang En-rong in a name of Shouguang Petroleum Machinery Accessories Company Limited.
- 1989: Its name changed to Shouguang Petroleum Machinery Company Limited.
- 1994: Shandong Molong Petroleum Machinery Company Limited was established.
- 2006: It was listed on the Growth Enterprise Market of the Hong Kong Stock Exchange (SEHK: 8261).
- 2007: It was listed on the Main Board of the Hong Kong Stock Exchange. (SEHK: 568)

== Link ==
- Shandong Molong Petroleum Machinery Company Limited
