= Neo-Neon Holdings =

Hong Kong lighting products company

Neo-Neon Holdings Limited 同方友友控股有限公司
- Type: Privately owned company
- Industry: Decorative lighting
- Founded: 1979
- Headquarters: Hong Kong, People's Republic of China
- Area served: People's Republic of China
- Key people: Lu Zhi Cheng; Chairman; Ben Fan; CEO
- Website: Neo-Neon Holdings Limited (English); Neo-Neon Holdings Limited (Chinese); Neo-Neon Holdings Limited (Chinese)

Neo-Neon Holdings Limited (SEHK: 1868) is a decorative lighting company stationed in Hong Kong. It engages in the research, development, manufacturing and distribution of lighting products including incandescent, LED, decorative and entertainment lighting products.

== History ==
- 1979: Neo-Neon was founded in Taiwan by Mr. Ben Fan.
- 1989: It moved its production force to Heshan, Guangdong in Mainland China.
- 1996: It began investing in R&D for decorative lights.
- 2002: It achieved mass production of LED decorative lights.
- 2006: Its products expanded to commercial lighting products which include high-intensity discharge lamps, and compact fluorescent, RGB LED, amber white blue and white LED technologies. It was listed on the Hong Kong Stock Exchange with an IPO price of HK$6.9 per share.
