= China Zirconium Limited =

China Zirconium Limited (China Zirconium) (HKG:0395) is engaged in the research, development, manufacturing, and sale of a range of zirconium chemicals, electronic materials (with zirconium), electronic ceramics, alternative energy materials, and rechargeable batteries. Its new energy materials products, including nickel hydroxide and hydrogen-storage alloy powder, are electrode materials for nickel metal hydride (NiMH), and nickel cadmium and lithium ion batteries (NiCd) batteries. As of 2009, China Zirconium Limited had an annual production capacity of over 40,000 tons of various types of zirconium chemicals and 1,500 tons of new energy materials. Its products are offered under the Long Jing trademark in the People's Republic of China, Japan, United States, and Hong Kong. Its business segments include zirconium compounds, electronic materials and electronic ceramics, new energy materials, and rechargeable batteries.

China Zirconium was listed on the Hong Kong Stock Exchange on 28 October 2002. It started its operations in 1977 and is based in Yixing, Wuxi, Jiangsu Province. In 2001, it was ranked as the largest zirconium chemicals exporter in the PRC.
