= Springland =

Chinese retail company

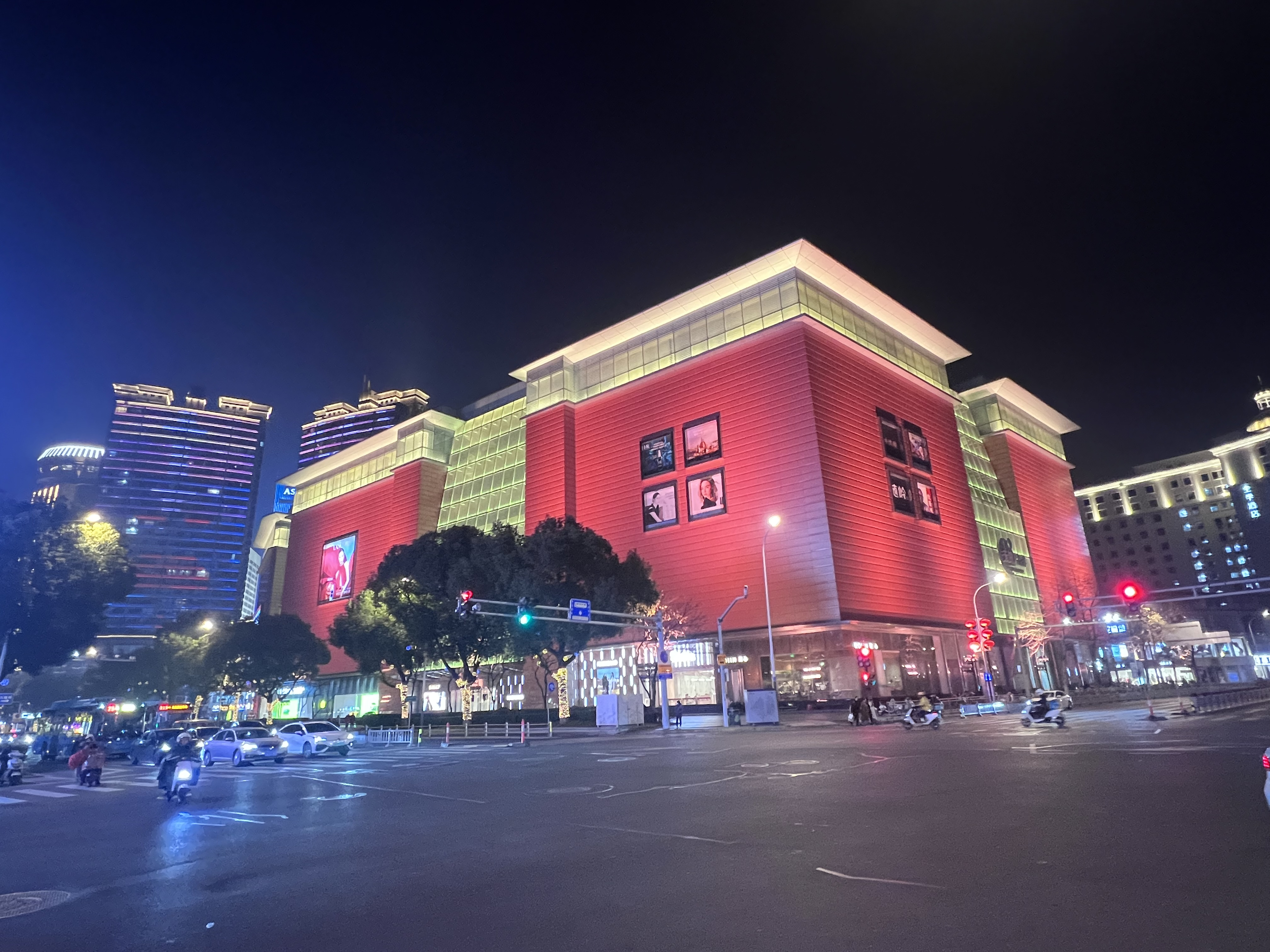
- Company type: Publicly Traded
- Traded as: SEHK: 1700.
- Industry: Retail
- Founded: January 1, 1996
- Founder: Chen Jianqiang
- Headquarters: Wuxi, China
- Number of locations: 6
- Area served: China
- Key people: Chen Jianqiang (Executive Director); Tao Qingrong (CEO & Executive Director); Fung Hiu Lai (Executive Director & VP); Wang Lin (Non-Executive Director); Fung Hiu Chuen (Non-Executive Director)
- Services: Department stores and Supermarkets.
- Revenue: ▲¥8696.80 million (2011)
- Owner: Chen Jianqiang
- Subsidiaries: YAOHAN; SPRINGLAND; T&T Supermarket (Datonghua)
- Website: www.springlandgroup.com.cn

Springland International Holdings Ltd (simplified Chinese: 华地国际; traditional Chinese: 華地國際; pinyin: huá dì guó jì) is a Chinese retail company traded on the Hong Kong Stock Exchange. Springland International is predominantly a retail chain operator in the Yangtze River Delta. It operates department stores and supermarkets.

Springland International is also the holding company of YAOHAN, SPRINGLAND & T&T Supermarket (Datonghua).

== Background & IPO ==
Springland was founded in 1996 in Yixing, Jiangsu by Chen Jianqiang. In 2011, Chen was included in the Forbes list of richest people. This was shortly after his company was listed on the Hong Kong Stock Exchange in October 2010. IPO was floated with aim to raise $478 million by selling 625 million shares (price range HKD 4.85 to HKD 5.93 each). Of the offering, 80% were new shares and the rest were secondary shares. Morgan Stanley handled the IPO of Springland International.

== Department stores ==
Company focused on developing business in the Greater Yangtze River Delta and (as at 30 June 2010), the company was operating 10 department stores and 16 supermarkets there. It has stores in;

- Yixing
- Jiangyin
- Liyang
- Danyang
- Changshu
- Jintan

Springland International's department stores offer primarily following categories of merchandise;

- Fashion & apparel
- Cosmetics
- Jewellery & accessories
- Footwear
- Athletic apparel & casual wear
- Children wear & home furnishing
- Household & electronic appliances
- Others

== Supermarkets ==
Springland International's supermarket offers food, and non-food merchandise. Most of the supermarkets are located in cities in the Greater Yangtze River Delta.

== Branding ==
=== Department store ===
Springland International operates its department stores (other than department stores in Wuxi, Ma’anshan, Nantong & Zhenjiang), under the trade name of Springland (Chinese: 華地). In Wuxi, Ma’anshan, Nantong & Zhenjiang, the department stores are operated under trade name of Yaohan (Chinese: 八佰伴).

=== Supermarket ===
Springland International operates its supermarket business under the trade name of Datonghua (Chinese: 大統華).
