= Kai Yuan Holdings Limited =

Chinese energy and heating company

- Company type: Investment holding company
- Headquarters: Hong Kong

Kai Yuan Holdings Limited (開源控股有限公司) is an investment holding company, engaged in the production and supply of heat energy in the People's Republic of China. The company also involves in the engineering and maintenance of heating systems and management of heating pipes. In addition, it engages in property investments in the People's Republic of China and Hong Kong. The company was formerly known as Guo Xin Group Limited. Kai Yuan Holdings Limited is based in Admiralty, Hong Kong.

The Company's subsidiaries include Ample Land International Limited, Burlingame (Chinese) Investment Limited, Beijing Boya Property Management Company Limited, External Fame Limited, Omnigold Resources Limited, Tianjin Heating Development Company Limited and Tianjin Boasheng Heating Investment Company Ltd. On June 30, 2008, the Company completed the acquisition of 49% interest in Heating Development Co., Ltd.

In June 2014, Kai Yuan Holdings announced it would acquire Marriott Hotel Champs-Elysées in Paris.
