= U-Right =

Hong Kongese garment distributor (1983–2008)

U-Right International Holdings Limited 佑威國際控股有限公司
- Company type: Listed company
- Industry: Fashion retailing
- Founded: 1983
- Founder: Mr. Leung Ngok
- Defunct: 2008
- Headquarters: Hong Kong
- Area served: Mainland China; Hong Kong; Saudi Arabia
- Key people: Former chairman: Mr. Leung Ngok
- Number of employees: 400 (2008)
- Website: Provisional Liquidators of U-Right International Holdings Limited

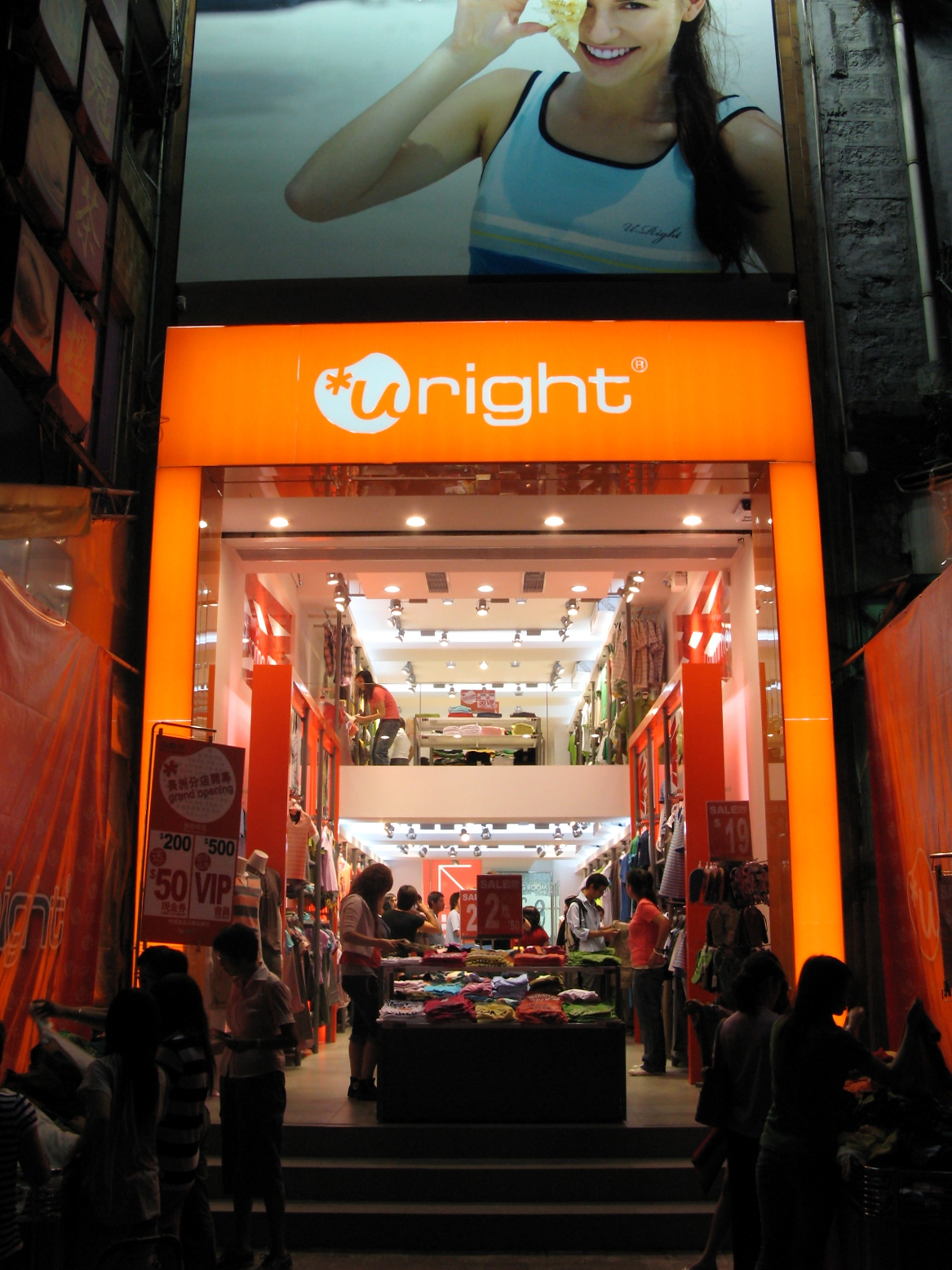
Former U-Right outlet in Cheung Chau

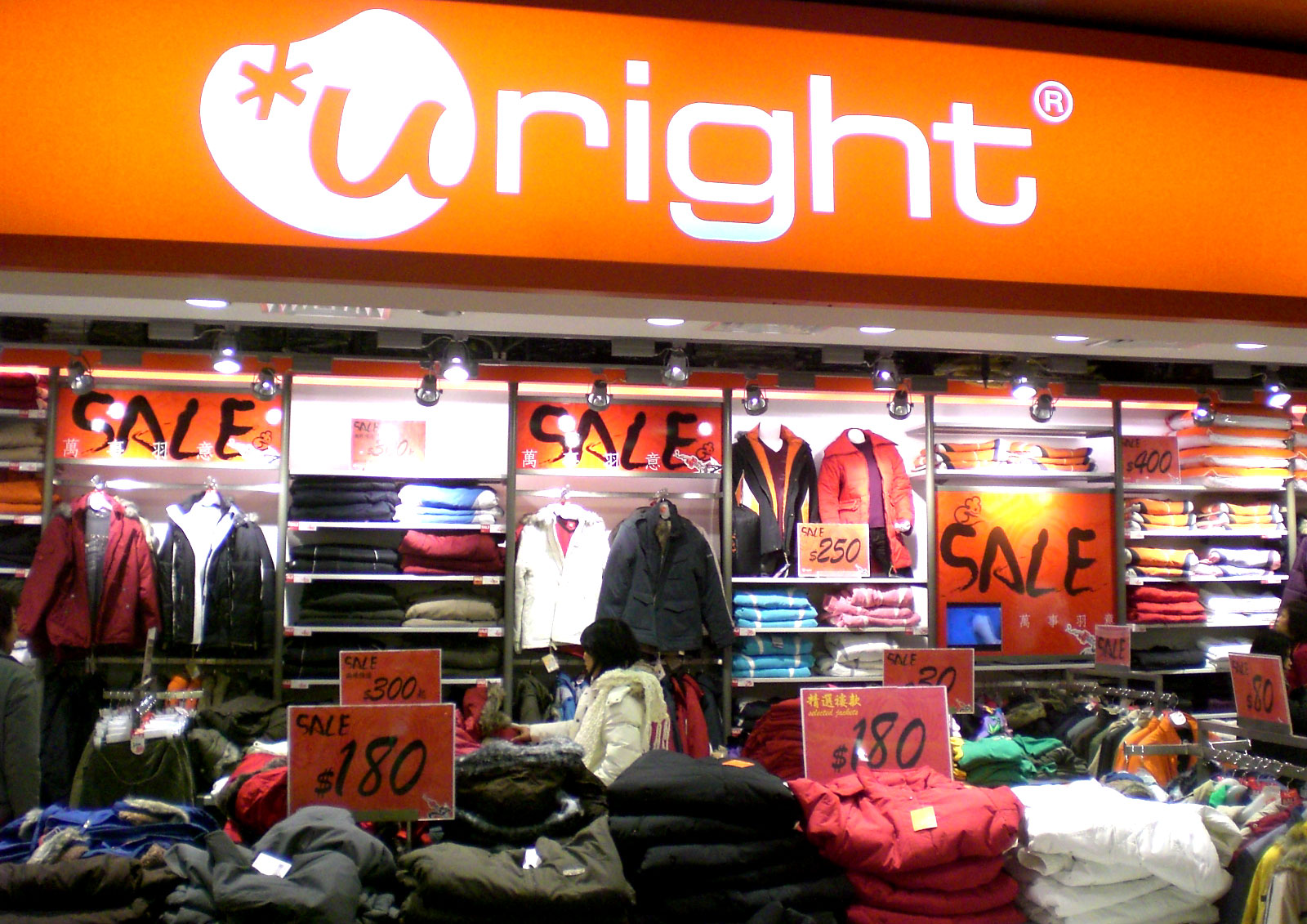
Former U-Right outlet in Shun Tak Centre, Sheung Wan

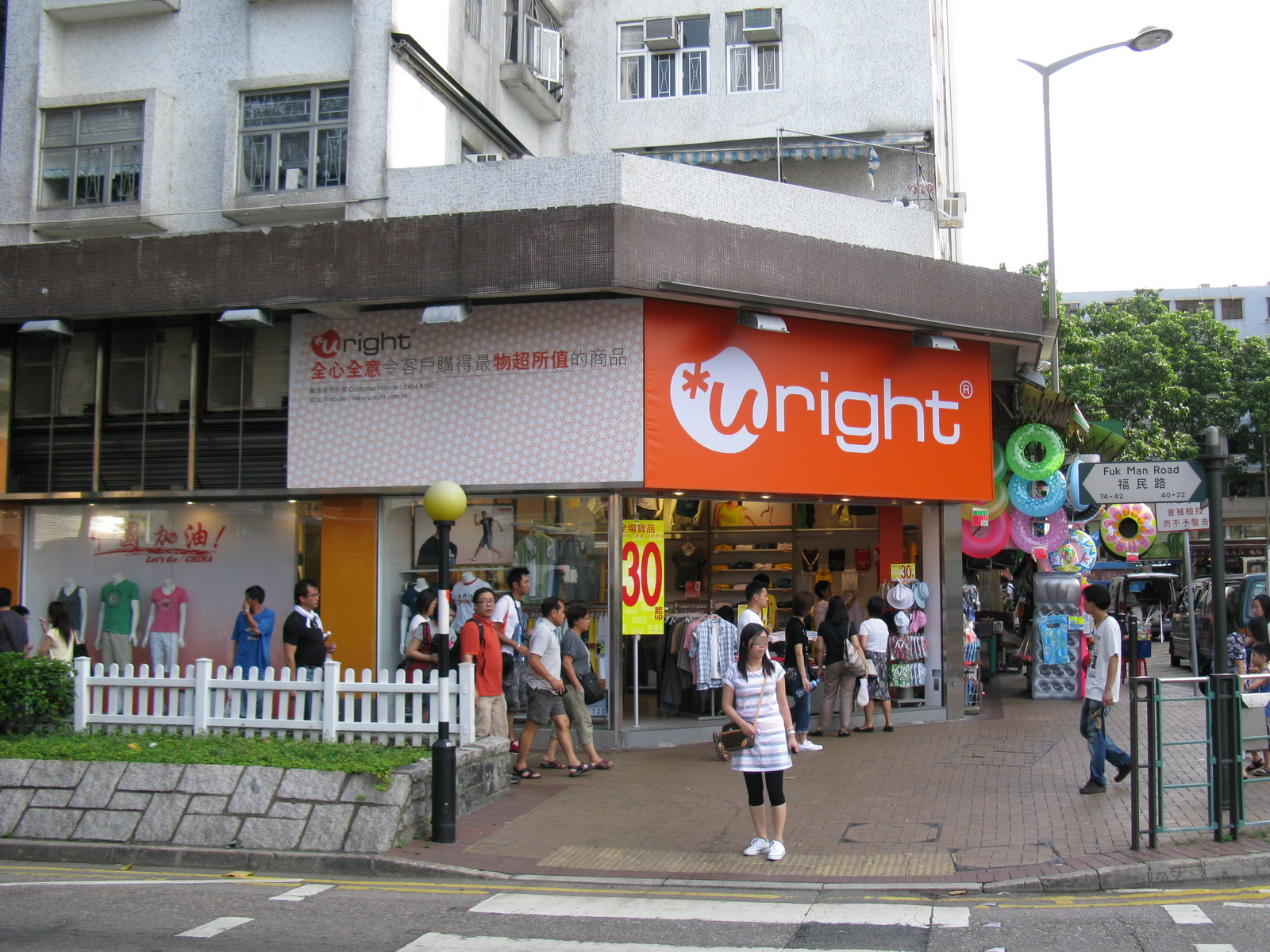
Former U-Right outlet in Sai Kung

U-Right International Holdings Limited (Chinese: 佑威國際控股有限公司) (SEHK: 627), or U-Right (Chinese: 佑威), was a garment distributor and retailer headquartered in Hong Kong. It offered men's and ladies' casual wear under the brand name of U-Right through retail outlets and distribution points. It utilized and licensed the Swedish Texcote technology, which is a material processing technology based on the principles of nano-technology. It also had its own production base in Shunde and Shenzhen of Guangdong to develop its nano-technology products.

== History ==
U-Right was founded by Mr. Leung Ngok in Hong Kong in 1983 and Mr. Leung served as the company chairman until 2008.

U-Right had acquired the Texcote Technology from Swedish scientists. This specific textile was water repellent, dirt resistant and carried environmental properties. Its subsidiary U-Right Nano Textile (China) Ltd. produced Texcote-built products for other clothing companies. U-Right launched Texcote-based products in 2002. Nano-coating clothes only increased production cost by 3%, yet the profit margin of nano-coated products was 50% higher. In 2003, the company announced exceptional results thanks to its nano-coated solutions and invested $50 million in a new nano-technology plant in mainland China to accelerate its Texcote-based production. In 2006, the company announced it could nano-coat a million items a month thanks to its increased production capacity.

From 2005 to 2007, in Hong Kong alone, the company store count went from 18 to 65. In mainland China, in 2007, U-Right owned 40 stores and 360 franchise stores. U-Right launched the stores Sevendays which carry top-tier fashion products (4 stores in 2007), and the high-end fashion brand Pezzx (2 stores in 2007). In 2007, U-Right started to sell brands others than their homemade brands.

In 2008, U-Right was liquidated by Deutsche Bank, its creditor, as HK$1.3 billion debts was disabled to pay back. And provisional liquidator took over U-Right. Retail stores were closed down and 160 employees were laid off. Mr. Leung, U-Right's former chairman, was also declared bankrupt by the Hong Kong High Court. Its shares still suspended trading until further notice.
