= China Sandi Holdings =

Chinese ecological forestry company

China Sandi Holdings Limited 中國三迪控股有限公司
- Company type: Public (SEHK: 910)
- Industry: Forestry
- Founded: 1991
- Headquarters: Hong Kong, People's Republic of China
- Area served: Mainland China
- Key people: Chairman: Mr. Chi Chi Hung, Kenneth
- Website: chinasandi.com.hk

China Sandi Holdings Limited (Short name, China Sandi Holdings), formerly China Grand Forestry Resources Group Limited and China Grand Forestry Green Resources Group Limited, is a public company engaged in the ecological forestry business in China. It is involved in tree plantation and the manufacture and distribution of timber.

It was established in 1991 with the origin name of Good Fellow Group Limited. It was listed on the Hong Kong Stock Exchange in 1998. It is headquartered in Hong Kong.
