= China Properties Group =

Chinese private property developer

China Properties Group Limited
- Company type: Privately held company
- Industry: Real estate
- Founder: Mr. Wang Shizhong
- Headquarters: Hong Kong Special Administrative Region
- Area served: China
- Key people: Chairman: Mr. Wang Shizhong
- Website: China Properties Group Limited

China Properties Group Limited or China Properties (SEHK: 1838) is a private property developer focusing on developing large-scale residential and commercial projects in major cities in China including Shanghai, Beijing and Kunshan. Its chairman is Mr. Wang Shizhong.

It was listed on the Hong Kong Stock Exchange in 2007.

== See also ==
- Real estate in China
