= Shandong Hi-Speed New Energy Group =

Shandong Hi-Speed New Energy Group Ltd (SHNE) is a Hong Kong–based company with interests in renewable energy and related industries. It was established in 2000 as Jin Cai Holdings Co., was incorporated in the Cayman Islands then listed on the Hong Kong Stock Exchange. The company was incorporated in November 2012, appeared in the Paradise Papers leak in 2014 and changed its name to Beijing Enterprises Clean Energy Group in 2015. The change to its current name was made in August 2022.

== Projects ==
In December 2018, it was announced that the company intends to develop a A$145-million facility in Whyalla in South Australia, incorporating PV solar energy generation and intensive horticulture. According to the Whyalla City Council, the company's projects elsewhere include solar farms, wind farms, battery storage systems, clean heating supply services, geothermal power systems, and micro-grid network technologies.

== Ownership ==
SHNE's majority shareholder is Profit Plan Global Investment Ltd., which holds roughly 43.45% of Class-H shares. Along with its subsidiaries, the company provides water services in mainland China, Singapore, Malaysia and Portugal. The company has three main segments: Centralized Photovoltaics, Wind Power, and Distributed Photovoltaics. The group's consolidated power generation reached 6.5 billion kWh as of December 31, 2024.

The company was incorporated in Hong Kong and has its headquarters in Wan Chai. Prior to 2008, the company was named Shang Hua Holdings Ltd. It was incorporated in 1992.

At 2016, the company's CEO and Executive Director is Mr Min Zhou and Mr Li Li is COO, EVP and Executive Director.

From August 2022, the company website is www.shneg.com.hk.
