= Luoyang Glass =

Chinese glassmaker

Luoyang Glass Company Limited 洛陽玻璃股份有限公司
- Company type: State-owned enterprise
- Industry: Glass manufacturing
- Founded: 1994
- Headquarters: Luoyang, Henan, People's Republic of China
- Area served: People's Republic of China
- Key people: Chairman: Mr. Gao Tianbao; General manager: Mr. Cao Mingchun
- Products: Glass
- Parent: China Luoyang Float Glass Group Company Limited
- Website: www.zhglb.com

Luoyang Glass Company Limited or Luoyang Glass (SEHK: 1108, SSE: 600876) is a state-owned enterprise in Luoyang, Henan, China, which is involved with the production and sales of float sheet and flat glass and reprocessing of automobile glass.

== History ==
Luoyang Glass was established in 1994 by its parent company, China Luoyang Float Glass Group. Its H shares were listed on the Hong Kong Stock Exchange in 1994, while its A shares were listed on the Shanghai Stock Exchange in 1995.
