= Sea Holdings =

Hong Kong property developer

S E A Holdings Limited
- Type: Public
- Traded as: SEHK: 251
- Industry: Property
- Founded: 1956
- Founder: Lu Chu-mang
- Headquarters: 26th Floor, Everbright Centre, 108 Gloucester Road, Wanchai, Hong Kong
Key people
Lu Wing-Chi, Lambert Lu
- Website: www.seagroup.com.hk

S E A Group, (SEA Holdings Limited; HKEX: 0251), founded in 1956, is one of Hong Kong’s longest-established property developers. Several of its subsidiaries have been listed in the United Kingdom, Australia, and New Zealand. With more than 200 projects, its business footprint spans the globe, making it a diversified multinational real estate enterprise.

It was once the largest commercial landlord in Australia and New Zealand. Other milestones include the record-breaking HKD 10 billion sale of 108 Gloucester Road in Wan Chai (formerly "Dah Sing Financial Centre") to China Everbright Group, and forming a consortium to acquired the Grand Victoria site in West Kowloon from the government for HK$17.3 billion.

== History ==
SEA Group acquired the waterfront residential site at South Bay Road, Repulse Bay for HK$1.188 billion.

== Existing and past development ==
The Group has invested and developed over 200 residential, commercial and industrial projects in China, Hong Kong, United Kingdom, Canada, Australia, New Zealand, Japan, Indonesia and other countries. Notable projects include:

Location	Type	Development
Hong Kong	Residential (Ard 50 projects)	Proposed Waterfront Residential Development at NKIL 6549, West Kowloon^, No.1 Shouson Hill Road East^ Hilltop Villa, 59 Mount Kellett, 44 Stubbs Road, Amber Garden, Greenville Gardens, Gardenview Heights, Wiltshire Villa, Lu's Garden, Moonbeam Terrace, Royal Green, The Morrison and The Forest Hills, etc.
Hong Kong	Office	Wan Chai:108 Gloucester Road (Now known as Everbright Centre), 80 Gloucester Road, China Underwriters Centre (Now known as 88 Gloucester Road, Wan Chai), Central: Wellington Place and Chinese Bank Building, etc.
Hong Kong	Hotel	Crowne Plaza Hong Kong Causeway Bay^, Metro Hotel (Now known as Wharney Guang Dong Hotel)
United Kingdom	Office	20 Moorgate, London^, 33 Old Broad Street, London^, John Sinclair House, Edinburgh^
China	Residential	Guangzhou Westmin Plaza and Guangzhou Lloyds Building
China	Mixed-use project	Kaifeng Nova City, Chengdu Longquan Project, etc.
China	Office	Chengdu Plaza Central, Chengdu New Century Plaza and Office Section – Guangzhou Westmin Plaza
Australia	Office	Sydney: 2 Barrack Street, 24 York Street, 363 George Street, 70 King Street, Antanaskovic Hartnell House Melbourne: 601 Bourke Street and many others up to more than 10 office buildings.
Australia	Hotel	Queensland Lizard Island Resort^
New Zealand	Residential	Auckland: 180 Symonds Street, 28 Shortland Street, North Shore Club Wellington: Terrace Chambers and many other residential projects.
New Zealand	Office (Ard 70 projects)	Auckland: Citibank Centre, 105 Queen Street, 115 Queen Street, 132 Halsey Street, 355 Great South Road, Auckland Club Tower Wellington: 85 The Terrace, Axon House, Barclays House, Hitachi Data Systems House, National Insurance Building, etc.
New Zealand	Hotel	Christchurch Clearwater Resort
Japan	Office	Shinjuku Seishin Building
Canada	Residential	Vancouver Discovery Apartment
Indonesia	Residential	Jakarta The Discovery

^Existing Development

== Shareholders ==
The controlling shareholder of the listed company is the Lu (Chinese: 呂) family. In 2018, it was reported that the Lu family had restructured the group structure by changing the parent companies of the listed company. After the restructuring, 51.23% of the shares of the listed company were still owned by Nan Luen International Limited, a private company owned by the Executive Chairman of S E A Holdings, Lu Wing-chi (Chinese: 呂榮梓), and the CEO, Lambert Lu (呂聯樸). As of 2018, Lu Wing-chi also individually owned an additional 11.33% of the shares of the listed company. Lu Wing-chi is the father of Lambert Lu.
