= Maoye International =

Chinese retail company

Maoye International Holdings Limited 茂业国际控股有限公司
- Company type: Privately held company
- Industry: Department store
- Founded: 1996
- Headquarters: Shenzhen, Guangdong, People's Republic of China
- Area served: China
- Key people: Chairman: Mr. Huang Maoru
- Website: Maoye International Holdings Limited

Maoye International Holdings Limited (SEHK: 848), or Maoye International, Maoye, is the top-rank leading department store in Shenzhen, Guangdong, China and is engaged in department store and retailing business in Guangdong, Sichuan, Chongqing and Jiangsu.

Maoye postponed in the Hong Kong Stock Exchange for two times in 2000 and January 2008 respectively due to poor stock market conditions at that time, until it was successfully listed on 5 May 2008. At the first trading day, its stock price closed at HK$3.04, 2% lower compared with its IPO price, HK$3.1.
