= Fujikon =

Audio electronics manufacturer

Fujikon Industrial Holdings Ltd.
- Company type: Public
- Industry: ODM/OEM (Original Design Manufacturer /Original equipment manufacturer)
- Founded: 1982
- Headquarters: Hong Kong; Dongguan, China; Ningbo, China
- Key people: Johnny Yeung, co-founder and chairman Simon Yuen, co-founder and vice-chairman Michael Chow, co-founder and vice-chairman
- Products: Headphones, microphones, loudspeakers, and handsfree headsets
- Revenue: HK$ 1.22 billion (2010/2011)
- Number of employees: 10,000
- Website: www.fujikon.com

Fujikon Industrial Holdings Ltd. (SEHK: 927) is a Hong Kong–based company founded in 1982. It manufactures and sells audio products. These include headphones, microphones, loudspeakers, and handsfree headsets. All these products are sold on an ODM/OEM (original design manufacturer /original equipment manufacturer) basis to well-known brands and international customers. The company was listed on the main board of the Hong Kong Stock Exchange in 2000.
