= Zhejiang Expressway Company =

Chinese road infrastructure company

Zhejiang Expressway Company Limited
- Native name: 浙江滬杭甬高速公路股份有限公司
- Company type: State-owned enterprise
- Industry: Road construction and operations
- Founded: 1997
- Headquarters: Hangzhou, Zhejiang, People's Republic of China
- Area served: China
- Key people: Chairman: Mr. Chen Jisong
- Website: Zhejiang Expressway Company Limited

Zhejiang Expressway Company Limited (SEHK: 576) is an infrastructure company engaged in investing, developing and operating expressways in Zhejiang Province, China. It also carries out other related businesses such as automobile servicing, gas station operation and billboard advertising along expressways.
