= Shanghai Petrochemical =

Chinese petrochemical company

Shanghai Petrochemical Company Limited 中国石化上海石油化工股份有限公司
- Type: Public; State-owned enterprise
- Traded as: SEHK: 338; SSE: 600688
- Industry: Chemical industry
- Founded: 1972
- Headquarters: Jinshan District, Shanghai, China
- Area served: China
- Key people: Chairman: Mr. Rong Guangdao
- Products: ethylene, fiber, resin, plastics
- Parent: Sinopec
- Website: Description from SINOPEC SINOPEC Shanghai Petrochemical Co., Ltd.

Shanghai Petrochemical (Chinese: 上海石化), full name Sinopec Shanghai Petrochemical Company Limited (Chinese: 中国石化上海石油化工股份有限公司; pinyin: Zhōngguóshíhuà Shànghǎi Shíyóu Huàgōng Gǔfènyǒuxiàngōngsī), the subsidiary company of Sinopec, is one of the largest petrochemical enterprises in Mainland China. It is engaged in production of ethylene, fiber, resin and plastics. The company is registered in Shanghai.

Its headquarters are in Jinshan District, Shanghai.

There have been hopes that Sinopec, Shanghai Petrochemical's parent company, will process share reform and privatize Yizeng Chemical Fibre and Sinopec Shanghai Petrochemical, but the plan does not finalize until this moment.
