= Lijun International Pharmaceutical (Holding) Co. Ltd. =

Hong Kong pharmaceutical company

Lijun International Pharmaceutical (Holding) Co., Limited (simplified Chinese: 利君国际医药(控股)有限公司; traditional Chinese: 利君國際醫藥(控股)有限公司) (SEHK: 2005) is a Wanchai, Hong Kong–based investment holding company with two pharmaceutical business segments:

== Business segments ==
- manufacturing and selling of intravenous infusion solution
- manufacturing and selling of antibiotics and others

The Group was listed on Hong Kong Stock Exchange in December 2005 (stock code: 2005).

The Group is engaged in the research, development, manufacturing and selling of a wide range of finished medicines and bulk pharmaceutical products to hospitals and distributors, including antibiotics, intravenous infusion solution, non-antibiotics finished products, bulk pharmaceuticals and health care product.

== Subsidiaries ==
The Company’s subsidiaries include:

- New Orient Limited (New Orient) in Hong Kong
- Shijiazhuang No. 4 Pharmaceutical Co., Limited, intravenous infusion solution manufacturer in Hebei Province (acquired in June 2007)
- Xi’an Lijun Pharmaceutical Co., Limited (Xi’an Lijun), engaged in manufacturing pharmaceuticals in Shaanxi Province
- Shenzhen Lijun Pharmaceutical Co., Limited, engaged in manufacturing pharmaceuticals in Guangdong Province.

The Company is the largest domestic manufacturer of macrolide antibiotics, with a leading position for its intravenous infusion solution products in high-end hospital market.

Facing more merger and acquisition opportunities from medical reform in China, the Group is positioned for continuous mergers and acquisitions to promote its growth.
