= Yizheng Chemical Fibre =

Subsidiary company of Sinopec

Yizheng Chemical Fiber 仪征化纤股份
- Company type: State-owned enterprise
- Traded as: SEHK: 1033; SSE: 600871
- Industry: Chemical industry
- Founded: 1993
- Headquarters: Yizheng, Jiangsu, People's Republic of China
- Area served: People's Republic of China
- Key people: Chairman: Qian Hengge
- Products: Chemical fiber production
- Parent: Sinopec
- Website: www.ycfc.com/en

Yizheng Chemical Fiber (simplified Chinese: 仪征化纤; traditional Chinese: 儀征化纖), full name "Sinopec Yizheng Chemical Fiber Company Limited", abbreviated as "Yizheng", is a subsidiary company of Sinopec, which is engaged in sales and production of fibers and fiber materials on Mainland China. The headquarters of the company is located at Yizheng City, Jiangsu Province.

There have been hopes that Sinopec, Yizheng's parent company, will process share reform and privatize Yizheng Chemical Fiber and Sinopec Shanghai Petrochemical, but the plan has not been finalized.

Yizheng has both A share and H share listed in Shanghai Stock Exchange and Hong Kong Stock Exchange respectively, with the greatest difference between A and H share prices currently. It also has the largest 6tr EUhistorical P/E ratio among all H shares, currently more than 200 times.
