= Zengame Technology =

Chinese mobile game developer

- Type: Public
- Traded as: SEHK: 2660
- Founded: July 2010
- Key people: Ye Sheng (chairman, CEO)
- Revenue: ▲¥742 million (2020)
- Net income: ▲¥221 million (2020)
- Website: zen-game.com

Zengame Technology (simplified Chinese: 禅游科技; traditional Chinese: 禪遊科技; SEHK: 2660), short for Zengame Technology Holding Limited, generally known as Zengame, is a Shenzhen-based mobile game developer, and operator established in July 2010 by Zeng Liqing. The company focuses on the development and operation of mobile games, as well as operating games developed by third parties. Its categories of games include card games, board games, and other casual games, all of which can be played free of charge.

The main products of Zengame contain Fighting the Landlord, Sichuan Mahjong and Fast Fish Catcher. The firm officially landed on the Hong Kong Stock Exchange on 16 April 2019 under the stock ticker symbol "2660", raising HK$221 million. As of the end of December 2019, it had a total of 720 million registered users and an average of 48.538 million active users per month.

== History ==
Zengame was founded in July 2010, and it once received an equity participation from 37Games. In 2017, its monthly active users (MAUs) for board and card games clocked 21.6 million.

In May 2018, the company launched an in-game information service. As of December 31, the cumulative number of registered users under the games of Zengame reached approximately 443 million.

On 16 April 2019, Zengame was listed on the HKSE, with Guotai Junan as its sole sponsor. In H2 2019, it started to develop overseas operations.
