= Hidili Industry International Development Limited =

Hidili Industry International Development Limited 恒鼎实业国际发展有限公司
- Company type: Privately held company
- Industry: Coal mining
- Founded: 2000
- Founder: Mr. Xian Yang
- Headquarters: Panzhihua, Sichuan, People's Republic of China
- Area served: People's Republic of China
- Key people: Chairman: Mr. Xian Yang
- Products: Coal, coke, coal-related chemicals
- Website: Hidili Industry International Development Limited

Hidili Industry International Development Limited (SEHK: 1393; simplified Chinese: 恒鼎实业国际发展有限公司; traditional Chinese: 恆鼎實業國際發展有限公司), in short form Hidili Industry or Hidili, founded in 2000, is a civilian-run enterprise in mainland China. It is engaged in the productions of coal and coke and coal-related chemicals in Sichuan province and Guizhou Province. It was listed in Hong Kong Stock Exchange on 21 September 2007. The founder and the chairman of the company is Mr. Xian Yang, a former policeman in Sichuan province.

== History ==
Before being listing in Hong Kong Stock Exchange, there was an advertisement in a Hong Kong newspaper, which claimed to sell Hidili's stocks to the public personally. Hidili later denied this advertisement. But according to Hong Kong law, it is illegal to sell the stocks of unlisted companies.

Hidili was listed in the Hong Kong Stock Exchange on 21 September 2007. The closed price on the first trading day was HK$12.12, which was 77% greater than its IPO price, HK$6.83, but it reached about 150 P/E ratio.

On 16 October 2007, the Baring Private Equity Asia III Holding (5A) Limited, one of the shareholders which held 11% of Hidili shares, announced to sell all shares at the price between HK$13.58 and HK$14.32 via UBS. There were some worries that the share price was abnormally high currently.
