= Chenming Paper =

Chinese paper manufacturer and power generator

Shandong Chenming Paper Holdings Limited 山东晨鸣纸业集团股份有限公司
- Company type: Public
- Traded as: SZSE: 000488 (A share); SZSE: 200488 (B share); SEHK: 1812 (H share)
- Industry: Papermaking
- Founded: 1996
- Headquarters: Shouguang, Shandong, China
- Area served: China
- Key people: Chairman: Mr. Chen Hongguo
- Revenue: $3.32 billion (2013)
- Operating income: $65 million (2013)
- Website: www.chenmingpaper.com

Shandong Chenming Paper Holdings Limited, or known as Chenming Paper or Chenming Group, is engaged in the manufacture and sales of paper pulp, papermaking and power generation. It offers art paper, lightweight-coated paper, newspaper paper, paperboard paper, duplex press paper, white paperboard paper and writing paper. It is the largest papermaking enterprise in China. Based in Shouguang, Shandong, China, Chenming Paper is ranked among the top 50 paper producers worldwide by PWC. It is currently the largest paper producer in China by volumes sold. Chenming has approximately 15,700 employees from eight paper mills located at different provinces of China.

As of 8 November 2016 the company is in the constituents of SZSE Component Index but not in SZSE 300 Index, making the company was ranked between the 301st to 500th by free float adjusted market capitalization.

== History ==
The predecessor of Chenming paper, also known as Shouguang state owned paper mill, was established in 1958. The mill did not expand its production capacity until 30 years later. In 1988, The company experienced a change of management which was followed by their production reform in hope of expanding the company. In 1993, Chenming took a step further to transform itself from a state owned enterprise to corporation, offering its employees the opportunity to take ownership of the company. Inspired by the change, Chenming went into a rapid growth phase, buying out many heavily in debt paper mills around China and turned them around by bring in new management skills and advanced technology.

It is the 18th largest company in the paper sector in 2010, with a production of 3.350 million tons.
