= China Water Industry Group =

China Water Industry Group Limited (Chinese: 中国水业集团有限公司; pinyin: Zhōngguó Shuǐ yè jítuán yǒuxiàngōngsī) (SEHK: 1129) is an investment holding company, organized into five business divisions: provision of water supply and sewage treatment; construction of water supply and sewage treatment infrastructures; assets in financial and investment products; trading of watches and accessories; and others.

== History ==
The group was founded in 2002 as Sky Hawk Computer Group Limited, was listed on the Hong Kong Stock Exchange. Over time the company acquired other companies and changed its business and name to reflect its water management business. In 2006, it changed its structure and business nature to reflect its water business presence.

Jinan Hongquan Water Production Co., Ltd was acquired by China Water Industry Group through the acquisition of Blue Mountain Hong Kong Group Limited on January 18, 2008. On August 12, 2008, China Water Industry Group acquired Plenty One Limited. On November 13, 2008, China Water Industry Group acquired a 51% interest in an existing 49% held associate, Danzhou Water Pipe. On March 27, 2009 Jining City Haiyuan Water Treatment Company Limited, an indirect subsidiary of China Water Industry Group, disposed all its asset and liabilities.
