= Shenzhen Investment =

Shenzhen Investment Limited, China, 1997

Shenzhen Investment Limited 深圳控股有限公司
- Company type: State-owned enterprise (Red chip)
- Traded as: SEHK: 604
- Industry: Conglomerate
- Founded: 1991
- Headquarters: Hong Kong, People's Republic of China
- Area served: People's Republic of China
- Key people: Chairman: Mr. Hu Aimin
- Parent: Shenzhen Investment Holding Corporation
- Website: Shenzhen Investment Limited

Shenzhen Investment Limited is a property developer in Southern China, partly owned by Shenzhen Government. It is also involved in the infrastructure and cement sectors through other companies. It was listed on the Hong Kong Stock Exchange in 1997.
