= Fufeng Group =

Chinese biofermentation company listed in Hong Kong

Fufeng Group Limited
- Type: Public company
- Traded as: SEHK: 546
- Industry: Biofermentation
- Founded: 1999; 27 years ago
- Founder: Li Xuechun
- Headquarters: Qingdao, Shandong, China
- Key people: Li Xuechun (Chairman)
- Products: Monosodium glutamate, xanthan gum, amino acids, starch products
- Revenue: RMB 28.0 billion (2023)
- Number of employees: 17,376 (2024)
- Website: www.fufeng-group.com

Fufeng Group
- Traditional Chinese: 阜豐集團
- Simplified Chinese: 阜丰集团
Transcriptions
Standard Mandarin
- Hanyu Pinyin: Fùfēng Jítuán

Fufeng Group Limited (SEHK: 546; Chinese: 阜丰集团有限公司; pinyin: Fùfēng Jítuán Yǒuxiàn Gōngsī; lit. 'Rich Abundance Group') is a publicly listed Chinese multinational bio-fermentation company. It is one of the world's largest producers of monosodium glutamate (MSG) and xanthan gum. Incorporated in the Cayman Islands and headquartered in Qingdao, Shandong Province, the company's core business is the large-scale transformation of corn into a range of industrial ingredients for the food, animal nutrition, and pharmaceutical industries.

Founded in 1999 by Li Xuechun from the assets of a former state-owned MSG factory in Shandong, Fufeng Group has grown from a regional manufacturer into a global company. The company was listed on the Main Board of the Hong Kong Stock Exchange on February 8, 2007. Its products are distributed across China and exported to over 100 countries and regions worldwide, with an annual outbound logistics volume exceeding 5 million tons.

By 2024, the group's total operating revenue was approximately RMB 27.8 billion. The company holds a significant position in the global MSG market. Fufeng is also one of the world's leading producers of xanthan gum.

== History ==
=== Origins and Founding (1999) ===
The origins of Fufeng Group are linked to the industrial restructuring of rural China in the late 1990s. The company's predecessor was the Shandong Ju'nan MSG Factory, a state-owned enterprise in Junan County, Shandong. In 1999, the Junan County government approved the sale of certain assets, which were subsequently transferred to a newly formed private entity, Shandong Fufeng Fermentation Co., Ltd.

The acquisition was led by Li Xuechun, who pooled funds with co-workers to purchase the former MSG workshop. He built the enterprise through cost-control measures, acquiring production equipment from other factories and engaging in price competition to gain market share. In its first year of operation, Shandong Fufeng produced MSG, glutamic acid, and cornstarch, establishing the core product lines that would define the company's subsequent growth.

=== Industrialization and Geographic Expansion (2000–2010) ===
Through the early 2000s, Fufeng grew rapidly, supported by the growth of China's food service and processed food industries. The company's expansion strategy was based on establishing large-scale production bases in regions with access to corn supplies and lower energy costs. In 2005, Fufeng established Inner Mongolia Fufeng Biotechnology Co., Ltd., gaining access to corn-producing regions of northern China. By 2008, the company had diversified into corn refined products, fertilizers, and xanthan gum.

On February 8, 2007, Fufeng Group Limited was listed on the Main Board of the Hong Kong Stock Exchange (0546.HK). The listing provided access to capital markets that funded subsequent expansion. The IPO was followed by a profit warning as a rise in corn prices reduced margins, causing the share price to fall below its IPO price. The company continued its expansion plans thereafter.

=== Product Diversification and Scale-Up (2010–2018) ===
The period from 2008 to 2018 was characterized by capacity additions and diversification of the product portfolio into specialty chemicals. In 2010, Hulunbuir Northeast Fufeng Biotechnology Co., Ltd. was established in Qiqihar, Heilongjiang Province. In 2012, Xinjiang Fufeng Biotechnologies Co., Ltd. was registered as a high-end amino acid production facility. A further facility, Qiqihar Longjiang Fufeng Biological Technology Co., Ltd., was established in 2017, with its Phase II commencing production in January 2019.

By 2018, revenue stood at RMB 13.8 billion, with MSG representing 48% of sales. The company's effective production capacity expanded significantly over this period, with the addition of new fermentation lines and product categories including threonine and high-end amino acids.

=== Maturity and Global Expansion (2019–Present) ===
By the 2020s, Fufeng Group's revenue exceeded RMB 20 billion. In 2020, Fufeng USA completed corporate registration in Illinois, indicating an intent to establish a manufacturing presence in the United States.

In March 2025, Fufeng resolved an intellectual property dispute through a settlement in which defendants including Xinjiang Meihua Amino Acid Co., Ltd. and Meihua Bio agreed to pay RMB 233 million in relation to trade secrets concerning xanthan gum production.

== Corporate Affairs ==
=== Ownership and Leadership ===
Fufeng Group is a privately owned company incorporated in the Cayman Islands and listed on the Hong Kong Stock Exchange. Li Xuechun serves as Chairman and is the company's founder. Li Guangyu and Li Deheng serve as executive directors.

=== Financial Performance ===
Revenue grew from approximately RMB 449 million in 2003 to over RMB 28 billion by 2023. The company's profitability is sensitive to corn prices and supply-demand conditions in the MSG and xanthan gum markets.

Financial Highlights (RMB Billion)
Year	Revenue	Profit Attributable to Shareholders
2020	16.69	0.95
2021	21.54	1.10
2022	27.47	1.20
2023	28.01	3.14
2024	27.76	2.31

Source: Fufeng Group Annual Results Announcements, HKEXnews.

Profitability increased in 2023 as commodity prices normalized and demand recovered, before declining in 2024 due to lower gross profits from the colloid and food additives segments. In the first half of 2025, profit attributable to shareholders rose approximately 73% year-on-year. Fufeng has maintained a dividend payout ratio of approximately 40%.

== Operations and Scale ==
Fufeng is a large-scale bio-fermentation company. Its business model is built on the transformation of corn into industrial ingredients through biofermentation, which allows for economies of scale in raw material procurement, energy consumption, and logistics.

=== Production Facilities ===
Fufeng operates a network of production bases located in China's corn-producing regions.

Major Production Subsidiaries
Subsidiary	Location	Key Products
Shandong Fufeng Fermentation Co., Ltd.	Junan County, Linyi, Shandong	MSG, glutamic acid, starch
Baoji Fufeng Biological Technology Co., Ltd.	Baoji, Shaanxi	MSG, amino acids
Inner Mongolia Fufeng Biotechnology Co., Ltd.	Inner Mongolia	MSG, xanthan gum
Hulunbuir Northeast Fufeng Biotechnology Co., Ltd.	Qiqihar, Heilongjiang	MSG, amino acids
Xinjiang Fufeng Biotechnologies Co., Ltd.	Xinjiang	High-end amino acids
Qiqihar Longjiang Fufeng Biological Technology Co., Ltd.	Qiqihar, Heilongjiang	MSG, amino acids

Source: Fufeng Group Annual Report 2024, HKEXnews.

=== Production Capacity ===
The company's annual production capacities for its principal products are as follows:

Annual Production Capacity
Product	Capacity (tonnes)
MSG and Glutamic Acid	2,500,000
Starch Sugar	1,000,000
Bio-fertilizer	900,000
Xanthan Gum	80,000–100,000

Source: Fufeng Group Annual Report 2024, HKEXnews.

=== Logistics and Global Reach ===
Fufeng has invested in logistics infrastructure, including dedicated railway lines and freight yards at its northern plants. The group's annual outbound logistics volume exceeds 5 million tons, of which export trade accounts for approximately 900,000 tons. Products are sold in China and exported to over 100 countries and regions, supported by five overseas representative offices.

== Market Position and Products ==
Fufeng Group holds significant positions in several global markets characterized by high concentration. The company's competitive position is supported by its economies of scale, fermentation technology, and location in corn-producing regions of China.

=== Monosodium Glutamate (MSG) ===
Fufeng is one of the world's largest producers of MSG. The global MSG market is highly consolidated, with China supplying more than 60% of the world's output. Within China, the industry has consolidated from approximately 200 domestic producers in the early 2000s to three main players: Fufeng, Meihua Group, and EPPEN. These three companies control a majority of the domestic market's capacity.

Fufeng's estimated global market share in MSG ranges from approximately 20% to 31%, with a domestic Chinese market share estimated at approximately 57% by volume.

=== Xanthan Gum ===
Fufeng is one of the world's largest producers of xanthan gum, with an estimated global market share of approximately 30%. The company's xanthan gum operations are primarily export-oriented, with a significant proportion of production sold to international customers. China accounts for a substantial share of the world's xanthan gum output, and Fufeng is a leading Chinese producer.

=== Amino Acids and Animal Nutrition ===
Fufeng is also a producer of amino acids for animal feed, including lysine, threonine, and valine. China is a major global producer of these products. The company's Xinjiang facility is positioned as a high-end amino acid production base.

=== Product Portfolio ===
Fufeng's product portfolio is organized into four principal categories:

- Food Additives: MSG, glutamic acid, citric acid, and sodium bicarbonate.
- Water-Soluble Gums (Hydrocolloids): Xanthan gum and gellan gum.
- Animal Nutrition Products: Feed-grade amino acids including lysine, threonine, and valine.
- High-End Amino Acids: Specialty amino acids for pharmaceutical and nutraceutical applications.

Beyond these categories, the company also produces starch sugar, bio-fertilizer, and other biological health products.

== North Dakota Project ==
In 2021, Fufeng Group announced plans to construct a $700 million wet corn milling plant in Grand Forks, North Dakota. The company purchased approximately 300 acres of farmland for the project.

The project faced opposition on national security grounds due to the proposed plant site's location approximately 12 miles from Grand Forks Air Force Base. Concerns were raised by members of the U.S. Congress about the potential for the facility to be used for intelligence collection. The U.S.-China Economic and Security Review Commission and members of the U.S. Senate Select Committee on Intelligence voiced opposition and requested a review by the Committee on Foreign Investment in the United States (CFIUS).

CFIUS reviewed the transaction and concluded that it lacked jurisdiction because it was a greenfield investment in undeveloped land. In January 2023, the United States Air Force issued a letter describing the proposed plant as a "significant threat to national security." On February 7, 2023, the Grand Forks City Council voted 5–0 to deny the infrastructure and building permits for the project, halting its development.

The controversy contributed to legislative measures at the state and federal levels restricting the purchase of U.S. farmland by certain foreign entities. As of 2025, Fufeng was reportedly seeking an alternative site in the United States for the investment.

== International Expansion ==
Fufeng Group has continued to pursue international expansion.

=== Kazakhstan ===
In April 2025, Fufeng Group began construction on an $800 million agro-industrial park in the Zhambyl Region of Kazakhstan. The project will have an annual corn processing capacity of 1 million tonnes. The company plans to source 500,000 tonnes of locally grown corn annually starting in 2025, with the plant expected to reach full operational capacity in 2026. The facility is positioned as a hub for expansion into Central Asia.

=== Other International Activities ===
In early 2026, Fufeng completed the acquisition of Viva World Trade Inc. to support its global market expansion. The company is also reportedly constructing additional overseas plants and expanding regional sales offices.

== Honors and Recognition ==
Fufeng Group has received honors and certifications, including ISO 9001 and GMP certification. It has been designated as a National High-tech Enterprise and a National Excellent Leading Food Enterprise. The "Fufeng" trademark has been recognized as a well-known trademark in China. The company has been ranked among China's Top 500 Private Enterprises and was included on the Fortune China 500 list.

In 2023, Fufeng Group was recognized as one of the recipients of the "China Best ESG Employers" award by Aon, a global professional services firm that publishes an annual list evaluating environmental, social and governance (ESG) practices among Chinese companies. In 2025, Fufeng Group was again included on Aon's "China Best ESG Employers" award list.
