= Digital China =

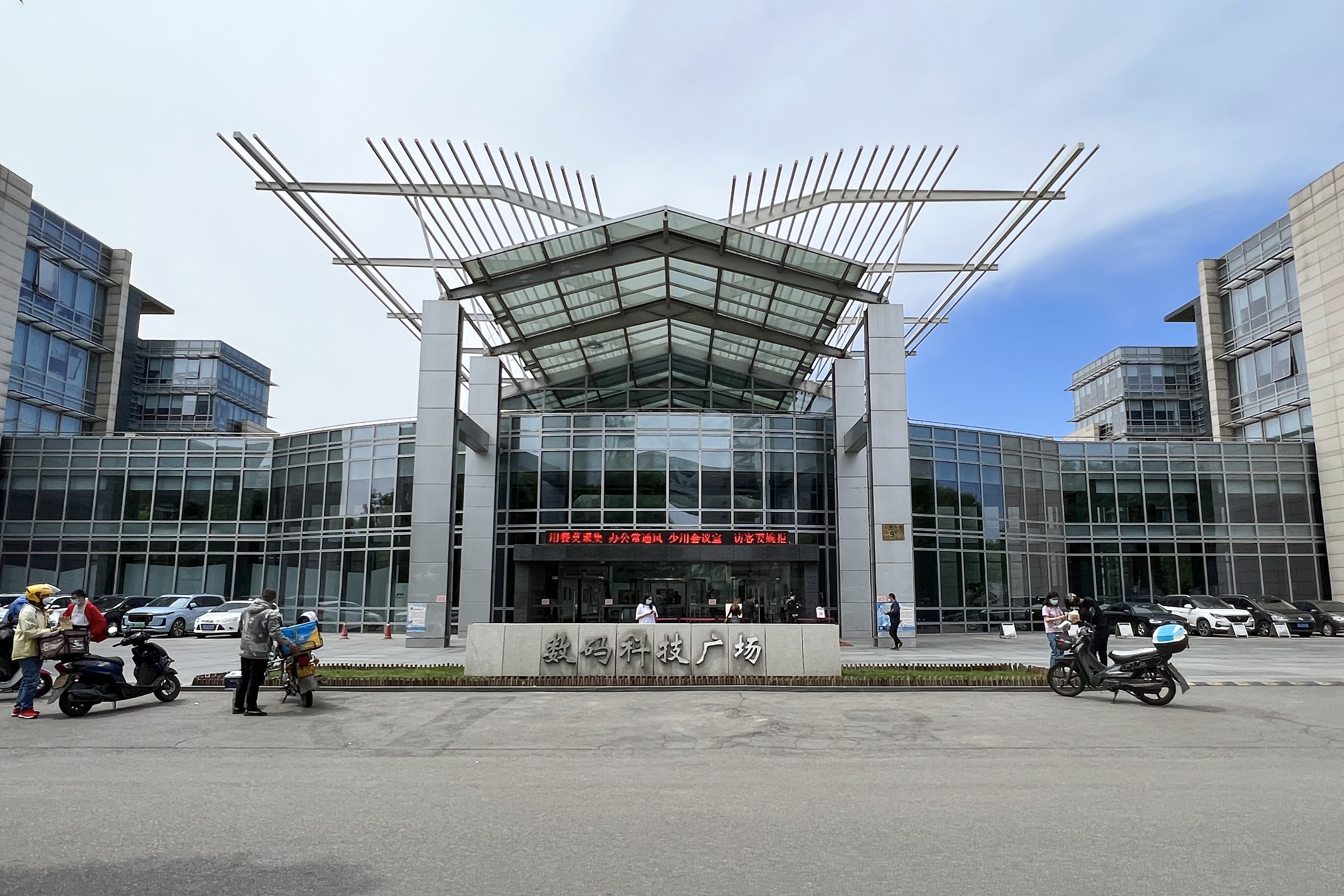
Digital China Beijing offices

Digital China (SEHK: 861) is a company listed on the main board of The Stock Exchange of Hong Kong. In 2001, it separated from the Legend Group.

== History ==
Digital China was created from Legend Holdings, which became Lenovo in 2001.

Digital China focuses on providing e-business platforms, solutions and services. The concept of integrated IT services (one-stop) spans from banking and telecommunications to government and public sectors. Partnering with over 100 major IT service providers worldwide, Digital China is one of the leading integrated IT service providers in China.

For 2023, the company's operating income was 55.601 billion yuan, net profit (parent company) was 433 million yuan (an increase of 11.19% over 2022).

In 2024, Digital China Group and Ministry of Digital Economy and Society of Thailand by Digital Economy Promotion Agency entered into an agreement to cooperate in developing the digital economy, cloud computing, and building digital infrastructure, including big data centers.

== See also ==
- Legend Holdings
- Lenovo
