= Yuexiu Property =

Chinese property development company

Yuexiu Property Company Limited 越秀地產有限公司
- Company type: State-owned enterprise (Red chip)
- Traded as: SEHK: 123; SGX: G10
- Industry: Property development
- Founded: 1992
- Headquarters: Hong Kong, China
- Area served: People's Republic of China
- Key people: Chairman: Mr. Zhang Zhaoxing
- Parent: Guangzhou Yuexiu Holdings Limited
- Website: www.yuexiuproperty.com

Yuexiu Property Company Limited is a property developer located in Guangdong, China. Its major shareholder is Guangzhou Yuexiu Holdings Limited, the investment corporation of the Guangzhou Government in Hong Kong.

== History ==
It is incorporated in Hong Kong and it was listed on the Hong Kong Stock Exchange as red chip stock in 1992.

The company was formerly known as Guangzhou Investment Company Limited and changed its name to Yuexiu Property Company Limited in 2009.

== See also ==
- Real estate in China
