= Greenheart Group =

Hong Kong forestry company

Greenheart Group 綠心集團
- Company type: Public
- Traded as: SEHK: 94
- Industry: Forestry; Wood Products
- Founded: 2010
- Headquarters: Hong Kong
- Key people: Judson Martin (Chairman, CEO)
- Products: Lumber, Logs
- Revenue: ▲HK$495.2 million 2012
- Number of employees: >700 (2013)
- Website: http://www.greenheartgroup.com

Greenheart Group
- Traditional Chinese: 綠心集團
- Simplified Chinese: 绿心集团
Transcriptions

Greenheart Group (SEHK: 94) is a listed multi-national forestry company based in Hong Kong established in 2010.

The company owns 13,000 hectares of softwood plantation forest in New Zealand and 322,000 hectares of concessions and harvesting rights in Suriname. Greenheart sells softwood logs to China, India, South Korea and also domestically in New Zealand. The company also sells hardwood lumber, and various wood products to China and European countries. In 2012, it commissioned a new sawmill and signed agreement to construct a bioenergy plant in Suriname.

== Sustainable Forest Management ==
Greenheart Group currently has Forest Stewardship Council (FSC®) controlled wood status in West Suriname forest concession and full Forest Stewardship Council (FSC®) certification for its Central Suriname forest concession. The company practices sustainable forest management and silviculture systems to ensure a systematic pruning which allows a faster natural regeneration of trees.

== Plantations ==
=== New Zealand Radiata Pine Plantation ===
Greenheart Group operates a softwood plantation forest business in New Zealand with radiata pine as main its main commercial species. The company exports its radiata pine logs to countries such as China, India, Korea and Japan.

=== Suriname Natural Forest Concession ===
Greenheart Group operates a hardwood business in Suriname. The company practices sustainable forest harvesting and has two large scale sawmills to produce lumber for sales to Europe and Asia. The company is also building a bioenergy plant to convert timber waste into clean energy.

== Annual financial information (2010-2012) ==
Greenheart's annual revenue has increased 29 times since formal branding and establishment in 2010.

Financial Information
	2010	2011	2012
Total Revenue (HK$M)	17,031	326,984	495,226
Adjusted EBITDA (HK$M)	NA	12.6	38.2
