= Tiangong International =

Chinese specialty steel manufacturer

Tiangong International Limited 天工國際有限公司
- Company type: Public company
- Traded as: SEHK: 826
- Industry: Steel, Tool steel, Titanium alloys
- Founded: 1984
- Headquarters: Danyang, Jiangsu, People's Republic of China
- Area served: Worldwide
- Key people: Chairman: Mr. Zhu Xiaokun
- Products: High-speed steel, die steel, cutting tools, titanium alloys
- Revenue: RMB 5.74 billion (2021)
- Net income: RMB 671.6 million (2021)
- Website: www.tggj.cn

Tiangong International Limited (Chinese: 天工國際有限公司) is a publicly traded Chinese company engaged in the production and sale of specialty steel materials. The company is one of China's largest producers of high-speed steel (HSS), die steel, cutting tools, and titanium alloys. Headquartered in Danyang, Jiangsu Province, it was founded in 1984 and listed on the Hong Kong Stock Exchange in 2007.

== Business Segments ==
Tiangong International operates through the following core divisions:

=== High-Speed Steel (HSS) ===
Tiangong is a major global supplier of high-speed steel, offering grades such as M2, M35, and M42. These materials are widely used in the manufacturing of industrial cutting tools, drills, and saw blades.

=== Die Steel ===
The company produces hot work and cold work die steels for applications in automotive stamping, extrusion, forging, and plastic mold tooling industries.

=== Cutting Tools ===
Tiangong manufactures finished tools such as twist drills, milling cutters, reamers, taps, and other precision tools used in machining and manufacturing.

=== Titanium Alloys ===
The company has expanded into the production of titanium alloys, which are used in aerospace, biomedical implants, energy, and industrial processing sectors due to their high strength and corrosion resistance.

=== Trading Division ===
This business segment handles domestic and international distribution of tool steels, raw materials, and alloy products, complementing the company's integrated supply chain.

== Operations ==
Tiangong International operates its main production base in Danyang, Jiangsu Province. The manufacturing facilities cover melting (including EAF and ESR), forging, hot rolling, heat treatment, and precision machining processes.

The company maintains an R&D center with a focus on metallurgical innovation and alloy development. As of 2021, Tiangong held over 150 national patents and participated in the drafting of multiple national standards for tool steel.

Its products are distributed both domestically and internationally, with export markets including Europe, Southeast Asia, the United States, and the Middle East.
