= List of companies of Hong Kong =

Location of Hong Kong

Hong Kong is an autonomous territory of the People's Republic of China on the Pearl River Delta of East Asia. Hong Kong is one of the world's most significant financial centres, with the highest Financial Development Index score and consistently ranks as the world's most competitive and freest economic entity. As world's 8th largest trading entity, its legal tender, the Hong Kong dollar, is the world's 13th most traded currency. Hong Kong's tertiary sector dominated economy is characterised by simple taxation with a competitive level of corporate tax and supported by its independent judiciary system. However, while Hong Kong has one of the highest per capita incomes in the world, it suffers from severe income inequality.

For further information on the types of business entities in this region and their abbreviations, see "Business entities in Hong Kong".

== Notable firms ==
This list includes notable companies with primary headquarters located in the city. The industry and sector follow the Industry Classification Benchmark taxonomy. Organizations which have ceased operations are included and noted as defunct.

Notable companies Status: P=Private, S=State; A=Active, D=Defunct
Name	Industry	Sector	Headquarters	Founded	Notes	Status	
Aji Ichiban	Consumer services	Food retailers & wholesalers	Hong Kong	1993	Snack food retailer	P	A
Amoy Food	Consumer goods	Food products	Tai Po	1928	Food and condiments	P	A
Animoca Brands	Technology	Software	Hong Kong	2011	Games	P	A
AS Watson	Consumer goods	Personal products	Hong Kong	1828	Health and beauty retailer	P	A
Asia Pacific Vision	Consumer services	Broadcasting & entertainment	Wan Chai	1991	Video production	P	A
Ampd Energy	Industrials	Electronic & electrical equipment	Hong Kong	2014	Batteries	P	A
Baleno	Consumer services	Apparel retailers	Hong Kong	1996	Fashion retailer	P	A
Bank of China (Hong Kong)	Financials	Banks	Hong Kong	1964	Bank, part of Bank of China (China)	P	A
Bank of East Asia	Financials	Banks	Hong Kong	1918	Bank	P	A
Café de Coral	Consumer services	Restaurants & bars	Sha Tin	1968	Restaurants	P	A
Capital Artists	Consumer services	Broadcasting & entertainment	Hong Kong	1971	Record label	P	A
Cathay Dragon	Consumer services	Airlines	Hong Kong	1985	Defunct 2020, Subsidiary of Cathay Pacific	P	D
Cathay Pacific	Consumer services	Airlines	Hong Kong	1946	Airline	P	A
Chekiang First Bank	Financials	Banks	Hong Kong	1907	Defunct 2004	P	D
Chinachem Group	Financials	Banks	Tsuen Wan	1960	Real estate	P	A
Chu Kong Passenger Transport Co., Ltd	Industrials	Marine transportation	Hong Kong	1985	Passenger ferries	P	A
China CITIC Bank International	Financials	Banks	Hong Kong	1998	Bank	P	A
China International Fund	Real Estate	Infrastructure REITs	Hong Kong	2003	Infrastructure investment in the third world	P	A
City Telecom	Telecommunications	Fixed line telecommunications	Hong Kong	1992	Residential and corporate	P	A
Citybus Limited	Consumer services	Travel & tourism	Chai Wan	1979	Bus services (serving Hong Kong Island and Airport routes)	P	A
CK Hutchison Holdings	Conglomerates	-	Hong Kong	2015	Conglomerate and investment holdings	P	A
CLP Group	Utilities	Conventional electricity	Hong Kong	1901	Electric utility (Serves Kowloon, NT and Outlying Islands)	P	A
Commercial Radio Hong Kong	Consumer services	Broadcasting & entertainment	Hong Kong	1959	Radio	P	A
Crocodile Garments	Consumer services	Apparel retailers	Hong Kong	1952	Textile and fashion retailer	P	A
DBS Bank (Hong Kong)	Financials	Banks	Hong Kong	2003	Bank, part of DBS Bank (Singapore)	P	A
Dr. Kong	Consumer services	Specialty retailers	Hong Kong	1999	Shoes manufacturer and retailer	P	A
Esprit Holdings	Consumer services	Apparel retailers	Hong Kong	1968	Fashion, housewares retailer	P	A
FHProductionHK	Consumer services	Entertainment	Hong Kong	2012	Video production	P	A
Fujikon	Consumer goods	Consumer electronics	Hong Kong	1982	Audio products	P	A
G2000	Consumer services	Apparel retailers	Hong Kong	1980	Clothing retailer	P	A
Gammon Construction	Industrials	Heavy construction	Kwun Tong	1919	Construction	P	A
Giordano International	Consumer services	Apparel retailers	Hong Kong	1981	Clothing retailer	P	A
Goods of Desire	Consumer services	Apparel retailers	Hong Kong	1996	Clothing retailer	P	A
Green Island Cement	Industrials	Building materials & fixtures	Hong Kong	1887	Cement	P	A
Hang Seng Bank	Financials	Banks	Hong Kong	1933	Bank	P	A
Hantec Group	Financials	Financial services	Hong Kong	1990	Financial services	P	A
HK Express	Consumer services	Airlines	Tung Chung	2004	Low-cost airline, part of Cathay Pacific since 2019	P	A
HKR International	Consumer services	Hotels	Hong Kong	1970	Hotels	P	A
HNA Technology Investments Holdings	Technology	Computer hardware	Hong Kong	1995	Smart card technology	P	A
Hong Kong Airlines	Consumer services	Airlines	Hong Kong	2006	Airline (Part of HNA Group Hainan)	P	A
Hong Kong Broadband Network	Consumer Services	Telecommunication services	Hong Kong	1999	Telecommunications	P	A
Hong Kong Cable Television	Consumer services	Broadcasting & entertainment	Tsuen Wan	1993	Cable television broadcaster	P	A
Hong Kong Link	Industrials	Transportation services	Hong Kong	2004	State-owned infrastructure holding	S	A
Hong Kong Telecom	Consumer Services	Telecommunication services	Hong Kong	1925	Telecommunications (Subsidiary of PCCW)	P	A
Hong Nin Savings Bank	Financials	Banks	Hong Kong	1921	Defunct 1986	P	D
Hongkong and Shanghai Banking Corporation (HSBC)	Financials	Banks	Hong Kong	1865	Commercial bank and services (member of HSBC Group UK)	P	A
Hongkong Electric Company	Utilities	Conventional electricity	Hong Kong	1890	Electrical utility (Serves Hong Kong Island)	P	A
Hongkong Post	Industrials	Delivery services	Hong Kong	1841	State-owned Postal services	S	A
Hopewell Highway Infrastructure	Industrials	Transportation services	Hong Kong	2003	Part of Hopewell Holdings	P	A
Hopewell Holdings	Financials	Real estate holding & development	Hong Kong	1972	Infrastructure	P	A
I.T	Consumer services	Apparel retailers	Hong Kong	1988	Fashion	P	A
Jardine Matheson	Conglomerates	-	Hong Kong	1832	Conglomerate	P	A
Jebsen Group	Conglomerates	-	Hong Kong	1895	Conglomerate	P	A
Kowloon Motor Bus	Consumer services	Travel & tourism	Hong Kong	1933	Bus Services (Serves Kowloon, NT and Airport routes)	P	A
Kowloon-Canton Railway Corporation	Industrials	Railroads	Sha Tin	1982	State-owned Railway service (operations taken over by MTR Corporation)	S	A
Kuzu Mobile	Consumer goods	Consumer electronics	Hong Kong	2014	Engineering, manufacturing	P	A
Kwong On Bank	Financials	Banks	Hong Kong	1935	Bank	P	D
Li & Fung	Industrials	Delivery services	Hong Kong	1906	Supply chain manager	P	A
Lik Sang	Consumer services	Specialty retailers	Hong Kong	1998	Electronics, games	P	A
Long Win Bus	Consumer services	Travel & tourism	Hong Kong	1996	Bus services, part of Transport International Holdings Limited	P	A
Maxim's Caterers Limited	Consumer goods	Food products	Hong Kong	1956	Food and beverage	P	A
Mei Ah Entertainment	Consumer services	Broadcasting & entertainment	Hong Kong	1984	Media distribution	P	A
MTR Corporation	Consumer services	Travel & tourism	Hong Kong	1975	Metro	P	A
Nan Nan Resources	Energy	Coal	Hong Kong	1984	Coal mining	P	A
Nanyang Commercial Bank	Financials	Banks	Hong Kong	1949	Part of China Cinda Asset Management (China)	S	A
New Lantao Bus	Consumer services	Travel & tourism	Hong Kong	1973	Bus services, part of NWS Holdings	P	A
New World Development	Financials	Real estate holding & development	Hong Kong	1970	Real estate	P	A
New World First Bus	Consumer services	Travel & tourism	Hong Kong	1998	Bus services	P	A
Next Digital	Consumer services	Publishing	Hong Kong	1990	Publisher	P	A
Now TV (Hong Kong)	Consumer services	Broadcasting & entertainment	Hong Kong	2003	pay-TV service (subsidiary of PCCW)	P	A
OCBC Wing Hang Bank	Financials	Banks	Hong Kong	1937	Bank	P	A
Orange Sky Golden Harvest	Consumer services	Broadcasting & entertainment	Hong Kong	1970	Film	P	A
Outblaze	Technology	Software	Hong Kong	1998	Games, apps	P	A
Ovolo Hotels	Consumer services	Hotels	Hong Kong	2002	Hotels	P	A
Pacsafe	Consumer goods	Recreational products	Hong Kong	1998	Travel gear	P	A
PCCW	Technology	Technology hardware & equipment	Hong Kong	1925	Hardware, telecommunications	P	A
Po Sang Bank	Financials	Banks	Hong Kong	1949	Bank	P	D
Pomato	Consumer services	Entertainment	Hong Kong	2016	Video production	P	A
Qnet	Consumer goods	Personal products	Hong Kong	1998	Direct sell consumer goods	P	A
RoadShow	Consumer services	Broadcasting & entertainment	Hong Kong	2000	Advertising platform	P	A
Sapphire Technology	Technology	Computer Hardware	Sha Tin	2001	Motherboards and Graphics Cards (AMD)	P	A
Shanghai Commercial Bank	Financials	Banks	Hong Kong	1915	Bank	P	A
Shanghai Tang	Consumer services	Apparel retailers	Hong Kong	1994	Fashion	P	A
Shaw Brothers Studio	Consumer services	Broadcasting & entertainment	Hong Kong	1958	Defunct 2011	P	D
Sing Tao News Corporation	Consumer services	Broadcasting & entertainment	Hong Kong	1938	Media services	P	A
Sino Land	Financials	Real estate holding & development	Hong Kong	1981	Real estate	P	A
Soundbrenner	Consumer discretionary	Consumer electronics	Sheung Wan	2014	Music technology, software development	P	A
South China Morning Post	Consumer services	Publishing	Hong Kong	1903	Newspaper	P	A
Springland International	Consumer services	Broadline retailers	Hong Kong	1996	Retail chain	P	A
Sun Hung Kai Properties	Financials	Real estate holding & development	Hong Kong	1963	Real estate holdings	P	A
Tai Lin Radio Service	Consumer services	Specialty retailers	Hong Kong	1946	Defunct 2008	P	D
Team and Concepts Limited	Technology	Software	Hong Kong	2003	Software development	P	A
The Hongkong and Shanghai Hotels	Consumer services	Hotels	Hong Kong	1886	Luxury hotels, real estate and tourism assets	P	A
TVB	Consumer services	Broadcasting & entertainment	Hong Kong	1967	Television	P	A
The Cross-Harbour (Holdings)	Industrials	Transportation services	Hong Kong	1965	Transportation infrastructure	P	A
The Hong Kong and China Gas Company	Utilities	Gas distribution	Hong Kong	1862	Public utility	P	A
TOM Group	Consumer services	Broadcasting & entertainment	Hong Kong	1999	Media, part of CK Hutchison Holdings	P	A
Tom Lee Music	Consumer services	Specialty retailers	Hong Kong	1953	Musical instruments	P	A
U2 Clothing	Consumer services	Apparel retailers	Hong Kong	1980	Clothing	P	A
Vita Green	Consumer goods	Personal products	Hong Kong	1993	Health and beauty products	P	A
Vitasoy	Consumer goods	Food products	Tuen Mun	1940	Beverages and deserts	P	A
VTech	Technology	Telecommunications equipment	Hong Kong	1976	Cordless telephones	P	A
Wing Lung Bank	Financials	Banks	Hong Kong	1933	Banks	P	A
Wing Wah	Consumer services	Restaurants & bars	Hong Kong	1950	Restaurant chain	P	A

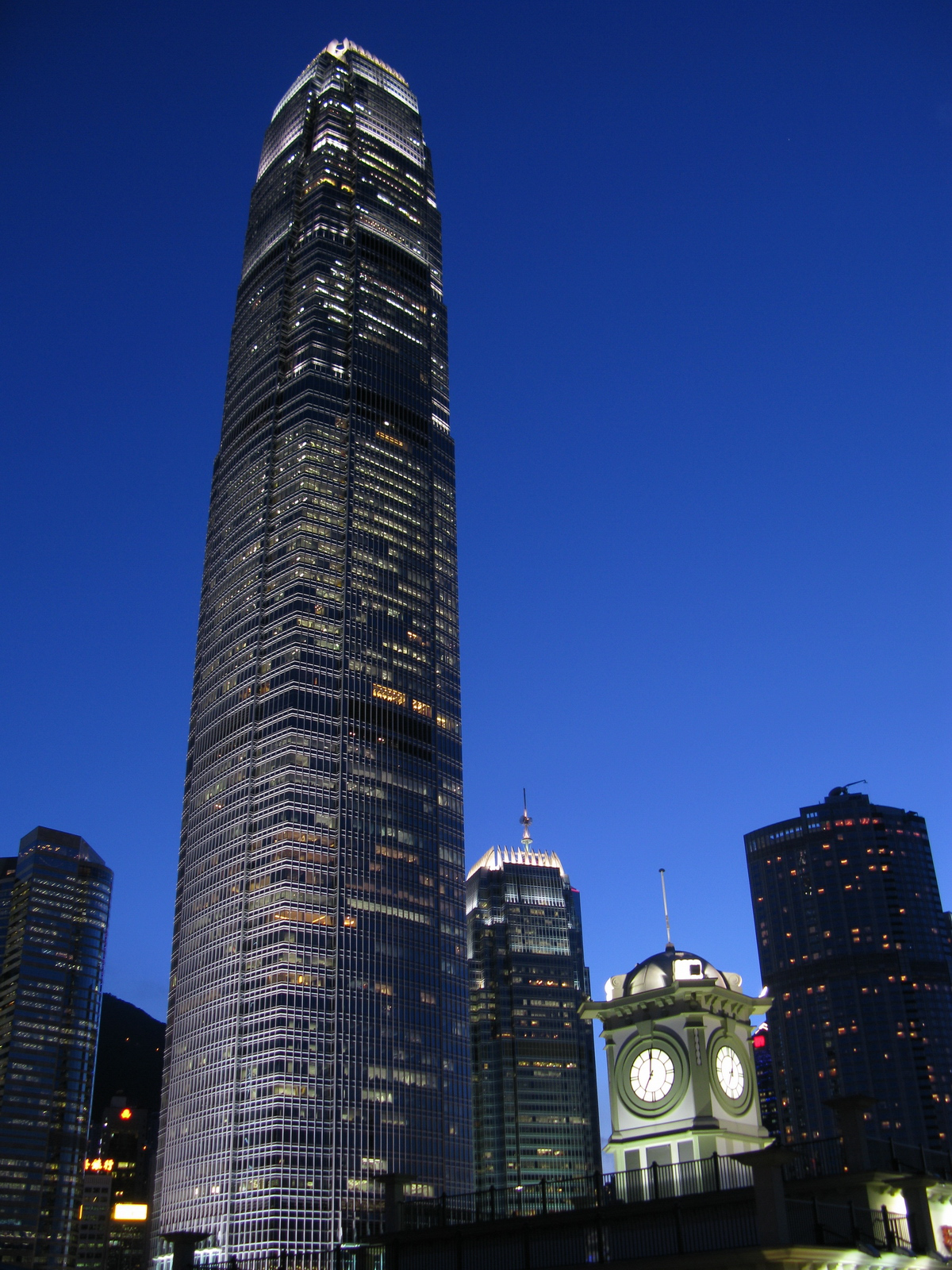
The Two International Finance Centre in Central.

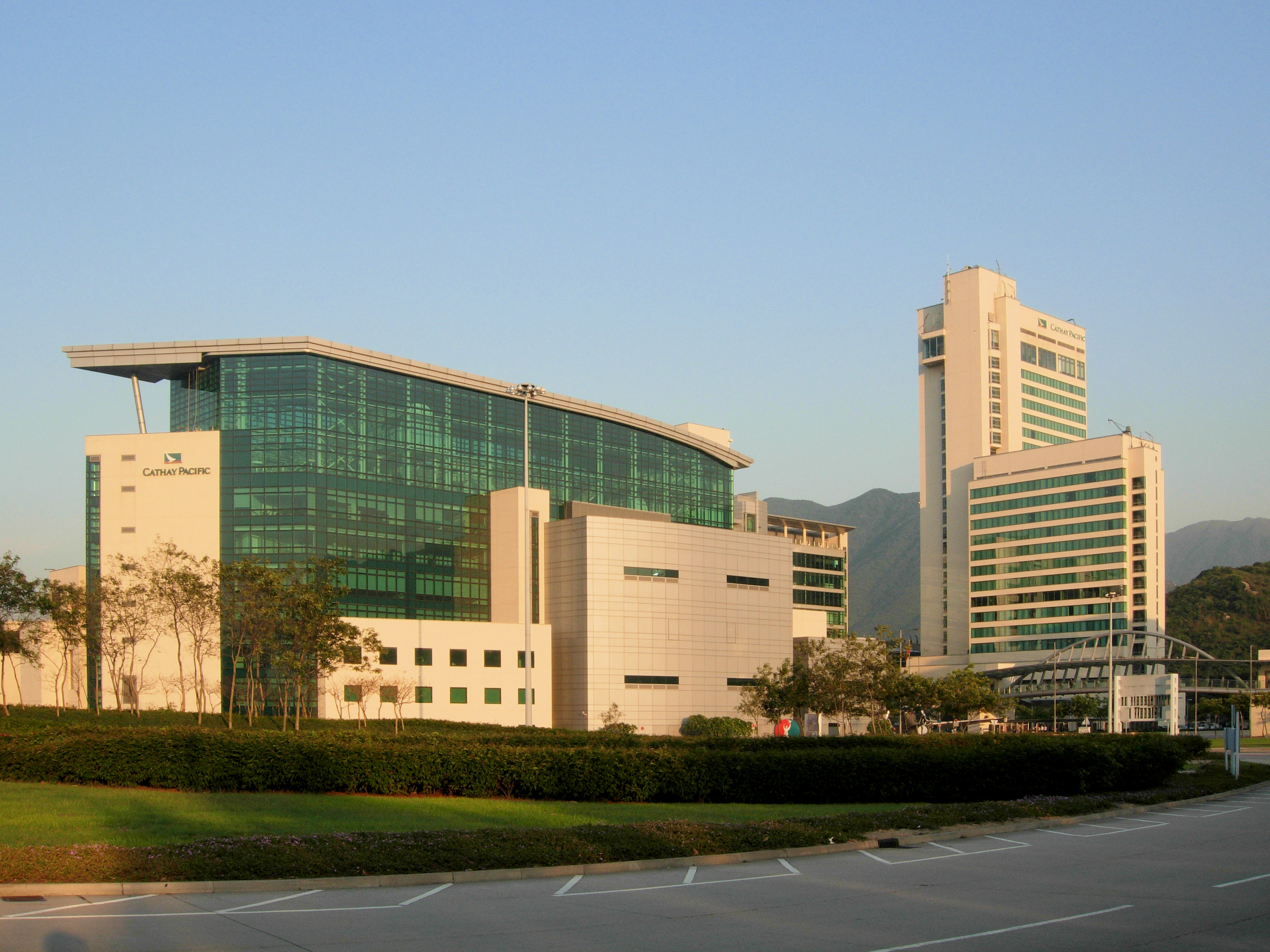
Cathay Pacific City, the headquarters of Cathay Pacific.

== See also ==
- Hong Kong Stock Exchange
- List of airlines of Hong Kong
- List of banks in Hong Kong
- List of companies listed on the Hong Kong Stock Exchange
- List of newspapers in Hong Kong
