= Baleno =

Baleno is a name for:

- Baleno (Hong Kong), clothing retailer
- Baleno, Masbate, municipality in the Philippines
- Suzuki Baleno, car
- Baleno, An Italian Folgore-class destroyer

== See also ==
- Balerno
