= Bangkok Elevated Road and Train System =

Cancelled elevated railway and highway project in Bangkok, Thailand

Overview
- Other name: Hopewell Project (Thai: โครงการโฮปเวลล์)
- Native name: โครงการระบบการขนส่งทางรถไฟยกระดับในกรุงเทพมหานคร
- Status: Cancelled
- Owner: Hopewell (Thailand) Ltd. (Hopewell Holdings)
- Locale: Bangkok Metropolitan Region

Service
- Type: Urban rail transit
- System: Bangkok Elevated Road and Train System
- Services: 2
- Rolling stock: AdTranz electric multiple units

Technical
- Line length: 60.10 km (37.34 mi)
- Number of tracks: Double-track
- Character: Elevated
- Track gauge: 1,435 mm (4 ft 8 1/2 in) standard gauge
- Electrification: Third rail 750V DC
- Operating speed: 80 km/h (50 mph)

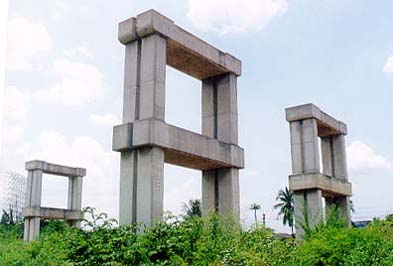
BERTS pillars between Bang Sue and Don Muang (nicknamed Thailand's Stonehenge), c. 1999

The Bangkok Elevated Road and Train System (BERTS, Thai: โครงการระบบการขนส่งทางรถไฟยกระดับในกรุงเทพมหานคร), commonly known as the Hopewell Project (Thai: โครงการโฮปเวลล์) after main contractor Hopewell Holdings, was a failed project to build an elevated highway and rail line from central Bangkok to Don Mueang International Airport.

Construction started in 1990, but was suspended by the first government of Anand Panyarachun in 1992, and was finally halted by legal acrimony in 1997 with only 10-13% complete. The project was cancelled in 1998. Due to its resemblance to standing stones, it was comically nicknamed "Thailand's Stonehenge". As of 2024, some idle pillars are still standing and litigation about the project continues.

== History ==
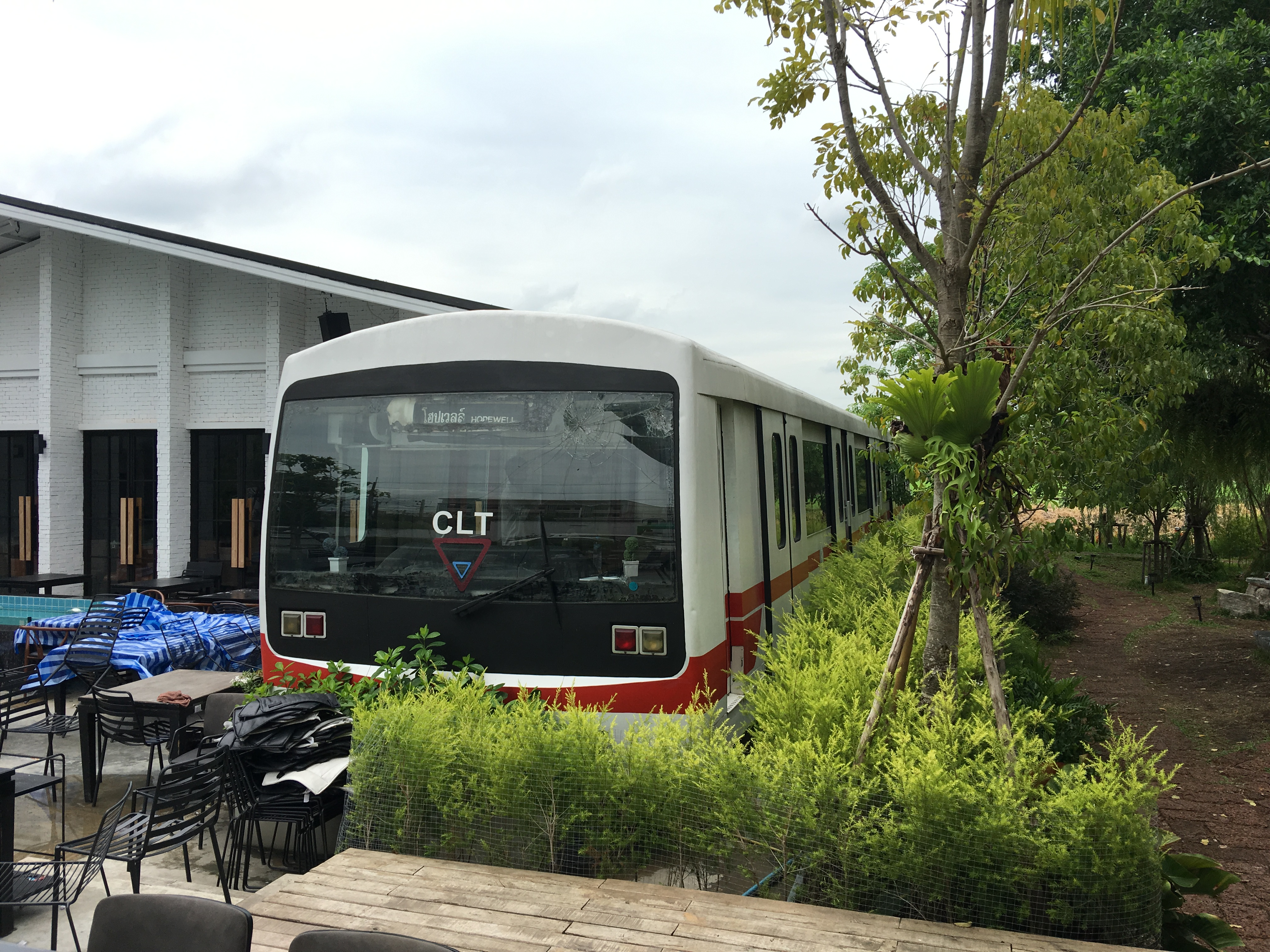
Model of the BERTS train to be used in the project

In 1986, Hopewell Holdings investigated and developed a transport system that could be privately funded and provide the people of Bangkok with a mass transit railway similar to that in operation in Hong Kong.

The concept of this integrated system was produced with input from Arup and presented to the Ministry of Transport and Communications and the State Railway of Thailand. Following negotiations and an eventual international tender, Hopewell (Thailand) Ltd. signed a 38-year concession agreement with the SRT and the Ministry of Transportation and Communication (MOTC) to build, own, operate, and transfer (BOOT) the BERTS system, with Arup as a leading member of the design team. Arup was appointed as the consultant for the system in 1991.

The 80 billion baht (US$3.2 billion) project was approved on 9 November 1990, without a feasibility study or clear timeline for completion, as a joint project of the Thai Ministry of Transport, the SRT, and the Thai subsidiary of Hopewell Holdings of Hong Kong. There were to be three phases: the first a north–south line from Hua Lamphong Railway Station, Bangkok's main train station, to Don Mueang International Airport; the second an east–west line from Taling Chan District to Hua Mak; and the third a spur to the port. Totaling 60 km, all three were to be built on top of existing SRT train lines.

The construction plan is divided into 5 phases, consisting of:

- Phase 1: Yommarat-Don Mueang, with a total length of 18.8 kilometers and a construction period of 4 years, scheduled for completion in December 1995.
- Phase 2: Yommarat-Hua Lamphong-Hua Mak and Makkasan-Chao Phraya River, with a total length of 18.5 kilometers and a construction period of 5 years, scheduled for completion in December 1996.
- Phase 3: Don Mueang-Rangsit, with a total length of 7 kilometers and a construction period of 6 years, scheduled for completion in December 1997.
- Phase 4: Hua Lamphong-Wongwian Yai and Yommarat-Bangkok Noi, with a total length of 6.7 kilometers and a construction period of 7 years, scheduled for completion in December 1998.
- Phase 5: Wongwian Yai-Pho Nimit, and Taling Chan-Bangkok Noi, with a total length of 9.1 kilometers and a construction period of 8 years, scheduled for completion in December 1999.

In 1996, some of the contracts were awarded, such as Balfour Beatty for the track laying, AdTranz for supplying the 172 rail cars, and Siemens for the train depots, stations, and signaling systems. Despite the government's threat to cancel the project, more contracts were awarded in the same year. The railway medium-voltage electrical system comprises 25 kV single-phase traction and 22 kV substation supplies, which are derived from the 230 kV primary network of the electricity supply authority via three bulk supply substations adjacent to the route of the railway. Supplies for the main line stations, the highway, etc. are derived from the community train station substations. The initial CT operation consists of 4 car trains at 3 minute headways, with a maximum capacity of 9 car trains at 2 minute headways. 230 kV was chosen as the standard nominal three-phase voltage available in Thailand on the basis of availability and economics.

Rumors of corruption swirled around the project from the outset. The first part of the project was due to be in operation by December 1995, with the rest completed by December 1999. However, construction ceased in August 1997 during the Asian financial crisis, with only around 10% complete. Gordon Wu of Hopewell blamed slow land acquisition on the Thai government, while Thai officials stated that Hopewell had simply run out of money. Both sides demanded financial compensation and threatened to sue the other for breach of contract, with Hopewell claiming the work had cost it US$575 million. The project was formally terminated by the Cabinet in 1998.

== Physical status ==
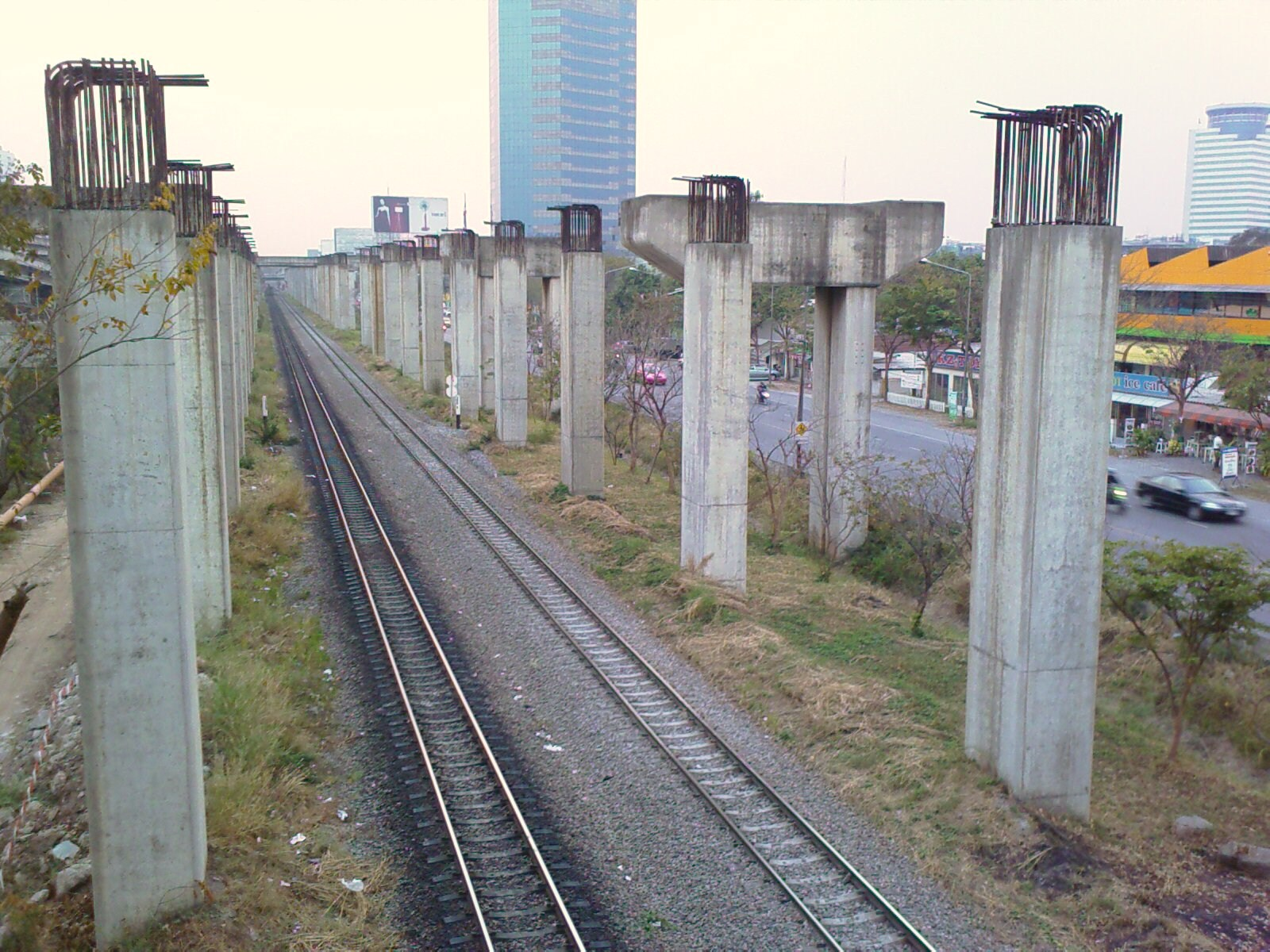
Pillars near Ngam Wong Wan intersection in 2009, along the present alignment of the SRT Dark Red Line

The project left over 1,000 concrete pillars standing idle along the planned routes, described by the Bangkok Post as "a Bangkok version of Stonehenge". Revivals of the project were proposed periodically by both Hopewell and SRT, but were always shot down by the government of then Prime Minister Thaksin Shinawatra. According to an Asian Institute of Technology study, the vast majority of the pillars remain structurally sound and in usable condition, and it has been proposed to use them to build an extension of the BTS Skytrain. Much of the Uttaraphimuk Elevated Tollway on Vibhavadi Rangsit Road parallels the BERTS north–south alignment, with some flyovers since built that obstruct parts of the route.

All of the BERTS east–west line's pillars were demolished from 2005 to 2007 during the construction of the Suvarnabhumi Airport Link, which opened to the public in August 2010.

The alignment of the SRT Dark Red Line covers the rest of the BERTS north–south line, and the project has been described as a "Hopewell revival". A section of the Hopewell structure collapsed onto the main northern line on 1 March 2012. A massive concrete slab 50m by 20m collapsed near Wat Samian Nari temple in Chatuchak District. Demolition of the pillars on the north–south line started in 2013, at a cost of 200 million baht. After repeated delays, the Dark Red Line eventually opened for trial operation on 2 August 2021, 31 years after the construction of the Hopewell Project started.

== Legal status ==
On 23 April 2019, Thailand's Supreme Administrative Court upheld an arbitration committee's ruling in favour of Hopewell, contractor for the 80 billion baht project killed by the government in 1998. The court ordered SRT to pay Hopewell compensation of 11.88 billion baht, plus 7.5% interest per year. The interest, totaling 13 billion baht, brings the total to nearly 25 billion baht, payable within 180 days.

In October 2019, the transport ministry announced that it will seek a reversal of the Supreme Administrative Court's ruling ordering it and the State Railway of Thailand (SRT) to pay compensation to Hopewell. The ministry will file a lawsuit asking the civil court to look into irregularities that the SRT has uncovered concerning Hopewell's registration as a contract competitor. Hopewell may have been ineligible to win the contract from the outset, according to the transport minister.

On 27 October 2020, the Central Administrative Court upheld the original ruling in favor of Hopewell, making it final; however, on 4 March 2022, the Supreme Administrative Court "ruled in favour of the Ministry of Transport and State Railway of Thailand (SRT) request for a retrial".

On 18 September 2023, the "Central Administrative Court [...] overruled [previous ruling], an arbitration tribunal's order for the Ministry of Transport and the State Railway of Thailand" to pay; Hopewell [Holdings] can appeal.

== See also ==
- Lavalin Skytrain – a similar cancelled rail transit in Bangkok
- Jakarta Monorail – a similar cancelled rail transit in Jakarta
- North Luzon Railways – a similar cancelled railway project in Metro Manila and Central Luzon, Philippines
- Narita Shinkansen – a similar cancelled rail transit in Japan
