= Telford Gardens =

Housing estate in Kowloon Bay, Hong Kong

Coordinates: 22°19′29″N 114°12′44″E

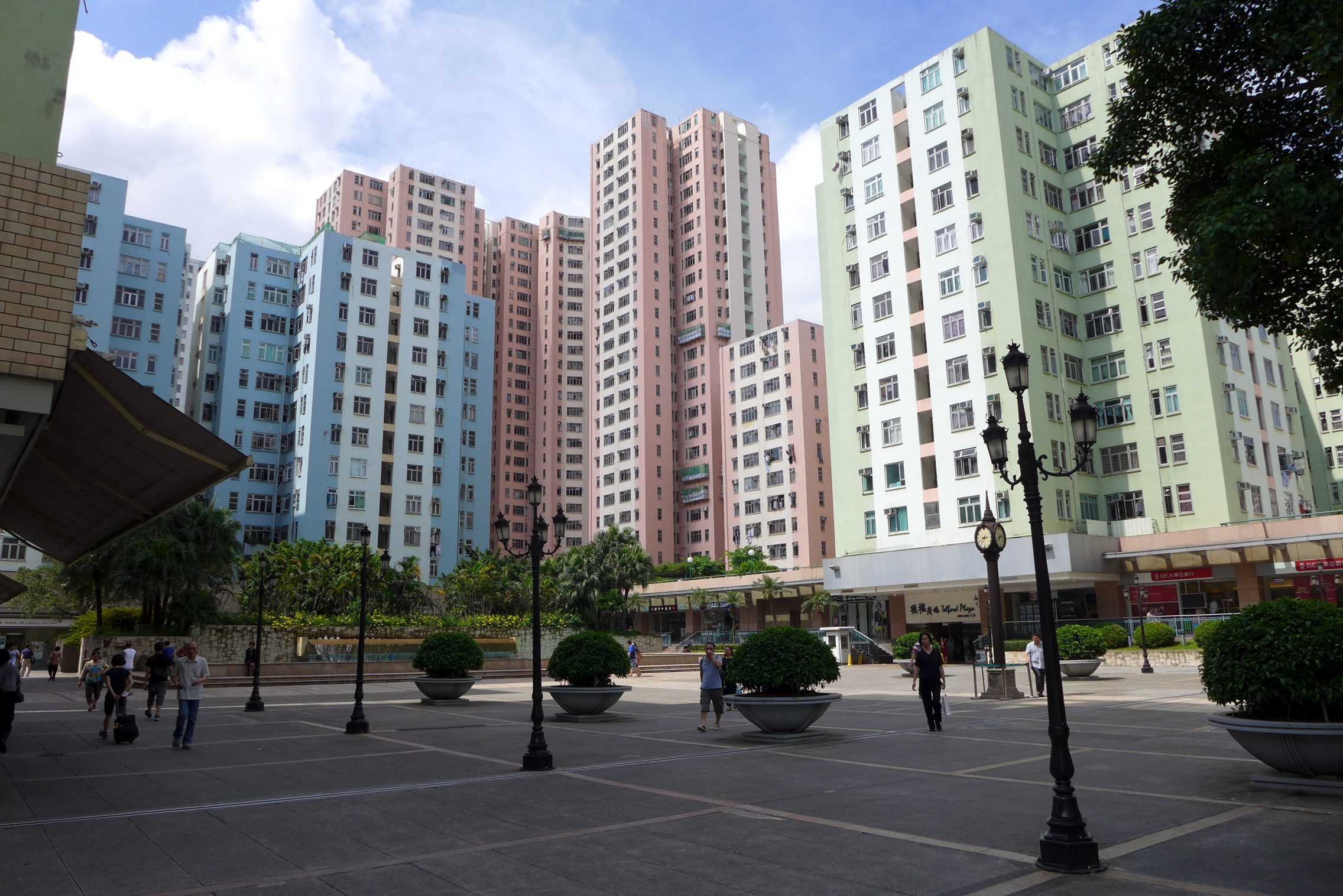

General information
- Location: 33 Wai Yip Street, Kowloon Bay, Kowloon, Hong Kong

Chinese name
- Traditional Chinese: 德福花園
- Simplified Chinese: 德福花园
Transcriptions
Standard Mandarin
- Hanyu Pinyin: Défú huāyuán
- Wade–Giles: Tê^{2}-fu^{2} hua^{1}-yüan^{2}
- IPA: [tɤ̌.fǔ xwá.ɥɛ̌n]
Yue: Cantonese
- Yale Romanization: Dākfūk fāyún
- Jyutping: dak1 fuk1 faa1 jyun4
- IPA: [tɐk̚˥.fʊk̚˥ fa˥.jyn˧˥]

Telford Gardens (Chinese: 德福花園; Cantonese Yale: Dākfūk fàyún) is a private housing estate located above the MTR Kowloon Bay Depot and alongside Kowloon Bay station in Kowloon Bay, Hong Kong. It was jointly built by Hang Lung Properties and Hopewell Holdings. Being the first property development project of the Mass Transit Railway, the estate is now managed by the corporation.

The estate comprises a total of 41 residential blocks completed between 1980 and 1982, organised by alphabetical order (from A to U), with only Block L not sharing its lobby with a twin block. There are 4,992 flats in total. At first, many flats in Blocks R, S and T were bought by the Hong Kong Government as houses for its firemen and policemen, as well as by airlines for their employees as the Estate is near the former Kai Tak Airport, closed 1998. Most of these properties are now back on the private market.

== Nearby amenities and facilities ==
Telford Plaza 德福廣場

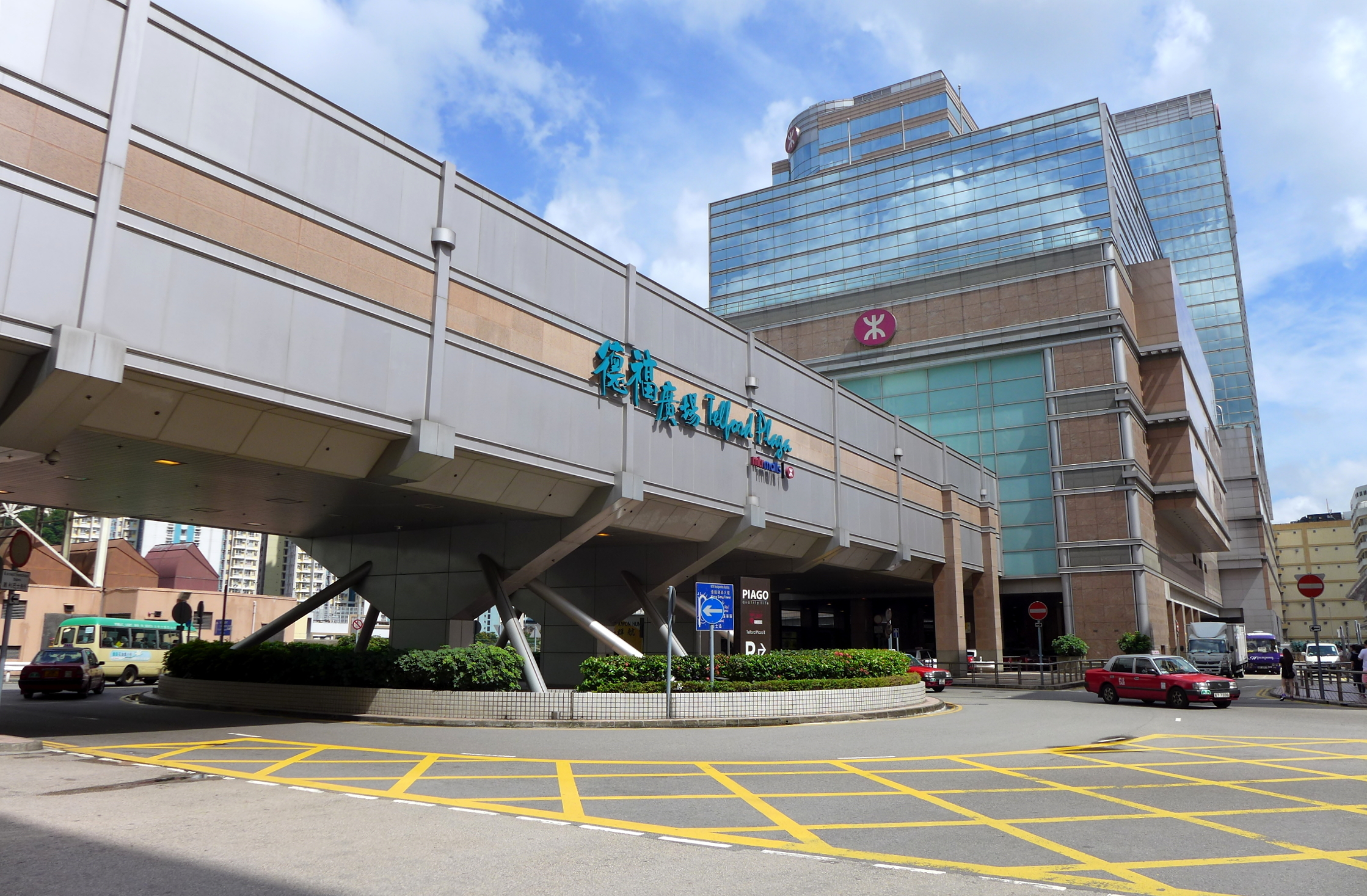
- Opened: 1980
- Renovated: 1997, 2007

=== Telford Plaza ===
Telford Plaza I is one of the largest shopping centres in Kowloon Bay. It was completed in 1980, and substantially renovated in 1997 and 2007. In 1990s, the MTR Headquarters Building was demolished, and Telford Plaza II was constructed in its site. In 2017, the phase 2 of the plaza was expanded 3,400 square meters to 7th and 8th floors, originally used as MTR's training center. The complex includes shops, banks, restaurants, a cinema, a department store, electronics chain stores, etc.

Telford Plaza is the main route between Telford Gardens, the Kowloon Bay MTR and the Kowloon Bay industrial area. Thus, the air-conditioned pathways through the shopping mall are open 24 hours.

=== Podium ===
The podium area has a park with a resting area, fountain, plaza and fish/turtle pond; the second level of the podium has a children's playground and is also the entrance area for many blocks. Telford Garden has a clubhouse, which has swimming pools, tennis courts, a fitness centre, etc. It was originally open to the public but is now members only as of 2006; fees are HK$10,000 to join and then HK$2,000 per year.

The Kowloon Bay Depot is located under Telford Garden and is the largest depot in the entire MTR system. It houses trains serving on the Kwun Tong line and was also intended to be linked to East Kowloon line as there was no suitable space for a dedicated depot for that line. MTR Metro Cammell EMU trains and (prior to 2009) MTR Rotem EMU trains are stored and maintained here. In 2003 and 2004, some M-Train sets were refurbished at Kowloon Bay Depot for eventual service on the Disneyland Resort line.

== Incidents ==
=== 1979 tragedy ===
On 22 July 1979, a serious industrial accident occurred at Block C of Telford Gardens. Six workers were riding a crane to the roof of the building when it suddenly plunged from the seventh or eighth floor, killing all six.

=== 1998 mass murders ===
On 21 July 1998, five women died in a flat on the 5th floor of Block C after drinking "holy water" that had mixed cyanide. The murderer was sentenced to death in mainland China.

=== 2019 protest ===
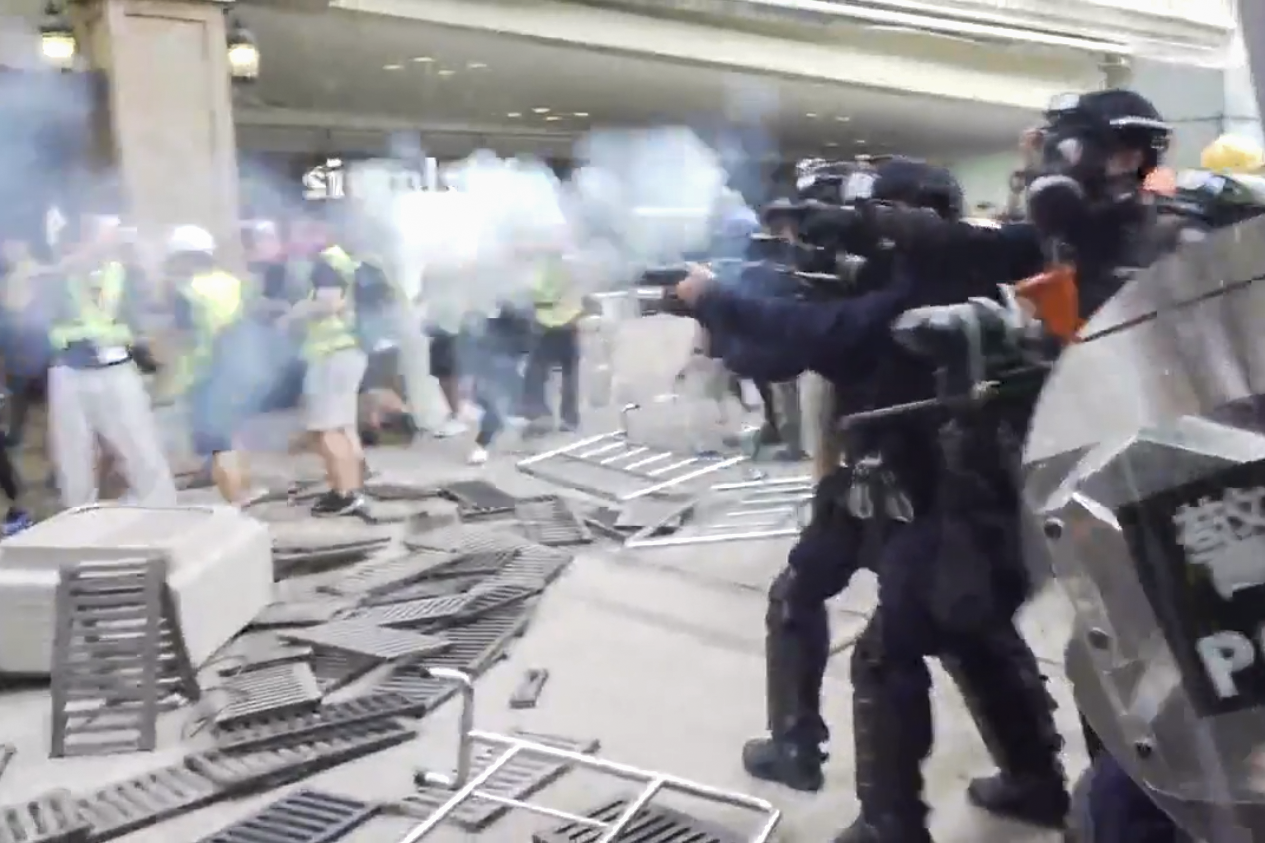
Police Special Tactical Contingent fired tear gas on the platform outside the MCL Cinema

On 24 August 2019, after the Anti–Extradition Bill protest in East Kowloon, demonstrators clashed with the police. The protesters later retreated from Telford Plaza and Telford Gardens. The police's Special Tactical Contingent fired multiple rounds of tear gas in Telford Gardens. Unarmed residents said that Telford Gardens is a residential area, and that the firing of tear gas scared children.

== Gallery ==
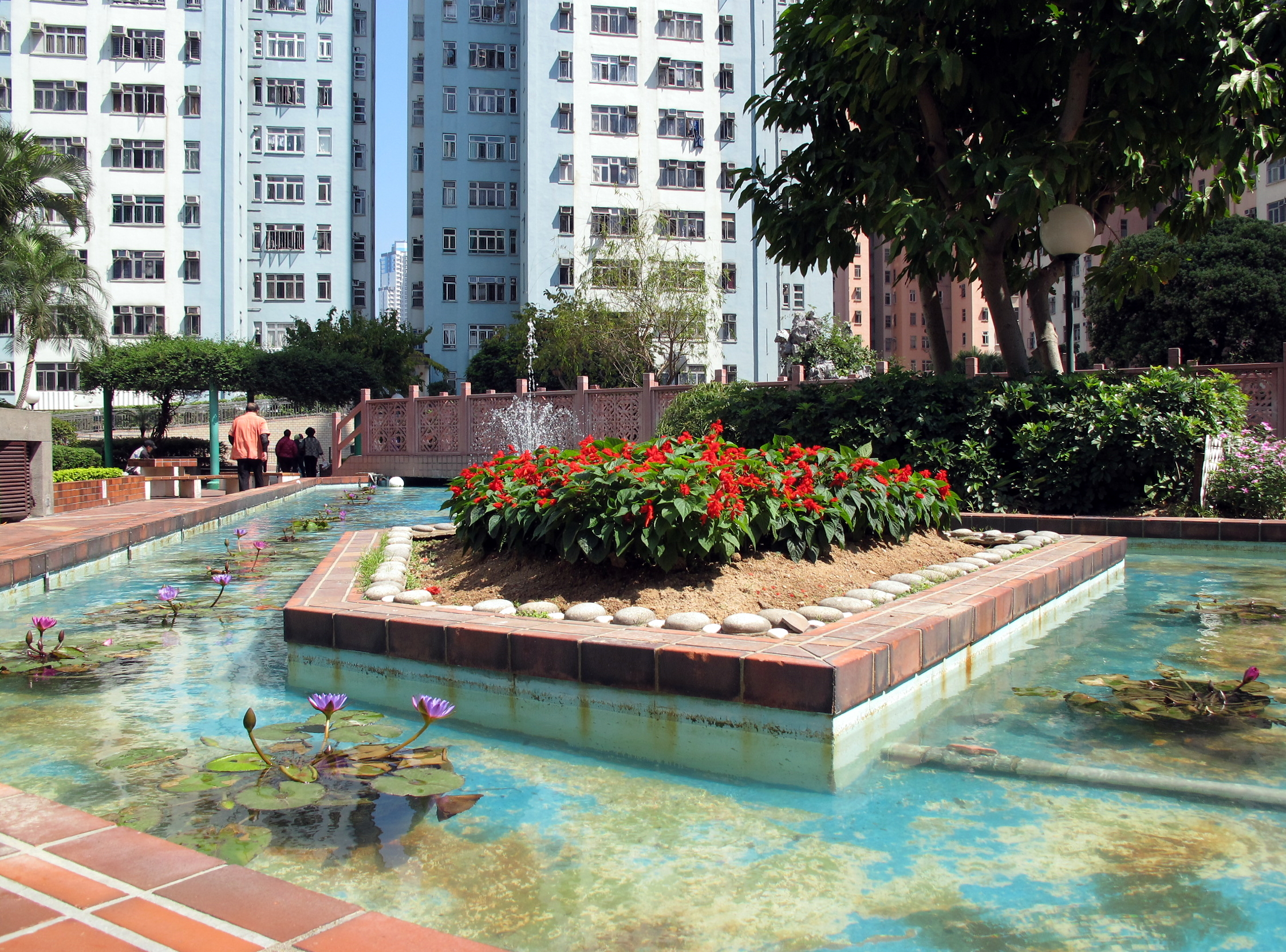
Garden Ponds

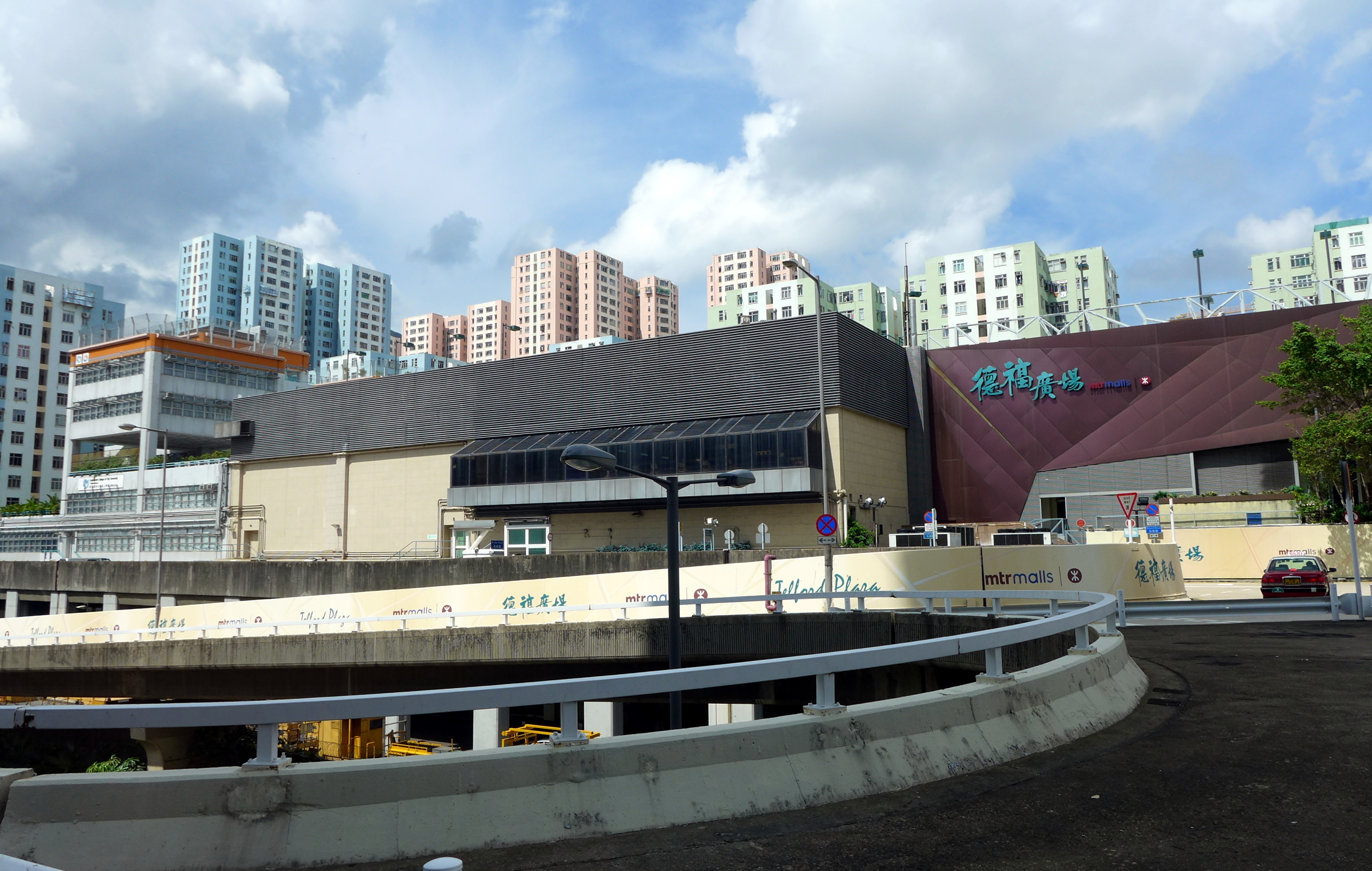
The clubhouse (left) after renovation of the outer wall in July 2008 and MCL cinema (right)

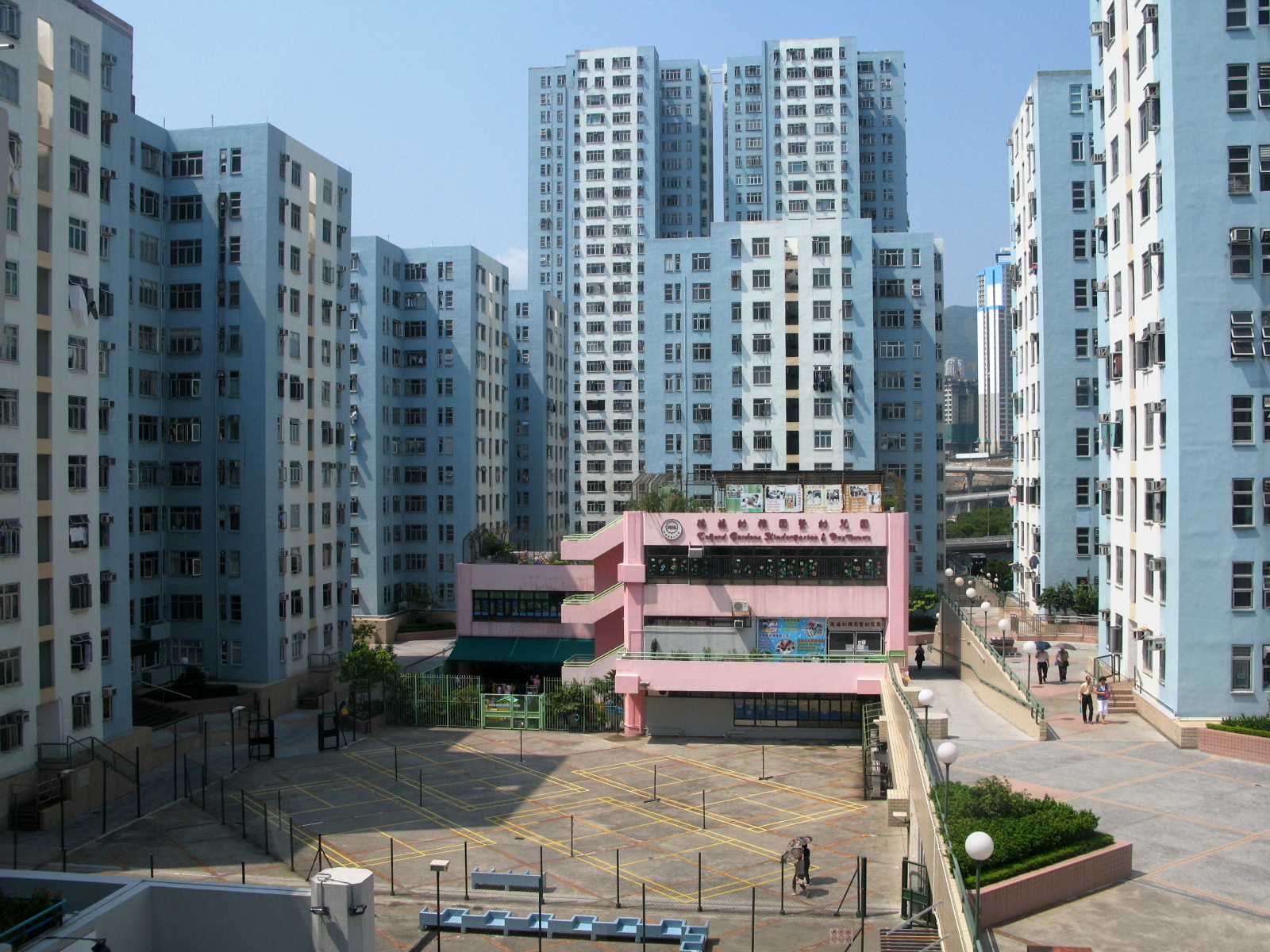
Kindergarten inside Telford Gardens

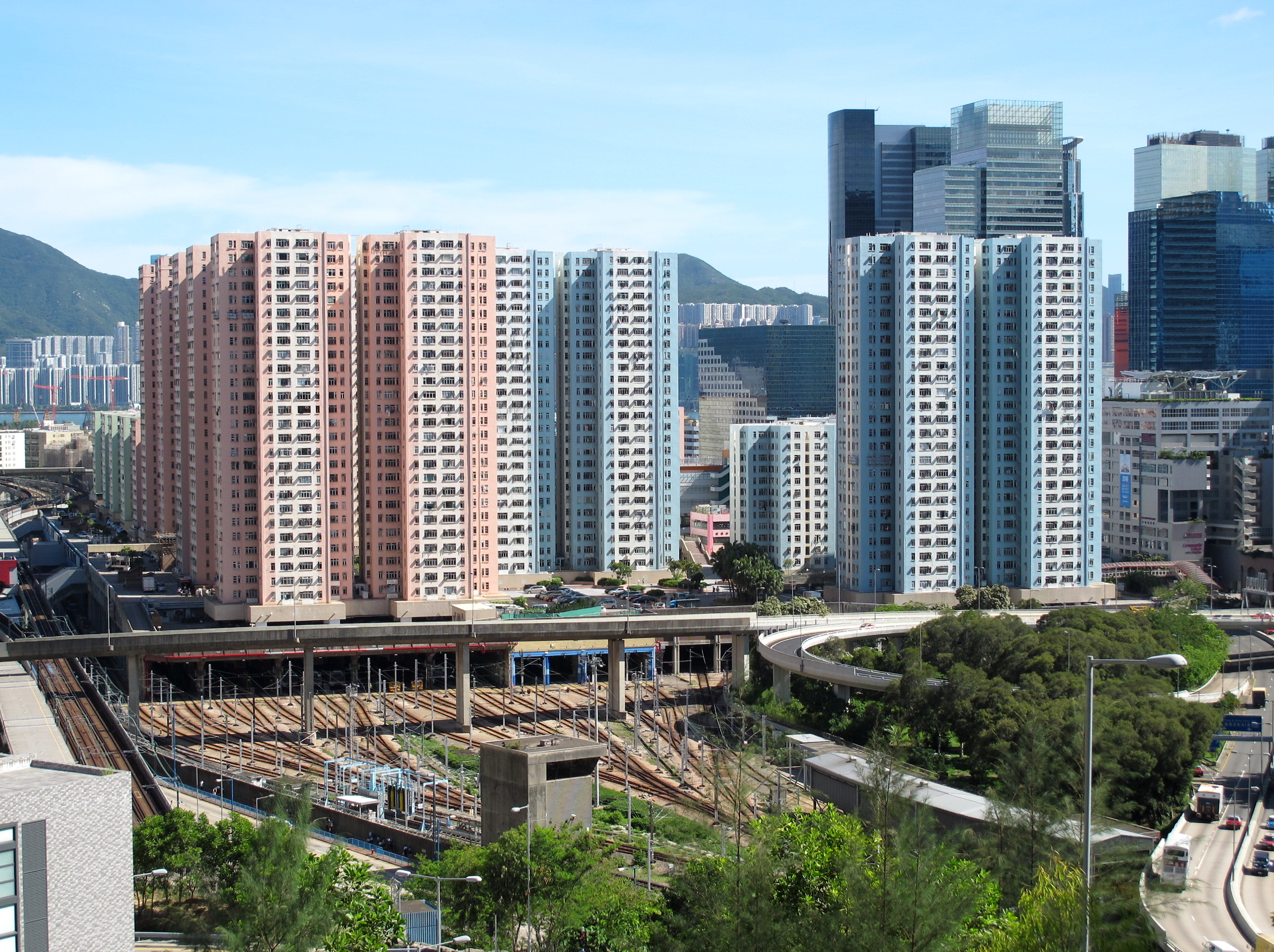
Aerial view of Kowloon Bay Depot from Choi Tak Estate

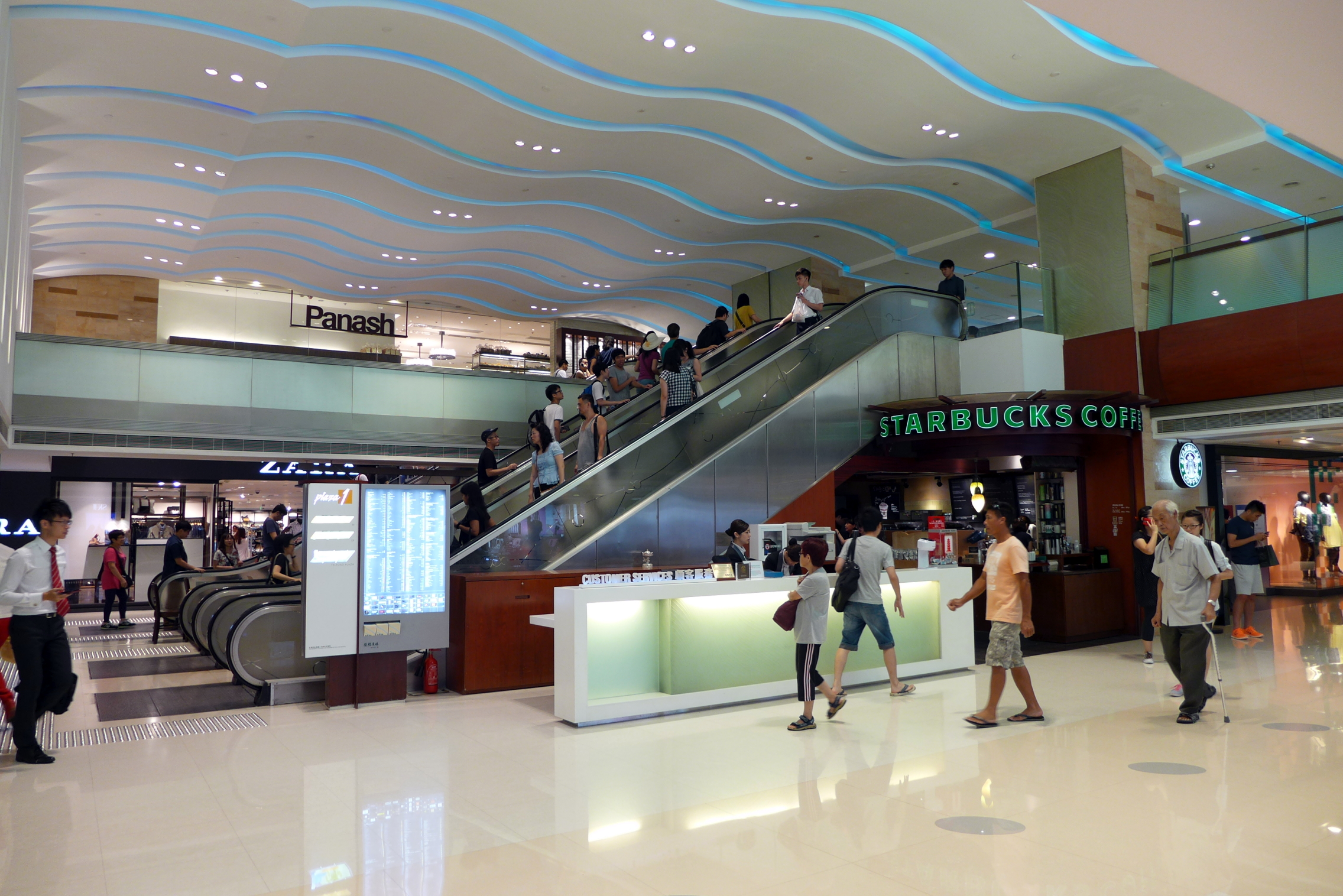
Telford Plaza Phase 1

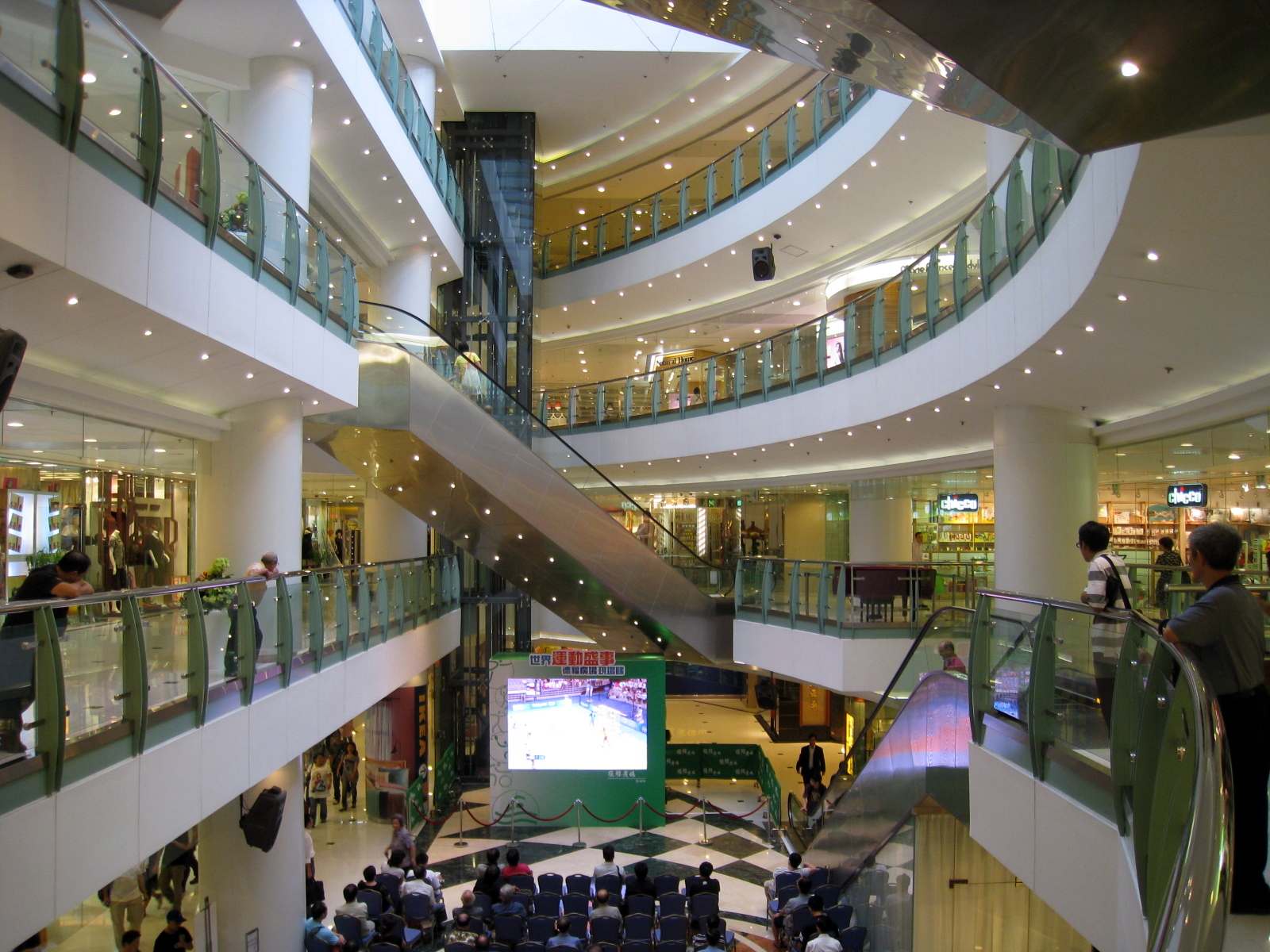
Telford Plaza Phase 2 Atrium

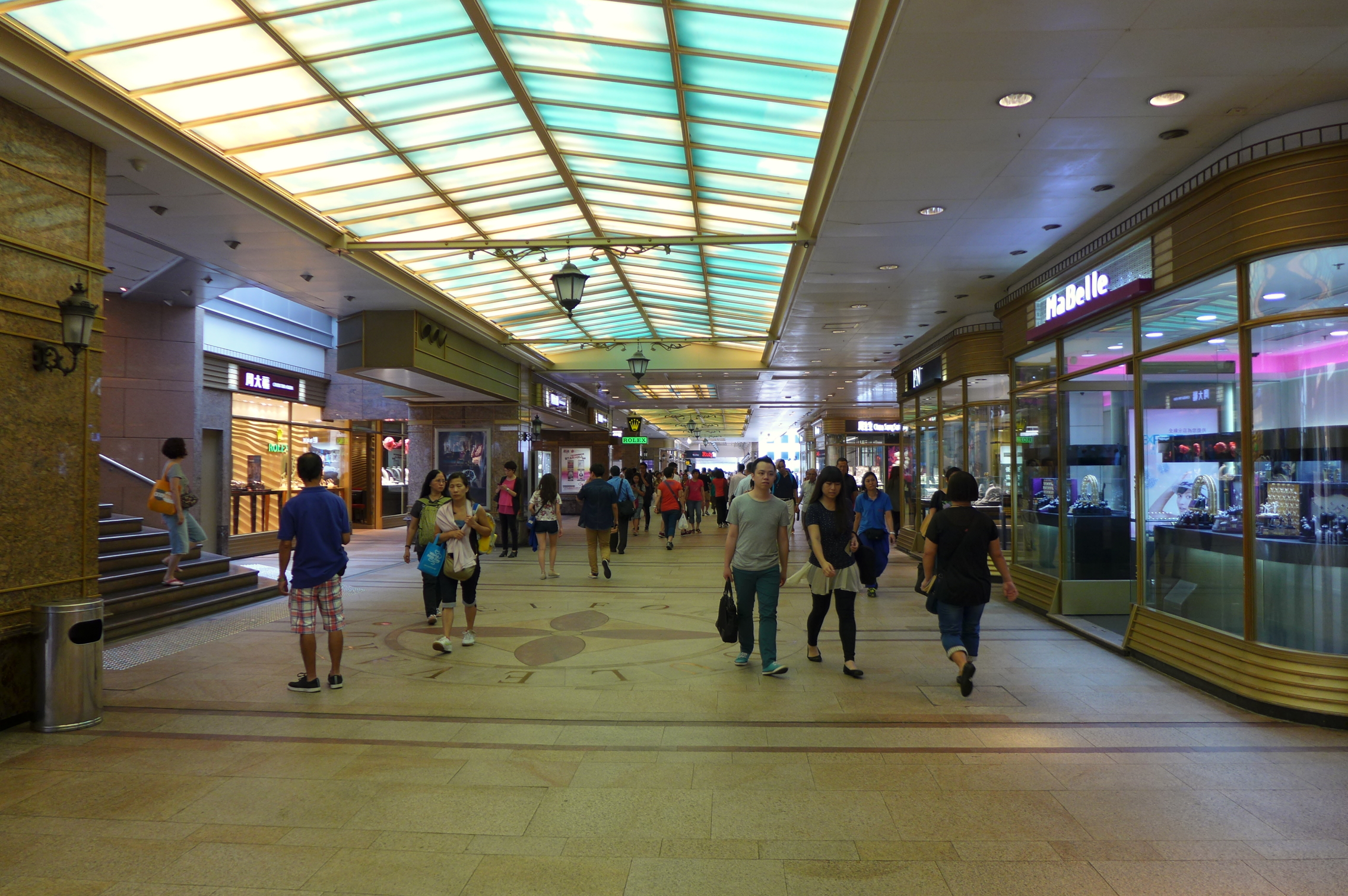
Telford Boulevard

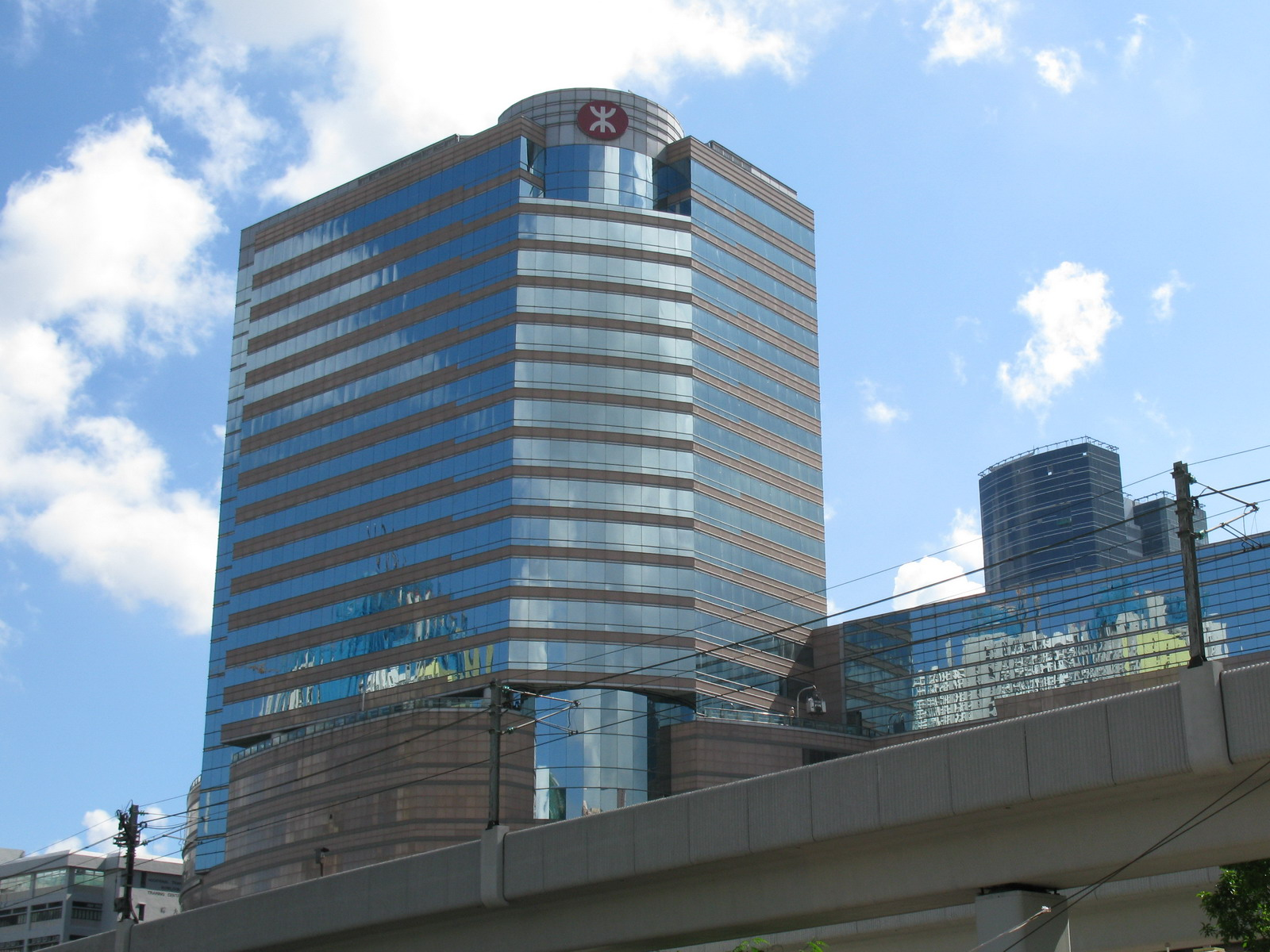
MTR Headquarters Building
