= Hantec Group =

Hong Kong financial company

- Native name: 亨達集團
- Company type: Public company
- Traded as: SEHK: 111
- Industry: Financial services
- Founded: 1990; 36 years ago in Hong Kong
- Founders: Tang Yu Lap
- Headquarters: Hong Kong, China
- Subsidiaries: Hantec Financial; Hantec Bullion; Hantec Markets (V) Company Lmited; Hantec Markets
- Website: www.hantecgroup.com/en

Hantec Group (traditional Chinese: 亨達集團; simplified Chinese: 亨达集团) is a multinational financial services company based in Hong Kong. It was established by Tang Yu Lap in 1990.

The company's services including enabling customers to trade bullion, stocks, and futures and to do margin-based foreign exchange and contract for difference trading.

== History ==
Hantec Group was founded in Hong Kong in 1990 by Tang Yu Lap. Tang made his first visit to Taiwan in 1995, where he established relationships with people in Taiwan's banking sector and with politicians. In 1999, Hantec established Taiwan's sole privately owned foreign exchange market, Cosmos Foreign Exchange. Hantec had an initial public offering on the Hong Kong Stock Exchange in July 2000, generating HK$74.75 million from nearly 75 million shares sold. That month, the company had a market capitalisation of HK$300 million.

By 2001, the company had opened six branches in Hong Kong and offices in Beijing, Manila, Paris, Taipei, and Tokyo. Hantec was unprofitable in 2002 owing to the poor market conditions during the SARS outbreak. Despite decreases in foreign exchange commissions in 2003, the company became profitable that year. As the market recovered, consumers increased trading activity on Hantec's platform bringing it increased commissions. That year, the company was the sponsor for an HKSE IPO.

== Services ==
Hantec offers financial services including insurance, corporate finance, fund management, and margin-based foreign exchange and contract for difference trading. It enables customers to trade bullion, stocks, and futures.
