= Shenzhen Investment Holdings Bay Area Development =

Shenzhen Investment Holdings Bay Area Development (simplified Chinese: 深圳投控湾区发展有限公司; traditional Chinese: 深圳投控灣區發展有限公司), SEHK: 737, SEHK: 80737, is a Chinese infrastructure development company listed on the Hong Kong Stock Exchange. It was formerly Hopewell Highway Infrastructure Limited (HHI; Chinese: 合和公路基建有限公司), the highway unit of Hong Kong-listed conglomerate Hopewell Holdings Ltd controlled by Hong Kong tycoon Gordon Wu. It is now currently controlled by the Shenzhen Expressway Corporation Limited, with the current chairman and executive director being Xiangwen Liao.

The company had interests in two toll road projects in China, including the Guangzhou-Shenzhen Expressway, which links the capital of the province of Guangdong to the Hong Kong-Shenzhen border, and another that runs from Guangzhou to Zhuhai.

It raised HK$3.01 billion (US$385.9 million) from its IPO in early August 2003.

On 11 January 2022, Shenzhen Expressway Corporation Limited, a company listed on the Stock Exchange of Hong Kong and Shanghai Stock Exchange became the controlling shareholder of the company. The company was later renamed Shenzhen Investment Holdings Bay Area Development Company Limited.

== See also ==
- List of Hong Kong companies
