= Tai Lin Radio Service =

Hong Kong electrical appliance retail chain

Tai Lin Radio Service Limited
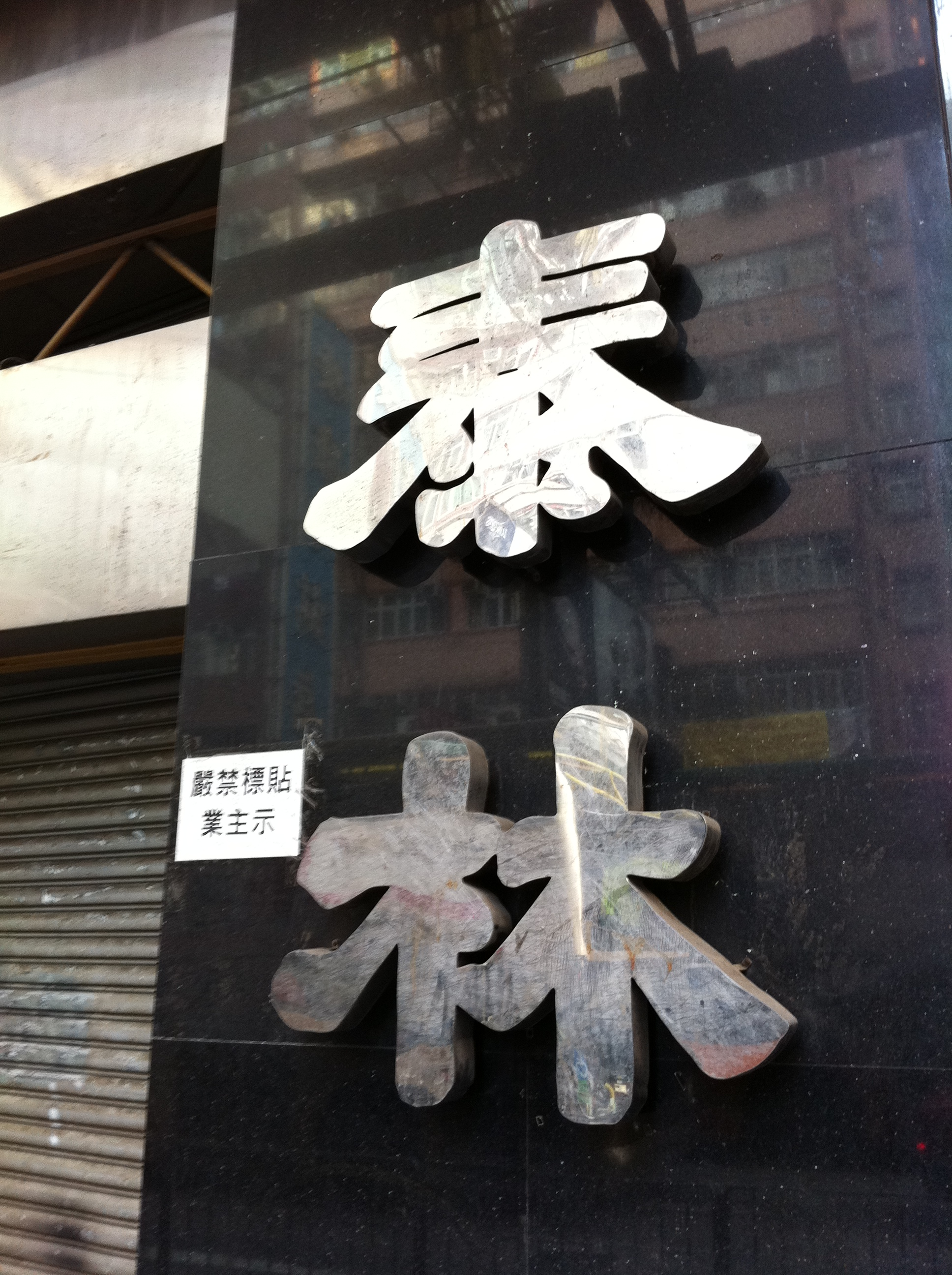
- Company type: Private
- Industry: Retail
- Founded: 1946
- Defunct: 2008
- Headquarters: Hong Kong, China
- Number of locations: 13
- Products: Electrical appliances Home theatre
- Number of employees: 260 (Oct 2008)

Tai Lin Radio Service Limited
- Traditional Chinese: 泰林無線電行
- Simplified Chinese: 泰林无线电行
Transcriptions
Standard Mandarin
- Hanyu Pinyin: tài lín wú xiàn diàn háng
Yue: Cantonese
- Yale Romanization: Taai làhm mòuh sin dihn hòhng
- Jyutping: Taai3 lam4 mou4 sin3 din6 hong4

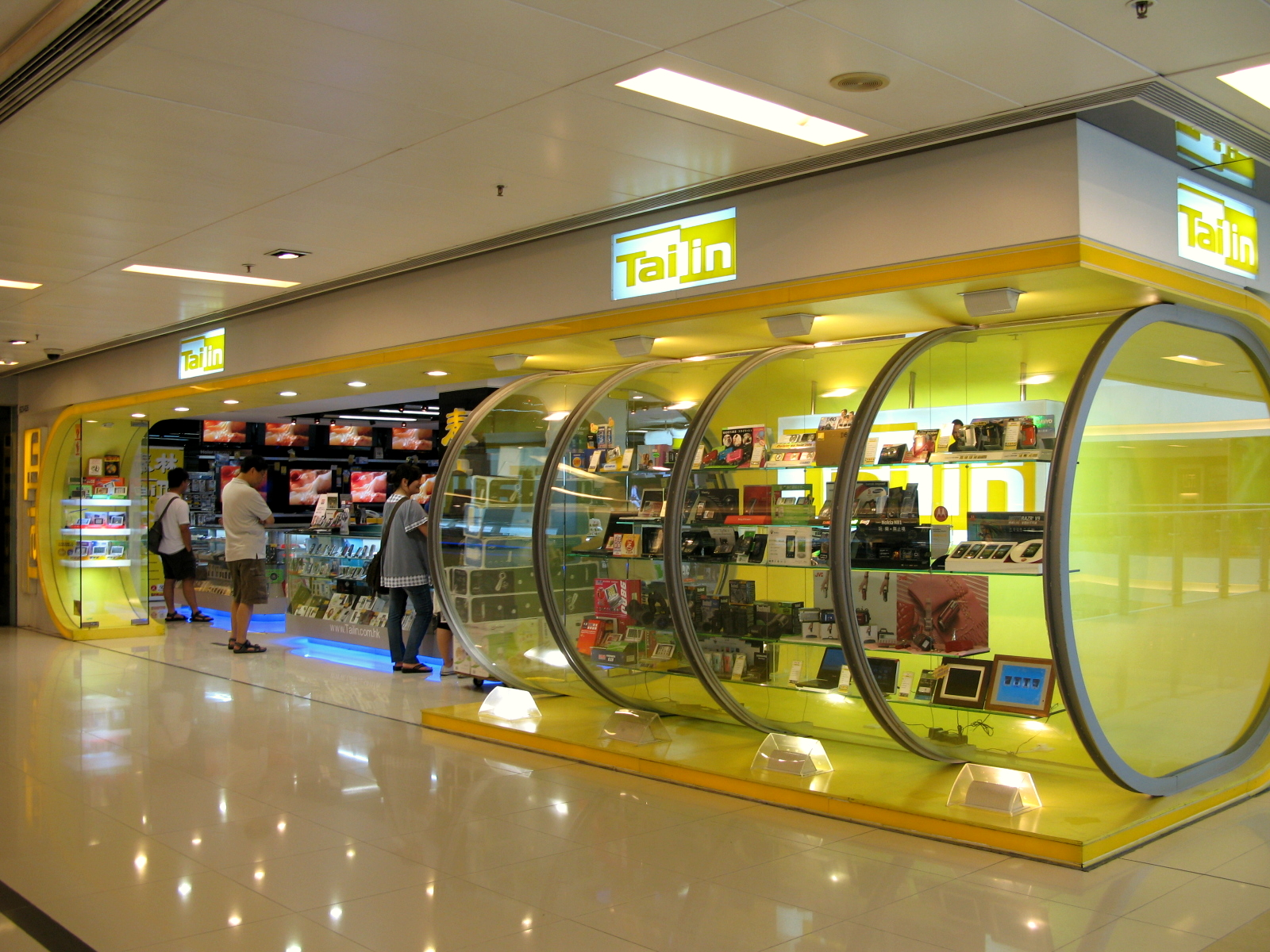
New Town Plaza branch in Sha Tin

Tai Lin Radio Service Limited (Chinese: 泰林無線電行) was one of Hong Kong's largest electrical appliance retail chains. Founded in 1946, it liquidated on 17 October 2008, having thirteen branches altogether throughout the territory at the time.

== History ==
In 1946, Tai Lin Radio Service Limited was established. Tai Lin opened its first store at 309 Nathan Road, Yau Ma Tei, primarily selling radio sets. Since then, it rapidly developed its servicing, management and retail services, besides including tape recorders, gramophones and amplifiers into its line-up. In 1957, Tai Lin became the first electrical appliance store to introduce stereo Hi-Fi to the Hong Kong market.

In the population boom of the 1960s, Tai Lin expanded its product line to television sets, refrigerators, washing machines, air conditioners and cameras, among others, and at the same time, opening new branches to form a retail chain. In 1976, Tai Lin registered itself as a company under the name "Tai Lin Radio Services Limited."

The 1980s and 1990s were defined as Tai Lin's "golden age." The chain has spent HK$50 million in 1989 to refurbish its existing branches. In addition to three stores in Mong Kok and To Kwa Wan, Tai Lin made its proactive expansion throughout the Hong Kong market with new stores in Kwun Tong, Sha Tin, Causeway Bay et cetera. At its peak in 1997, Tai Lin had 13 stores altogether.

After 62 years in existence, Tai Lin failed due to the 2008 financial crisis, affecting 260 personnel from thirteen branches.

== Stores ==
The following are all of Tai Lin's stores at the time of its closure:

Hong Kong Island

- Times Square
  - Shop 905B-906, 9th Floor
  - Shop 815-816, 8th Floor
- Unit 2015–2016, Podium Level 2, IFC Mall, Central
- Shop 127-128, 1st Floor, Island Place, 51 Tanner Road, North Point

Kowloon

- Unit 309 -310, Level 3, Ocean Centre, Harbour City, Tsim Sha Tsui
- Shop G52, Ground Floor, Telford Plaza I, Kowloon Bay
- Basement, Sim City, Mong Kok
- Ground Floor, 310 - 312 Nathan Road, Jordan
- Ground Floor, Honour Building, To Kwa Wan Road, To Kwa Wan
- Ground Floor, 32B, Mut Wah Street, Kwun Tong

New Territories

- Unit 623-626, Level 6, New Town Plaza, Phase 1, Sha Tin
- Shop G33-34, Ground Floor, The Edge, 9 Tong Chun Street, Tseung Kwan O
- Shop G04 Ground Floor, The Edge, 9 Tong Chun Street, Tseung Kwan O
- Ground - 1st Floor, Chow's Building, 4 Shiu Wo Street, Tsuen Wan
- Shop G30-G33 & G35, Ground Floor, Tuen Mun Town Plaza, Phase 1, 1 Tuen Shing St, Tuen Mun
- Shop A-B, Ground Floor, 171 Castle Peak Road, Yuen Long
