= Gordon Wu =

Hong Kong businessman (born 1935)

- Traditional Chinese: 胡應湘
- Simplified Chinese: 胡应湘
Transcriptions
Standard Mandarin
- Hanyu Pinyin: Hú Yìngxiāng
Yue: Cantonese
- Jyutping: Wu^{4} Jing^{3}soeng^{1}

Sir Gordon Wu Ying-sheung, KCMG (Chinese: 胡應湘; born 1935, Hong Kong) is a Hong Kong businessman. He is the chairman of the board of Hong Kong-listed Asian infrastructure firm Hopewell Holdings Ltd.

== Background ==
Wu attended Wah Yan College, a Jesuit secondary school in Hong Kong. After finishing secondary school he registered in 1953 at the University of Manitoba and studied engineering, then transferred to Princeton University and graduated with a Bachelor of Science in Engineering (BSc.Eng.) in 1958, and currently serves as a trustee.

As one of the founders of Hopewell, he was the managing director from 1972 to 2002. In January 2002, he retired as the managing director of the company but remains as chairman of the board. He was responsible for Hopewell's infrastructure projects in mainland China and Southeast Asia and has been involved in the design and construction of many buildings and development projects in Hong Kong and mainland China. He is also the chairman of Hopewell Highway Infrastructure Limited, subsidiary of Hopewell listed in August 2003, and an independent non-executive director of i-Cable Communications Limited.

In 1984, Wu donated US$5 million worth of his company shares to Princeton University and formed a charity fund. Wu also pledged US$100 million to the university, a sum he planned to make available for university use in 2008, on the occasion of his 50th reunion. In a talk given in October 2006, however, Wu revealed intentions of making the contribution available to the university sooner. He completed this pledge, with the last payment in 2006–2007.

He is Chairman of the Council of the Hong Kong Polytechnic University.

== Business ==
Wu has been an advocate for more than two decades for the construction of Asia's largest bridge project linking Hong Kong, Macau, and China's Zhuhai city. The Hong Kong-Zhuhai-Macau Bridge project was given support by the PRC government in August 2003. The bridge traverses two man-made islands, allowing it to go through an undersea tunnel and let shipping pass. The concept is based on the existing Chesapeake Bay Bridge-Tunnel in Virginia, United States.

Since the 1980s, Wu has steered Hopewell Holdings towards developing his vision of creating an advanced transport system for China's manufacturing powerhouse in the Pearl River Delta, which includes much of Guangdong Province and makes use of its proximity to Hong Kong to access professional services and logistics.

Wu has predicted that commercial development in Hong Kong will focus upon the growth of four major pillar industries including retailing, tourism, and logistics. He predicts a diminishing role for the property and textiles industries.

Gordon Wu designed the first build-operate-transfer (BOT) project for the China Hotel in 1979, thus "leading the way" into China. Wu and Hopewell went on to build power plants (Shajiao B and C) and other infrastructure projects in China, using the BOT structure.

== Political stance ==
Gordon Wu has spoken out in opposition to the development of democracy in Hong Kong. He joined more than 80 of Hong Kong's richest business tycoons and their heirs apparent headed for Beijing on 26 September 2003 on an annual pilgrimage. The same year, he told the Chinese University of Hong Kong executive MBA programme that he opposed direct elections in Hong Kong which, he believed, would cause many problems. Noting that only 10 per cent of Hong Kong citizens pay taxes, with the remaining 90 per cent receiving subsidies in various forms, e.g., public housing, healthcare, and education, if direct elections were introduced, this group would, with the help of the politicians they had voted in, "get not only free lunches, but free dinners and breakfasts."

In the run up to the December 2005 protest for democracy in Hong Kong, he said that demonstrators are mobs, and democracy is mobocracy. At a meeting attended by then Vice President Xi Jinping in 2010, he stated, "A small number of people ... are against everything the SAR government wants to do and against everything that's from the central government. They are also using such slogans as 'uprising' and 'liberation'. These show they have hidden purposes."

== Affiliations ==
Hong Kong

- Chairman of the Council of Hong Kong Polytechnic University
- Member of Commission on Strategic Development of the Hong Kong SAR
- Member of Hong Kong Logistic Development Council
- Advisor of Urban Renewal Authority
- Member of Hong Kong Trade Development Council
- Vice President of Hong Kong Real Estate Developer's Association

Mainland China

- Member of Chinese People's Political Consultative Conference
- Advisor of Xiamen Special Economic Zone, Guangxi Zhuang Autonomous Region and Qinhuangdao

International

- Member of Business Advisory Council to the International Finance Corporation of the World Bank Group
- Member of APEC Business Advisory Council (ABAC)
- Member of International Advisory Board of the Institute for International Business Communication, Japan

== Honours and awards ==
Wu received several honours and awards:

=== Honours ===
- Knight of the Order of the Crown (Belgium, 1985)
- Knight Commander of the Order of St. Michael and St. George (KCMG) in the 1997 Birthday Honours for services to Export (United Kingdom, 1997)
- Gold Bauhinia Star (GBS) (Hong Kong, 2004)

=== Honorary degrees ===
- Doctor of Engineering (D.Eng.) from the Hong Kong Polytechnic University (Hong Kong, 1994)
- Doctor of Business Administration (DBA) from the University of Strathclyde (United Kingdom, 1994)
- Doctor honoris causa (dr.h.c.) from the University of Edinburgh (United Kingdom, 1994)
- Doctor honoris causa (dr.h.c.) from the University of Manitoba (Canada, 2012)

=== Honorary citizenships ===
- New Orleans, United States
- Guangzhou, PRC
- Shunde, PRC
- Nanhai District, PRC
- Shenzhen, PRC
- Huadu, PRC
- Province of Quezon, the Republic of the Philippines

=== Other awards ===
- Business Man of the Year by South China Morning Post and DHL (1991)
- Asia Corporate Leader by Asia Finance Magazine (1991)
- Among "the Best Entrepreneurs" by Business Week (1994)
- Man of the Year by the International Road Federation(United States, 1994)
- Industry All-Star by Independent Energy (United States, 1996)
- International CEO of the Year by the George Washington University (United States, 1996)
- Leader of the Year in the Business/Finance category by the Sing Tao Daily and The Standard (2003)

== Trivia ==
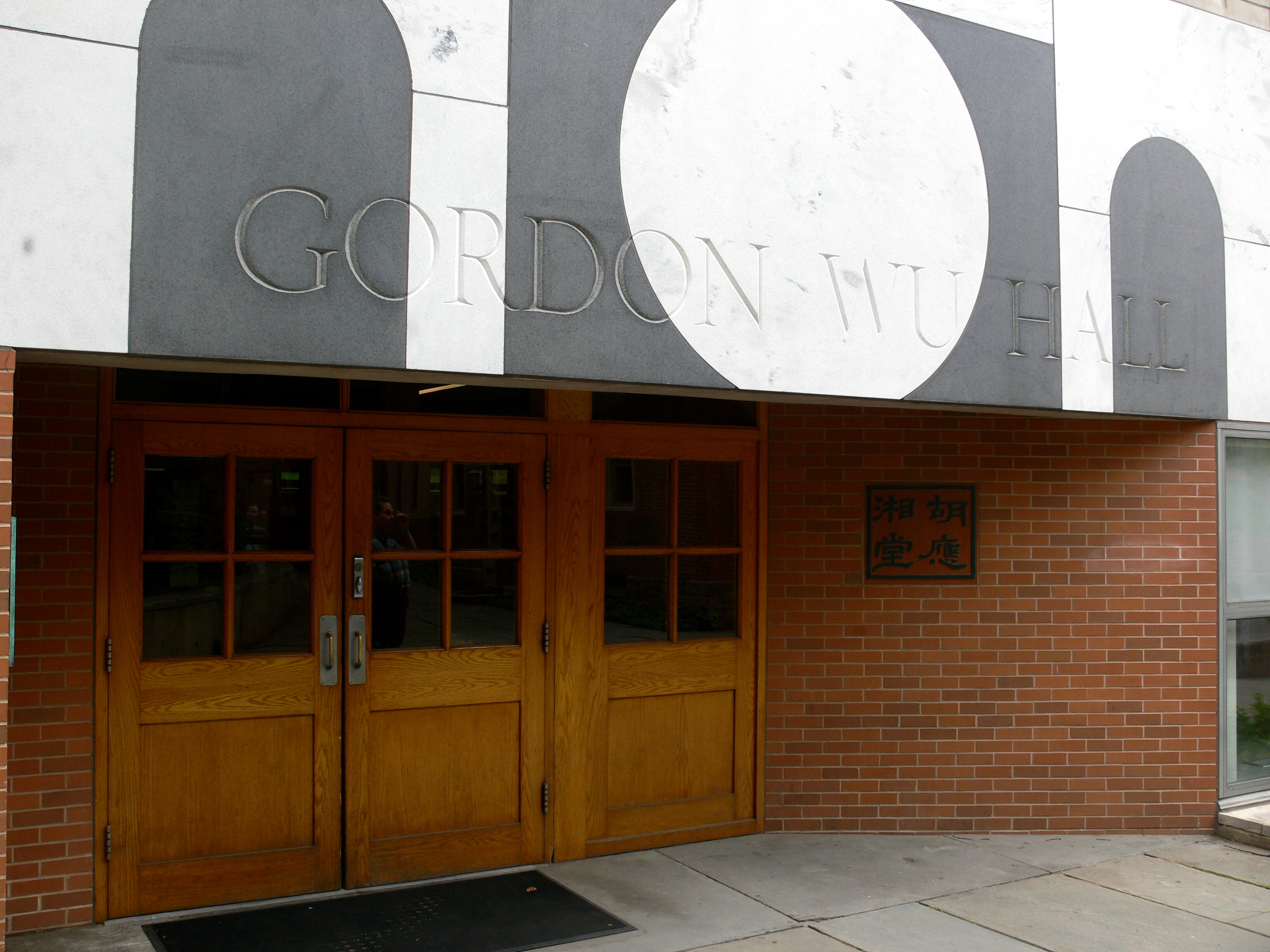
Gordon Wu Hall at Princeton University

- The world's most expensive truffle, a 1.51 kilogram rare White Alba truffle, was sold for €125,000 (Hong Kong Dollar $1,250,000; US$160,000) on 13 November 2006 to Gordon Wu, who planned a charity dinner party at Toscana Restaurant at the Ritz Carlton in Hong Kong. This price beats the previous world record of €95,000 for a 1.21 kilogram White Alba truffle in 2005.
- The dining hall of Princeton University's Butler residential college, built in 1983, is named for Wu. In 1995, Wu pledged a gift of US$100 million to Princeton, US$40 million of that earmarked for graduate fellowships.
- The Science and Mathematics Center at The Taft School in Watertown, Connecticut, is named for Sir Gordon Wu's wife, Lady Ivy Kwok Wu.

== See also ==
- Bangkok Elevated Road and Train System
- Hopewell Centre (Hong Kong)
