= Kuzu Mobile =

Kuzu Mobile is a consumer electronics company headquartered in Hong Kong. It is founded by a Bhutanese Entrepreneur Ugyen Rangdol Kuzu Mobile sells engineered and Chinese contract manufactured Mobile Telephones, Tablet Computers, 3G Datacards and LED Televisions.

Kuzu Mobile has presence in all 20 Dzongkhags in Bhutan. The company has sales presence in the SAARC markets including Nepal, and with Expansion plans in India and Pakistan. On 1 May 2014, Kuzu Mobile was welcomed as the first 'Local Brand' mobile phone in Bhutan by Business Bhutan

Kuzu Ltd.,
Founded	2014
Headquarter	Hong Kong
Website	www.kuzumobile.com

== History ==
Kuzu Mobile was incorporated as Kuzu Tradings Ltd. on 1 May 2014. They started with OEM and ODM mobile phones distribution on 1 June 2014 with a focus on low pricing, in order to compete with international brands and to fulfill the booming demand for low price Mobile and Tablet handsets.

Vision to start kuzu mobile happened in the year 2013. With the introduction of 3G/4G data connections and internet facilities by Bhutan Telecom in all 20 regions of Bhutan, Mr. Ugyen Rangdol saw the booming sales of low price Smartphones. Kuzu Mobile surpassed sales of Nokia, Samsung and Apple in the Bhutanese market by October

== Products ==
Kuzu Mobile products are branded under KPhone. Kuzu Mobile's Kphone Uken features Android 4.4.4 KitKat OS paired by 1.3 GHz Quad core processor. It also includes 1 GB/2 GB RAM,4/16GBGB ROM and Mali 400 GPU along with 5 MP/13 MP rear camera plus 2 MP/5 MP front camera. This dual sim device is enabled with 3G connectivity, WiFi, Bluetooth, GPS and native Google apps. The 5 inched display has got the screen resolution of 450×854 pixels.

* kPhone Uken * kphone Everest* kPhone Power* kVision PC* kTablet
