= Dr. Kong (brand) =

Asian shoe and accessories brand

Dr. Kong Footcare Limited
- Company type: Private
- Industry: Retail
- Founded: 1999; 27 years ago in Hong Kong
- Founder: Ping Lam Kong
- Headquarters: Hong Kong
- Key people: Raymond Ng, General Manager; Alan Kong, Vice General Manager
- Products: Shoes
- Number of employees: 201-500
- Website: https://www.dr-kong.com.hk/

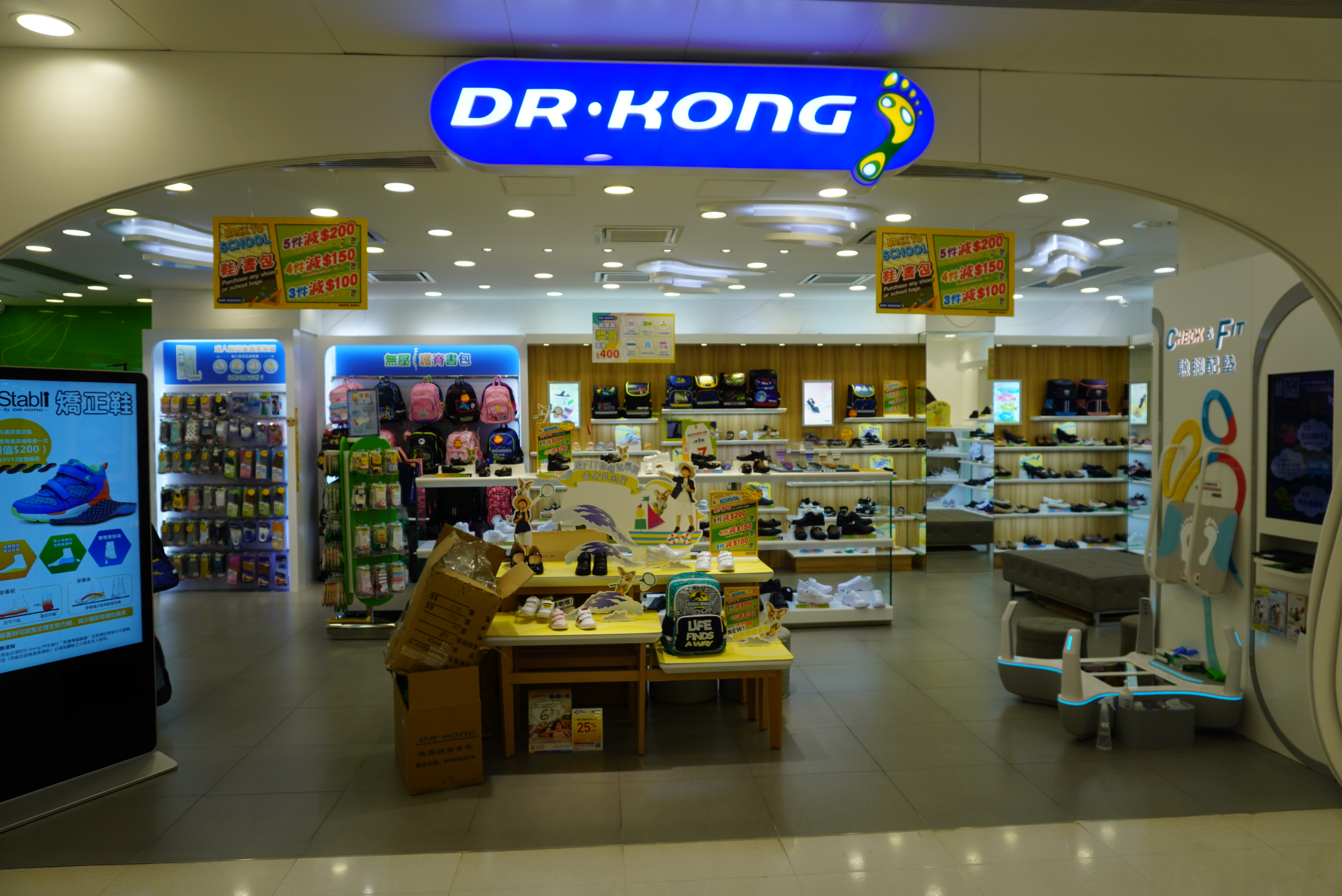
A Dr. Kong's store

Dr. Kong, officially known as Dr. Kong Footcare Limited, is an Asian shoe and accessories brand, based in Hong Kong. The brand was established in 1999 in Hong Kong. It currently has over 800 locations in 10 countries.

== Information ==
The brand is notable for featuring a "Check & Fit" foot test and mat service at various locations operated by professional foot fitness assistants.

The brand offers a wide variety of items including men's and women's shoes, children's and elderly shoes, socks, insoles and backpacks. Their shoes are described as offering orthotic features including a spacious toe box, special designs for insoles and heel cups and has been a first choice for parents concerned about children's shoes. The brand has also been involved in multiple studies to research their products effects.

Upon visiting the store for the first time, a staff member will test the customer's foot and then make a recommendation according to the results. Dr. Kong also recommends shoes from other stores that match their shoe-pads. Returning customers have their feet checked again to test if any improvement had been made.

== Locations ==
- Hong Kong
- Macau
- China
- Singapore
- Philippines
- Uzbekistan
- Mongolia
- Thailand
- Brunei
- Myanmar
- Azerbaijan
- Kazakhstan
