= Hantec Markets =

Financial services company

Hantec Markets Limited
- Industry: Financial services
- Founded: 2009
- Founder: Bashir Nurmohamed and Tang Yu Lap
- Area served: Latin America, Africa, Asia
- Key people: Bashir Nurmohamed (CEO), Nader Nurmohamed (COO)
- Number of employees: 500+
- Website: hmarkets.com

Hantec Markets Limited is a global financial services company established in 2009. It operates as part of the multinational Hantec Group. The company provides trading services, including Contracts for Difference (CFD) trading across multiple asset classes. Hantec Markets reached $725.5 billion trading volumes in a third quarter of 2025.

== History ==
Hantec Markets was founded in 2009 by Bashir Nurmohamed and Tang Yu Lap as part of the expansion of the Hantec Group, which was established in 1990 by Tang Yu Lap in Hong Kong. The Hantec brand has secured several licenses over the years: in 2002, Hantec obtained a license from the Hong Kong Chinese Gold and Silver Exchange Society. In 2007, the group became regulated by the Financial Services Agency in Japan, followed by the acquisition of a license from the Australian Securities and Investments Commission (ASIC) in 2008.

Hantec Markets' initial focus was on providing regulated financial services in the United Kingdom, obtaining its license from the Financial Conduct Authority (FCA) in 2009. It began its global expansion across Latin America, Africa, and Asia in 2015, when the company was incorporated in Mauritius in January, obtaining a license from the Financial Services Commission of Mauritius. The company established key offices in Nigeria in 2017, Thailand in 2019, and Chile in 2022 to expand its services into Africa, Asia, and Latin America respectively.

In 2023, Hantec Markets was recognized with several industry awards.

== Activities ==
Hantec Markets operates as a subsidiary of the Hantec Group. It provides multi-asset CFD trading on desktop, mobile and web for different products, including forex, indices, metals, equities, commodities, and cryptocurrencies. In 2024, Hantec Markets introduced a product that allows traders to engage in CFD pairs trading, offering the ability to trade stocks or indices in pairs. The company also offers Hantec Social, a copy trading platform that allows users to replicate the trades of professional traders, and a mobile trading application Hantec Mobile launched in 2023.

== Operations ==
The Hantec brand is regulated in several key jurisdictions, including the United Kingdom, Australia, Japan, Hong Kong, and Mauritius. The company has established offices in the United Kingdom, Mauritius, Thailand, Nigeria, and Chile. Its global workforce consists of more than 500 employees, with operations across Latin America, Africa, and Asia. Hantec Markets is led by Bashir Nurmohamed as the CEO and Nader Nurmohamed as the COO. Hantec Markets is also engaged in charitable efforts, including supporting the Red Cross during the 2024 floods in Brazil and Thailand.

== Legal and regulatory issues ==
In 2019, an Arabian investor sued Hantec Markets and ICKON Finance in the High Court of Justice in London, seeking about US$442 million from Hantec and alleging that his account had been moved from IKON to Hantec without his consent, that unauthorised fees had been deducted, and that Hantec had closed the account without reasonable notice; the court dismissed the claim in June 2020. In February 2023, the Securities and Exchange Commission of Brazil (CVM) ordered H to suspend offering securities intermediation services in Brazil without CVM authorisation.
