= Hopewell Holdings =

Hong Kong property developer

Hopewell Holdings Limited

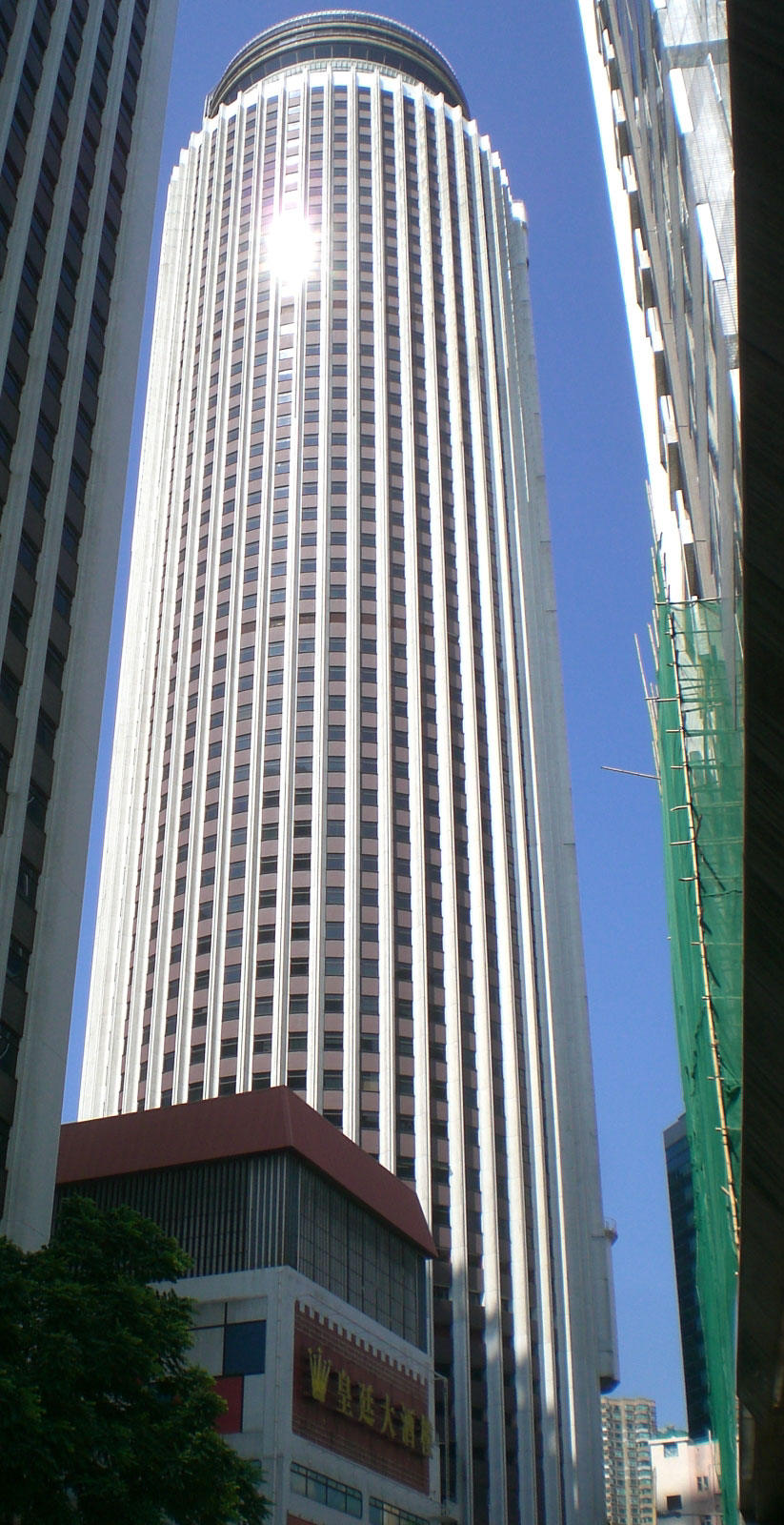
- Headquarters at Hopewell Centre
- Type: Public
- Traded as: SEHK: 54
- Founded: 17 October 1972; 54 years ago
- Headquarters: Hong Kong
- Key people: Gordon Wu
- Subsidiaries: Hopewell Real Estate Agency Limited; Hopewell Hong Kong Properties Limited

Hopewell Holdings Limited (Chinese: 合和實業有限公司) is a major property developer in Hong Kong established in 1972 and headed by Sir Gordon Wu.

== History ==
Hopewell Holdings was established on 17 October 1972. It was listed on the Hong Kong stock exchanges in 1972 and delisted when taken private in 2019.

Hopewell Holding is a holding company for investments in infrastructure projects, property letting, property agency and management, hotel operations and management, restaurant operation and food catering, construction and project management.

Its primary businesses are in Guangdong and Hong Kong. It was one of the first foreign companies to invest in infrastructure projects in China and a pioneer of infrastructure developments across Asia, including the failed Bangkok Elevated Road and Train System (BERTS) project in Bangkok.

It held 68 percent of Hopewell Highway Infrastructure Ltd, which is spun off by Hopewell Holdings and listed on the Hong Kong Stock Exchange in early August, 2003. The company was sold off to Shenzhen Expressway Corporation Limited on 11 January 2022 and renamed Shenzhen Investment Holdings Bay Area Development Company Limited.

As one of the founders of Hopewell Holdings, Wu has been the managing director since 1972. He retired as the managing director of Hopewell Holdings in January 2002 but remains as chairman of the board.

== Hopewell's businesses ==
=== Infrastructure ===
Hopewell participated in the investment of five toll road projects with a total length of 360 kilometres (220 mi), all of which being in the Pearl River Delta region of Guangdong province in mainland China. Four toll road projects are in operation while construction of the 15 km (9.3 mi) Phase I of the Guangzhou-Zhuhai West Superhighway (Guangzhou to Shunde section) commenced in December 2001. All of the projects are in the form of co-operative joint ventures between Hopewell and mainland Chinese partners.

In 1996, PNCC entered into a joint venture with Hong Kong-based Hopewell Holdings to modernize and extend the expressway. Due to financial difficulties, Hopewell partnered with Crown Equities Inc. to form a joint venture, Hopewell Crown Infrastructure Inc. (HCII). HCII suggests extending the expressway through a joint venture from Calamba to Santo Tomas, covering approximately 7.5 kilometers (4.7 mi), and continuing on to Pagbilao for a total distance of 72.1 kilometers (44.8 mi). However, the deal with PNCC was terminated in 2005. The company was negotiating potential ventures with Egis of France, Leighton of Australia, Cise of Spain, MTD Capital of Malaysia, American company Transcore, and SNC Lavalin (now AtkinsRéalis) of Canada prior to Hopewell's departure. MTD and its subsidiary, MTD Equity, agreed to buy out HCII shares and rights from Crown Equities.

- Guangzhou-Shenzhen Superhighway (Guangshen Expressway)
- Guangzhou East-South-West Ring Road
- Shunde Roads
- Shunde 105 Roads
- Guangzhou-Zhuhai West Superhighway
- South Luzon Expressway

== Thailand litigation ==
Hopewell was the lead contractor for the ill-fated Bangkok Elevated Road and Train System. The project commenced in 1990 and was terminated by the Thai government in 1998, only 13% complete. Each side blamed the other for the failure of the project. Both parties sued, and the case has been in litigation since its cancellation. On 23 April 2019, Thailand's Supreme Administrative Court upheld an arbitration committee's ruling in favour of Hopewell, contractor for the 80 billion baht project. The court ordered SRT to pay Hopewell compensation of 11.88 billion baht, plus 7.5% interest per year. The interest, totaling 13 billion baht, brings the total to nearly 25 billion baht (c. US$400 million), payable within 180 days. Thailand's Transport Ministry is battling to overturn the court ruling. "We have found the contract should have been nullified from the very beginning, which means the government is not bound to pay a single baht in compensation," said a ministry spokesman.

== See also ==
- List of Hong Kong companies
- Nam Koo Terrace
