= Pacsafe =

Anti-theft travel goods brand

- Founded: 1998
- Headquarters: Hong Kong
- Products: Anti-theft travel gear
- Parent: Outpac Designs Ltd
- Website: www.pacsafe.com

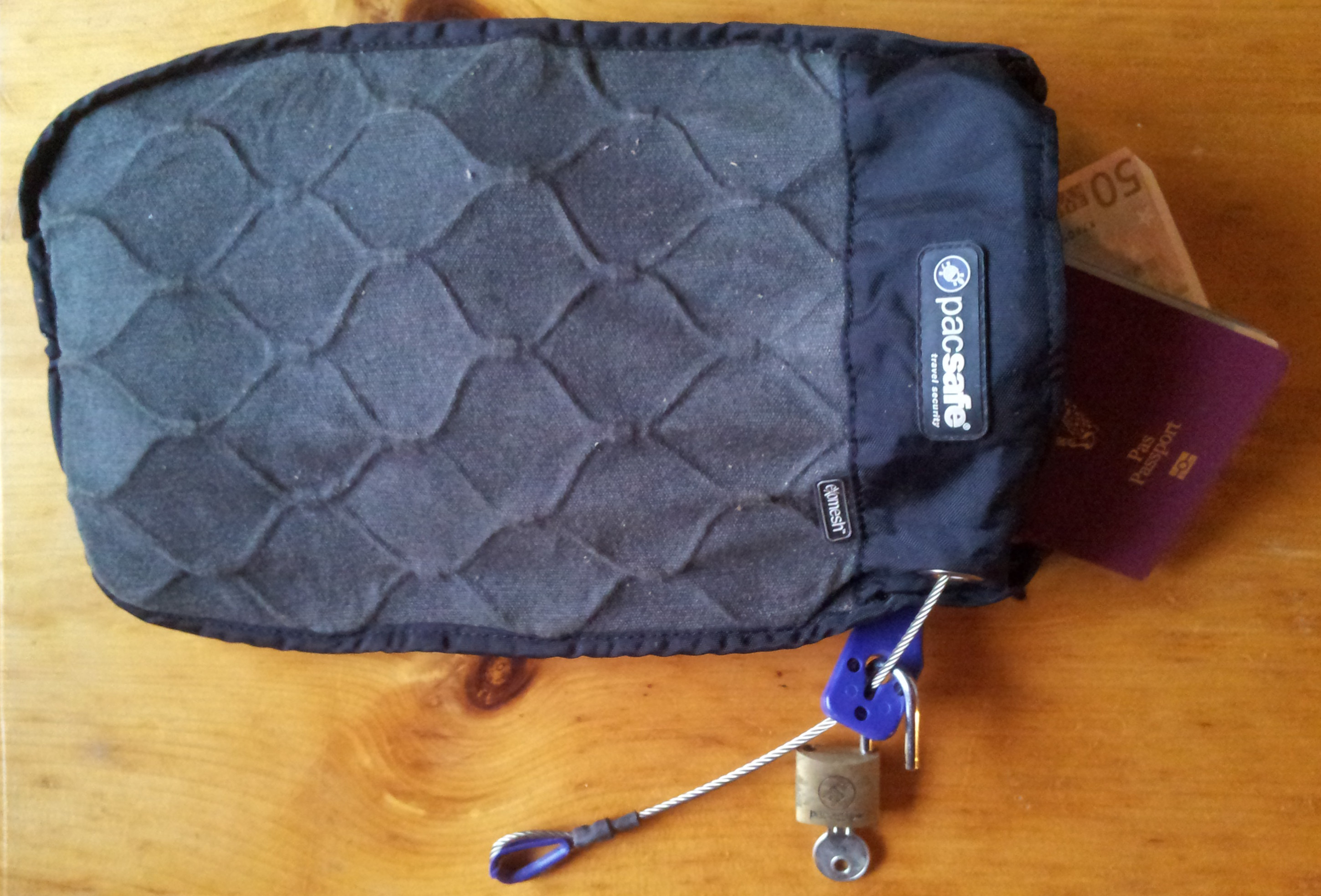
A Pacsafe "portable safe", with integral mesh cage and cable for locking to a fixture

Pacsafe is a brand of travel equipment with emphasis on anti-theft features. Pacsafe is headquartered in Hong Kong with offices in the United States, Germany, and China. The company's range of products include adventure backpacks, urban and leisure bags, women's bags, photography bags, luggage and travel accessories such as straps, cables and locks. The company logo is a turtle with its shell in the shape of a padlock with a mesh cage pattern.

== History ==
Outpac Designs Limited, makers of Pacsafe, was established in 1998 in Hong Kong by two Australians, Rob Schlipper and Magnus McGlashan Their inspiration behind the original Pacsafe product and travel security products came while travelling in South America, where they saw chicken wire put around bags to protect it against theft. Shortly afterwards, they created the slashproof wire cage system Exomesh, the Pacsafe 85L, big enough to enclose an 85-litre backpack, later adding other sizes.

In 2005, Pacsafe locks were made compatible with the Travel Sentry standard used by many international airport security authorities. In 2006, the Citysafe series was added to enhance the women's travel bag lineup. The Lidsafe for motorcycle travel was also introduced.

By 2012, Pacsafe had expanded their range to include adventure backpacks, urban and leisure bags, women's bags, photography bags, luggage and travel accessories that all incorporate anti-theft features.

== Turtle Fund Mission ==
In 2014, Pacsafe founded the Turtle Fund Mission to save endangered marine turtles by providing annual grants to sea turtle conservation projects.

== Industry awards ==
- 1999 – Pacsafe 85L won the Backpacker Magazine Editor's Choice Award
- 2002 – Business Entrepreneurial Award at the AustCham ANZ Australian Business Awards in Hong Kong
- 2007 – Lidsafe won the Motorcyclist Magazine 2007 Product of the Year Award
- 2009 – Travelsafe 100 won the 2009 ILM Awards in the category "Intelligence Design"
- 2010 – RFIDsafe 50 honoured in the travel accessory category at the Outdoor Industry Award 2010
- 2013 − Z-28 heritage anti-theft urban backpack wins international iF product design award in the lifestyle and leisure category
- 2013 – Venturesafe 65L GII wins the Outdoor Industry Award
- 2015 − Pacsafe wins Double iF product design award for the Camsafe Z25 and Duffelsafe AT80 in the sport and leisure category
- 2015 – Intasafe Z400 is the recipient of Carryology's Best Work Messenger award
