= Baleno (clothing retailer) =

Hong Kong clothing retailer

Baleno Group
- Traditional Chinese: 班尼路集團
- Simplified Chinese: 班尼路集团
Transcriptions
Standard Mandarin
- Hanyu Pinyin: Bānnílù Jítuán
Yue: Cantonese
- Jyutping: baan1 nei4 lou6 zaap6 tyun4

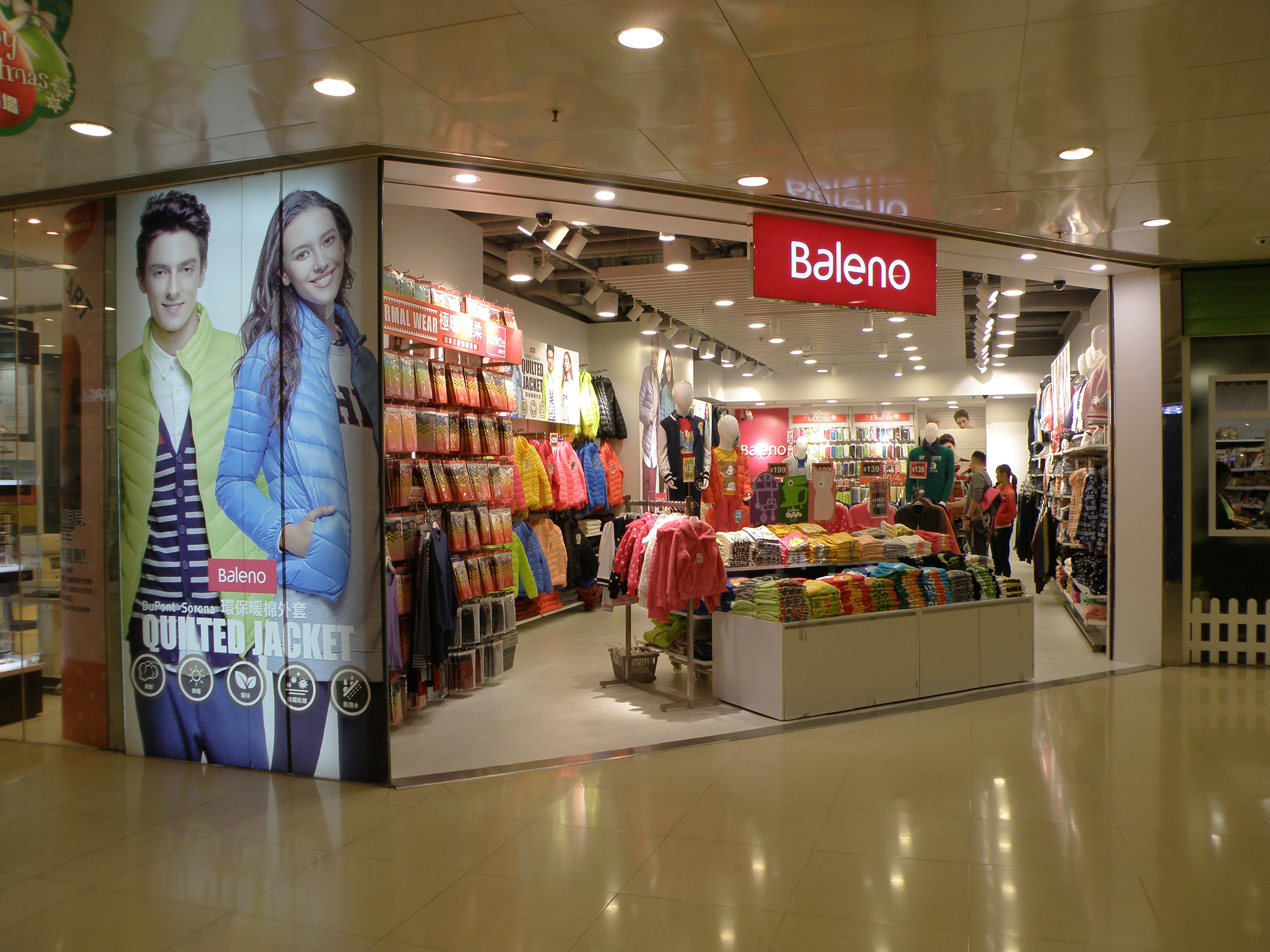
A Baleno shop in Hong Kong

Baleno Holdings Limited (Chinese: 班尼路; pinyin: Bānnílù; Jyutping: baan1 nei4 lou6) is a Hong Kong clothing brand sold in Asia. It is one of the most successful fashion brands to expand into China since opening up its retail markets.

Its head office is on the 10th Floor of the LMK Development Estate (羅氏美光發展大廈) in Kwai Chung.

== History ==
A Hong Kong-listed textile company called Texwinca acquired the Baleno trademark and formed Baleno Holdings Limited in 1996. It expanded rapidly into China, becoming one of the most famous brands there, with 535 shops by 2003. An academic study credited its success to affordable prices, mass appeal, design and good quality.

Former logo

Texwinca currently operates approximately 5,000 stores, with key markets in mainland China, Hong Kong, Taiwan, Malaysia, Singapore, Philippines, Indonesia and the Middle East.

== Locations ==
As of 2016, there were 64 stores in different regions of Hong Kong.

As of 2017, there were 73 stores in Hong Kong. 9 stores located in Hong Kong Island, 28 stores located in Kowloon and 36 stores in New Territories.

== Endorsements ==
Andy Lau has been a model for the Baleno label since at least 2003, and was featured in the Voice of Baleno 10th Anniversary concert at the Hong Kong Convention and Exhibition Centre on November 5, 2006. Faye Wong has also been a model for the brand; Baleno was Title Sponsor for her December 2003 concert series at the Hong Kong Coliseum, and she modelled their collection for a 2005 calendar.
