= La Salle College =

Secondary school in Kowloon, Hong Kong

- 喇沙書院
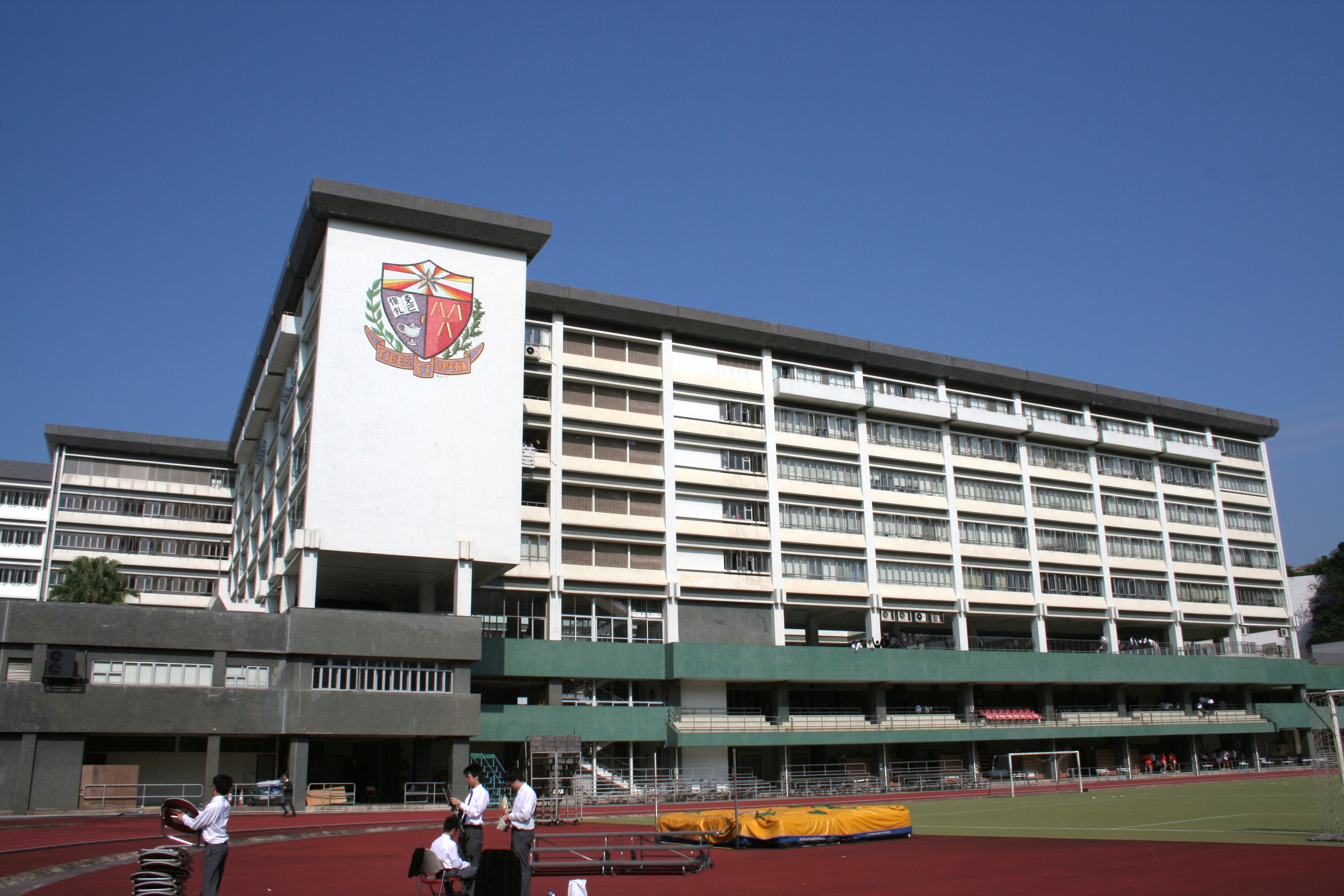

Location
- 18 La Salle Road; Hong Kong; 22°19′45.11″N 114°10′56.93″E

Information
- Type: Grant School
- Motto: Latin: Fides et Opera (Faith and Works)
- Religious affiliation: Catholic
- Established: 6 January 1932; 94 years ago
- Founder: Institute of the Brothers of the Christian Schools
- School district: Kowloon City
- Principal: Leung Ho-yin
- Faculty: 95 teachers
- Grades: Form 1 – Form 6
- Gender: Boys
- Enrollment: 1297 (2018–19)
- Campus: 29,000 square metres (310,000 sq ft)
- Color: Purple - White - Red
- Newspaper: The Lasallian
- Yearbook: The Lasallite
- Affiliations: Lasallian educational institutions
- Website: lasalle.edu.hk

La Salle College (LSC; Chinese: 喇沙書院; Jyutping: laa3 saa1 syu1 jyun2) is a boys' secondary school located in Kowloon City District, Hong Kong. It was established in 1932 by the Institute of the Brothers of the Christian Schools, a Catholic religious teaching order founded by St John Baptist de La Salle. Regarded as one of Hong Kong's more prestigious institutions, the school often produces top-scorers in public examinations. The school uses English as the medium of instruction.

== History ==
=== Foundation ===
In the 1910s, Kowloon was expanding rapidly; the Second Convention of Peking had caused New Kowloon to be leased to Britain along with the New Territories. The escalating cost of real estate and increasing population density in Hong Kong Island prompted Portuguese residents to migrate en masse to Kowloon. Subsequently, the Brothers of the Christian Schools, who had founded St Joseph's College in 1875, opened a junior school on Chatham Road near Rosary Church; St Joseph's had catered to many Portuguese students, whose parents wanted their son to receive a Catholic and English education. The junior school was officially opened on 5 September 1917.

Noting the surge in demand for school places, Brother Aimar Sauron (1873–1945), the director of St Joseph's, realised that a new school building was necessary. He acquired a 10-acre (4.0-hectare) hilly plot near Prince Edward Road as a site for the new La Salle College on 23 April 1928, for a sum of HK$120,000. The site was immediately north of the city boundary (i.e., in New Kowloon); that section of Boundary Street was not yet a formal road when the school site was bought, which was only gazetted in 1929. An annex was also built in January 1938, which later became the first La Salle Primary School building.

On 5 November 1930, Sir William Peel, then Governor of Hong Kong, laid the foundation stone of the new building. By 3 December 1931, the work on the building and the playgrounds was sufficiently advanced to allow the opening of eight classes for 303 pupils, under the management of five Brothers from St Joseph's and four assistant masters from the Chatham Road Branch School.

Replacing the junior school, La Salle College was formally inaugurated on 6 January 1932. Seven Brothers, headed by Brother Aimar as director, took over. A few days later 40 boarders occupied the quarters to the west of the building. There were then 540 students in 14 classes. About one-third of the students had European (mostly Portuguese) connection.

=== World War II ===
Brother Aimar was the principal of the school for its first seven years. The students were offered matriculation examinations, the laboratories were constructed, four tennis courts and a full-sized football pitch were built, and the statue of Jean-Baptiste de La Salle that now stands in front of the college was erected. The number of students increased to 805 in 1935 and 1,060 in 1939.

In 1939, La Salle College was affected when World War II commenced in Europe. On 3 September 1939, Britain declared war on Germany, and the British War Department in Hong Kong designated the La Salle College campus as an internment camp for German nationals arrested in Hong Kong that same day. Those interned included the German engineer Gerhard Neumann. The internment camp was run for approximately eight months, during which time the Brothers organised classes in morning and afternoon sessions in the College Annex across the road (the building which was to become La Salle Primary School in 1957).

On 8 December 1941, the Japanese attacked Hong Kong, and the school building was again taken over by the British Military, this time as a relief hospital. After the surrender of Hong Kong on Christmas Day 1941, the Japanese took over the school building. In December 1941 the school's operations was suspended until September 1946, and In February 1942, the Brothers were expelled from the college. During the Japanese occupation, the college was believed to have been used as a Number One Japanese military hospital (out of four in Kowloon) until August 1945.

=== Post-war development ===
School recommenced in September 1946. By the end of 1949, the Chinese Civil War was coming to an end. Most of China was controlled by the Communist government of Mao Zedong and the People's Liberation Army was rapidly advancing southwards towards the Hong Kong border. Owing to that threat, the British Army reinforced their garrisons in Hong Kong. In need of a hospital, the British Army expropriated the use of the college grounds, originally agreed to be only for 12 to 18 months. Meanwhile, the Hong Kong government erected wood hutments on a plot at Perth Street, Ho Man Tin. The temporary occupation dragged on for ten years, taking the concerted efforts of the local government, some members of the British Parliament, and the Vatican to finally dislodge the Army in August 1959.

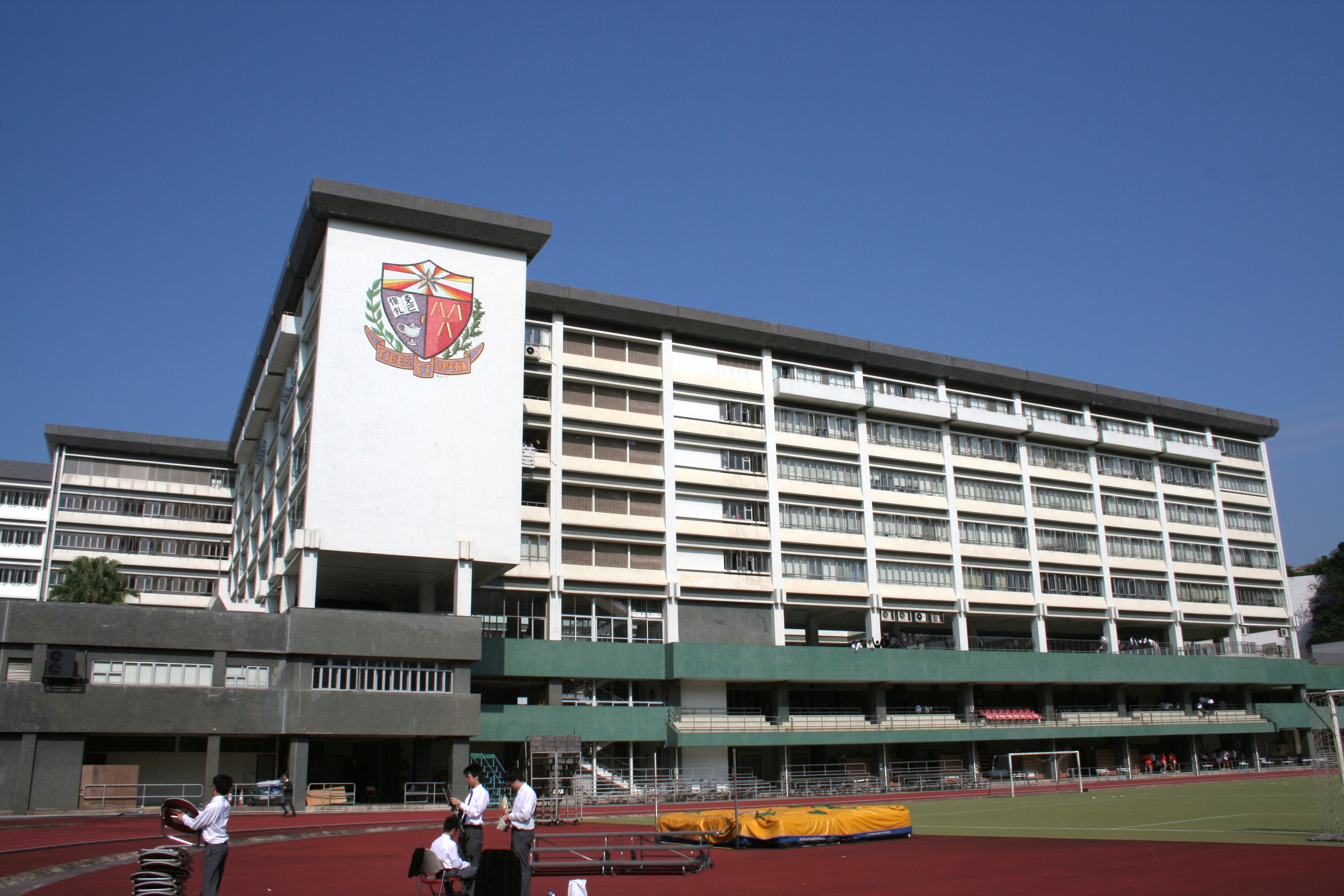
Main college campus

Brother Felix was appointed director of the school in 1956 and re-acquired the college buildings from the military authorities on 1 August 1959. Student numbers grew steadily, and this led to a separation of primary and secondary divisions. La Salle Primary School was founded in 1957 and Brother Henry Pang was appointed its founder and first headmaster.

In 1964 the La Salle College Evening School was commenced within the main campus building; in 1969 the Evening School was separated and became Chan Sui Ki (La Salle) College in Ho Man Tin. The decision was taken by the Brothers, headed by the then Brother Director, Brother Raphael Egan, in 1977 to undertake the replacement of the ageing building. While classes were continuing, a portion of the school grounds were used to erect a new building. The project was funded via the sale of approximately one-third of the school grounds to Cheung Kong Holdings, owned by Li Ka-shing. The governor of Hong Kong, Sir Murray MacLehose, officially opened the new school building on 19 February 1982, in its Golden Jubilee year.

== Admission ==
A decent amount of La Salle College's total Form 1 intake is from its associated La Salle Primary School, with some from other primary schools. Applicants attend interviews in Chinese and English, which are conducted by the supervisor and the principal. La Salle College aims to enrol students who demonstrate not only proficient academic performances, but also accomplishments in extracurricular activities and dedication to strong moral conduct.

La Salle College applicants may also apply to study French as an alternative to Chinese for non-mandarin or cantonese speakers.

== School associations ==
=== The Old Boys' Association ===
The La Salle College Old Boys' Association (LSCOBA) is the alumni organisation. It was founded in 1939 and its membership, as of 31 March 2017, was 7,453. By tradition, alumni of La Salle College are called La Salle Old Boys. The Association organizes social events for old boys, learning opportunities for current students and sponsors various student activities.

== Curriculum ==
The school follows the local HKDSE curriculum.

As required by Hong Kong law, schools must have two examinations every year: mid-year and final examination. In between the two examinations, students are provided feedback on their performance through continuous assessments, which accounts for 20% of the total subject mark.

== Extracurricular activities ==
=== Interest clubs and societies ===
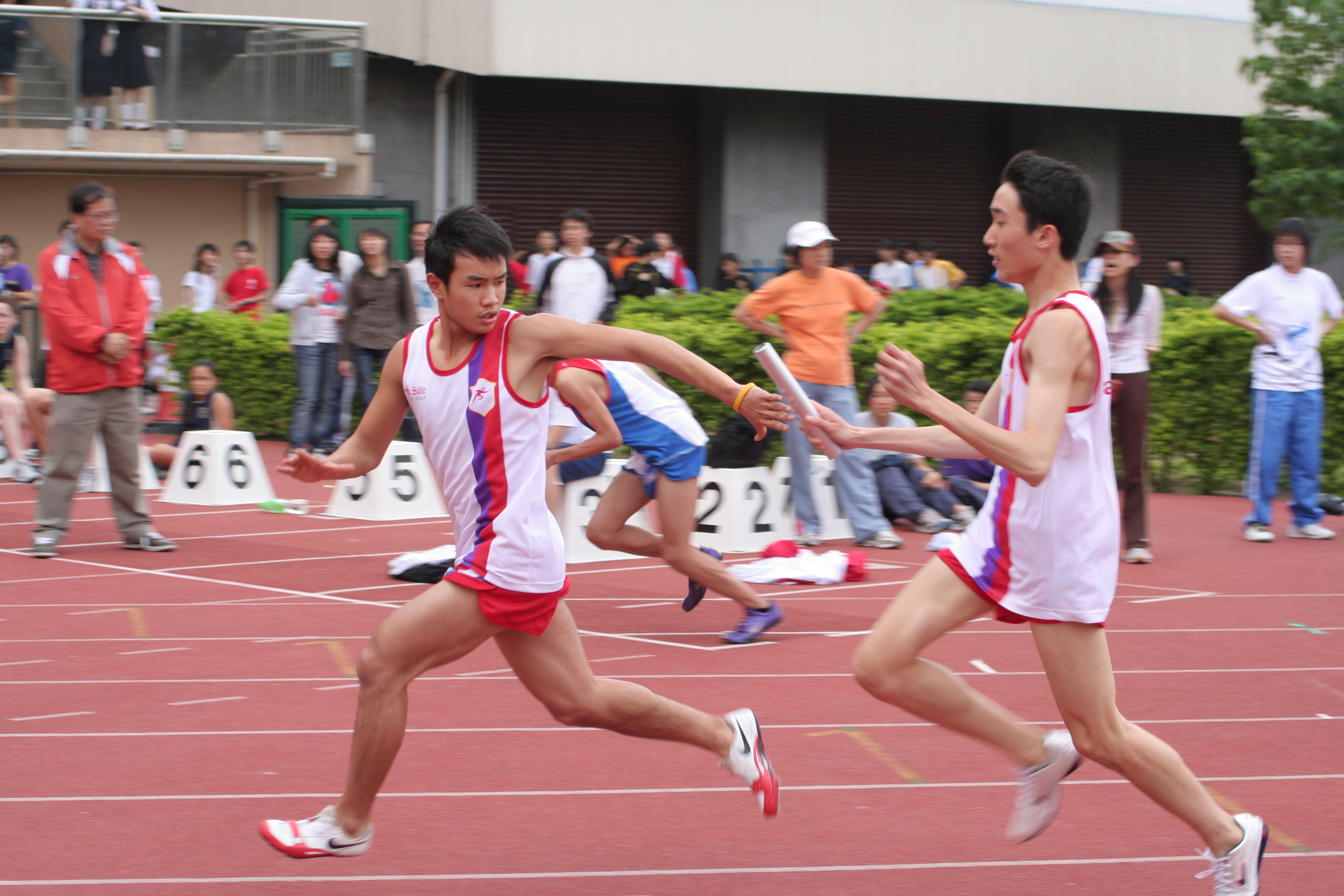
La Salle athletes

La Salle College has over 50 clubs and societies. Clubs are divided into academic, cultural, sports, interest and service. Joining clubs is mandatory.

=== Academic achievements ===
In 1993, the school produced the first student achieving ten distinctions in Arts subjects in the Hong Kong Certificate of Education Examination (HKCEE).

La Salle College has produced 25 perfect scorers "10As" in the history of Hong Kong Certificate of Education Examination (HKCEE) and 6 "Top Scorers" and "Super Top Scorers" in the history of Hong Kong Diploma of Secondary Education Examination (HKDSE).

LSC counts five winners of the Hong Kong Outstanding Students Awards, ranking tied 16th among all secondary schools in Hong Kong.

=== Music ===
2025 77th Hong Kong Schools Music Festival

- Disqualified from String Orchestra (Senior) and String Quartet (Senior) categories due to violation of regulations
- Symphony Orchestra (1st), but the class only has one team.
- String Orchestra, failed to achieve top three in all categories. (Senior and Intermediate)

2024 76th Hong Kong Schools Music Festival

- Forgot to enroll in the festival

2023 Hong Kong Youth Music Interflow

- Symphony Orchestra (Gold award). It is worth noting that multiple "Gold awards" can be given out to multiple participants.

=== Sports ===
In sports, La Salle College has won badminton championships in all grades in 1993–1994, 2003–2004, and 2004–2005 in the Kowloon area. La Salle has won championships in archery, athletics, badminton, basketball, cross country, fencing (Grand slam in 2010–2011), football, hockey, softball, squash (18 consecutive years, 1994–2012), swimming, table tennis, tennis, tenpin bowling, and volleyball. The table tennis team was named the overall champions seven years in a row, from 2000 to 2007.

The Omega Rose Bowl, and its successor the Bauhinia Bowl, is awarded to the secondary school with the best all-round sporting performance in the Hong Kong Island and Kowloon region. La Salle College has been the Boys School Champions 26 times, ranking 2nd in the Boys' Schools section. La Salle College holds the record of receiving the Rose Bowl, predecessor of the Bauhinia Bowl, for the longest period—17 years—between 1974 and 1991. The most recent Athletics prize was their championship in the Inter-school Athletics Meet 2019.

== Notable alumni ==
=== Government ===
- John Tsang, 曾俊華, GBM, JP, former financial secretary, HKSAR Government, 2017 Chief Executive Election Canadiate.
- Dr. Chan Cho Chak, John, 陳祖澤, former deputy chief secretary, former secretary for trade and industry and former secretary for education and manpower, HK Government
- Sir Roger Lobo, 羅保爵士, CBE, LLD, JP, former member of Executive Council (ExCo), Legislative Council (LegCo), and Urban Council
- Hilton Cheong-Leen, 張有興, CBE, JP, former chairman of the Urban Council, former member of Legislative Council (LegCo)
- Arnaldo de Oliveira Sales, GBM, JP, former chairman of the Urban Council
- Ching Cheung-ying, 程張迎, MH, Sha Tin District Council Representative for San Tin Wai Estate, Chinese language teacher in Diocesan Boys' School, former Urban Council representative
- Pau Shiu-hung, 鮑紹雄, SBS, JP, former director of architectural services, current vice president of the Hong Kong Science and Technology Parks Corporation, former chief commissioner and current honorary commissioner of the Scout Association of Hong Kong
- Bernard Chan Pak-li, 陳百里 (1993), former district councillor, current political assistant, Commerce and Economic Development Bureau

=== Arts and culture ===
- Bruce Lee, 李小龍, actor in martial arts films and founder of Jeet Kune Do Started at the school in 1952.
- Dr. James Wong, aka Wong Jim, 黃霑, renowned composer, and lyricist of the La Salle College School Song (Chinese Version)
- Albert Leung, 林夕, Chinese lyricist and writer (studied F.6–7)
- Michael Hui, 許冠文, Hong Kong film comedian, scriptwriter and director
- Philip Chan, zh:陳欣健, media management, film director, producer, script-writer, emcee, radio show host, talk show host and singer
- Sammy Leung, 森美, DJ, singer and actor
- Anthony Lun, 倫永亮, Cantopop singer, composer and producer
- Hsien-yung Pai, 白先勇, Chinese author
- Oscar Tao, 涂毓麟, Cantopop singer, music show host, Good Night Show - King Maker contestant,
- Pong Nan, 藍奕邦, Cantopop musician, singer-songwriter and actor in Hong Kong of Hakka ancestry.

=== Business ===
- Jack Chak-kwong So, 蘇澤光, chairman of the Hong Kong Film Development Council
- John Chen, 程守忠, 程守宗, former CEO of Sybase and interim CEO of Blackberry Ltd, CEO, Siemens Nixdorf Information System, chairman of the US Committee of 100
- Billy Kan, billionaire businessman
- Dr. William Man-wai Mong, 蒙民偉, founder of Shun Hing Group
- Peter Wong, 王冬勝, executive director of HSBC
- Arnold Chow, 周國昌, general manager of BOCHK
- John Shek-yau Lau, executive chairman, Ecargo Holdings Limited; group managing director and founder, CS Holdings Limited and Cargo Services Group

=== Science and engineering ===
- Henry Tye, 戴自海, Horace White Professor of Physics at Cornell University
- Simon S. Lam, 林善成, Regents Chair Emeritus in Computer Science at University of Texas-Austin, created in 1993 the first secure sockets layer for making Internet applications secure, e.g., banking and shopping on web, email. He was inducted into the Internet Hall of Fame.
- Peter Lee, 李忠琛, brother of Bruce Lee, assistant director of Hong Kong Observatory.

=== Legal ===
- Sir Po-shing Woo, 胡寶星爵士, Non-Executive Director of Sun Hung Kai Properties and Henderson Land
- The Honorable Mr Justice Roberto Alexandre Vieira Ribeiro (Class of 1965)

=== Medicine ===
- Dr. Shih Tai Cho Louis, 史泰祖, 2014-2016 President of The Hong Kong Medical Association

=== Sports ===
- Vincent Wong Wing Ki, 黃永棋, badminton player who defeated four-time world champion Lin Dan in the 2011 Denmark Open
- Leung Nok Hang, 梁諾恆, footballer who currently plays for Chinese Super League club Zhejiang Greentown

== See also ==
- Lasallian educational institutions
- Education in Hong Kong
- List of schools in Hong Kong
- La Salle College Middle Swan
