= Christopher Lau Kwan =

Hong Kong businessman

LAU, Kwan Christopher 劉堃
- Born: Hong Kong
- Occupations: Managing Director, XK Capital; Executive Director, Gold Peak Technology Group; Director, HKCIEA
- Board member of: Gold Peak Technology Group (SEHK: 40) (2024–); GP Industries (SGX: G20 ) (2020–2024); Ecargo (ASX: ECG) (2014–2021); CS Logistics Holdings Ltd (2010–2012)

Christopher Lau (Chinese: 劉堃) is Managing Director, XK Capital, Executive Director, Gold Peak Technology Group and Director, The Hong Kong Chinese Importers' and Exporters' Association. Lau was previously the chief executive officer and founder of Ecargo, an ASX listed e-commerce company and co-chief executive officer and co-founder of WWE & Company, a China social shopping mobile platform company.

== Education ==
Lau holds a bachelor's degree in accounting and finance from the Stern School of Business, New York University, where he graduated in 2001.

== Business ==
Lau began his career with Ernst & Young in New York City and subsequently spent two years in Deutsche Bank’s fixed income business in New York. Christopher Lau was the group assistant managing director and an executive director at Cargo Services Far East Limited from 2006 to 2012. He was an executive director of CS Logistics Holdings Limited from 2010 to 2012. At Cargo Services Far East Limited, Lau founded the GAM division in 2007. He was instrumental in the transformation of Cargo Services Far East Limited to become the leading integrated retail supply chain solutions service provider based in Hong Kong, contributed significantly in the development and implementation of the LIMA platforms for many retail brands and was involved in the acquisition of Allport Limited together with HSBC’s strategic investment in CS Logistics in 2010.

== Community and charity work ==
In 2012, Lau was made Honorary Member of the Court at the Hong Kong Baptist University. He is also a member of the programme and fund raising committee at The Dragon Foundation, a non-profit organisation in Hong Kong.

== Family ==
Lau's father is John Lau Shek Yau, a Hong Kong entrepreneur and logistics tycoon.
