= Cotton Dell =

Nature reserve in Staffordshire, England

- Location within Staffordshire
- Interactive map of Cotton Dell
- Location: near Cotton, Staffordshire
- OS grid: SK 062 462
- Coordinates: 53°0′47″N 1°54′33″W
- Area: 86 hectares (210 acres)
- Operator: Staffordshire Wildlife Trust
- Website: www.staffs-wildlife.org.uk/nature-reserves/cotton-dell

Cotton Dell is a nature reserve of the Staffordshire Wildlife Trust. It is a wooded valley area near the village of Cotton and about 0.5 miles (0.8 km) north of the village of Oakamoor, in Staffordshire, England.

== History ==
The Cotton estate was owned in the 1700s by the politician Thomas Gilbert; he lived here from 1795, and tended the woodlands. In 1868 the woodlands became the property of Cotton College. The college closed in 1987, and the estate was sold by 1999, Cotton Dell then becoming a nature reserve.

== Description ==
Car parking is at the Staffordshire County Council picnic area at Oakamoor, half a mile from the reserve.

The area of the reserve is 86 hectares (210 acres). There are paths through the site, which, in the valley terrain, are steep in places. Cotton Brook flows through the valley, and there is a path following the course of the brook.

There is a range of features: the brook, grasslands, ponds, boggy areas and the steep sides of the valley. Particular species of plants can be found in each habitat.

It is an ancient woodland, the area being continuously wooded for over 400 years. The wood has been managed in the past: there are few very old trees, and there are areas of conifers in places, which support less wildlife than broadleaf woodland.

The Trust plans to ensure that the reserve is beneficial for wildlife: managing it so that there is a range of broadleaf trees in the reserve, such as oak, alder and birch, and shrubs such as holly and field maple, and gaps in the wood so that new trees can germinate. Dead wood is also important, providing a habitat for fungi, woodpeckers and other wildlife.

== Restoration of 18th-century bridge ==
A dry stone bridge in the reserve, constructed in the late 18th century for the industrial activity in this part of the Churnet Valley, was in danger of collapsing because of landslip and movement of some of the stones. Restoration, funded by the Derbyshire Environmental Trust, supporters of Leek Local Group for the Staffordshire Wildlife Trust, and a donation from a local resident, was completed in November 2025.
