= Billy Kan =

- Born: Che Kin Kan; 1951 or 1952 (age 73–74); British Hong Kong
- Education: La Salle College; Cotton College
- Alma mater: University of East Anglia
- Occupation: Businessman
- Children: 2

Chinese name
- Traditional Chinese: 簡志堅
- Simplified Chinese: 简志坚
- Hanyu Pinyin: Jiǎn Zhìjiān
- Yale Romanization: Gaán Jigīn

Billy Albert Kan Che-kin (born 1951/52) is a Hong Kong billionaire who is the chairman and chief executive officer of China LNG Group Limited (formerly Artel Solutions).

He was educated at La Salle College in Hong Kong and Cotton College in England, followed by the University of East Anglia where he graduated with a BSc in mathematics. A former executive at Deloitte and KPMG, he was awarded an honorary doctorate from the University of East Anglia in 2016.

Kan is married with two children and lives in Hong Kong.
