= Listed buildings in Cotton, Staffordshire =

Cotton is a civil parish in the district of Staffordshire Moorlands, Staffordshire, England. It contains twelve listed buildings that are recorded in the National Heritage List for England. All the listed buildings are designated at Grade II, the lowest of the three grades, which is applied to "buildings of national importance and special interest". The parish contains the village of Cotton, and is otherwise mainly rural. The listed buildings consist of a college, two churches, farmhouses, a cottage and associated farm buildings, four mileposts, and a war memorial.

== Buildings ==
Name and location	Photograph	Date	Notes
Hall Farmhouse and former cottages 53.01679°N 1.90514°W	—	18th century	The farmhouse and attached former workers' cottages, later incorporated into the house, are in stone and have tile roofs with coped verges on kneelers. The farmhouse has two storeys and an attic, a floor band, and a T-shaped plan with a main range of three bays and a rear wing. In the centre is a gabled porch, and the windows are three-light top-hung casements with chamfered mullions, and there are three gabled dormers. The two former cottages are at right angles to the house, and have dentilled eaves, one bay each, and windows similar to the house.
Elm Farmhouse; 53.01709°N 1.90536°W	—	18th century	The farmhouse is in stone and red brick with a dentilled eaves band, and has a tile roof. There are two storeys and an attic, a main range of three bays, and a gabled wing. Some windows are casements, some are mullioned, and in the wing are sash windows.
Lanehead Farmhouse, stable, gate and railings 53.03354°N 1.92225°W	—	18th century	The farmhouse is in stone with quoins, a moulded eaves band, and a tile roof. There are two storeys and an attic, two bays, and a later recessed extension to the right. The central doorway has a chamfered surround, and the windows have chamfered mullions. The stable to the left has two storeys and three bays, the lower storey in stone and the upper storey in brick. It contains a stable door, a casement window, and a loft opening. The garden in front of the house is enclosed by wrought iron railings and a gate.
Spring Cottage and cowhouse 53.02538°N 1.91530°W	—	18th century	The cottage and cowhouse are in stone with quoins, and a tile roof with coped verges. The cottage has two storeys and two bays, and the cowhouse is to he left. The windows in the cottage are mullioned.
Cotton College; 53.01520°N 1.90375°W		Late 18th century	Originally a Georgian house, it was extended in 1846–48 by A. W. N. Pugin in Gothic style, and there have been later extensions. The original house is in red brick with stone dressings and a slate Mansard roof. Pugin's additions are in stone, red and brown brick, and have tile roofs with three gables, and the later extensions are in stone.
St John's Church; 53.01503°N 1.90261°W		1795	The church is in red brick on a stone plinth, and has a slate roof. It has a cruciform plan, consisting of a nave, a west porch, north and south transeptal chapels, and a chancel. Above the porch is an embattled parapet, an oculus, an inscribed stone, and a small bellcote. The gables also have embattled parapets and apex finials, and the windows have pointed heads. Inside the church is a west gallery.
St Wilfrid's Church; 53.01470°N 1.90302°W	—	1846–48	The Roman Catholic church, which became the chapel of Cotton College, was designed by A. W. N. Pugin in Gothic style, and was extended in 1936–37. It is in stone with a tile roof, and consists of a nave, a south aisle, a chancel, a northeast vestry, and a southwest steeple. The steeple has a tower with three stages, angle buttresses, a northwest stair turret, and a broach spire.
Milepost at N.G.R. SK 05514819; 53.03103°N 1.91923°W		Mid to late 19th century	The milepost is on the south side of the A52 road. It is in cast iron, and has a triangular plan and a sloping top. On the top is "COTTON", and on the sides are the distances to Froghall, Cheadle, Hanley, Stoke-on-Trent, Newcastle-under-Lyme, and Ashbourne.
Milepost at N.G.R. SK 07054809; 53.03007°N 1.89633°W	—	Mid to late 19th century	The milepost is on the south side of the A52 road. It is in cast iron, and has a triangular plan and a sloping top. On the top is "COTTON", and on the sides are the distances to Froghall, Cheadle, Hanley, Stoke-on-Trent, Newcastle-under-Lyme, and Ashbourne.
Milepost at N.G.R. SK 05894983; 53.04582°N 1.91345°W		Mid to late 19th century	The milepost is in cast iron, and has a triangular plan and a sloping top. On the top is "COTTON", and on the sides are the distances to Leek, Ellastone, Rocester, and Uttoxeter.
Milepost at N.G.R. SK 06414836; 53.03257°N 1.90581°W		Mid to late 19th century	The milepost is in cast iron, and has a triangular plan and a sloping top. On the top is "COTTON", and on the sides are the distances to Leek, Ellastone, Rocester, and Uttoxeter.
Cotton College War Memorial; 53.01011°N 1.90456°W	—	1920	The war memorial was moved to its present site in 2016. It consists of a calvary with a pitched roof in oak, on an octagonal shaft carved with roses. The shaft stands on an octagonal two-stepped plinth in Portland stone, on two octagonal steps in York stone on a cross-shaped base. On the plinth are faces with blind niches alternating with faces carved with the names of the former pupils of Cotton College who were lost in the two World Wars. Below, on the top step is a stone plaque with an inscription in Latin.
