= KEF =

British audio equipment manufacturer

- Industry: Consumer Electronics
- Founded: 1961
- Founder: Raymond Cooke
- Headquarters: Maidstone, England
- Products: Hi-Fi speakers, wireless Hi-Fi speakers, loudspeakers, subwoofers, headphones, Bluetooth speakers, portable speakers
- Owner: GP Acoustics International Ltd., a subsidiary of Gold Peak Technology Group Limited
- Website: kef.com

KEF is a British company that produces high-end audio products, including HiFi speakers, subwoofers, architecture speakers, wireless speakers and headphones. It was founded in Maidstone, Kent in 1961 by BBC engineer Raymond Cooke (1925–1995). In 1992, the Hong Kong–based Gold Peak Group acquired KEF. GP Acoustics, a member of Gold Peak, became the owner of the company. KEF continues to develop and manufacture its products in Maidstone.

KEF is named after its original site, Kent Engineering and Foundry. Product development, acoustical technology research and the manufacture of signature products still occurs at the original Maidstone site in England. KEF was the first loudspeaker manufacturer in the world to employ computers in loudspeaker design and measurement. KEF introduced the world's first coincident-source speaker driver, called Uni-Q, in 1988, which is now in its 12th generation; And it is still featured in almost all its speakers today. KEF is the first company in the HiFi industry to use metamaterial to absorb the unwanted sound from the rear of a speaker driver; the technology is called Metamaterial Absorption Technology (MAT).

KEF has received over 300 awards and holds more than 150 patents. KEF also has published more than 50 academic papers and has received two Queen's Awards for Export Achievement.

== History ==
=== 1960s ===
In 1961, Raymond Cooke and Robert Pearch founded KEF Electronics Ltd. in Kent with a view to creating innovative loudspeakers using the latest in materials technology. KEF was situated on land adjacent to the River Medway in Tovil which at the time was owned by Kent Engineering & Foundry (a company owned by Robert Pearch and founded by his father Leonard) which at the time manufactured agricultural equipment and industrial sweeping machines. KEF derived its name from that firm.

Cooke was a Royal Navy WWII veteran and was a design engineer at the British Broadcasting Corporation (BBC) for a year. He was later Technical Director at Wharfedale, then a leading British loudspeaker manufacturer. Following corporate change at Wharfedale, Cooke left to see his own ideas realised. Cooke acquired the site of a foundry in Tovil, Maidstone, owned by makers of agricultural machines, and initially worked in Nissen huts erected on the site. In KEF: 50 Years of Innovation in Sound, the authors assert that KEF reduced the average size of bass-rich home loudspeakers from 9–10 cubic feet (250–280 L) to about 2 cubic feet (57 L), based on the work on the "acoustic-suspension woofer" at Acoustic Research. The company pioneered large-scale production of drivers with cones made of materials other than paper, and the application of fast Fourier transform analysis to the acoustics of loudspeakers. KEF was also an early-adopter of modern quality-control principles to driver manufacture.

The first loudspeaker manufactured was the K1 Slimline in which the driver units used diaphragms made of polystyrene and melinex. Soon after, in 1962, came the famous B139 'racetrack'-shaped woofer, which allowed for the design of the Celeste—one of the first truly high-performance bookshelf loudspeakers. As Laurie Fincham, Cooke's successor as chief engineer, later revealed, the only reason the B139 had vertically mounted ovoid-shaped was that the British tax code at the time penalised two-way speakers below a certain arbitrary width. Professional products were not taxed and professional was defined as above 8 inches for a woofer or as a 3-way speaker.

From the mid-1960s, KEF manufactured BBC-designed monitor loudspeakers, such as the LS5/1A, for the Corporation and for wider distribution. Cooke's previous relationship with the BBC in the 1950s continued as KEF developed through the 1960s and '70s. In the mid-1960s KEF introduced the bextrene-coned B110 bass/midrange unit and the melinex-domed T27 tweeter which were later used in the diminutive, BBC-designed LS3/5A broadcast monitor, which was initially meant for use in cramped broadcast vans; over 50,000 pairs of the speakers were later sold worldwide. The close co-operation between KEF and the BBC Research department was fruitful for both, as BBC provided stringent performance and production standards, with ample capacity for field testing, and with KEF being a pioneer in the use of polymers and computerised quality control.

=== 1970s ===
In the 1970s, as "KEF Electronics Limited", the company was awarded two Queens Awards for Export Achievement (in 1970 and 1975) as the company became known beyond the UK. This further substantiated Raymond Cooke's choice of location for his factory as it "was closer to Europe" and hence transportation costs for its goods would be cheaper.

In 1973, KEF became the first loudspeaker manufacturer in the world to implement the use of computers in loudspeaker design and measurement. KEF used digital technologies to achieve the highest audio accuracy, every pair of Reference Model 104s can be matched to within 0.5 dB of the laboratory-maintained reference standard.

The LS3/5a was the original mini monitor, inspired by KEF drivers and designed at the BBC, that transformed the audio experience in 1975. It was renowned for delivering accurate, precise sound for the recording and broadcast industry.

In 1976, KEF's design methodology was refined to create a new approach to loudspeaker development—computer assisted 'Total System Design'—with the release of the Corelli, Calinda and Cantata. A year later, in 1977, Reference Model 105, a radical and sophisticated loudspeaker, was launched.

In addition to making speakers, a substantial part of KEF's activity was as an OEM supplier of loudspeaker systems, baffles and drivers. Cooke decided early on that huge potential benefits could be reaped from selling raw drivers to competitors, benefits that more than outweighed the potential cannibalisation of their own market position. In a relatively short time, many major and renowned loudspeaker manufacturers came to source their drive units from KEF. Users included illustrious British brands such as IMF, Rogers, Celef and Monitor Audio, as well as manufacturers outside UK, including Sonus Faber and Wilson Audio. Linn Products of Scotland also elected to use KEF drive units in its Linn Isobarik, Linn Sara and Linn Kan speakers. KEF's KEFKITs also provided many hi-fi hobbyists with the means to apply their woodworking skills to making their own speakers. At its peak, production of drive units reached 10,000 units per week. In 1979, Queen Elizabeth II awarded Cooke an OBE.

=== 1980s ===
The 1980s saw a series of technological enhancements, including coupled-cavity bass loading that considerably boosted bass performance, force-cancelling and driver decoupling to eliminate cabinet coloration, and the KEF Universal Bass Equaliser (KUBE) which allowed for extended bass response from compact enclosures.

In 1988, KEF designed and patented the world's first truly coincident-source speaker driver Uni-Q, which enlarged the optimum listening area, allowing people sitting at different spots in the room to experience the same quality of sound.

=== 1990s ===
Throughout the 1990s KEF continued to design products, including Coda 7, Q Series, Reference Series Model 109 and Monitor Series. The Reference Series Model 105/3, featuring the second generation of Uni-Q technology, was voted "Best imported Speaker" by the Japanese press in 1992.

The New York Times has recognised KEF as "a leading audio company in Europe", and also "well known to American High-End audiophiles".

In 1992, KEF was acquired by Gold Peak Group.

In 1993, KEF introduced the Model 100 centre speaker. In the following year, KEF released a THX-approved home theatre system—a subwoofer/satellite concept with vertically directional front speakers and dipole surrounds.

Founder Raymond Cooke OBE died in 1995. He left KEF with firm guiding principles encapsulated in his core values of "Quality, Honesty, Dedication and Innovation".

=== 2000s ===
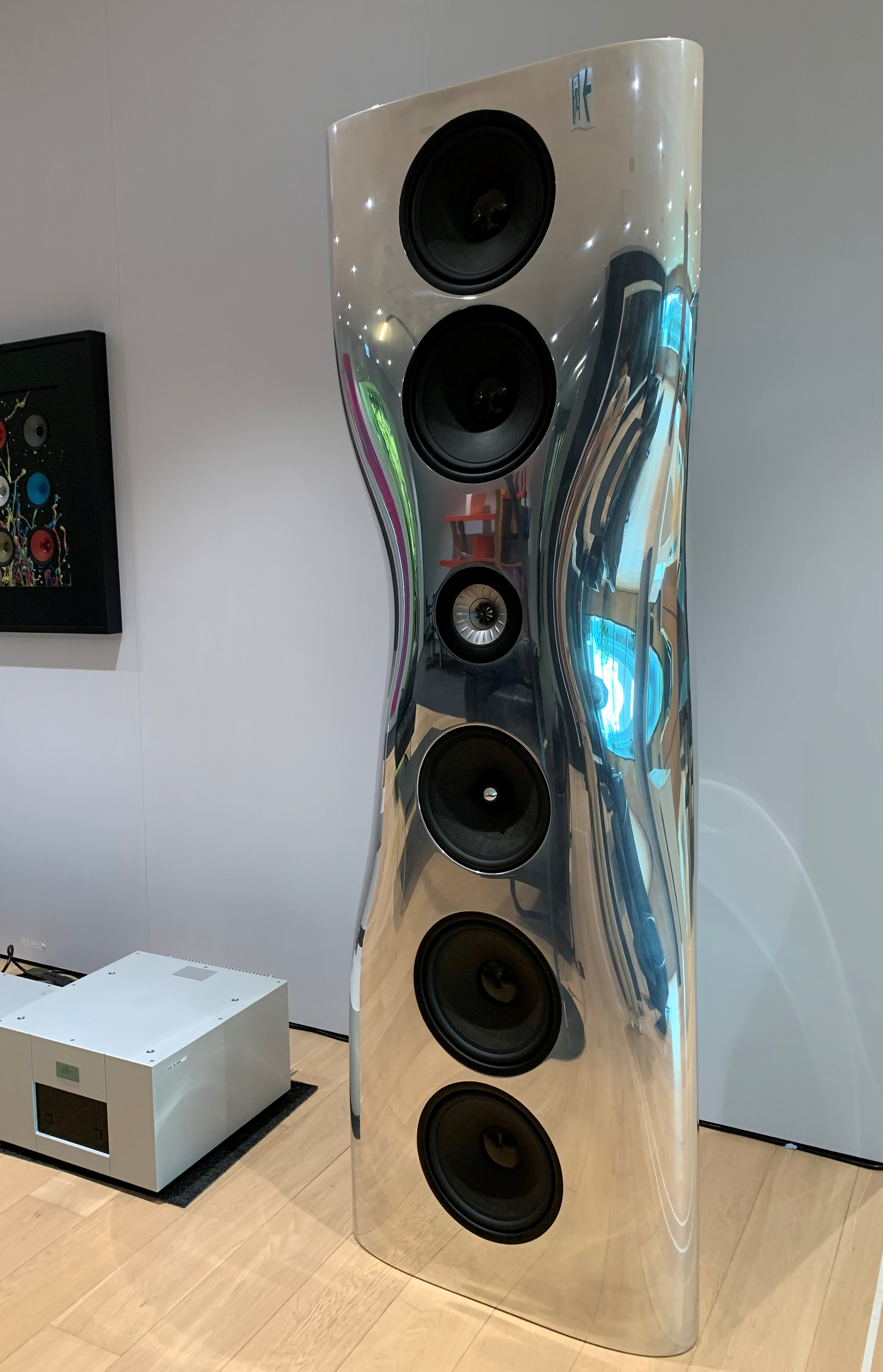
KEF Muon designed by Ross Lovegrove (2007)

In the early 2000s, KEF was developing the use of magnetic and mechanical modelling techniques in speaker designs, including Finite Element Analysis, which allows acoustic systems to be modelled with an accuracy not previously achievable using other methods. The Reference Series Model 207/2 was launched with major upgrades from the previous Reference Series. After a comprehensive research and development program since the late 1980s, in 2005 KEF introduced the ACE (Acoustic Compliance Enhancement) technology, which enables the same bass performance as a conventional speaker of twice the size.

In 2007, the Muon speaker was launched at the Milan Furniture Fair. It was the first collaboration of KEF with leading Industrial designer Ross Lovegrove. The Muon is limited to an edition of 100 pairs worldwide. Also in 2007, The patented Tangerine Waveguide was introduced to the 8th generation of Uni-Q driver array, which gave an improvement in sensitivity and sound dispersion. This innovation was applied with the launch of KHT3005—the "EGG" home theatre system.

=== 2010s ===
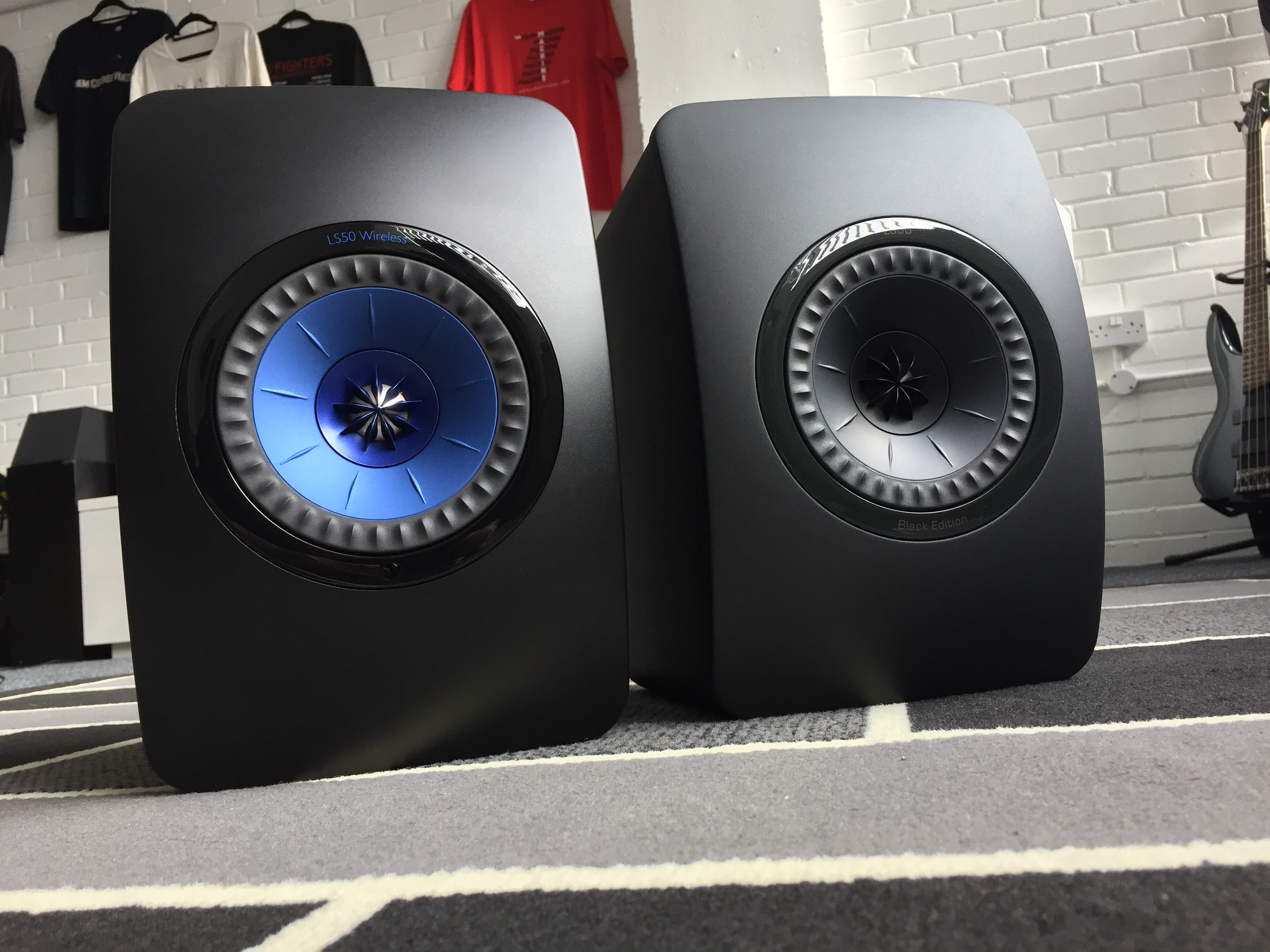
KEF LS50, wireless and Black Edition (2018)

In 2011, KEF launched The BLADE. KEF engineers were briefed to design an ultimate loudspeaker without design or cost limitations. Single Apparent Source configuration technology was released and featured in The BLADE. In 2012, KEF launched a new classic LS50 as a 50th-anniversary product. LS50 took the original LS3/5a studio monitor concept and brought it to the living room. In 2017, KEF introduced the first wireless HiFi speakers, the LS50 Wireless. In the following years, KEF introduced a number of wireless products, including the EGG wireless speakers, MUO portable speakers, M Series headphones; and the collaboration with Porsche Design produced the Gravity One portable speakers, Motion One earphones and Space One wireless headphones.

=== 2020s and beyond ===
In 2020, KEF introduced the use of Metamaterial Absorption Technology (aka MAT) in speaker design. The technology has been awarded the "Innovation of the Year" by What Hi-Fi? Awards 2020. The new technology has been implemented in the new LS50 collection, which consists of the LS50 Meta and LS50 Wireless II. In 2021, the Michael Young–designed KC62 subwoofer was launched with a new technology called "Uni-Core", which combines both drivers into a single motor system, allowing cabinet size to be reduced by over a third, while also increasing excursion to generate greater output and depth. In the same year, KEF announced its first automotive partnership with Lotus, bringing its Uni-Q technology, in a 10-channel sound system, to the Lotus Emira premium sport car. In 2022, the release of new LSX II and LS60 wireless speakers, also designed by Michael Young, received favourable reviews in the specialist and general press, with Wired magazine calling the LS60 an "Absolute Triumph". The LS60 Wireless received the EISA Best Product 2022–2023 award in the Wireless Floorstanding Loudspeakers category.

== Technology ==
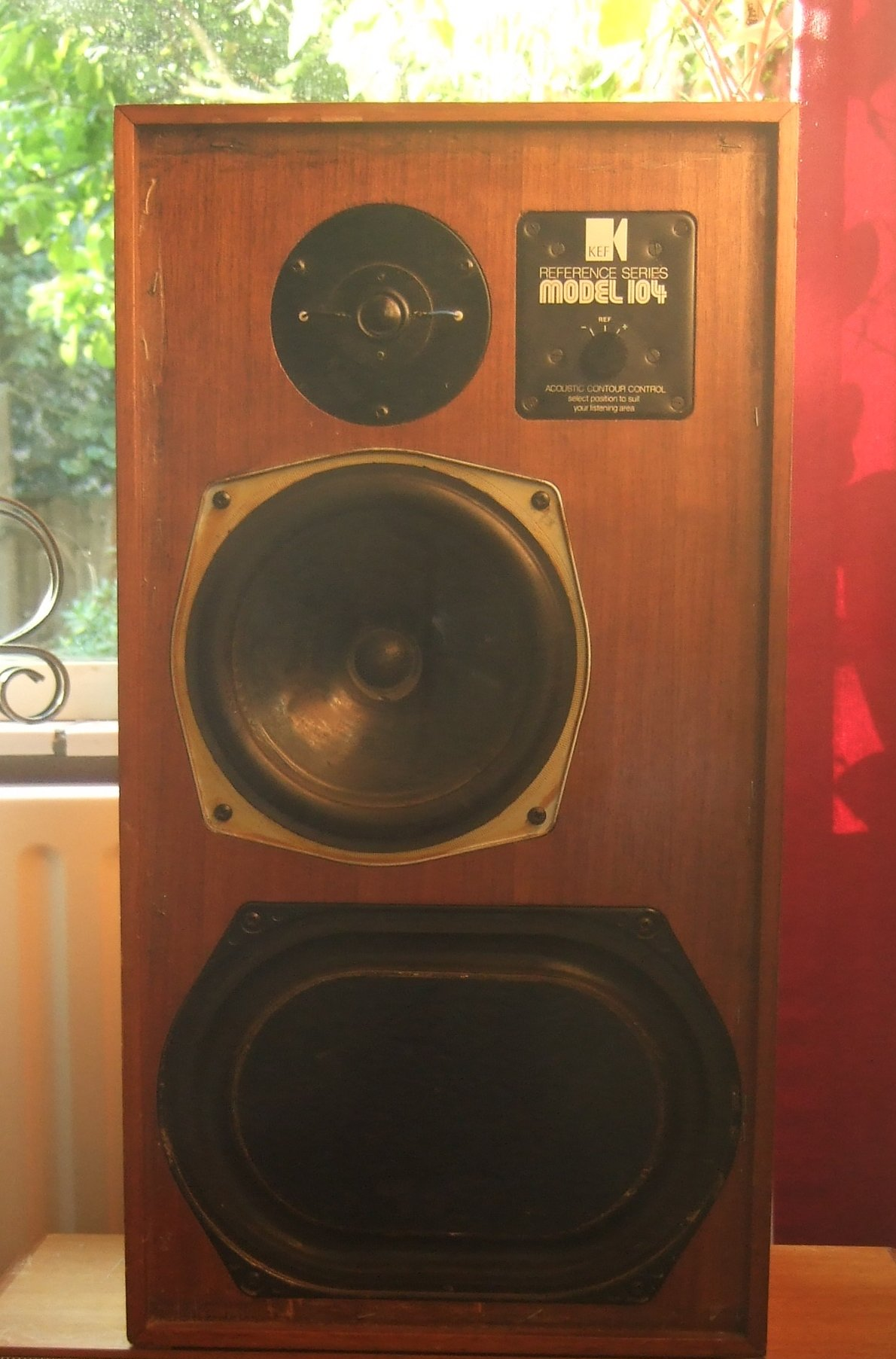
KEF 104 (1973–80)

=== Timeline ===
In the 1970s and 1980s, KEF was one of a group of British loudspeaker makers, including such companies as Bowers & Wilkins and Celestion, that pioneered the use of advanced materials and techniques in audio.

In the early 1970s, KEF became the first company to use computers for the testing and design of loudspeakers, leading to a methodology called "Total System Design". Production techniques such as driver "pair matching" were implemented in the Model 105 system, released in 1977, which was one of the most highly regarded loudspeakers of its time.

Other technologies developed and brought to the market by KEF have included:

- driver decoupling (Model 105.2, 1979), a technique of reducing cabinet coloration by mounting drivers via controlled lossy coupling
- coupled-cavity bass loading (Model 104/2, 1984), a technique of pairing two bass drive units and feeding their output via a single port
- conjugate load matching (Model 104/2, 1984), a crossover optimisation technique that presents a constant (albeit low) ohmic load to the amplifier
- the "KEF Universal Bass Equaliser" (aka "KUBE") (Model 107, 1986), a technique to overcome the unavoidable phase lag present at low frequencies
- Uni-Q (C-Series, 1988), an implementation of coincident midrange and tweeter drivers that strives to preserve phase integrity and match dispersion between the drivers, resulting in improved stereo imagery and an enlarged optimum listening area
- Acoustic Compliance Enhancement (ACE) (Muon, 2005), a technology delivering the bass performance of a conventional speaker of twice the size
- Single Apparent Source Technology (Blade, 2011), a technique of configuring speakers to cover the entire bandwidth of the loudspeaker, which enables all frequencies to appear to radiate from one single point
- Metamaterial Absorption Technology (MAT) (LS50 Meta 2020), a complex maze-like structure where each of a number of channels absorbs a specific frequency, combining to eliminate unwanted sound coming from the rear of the tweeter, thereby reducing distortion and improving sound clarity
- Uni-Core (KC62, 2021), a patent-pending technology that combines the dual force-cancelling drive units into a single motor system with the overlapping voice coils concentrically arranged, thus reducing the size of the speaker or subwoofer cabinet

=== Uni-Q Technology ===
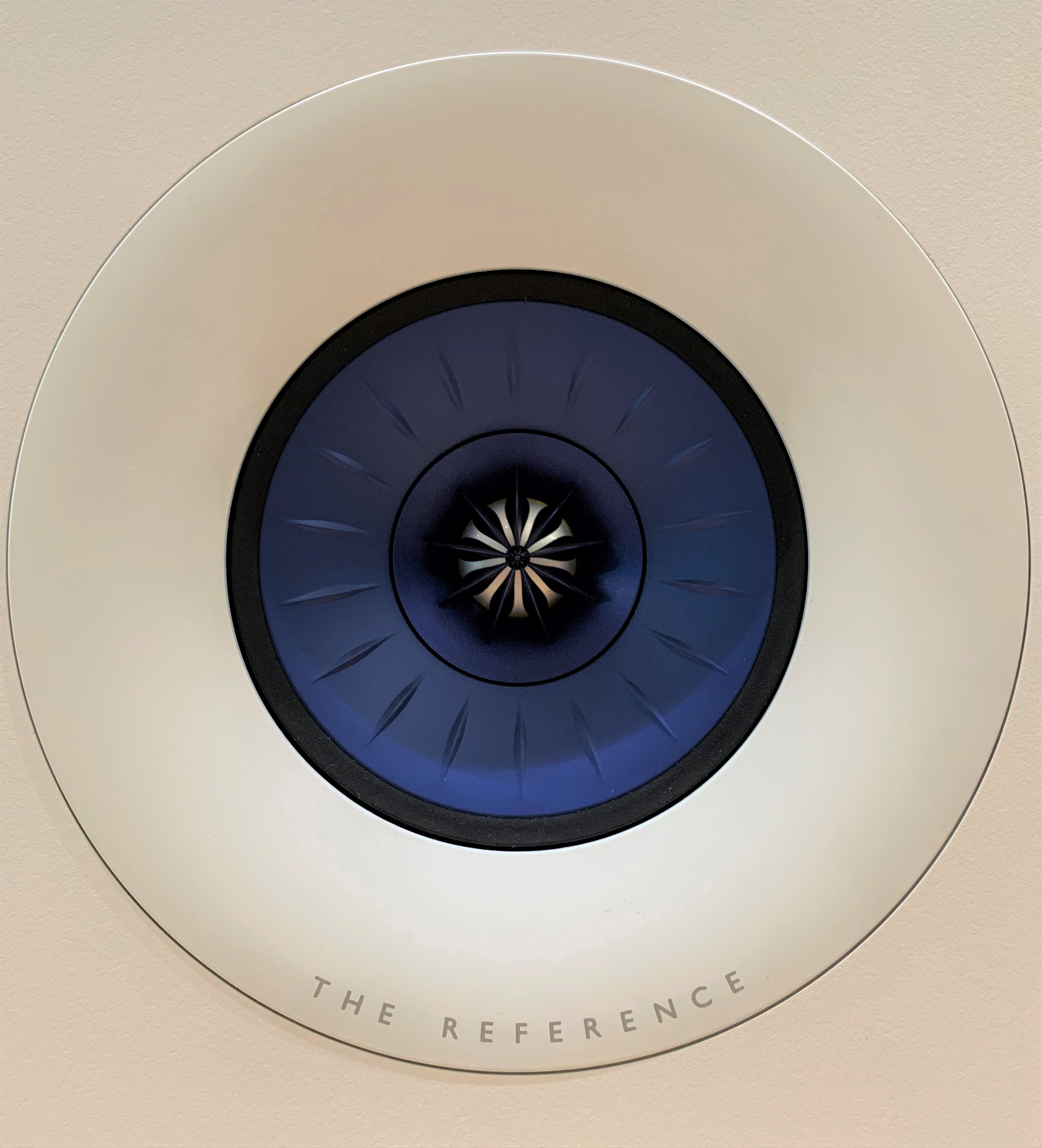
Reference 5 Meta, Uni-Q

Developed in 1988, the Uni-Q driver array combines the midrange and tweeter to avoid the driver-to-driver interference created in conventional loudspeakers where mid and high frequencies radiate from different locations. Uni-Q places the tweeter at the centre of the bass/midrange cone, dispersing the different frequencies from a single point source, a design intended to reduce interference and deliver a more accurate and realistic sound than is possible in conventional loudspeakers.

=== Metamaterial Absorption Technology (MAT) ===
Metamaterials are materials engineered to have properties that are typically not found in naturally occurring substances and that derive not from the properties of the base materials but from their arrangement as intricate structures. KEF was the first loudspeaker manufacturer to deploy such materials in Hi-Fi speakers. MAT is a maze-like structure where each of the intricate channels absorbs a specific frequency. Sitting behind the tweeter, it absorbs unwanted sound radiating from the rear of the driver, reducing distortion and preventing audio distraction. The technology was declared Innovation of the Year in the 2020 What Hi-Fi? Awards, with the products using it being named Product of the Year in two categories.

=== Uni-Core Technology ===
Uni-Core technology combines two force-cancelling drivers into a single motor system. Overlapping voice coils, of different diameters and concentrically arranged, allow for more output and depth to be delivered from a small cabinet. The first product with this technology, the KC62 subwoofer (2021), is the size of a football. It received Best in Category awards from EISA and StereoNET.

=== Single Apparent Source Technology ===
KEF's Single Apparent Source Technology is intended to eliminate the interference caused by the interaction of drivers producing different frequencies, by ensuring that the entire frequency range radiates from a single point. The aim is to create a highly accurate sound across a wider area. To achieve this, four low-frequency drivers, in symmetrically opposing pairs, are placed around a two-way driver where the mid-frequency and high-frequency share the same acoustic centre. When implemented in the Concept Blade in 2011, KEF called that the world's first Single Apparent Source loudspeaker.

== Products ==
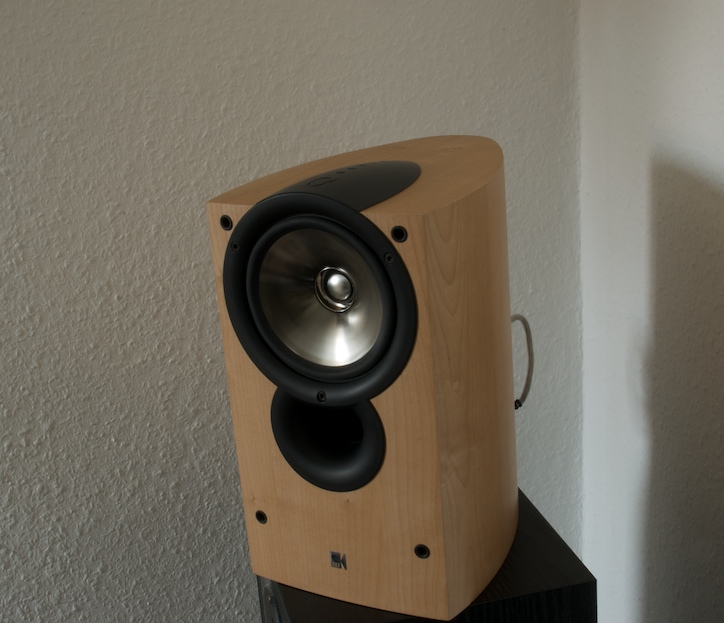
KEF iQ1 (2008)

=== Hi-Fi speakers ===
- Muon
- Blade and Blade 2 Meta
- The Reference
- R Series
- Q Series
- LS50 Meta
- T Series

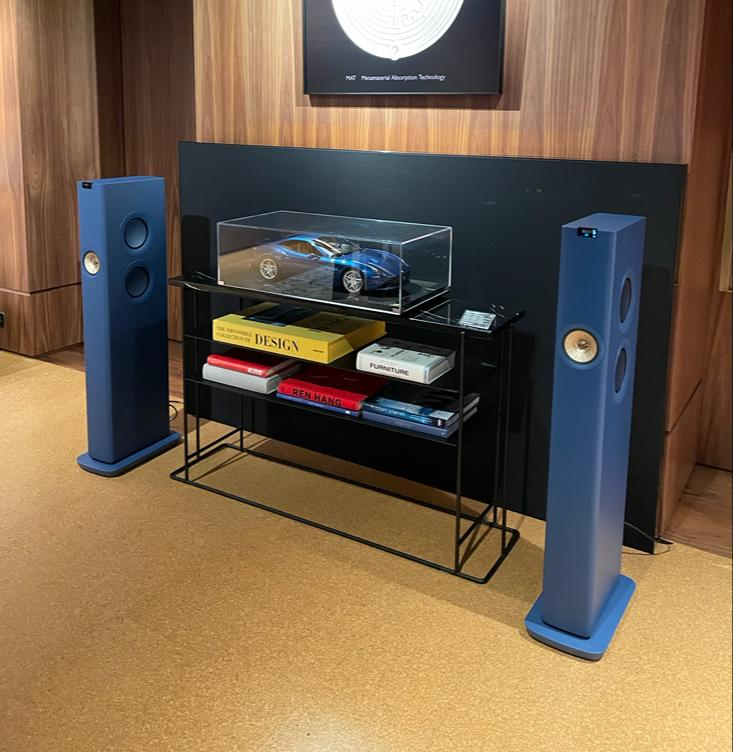
KEF LS60 Wireless Royal Blue designed by Michael Young (2022)

=== Wireless Hi-Fi speakers ===
- LS60 Wireless
- LS50 Wireless LS50 Wireless II
- LSX
- LSX 'Soundwave Edition'
- LSX II
- LSX II LT Coda W
- EGG Duo

=== Headphones ===
- Mu3 TWS
- Mu7 Over-Ear

=== Subwoofers ===
- Reference 8b
- KF92
- KC62
- KUBE
- T2

=== Architectural ===
- THX Extreme Home Theatre
  - In-wall speakers
  - In-ceiling speakers
- Outdoor speakers
