= CN Logistics International =

Hong Kong-based logistics company

- Company type: Public
- Traded as: SEHK: 2130
- Industry: Logistics
- Founded: 1991
- Founder: John Lau Shek Yau
- Headquarters: Hong Kong
- Website: www.cnlogistics.com.hk

CN Logistics International is a Hong Kong–based logistics company.

== History ==
CN Logistics International was founded by John Lau in 1991, who previously worked for Dodwell & Co., as Cargo Services Far East in 1989, now its parent company. It imports around 30 percent of fine wine in Hong Kong and has established a business-to-consumer (B2C) platform called CNShip4Shop.

In 2020, the company was listed on the Hong Kong Stock Exchange after raising $153 million.

CN Logistics launched two e-commerce platforms: PJF Wines in 2021 and "CNShip4Shop" in 2022. The former is for distributing imported wines in China, while the latter extends the company's e-fulfillment services outside China.
