= Gold Peak =

Hong-Kong based battery manufacturer

Gold Peak Technology Group Limited
- Native name: 金山科技工業有限公司
- Type: Public
- Traded as: SEHK: 40
- Industry: Electronics industry
- Founded: 1964; 62 years ago
- Key people: Victor Lo; Brian Li; Michael Lam; Waltery Law; Christopher Lau
- Products: Battery and battery-related products, electronics and acoustics products
- Number of employees: 6,650 (as of 2023)
- Website: www.goldpeak.com

Gold Peak Technology Group Limited, formerly Gold Peak Industries (Holdings) Limited, is a Hong Kong–based multinational corporation which is established in 1964 and has been listed on the Hong Kong Stock Exchange since 1984. The Group has built brand names for its major product categories, such as GP and GP Recyko batteries, Voniko batteries, and acquired existing brands KEF and Celestion speakers.

Gold Peak employs a work force of about 6,650 worldwide. The Group occupies a total floor area of approximately 633,000 square metres, covering its five manufacturing and sales offices in the UK, Thailand, Malaysia, China, and Vietnam, as well as marketing and sales offices in over 10 countries in Asia, Europe, and Americas.

Gold Peak Technology Group Limited currently holds approximately 86% interest in GP Industries, which is publicly listed in Singapore.

== History ==
=== Ningbo Battery ===
In 2002, GP Batteries acquired 75% of Zhongyin (Ningbo) Battery Co. Ltd, also known as Ningbo Battery and was headquartered in Ningbo, which had a major market presence in China via its Pairdeer brand. Through this subsidiary they also own the Voniko brand and additionally use the Sonluk brand.

In March 2022, the company changed its name to Gold Peak Technology Group Limited to reflect its business strategy and direction in advanced technologies and manufacturing of batteries and electronics, and its investment strategies in R&D, innovation, design and brands.

== Cadmium exposure incident ==
In 2004, GP Batteries were found to have caused excessive cadmium exposure, even cadmium poisoning, in a large number of mainland Chinese workers. Ten cases of poisoning have been recorded on the mainland and four in Hong Kong, while the total number with cadmium levels exceeding safety limits has surpassed 400. Affected individuals have exhibited symptoms including dizziness, fatigue, impaired sense of smell, and pain in the lower back and limbs.

On 23 July 2004, more than 40 labour and human rights groups protested at the headquarters of GP Batteries. The organizations included the Globalisation Monitor, the Hong Kong Christian Industrial Committee, and the Hong Kong Confederation of Trade Unions. Deputy general manager of GP Batteries, Brenda Lee Wong Yuk-wan, responded that out of 1,000 employees tested, 400 were found to have "higher than normal" cadmium levels, but 2,000 in mainland China remained untested.

In 2006 more than 100 female factory workers in southern China attempted to sue their former employers (GP) over suspected cadmium poisoning. It is reported that workers at GP factories have been routinely exposed to dust of cadmium, an extremely toxic metal used in the manufacture of Nickel-cadmium batteries that can cause kidney failure, cancer, and bone disease.

On 24 August 2010, over a hundred workers protested outside GP's factory in Huizhou. GP had promised compensation to workers affected by poisoning but severely reduced the negotiated amount, making a "take it or leave it" offer.

Karin Mak's documentary Red Dust follows female workers fighting for medical care from their former employer, China's GP Batteries factory, after suffering years of cadmium poisoning.

== Subsidiaries ==
=== GP Industries Limited ===
GP Industries is mainly engaged in the development, manufacture and marketing of electronics and acoustics products, including KEF and Celestion loudspeakers after acquiring the British companies. The wholly owned subsidiary, GP Batteries International Limited, specializes in the design and production of batteries and related products.

=== GP Batteries International Limited ===
GP Batteries manufactures and markets batteries and battery-related products including primary batteries, rechargeable batteries and accessories. GP Batteries is one of Asia's largest battery manufacturers, supplying battery products to original equipment manufacturers, battery companies as well as consumer retail markets under the GP brand name.

The company stated its commitment in environmental conservation and roadmap for sustainable operation. A number of its manufacturing plants received UL Zero Waste of Landfill Validation, and six plants in Malaysia, Vietnam and China have achieved Gold Level validation; the facility in Tebrau, Malaysia is the first plant in the country to earn this validation.

=== GP Energy Tech Limited ===
GP Energy Tech is a member of Gold Peak Technology Group and focuses on rechargeable battery design and manufacturing.
