= William Errington (priest) =

William Errington (17 July 1716 – 28 September 1768) was an English Roman Catholic priest, and founder of Sedgley Park School.

== Life ==
He was son of Mark Errington of Wiltshire, a descendant of the Erringtons of Walwick Grange, Northumberland; his mother's maiden name was Martha Baker. In 1737 he went to Douai, took the mission oath 28 December 1741, and was ordained a priest in December, 1747. If he acted as professor at Douai after his ordination, as is generally stated, it could only have been for a very short time, as he left there for England, 26 March 1748.

On arrival in London he took up his residence with Bishop Richard Challoner, then coadjutor to Bishop Benjamin Petre. Kirk states that Dr. Challoner "had a high opinion of Mr. Errington, both as an active and zealous missionary and as a man of business". It was on account of these qualities that when the bishop wished to found a good school in England he induced Errington to undertake the work.

Errington made three unsuccessful attempts, the first in Buckinghamshire, the second in Wales, and the third at Betley near Newcastle-under-Lyne, in Staffordshire, before he succeeded in founding a permanent school at Sedgley Park in the neighbourhood of Wolverhampton. On Lady-Day, 1763, he opened this school with twelve boys brought in covered wagon from Betley. The mansion, known as the Park Hall, was till then the residence of John, Lord Ward, afterwards Viscount Dudley and Ward. The foundation was at once attacked in Parliament, but Lord Dudley successfully defended himself.

The school was not interfered with; it developed into the Sedgley Park School which existed for over a century, and was succeeded by St. Wilfrid's College, Oakmoor, near Cheadle. Having founded the school, Errington's work there was done, and as soon as he secured the appointment of Hugh Kendall as head-master in May, 1763, he returned to Bishop Challoner in London. He was appointed archdeacon and treasurer of the Old Chapter and held these offices till his death.
