= Ross Lovegrove =

British industrial designer (born 1958)

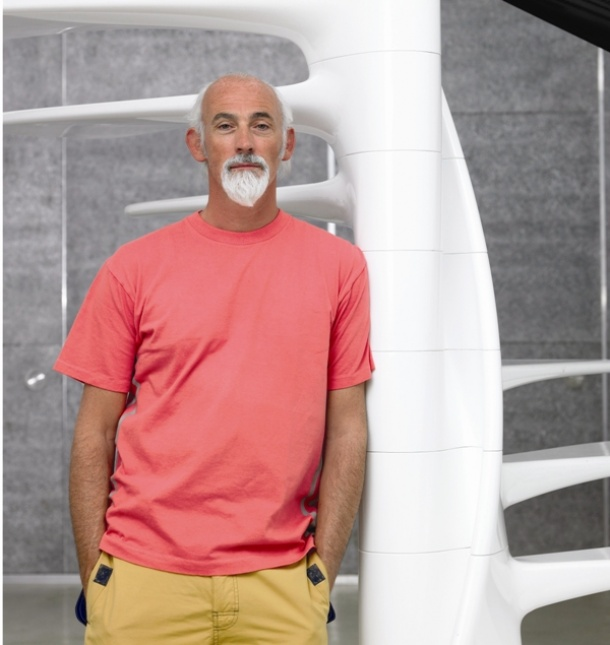
- Lovegrove in 2007
- Born: 1958 (age 67–68); Cardiff, Wales
- Education: Manchester Polytechnic
- Occupation: Industrial Designer
- Website: rosslovegrove.com

Ross Lovegrove (born 1958 in Cardiff, Wales) is a Welsh artist and industrial designer.

== Biography ==
Ross Lovegrove was born in Wales in 1958. He studied at Manchester Polytechnic (now Manchester Metropolitan University), graduating with a First Class BA in Industrial Design in 1980. In 1983, he graduated from the Royal College of Art with a Master of Design.

In the early 1980s he worked with Hartmut Esslinger as a designer for Frog Design on projects such as Walkmans for Sony, and computers for Apple Computer; he later moved to Paris to work for Knoll International, and also collaborated with Jean Nouvel and Phillipe Stark. in the late 1980s, he returned to London, and in 1990 he founded a practice of his own, Studio X.

In 2007 he designed a limited edition speaker system called Muon for the British audio company KEF.

He has designed concept cars for Renault and Swarovski.

In April 2017 the Pompidou Centre in Paris staged a retrospective of his work titled CONVERGENCE in the context of the museum's fortieth anniversary. Also in 2017, the London Design Festival commissioned a piece by Lovegrove that was installed in the Victoria and Albert Museum.

His work has been exhibited internationally, and is held in the permanent collection of institutions including the Metropolitan Museum of Art and the Museum of Modern Art (MoMA) in New York, the Vitra Design Museum in Germany, and the Design Museum in London.

== Personal life ==
Ross Lovegrove was raised in Penarth by parents who were first cousins and who both hold the name Lovegrove.

== Gallery ==
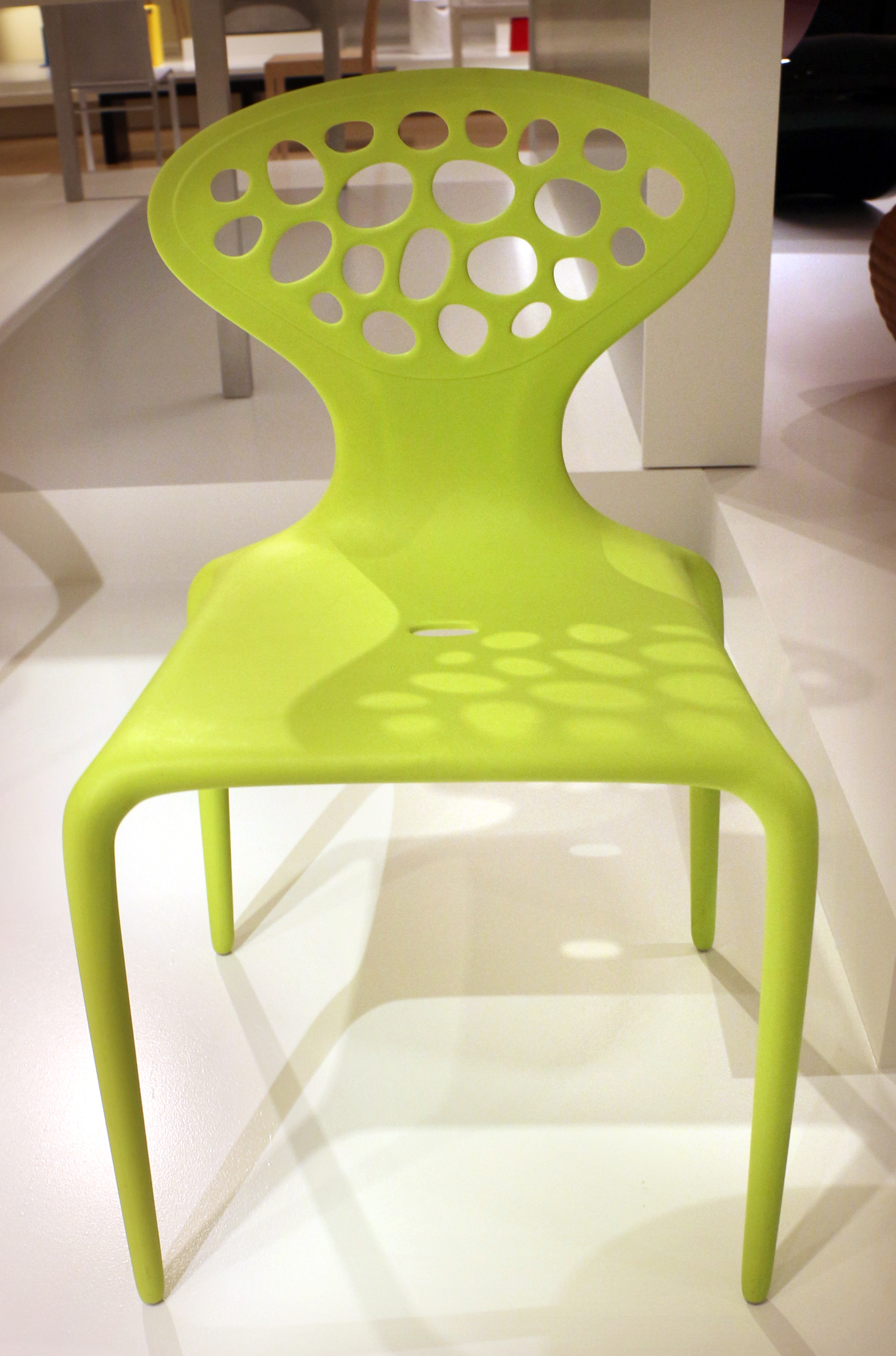
Supernatural chair designed for Moroso (2005)

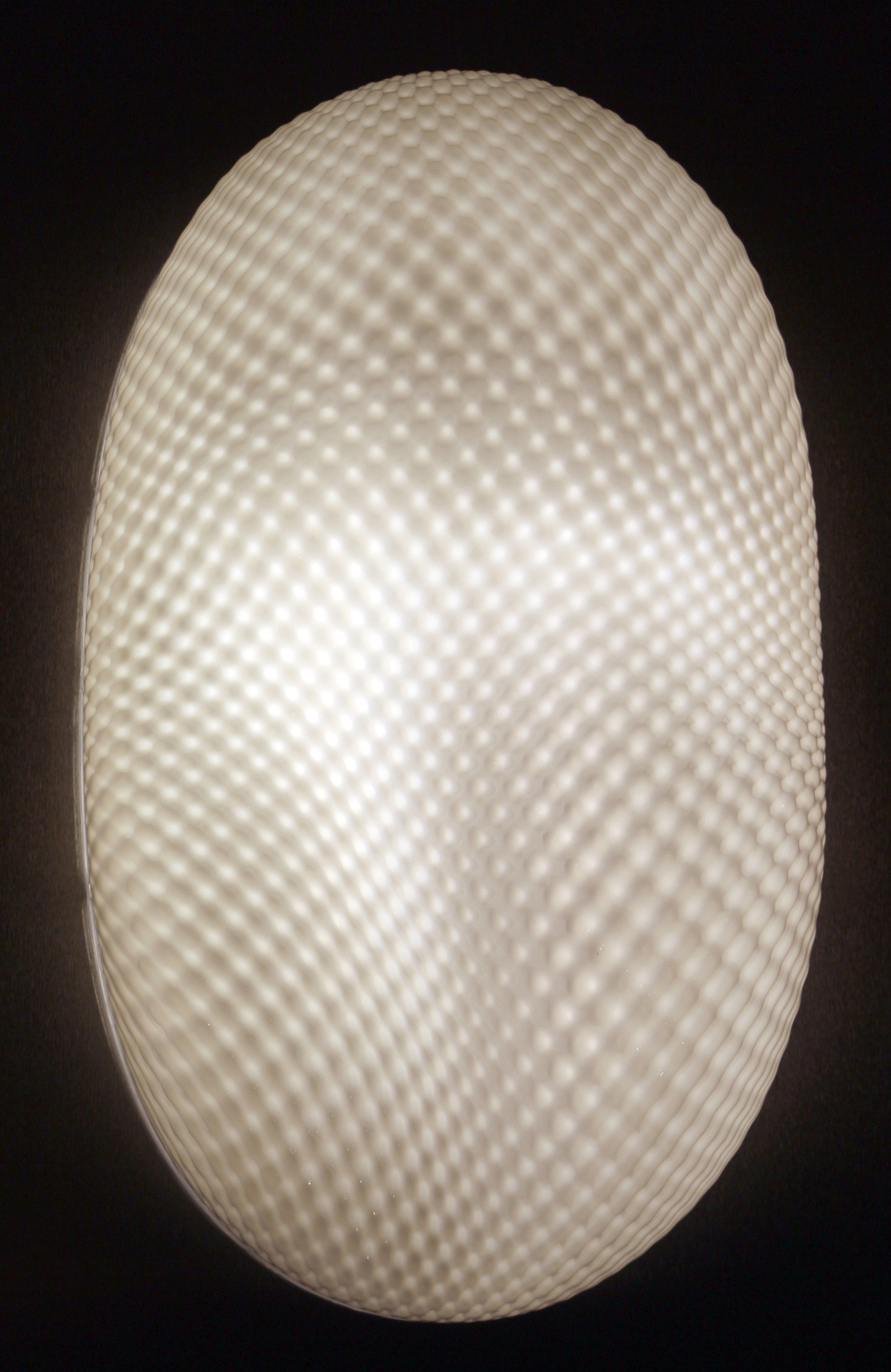
Cosmic landscape wall sconce designed for Artemide (2010)

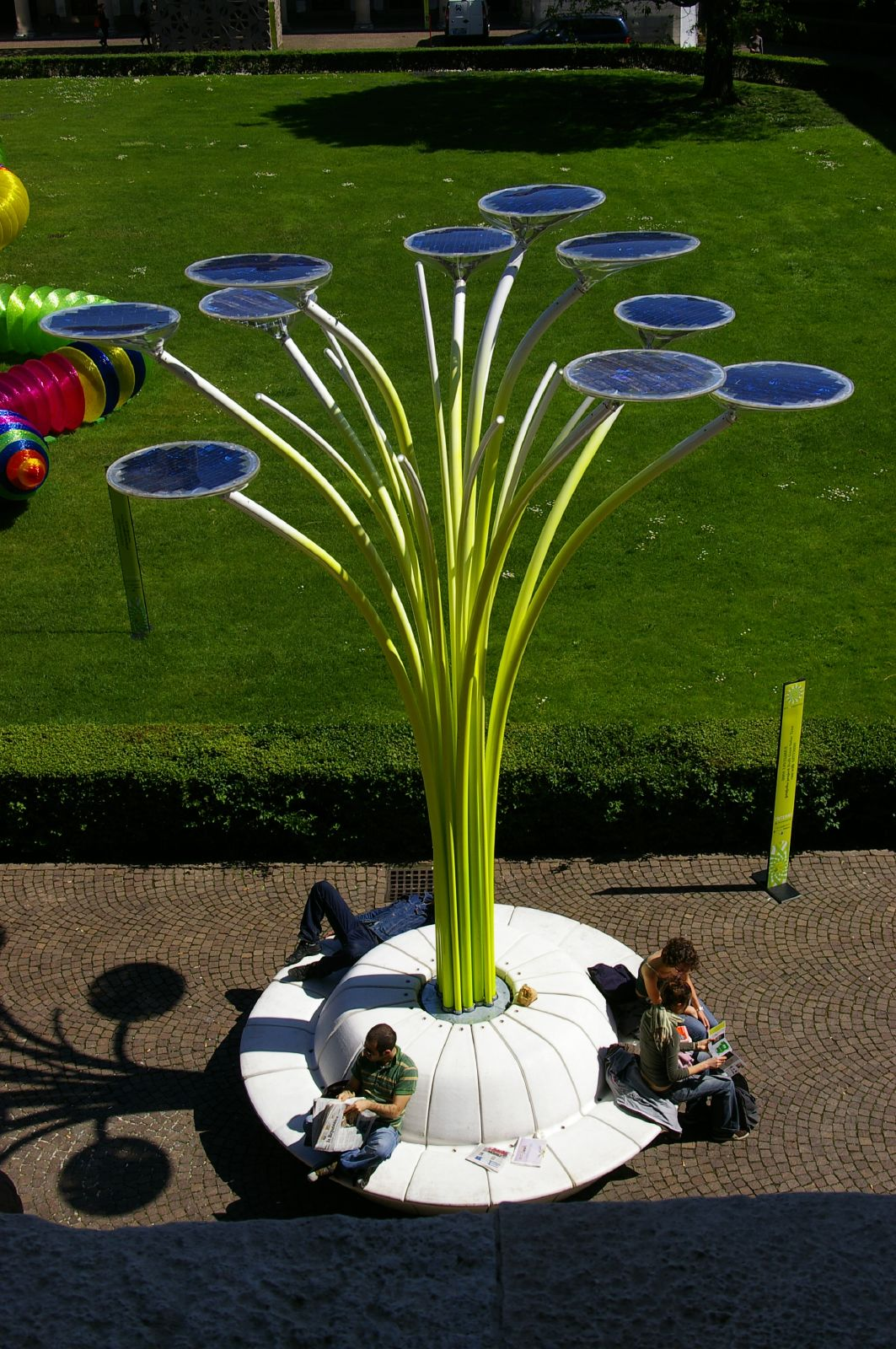
Solar Tree

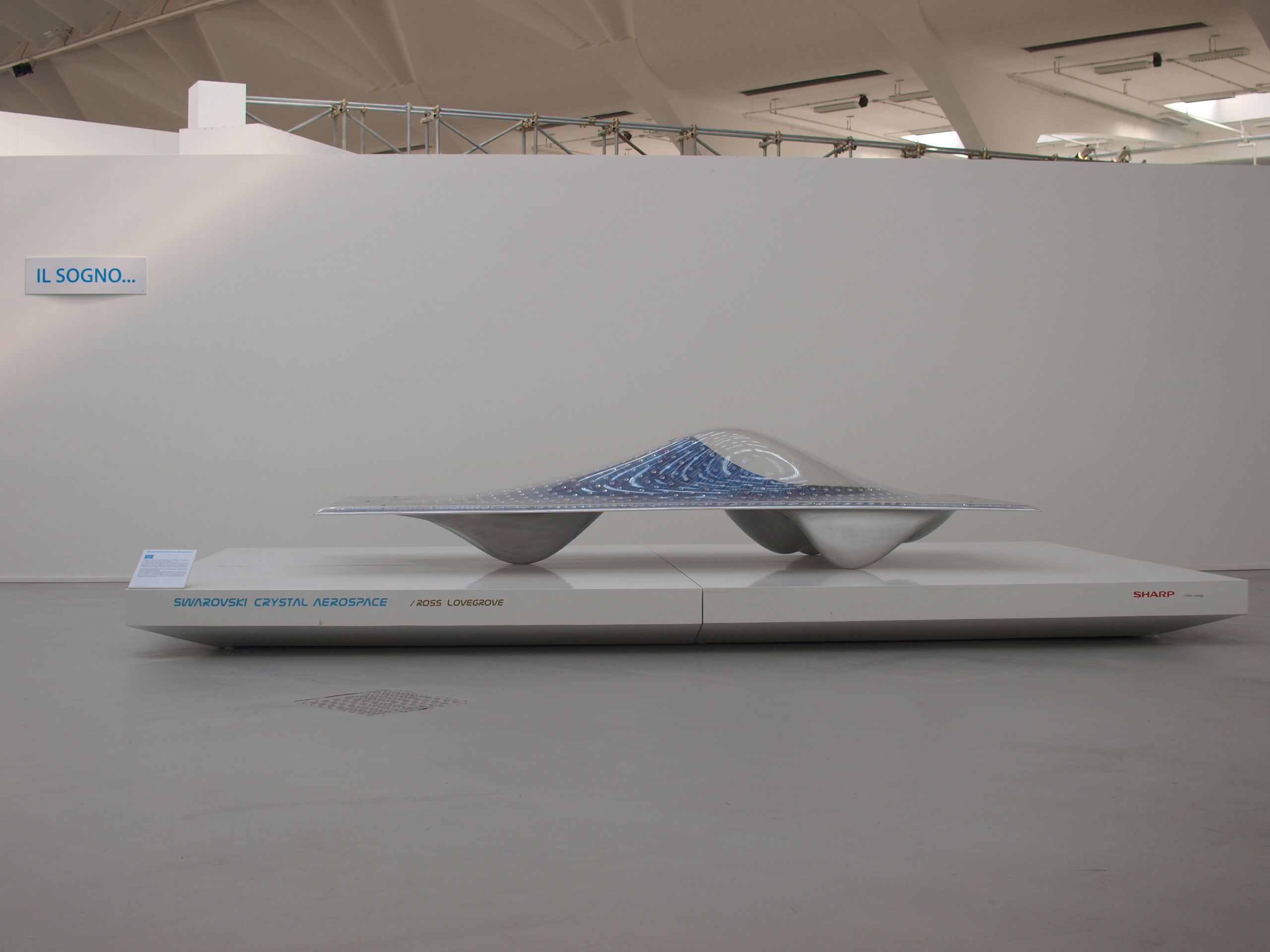
Swarovski Ross Lovegrove concept car (2006)

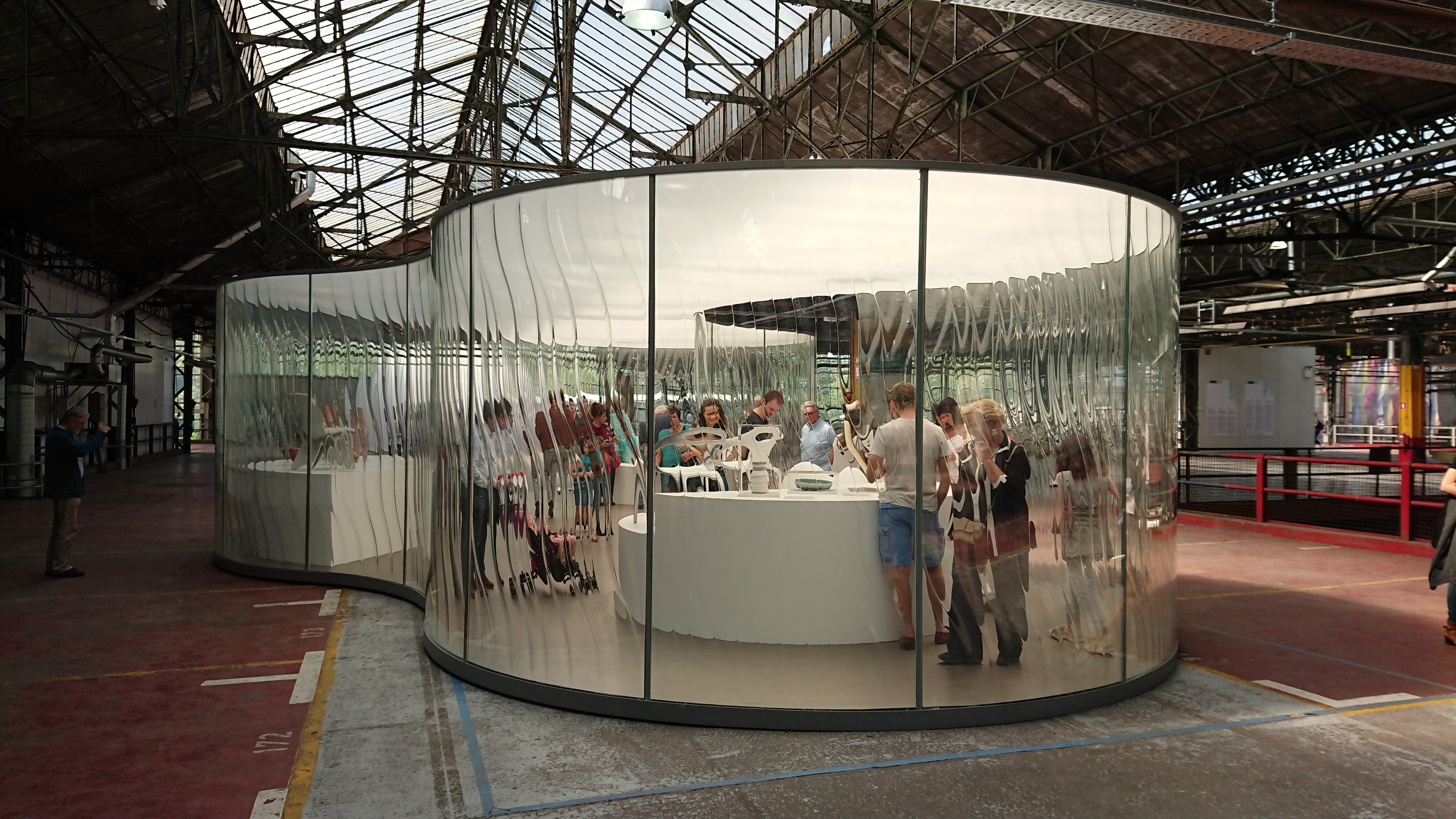
Ross Lovegrove Pavillon (2012)

== Awards ==
- Curated the first permanent collection. The same year, he was awarded the Red dot design award for the products created for VitrA

== Exhibitions ==
- Solo show at Philips de Pury & Company, New York, March 2017
- Solo show at Centre Pompidou, Paris, France, 12 April – 3 July 2017
