= William Mong =

Hong Kong businessman (died 2010)

William Mong Man-wai GBS (Chinese: 蒙民偉, 7 November 1927 – 20 July 2010) was the chairman of the Shun Hing Group, the distributor of Matsushita products (National, Panasonic, Technics) in Hong Kong.

He attended La Salle College in Hong Kong. Mong Man-wai died from cancer on 20 July 2010, aged 82. Many buildings in Hong Kong universities are named after him.
