= Celestion =

British loudspeaker manufacturer

- Type: Public
- Industry: Audio
- Founded: 1924; 102 years ago
- Headquarters: Ipswich, England, U.K.
- Area served: Worldwide
- Products: loudspeakers
- Number of employees: ~50
- Parent: Gold Peak
- Website: Company website

Celestion is a British designer and exporter of professional loudspeakers.

== History ==
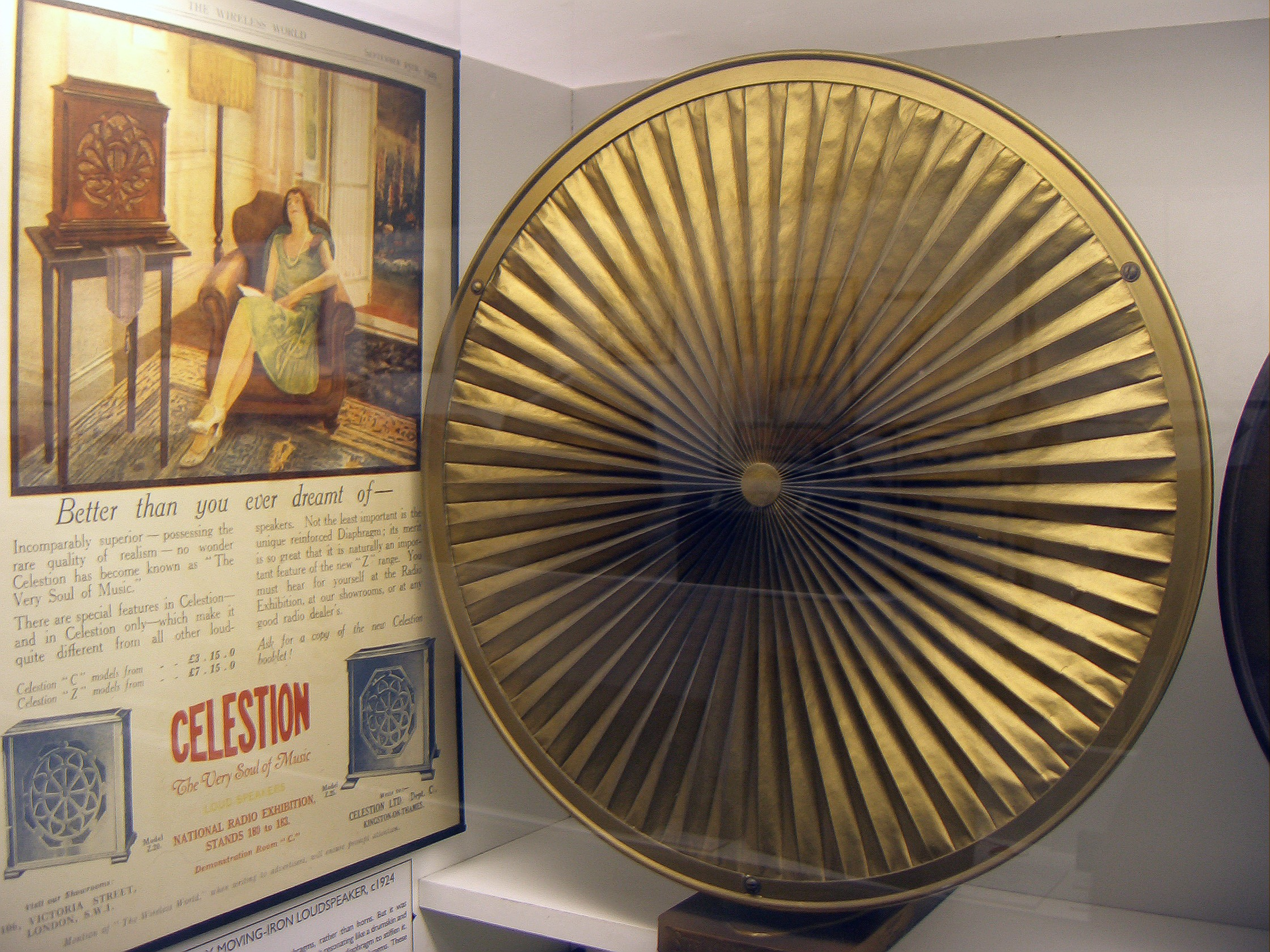
Mid-1920s Celestion radio loudspeaker, Science Museum, London, South Kensington

=== Origins ===
What became Celestion was started in Hampton Wick (suburban London) in 1924. Cyril French and his three brothers had taken over a plating works and established the Electrical Manufacturing and Plating Company. They were listed as "electrical instrument manufacturers". Eric Mackintosh approached Cyril French for assistance with improving a new loudspeaker he had already filed a patent for (British Patent No. 230,552 on 15 December 1923, issued 16 March 1925). The BBC had started their programme in November 1922 and was building up new senders, public interest in radio broadcasting grew rapidly. But listeners still needed to connect either earphones or gramophone horns to the first radio receivers. Installing a loudspeaker sensitive enough in decorative cabinets quickly made these sought-after pieces of furniture in the Roaring Twenties. French and Mackintosh perfected the design, the modified French/Mackintosh model used a clamped edge, its conical paper diaphragm was strengthened with strips of Chinese bamboo (British Patent No. 245,704, filed 24 October 1925, issued 14 January 1926). Cyril French became the driving force of the endeavour to start manufacturing it in his company.

The first housed loudspeaker, Celestion, was launched in early 1925. Customers had a choice of oak, walnut or mahogany for the enclosure. One of French's brothers, Ralph, devised the name of the new product. He was also in charge of the cabinet designs and advertising, the two other brothers continued the plating business. A complete range with the models A1, A2, A3, A4 and A5 was introduced soon, and a subsidiary in Paris was formed, Constable-Celestion, to export first speakers. In 1927 the Celestion Radio Company and Celestion Ltd. were formed, which grew and became highly successful quickly. The new models C10, C12, C14 and C24 were brought to market, especially the C10 and C12 were highly praised. For many years Celestion advertising would carry the phrase "The very Soul of Music". In 1929 Celestion Ltd. moved across the Thames to Kingston upon Thames, now listed as "Gramophone Works".

In 1931 the C range of loudspeakers were supplemented by the new models D10, D12 and D50. Technological improvements meant Celestion had to stay up to date. The first electrical disc-playing machines appeared on the market in the late 1920s. These electric "phonographs" (since the 1940s known as record players, or nowadays as turntables) became more widespread, later to be combined with a radio receiver. Also in the 1930s receivers became more sophisticated and smaller, loudspeakers now were being built into the receiver cabinet itself, thus a separate unit was not necessary anymore. Many ingenious ideas were incorporated in new designs in order to raise the quality of sound reproduction, such as the Celestion Reetone and Reetone Dual matched speaker units. The former incorporated two equal-sized speakers with a transformer, the matched units were staggered. This eliminated the tendency to "boom" greatly, because the bass could be better suppressed. The latter had large and small speakers built in and a transformer. The two units were so coupled that the treble was accepted by the treble unit and the bass by the bass unit, being essentially a two-way, crossover-less splitting system. In 1932 Celestion brought the Ppm Permanent Magnet Moving Coil Speaker to market.

The business was hit hard by the Great Depression, like so many. Furthermore, in 1934 the British Rola Company, a dependence of the U.S. Rola Company of Cleveland, Ohio, opened in London. Rola being another loudspeaker manufacturer with similar products, the two companies began competing for home and export markets. In 1935 Cyril French resigned from the board of Celestion Ltd, Eric Mackintosh also left in the early 1930s.

With the 1940s wartime restrictions forced Celestion and the British Rola to produce loudspeakers to the same specification, the utility "W" type. Micro Precision Products, later a camera maker, was formed as a subsidiary during the war. British Rola bought Celestion in 1947 and moved production to Thames Ditton a year later. The name of the company now changed to Rola Celestion, with its products sold under the brand name Celestion. The company continued making radio, "high fidelity", and television speakers in the postwar years. In 1949, Rola Celestion was bought by Truvox, a public address system manufacturer.

In 1968 Celestion started production in Ipswich, Suffolk, moving all manufacturing there by 1975. The firm merged with a clothing company in 1970, and the result was now named Celestion Industries, which in turn became Celestion International Ltd. in 1979.

In 1992 the loudspeaker part of the business (Celestion International) was sold to Kinergetics Holdings (UK) Ltd., which also bought the company KEF.

=== Currently ===
Today Celestion International and KEF together form Gold Peak Acoustics UK. In 2006 Celestion ceased to manufacture finished professional audio systems and consumer hi-fi / home cinema products, and now focuses on the design and manufacture of lead guitar, bass guitar, professional audio and sound reinforcement speakers.

== Notable products ==
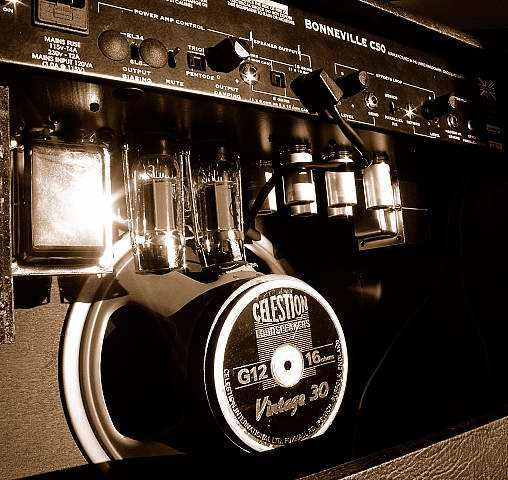
Celestion G12 / Vintage 30 speaker unit on guitar amp

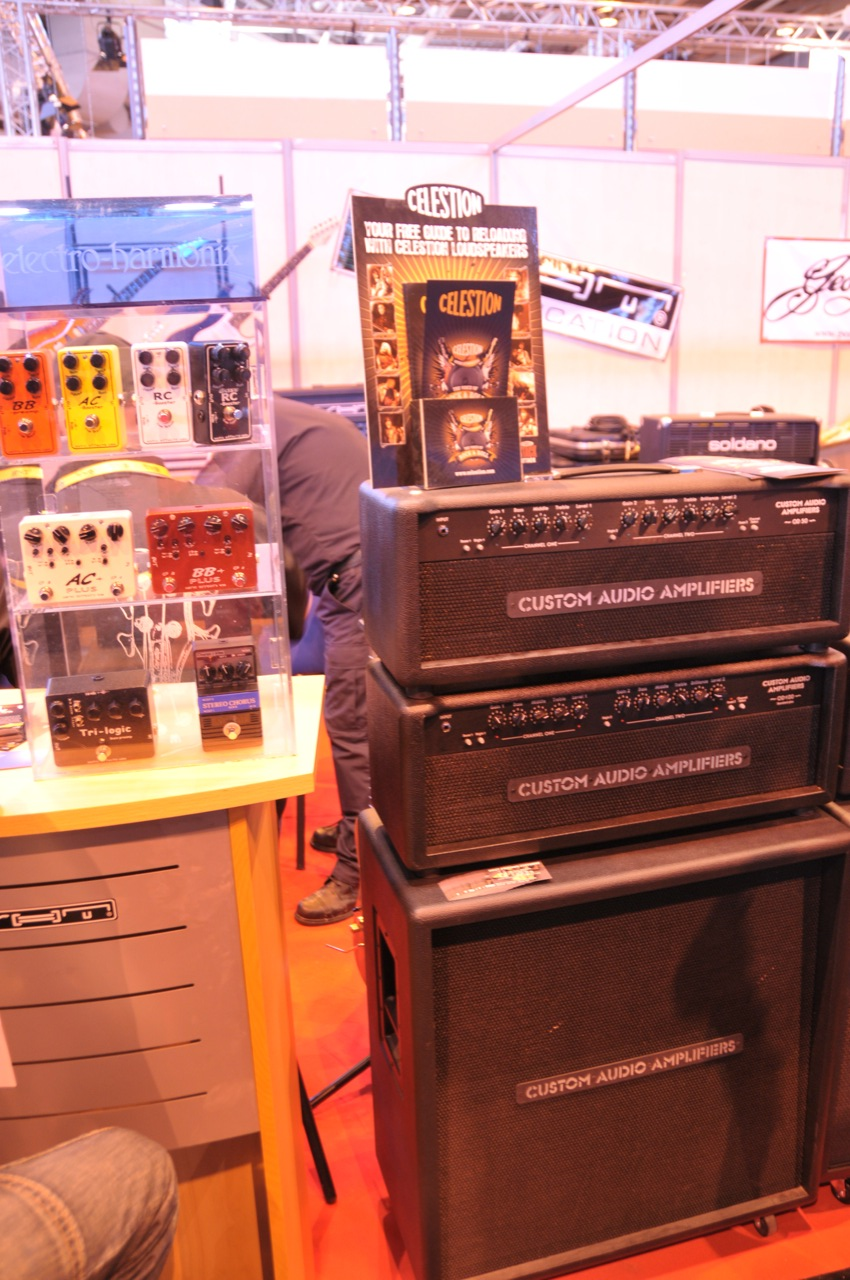
Celestion speaker options offered by guitar amp manufacturer

=== Consumer audio equipment ===
Somewhere around 1969 the Celestion Ditton range of consumer stereo teak veneered floor speakers was unleashed on the British public. The range would go on to include smaller bookshelf models, but initially the lowest model was the very popular Ditton 15, to be renamed the 15XR (see the catalogue from 1978), and the top of the range was the formidable and always rare Ditton 66. Most models, including these two, featured ported cabinets and passive full size Auxiliary Bass Radiators (ABRs) which gave out controlled low frequencies. The 15 had 8" drivers (1 regular and 1 ABR), and the 66 had 12" similarly.

Celestion consumer speakers 1978

In 1981 Celestion built the hi-fi box model SL6, a compact two-way loudspeaker with a single-piece metal dome tweeter made of copper and a cone-shaped bass unit of PVC with integrated dustcap. Both speaker drivers designed with the help of laser interferometry. Afterwards followed the model SL600, which won worldwide awards in the audiophile hi-fi scene. Instead of wood for the loudspeaker enclosure a rigid honeycomb alloy called Aerolam was chosen, a material previously used only in the aerospace industry. Then followed versions with aluminium dome tweeter, designated as SL6s in standard cabinets (MDF and wood veneer), and the SL6si with an improved audio crossover and woofer surround. Aluminium-domed models using the Aerolam cabinet were the models SL700, and SL700SE with dual inputs. Another of the copper-domed versions, with Aerolam cabinet, dual inputs and improved crossover elements, was marketed as the SL600si.

The speakers of the SL model range were generally well regarded for their natural sound and wide sound dispersion, and a detailed mid and bass range. Their tweeters produced very clear voices, good especially for vocal and classical music recordings. But the copper dome versions were also known for a somewhat "depressed" sounding high-frequency range, due to the relatively heavy material. Later versions used an aluminium diaphragm dome. This lighter and more efficient driver provided an output now more balanced with the mid-range part the woofer presented, which in the first version had lacked of bass to better connect to the tweeter frequencies.

In 1986 Celestion introduced the System 6000, a double-dipole subwoofer system with active audio crossover to complement and enhance the SL series. In 1992 the Model 100, a final variation of the SL design, came to market. It featured a conventional, but highly refined MDF / wood veneer cabinet, dual inputs, updated mounted plates, improved audio crossover and woofer design, and a variation of the aluminium tweeter with an updated faceplate. The Celestion Kingston was introduced in 1995 as an evolution of the SL family. The innovative speaker case is made from Alphacrystal, a stone/resin mould. It tapers to the rear in a way that there is no traditional back panel anymore.

In 1989 the Celestion 3 with metal dome tweeter was introduced. It set new performance standards for low-cost quality hi-fi loudspeakers, highly acclaimed by both public and critics. The later 3 Mark II model was awarded the "1994/95 European Loudspeaker of the Year" by the European Imaging and Sound Association.

=== Professional audio equipment ===
According to the company the Celestion Blue, the model G12 T530 driver, was the world's first dedicated guitar loudspeaker. The 1950s emergence of louder guitar amplifiers created a need for a rugged, reliable loudspeaker. Celestion responded by modifying their standard "G12" radio speaker. The tonal character, combined with valve amp circuits of the time, helped to define the electric guitar sound. It was rapidly adopted by pioneers of rock & roll and popular music throughout the late 1950s and early 1960s.

In 1984 the Sidewinder range of guitar speakers were unveiled. These were endowed with a special edgewound aluminium voice coil – a process developed to maximise the ratio of motor strength to mass which resulted in very high efficiency designs.

In 1986 Celestion introduced its B15 and B18 range of double suspension public address systems, with power ratings up to 1,000 Watts. In 1987 the SR (Sound Reinforcement) loudspeaker series with integral aluminium dome followed.

A number of companies use Celestion speakers, including Orange Music Electronic Company, Fender Musical Instrument Corporation, Vox, and Marshall Amps.

In June 2019, Celestion selected Sensey Electronics as its distribution partner in Mexico, to represent its entire range of pro audio and MI products.

In September 2019, Celestion announced the launch of the F12-X200 guitar loudspeaker, the first speaker designer specifically for use with profiling amps, modeling software, impulse responses and other technologies which are designed for emulating the tones from guitar amps and speaker cabinets.
