= Cotton, Staffordshire =

Village in Staffordshire, England

Coordinates: 53.0144°N 1.9023°W

Cotton
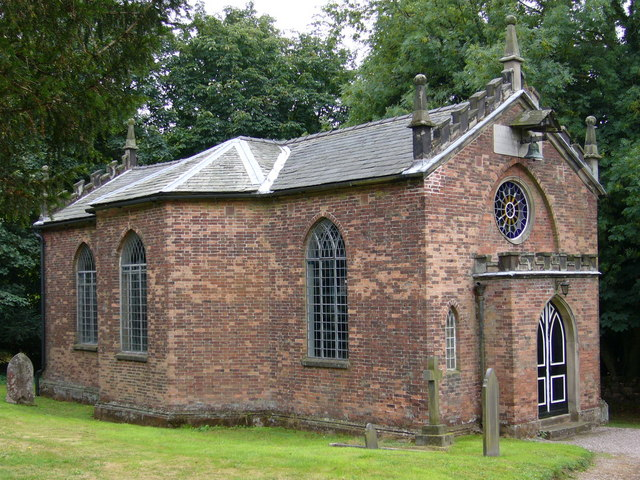
- Church of St John the Baptist, Cotton

- Location within Staffordshire
- OS grid reference: SK066463
- District: Staffordshire Moorlands
- Shire county: Staffordshire
- Region: West Midlands
- Country: England
- Sovereign state: United Kingdom
- Post town: Stoke-on-Trent
- Postcode district: ST10
- Dialling code: 01538
- Police: Staffordshire
- Fire: Staffordshire
- Ambulance: West Midlands
- UK Parliament: Staffordshire Moorlands

Cotton is a village and civil parish in Staffordshire, England. It is about 5 miles (8.0 km) north-east of Cheadle.

Cotton Hall, originally built in the 17th century, was the home of Cotton College from 1863 until its closure in 1987.

== Buildings ==
=== Cotton Hall ===
Cotton Hall, which dates from 1630, was bought by Thomas Gilbert (1688–1742). His son, the politician Thomas Gilbert (c.1719–1798) inherited the building, and it was largely rebuilt. In 1844 it was bought by John Talbot, 16th Earl of Shrewsbury, and he offered it in 1846 to Frederick William Faber as a rural retreat for his small Roman Catholic community, called the Brothers of the Will of God, in Birmingham.

The community left Cotton in April 1849 to set up the London Oratory. In 1863 the building was opened as Cotton College, a Roman Catholic boarding school (previously Sedgley Park School, Wolverhampton).

There were additions to the building in 1874–75, 1886–87 and 1931–32. It is a Grade II listed building.

The school closed in 1987; since then the site has not been used.

=== St John the Baptist's Church ===
The Anglican church of St John the Baptist, in the Diocese of Lichfield, is a Grade II listed building. It was built in 1795 by Thomas Gilbert of Cotton Hall. It is built of red brick on an ashlar plinth, and has a slate roof; it has a two-bay nave and a single-bay chancel. There are wall plaques to Thomas Gilbert (died 1798) and his son Thomas (died 1843).

=== St Wilfrid's Church ===
The patron saint of the Roman Catholic community of Cotton Hall in the 1840s was St Wilfrid, and St Wilfrid's Church, for which funds were provided by the Earl of Shrewsbury, was built soon after their arrival. The architect was August Pugin, who had designed St. Giles' Catholic Church, Cheadle for the Earl of Shrewsbury. It was completed in 1848. It later became the chapel of Cotton College.

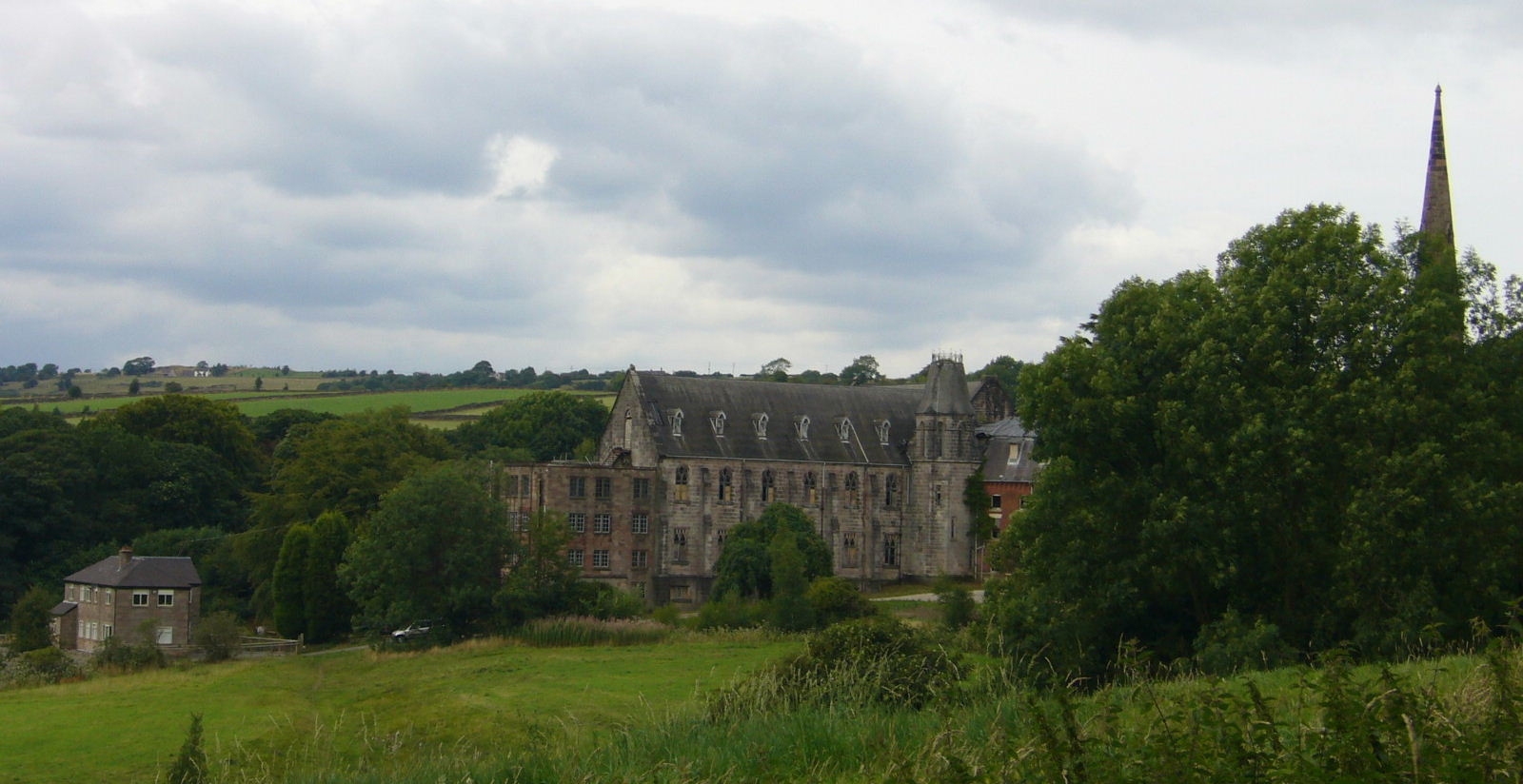
Cotton College in 2006. On the right is the spire of St Wilfrid's Church.

It is a Grade II listed building, built of local sandstone in a Gothic style of about 1300. It has a south-west tower with a broach spire. To provide space for the expanding college, there were additions in 1936–37 by the architect George Drysdale, which included extending the chancel.

After the closure of the college in 1987 the church continued to serve the local area; annual reunions of former college pupils took place at the church. Dry rot was found in the roof in 2009, and the last Mass in the church was celebrated on 24 October 2010. The building was closed in 2011.

== See also ==
- Listed buildings in Cotton, Staffordshire
- Cotton Dell
