= John Lau Shek Yau =

Hong Kong businessman

LAU Shek Yu, John 劉石
- Born: Hong Kong
- Occupations: Executive Chairman and Founder, Ecargo Holdings Limited; Chairman, JL Enterprises; Managing Director and Founder, Cargo Services Far East Limited; Managing Director, Xin Hai Hua Enterprises Limited; Director, Far East Cargo Line Limited; Executive Director, CN Logistics International Holdings Limited
- Board member of: CS Logistics Holdings Ltd; Ecargo Holdings Limited (ASX: ECG)
- Spouse: Shelley Lee (m. 1971; div. 2000)

John Lau Shek Yu (Chinese: 劉石佑) is a Hong Kong entrepreneur and logistics tycoon. Lau is the executive chairman and founder of Ecargo Holdings Limited, an ASX listed company. Lau founded Cargo Services Far East Limited in 1990 and serves as its managing director. In 1991, Lau joined the Cargo Services Airfreight Limited, an indirect non-wholly owned subsidiary of CN Logistics International Holdings Limited, and serves as its director. From 14 February 2023, Lau has been redesignated from a non-executive Director to an executive Director at CN Logistics International Holdings Limited.

Lau is the chairman and founder of JL Enterprises and CS Logistics Holdings Limited.

Lau served as Independent non-executive director of Golden Eagle Retail Group Limited (SEHK: 3308) (Chinese: 金鷹商貿集團有限公司) from 1999 to 2011 and Nanjing Sample Technology Company Limited (SEHK: 1708) (Chinese: 南京三宝科技集团有限公司) from 2003 to 2011.

== Education ==
Lau holds a bachelor's degree in Social Sciences from the University of Hong Kong in 1971.

== Business ==
Lau sold a stake in CS Logistics Holdings Limited to HSBC Principal Investments in December 2010, which helped finance the merger of CS Logistics Holdings Limited and Allport Limited (also completed in 2010).

Lau founded United Distribution Services Far East Limited in 1985 and served as its managing director. Lau founded Hoi Kong Container Services Company Limited in 1986 and served as its managing director from 1986 to 1990. In 1989, Jardine Pacific acquired a 41 percent stake in Hoi Kong Container Services Company Limited.

Lau founded Wide Shine Terminals Limited (WST) in 1990 and served as its managing director of WST from 1990 to 1995. Lau founded Mid-Stream Holdings (HK) Limited (MHL) in 1995 and served as managing director of MHL from 1995 to 1997. MHL acquired WST in 1995. MHL was sold to Hutchison Port Holdings in 1997.

Lau joined Dodwell & Co. in 1971 and served as director of Inchcape Export Buying Services in 1983. He left Dodwell & Co. in 1983 to start his own businesses in shipping and international logistics.

== Politics ==
Lau served as the Chief Representative in Hong Kong and China for Bremen Business International from 1993 to 1996, including the ports of Bremen and Bremerhaven.

Lau was appointed as a committee member of the Chinese People's Political Consultative Conference of Nanjing City in the Tenth and Eleventh elections.
