= Ecargo =

- Company type: Public
- Traded as: ASX: ECG
- Industry: B2C supply chain, e-commerce, middleware, mobile commerce, tech consulting, SaaS, software
- Founded: April, 2014
- Headquarters: Hong Kong
- Key people: John Lau Shek Yau (Founder and Executive Chairman); Lawrence Lun (Chief Executive Officer); Yuming Zou (Director)
- Number of employees: 100+ (2021)
- Website: www.ecargo.com

eCargo Holdings Limited (ASX: ECG) is a “One-stop Shop” Online-to-Offline enabler, servicing international brands and retailers entering the Asian market. It maintains operating companies in China, Vietnam and Australia trading under the brand names of eCargo, Jessica's Suitcase, Metcash Asia and Asian Business Group (ABG).

== History ==
=== Post-IPO (2014 - 2015) ===
On November 28, 2014, Ecargo Holdings Limited began trading on the Australian Securities Exchange, raising $30 million in its initial public offering, with an initial share price of $0.40 and initial market capitalization of about $200 million.

According to Christopher Lau, former-chief executive of eCargo, the mission of the company is to help international brands develop and grow their online businesses in China.

On June 9, 2015, ECG hired Franc Renzi, Garnok Cheung and Justus Wilde as Chief Operating Officer, Chief Financial Officer and Chief Strategy Officer, respectively.

=== WWE & Company (2016) ===
On July 26, 2016, ECG announced that it was forming WWE & Company specializing in the development of mobile, cloud-based, O2O commerce enterprise technologies, targeting the mainland Chinese consumers’ growing demand for fashion, beauty and lifestyle. WWE & Company is a joint venture between The Wharf (Holdings) Limited (SEHK: 4), Walton Brown Group (a company of The Lane Crawford Joyce Group), and ECG, initially capitalized at RMB 300 million.

== Operation and products ==
eCargo's services include Distribution and Wholesale, Sourcing and Product Development, Marketing and Brand Activation, Online Store operations, Fulfillment (domestic and cross-border), Consulting and Advisory.

eCargo's fulfillment services comprise a network of operations in Hong Kong, the UK, Australia, the US and Singapore, facilitating a drop-ship model for brands from factory to consumer.

eCargo has developed the eCoreOS e-commerce platform, which enables eCargo to develop and manage multiple custom or marketplace digital commerce online storefronts for retailers and fashion brands.

== Brands ==
As of 2014, eCargo Enterprise Limited international brand portfolio included fashion, fast moving consumer goods (FMCG), beauty and cosmetics products. It also performed operating services on behalf of retailers and agents.
