= Nanjing Sample Technology =

Chinese technology company

Nanjing Sample Technology Company Limited (simplified Chinese: 南京三宝科技股份有限公司; traditional Chinese: 南京三寶科技股份有限公司) is a high-technology enterprise which is located in Nanjing and is listed on the Main Board of the Hong Kong Stock Exchange.

Sample Technology is the People's Republic of China's largest developer and provider in the field of intelligence traffic targeting on government authorities. Its products and systems are currently designated for use in traffic monitoring and control sector and custom logistics monitoring sector in the PRC.

The video technologies adopted by the group include video data capturing, transmission and processing technologies which involve the utilization of system software to enable, among others, digital video recording, photo taking, video data compression and decompression, various types of image processing and identification and data analyses.

In the recent years, the company has engaged in the investigation of microwave radio frequency technology, launched new technologies and new products in the intelligent traffic sector and customs logistics sector, and continued to find out the upgrading potentials of information services.

Sample Technology was listed on the Growth Enterprise Market of the Hong Kong Stock Exchange on 9 June 2004 as HKEx:8287. Sample Technology subsequently transferred its listing to the Main Board of the Stock Exchange of Hong Kong in November 2010.

== See also ==
- Intelligent transportation system
