= Cotton College =

Roman Catholic boarding school in England

Coordinates: 53°0′55″N 1°54′13″W

Information
- Other name: Saint Wilfrid's College
- Religious affiliation(s): Roman Catholic
- Established: 1763
- Closed: 1987

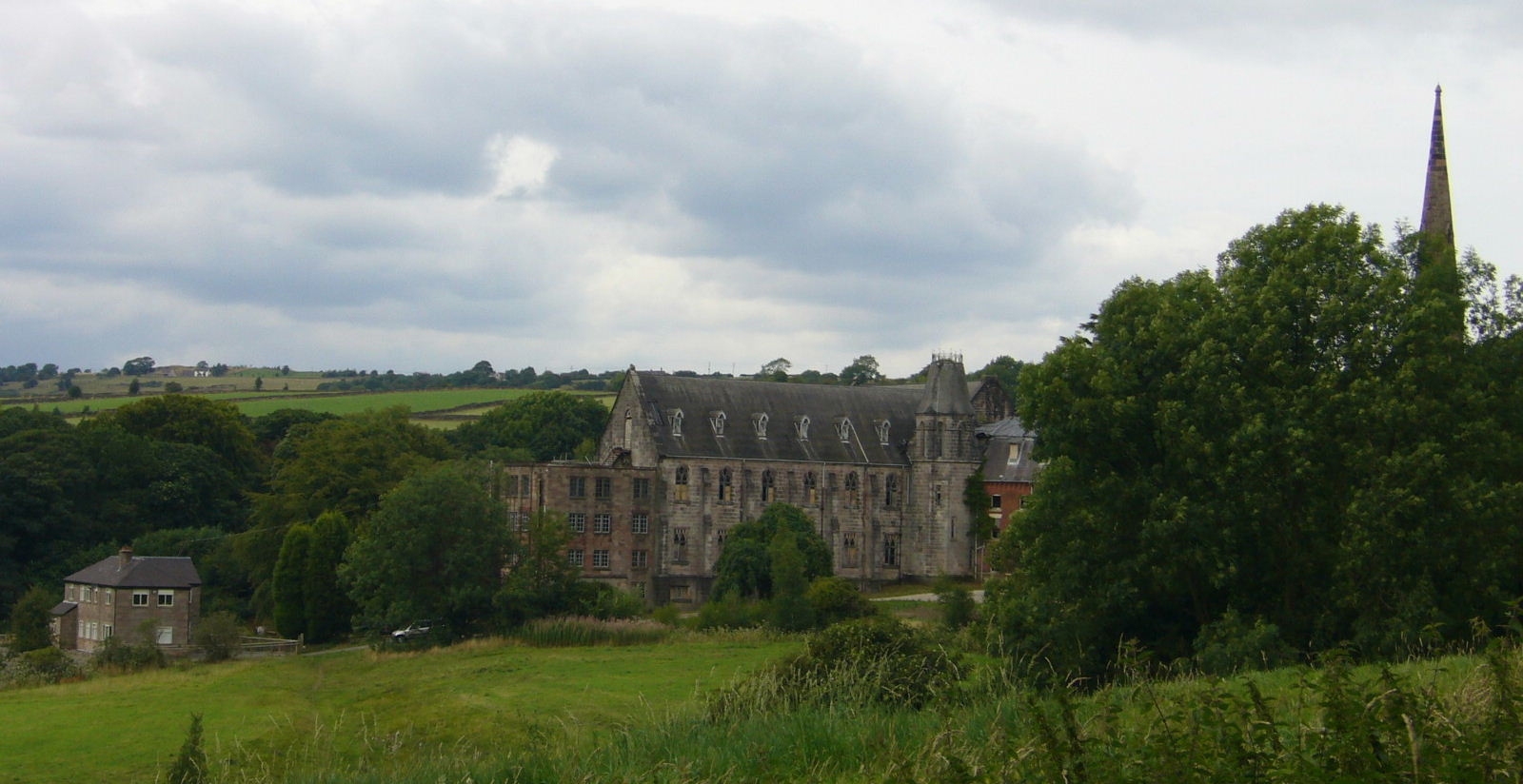

Cotton College was a Roman Catholic boarding school in Cotton, Staffordshire, United Kingdom. It was also known as Saint Wilfrid's College.

The school buildings were centred on Cotton Hall, a country house used by religious communities from the 1840s until the school moved there in 1873. The school closed in 1987 and the site is now derelict. The school and its chapel (St Wilfrid's church) are both Grade II listed buildings.

== History of the school ==
The school was founded in 1763 at Sedgley Park School, Wolverhampton – now a hotel. It was founded by William Errington at the recommendation of Bishop Richard Challoner. In 1873 it moved to Cotton Hall. The school closed in 1987 due to financial difficulties.

== Architecture ==
=== Cotton Hall ===
==== Original building ====
Cotton Hall appears to date back to 1630 and was most probably built by the Morrice family. Thomas Gilbert rebuilt the house in the eighteenth century. In 1843 Cotton Hall was sold to the Earl of Shrewsbury. The Earl was a prominent Roman Catholic, who lived at Alton Towers nearby. He offered the building to a religious community under the leadership of Frederick William Faber.

=== Extensions ===
The house was extended in 1846–1848 for use by the religious community, which started a village school and sought to convert locals to Roman Catholicism. The building work was financed by the Earl, who gave the commission to his architect Augustus Pugin, most famous for his work with Charles Barry on the Houses of Parliament.

After the boarding school moved to Cotton, the building was further extended in 1874-1875, 1886-1887 and 1931-1932.

=== St Wilfrid's Church ===
As well as extending the house, Pugin designed a chapel in Gothic Revival style linked to the main building by a single-storey passage building. It has a south-west tower with a broach spire.

St Wilfrid's Church remained intact after the closure of the school, although regular services are no longer held there.

== Notable alumni ==
- David Cashman (Bishop of Arundel and Brighton)
- Kieran Conry (Bishop of Arundel and Brighton)
- John Cornwell (writer)
- Billy Kan (Hong Kong billionaire)
- Camille Solon (artist)
- Thomas Leighton Williams (Archbishop of Birmingham)

== See also ==
- Listed buildings in Cotton, Staffordshire
