= Layout of the Port of Tianjin =

The Port of Tianjin is divided into nine areas: the three core ("Tianjin Xingang") areas of Beijiang, Nanjiang, and Dongjiang around the Xingang fairway; the Haihe area along the river; the Beitang port area around the Beitangkou estuary; the Dagukou port area in the estuary of the Haihe River; and three areas under construction (Hanggu, Gaoshaling, Nangang).

Map of the Port of Tianjin and its Approaches

== Beijiang Port Area ==
Map of the Beijiang Port Area

Beijiang Port Area (Chinese: 北疆港区; pinyin: běijiāng gǎngqū; lit. 'Northern Border Port Area') includes the original areas of the Tanggu New Port, plus new facilities built on reclaimed land north of the Main Basin. It covers approximately 36.8 km^{2}, has 18.9 km of coastline, and contains mostly container and general cargo terminals. It is also the main service and administration area of the port, including the Tianjin Port Container Logistics Center, the Tianjin Port Trade and Shipping Service Area, and the 7 km^{2} Tianjin Port Free Trade Zone

Beijiang Port Area Terminals and Wharves
Terminal	Structure	Type	Berths	Berth Number	Quay length	Depth	Quay Cranes	Area	Annual Capacity	Owner	Notes
Tianjin Passenger Terminal (天津港客运站)	?	Passenger	3 (10,000 DWT)	K1-3	439 m	8–12 m	1 (10 t)	1.03 ha	350,000 pass.	TPC	
First Stevedoring Company Terminal (天津港第一港埠有限公司杂货码头)	Concrete High Pile Platform (混凝土高桩承台)	Multi-Purpose	6 (3×10,000; 1×15,000; 2×30,000 DWT; )	G1-3; G5-G6bis	1,401 m	11–10.5 m	6×40 t; 2×35 t; 3×25 t; 1×10 t	?	1 Mt; 560,000 TEU	TPC	
Tianjin Xingang Sinor Terminal (天津新港赛挪码头)	?	General & Specialist	1 (38,000 DWT)	G4	200 m	10.7 m	1×10 t	?	0.6 Mt	TPC, GB Terminals	Square-shaped cargo.
First Basin Barge Wharf (一港池西侧驳船码头)	?	Barge	n/a	?	74 m	4.8 m	n/a	n/a	n/a	Remains of former First Stevedoring Barge Wharf.	
Second Stevedoring Company Terminal (天津港埠二公司杂货码头)	Concrete High Pile Platform	Multi-purpose	9 (4×70,000; 3×15,000; 2×25,000 DWT)	G7-G15	1,951 m	15–8.5 m	3×40 t; 1×61 t; 14×25 t; 11×10 t	43 ha	20 Mt; 250,000 TEU	TPD	2 Container berths; Bulk grain terminal
First Pier Head Wharf (天津港第二港埠有限公司一突堤堤头码头)	?	General	1×10,000 DWT	Yitudi	217.25 m	9 m	n/a	?	n/a	Tug wharf	
Fourth Stevedoring Company Terminal (天津港埠四公司码头)	Concrete High-Pile Platform	Bulk & General	5 (3×30,000 DWT; 2×50,000 DWT)	G16-20	912 m	9–13.5 m	5×25 t; 11×10 t	46 ha	capacity	TPC	Timber, Mineral Ore
Second Pier Head Wharf (二突堤端部横码头)	?	General	1	Ertudi	140 m	5.5 m	0	n/a	?		
Chimbusco Beijiang Bunkerage Base (天津中燃船舶燃料公司北疆燃油供应基地)		Oil	2×10,000 DWT; 5×5,000 DWT	Gongyou	186 / 612 m	11 m	?	n/a	1.2 Mt	In a basin at the southern tip of Pier No. 2.	
Fifth Stevedoring Company Terminal (天津港埠五公司码头)	Concrete High Pile Platform	Bulk & General	5 (3×70,000; 2×150,000 DWT)	G22-G26	996 m	15–16.5 m	19 (76×40 t; 12×10 t)	35 ha	2.3 Mt	TPC	
Third Pier Head Wharf (三突堤端部横码头)	?	General	2	Santudi	246 m	8.2 m	5	n/a	?		
Tianjin Port Container Terminal (天津港集装箱码头)	Concrete High Pile Platform	Container	4 (1×25,000DWT; 3×50,000 DWT)	G21; G27-G29	398+825 m	12–16 m	14 (3×30.5 t; 1×40.5 t; 10×61 t)	70 ha	1.6 M TEU	TPD	comments
Tianjin Orient Container Terminal (天津东方海陆集装箱码头)	High Pile Beam & Slab (高桩梁板承台)	Container	4 (100,000 DWT)	G30-G33	1,138 m	14 m	10 (2×30.5 t; 3×40.5 t; 5×43 t	45 ha	1.4M TEU	TPC, DP World, NWA	
Tianjin Dongtudi East Service Craft Wharf (天津港东突堤东侧工作船码头)	High Pile Trestle Double-sided Pier (高桩栈桥式两侧靠船)	Service	n/a	?	368+148 m	5.5 m	0	n/a	n/a	T-shaped bridge pier for Tug & Lighter Co.	
Tianjin Five Continents International Container Terminal (天津五洲国际集装箱码头)	Caisson Gravity Wall (沉箱重力)	Container	4 (100,000 DWT)	G35-G38	1,202 m	13.8–15.7 m	12 (65 t)	35 ha	1.5 M TEU	TPC, CMHI, China Shipping, NWS, CP	comments
Tianjin Port RO-RO Terminal (天津港滚装码头)	?	Ro-Ro	2 (50,000 – 80,000 DWT)	N1-2	471 m	14.1 m	0	13,8 ha	200,000 CEU; 1.5 Mt edible oil	TPC, NYKK, WWL	Also grain and edible oil.
Tianjin Port Alliance International Container Terminal (天津港联盟国际集装箱码头)	?	Container	4 (100,000 DWT)	N3-6	1,100 m	15.5 m	11 (65 t)	63.2 ha	1.85 M TEU	TPD, PSA International, OOCL, APMT	
Tianjin Port Euroasia International Container Terminal (天津港欧亚国际集装箱码头)	?	Container	3 (2×100,000; 1×70,000 DWT)	N7-9	1,100 m	16 m	10 (65 t)	83,6 ha	1,8 M TEU	TPD, COSCO Pacific, APMT	
Tianjin Port Shenghua International Container Terminal (天津港盛华国际集装箱码头)	?	Container	3 (100,000 DWT)	N10-12	1,100 m	15.5–18 m	n/a	n/a	1.7 M TEU	TPC, Tianjin Terminal Link, CASC	Under Construction
Beigangchi Gangwei Storage Wharf (北港池港威仓储码头)	?	Sand	?	n/a	115m	?	n/a	n/a	?	Gangwei Storage Co.	Temporary
TPG Global RO-RO Terminal (天津港环球滚装码头)	?	Ro-Ro	2 (75,000 DWT)	N13-14	580 m	11.4 m	0	34 ha	500,000 CEU	TPC, NYKK, WWL	Tilted wharf (75%) to account for tides.
Beigangchi Longboda Wharf (北港池隆博达码头)	?	Sand	?	n/a	150m	?	n/a	n/a	?	Tianjin Longboda Materials	Temporary

== Nanjiang Port Area ==
Map of the Nanjiang Port Area

The Nanjiang Area (Chinese: 南疆港区; pinyin: nánjiāng gǎngqū; lit. 'Southern Border Port Area') lies on an artificial island 16 km long (east to west) by 1.3–2 km wide (north to south), with an area of approximately 26 km^{2}. Shoreline is 14.2 km long on the north side(opening to the Main Channel), and 12 km on the south side (opening to the Dagusha Channel). This port area contains the bulk cargo terminals, in particular the large oil, ore and coal terminals.

Nanjiang Port Area Terminals and Wharves
Terminal	Structure	Type	Berths	Berth Number	Quay length	Depth	Quay Cranes	Area	Annual Capacity	Owner	Notes
Tourist Boats Wharf (旅游船码头)	Wooden Pontoon	Service	n/a	?	190 m	2 m	n/a	?	?	?	Former Yuanyang service wharf.
Beihai Search and Rescue's Tianjin Base Wharf (北海救助局天津基地码头)		Patrol	2	?	115+65 m	6–5.5 m	?	0.7 ha	n/a	CSR	One of three dynamic rescue stations
Bohai Oil's Materials Supply Company Comprehensive Service Terminal (渤海石油物资供应公司综合作业码头)		Service/Oil	?	Bohaiyou 4–6	180+422+875 m	5–6 m	6	n/a	?	CNOOC Bohai Oil Co.	OSV base.
AtoN Base (天津海事局航标区基地)	板桩拉锚结构	Patrol	n/a	Haibiao	245 m	6–4 m	n/a	?	?	Tianjin MSA	Angular Pier
Tianjin Beifang Ganghang Petroleum Terminal (天津北方港航石化码头)		Oil	2×50,000 DWT	Beifangyou 1–2	300 m	?	6 loading arms	13.98 ha	1.9 Mt	TJNP	
First Harbor Engineering First Wharf ( 一航局1号码头)	栈桥式高桩梁板	Service		Yihang Yihao	200 m	7 m	2×3,000 DWT; 1 barge slip	12 ha	?	FHE	
First Harbor Engineering Pre-stressed Concrete Structures Factory Wharf ( 中港一航局一公司南疆新建预应力预制构件厂出运码头)	高桩梁板	Service	4×3,000 DWT	Yihang Erhao	250+180 m	6 m	4×3,000 DWT	71.1 ha		FHE	
MSA Shipping Management Wharf (海事局航政码头)		Patrol	n/a	Hangzheng	275 m	4 m	n/a	?	n/a	Tianjin MSA	
Nanjiang Harbor Terminal (南疆海港码头)	高桩梁板式	Bulk	1 (20.000 DWT container or 35,000 DWT bulk)	Haigang	209 m	8 m	4	5,66 ha	4.5 Mt	Third Stevedoring Co.	
Tianjin Port Petrochemical Terminal (天津港石油化工码头)	高桩承台墩	Oil	4+1 (1×300,000; 1×80,000; 2×30,000 DWT; 15,000 DWT)	S1-4 (S1W)	1,227.5 m	17.4 – 18.8 m	24 (loading arms)	?	20 Mt	TPC	S1W is a service wharf.
Tianjin Port Coke Terminal(天津港焦炭码头)	混凝土高桩承台	Bulk Ore	2 (70,000 DWT)	S5-6	684 m	13.8 m	7 (4×30 t; 3×40 t) / 2 loaders (2000 t/hr)	10 ha	1.8 Mt	TPC	
Tianjin Port Huaneng Coal Terminal(天津港中煤华能煤码头)	混凝土高桩承台	Coal	4 (150,000 – 200,000 DWT)	S7-10	1,110 m	19.6 m	4 loaders (2,200 mm); 2 cranes (40 t)	30 ha	4 Mt	TPC, CNCGC, CHG	
Tianjin Port Yuanhang Ore Terminal(天津港远航矿石码头)	混凝土高桩承台	Ore	1×200,000 DWT)	S11	445 m	20.8 m	10 (40 t)	?	?	TPC, OL	
Tianjin Port Yuanhang Bulk Cargo Terminal (天津港远航散货码头)	混凝土高桩承台	Ore	1×100,000 DWT)	S12	375 m	?	6 (40 t)	?	?	TPC, OL	
Shenhua Tianjin Coal Terminal Phase 1 (神华天津港煤炭码头一期)	混凝土高桩承台	Bulk	3 (1×150,000; 2×70,000 DWT)	S13-15	890 m	19.2 m	3 loaders	?	45 Mt	TPC, CSE	
Shenhua Coal Terminal Phase II (神华天津港煤炭码头二期)		Bulk	3 (150,000; 70,000; 50,000 DWT)	S16-18	890 m	19.2 m	3 loaders	?	35 Mt	TPC, CSE	Under construction
Tianjin Port Dry Bulk Terminal (干散泊位)		Bulk	5	S19-23	1,500 m	22.5 m	?	?	?	?	Under construction.
Tianjin Port Dry Bulk Terminal (干散泊位)		Bulk	2	S24-25	830 m	22.5 m	?	?	?	?	Under construction.
Nanjiang Specialized Ore Terminal (南疆专业化矿石码头)		Bulk	1×300,000 DWT; (1×300,000 DWT projected)	S26-S27	400 m	24.8 m	?	23 Mt	?	?	Projected to accept 400,000 DWT (very large ore carriers)．Under construction
Tianjin Port CNOOC Crude Oil Terminal (天津港实华原油码头)		Oil	1 (300,000 DWT)	S28	?	?	?	?	?	CNOOC	Under construction
Tianjin Port PetroChina Crude Oil Terminal ()		Oil	1 (300,000 DWT)	S29	484 m	22 m	arms (360 mm)	?	20 Mt	TPC, Petrochina	Under Construction
Tianjin Port Shihua Crude Oil Terminal (天津港实华原油码头)		Oil	1 (300,000 DWT)	S30	484 m	22.5 m	4 loading arms (360 mm)	?	20 Mt	TPD, Sinopec	Unloading rate 8,000–12,000 t/hr
Tianjin Port Sinopec LNG Terminal (天津港实华原油码头扩建)		LNG	1 (300,000 DWT); 1 service berth	S31	?	22.5 m	440 m	?	18 Mt	TPC, Sinopec	Under construction.
Second Chimbusco Bunkering Base Wharf (天津港燃油供应2#基地码头)		Bunker	2×5,000 DWT	S32-33	260 m	6.5 m	?	14.3 ha	3.8 Mt	Under Construction	
Sinochem Tianjin Port Petrochemical Terminal (中化天津港石化码头)		Oil	3 (1×50,000; 1×10,000; 1×5,000 DWT)	S34-36	509 m	?	?	42 ha	5 Mt	SinoChem, TPC	950,000 m^{3} tanks
Tianjin Port Nanjiang China Aviation Oil Petroleum Terminal (天津港南疆中国航油石化码头)工程		Oil	2×50,000 DWT	S37-38	560 m	14.5 m	?	?	6 Mt	CNAF TPC	
Tianjin Port Shenghan Petrochemical Terminal (天津港圣瀚石化码头)	?	Oil	3 (1×50,000 DWT; 2×10,000 DWT)	S36-37	680 m	?	?	50 ha	7 Mt	TPG; TJHF	31 ha, 120,000 m^{3} tank farm
CNOOC Tianjin Port LNG Receiving Terminal (中海油天津浮式LNG接收终端项)		LNG	1 FSRU; 1×200,000 DWT projected	S52(?)	450 m	15 m	?	?	2.2 Mt (6 Mt projected)	TPC, CNOOC, Tianjin Gas	Under construction.

== Dongjiang Port Area ==
Map of the Dongjiang Port Area

Dongjiang Port Area (Chinese: 东疆港区; pinyin: dōngjiāng gǎngqū; lit. 'East Border Port Area') lies on an artificial peninsula 10 km long and 3 km wide to the northeast of the main basin, and has an approximate area of 33 km^{2}. This is the newest part of Tianjin Xingang, and is still in development. It includes a new container terminal, a regional logistics center, and a 10 km^{2} bonded port area (the Dongjiang Bonded Port).

The Dongjiang Port Area is being developed into a comprehensive complex with three parallel zones: the terminal area; a logistic processing zone associated with the bonded port; and a comprehensive service zone, which will include office space, residential space, and shopping and leisure facilities. The leisure area will be centered on the cruiser terminal and yachting piers, and around an artificial beach (the Dongjiang Bay Scenic Area), built with sand imported from Fujian and including a variety of entertainment facilities (including a dragon boat pier).

Dongjiang Port Area Terminals and Wharves
Terminal	Port Area	Structure	Berths	Berth Numbers	Quay length	Depth	Quay Cranes	Area	Annual Capacity	Owners	Notes
Tianjin Port Huicheng General Cargo Terminal (天津港汇盛杂货码头)		General	4 (2×40,000 DWT; 2×100,000 DWT)	N33-36	1075 m	14–15.5 m	13 (10×25, 2×40, 1×60 t)	40 ha	11 Mt	TPC, KIH	
Tianjin Port Pacific International Container Terminal (天津港太平洋国际集装箱码头)		Container	6×150,000 DWT)	D1-6	2,300 m	16 m	23 (65 t)	218 ha	4M TEU	PSA International; TPC	
Dongjiang Construction Materials Terminal (东疆建材码头)		Bulk	1×10,000 DWT	Dongjiang Kuangjian	212 m	10 m	5	2 ha	1.3 Mt	TPC	Sea sand and stone
Dongjiang MSA Comprehensive Supervision Base (东疆海事综合监管基地)		Patrol	1×3,000 gt	?	200 m	?	n/a	2 ha	n/a	Tianjin MSA	UAV ramp. Under construction
Binhai Ocean One International Yachting Club (滨海一洋国际游艇会心)		Passenger	700+200	?	?	?	n/a	5 ha	?		Under Construction
Tianjin International Cruiser Homeport (天津国际邮轮母港)	高桩梁板	Passenger	2×200,000 DWT (6 planned)	Y1-2	625 m (2,000 m planned)	11.5 m	n/a	8 ha	500,000 passengers	TPC; CMHK	
Tianjin Port Dongjiang Development Memorial Park Hydraulic Engineering Wharf (天津港东疆建设开发纪念公园水工码头)	?	Service	?	?	78 m	?	n/a	40.9 ha	n/a	TPG	

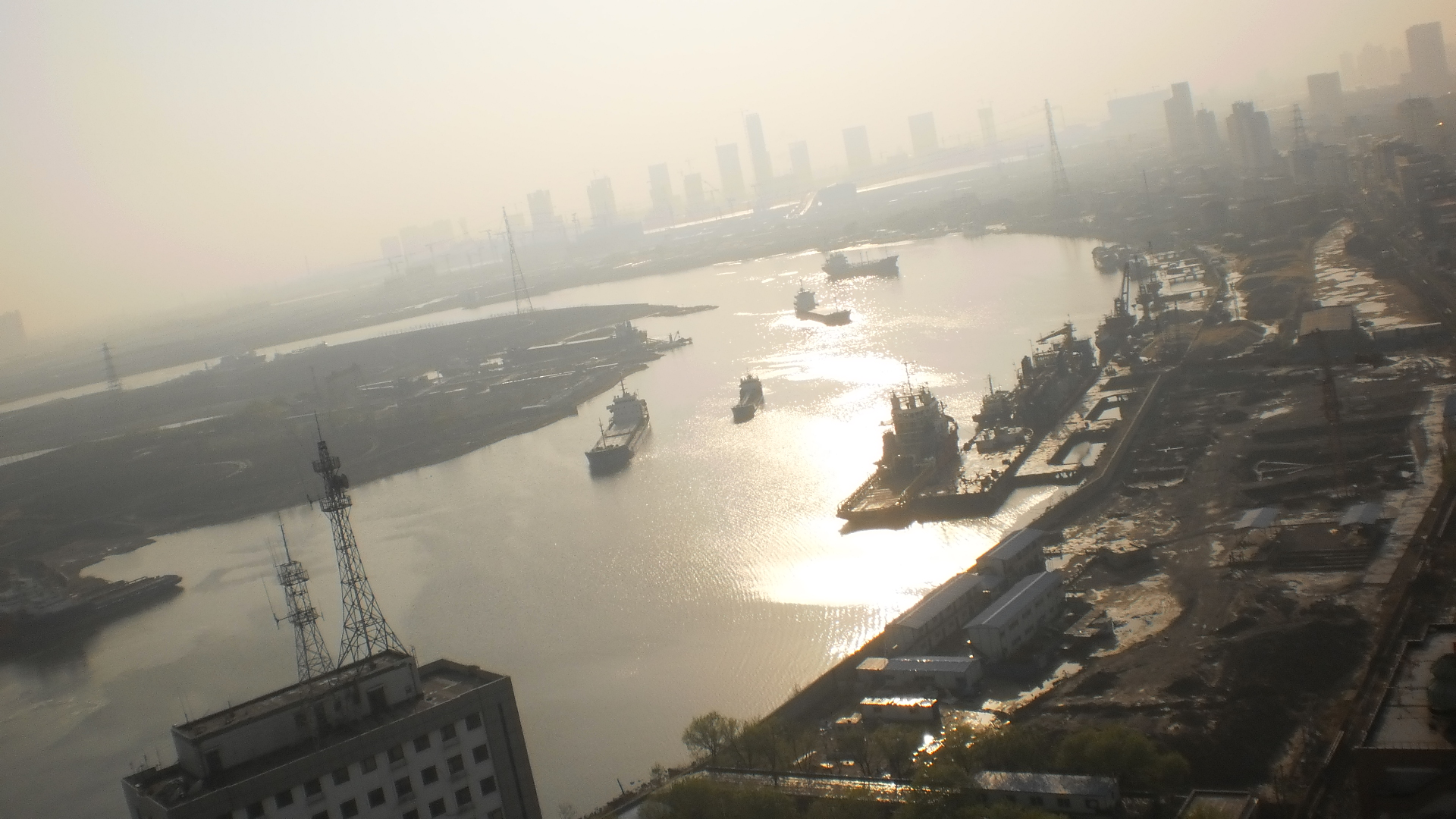
First bend of the Haihe in the afternoon

== Haihe Port Area ==
The Haihe Port Area (Chinese: 海河港区; pinyin: hǎihé gǎngqū) operates all river docks from the Xingang Shipping Lock up to the Haihe Second Tidal Barrier, a distance of 39.5 km. Once the core of the Tanggu port, the lower Haihe river area has seen diminishing number of wharves as riverfront real estate has been reassigned for development. In 2003, the Haihe Port Area had 7,100 m of quayside, 83 berths, 56 production berths dealing with all sorts of cargo including containers. The start of the work on the new Tanggu CBD, however, meant the demolition of most facilities in the Xiangguowan, Yujiapu and Lanjingdao peninsulas, including the large Third Stevedoring Company terminal in Yujiapu, which closed in 2009.

Haihe Port Area map

This wind-down of activity is still continuing, and on January 1, 2012, the Haihe will be downgraded from a category I waterway into a category IV, limited to vessels under 1,000 DWT and 10 m of air draft (which will permit the extensive bridge construction planned for the lower Haihe). This change will effectively close the river to seagoing vessels, and limit Haihe traffic to barges. Nevertheless, industrial expansion further up the river will lead to a recovery in the number of available berths. Current plans call for six different production areas, with an area of 9.7 km^{2} and a quayside length of 21 km.

Haihe Port Area Terminals and Wharves
Terminal	Structure	Type	Berths	Berth Number	Quay length	Depth	Quay Cranes	Area	Annual Capacity	Owner	Notes
Xingang Shiplock Navigation Wharves (新港船闸导航码头)		Service	n/a	?	261.8 m (84.3+177.5 m)	2.9–4.7 m	0	0	n/a	Two service wharves at both sides of shiplock	
First Harbor Engineering First Company Boat Section		Service	?	?	137 m		?	?	?	FHE	2 additional barge slips
Tianjin Port Well Yield Logistics Terminal (天津中港伟业物流码头)		Multi-Purpose	4 (3,000 DWT)	sihao matou	120+360 m	5.5 m	8 inch loading arm	30 ha	?		
MSA AtoN Tanggu Wharf (天津海事局海标处塘沽码头)	?	Patrol	?	?	117 m	4 m	n/a	?	n/a	TJMSA	Notes
Tug & Lighter Company Haihe Wharf (驳船公司海河码头	单锚钢筋混凝土板桩	Service	?	?	151.6 m	4 m	n/a	?	n/a	TJTLC	
Yongtai Wharf (永泰码头),	预应力钢筋混凝土高桩大板栈桥结构	Service	?	Yongtai	131 m	4 m	n/a	?	n/a	Being decommissioned	
Sinotrans Yujiapu Terminal (外运于家堡码头)	高桩无梁	General	1×5,000 DWT	Waiyun	102 m+50m	4.5 m	0	?	n/a	Being decommissioned	
Jinghai Petrochemical 908 Wharf (京海石化油脂908码头)		Bulk Liquid	2 (5,000; 3,000 DWT)	T1-2	137+55 m	6–5.5 m	10 loading arms (160 t/hr)	?	?		
Hebei Maritime Transport Terminal (河北海运码头)		Bulk Liquid	2	Shuixian	145 m	6 m	3,000 m	?	?		
Target Towing Detachment Tangu Wharf (拖靶队塘沽码头)	高桩无梁大板栈桥	Patrol	?	?	73 m	4 m	n/a	?	n/a	PLAN	Notes
Border Troops Tanggu Wharf (边防塘沽码头)	高桩梁板	Patrol	?		136m	4m	n/a	?	n/a	Binhai Border Guards	Used by CG, FLEC and CII.
Dagu Chemical Co. Liquid Chemical Terminal (大化丙烯液碱码头)	高桩承台	Liquid Bulk	3 (1×5,000; 1×3,000; 1×1,000 DWT)	Dahua 1–2	130+101+48 m	5.6 m	?	?	?		Propylene, Liquid Lye and Calcium Carbide terminals
Tianlong Liquid Chemical Co. Terminal (天津天龙液体化工储运码头)		Liquid Bulk	1×3,000 DWT	Tianlong	120 m	5 m	?	?	?	DCG	
Tianjin Binhai Alliance Petrochemical Terminal (天津滨海联合石化物流码头)		Liquid Bulk	2×3,000 DWT	Binhai Shihua East/West	142.1 m	3.9 m	4 (?)	30 ha	?		
North Sea Oil and Grain Company Terminal (北海粮油储炼厂码头)	钢筋混凝土高土桩承台	Liquid Bulk	2 (3,000 DWT)	Beihai Liangyou	185+100 m	6 m	?	?	?	COFCO	
Tianjin Huagang Logistics Co. Terminal (天津华港物流杂货码头)	高桩墩台式结构	General	3 (2×5,000; 1×3,500 DWT)	Huagang 1–3	384 m	5 m	5	?	?		Serving the Beihai ceramics market
Sinotrans Tianjin Xinhe Distribution Terminal (中国外运天津集团新河储运码头)	高桩梁板结构	General	5 (3,000 DWT)	Xinhewaiyun 1–5	488 m	6 m	9 (15 t)	10 ha	?	?	外运新河
Tianjin Tiande Logistics Company Terminal (天津天德物流码头)		General	2 (3000 DWT)	Tiande 1–2	126.5 m+129m	6.2 m	6 (2×40 t; 4×16 t)	6 ha		5.5 Mt	
Xinhe Oil Storage and Distribution Center Terminal (新河储油所码头)		Oil	1 (3,000 DWT)	Xinhechuyou	123 m	6 m	?	?	?		
Great Wall Lubricants Terminal (长城滑油码头)	钢筋混凝土高桩无梁大板Open high pile	Oil	1 (5,000 DWT)	Changcheng	120 m	5.6 m	?	?		Sinolube	新河储油所
Second Barrier Water Conservancy Wharf (二道闸水利码头)	?	Dredging	?	?	88 m	4.5 m	0	?	n/a		
Tianjin Shangyuan Terminal (天津上源码头港业公司码头)		Bulk	1 (3,000 DWT)	Shangyuan	97 m	4.8 m	2	?	?	Servicing the Chaori Power Plant.	
Goods and Materials Cooperation Terminal (物资协作码头)		Bulk	1	Wuzixiezuo	120 m	5 m	2	?	?		
Zhengjiatai Terminal (郑家台码头)	钢筋混凝土板桩	Bulk	4 (2×2,000, 1×3,000,1×3,500 DWT )	Zhengjiatai 1–4	404 m	5 m	5	12.1 ha	3.6 Mt	TPC	Construction materials

== Beitang Port Area ==
The Beitang Port Area (Chinese: 北塘港区; pinyin: běitáng gǎngqū) lies on both sides of the Beitangkou estuary. At present it is limited to several small barge wharves, but it is planned to expand as part of the development of the Binhai Tourism Area. There are two service wharves planned, 230 m and 150 m in length, plus a large environmental monitoring base, passenger terminal, construction materials wharves and yachting marina. The Beitang Fishing Harbor is directly north, inside the river estuary.

== Dagukou Port Area ==
Map of the Dagukou Port Area

The Dagukou Port Area (Chinese: 大沽口港区; pinyin: dàgūkǒu gǎngqū) lies on the southern side of the Haihe river mouth. It is composed of the wharves of the Tianjin Lingang Harbor Economic Zone (Chinese: 天津临港经济区; pinyin: tiānjīn língǎng jīngjìqū), which is a large industrial area being constructed on reclaimed land. The Dagukou port area is expanding fast, and it is expected to reach a capacity of 100 Mt per year by 2015. Further up the Haihe estuary is the Donggu Fishing Port, which still moors 400 (mostly small) fishing boats.

Dagukou Port Area Terminals and Wharves
Terminal	Structure	Type	Berths	Berth Numbers	Quay length	Depth	Quay Cranes	Area	Annual Capacity	Owner	Notes
Haihe Estuary Flood Prevention Dredging Wharf (海河口防汛疏浚码头 )	?	Dredging	?	?	280 m	?	n/a	?	n/a	Haihe Water Conservancy	Being converted for MSA service.
Donggu Fishing Harbor Wharf (东沽渔港)	?	Fishing	200 (4 wharves)	?	400 m	2 m	?	?	?		
Tianjin Binhai Enesis Trade Base (天津滨海格赛斯贸易基地)	?	General	1×2,000 DWT	?	500 m	7.8 m	Quay Cranes	2.3 ha	?	Enesis	Cold Chain & Livestock. Under Construction
Lingang General Berth 1A (天津港临 1A 通用泊位)	Marginal High Pile Beam & Slab (顺岸高桩梁板结构)	General	1×50,000 DWT	L1A	200 m	11 m	Quay Cranes	?	?	LHAC	Specialized Cement
Tianjin Lingang 1B-C Berths (天津港临 1B～C 泊位)	?	General	2×20,000 DWT	L1B-C	370 m	11 m	3	?	?	LHAC	
Tianjin Lingang General Berths No. 2 & No. 3 (天津港临2～3通用泊位)	?	General	2×50,000 DWT		479 m	7.8 m		?	?	LHAC	
Tianjin Lingang General Berth 4 (天津港临4通用泊位)	?	General	1×20,000 DWT	L4	220 m	11 m	3	?	1.24 Mt	LHAC	
Stolthaven Tianjin Chemical Terminal (天津思多而特临港仓储?)	?	Oil	2 (1×20,000; 1×60,000 DWT)	L5-6	330+365 m	10.5–14 m	?	13 ha	?	SNTG, LHAC	
Lingang Vopak Terminal (临港孚宝码头)	Offshore Marginal Narrow Platform High Pile Beam & Slab (离岸式窄承台高桩梁板码头结构)	Liquid Chemical & Oil	2×50,000 DWT	Berth L7-8	604 m	14 m	?	62 ha	3.75 Mt	KVNV, BCIG, TJNP	Activated in January 2012
Tianjin Lingang Jinneng Petrochemical Terminal (天津临港津能石化码头有限公司)	?	Liquid Chemical & Oil	1×50,000 DWT)	L9	298 m	?	?	?	Annual Capacity	Jinneng	Under Construction
Tianjin Dagukou General Berths 10–11 (天津港大沽口港区10-11#通用泊位码头)	?	General	2×70,000 DWT	L10-11	521 m	15 m	?	?	4.2 Mt	LHAC	
Tianjin Lingang General Berth 18 (天津港临港工业港区18号通用泊位)	?	General	1×20,000 DWT	L18	260.5 m	?	?	20 ha	900,000 t	LHAC	Under Construction
Dagukou Bomesc Oceanic Heavy Industry Construction Base Wharf (大沽口港区博迈科海洋重工建造基地码头)	?	Components Transfer and Fitting	2 (1×6,000 DWT; 1×3,000 DWT)	?	250 m	?	?	?	?	CCCC	
Tianjin Lingang Shipbuilding Base Fitting Wharf #1 and Materials Wharf (中船重工天津临港造修船基地造船区1#舾装及材料码头)	?	Fitting, Materials	2 (1×300,000 DWT,1×5,000 DWT)	?	707+150 m	9 m	?	?	?	CSIC	
Cofco Jiayue Grains & Oil Terminal (天津临港佳悦油码头)	?	Dry & Liquid Bulk	3 (1×70,000; 2×100,000 DWT)	Liangyou 1–3	310 m (berth 1)	16 m	?	30 ha	6 Mt	COFCO; BGG;SMG	Berths 2–3 Under Construction
Sinovel Windpower Tianjin Lingang Shipping Base (华锐风电天津临港装运基地)	High Pile	Equipment	4×5,000 DWT	?	520 m	?	?	24.8 ha	?	Sinovel	Under Construction

== Port fairway ==
The Tianjin Xingang Fairway is divided into the Main Shipping Channel, the Chuanzhadong Channel, and the Northern Branch Channel. The Dagusha Channel and the Haihe river channel are separate fairways with slightly different regulations.

=== Shipping channels ===
1. The Main shipping channel (新港主航道) is 39.5 km long. The channel extends from the gate line of the VTS control area (20 nautical miles (37 km) from the VTS control tower), up to the start of the Chuanzhadong Channel. (Note: Since 2008, the Main Channel incorporates the old "Dengtabei Channel" that still appears in older charts as extending from the Dagu Lighthouse to safe water) Since November 2010, the Main Channel has been dredged to a depth of −19.5 m and a bottom width of 420 m, making it capable of handling two-way 250,000 DWT traffic, and to accept 300,000 DWT ships at high tide. There are two service channels (100 m wide and 9 m deep) at each side of the main channel, which allow ships under 10,000 DWT (i.e. service craft, barges and coastal ships) to transit without interference from the big ships. The breakwater mouth was expanded to 1,100 m wide in 2010. As of 2012, the Main Channel is being deepened to 22 m and widened to 765 m, which will allow two-way all-tide traffic of 300,000 DWT ships by 2013.
2. The Chuanzhadong channel (船闸东航道), called "Chuanzha channel" in Admiralty charts, starts roughly at the level of the Second Pier and ends at the Xingang Shipping Lock, a total of around 4.5 km. Its depth varies between 10 m to 5 m as it approaches the shiplock.
3. The Northern Harbor Branch Channel (北港支航道) extends from its bifurcation from the main channel up to the northern end of the basin, approximately 6.5 km. It has been dredged all the way to the end of the basin (where the Huicheng terminal lies) to a depth of 15 m and a width of between 190 m to 390 m. Its junction with the Main Channel was widened to 765 m in 2007 to facilitate traffic merging.

The Dagusha Channel (大沽沙航道) is wholly separate from the Main Channel. It is 27.5 km long from safe water (12 m isobath) to the mouth of the Haihe. It was upgraded in December 2010 to a depth of 12.3 m, 180 m wide, for a one-way traffic capacity of 50,000 DWT (100,000 DWT in high tide). Current dredging is expanding the Channel to 230 m bottom width and 14 m depth, which will allow all-tide traffic of 100,000 DWT vessels. The long-term plan is to dredge the Channel up to a two-way 200,000 DWT capability.

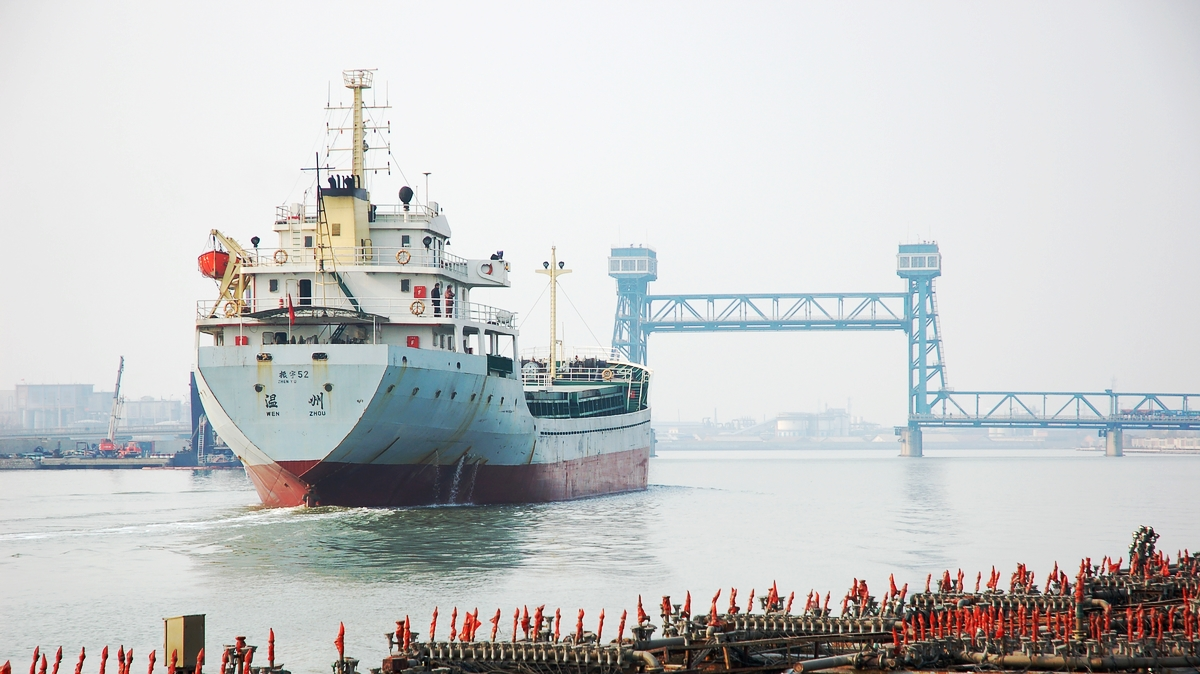
Ship going upstream on the Haihe. Ahead, the Haimen bridge can be seen in lifted position.

The Haihe River Channel varies in depth between 4 m to 8 m with a minimum bottom width of 50 m and a maximum of 120 m. It can handle vessels of up to 5,000 DWT in the section between the Xingang Shiplock and the Haimen Bridge, and up to 3,000 DWT and 31 m air draft from the Haimen Bridge to the Second Tidal Barrier. This capacity will be reduced to 1,000 DWT once the planned fixed bridges in the Haihe are built.

The Beitangkou Channel (北塘口航道) is at present a natural shallow-water buoyed channel capable of handling barges, fishing boats and service vessels of up to 1,000 gt. It is currently being dredged to 7.9 m depth, 190 m width.

The channels serving the other three port areas are being expanded and will become open as said areas become open. The Nangang Channel was activated in July 2011 on a trial basis. At present it extends 19 km and is dredged to a 5,000 DWT capacity (100 m wide, 6.5 m deep). According to plans, it will reach 100,000 DWT capacity by as early as 2015. The Gaoshaling Channel is currently being dredged to 12.5 m depth, 150 m width, for a planned capacity of 50,000 DWT in 2015. The Hangu Channel is being dredged for 16 km to a 7 m depth, 75 m width, for a capacity of 5,000 DWT

A number of secondary channels have been set up and seamarked by the MSA and FLEC to divert small boat traffic away from the main fairways. The "Sand and Gravel Transport Boats Preferred Channel" (天津港砂石运输船舶推荐航路) runs to the south of the Main Channel and the Dagukou anchorages, and is designed to stop the dangerous flow of barges and construction vessels that used to cut across NE-SW, right through the flow of large ships. The Donggu Fishing Port Channel runs north of the Dagusha Channel, close to the Nanjiang island, and separates fishing boats from the deep water channel.

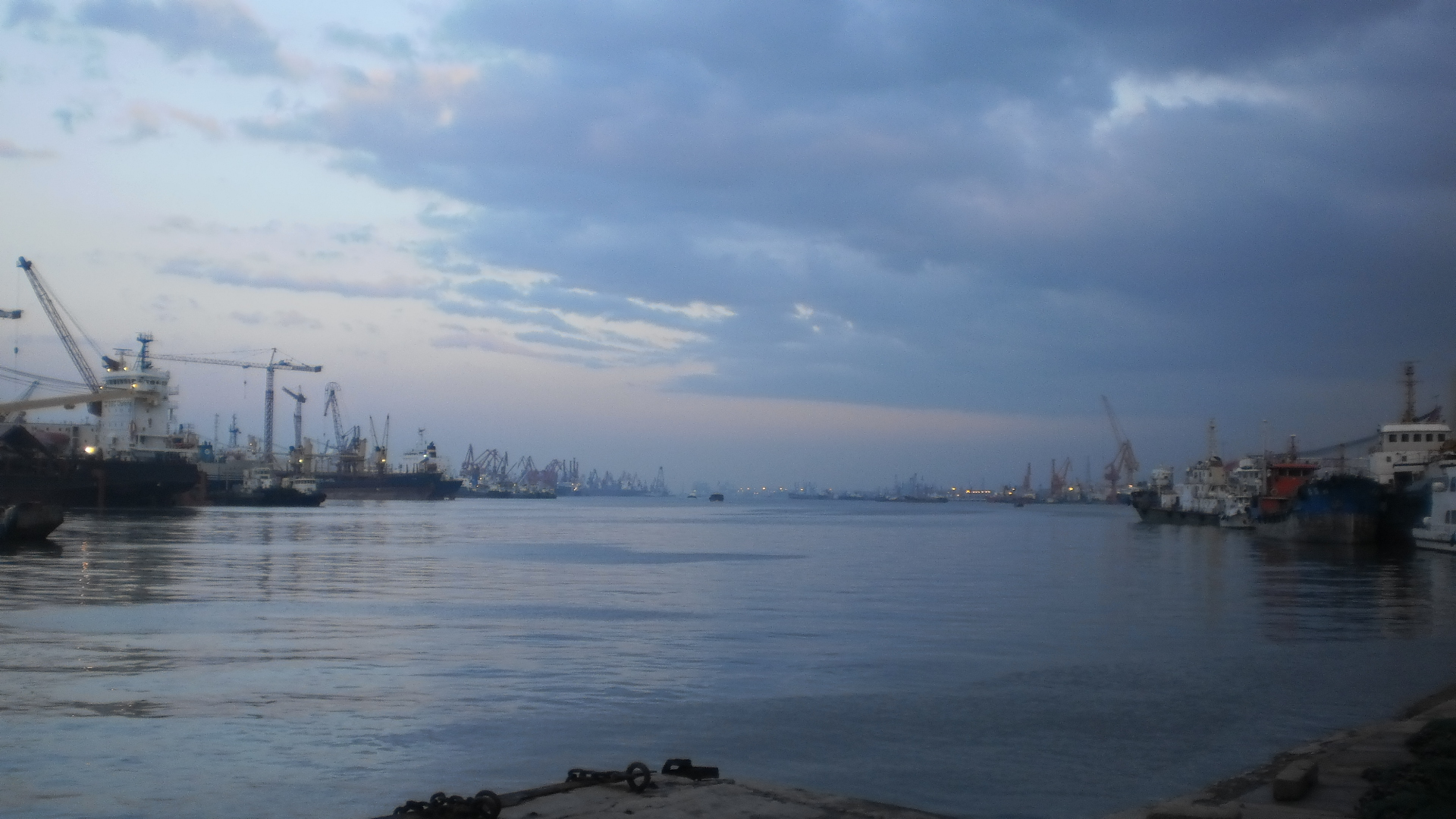
The Tianjin Xingang Main Basin at dusk, seen from the western end of the harbor at the Xingang Shiplock

Harbor basins are breakwater-protected, and include the in-harbor Channels and the approaches to the wharves. The Main Harbor Basin extends 16.5 km from the Xingang Shipping Lock to breakwater mouth, and there are four secondary basins within the main basin, formed by the four jutting piers of the Beijiang port area. The North Harbor Basin is 8.5 km long by 1,100–900 m wide, and has two secondary basins (in construction). The Dagukou Harbor Basin is 14 km long, and tapers down from 1,500 to 900 m wide as it goes up the old Haihe mouth. It also has two secondary basins (in construction).

=== Anchorages ===
Tianjin Port has six main anchorage areas and two temporary anchorages. All anchorages are designated for all functions—berth waiting, quarantine, inspection and pilotage—, and provide little shelter from weather or rough seas. Bottom hold is poor to very poor, anchored vessels are advised to keep five cables of clearance, as anchor dragging is common (up to 5–10 NM in a day in winter, due to drifting ice).

The Dagukou North, South and Chemical Bulk anchorages are situated on both sides of the main shipping channel, to the east of the Dagu Lighthouse. These anchorages cater for the majority of the traffic, and can get very crowded. Collisions have occurred with some frequency in the past. The two deep water anchorage sites are further out into the deeper parts of the Bohai Bay. One anchorage for very large Capesize vessels of more than 150,000 DWT is shared with Tangshan Caofeidian.

Two more anchorages (N^{o}5 and 6) serve the Dagukou area. Both are located on the south side of the Dagusha channel. N^{o}6 covers 40 km^{2}, has depth of 10–13 m and anchors small and medium displacement vessels. N^{o}5 anchorage covers 20 km^{2} and has a depth of 16–18 m, anchoring larger vessels. N^{o}6 anchorage is operational but still little used, N^{o}5 was recently activated (2011) but it is still considered "temporary". The most recent temporary anchorage serves the newly opened (2011) Nangang area. Finally, there is a "Zhengjiatai Lay-By Berthing Area" (郑家台临时候泊区) on the Haihe, next to the Second Barrier for ships awaiting berths at the Zhengjiatai terminal.

Tianjin Port Anchorages
Name	Location	Depth	Bottom	DWT Anchorable	Purpose
North Dagukou Anchorage (沽口北锚锚地)(N^{o}1 Anchorage)	* 38°59"24'N/117°58"18'E * 38°58"01'N/118°07"04'E * 38°56"57'N/117°57"39'E * 38°56"33'N/118°06"26'E	8–13.0 m	Mud	50,000 DWT	All vessels with drafts of less than 10.5 m, except tankers and chemical bulk carriers.
South Dagukou Anchorage (沽口南锚锚地)(N^{o}2A Anchorage)	* 38°55"42'N/118°01"14'E * 38°53"26'N/118°00"39'E * 38 °54"54'N/118°06"15'E * 38°52"38'N/118°05"40'E	12.0–16.0 m	Mud	50,000 DWT	Dangerous Cargo (Oil, Chemical tankers and bulk carriers) of more than 8.0 m draft, and other cargo ships of over 10.0 m draft but less than 13.0 m.
Chemical Bulk Anchorage(大沽口散化锚地) (N^{o}2B Anchorage)	* 38°55"42'N/118°01"14' E *38°56"18'N/117°57"29'E * 38°53"26'N/118°00"39'E * 38°54"02'N/117°56"54' E	10.0 m	Mud	50,000 DWT	Tankers and bulk chemical carriers of less than 8.00 m draft.
100,000 DWT Anchorage (十万吨级锚地) (N^{o}3 Anchorage)	*38°51"49.446'N/118°10"18.033'E; *38°49"43.474'N/118°13"53.163'E * 38°48"07.35'N/118°12"21.13'E; *38°50"13.27'N/118°08"46.03'E	18.0 m	Mud	100,000 DWT	Vessels of draft over 13.0 m
Tianjin and Caofeidian Large Vessel Anchorage (天津港和唐山港曹妃甸港区大型船舶锚地) (N^{o}4 Anchorage)	*38°53′62″N/118°24′66″E; 38°53′43″N/118°26′43″E; 38°52′06″N/118°27′28″E; 38°52′36″N/118°23′85″E	23–28 m	Mud	300,000 DWT	For very large tankers and bulk carriers. Shared between Tianjin and Tangshan Caofeidian.
Tianjin Lingang N^{o}5 Anchorage (5号临时锚地)	*38°42'.13 N/118°13'.06E; *38°39'.72 N/118°17'.13E; *38°38'.12 N/118°15'.59E; *38°40'.53 N/118°11.53'E	16–18 m	Mud	100,000 DWT	Temporary Anchorage Area
Tianjin Lingang N^{o}6 Anchorage (6号临时锚地)	38°49.56'N/118°00.48'E; 38°48.35'N/118°02.50'E; 38°47.50'N/118°01.75'E; 38°48.75'N/117°59.72'E	12 m	Mud	50,000 DWT	
Tianjin Nangang Industrial Area Temporary Anchorage(天津南港工业区临时锚地)	38°44′58″.0 N/117°56′03″.0E; 38°44′55″.0 N/118°02′57″.0E; 38°43′17″.5 N/118°02′55″.5E; 38°43′21″.0 N/117°56′01″.5E	9.0–12.5 m	Mud		Temporary, opened in 2011
Zhengjiatai Lay-By Berthing Area(郑家台临时候泊区)	39°01′04″.0 N/117°27′35″.0 E 39°01′00″.0 N/117°27′40″.0 E 39°00′58″.0 N/117°27′39″.0 E 39°01′01″.0N/117°27′33″.0E	5.6 m	Mud		

=== Shiplocks and tidal barriers ===
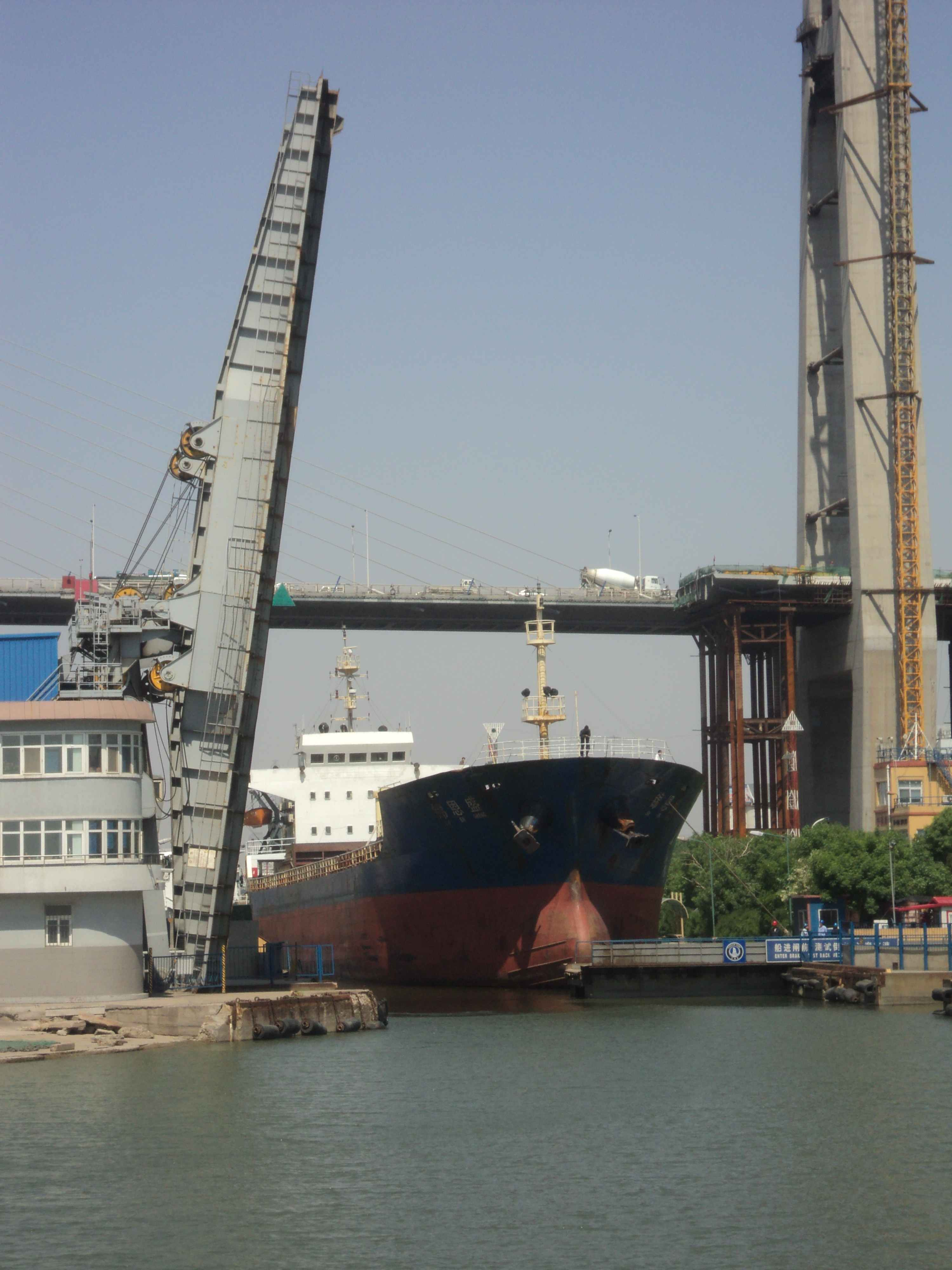
A ship passing from the Haihe into the Xingang seaport through the Xingang Shiplock

The Haihe river channel is separated from the sea channels by three structures: First, the Xingang Shiplock (Chinese: 新港船闸; pinyin: xīngǎng chuánzhá) in the northern side of the estuary is the main shipping route into the Haihe area. It was started by the Japanese occupation forces in 1942, completed in 1943 and made operational by the Nationalist government after the war, in 1946. It has a width of 20.5 m, a length of 180 m and cill depth of 5 m. It allows passage to vessels up to 18.5 m wide, limited to 17.5 m at night and for ships carrying liquid bulk or otherwise dangerous cargoes. The Haihe Bridge is directly over the shiplock, with an air clearance of 39.5 m.

Second, the Haihe Tidal Barrier (Chinese: 海河防潮闸; pinyin: hǎihé fángcháozhá), built in 1958, and last refurbished in 1999, serves as a dam, flood control sluice and tide surge protection for the Haihe river mouth. It is an open sluice design, with 8 vertical-rising gates designed for an average flow of 1,200 m^{3}/s flow when open, with a maximum flow of 1,689 m^{3}/s recorded on 28 August 1963.

Third, the Tanggu Fishing Boat Lock (Chinese: 塘沽渔船闸; pinyin: tánggū yúchuánzhá) is located at the western end of the channel between Donggu and Lanjingdao Island. Built in 1959, it is 150 m long, 14 m wide, 8 m ditch depth, with cill water depth of 2.5 m. It can handle ships of up to 200 gt. In 2011, the Fishing Boat Lock gates started to be rebuilt to allow for larger road traffic between Donggu and Lanjingdao.

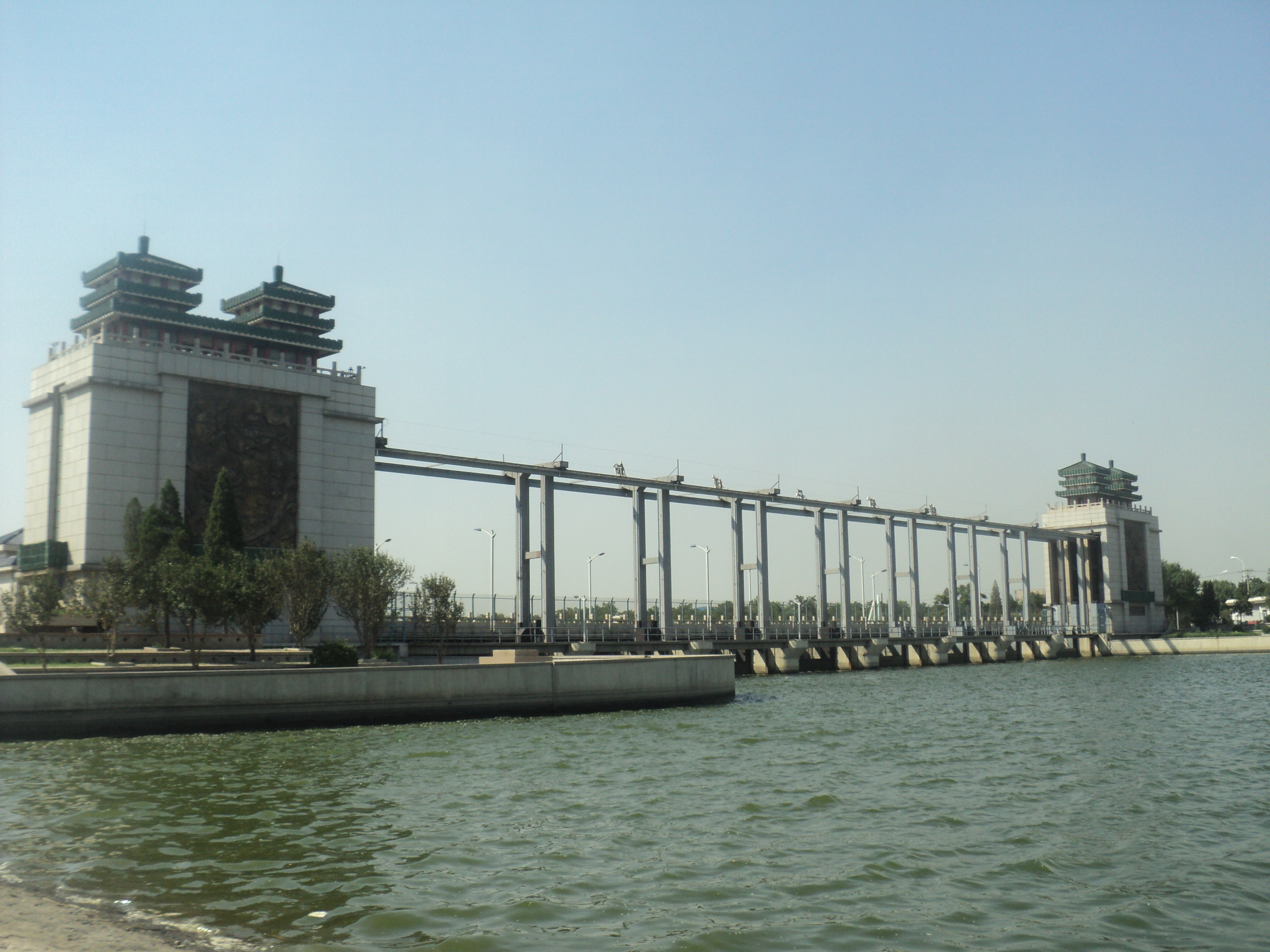
The Haihe Second Barrier from the east.

The final hydraulic structure of the Tianjin Port is the Haihe Second Barrier (Chinese: 海河二道闸; pinyin: hǎihé èrdàozhá) at Dongnigucun, in the Jinnan district. The Second Barrier is also an open-type sluice barrier, with 8 vertical-rising gates allowing an average flow of 1200 m^{3}/s. The Barrier, opened in July 1984, closes ship traffic upriver into Tianjin city proper, and its erection resulted in the abandonment of 29.3 km of navigable channel.

== Port areas under development ==
The last three areas (Gaoshaling, Nangang, Hangu) are under construction, and will be integrated into Port operations as they come online.

Hangu Port Area (Chinese: 汉沽港区; pinyin: hàngū gǎngqū) comprises the Tianjin Central Fishing Port (天津中心渔港), which is located at Caijiabao (蔡家堡) to the north of Beitang. The Central Fishing Port is a large (18 km^{2}) mixed development that gathers tourist facilities, a yachting marina, a fishing port with 17 berths capable of handling ships up to 5,000 DWT for a throughput of 17 million tonnes, and cold-chain warehousing. It is expected to go into full operation in 2012–13.

Gaoshaling Port Area (Chinese: 高沙岭港区; pinyin: gāoshālǐng gǎngqū) is located on reclaimed land to the south of the Lingang Industrial Area and north of the Duliujian (独流减) river. It includes the docks of the southern section of the Lingang Economic Area, and will have its own channel. Gaoshaling area will focus on heavy equipment handling and other heavy industrial cargo. The

Nangang Port Area (Chinese: 南港港区; pinyin: nángǎng gǎngqū) is being built on the reclaimed land of the TEDA Nangang Industrial Zone (天津开发区南港工业区), south of the Duliujian river and north of the Ziya river. It will focus at first on petrochemical goods. The first trial wharf opened in 2011.

== Geophysical setting ==
=== Geology ===
The coastal area of Tianjin municipality prior to development was dominated by mudflats, salt marshes (and salterns), and coastal shallows. This littoral zone is wide and slopes gently: the 0 m isobath (the intertidal flats) extends to 3–8 km from shore at a slope of 0.71–1.28%, the −5 m isobath extends 14–18 km from shore, and the −10 m isobath reaches 22–36 km from shore. These features make deep water navigation dependent on extensive dredging, but it also means that land reclamation is a cost-effective option for construction. Tianjin Port is thus by necessity largely man-made through dredging and reclamation.

Soil geology: As it is largely built on man-made surfaces, Tianjin Port's engineering geology is fairly regular:

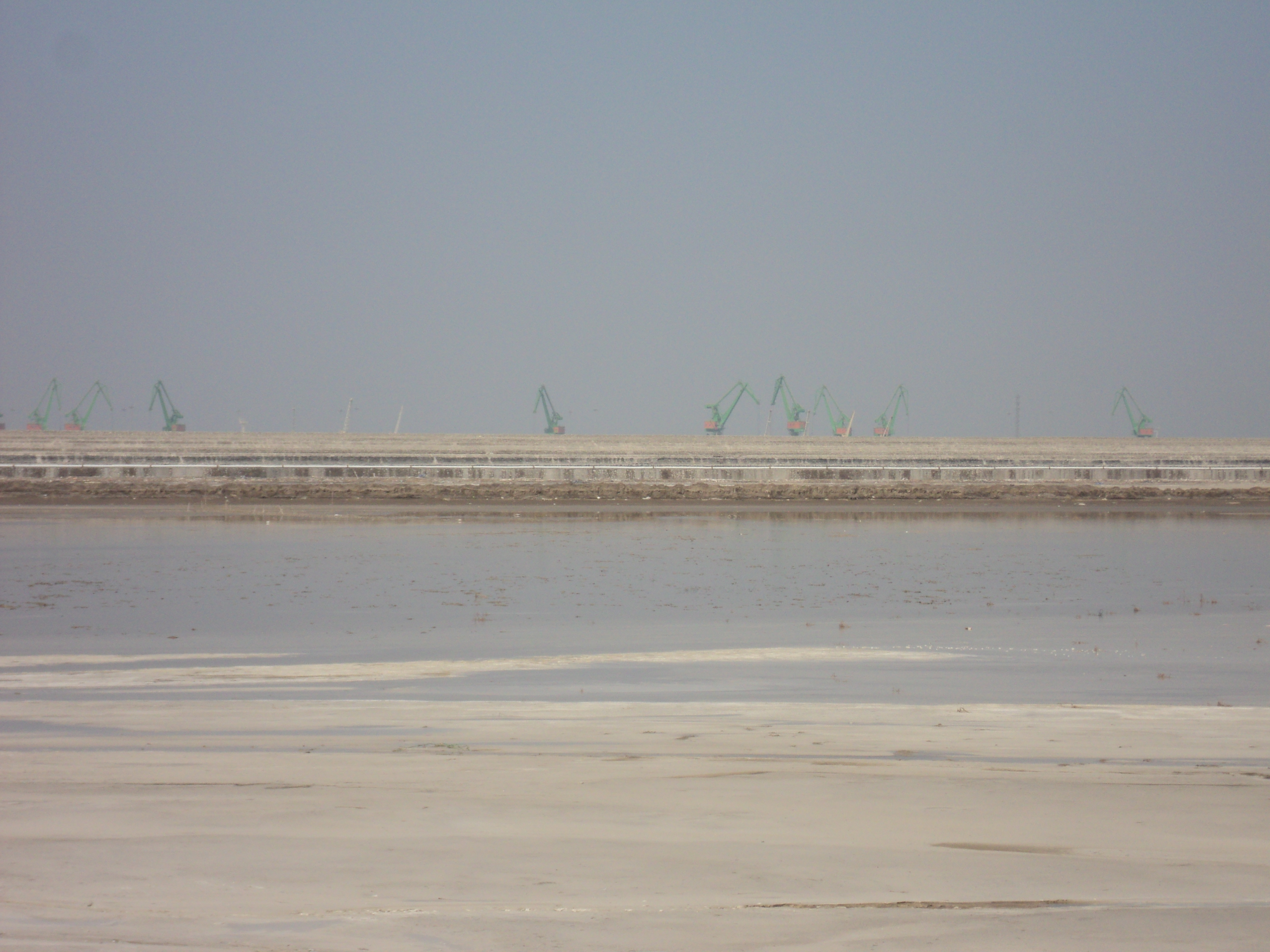
A surviving salt flat at the Northern Basin of the Tianjin Port. Background are the cranes of the Huicheng terminal.

1. A layer of artificial fill from +4.6 m to +2.0 m of elevation. On older parts of the Port, this layer was placed by jetting dredged material, which made the dredged silty clay finer. More recent construction uses the vacuum preloading method, which results in better compacted surfaces.
2. A layer of marine deposits of silt and silty clay interspersed with sand, of recent date (~800 years BP). It is around 15 m thick, highly waterlogged, and considered a risk to liquefy during an earthquake.
3. A layer of alluvial deposit of the Holocene estuary delta. This is mostly cohesive soil (silty clay) and silty sand, horizontally stratified. At −21 m there is a dense layer of fine sand, which provides good support for piles and foundations. although in newer construction, piling usually extends to −36 m or beyond. Bedrock is not reached at engineering depths (shallowest seams are 180 m)

Seismological Conditions: The area of Tianjin is very seismically active. The 1976 Tangshan earthquake affected the harbor and caused serious damage to its installations. The Port's current design specifications are to resist earthquakes of intensity 7, to a basic design Peak ground acceleration of 0.15 g.

=== Meteorological conditions ===
Tanggu

Climate chart (precipitation, max. and min. temperature)
J	F	M	A	M	J	J	A	S	O	N	D
2.5 0 −7	3.3 2 −5	6.1 9 1	20 16 8	28 23 15	59 27 20	135 31 23	137 29 23	32 25 18	15 18 11	6.8 10 2	4.9 2 −5
- █ Average max. and min. temperatures in °C
- █ Precipitation totals in mm
Imperial conversion
J	F	M	A	M	J	J	A	S	O	N	D
0.1 32 19	0.1 36 23	0.2 48 34	0.8 61 46	1.1 73 59	2.3 81 68	5.3 88 73	5.4 84 73	1.3 77 64	0.6 64 52	0.3 50 36	0.2 36 23
- █ Average max. and min. temperatures in °F
- █ Precipitation totals in inches

Climate: Tianjin Port is at the northern limit of the continental monsoon climate area. Specifically, it belongs to the temperate semi-humid continental climate type (Köppen Dwa), with a short rainy season in the summer, large seasonal differences in temperature, and large variation in weather year to year. Annual average temperature is 12.3 °C (54.1 °F). The hottest months are July and August (maximum temperature recorded was 39.9 °C or 103.8 °F on 24 July 1955), and the coldest is January (minimum temperature recorded was −18.3 °C or −0.9 °F on 17 January 1953). The average relative humidity is 65%, with a maximum of 100% recorded in summer, and a minimum of 3% recorded in winter.

Precipitation and Storms Average annual precipitation is 602.9 mm (23.7 in), with rainfall concentrated on the rainy months of July and August. Maximum recorded annual rainfall was in 1964 (1,083.5 mm), and minimum recorded annual rainfall was in 1968 (278.4 mm). The maximum single day precipitation recorded occurred on 30 July 1975 (191.5 mm). The average number of thunderstorms is 27.5 per year, mostly breaking out in June and July. Due to its shallowness and narrowness, the Tianjin coast is prone to storm surges: since 1860 there has been 30 storm surges, around once every 4 years, most recently in 2003, 2009 and 2011. Of the nine serious surges in the last hundred years, five were caused by typhoons (the Bohai Bay is at the northernmost range of the Pacific typhoon corridor), and four by winter cyclones.

Wind rose for the Port of Tianjin

Winds: Average annual wind velocity is 4.43 m/s; Easterly winds have the fastest average velocity, averaging 6.51 m/s. Strongest (steady) wind recorded was a WNW blowing at 33 m/s, on 3 January 1986. Winds over category 7 are observed for 1–7% of the year. Predominant winds are:

- Spring: SW
- Summer: SE
- Autumn: SW
- Winter: NW

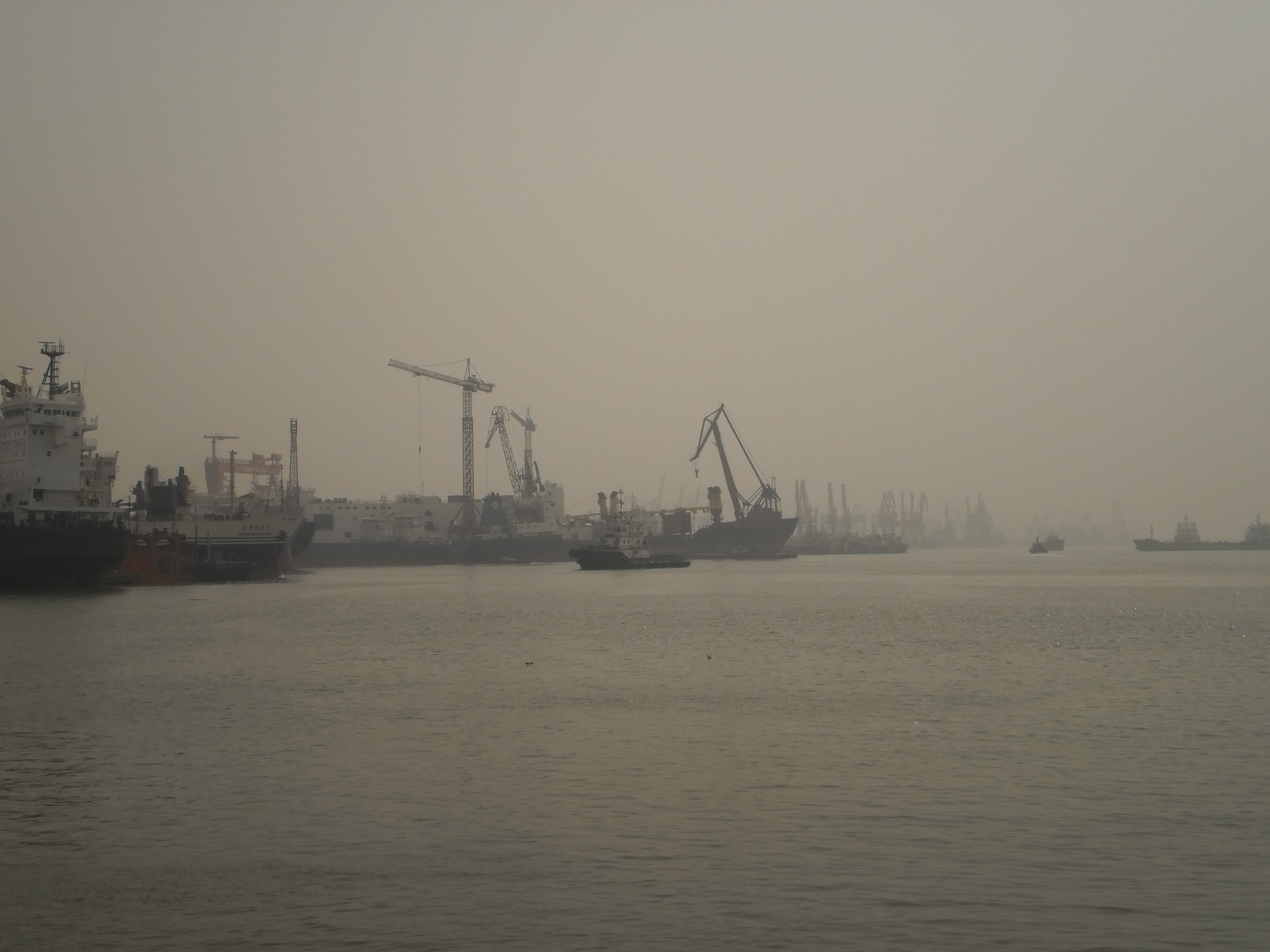
Hazy mid-April afternoon in the Beijiang Port Area.

Fog: Fog or haze is present around one third of the year, particularly during winter. Of these hazy days, there is an average of 16.5 fog days per year with visibility of less than one kilometer (a visibility level that triggers severe restriction of traffic in the port). The foggiest year on record was 1972, with 26 days; foggiest month was January 1973 with 12 days. Like other regions in the North China Plain, Tianjin Port is prone to pollution haze. This haze can be a navigational problem when combined with foggy conditions.

=== Hydrology ===
The Bohai Bay is one of the three bays that compose the Bohai Sea. The Bay is a semi-enclosed, fairly shallow water basin, with average depth below 10 m. It has relatively poor water exchange into the Bohai Sea, and in turn the Bohai Sea exchanges poorly with the Yellow Sea (it can take 40 to 200 years for complete water turnaround), which means that both silt and pollution runoff accumulates in the Bay.

Tides: Tanggu has a mixed semidiurnal tide. The lunitidal interval is 45 min, the average duration of rise is 5 h 40 min, and the average duration of fall is 6 h 53 min. The daily inequality between low waters is particularly marked. Average tide heights at the Tanggu Oceanic Station (塘沽海洋站) are: (Note: The Chart datum used for these tide values is the 1985 National Datum Mark (国家高程基准), which is an adjustment of the 1956 Yellow Sea Datum. The Admiralty chart datum uses the local LAT, and the NGA presents approximate data, so the numbers disagree slightly. The old "Dagu Zero" (大沽零点), the first of the six Chinese chart datums, was developed at the Dagu tide station and it is sometimes still found in some older charts (particularly of the Haihe). Dagu Zero is 1.163 m higher than the 1985 Datum.)

- Mean Sea Level: 2.56 m
- Mean High Water (MHW): 3.74 m
- Mean Higher High Water (MHHW – Admiralty Datum): 3.7 m
- Mean Lower High Water (MLHW – Admiralty Datum): 3.6 m
- Mean Low Water (MLW): 1.34 m
- Mean Higher Low Water (MHLW – Admiralty Datum): 1.7 m
- Mean Lower Low Water (MLLW – Admiralty Datum): 0.7 m
- Mean Tidal Range: 2.47 m
- Mean Tidal Range Springs: 3.5 m (NGA approximation)
- Mean Tidal Range Neaps: 2 m (NGA approximation)
- Maximum High Tide Recorded: 5.83 m(September 1992)
- Minimum Low Tide Recorded: −1.08 m (18 December 1957)
- Maximum Tidal Range Recorded: 4.37 m (26 October 1980)

Major Tidal Constituents
Constituent	Species	Amplitude (H)	Phase (φ)
M_{2}	Lunar Semidiurnal	117 cm	90°/hr
S_{2}	Solar Semidiurnal	34 cm	165°/hr
K_{1}	Lunar Diurnal	36 cm	154°/hr
O_{1}	Lunar Diurnal	27 cm	99°/hr
(HO_{1} + HK_{1}) / HM_{2} = 0.53.

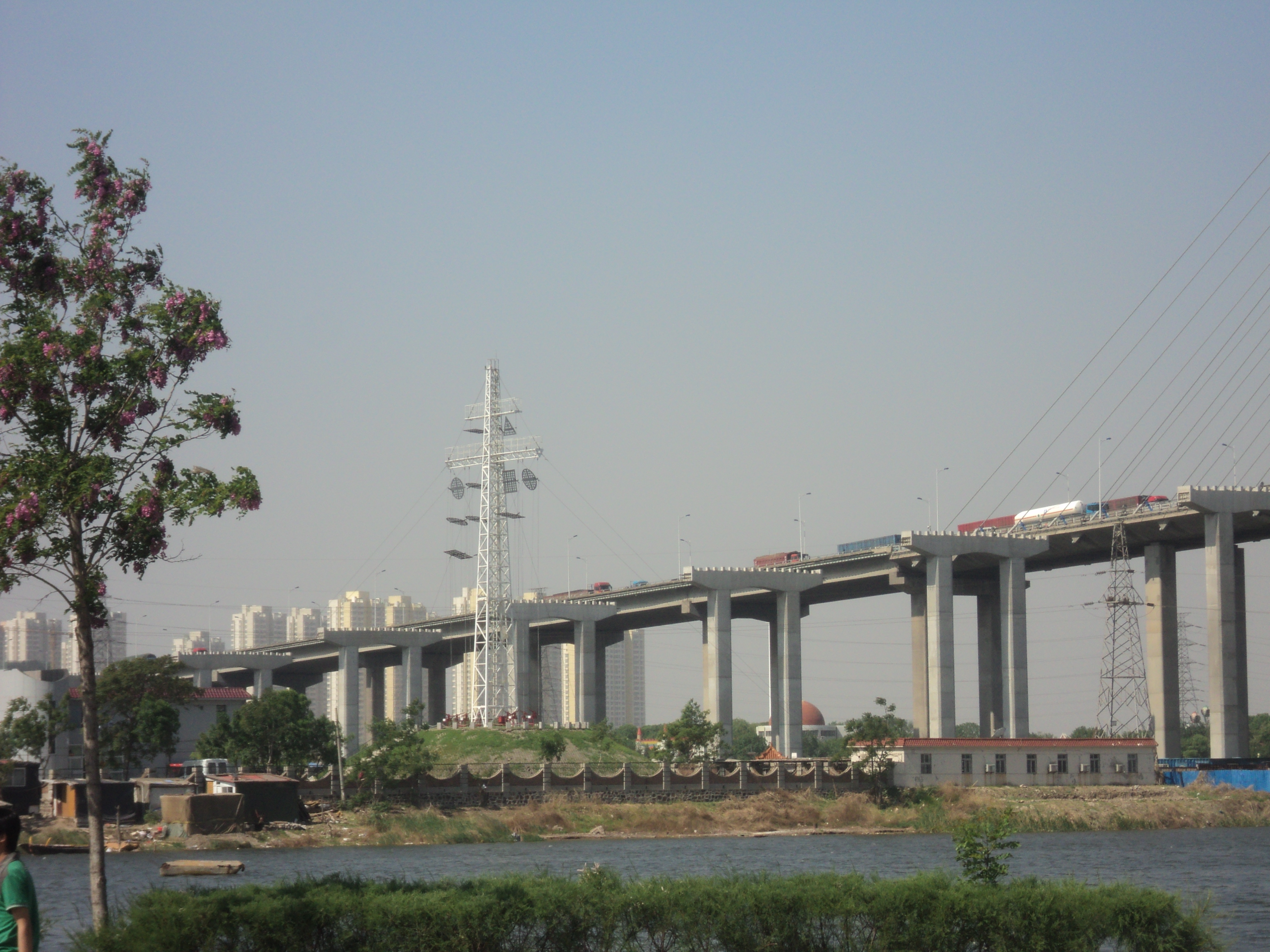
The Tidal Signal Station at the western end of the Nanjiang Island

The design water levels for port facilities are:

- Design high water level: 4.30 m
- Design low water level: 0.50 m
- Extreme high water level: 5.88 m
- Extreme low water level: -1.29 m

Tidal currents: Flood tide at the Dagukou Anchorage flows northwest (average bearing 292°), at an average speed of 0.8 knots, and a maximum of 1.9 knots. Ebbing tide flows to the southeast (130° average bearing), at an average speed of 0.7 knots, and a maximum of 1 knot. Tide currents within breakwaters are parallel to the channel and have a maximum speed of 0.64 knots.

Waves:

Wave rose for the Port of Tianjin

The western Bohai Bay is a relatively calm body of water. The frequency of waves below 1.0 m height is 87.6%, of waves of height above 1.0 m is 12.4%, waves above 2.0 m is 1.9% and waves above 3.0 m is 0.4%. The proportion of pure wind waves is 74.2%, of pure swell waves is 0.9%, and of mixed swell/wind is 24.9%. Predominant wave directions are NNE-E (9.68% frequency), ENE-E (9.53%) S (9.27%), SSE (8.91%) and SE (8.30%). Waves are strongest in spring and weakest in fall. Summers are very calm, unless typhoons wander off far enough north. Strongest average waves are ENE and NNW waves.

Icing: Ice cover in the Bohai Bay is highest in February. Shore icing extends an average of 500 m, with an average thickness of 10–25 cm, maximum of 40 cm. Drift ice extends 15–20 nm, roughly to the 10–15 m isobath. Average drift ice thickness is around 5 cm, maximum thickness is 20–25 cm. Ice flows are SE–NW, at an average speed of 30 cm/s, maximum of 100 cm/s. Icing is a regular problem for the Haihe river port area, and requires continuous clearing. Icing is not normally a navigational hazard at the seaport, except on extremely severe winters like the 2009–2010 winter (the severest in over 30 years). Seasonal buoyage change is necessary.

Sedimentation: Silting was long considered an insurmountable obstacle to deep-water navigation at Tanggu. However, the extensive hydraulic work of the last decades, in particular the damming of the Haihe, has reduced silting to manageable levels, reducing average estuary water sediment from 0.75 kg/m^{3} to 0.1 kg/m^{3}

Pollution: Severe eutrophication caused by polluted runoff has made red tides in the Bohai Bay common. Combined with overfishing, this has put pressure on once-abundant fish stocks. Biological pollution is also a problem, with illegal ballast water discharges creating a strong danger of invasive exotic species. Habitat destruction caused by reclamation has damaged coastal wetlands, intertidal flats and shallow water hatcheries essential for many fish and bird species.
