= 3382 =

3382 may refer to:

- Seven & I Holdings Co. (Tokyo Stock Exchange code: 3382), Japanese retailer
- Tianjin Port Development (Hong Kong Stock Exchange code: 3382), Chinese logistics company
- 3382 BC, a year in the 34th century BC

== See also ==
- NGC 3382, two stars in the constellation Leo Minor
- 3382 Cassidy, a minor planet discovered in 1948
- Executive Order 3382 (on Wikisource), an executive order by U.S. president Woodrow Wilson under the Panama Canal Act
