= Tianjin Port Holdings =

Chinese port operations company

Tianjin Port Holdings Company Limited 天津港股份有限公司
- Company type: public
- Traded as: SSE: 600717
- Industry: Port operations
- Founded: 1992
- Headquarters: Tianjin, China
- Area served: China
- Key people: Chairman: Mr. Yu Rumin
- Parent: Tianjin Port (Group)
- Website: Tianjin Port Holdings Company Limited

Tianjin Port Holdings Company Limited, formerly Tianjin Port Storage and Transportation Holdings Limited, is engaged in the operations of Tianjin Port, the warehousing and storage of cargo and the provision of freight forwarding and shipping brokerage services. It is parented by Tianjin Port (Group). Its A shares were listed on the Shanghai Stock Exchange in 1996. Its name was changed to Tianjin Port Holdings Company Limited in 1998.

== See also ==
- Tianjin Port
- Tianjin Port Development
