= Tianjin Development =

Chinese conglomerate

Tianjin Development Holdings Limited 天津發展控股有限公司
- Company type: State-owned enterprise (Red chip)
- Traded as: SEHK: 882
- Industry: Conglomerate
- Founded: 9 May 1997; 29 years ago
- Headquarters: Hong Kong, People's Republic of China
- Area served: People's Republic of China
- Key people: Chairman: Mr. Zeng Xiaoping
- Parent: Tianjin Pharmaceutical Group Co., Ltd.
- Subsidiaries: Tianjin Port Development
- Website: Tianjin Development Holdings Limited

Tianjin Development Holdings Limited or Tianjin Development is a conglomerate engaged in container terminal operations, toll roads, water supply, electric utilities, pharmaceuticals and property development in Tianjin, China. In 2005, Tianjin Development split Tianjin Port Development to be listed on the Hong Kong Stock Exchange.

On 22 July 2015, a subsidiary of Tianjin Development agreed to acquire from Tianjin Pharmaceutical Group Co., Ltd. 67% shares of the issued share capital of Thrive Leap Limited (隆騰有限公司) at a consideration of RMB 2.3 billion. Thrive Leap Limited indirectly holds approximately 51.36% of the total issued A shares in Tianjin Lisheng Pharmaceutical Co., Ltd. (天津力生製藥股份 有限公司), 65% equity interest in Tianjin Yiyao Printing Co., Ltd. (天津宜藥印務有限公司), and 100% equity interest Tianjin Institute of Pharmaceutical Research Co., Ltd. (天津藥物研究院有限公司).
