= Tianjin Port Development =

Chinese logistics company

Tianjin Port Development Holdings Limited 天津港发展控股有限公司
- Company type: State-owned enterprise
- Industry: Port operations
- Founded: 2005
- Headquarters: Hong Kong, People's Republic of China
- Area served: People's Republic of China
- Key people: Chairman: Mr. Yu Rumin
- Parent: Tianjin Development
- Website: Tianjin Port Development Holdings Limited

Tianjin Port Development Holdings Limited (SEHK: 3382) is engaged in port services in Tianjin Port, including container stacking and warehousing, non-containerised goods stevedoring and other various ancillary services. Its parent company is Tianjin Development.

It was listed as red chip stock on the Hong Kong Stock Exchange in 2006.
