= Samuel Mather =

Samuel Mather may refer to:

== People ==
- Samuel Mather (Independent minister) (1626–1671), Independent minister in New England, Scotland, and Ireland
- Samuel Livingston Mather (1817–1890), industrialist in Cleveland, Ohio, and co-founder of Cleveland-Cliffs
- Samuel Livingston Mather II (1851–1931), industrialist in Cleveland, Ohio, and co-founder of the Pickands Mather Group
- Samuel Livingston Mather III (1882–1960), industrialist in Cleveland, Ohio, and executive with Cleveland-Cliffs
- Sam Mather (born 2004), English footballer for Kayserispor

== Vessels ==
- SS Samuel Mather, one of seven ships to operate on the Great Lakes
