= Trumbull Steel financial crisis =

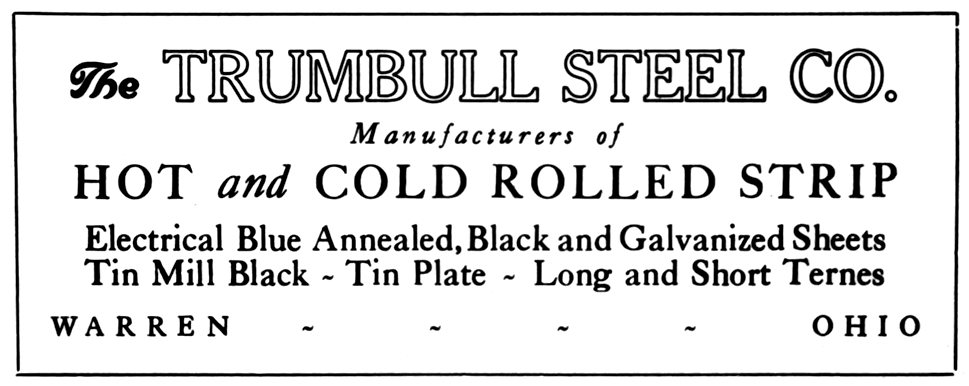

The Trumbull Steel financial crisis was a corporate financial crisis and scandal which struck Trumbull Steel, a steel manufacturer based in Warren, Ohio, in July 1925. At the time, Trumbull Steel was one of the top twenty largest steel firms in the United States (by annual tonnage). The crisis emerged after years of financial mismanagement by the company president, Jonathan Warner. Evidence of corporate distress emerged when Trumbull attempted to float a $20 million bond offering (the third largest offering of 1925). Within a month, evidence of embezzlement by Warner had also emerged.

The company neared receivership, and sought to merge with Otis Steel of Cleveland, Ohio, to save itself. When stockholders pointed out that the bond prospectus was at odds with annual financial information, the merger collapsed. Cleveland financier Cyrus S. Eaton, who had already purchased a large block of Trumbull Steel stock are fire-sale prices, stepped in and saved Trumbull Steel from collapse. Within two years, Eaton had merged Trumbull Steel with Republic Iron & Steel, and ended Trumbull's independent existence.

== Background ==
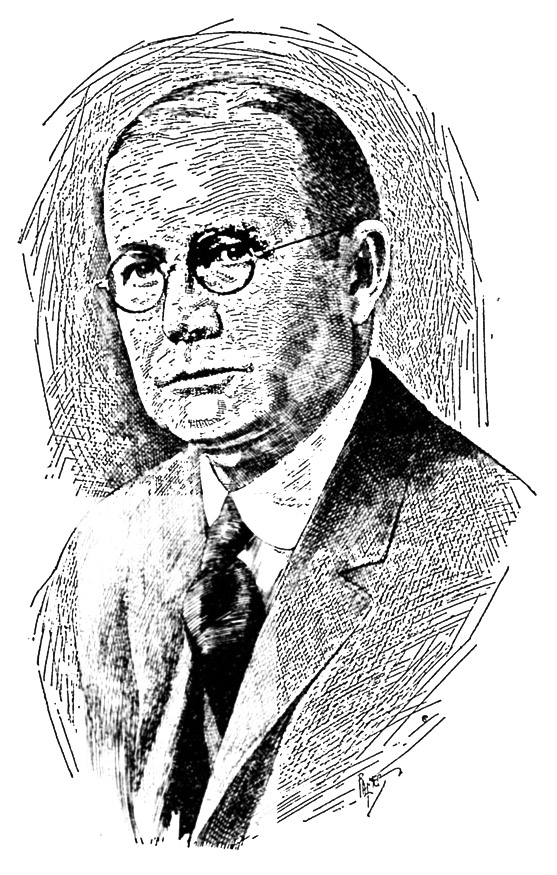
Jonathan Warner in 1925.

Trumbull Steel was incorporated in the U.S. state of Ohio on April 25, 1912. The moving force and founder of the company was Jonathan Warner. Trumbull Steel acquired a site on the Mahoning River at Warren, Ohio, for its new mill. Trumbull Steel's plant opened on July 23, 1913, employing more than 1,000 men.

By April 1915, Trumbull Steel had doubled the number of stands in its mill, practically building an entire new steel factory. Annual capacity increased to 120,000 short tons (110,000 t), and the workforce doubled to 2,000 men. To pay for the expansion, Trumbull Steel formally increased its capitalization to $2.5 million (equivalent to $59,274,000 in 2025).

In July 1915, Trumbull Steel issued another $1.5 million in stock, adding eight new hot-rolling mills. This gave Trumbull Steel a new capacity of 175,000 short tons (159,000 t) a year, making it the largest steel sheet-rolling plant in the Mahoning Valley and one of the largest producers of sheet steel in the nation.

In January 1916, Trumbull Steel issued another $6 million (equivalent to $122,449,000 in 2025) in new stock. and added 16 cold-rolling sheet stands. The company also said it would use the money to build 10 open-hearth furnaces so it could make its own steel ingots and billets. As Trumbull Steel was already one of the largest sheet and tin concerns apart from U.S. Steel, this would dramatically increase its annual output.

In October 1916, Trumbull Steel issued another $3.75 million in (equivalent to $62,010,000 in 2025) in stock. Apparently, the $6 million raised eight months earlier was not enough to build the open-hearth furnaces, because Trumbull Steel pledged to use $3 million (equivalent to $49,608,000 in 2025)< of the new funds to immediately erect five of the planned 10 100-short-ton (91 t) open-hearth furnaces. It also announced it would build a bloom and bar mill.

The company began construction on five open-hearth furnaces in late November 1916. Without informing stockholders or the public, Trumbull Steel began work on a much larger expansion than previously announced, including construction on a new cold rolling mill.

Despite having raised $9.75 million in new capital, President Warner told the Youngstown Vindicator newspaper that "additional monies are needed" and "have been provided for", but did not say where the money was coming from.

In April 1917, the company had decided to make yet another unannounced expansion by erecting a new hot-rolling sheet mill.

By the end of 1917, Trumbull Steel had opened seven open-hearth furnaces and raised the number of employees to 4,000 from 3,000.

Trumbull Steel made an $8 million (equivalent to $113,514,000 in 2025) issuance of new stock in May 1918. In April 1919, Trumbull Steel executives made yet another expansion in the company stock, adding $4 million (equivalent to $55,416,000 in 2025) to its total capitalization.

At the end of 1919, Trumbull Steel added an innovative, new continuous band, hoop, and strip mill, and two new hot-rolled strip mills.

In 1923, Trumbull Steel won stockholder permission to engage in a stock swap that sought to convert its $25 par value common stock into no-par value common. Only part of the new issue would be used for the stock swap; the remaining capital would be spent expanding the number of open-hearth furnaces.

At the end of 1924, Trumbull Steel spent $500,000 on upgrades to its plant. By now, its annual capacity was 700,000 short tons (640,000 t).

== The bond sale ==
Beginning in 1924, Warner's management of Trumbull Steel became a subject of much discussion by the company's board of directors. Pro- and anti-Warner factions emerged on the board, and the issue became intensely personal for many board members.

The crisis began on July 23, 1925, when Warner announced that Trumbull Steel would sell $20 million (equivalent to $292,140,000 in 2025) of 15-year 6% gold bonds to pay expenses incurred for plant expansion. They would not be sold all at once: $2.5 million of the bond issues would be held back and offered for sale at a later date. (Note: The bonds paid 6% interest, guaranteed, each year. Bondholders could request to be paid in gold, not currency. The bonds came due on August 1, 1949.) The firm said National City Co., the investment banking arm of National City Bank of New York, and the Union Trust Co., an investment bank located in Cleveland, had agreed to underwrite the sale. Trumbull Steel told prospective buyers it would pay interest on the bonds before paying dividends on preferred stock. The offering was huge, the third-largest bond sale in the United States thus far in 1925.

Announcement of the sale elicited strong opposition from several Trumbull Steel board members and many stockholders. Several board members had opposed the plan when Warner told them about it, and tried to halt Warner's negotiations with National City. Others said Warner had never informed them about a forthcoming sale. (Note: Critically, Samuel Livingston Mather II, William G. Mather, and Whitney Warner said they were left in the dark.) Some board members said all past improvements had already been paid for, and they had no idea what the proceeds would be used for. National City Co. executives heard rumors that some Trumbull Steel board members had opposed the offering before it was announced, and worried that a divided board might impede the bond sale. (Note: National City Co. even questioned whether the board had to approve the bond issuance, but then discovered that corporate bylaws gave the company president full authority to arrange a bond floatation. Under Ohio state law, the sale of mortgage bonds required approval by 75% of all stockholders. The sale of debenture bonds required no stockholder approval.) Warner assured them there was no dissension at all, and said the key directors had been working closely with him on crafting the proposal.

Several influential stockholders also said they had received no advance notice of a sale from the company. These included John Tod, (Note: Tod was Youngstown's richest man, and co-founder of Brier Hill Steel.) Edward L. Ford, (Note: One of Youngstown's richest men, with an estate valued at $3.5 million, Ford was co-owner of Youngstown Steel Co. and a director of Youngstown Sheet and Tube.) and the Wick family. Plant expansion in the past had been paid for out of earnings, they had been told; now, the company was saying it had gone $3 million into debt to pay for the improvements. (Note: The Youngstown Vindicator later reported that there was another $3 million in "floating debt", primarily credit given to Trumbull Steel by the suppliers of raw materials. The company said it had debt of $3.7 million as of January 1, 1925, which might be that same "floating debt".) Even Mahoning Valley banking institutions said they had no idea what Trumbull Steel wanted the money for.

On July 29, some directors and stockholders asked Warner to issue a statement explaining what the proceeds of the bond sale would be used for. None was forthcoming. (Note: The involvement of the Union Trust Co., which had de facto control over Otis Steel and Midland Steel due to the amount of money it had loaned these firms, gave rise to rumors that the bond proceeds would be used by Trumbull Steel to purchase these two competitors. However, Stanley Russell, a vice president with National City, told the press that Warner had pledged that no bond proceeds would be used to fund a merger.)

=== Discrepanices in financial and bond statements ===
On July 30, holders of substantial blocs of preferred stock informed the press that there was a large $10 million (equivalent to $146,070,000 in 2025) discrepancy between the company's 1924 annual financial statement and the financial information given to the underwriting banks. Somehow, in five months, Trumbull Steel claimed to have paid off $1.5 million in loans (equivalent to $21,911,000 in 2025). The retained earnings surplus, previously said to be $8.8 million (equivalent to $128,542,000 in 2025), had shrunk without any explanation. National City Co. apparently felt Trumbull Steel's finances could not support the bond floatation, for the press soon reported that the bank had successfully demanded that Warner pledge his personal fortune as collateral for the bonds before it agreed to purchase them.

This information triggered "pandemonium in Ohio" and a large sell-off of Trumbull Steel stock. (Note: Cyrus Eaton later recalled that there were 2,000 to 3,000 people holding Trumbull Steel stock, nearly all of them in Ohio.) Youngstown-area investors, owners of some of the biggest blocs of Trumbull securities, "were almost panic stricken" and sold more than 15,000 shares of common on the Cleveland Stock Exchange in the last six days of July, with 7,500 shares trading on July 24, nearly 5,100 shares on July 30, and 4,000 shares on July 31. The price of common stock reached an all-time low, and the Youngstown Vindicator reported that moneyed interests in Cleveland were freely purchasing the common stock.

== Collapse of stock price and exposure of embezzlement ==
President Warner attempted to reassure stockholders by issuing a statement on July 30, saying that money was needed to finance current operations as well as more improvements, such as completion of the under-construction open-hearth furnace, another hot metal bridge across the Mahoning River, and connections to the railroads. That alone, he claimed, would take $2 million (equivalent to $29,214,000 in 2025).

=== Attempt to calm the market ===
Over the weekend of August 1 and 2, Warner re-emphasized the company's sound finances. He dismissed anxiety about the financial discrepancies, saying that changes seen in the bond offering prospectus had been insisted upon by auditors hired by the underwriting banks. He also claimed that he had financed recent "substantial plant additions" "with my personal credit". (Note: Warner did not say which improvements had been funded this way.) He had used his entire personal fortune, he said, and expected to be reimbursed about $10 million (equivalent to $146,070,000 in 2025). He then said that the company was planning to use the proceeds of the bond sale and the unissued stock in its treasury to acquire one or more competitors. His statements, some of which appeared to contradict earlier assertions as well as one another, did not stem the slide: Nearly 5,000 shares of common were sold on Monday, August 3, far more than any other stock on the local exchange, and the price hit another new low.

On August 4, the Trumbull Steel board of directors unanimously approved Warner's bond sale in a post facto vote. In a statement, the board said it was "the best Trumbull could do".

=== Second attempt to calm the market ===
Large numbers of shares were no longer sold during the next two weeks. On August 11, Warner announced that the company wished to build a new blast furnace and an additional seven or eight open-hearth furnaces with the bond proceeds. His statement was received poorly by stockholders: The common stock reached a new record low on August 14.

On Thursday, August 20, a new spasm of rapid selling occurred as 5,800 shares of common were dumped on the local market. The price hit another new low on August 20 and again on August 21. Most of stock on the market was being offered by Youngstown-area investors. Many of these were industry insiders or wealthy people, those in the best position to know if Trumbull Steel would survive or not.

=== Third attempt to calm the market ===
Over the weekend of August 21–23, Trumbull Steel attempted to stem the panic by pointing out how much operations had improved. It had spent $10 million (equivalent to $146,070,000 in 2025) on expansion in the past two years, building a new steam power plant, increasing the number of stands in the cold mill to 61 from 48, opening two new open-hearth furnaces, adding a pulverized coal fueling plant, converting its 16-inch mill to an 18-inch mill, adding three hot-rolling stands, installing a third heating furnace, and constructing another bed for handling hot steel. New molten metal, hot tar, and natural gas connections were made between the mill and the blast furnace across the river, and new machinery installed in the annealing, galvanizing, and pickling departments. There was a new 8,000-square-foot (740 m^{2}) shipping space, a new garage and charging building that could accommodate 20 electric tractors, several new cranes, a device to automate the fuel mixture in the open-hearth furnaces, and numerous other small improvements. The plant's total capacity was now 60,000 short tons (54,000 t) a month, up from 45,000 short tons (41,000 t) a month two years ago.

"Despite reassuring news Trumbull Steel Co. common stock holders continued to be panic stricken". Just over 3,700 shares were sold on Monday, August 24. Another 7,500 shares of common stock were placed on the market on August 25, and the stock reached yet another new low.

=== Evidence of embezzlement ===
By August 23, some members of Trumbull Steel's board of directors had discovered evidence of embezzlement by president Warner.

Board members John T. Harrington and Philip Wick confronted Warner in his home in Youngstown, accompanied by James Anson Campbell, the president of Youngstown Sheet & Tube, and A.E. Adams, a vice president of the First National Bank of Youngstown. The Wick family had founded Youngstown Sheet & Tube and Otis Steel, and Philip Wick owned the important local brokerage firm of Wick & Co. Harrington was one of the incorporators of Trumbull Steel. He was also one of Warner's closest friends, and lived just three houses away from Warner.

In an emotional meeting, Warner confessed to embezzling millions of dollars from the firm to support a lavish lifestyle. He had tried to cover up the shortfall by inflating the value of the company's inventory. He also admitted to spending enormous sums since 1916 trying to grow Trumbull Steel out of its financial difficulties, and ended up only incurring large corporate debts. To cover that up, he had paid dividends out of capital and secretly taken out $17.5 million in bank loans.

Harrington, Wick, Adams, and Campbell agreed that to avoid receivership, public confidence had to be maintained at all cost. They told Warner that they would not seek his arrest and indictment, but Harrington demanded that Warner turn over all his personal assets to Trumbull Steel. Warner agreed. Publicly, Warner would maintain his innocence and claim that inattentiveness had caused "financial lapses" for which he intended to take responsibility. The next day, Warner turned over to Trumbull Steel the deeds to his Youngstown home and his Trumbull County farm. (Note: Trumbull Steel legal counsel John Harrington was named trustee for the property and funds Warner pledged.)

Improvements to Trumbull Steel's plant were halted in late August.

== Announcement of merger with Otis Steel ==
=== Trumbull Steel's early 1925 merger talks ===
Rumors that Trumbull Steel might merge with one or more other "independent" steel firms emerged in mid May 1925. Low earnings by steel manufacturers and excessive competition drove the discussions. The idea of merger was pushed by the Mather family, New York-based investors in Trumbull Steel, and Cleveland banking interests, which felt they could not indefinitely sustain so many indepenent firms. The Union Trust Company of Cleveland was among the northeast Ohio financial institutions explicitly mentioned.

At the American Iron and Steel Institute general meeting, held May 20–21 in New York City, several steel firm executive officers actively discussed merger among themselves. According to the Philadelphia Inquirer newspaper, this time the talks went "beyond the stage of mere discussion". Trumbull Steel was one of the firms at the center of the talks.

By late June, New York City financial interests were pushing a merger of Trumbull Steel Otis Steel, Midland Steel, and United Alloy Steel. This merger was already complete "on paper", and only the details needed to be worked out. News of the rumored merger made national headlines.

Unnamed steel industry executives told the Pittsburgh Post that Otis Steel, long among the financially weakest of the Ohio steel manufacturers, was now at the center of the merger talks along with Trumbull Steel. They confirmed that merger talks between Trumbull and Otis had been going on since May.

=== August 1925 emergency merger talks ===
On August 20, Youngstown area bankers affirmed that a merger between Trumbull Steel and another company was about to happen. William G. Mather, who was chairman of the board of directors of Otis Steel and sat in the board of Trumbull Steel, facilitated the talks between Otis and Trumbull.

Just as it seemed as though the shareholder panic was ending, it began again on August 26 as more than 12,890 shares were sold.

On August 27, the press said that anonymous executives and some of the most important shareholders. at Trumbull Steel, Otis Steel, and Midland Steel had told reporters that a deal was imminent. Final discussions were held on August 27 and 28 at the First National Bank of New York, with representatives from the First National Bank, Union Trust Co. of Cleveland, and the New York City investment bank of Blair & Company present. In attendance were Jonathan Warner, Philip B. Wick, and John T. Harrington. Additional meetings between executives and managers of the three firms occurred in Cleveland, along with local bankers.

=== Announcement of merger with Otis Steel ===
On August 28, Otis Steel and Trumbull Steel announced that they would merge. In terms of the value of the combined company, it was largest steel consolidation in years. According to some press reports, E.J. Kulas, president of Otis Steel, said the board of directors of both firms had unofficially approved the merger, although he also admitted that any suggestion that the negotiations were complete were "premature" and that "minority shareholders are expressing discontent".

On August 29, Kulas surprised industry observers by announcing that official action by each board would be delayed for 10 days, to September 11. The reason, he said, was that a "difference of opinion" had emerged as to the value of Trumbull Steel's inventory.

The same day, Daily Metal Trade reported that no independent audit of the company had been made for several years. The Cleveland Press reported on September 2 that it had been two or three years since an external audit. (Note: The last time the press reported that an audit had been conducted was in July 1915. At that time, the audit was conducted by Ernst & Ernst and the appraisal by American Appraisal Co.) There seems to be confusion about this. In late July 1925, the Youngstown Vindicator reported rumors that the plant had been appraised in late 1924. At that time, Warner claimed that "bank auditors" had prepared the company's 1924 year-end annual report. On August 5, Philip H. Shaff, a broker with Wick & Co., claimed that Ernst & Ernst audited the income statement for the first five months of 1925, which had been part of the bond prospectus.

=== Stockholder resistance to the merger ===
Under the terms of the merger, owners of Trumbull Steel preferred were treated the same as owners of Otis Steel preferred. However, Otis Steel had no paid dividends on its preferred stock for three years. Large stockholders also pointed out that Trumbull Steel's ratio of assets to debt was 3:1, while Neither Otis nor Midland had anything similar. Yet, Trumbull was being treated the same in terms of valuation. More than 14,000 shares of Trumbull Steel were dumped on the market, as many Ohio stockholders called the deal "ridiculous".

Youngstown-area stockholders contacted James A. Campbell of Youngstown Sheet & Tube for advice, as that company owned $500,000 of Trumbull Steel preferred stock. (Note: The Cleveland Press reported a few days later than a few stockholders had even asked Youngstown Sheet & Tube to take over Trumbull Steel.) Meetings between Campbell and different groups of stockholders were held throughout the day, and Campbell reviewed Trumbull's finances in an informal meeting with the Trumbull board and several important stockholders.

On August 30, Campbell said he would negotiate with Trumbull Steel management on behalf of aggrieved stockholders. (Note: In terms of net earnings, Youngstown Sheet & Tube was the third-largest steel company in the United States in 1925. The top eight, in terms of net 1925 earnings, were U.S. Steel ($90.6 million), Bethlehem Steel ($13.8 million), Youngstown Sheet & Tube ($13.2 million), Jones & Laughlin Steel ($9.9 million), Inland Steel ($4.8 million), Crucible Steel ($4.5 million), Wheeling Steel ($4.0 million), and Republic Steel ($3.8 million). In terms of capitalization, the top four in 1925 do not change. The bottom four are Republic Steel ($112.7 million), Crucible Steel ($109.0 million), Wheeling Steel ($102.7 million), and Inland Steel ($77.5 million).)

On Sunday, August 30, Trumbull Steel's board of directors acknowledged that it had not formally adopted the merger proposal. According to one report, the only concern for the board was the share swap ratio. Publicly, the board said it was waiting because it would take two weeks to fully appraise the company's inventory.

=== The board learns about Warner's embezzlement ===
On Monday, August 31, the Trumbull Steel board (with Jonathan Warner and his cousin, fellow board member Whitney Warner, absent) met formally with James A. Campbell and representatives from banks in Chicago and New York City. At the meeting, the board first learned that Warner had been forced to pledge his personal fortune as collateral for the bonds. The board of directors suspended Jonathan Warner as president of Trumbull Steel, and set up an "executive committee" led by Campbell to operate the company. The other members of the "executive committee" were director Philip Wick and A.E. Adams, a vice president of the First National Bank of Youngstown.

The same day that the board met, stockholder and Cleveland attorney John A. Elden filed suit against Trumbull Steel. Elden claimed that Trumbull Steel had failed to report $8 million in 1924 liabilities to stockholders and had failed to tell stockholders what improvements it had made after spending $17 million. He demanded a new audit.

In a highly unusual move, National City Co. and Union Trust Co. withheld the proceeds of the bond sale from Trumbull Steel, citing discrepancies in the reported cost of Trumbull Steel's large inventory. (Note: This news seems to have first been reported by the Youngstown Vindicator on August 30, a day before most other reports.) The banks's refusal to distribute the proceeds of the bond sale was unprecedented, according to The New York Times. It "precipitated a great furor in finance circles," said Cyrus Eaton later. "I don't recall another instance in the history of finance In this country where a bond issue of that size had been recalled by an important house after it had been put out." More than 15,100 shares of Trumbull Steel stock were sold on the Cleveland Stock Exchange as news of the board meeting and the lawsuit broke.

On September 1, another 4,500 shares were sold in Cleveland, further depressing the share price.

== Warner's resignation ==
On September 1, Jonathan Warner resigned his positions as president and director of Trumbull Steel. In an emergency meeting held that same day, the Trumbull Steel board elected Philip Wick chairman and appointed him acting president. (Note: A member of the Wick family, which had founded both Youngstown Sheet & Tube and Otis Steel, Wick was a stock broker who was also an influential financier in the steel industry. He was a good friend of Cyrus Eaton, and was a director of Eaton's holding company, Continental Shares. Wick was also a director of the Central Alloy Steel Corporation, Ohio Iron and Steel Company, First National Bank of Youngstown, and Dollar Savings and Trust Company of Youngstown.) James A. Campbell was elected to the board to fill Warner's slot. William M. McFate also resigned from the board, but retained his position as vice president in charge of sales. A.E. Adams was elected to the board as McFate's replacement.

=== A new audit and collapse of the bond sale ===
The board of directors also directed that certain items on the company balance sheet be reaudited. Three auditing firms were hired: Ernst & Ernst and Price, Waterhouse & Co. reaudited the entire balance sheet, while the physical plants were appraised by the American Appraisal Co.

The day Warner resigned, National City Co. asked the banks to which it had sold bonds to return them, and said it would ensure that all money would be refunded to them. The Trumbull Steel board of directors admitted to National City Co. that "material errors" had been made in Warner's financial representations, and that the bonds should be withdrawn from sale. Trumbull Steel board member Samuel Livingston Mather II dismissed rumors of fraud, claiming "haste" by auditors, who unwittingly accounted for certain items as both inventory and sales. Denials of fraud continued into November 1925, when Philip Wick said that Warner had overdrawn a "private account" with the company, and mistakenly failed to list the sale of treasury stock in the corporate accounts. Both Harrington and Wick claimed that all corporate funds had been used for plant improvements.)

On September 2, Warner began selling large amounts of his Trumbull Steel stock on the New York Stock Exchange curb market. (Note: Likely to be common stock, as Warner said his Trumbull Steel stock holdings were "largely" common.) He also turned over bonds worth a substantial amount of money to his former company. (Note: By September 2, Warner had left Ohio and was living at a summer home on the East Coast. The press reported he was suffering a nervous breakdown.)

=== Undisclosed loans to Trumbull ===
On September 5, news that there might be large errors in Trumbull Steel's financial accounts, and that Warner might be held responsible for them, leaked in the press.

On September 8, Trumbull Steel said banks had loaned it $17.5 million which had not appeared on the last annual report. To avoid putting Trumbull Steel into receivership, these creditors had now agreed to renew the loans rather than seek immediate repayment. By this time, Ernst & Ernst auditors had confirmed that the company had claimed its product as both inventory and sales. News also broke that the three auditing firms could not agree on the value of Trumbull Steel's buildings and equipment, and Ernst & Ernst was completely redoing its audit.

=== Control of the stock shifts to Cleveland ===
Mahoning Valley investors had sold more than 160,000 shares of Trumbull Steel by September 1. Another 25,000 shares were sold on September 2, 10,000 shares on September 4, and 12,500 shares on September 7. By September 8, the Youngstown Vindicator estimated that some 255,000 shares, or about a third of the common stock, had been sold, most of it dumped by Mahoning Valley investors. While on September 1 the press could report that control of Trumbull Steel was "in the hands of Youngstown men", by September 9 The Cincinnati Enquirer was saying ownership of the company had shifted away to Cleveland shareholders.

On September 10, stockholders representing about 8% of common shares formed a "protective committee" to represent them in discussions concerning Trumbull Steel. Cleveland coal dealer H.V. Gear was elected chair, and John A. Elden secretary.

On September 11, in a tacit admission that funds were missing, Trumbull Steel began selling Jonathan Warner's assets. That same day, Trumbull Steel fired 600 to 800 construction workers, engineers, foremen, and office staff and cut the salaries of its executives in an effort to save $500,000. Two hundred salaried executives and lower-level workers were cut on September 20. By the end of the year, total employment at Trumbull had fallen to 4,500 workers.

== The new audit and its fallout ==
On September 24, the new audit of Trumbull Steel was released. It showed that Trumbull Steel had inflated its earnings by $3.4 million (equivalent to $49,664,000 in 2025) over the past five years; and paid dividends out of capital. (Note: Ohio law prohibited publicly traded corporations from paying dividends out of capital. Trumbull Steel had claimed in 1925 that it earned an average net profit of $2.4 million a year over the last nine years.) failed to disclose $17.5 million (equivalent to $241,016,000 in 2025) in bank loans and $4.1 million (equivalent to $59,889,000 in 2025) in other debt (primarily credit from dealers in raw materials such as coal and iron ore); and inflated the value of its assets by $6.18 million (equivalent to $90,271,000 in 2025).

Most damaging, a "material discrepancy" (embezzlement) of $3 million (equivalent to $44,405,000 in 2025) was found. (Note: Wick admitted in November 1925 that the exact amount embezzled could not be accurately determined, due to the extremely poor accounting methods the company had used.)

The Youngstown Vindicator said that the figure reached in the new audit was really an estimate, as the accounts were in such bad shape that earnings over the past five years could not be accurately determined.

Consequently, the board of directors announced a moratorium on dividends and said accountants from Youngstown Sheet & Tube would implement a new accounting system at Trumbull Steel.

=== Stockholders granted an audit ===
On September 29, an Ohio Courts of Common Pleas ordered Trumbull Steel to allow John A. Elden and the stockholders' protective committee to audit the company for the purpose of ascertaining what bonuses had been paid to directors or officer, if directors had taken due care in overseeing the company, how Warner was able to incur a personal indebtedness of $3 million, and whether dividends had been paid from earnings or capital. The Cleveland firm of Laubscher, Smith & Erk would conduct the audit. (Note: In November 1925, Wick agreed to investigate who among the board, if anyone, had knowledge of Warner's financial lapses, but if this investigation was completed it was not made public.)

On October 2, Trumbull Steel made several new management changes. William McFate resigned as a vice president, and his office was abolished. A.L. Button resigned as secretary, his office abolished, and the duties of secretary turned over to the treasurer. W.H.B. Ward resigned as superintendent of operations, but retained his seat on the board and his position as vice president. Additional retrenchment would occur over time, the company said.

== Cyrus Eaton steps in ==
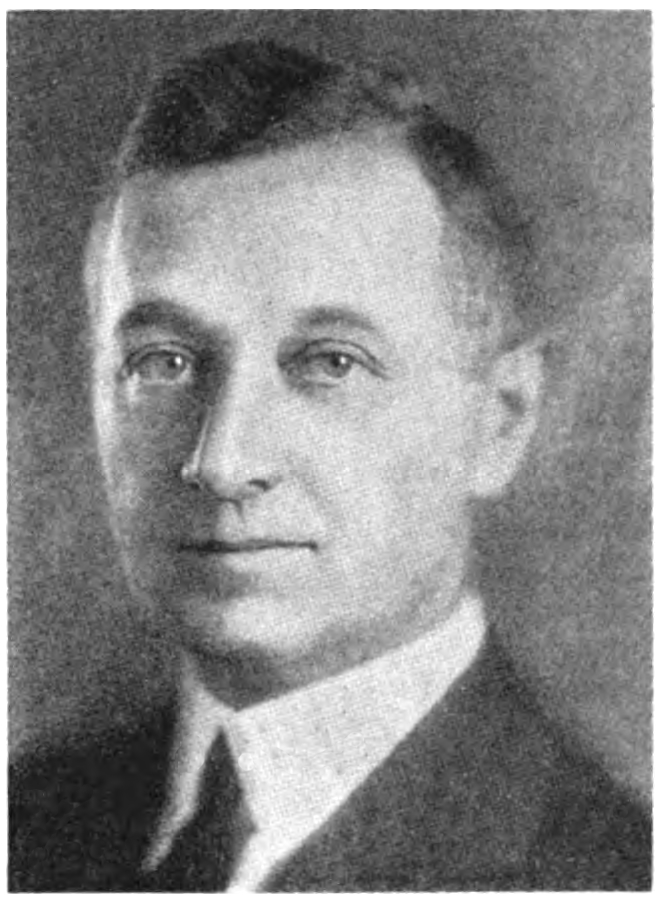
Cyrus S. Eaton in 1929.

At the urging of a friend, shipping magnate Harry Coulby, Cleveland-based financier Cyrus S. Eaton began an intensive study of the American steel industry in 1924. He became convinced that the industry was ripe for merger, and that a large, merged company would be highly profitable due to economies of scale and less susceptible to financial distress in the event of an economic downturn. He began looking for a weak steel company to take over.

When Trumbull Steel's financial troubles began in July 1925, Eaton turned his attention to it. More than anyone else, Cyrus Eaton would be responsible for saving Trumbull Steel. By October, he was owner of one of the largest blocs of Trumbull Steel common stock.

=== Eaton's offer ===
When the scandal broke in late August, the company's financial situation was so bad that almost everyone on the board thought the company would have to merge to survive. Trumbull Steel's executive committee calculated it would take $18 million to put the company back on its feet.

A few days before October 1, (Note: The timing is not quite clear. However, the Youngstown Vindicator reported that Trumbull Steel was rumored to be preparing a bond sale on October 2, so Eaton's reintroduction to Harrington and Eaton's meeting with the executive committee had to have occurred between September 24 and October 1.) an unidentified mutual friend helped Eaton connect with Harrington.

Eaton told Harrington that he wanted to help Trumbull Steel, it was a matter of pride that control over Trumbull Steel remain in Ohio. But Eaton apparently had reservations about Trumbull Steel's survivability. Harrington convinced him to come to the company's rescue. Eaton had already calculated that it would take about $18 million to do so. If Trumbull Steel offered an $18 million bond sale, Eaton said he would underwrite the entire amount.

Eaton now met with the entire executive committee. While acting as legal counsel for numerous utilities for the past two decades, Harrington became acquainted with Eaton. Campbell and Adams, however, knew nothing about the Cleveland man. Eaton made his proposal, and laid down a check written for $20 million. Campbell and Adams expressed skepticism that the check was valid. "If you have any doubt of my ability to underwrite the financing, call the Cleveland Trust Co. and ask whether my check for $20,000,000 will be honored." The president of the Cleveland Trust Co. was reached by telephone. He told the executive committee it would be a pleasure and a privilege to cash Eaton's check for $20 million.

=== Eaton's conditions ===
In exchange for his support, Eaton demanded and received the right to select a replacement for acting president Wick. It was the first time Cyrus Eaton became active in the management of a steel company.

Eaton had negotiated an option which allowed underwriters of the first mortgage bond to purchase up to 100,000 shares of common stock at $9 a share until January 1, 1928. Those who purchased the debenture bond had right to buy 20 shares of common stock for every $1,000 worth of bonds they owned. The price was set at $10 in 1926, and rose $2.50 higher (or the market value, if it was less than that) for each of the next five years. (Note: On October 16, Trumbull Steel common was only selling for $8.50 a share. Some news outlets mistakenly reported that the underwriters could purchase 1,000,000 shares.)

== The bond offering ==
On October 16, the Trumbull Steel board of directors asked shareholders to approve two bond issues: A $13 million, 15-year, 6% first mortgage bond, and a $5 million, 10-year, 7% bond convertible into common shares. (Note: A "first mortgage bond" is a bond which gives bondholders first claim to plant, property, and equipment if the bond issuer defaults.) The proceeds of the two bond issues would be used to pay off the company's bank loans. Under the terms of the bond offerings, Trumbull was required to pay at least 25% of all earnings into a bond redemption sinking fund. Additionally, at least $400,000 a year had to go into the sinking fund between 1926 and 1936, and at least $600,000 a year after 1936. (Note: The sinking fund was overseen by a trustee, who could use the funds to redeem the company's first mortgage and convertible bonds on 30 days's notice at a previously published redemption price. Up to half of both bond issues could be redeemed before maturity.) The board pledged that, if stockholders approved of the refinancing, Trumbull Steel would remain an independent. Stockholders were also informed that investment and brokerage banks had already agreed to take all the bond offerings, with Otis & Co. leading a syndicate of banks taking up $13 million debenture.

News of the bond offerings was favorably received by local bankers and stockholders, and the company's common stock rose 20% on the news.

Under Ohio law, at least 75% of all stockholders had to approve the mortgage bond offering. While initially the press believed Otis & Co. was acting on behalf of New York City banks and the Mathers, within a few days it was clear that Cyrus Eaton was behind the rescue effort. There were already ongoing rumors by October 20 that Eaton wanted to be chairman of the board.

With more than 90% of stockholders voting, 90% of preferred shareholders and 85% of common shareholders approved the two bond offerings on November 10.

Plant improvements resumed. (Note: One of the construction efforts was building a new 100-short-ton (91 t) ton open-hearth furnace. It was completed on December 21.) Trumbull Steel's $13 million first mortgage floatation went on the market on November 11 and the $5 million convertible bonds on November 18. Both issues were heavily oversubscribed. (Note: According to one report, about $1.5 million of the first mortgage bonds were purchased by Mahoning Valley investors.) By then, Trumbull Steel common was selling for $11.25.

The bond offering saved Trumbull Steel from receivership.

== Eaton gains control ==
=== Eaton becomes chairman of Trumbull Steel ===
On December 16, 1925, Cyrus Eaton, automotive executive Joseph O. Eaton II, (Note: Joseph Eaton was president of Eaton Axle & Spring, and a partner in Otis & Co. He was no relation to Cyrus Eaton.) and banker and Cleveland-Cliffs Iron Co. director Edward B. Greene were elected to the Trumbull Steel board of directors. (Note: These filled the vacancies caused by the resignations of Jonathan Warner, William M. McFate, and A.N. Flora. Flora resigned immediately prior to the meeting, but remained vice president in charge of sales. The press had been expecting three or four resignations.) The board then elected Cyrus Eaton to be its new chairman. The board, now dominated by Cleveland-based investors led by Eaton, (Note: Although the Wick family and its holding company, Wick & Co., still controlled a large number of shares, a controlling majority of shares were held by Cyrus Eaton; Cleveland industrialist and banker John Sherwin; and Eaton's investment company, Otis & Co.) appointed attorney John T. Harrington to be the new president of Trumbull Steel. The board also appointed Charles H. Elliott, former superintendent of Jones & Laughlin Steel's South Side Works, to be the new vice president of operations. J.U. Anderson was retained as treasurer. A new executive committee, consisting of Cyrus Eaton, Philip Wick, and John Harrington, was also formed.

The election of Cyrus Eaton as the new Trumbull Steel chairman had been circulating in the press since October. Industry observers also believed that Philip Wick would step down as acting president once the bond sales were completed, and that someone from Youngstown, probably one of Trumbull Steel's plant managers, would be named president. (Note: The local Youngstown press thought Elmer T. McCleary, a vice president at Youngstown Sheet & Tube, or Philip Wick most likely to be named president.) The selection of Harrington surprised several people, including James A. Campbell, Philip Wick, and A.E. Adams, who had actively promoted several Youngstown-area steel executives.

Eaton tightened his control over Trumbull Steel in February 1926, exercising the options that allowed him to buy Trumbull Steel stock at $9 a share at a time when the stock was trading at $13. By April 1926, Eaton and Otis & Co. held a majority of the stock of Trumbull Steel.

=== Trumbull pauses further improvements ===
Before the February 1927 board meeting, John T. Harrington privately expressed his desire to retire as president, but Eaton persuaded him to remain for one more year. Charles H. Elliott, vice president for operations, was being groomed to replace Harrington. W.H.B. Ward, the former vice president for operations who had managed to retain his directorship in 1926, resigned. W.H. Foster, the president of General Fireproofing (which made "fireproof" steel furniture), joined the board as a new director. (Note: Harrington had been on the board of directors of General Fireproofing since 1911, and knew Foster well.) The board approved another round of major expenditures at this meeting, agreeing to spend $1,225,000 (equivalent to $18,245,000 in 2025) to build four more 100-ton open-hearth furnaces in addition to the eight it already had. The cost for the furnaces alone was $800,000 (equivalent to $11,915,000 in 2025), somewhat less than might be expected because the foundations for one of them had been laid back in 1925. (Note: As the company had long planned to build 15 open-hearth furnaces, it had plenty of empty land on which to build. It owned 600 acres (240 ha), of which only 180 acres (73 ha) were in use. The board had considered constructing two 240-ton furnaces instead, but opted for the flexibility of four 100-ton furnaces.)

In April, however, the board declined to take the action necessary to carry out its February expansion plans. That was interpreted by the press as a sign that Trumbull Steel and Republic Iron & Steel were beginning to coordinate their production, and might merge in the near future.

== Trumbull Steel merges with Republic Iron and Steel ==
Republic Iron & Steel, organized in 1899, (Note: The Youngstown-based company was created by the merger in May 1899 by 24 rolling mills and blast furnaces in Ohio, Indiana, Illinois, Kentucky, and Pennsylvania. Five more iron and steel makers in Delaware, Alabama, and Minnesota were acquired by it in 1905. Its last purchase was the De Forest Sheet & Tin Plate Co. of Ohio in 1917.) had been in and out of financial trouble from 1923 to 1927.

In October 1926, Eaton formed a private syndicate of wealthy investors with the purpose of acquiring of Republic Iron & Steel common stock. Stock purchases were placed so widely, with so many brokers, that no one at Republic was aware that any large-scale buying was taking place.

On Monday, April 11, 1927, the Associated Press broke the news that Eaton had acquired a "substantial interest" in Republic Iron & Steel through open-market buying. The Boston Globe called it a "market coup". Eaton was elected to Republic's board of directors two days later.

On Friday, November 25, 1927, the presidents of Trumbull Steel and Republic Iron & Steel announced that their boards of directors had approved a merger. The assets of Trumbull Steel were formally acquired by Republic on April 27, 1928, and Trumbull Steel ceased to exist.

The combined company had assets of $200 million, making it the fifth largest steel manufacturer in the United States.

== Bibliography ==
- American Iron and Steel Institute (1926). Directory of the Iron and Steel Works of the United States and Canada. Twentieth edition. New York: American Iron and Steel Institute. OCLC 7685220.
- Blackstone, Jay (May–June 2020). "The Extraordinary Capitalist John T. Harrington" (PDF). LegalLines. pp. 8–12.
- Gleisser, Marcus (2005). The World of Cyrus Eaton. Kent, Ohio: Kent State University Press. ISBN 9780873388399.
- "Plant for Manufacturing Sheets and Tin Plate". The Iron Trade Review. September 11, 1913. pp. 446–449.
- Temporary National Economic Committee (1940). Investigation of Concentration of Economic Power. Hearings Before the Temporary National Economic Committee. Part 18: Iron and Steel Industry: Iron Ore. 76th Cong., 2d sess. Washington, D.C.: U.S. Government Printing Office.
