= Edward B. Greene =

American banker and mining and steel executive

Edward Belden Greene
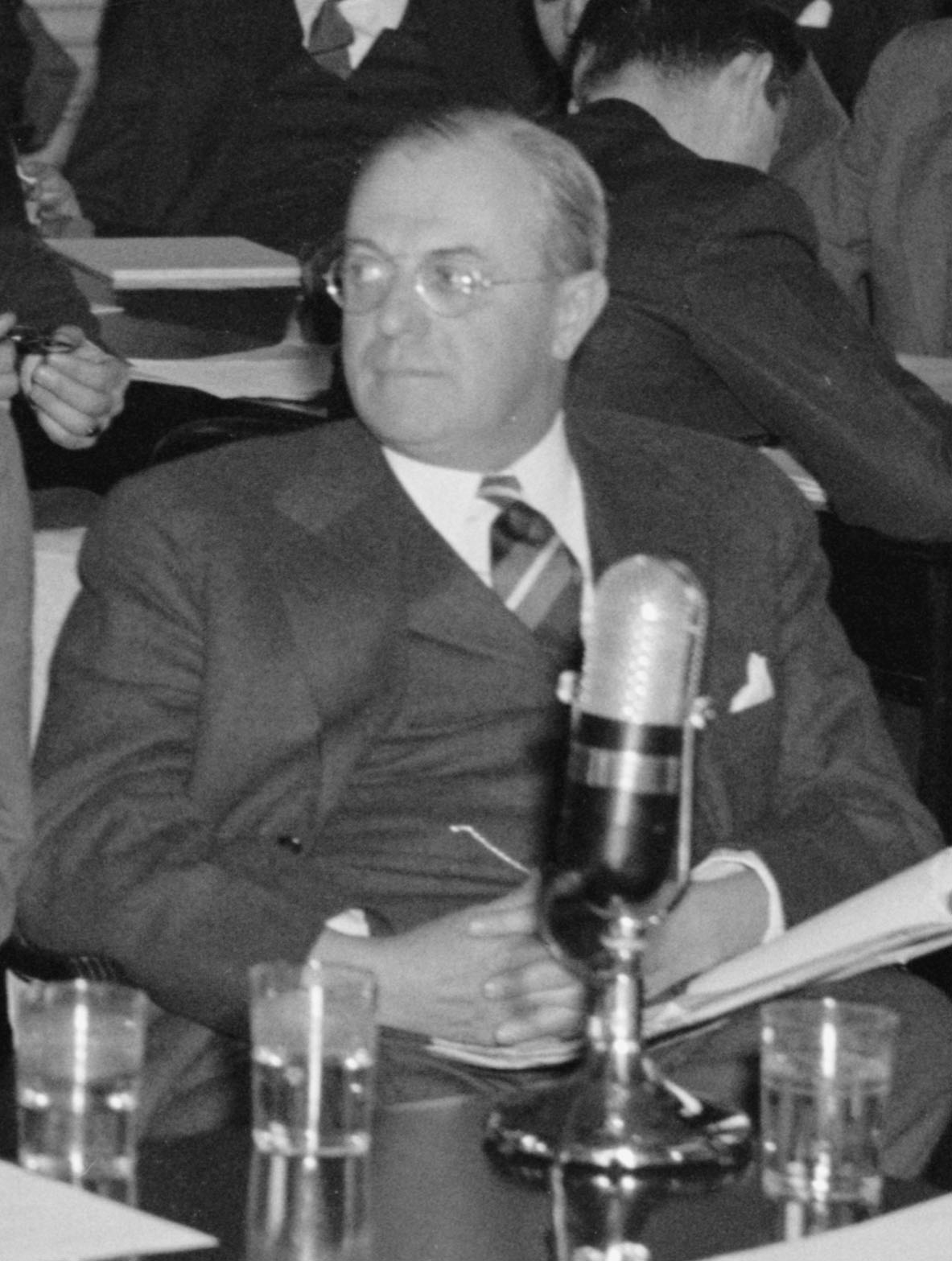
- Edward B. Greene testifying before a U.S. Senate committee in 1939
- Born: July 26, 1878; Cleveland, Ohio, U.S.
- Died: October 20, 1957 (aged 79); Cleveland, Ohio, U.S.
- Occupations: Banking, mining, and steel company executive
- Years active: 1900—1952

Edward Belden Greene (July 26, 1878 — October 20, 1957) was an American banking, mining, and steel company executive. He joined the Cleveland Trust Company in 1900, and by 1914 was a vice president. He later was a director and chairman of its executive committee, and served on state and federal emergency credit and banking organizations during the Great Depression. He left in 1933 to become chairman of the board of directors of the Cleveland-Cliffs Iron Mining Company. He oversaw the purchase of Corrigan, McKinney Steel, and later its sale.

== Early life ==
Edward Greene was born in Cleveland, Ohio, on July 26, 1878, to Jon Eliot and Mary (née Seymour) Greene. Jon Greene rose from clerk at the William Bingham Company (a large local hardware and metals concern) to partner, and succeeded founder William Bingham as president when Bingham died in April 1904. Edward had a brother, William, and three sisters, Mary, Lucy, and Helen.

Greene graduated from Cleveland High School. He enrolled at Yale University, where he graduated with a bachelor's degree in 1900. While in college, Greene joined the fraternity Alpha Delta Phi and was a member of the exclusive Wolf's Head Society.

== Banking career ==
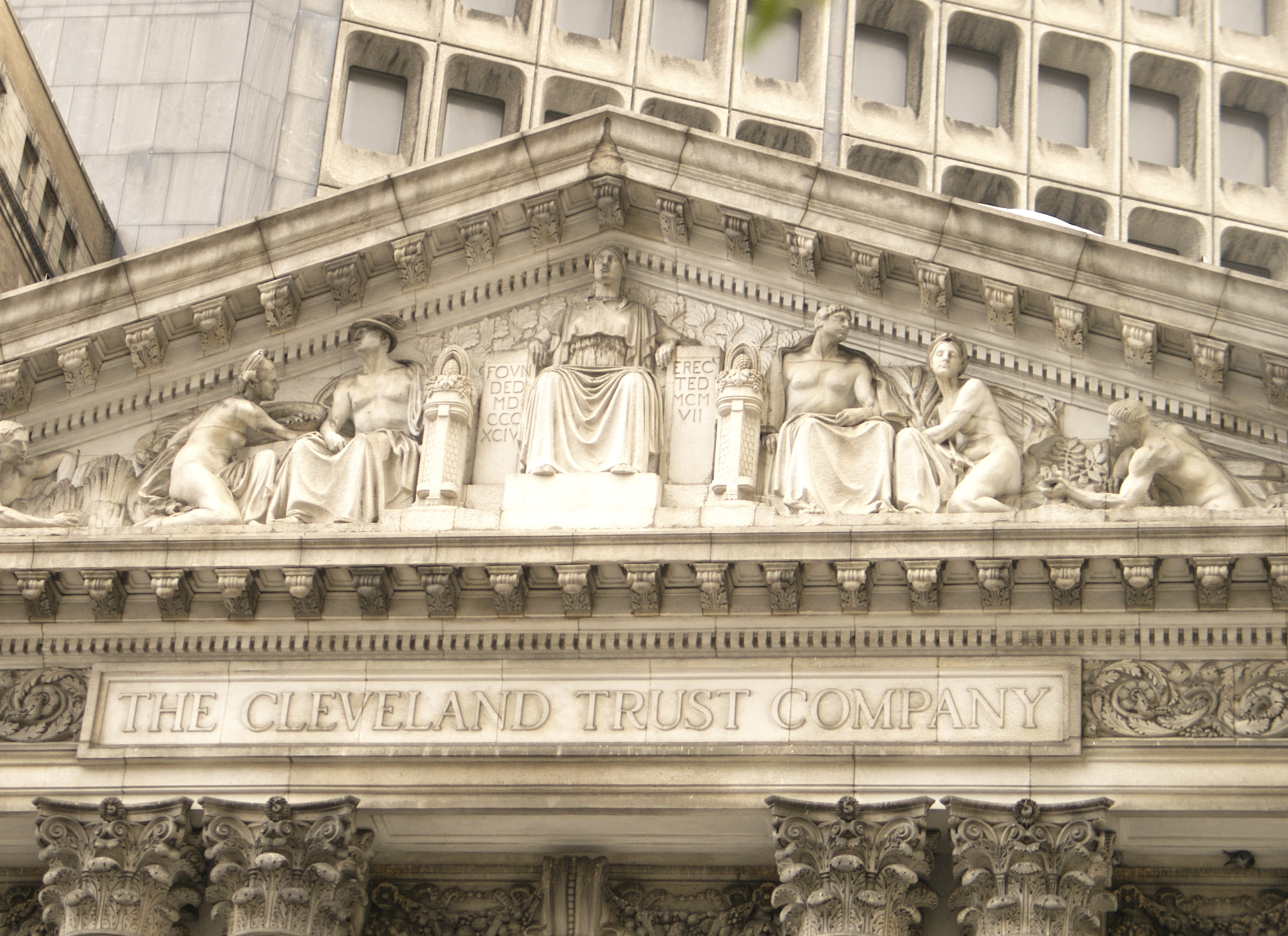
Pediment of the Cleveland Trust Co. building.

Greene began working part-time in 1898 at the Cleveland Trust Company as a general messenger, clerk, and teller. He was made an assistant treasurer in January 1906.

After being elected to Cleveland Trust's board of directors in January 1907, the board elected Green chairman of its executive committee and made him an ex-officio member of all of the bank's other committees. Greene was appointed the company's secretary in March 1911.

Greene was appointed a vice president of Cleveland Trust in January 1914. His extensive outside business interests led him to resign as vice president in 1926, although he remained a director and member of the board. Greene was one of the bank's leaders who helped it grow from a single room in the basement of an office building into a 53-branch regional financial powerhouse. Alexander C. Brown, chairman of Cleveland Trust at the time of Greene's death in 1957, said Greene's "wisdom and financial genius" helped Cleveland Trust survive the Great Depression.

On March 25, 1926, Greene was elected to the board of directors of the Cleveland Cliffs Iron Co.

== Steel manufacturing career ==
=== Eaton and steel mergers ===
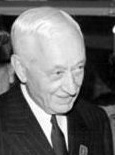
Cyrus S. Eaton

There was rapid consolidation in the steel industry in the 1920s, much of it led by Canadian American investor Cyrus S. Eaton. Eaton entered the utilities field in Canada in 1907, obtaining bank loans and purchasing natural gas and electric utilities, merging them, and achieving large profits through economies of scale. In 1912, Eaton settled in Cleveland, Ohio, and joined the investment banking firm of Otis & Co. (Note: In 1895, Charles A. Otis formed the brokerage firm and investment bank of Otis, Hough & Co. with Addison H. Hough, a Cleveland stock broker and investment banker. It was reorganized as Otis & Hough in 1900, and as Otis & Co. in 1912 upon the retirement of Hough and the inclusion of new partners, among them Cyrus Eaton.) He became a partner in the firm in 1916. At the urging of a friend, shipping magnate Harry Coulby, Eaton (through Otis & Co.) began acquiring troubled steel companies. He purchased a controlling interest in the financially troubled Trumbull Steel Co. in 1925. (Note: These shares were later transferred to Continental Shares.)

In April 1926, Otis & Co. formed a new investment company, Continental Shares, whose purpose was to acquire stock in various steel companies. Eaton owned half the company, the shareholders of the iron mining firm Cleveland Cliffs the other half. (Note: Other investors included business executives like Harry Coulby, Henry G. Dalton, and Samuel Livingston Mather II of the mining and shipping firm Pickands Mather & Co.; William G. Mather of Cleveland Cliffs; and factory owner and banker Truman Handy Newberry. Dalton was also First Vice President of Youngstown Sheet & Tube. As Eaton acquired significant amounts of stock in other steel companies, their executives invested in Continental Shares as well. Among the later investors were James Anson Campbell, president of Youngstown Sheet & Tube; A.E. Adams, director of Youngstown Sheet & Tube and president of the First National Bank of Cleveland; C.H. Booth, director of Youngstown Sheet & Tube; Philip Wick, director of Republic Iron and Steel and of Central Alloy Steel; and John T. Harrington, former president of Trumbull Steel.)

In July 1926, Eaton acquired the United Alloy Steel Corporation, the Central Steel Co., and the United Furnace Co., and combined them to form and incorporate the Central Alloy Steel Corporation. He also began buying stock in the Republic Iron and Steel Company, and by early 1927 had won control of four seats on the company's board of directors. (Note: On May 3, 1899, 24 steel and iron manufacturing firms combined to form and incorporate the Republic Iron and Steel Company. Berger Manufacturing Co. merged with it the same day. In 1919, Republic purchased the DeForest Sheet & Tin Plate Co. In 1925, Republic purchased 50 percent of the Susquehanna Ore Co.) Eaton then began buying shares in the Youngstown Sheet & Tube steel company in 1927. (Note: Eaton's intentions regarding Youngstown Sheet & Tube were never clear, but he probably intended to fold it into Republic Iron and Steel at some future time.) In 1928, Eaton merged Trumbull Steel with Republic Iron and Steel, and Trumbull Steel purchased Sheet & Tubes, Inc. (Note: Eaton also purchased significant amounts of stock in the Inland Steel Company, the Otis Steel Company, and then Wheeling Steel Company.) Central Alloy Steel acquired Interstate Iron & Steel Co. in 1929. By September 1929, Eaton had won a controlling interest in Donner Steel. (Note: On December 7, 1915, William H. Donner, president of the Cambria Steel Company, formed Donner Steel using the assets of the bankrupt New York State Steel Company (which he, personally, had purchased the month before).) In 1929, Donner Steel purchased the Witherow Steel Corporation. In 1930, Trumbull Steel merged with the Union Drawn Steel Co.

=== Creation of Cliffs Corp. ===
Eaton now controlled companies which consumed a good deal of iron ore provided by Cleveland-Cliffs. Additionally, Cleveland-Cliffs had invested in Central Alloy Steel, Donner Steel, Republic Iron & Steel, and Trumbull Steel, and supplied substantial amounts of ore to these companies. (Note: Cleveland-Cliffs acquired stock in Trumbull Steel via numerous small purchases throughout the 1910s. In 1920, Cleveland-Cliffs and Trumbull Steel jointly created the Trumbull-Cliffs Furnace Company, a coking firm. It is unclear when Cleveland-Cliffs invested in Central Steel, but it had a large block of 80,000 shares by July 1926. When Central Steel merged with United Alloy Steel to form Central Alloy Steel, Cleveland-Cliffs received Central Alloy stock in exchange for its Central Steel stock. When Republic Iron & Steel purchased Trumbull Steel in 1928, Cleveland-Cliffs received Republic Iron & Steel stock in exchange for its Trumbull Steel stock. Cleveland-Cliffs purchased additional Republic Iron & Steel stock in 1928 and 1929. Some time before 1930, Cleveland-Cliffs made purchases of Donner Steel stock. When Republic Steel purchased Trumbull Cliffs Furnace Co. in 1930, it paid Cleveland-Cliffs in Republic Steel stock.)

Samuel Livingston Mather II began forging closer relationships with Eaton. Samuel Mather was son of the co-founder of the Cleveland Iron Mining Company, one of the two predecessor companies of Cleveland-Cliffs. Steel company mergers meant fewer customers for ore, which would drive down ore prices. Mather believed he had to have a much stronger relationship with these newly-merged companies. Eaton, for his part, wanted a steady supply of ore from a company with excellent reserves. Eaton put Greene on the board of Republic Iron & Steel in May 1927, and Eaton accompanied Mather on an inspection tour of Cleveland-Cliffs' Michigan mining properties in June 1927 (during which Eaton stayed at Mather's Michigan cottage).

According to Greene, Eaton asked the Cleveland-Cliffs Company if it wanted to become part of his emerging conglomerate. He felt it would be advantageous to Cleveland-Cliffs, but the addition of Cleveland-Cliffs would also help him bring other steel companies into the merger.

Mather and Eaton met in Cleveland in March 1929 to begin working out how the two could work together.

In the April, Eaton went to Mather's summer home in Pasadena, California, where he met with Mather, Greene, Samuel Livingston Mather III (Samuel Mather's son), George Garretson Wade, and William P. Belden in Pasadena, California. (Note: Greene, Wade, and Samuel Livingston Mather III were directors of Cleveland-Cliffs. Belden was the general legal counsel for Cleveland-Cliffs.) At this meeting, Eaton proposed merging Cleveland-Cliffs with his soon-to-be-announced Republic Steel. Mather declined. Instead, the Mather group offered to establish a new firm, Cliffs Corporation. Cleveland-Cliffs issued new 1.25 shares of preferred stock to all of its shareholders in exchange for 1 share of common stock. To create the new company, Cleveland-Cliffs invested 500,000 shares of preferred and 800,000 shares of common stock. Eaton's investment in the new company was all the stock he held in Inland Steel, Republic Iron & Steel, Wheeling Steel, and Youngstown Sheet & Tube. (Note: Cleveland-Cliffs invested approximately $90 million (equivalent to $1,290,651,000 in 2024), while Eaton invested $40 million (equivalent to $573,623,000 in 2024).) Cliffs Corporation would issue 800,000 shares. Cleveland-Cliffs stockholders were permitted to exchange one common share of Cleveland-Cliffs for one common share of Cliffs Corp., while Eaton got the other half of Cliffs Corp. stock. (Note: All the Cleveland-Cliffs preferred and common stock was placed into a voting trust first, to put Cleveland-Cliffs on an equal footing with Eaton. Cleveland-Cliffs' board of directors determined how the stock trust voted; it had to be voted in a block.) Eaton accepted the proposal, which was announced on May 1. William G. Mather, chairman of Cleveland-Cliffs, assured stockholders that this scheme gave Cleveland-Cliffs the inside track on ore sales, and diversified Cleveland-Cliffs' revenue streams to ensure against economic downturns.

On December 17, 1929, Eaton announced that he was merging the Bourne-Fuller Co., Central Alloy Steel, Donner Steel, and Republic Iron & Steel into a new company, to be named Republic Steel Corporation. Tom M. Girdler was named the chairman of the board of directors of the company. Girdler had announced his surprise resignation as president of Jones & Laughlin Steel on October 21, 1929. Girdler had resigned because Eaton, Samuel Livingston Mather II, and Greene assured him he would be chairman of Eaton's planned steel merger.

=== Purchase of Corrigan, McKinney Steel ===
On March 21, 1930, Cleveland-Cliffs bought 62.5 percent of the shares of Corrigan, McKinney Steel. The cost of the transaction was $35.5 million. The acquisition seemed to make sense: Corrigan, McKinney was a ready customer for Cleveland-Cliffs ore, and the steel firm owned several iron mines in Michigan. Cleveland-Cliffs did not intend to get into the steel business, but rather intended to sell the blast furnaces and steel mills to Eaton.

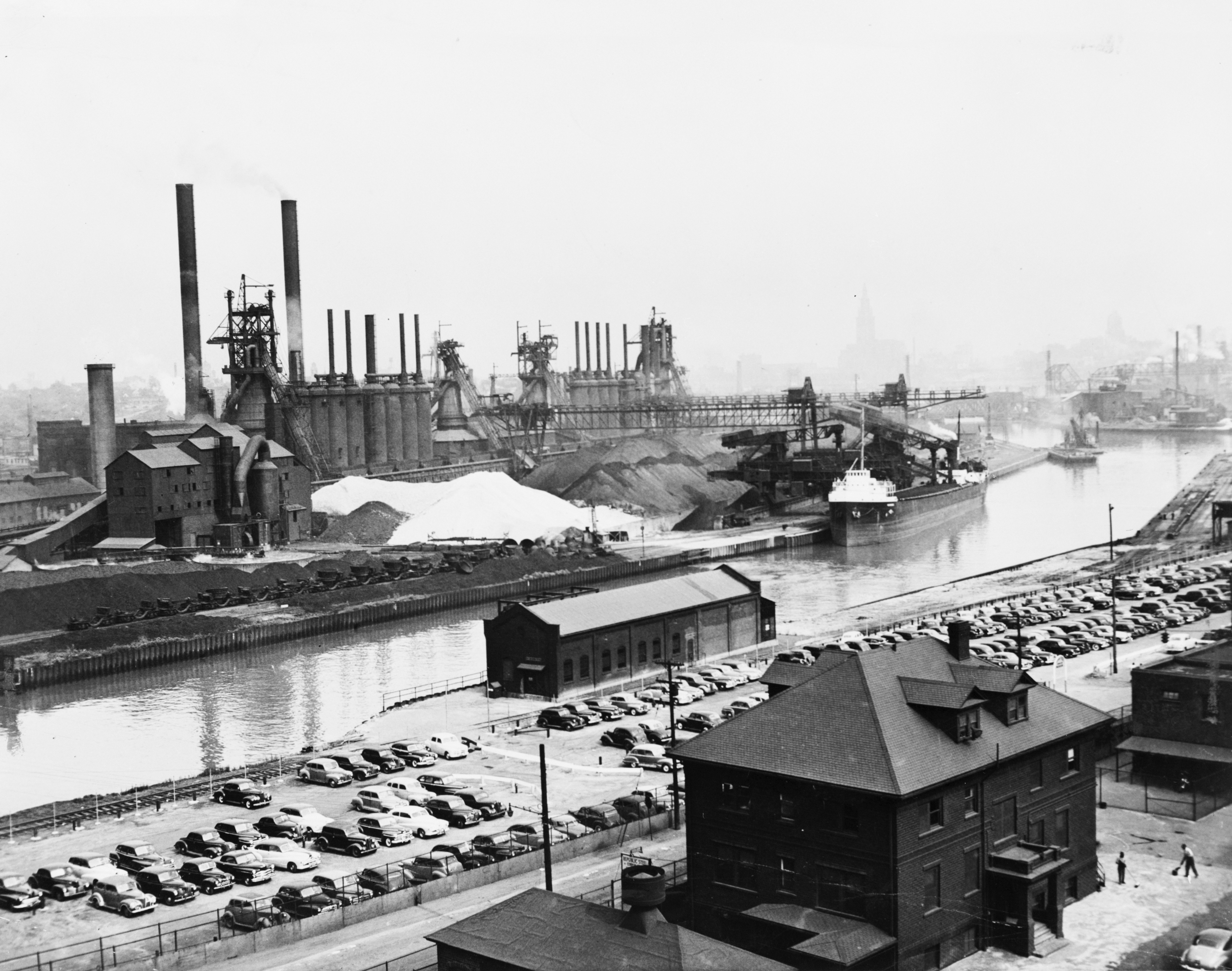
The Corrigan, McKinney Steel works in Cleveland.

To finance the deal, Cleveland-Cliffs paid $5 million in cash and borrowed $25 million from eight banks.

Working with William G. Mather, Greene oversaw the purchase of Corrigan, McKinney Steel. The merger effectively prevented both Bethlehem Steel and U.S. Steel from entering Cleveland. Greene was elected a director of Corrigan, McKinney Steel the day the deal was announced.

The Corrigan, McKinney deal proved disastrous for Cleveland-Cliffs. Although the Great Depression had begun in late October 1929, Greene and other Cleveland-Cliffs directors and officers believed the economy had only entered a short-term recession. They were disabused of that idea by early 1931.

Cleveland-Cliffs soon lost control of Corrigan, McKinney Steel. McKinney Steel Holdings (MSH) had issued MSH common stock and given it to shareholders of Corrigan, McKinney in exchange for their shares. But only 40 percent of Corrigan, McKinney shares had been purchased this way. Another 13.75 percent of Corrigan, McKinney stock had been purchased with MSH preferred stock. The Union Trust Company of Cleveland and more than 1,000 members of the public owned the shares of MSH preferred. Under normal circumstances, MSH common stock had voting privileges; MSH preferred did not. However, if dividends on MSH preferred were not made, the MSH common stock lost its voting privileges and MSH preferred gained them. In other words, due to the way MSH common and preferred stock had been issued, just 13.75 percent of all Corrigan, McKinney shares could control 53.75 percent of Corrigan, McKinney shares if dividends ceased.

Cleveland-Cliffs owned only 88 of the 72,500 shares of MSH preferred. To keep control of Corrigan, McKinney, Cleveland-Cliffs had to ensure that Corrigan, McKinney paid the required preferred dividend to MSH so that MSH could pass it on to MSH preferred stockholders to keep them happy, even though Cleveland-Cliffs could ill-afford to do so. (Note: With Corrigan, McKinney losing money and unable to pay dividends itself, Cleveland-Cliffs would have to loan or grant it money pay those dividends. While Cleveland-Cliffs had a profit of $4.8 million in the year ending December 31, 1930, it lost $21,360 in 1931, lost $2.5 million in 1932, and had a profit of $105,274 in 1933.)

Cleveland-Cliffs was also having trouble paying its debt. The short-term loans it had taken out to finance the steel mill's purchase carried a high interest rate. By 1931, the company was having trouble making its loan payments. It tried to convert the short-term debt to long-term, low-interest bonds, but the economic conditions in the U.S. made it impossible to find any buyers. Cleveland-Cliffs was forced to sell one-year notes instead, and even then had great difficulty placing the loans. William G. Mather even pledged part of his personal fortune as collateral in order to find buyers.

In June 1933, at the urging of the company's lenders, Greene was appointed executive vice president of Cleveland-Cliffs. In this new role, he assisted the 75-year-old Mather in negotiating extensions of the company's loans. Two months later, Mather resigned as president of Cleveland-Cliffs and took the role of "honorary board chairman". Greene was appointed the new president, overseeing day-to-day operations of the company. Despite his heavy new responsibilities, Greene remained chairman of the Cleveland Trust executive committee and a director of that bank.

=== Sale of Corrigan, McKinney Steel ===
Upon taking up the presidency of Cleveland-Cliffs, Greene told its board of directors that some assets might have to be sold in order for the company to stay solvent. As early as January 1931, and continuing for several months thereafter, the firm was rumored to be trying to sell Corrigan, McKinney to Republic Steel.

Corrigan, McKinney stopped paying dividends in 1931. Cleveland-Cliffs took out a $3.5 million loan to pay dividends on Corrigan, McKinney stock for a while, (Note: Corrigan, McKinney Steel's earning/losses for the fiscal year ending April 30, 1931, and April 30, 1932, were not reported, but it lost nearly $1.5 million in the fiscal year ending April 30, 1933.) but Corrigan, McKinney stopped paying dividends after March 1932. This enabled preferred shareholders in McKinney Steel Holdings to vote their Corrigan, McKinney stock, and stripped voting privileges from all other Corrigan, McKinney shareholders. The Union Trust bank, which held 23,244 of the preferred shares in MSH, effectively controlled MSH. It ousted three MSH board members supported by Cleveland-Cliffs and installed three of its own: Joseph R. Kraus, chairman of Union Trust; Wilbert J. O'Neill, vice president of Union Trust; and Aims C. Coney, vice president of National City Bank and former vice president of Union-Cleveland Corp. (Union Trust's investment subsidiary). Greene and Mather were the only two board members re-elected.

Cleveland-Cliffs entered into negotiations to sell Corrigan, McKinney in May 1933, but these did not bear fruit.

Greene and Mather were re-elected to the board of McKinney Steel Holding in February 1934. Kraus, O'Neill, and Coney were replaced by John Watson, attorney with the firm M.B. and H.H. Johnson; Ernest N. Wagley, assistant vice president of Union Trust; and Harry F. Burmester, assistant conservator of Union Trust. (Note: The Union Trust Co. became insolvent on February 27, 1933, after it engaged in extensive and illegal investments in securities. The Union Trust's conservator, Oscar L. Cox, replaced Kraus, O'Neill, and Coney with individuals not involved in the bank's previous malfeasance.)

Corrigan, McKinney Steel again paid no dividends throughout the fiscal year ending April 1, 1934.

In July 1934, Cleveland-Cliffs entered into negotiations to sell Corrigan, McKinney Steel to Republic Steel — coal mines and all. Greene and William G. Mather worked with Tom Girdler of Republic Steel, with negotiations assisted by Crispin Oglebay. (Oglebay was head of Oglebay Norton, an ore mining and shipping company. He was also a director of both Corrigan, McKinney Steel and Republic Steel.) Under the terms of the deal, Corrigan, McKinney would be absorbed by Republic Steel and cease to exist.

To ensure the deal went through, in August 1934 the board of McKinney Steel Holdings ousted William G. Mather and installed Oscar L. Cox as president. On October 25, 1934, the preferred shareholders of McKinney Steel Holdings approved of the merger. The Department of Justice sued to stop the merger on antitrust grounds in February 1935, but a federal court ruled in favor of the merger in May 1935. (Note: By then, Corrigan, McKinney owed $1.305 million to preferred shareholders of MSH.)

Greene's background in finance made him well-equipped to handle Cleveland-Cliffs' debt. Greene characterized the short-term debt as "especially dangerous". By this time, the short-term notes had to be paid every three months. A bank could have called its loan at any time, jeopardizing Cleveland-Cliff's solvency. Immediately after the deal with Republic Steel was announced he sought to refinance the debt by selling bonds. The plan, announced in mid October, was to refinance three-quarters of its outstanding debt of $22.6 million through the sale of bonds. These five-year bonds, secured by mortgages on land, mines, and shipping vessels owned by Cleveland-Cliffs, carried an interest rate of 4.75 percent and would be marketed privately. The remainder of the debt would be paid by issuing a deed of trust against stocks and bonds owned by Cleveland-Cliffs. It, too, would carry an interest rate of 4.75 percent.

With the sale of Corrigan, McKinney to Republic Steel, McKinney Steel Holding no longer had any purpose. The first step in winding up the company would be to redeem all outstanding preferred shares. This would also help Cox liquidate the Union Trust by converting the shares it owned into cash. MSH's preferred shareholders approved a plan that would allow MSH to redeem 10,000 preferred shares a year by liquidating the Republic Steel securities held by MSH. (Note: As part of the purchase of Corrigan, McKinney, MSH had received Republic Steel 5.5 percent bonds worth $6.396 million, 13,437 shares of Republic Steel 6 percent preferred stock, and 335,937 share of Republic Steel common stock. Selling the bonds and preferred stock too quickly would drive down the price. If certain conditions for the price of these Republic Steel securities were met, another 10,000 preferred shares per year could be retired as well.) The Union Trust Co. negotiated a deal to sell its MSH preferred back to MSH at $127.50 per share. (That was the call price of $105 per preferred share, plus all dividends owed.)

Dissolution of McKinney Steel Holding would also allow Cleveland-Cliffs to take ownership of the 335,937 shares of Republic Steel common stock MSH held.

On November 1, a syndicate of eastern banks agreed to buy all of Republic Steel bonds and preferred stock held by MSH. This would allow MSH to retire 11,056 shares of MSH preferred by December 31, 1935. MSH president Oscar L. Cox also asked MSH preferred shareholders give the MSH board of directors the power to sell assets, retire the preferred stock in any amount, and shorten the time for stock redemption from 30 days to 10. Two weeks later, MSH preferred stockholders and Greene (voting the common shares) approved Cox's plan. Redemption of MSH preferred, due to occur on December 2, was moved up to November 19.

The day the MSH preferred stock was retired, Green won approval from the Cleveland-Cliffs board of director to sell $16.5 million in bonds and sign a $5 million deed of trust note to refinance the company's short-term debt. The company anticipated $500,000 a year in interest savings.

On November 19, Greene announced that McKinney Steel Holding would be dissolved. At the MSH board meeting on December 7, 1935, Oscar Cox stepped down as president, and Greene succeeded him. The other four directors resigned as well, and were replaced by Cleveland-Cliffs officers. McKinney Steel Holding was then dissolved. The $1.6 million in cash still held by MSH was transferred to Cleveland-Cliffs.

== Cleveland-Cliffs merger with Cliffs Corp. ==
Cleveland-Cliffs had stopped paying dividends on both common and preferred stock in 1932 due to the financial emergency caused by the Great Depression. Although the company's finances had dramatically improved since then, the board of directors declined to pay much in the way of dividends, preferring to pay down debt and spend profits on capital equipment expenditures. By December 31, 1945, Cleveland-Cliffs had an arrearage of $27.16 per preferred share or about $13.23 million. (Note: Cleveland-Cliffs had an arrearage of $23.50 on its preferred stock at the end of 1935. That fluctuated slightly over the next decade — $24.66 at the end of 1936, $23.16 at the end of 1937, $28.16 at the end of 1938, $30 at the end of 1939, $29.16 at the end of 1940, — but essentially remained fairly constant. A sinking fund was set up to pay the arrearage, but it was constantly delinquent.)

Cliffs Corp. derived a large portion of its income from holding Cleveland-Cliffs stock, so much so that it could not pay all the dividends owed on its own preferred stock.

The board of directors of Cliffs Corp., led by William G. Mather and Edward B. Greene, proposed dissolving Cliffs Corp. and selling its assets. The board would then distribute the cash to pay the arrearage on preferred dividends, which at that time amounted to $26.16 per preferred share. Preferred dividends would then be redeemed, and any cash left over would be distributed on a pro-rata basis to holders of Cliffs common stock.

=== Cutright's objections ===
Cliffs Corp. director Harold G. Cutright strongly objected to the proposal at a Cliffs Corp. board meeting held on December 18, 1946. Cutright was a vice president of Pittston Company, a coal mining firm located in West Virginia. Pittston was controlled by Alleghany Corporation, an investment firm which had been taken over by financier Robert R. Young in 1942. Cutright all but accused Mather and Green of mismanaging Cleveland-Cliffs. He pointed to a Cliffs Corp. valuation of the Cleveland-Cliffs stock of just $2 million, when it had previously been assessed at $40 million. (Note: In 1947, Cleveland-Cliffs had 487,238 shares of preferred and 408,296 shares of common stock. On December 18, 1947, preferred shares traded at $81-5/8 and common shares at $14-7/8 on the Cleveland Stock Exchange. The total market value of preferred shares was $39.7 million, and total market value of common shares was $6.0 million. Cliffs Corp. owned almost all Cleveland-Cliffs common stock.)

Cutright also accused Cliffs directors William G. Mather, Edward B. Greene, George B. Young, Alexander C. Brown, Philip R. Mather (William G. Mather's nephew), and George M. Gillies Jr. of having a conflict of interest, as they were all also directors of Cleveland-Cliffs. All the preferred stock issued by Cleveland-Cliffs was owned by directors and officers of Cleveland-Cliffs, while Cliffs Corp. common stock was held by individuals not associated with Cleveland-Cliffs. (Note: According to The New York Times, Cliffs Corp. preferred stock was held by William G. Mather, Edward B. Green, Samuel Livingston Mather III, Henry A. Raymond (retired managed of the Cleveland-Cliffs iron ore sales department), and George G. Wade (son of Jeptha Homer Wade II).) Cutright said the end purpose of the distribution of assets was to pay all dividends owed to these preferred shareholders and then redeem their stock.

Greene countered by saying Cutright's description of the facts were entirely inaccurate, but did admit that officers and directors of both companies had been working out how to pay dividends on Cleveland-Cliffs preferred stock for some time. (Note: As early as 1937, Greene told the press that it had been "constantly under consideration" for the past few years.)

Media outlets said Cutright's accusations were the opening salvo in a struggle between Robert B. Young on one side, and William G. Mather and Edward B. Greene on the other. (Note: News reports in December 1946 had claimed Cyrus Eaton had sided with Young as well, but this seems inaccurate as Eaton mediated between the two sides later.)

=== Board's action to dissolve Cliffs Corp. ===
Mather called an emergency meeting of the Cliffs Corp. board of directors for Monday, December 23.

At the emergency meeting, the board of directors of Cliffs Corp. voted to dissolve the corporation. The board's resolution proposed giving each shareholders of Cliffs Corp. two shares in Cleveland-Cliffs. William G. Mather then announced that a meeting of all Cliffs Corp. directors would be held Friday, December 27, to ratify the proposal. Cutright declared the attempt to dissolve Cliffs Corp. an effort to sidestep litigation over the loss of Cleveland-Cliffs' stock value.

At the meeting on December 27, Cliffs directors approved the plan, six to none. (Note: Two-thirds of the board of directors were needed to vote in favor of the plan in order for it to pass.) Cutright abstained, and the eighth board member, Cyrus Eaton, was not present. Greene said Cliffs Corp. management would come up with a plan for distribution of assets to shareholders, and that it would likely entail the pro-rata distribution of all Cliffs Corp. assets (which consisted of cash, stock in four steel companies, the common stock of Cleveland-Cliffs). No date was set for a stockholders meeting to approve of the plan, but on December 28, Mather and Greene sent proxy solicitations to Cliffs Corp. shareholders.

Cutright said Greene refused to divulge information that would allow the dissenters to evaluate the value of Cleveland-Cliffs common stock. As the December 27 meeting ended, Cutright formally demanded that he and those he spoke for be allowed to inspect all records of Cliffs Corps. and Cleveland-Cliffs. After the meeting, he initiated a lawsuit to stop the redemption of Cliffs Corp. preferred stock.

The day after the second emergency meeting, Wilbert J. O'Neill, the Cleveland attorney and former vice president of Union Trust who had served on the McKinney Steel Holding board of directors, formed a "protective committee" for the benefit of Cliffs Corp. preferred stockholders. (Note: A protective committee is a voluntary group formed by a class of holders of securities to ensure that their common interests are protected and advanced.)

On January 1, Greene said he was glad Cutright had aired his grievances.

Three days later, Cutright filed a lawsuit in a Cuyahoga County Court of Common Pleas to compel Cliffs Corp. and Cleveland-Cliffs to allow a full and complete examination of their financial records. Both companies, as well as Greene, were named in the action.

=== Resolution and merger ===
The Cliffs Corp. board of directors met again on Monday, January 13, 1947. Cutright again asked for a better valuation of Cleveland-Cliffs stock, and now demanded that an independent body make it. Apparently unrelated to this request, the Cleveland brokerage of Gottron, Russell & Co. issued its own analysis of the controversy. The brokerage advised Cliffs Corp. stockholders to approve the merger. It noted that the securities Cliffs Corp. held was equal to the value of Cliffs Corp. common stock (both about $23 million), and that cash on hand could give Cliffs Corp. shareholders a dividend of 25 to 50 cents a share.

On January 15, 1947, the Pittston Company filed suit to enjoin the dissolution. In a statement, Cutright said he did not oppose the dissolution, per se, but simply wanted a fair valuation of Cleveland-Cliffs preferred and common stock so that all stockholders would benefit from the wind-up. Greene responded to the lawsuit by saying Cutright merely wanted to discredit Cliffs Corp. and Cleveland-Cliffs. Cutright also claimed that Cliffs Corp. had had a $10 million offer for the Cleveland-Cliffs common stock, but had rejected it. Greene denied receiving any such offer. The following day, J.P. Routh, president and chairman of the Pittston Company, sent a telegram to Greene reaffirming Cutright's stand on the dissolution. Routh's communication said that the company believed a fair valuation could only be made if the stock were offered in a block at public auction, and he said Pittston would seek to buy the shares.

Negotiations between the two sides occurred throughout January and February 1947, mediated by Cyrus Eaton. Eaton's involvement was critical in bringing Greene and Mather to the table. They reached an agreement on February 19, 1947, under which Cliffs Corp. agreed to merge with Cleveland-Cliffs. The holders of the 805,734 shares of Cliffs Corp. common stock would receive 2.25 shares of Cleveland-Cliffs common stock. The holders of the 487,238 of Cliffs Corp. preferred stock would receive 1 share of Cleveland-Cliffs preferred and 1 share of Cleveland-Cliffs common stock in lieu of unpaid dividends.

To implement the agreement, Pittston Company sold all of its 34,500 shares of Cliffs Corp. common stock to Otis & Co. Cutright resigned from the Cliffs Corp. board, and was replaced by Robert W. Purcell, who had left the Cliffs Corp. board in 1945. (Note: Purcell was vice president of the legal department of the Chesapeake and Ohio Railway, which was also controlled by Alleghany Corporation.) Purcell voted with the rest of the board to suspend the plan to dissolve, and voted in favor of a new plan to merge Cliffs Corp. and Cleveland-Cliffs.

Pittston Company subsequently withdrew its lawsuit. (Note: The Pittston Company would later be renamed Alpha Natural Resources in 2002. Ironically, Cleveland-Cliffs purchased Alpha Natural Resources in 2008, renaming the joint company Cliffs Natural Resources. Cliffs Natural Resources renamed itself Cleveland-Cliffs Inc. in August 2017.)

Title to the Cliffs Corp. $25 million portfolio of steel company stock was transferred to Cleveland-Cliffs. (Note: Cleveland-Cliffs ended up owning 102,500 shares of Inland Steel (about three-eighths of that company's total shares), 100,500 shares of Youngstown Sheet & Tube (about one-eighth of that company's total shares), and 30,000 shares of Wheeling Steel (about one-twenty-third of that company's total shares). Cleveland-Cliffs also received 160,448 shares of Republic Steel to add to the 280,887 shares of Republic Steel which it already owned. This brought Cleveland-Cliffs' total ownership of Republic Steel stock to about 6 or 7 percent.)

On April 9, 1947, William G. Mather retired. The 89-year-old had fallen seriously ill in his office in early April, and resigned as chairman and a director of both Cleveland-Cliffs and Cliffs Corp. for reasons of health. Greene was elected chairman of Cleveland-Cliffs on April 25. Alexander C. Brown resigned his positions as a director and vice president of Cliffs Corp., and was elected a director of Cleveland-Cliffs. He was also elected president.

=== Shareholder lawsuit ===
In April 1947, a group of Cliffs Corp. preferred shareholders filed two lawsuits against the merging corporation. Stockholders involved included the Edna McConnell Clark Foundation, the Leatherstocking Corporation, New York City attorney William Rosenblatt, the Scriven Foundation, and Mary Imogene Bassett Hospital. The group began contacting other Cliffs Corp. stockholders to urge them to contact the U.S. Securities and Exchange Commission petition it to make an advisory report on the advisability of the merger. It also began soliciting proxies from 23 other shareholders of Cliffs Corp. preferred.

Cliffs Corp. stockholders were scheduled to consider management's merger on May 16, but the meeting was postponed and rescheduled for June 9. The meeting of Cleveland-Cliffs shareholders, set for May 20, was rescheduled to June 16.

On May 25, the Securities & Exchange Commission said it lacked the legal authority to issue an advisory report.

After a multi-day meeting, Cliffs Corp shareholders on June 13 voted 87.9 percent against a resolution liquidating Cliffs Corp. They then voted 67.9 percent in favor of the merger. Representatives of the Clark Foundation challenged the fairness of the merger plan, the right of management to vote their shares, and the right of tellers to receive votes for counting.

Cliffs Corp. offered to pay $22.75 for each share of its common stock. Dissenting Cliffs Corp. common shareholders demanded that they receive $43 for each of their shares.

The Cliffs/Cleveland-Cliffs merger was finalized on July 9, 1947.

The day the merger was complete, 61 holders of Cliffs Corp. preferred stock (representing 4,427 shares) filed suit in Cuyahoga County Common Pleas Court, arguing the merger was illegal. They asked the court to reverse the merger, and for Cliffs to pay them $128.66 a share (value plus dividends and interest) to redeem their shares.

On October 1, 1947, two more lawsuits were filed against Cliffs Corp. in Cuyahoga County. One group, led by the Clark Foundation, represented 86 Cliffs Corp. preferred stockholders owning 43,182 shares. The second group, led by businessman Robert Congdon of Duluth, Minnesota, represented 161 Cliffs Corp. common stockholders owning 23,039 shares. (Note: In December 1947, 84 more preferred shareholders (representing 2,652 shares) joined the preferred shareholder group's lawsuit. Five more common shareholders (representing 383 shares) joined the common shareholder group's lawsuit. The Clark Foundation was also a member of the common shareholders group.) The preferred shareholder group demanded that Cliffs Corp. pay them $128.66 per share, while the common shareholders wanted $43 per share, for a total payout of $4.8 million. Both lawsuits demanded that Cliffs Corp. stock be appraised.

Cliffs Corp. settled the common shareholder group's lawsuit out of court in June 1948, paying $39 a share.

Regarding the illegality of the merger, Cuyahoga County Common Pleas Judge Charles J. McNamee ruled in favor of Cliffs Corp. on June 10, 1948. An Ohio court of appeals upheld the Judge McNamee's ruling in April 1949, and the Ohio Supreme Court declined to hear an appeal in June.

In the preferred shareholder group's valuation lawsuit, McNamee ruled the same day that an appraisal should be made. An appraisal was needed, the court held, because Ohio law said market value was not the deciding factor in stock valuation. Additionally, Cliffs Corp. and the plaintiffs in the suit disagreed sharply over the value of mines, railroads, freights, hydro-electric power plants, and various real estate, timber, and other lands owned by Cleveland-Cliffs. Three appraisers were appointed.

In their report, presented to the court on March 9, 1949, the appraisers valued Cliffs Corp. preferred stock at $112 per share. McNamee approved the appraisers' report. After the plaintiffs and defendants agreed to accept McNamee's ruling, (Note: Cliffs Corp. and Cleveland-Cliffs had initially asked McNamee to reject the appraisers' report.) Cliffs Corp. (and its successor) was ordered to pay $3.2 million to the preferred shareholders who participated in the lawsuit. That included $200,000 in interest.

== Retirement ==
Edward B. Greene resigned as chairman of the executive committee of Cleveland Trust on December 28, 1939, on account of poor health. He remained a director of the bank, and continued to serve on its discount committee.

The 73-year-old Greene retired as chairman of Cleveland-Cliffs on June 21, 1952. His successor was Alexander C. Brown. Greene continued to act as honorary chairman, presiding at board meetings and advising Brown.

== Other corporate roles ==
As was typical for the time, Edward Greene served on the board of directors of a wide range of companies. These included Eaton Axle & Spring, Guarantee Title & Trust, Ohio Chemical & Manufacturing Co., Osborn Manufacturing, Sandusky Cement, Trumbull Steel, Wade Realty, and The Williamson Company. At times, he also served on the boards of Eaton Manufacturing Co., Goodyear Tire & Rubber, Harshaw Chemical Co., Jones & Laughlin Steel, Medusa Portland Cement, Montreal Mining Co., and the Reserve Mining Co. He also served for a time as vice president of Cliffs Dow Chemical Corporation.

Greene was also a director of several railroads, including the New York Central Railroad, the New York and Harlem Railroad, the West Shore Railroad, the Cleveland, Cincinnati, Chicago and St. Louis Railway, the Michigan Central Railroad, and the Lake Superior and Ishpeming Railroad. He also was a director of the Cleveland Union Terminal Co., which built the Cleveland Union Terminal, a downtown Cleveland landmark.

As head of a major Great Lakes shipping company, Greene also served on the board of directors of the Lake Carriers Association, the trade association for major Lake freighter companies. He also served on the board of the Lake Superior Ore Association, a trade association of mine owners. He was considered an expert on the history of iron ore and the Cleveland metals industry.

As a banker, Green was appointed to the Banking Advisory Committee, an Ohio state government emergency committee set up in May 1933 to advise the governor and legislature on banking issues. He served on its successor body, the State Banking Advisory Board, which issued major recommendations to modernize Ohio's banking laws in October 1934. He also co-founded the Cleveland chapter of the American Institute of Banking.

During the Great Depression, Greene served on the board of the National Credit Corporation, a U.S. government agency which operated in 1931 and 1932 to stem the tide of bank failures. When it was replaced in 1933 with the Reconstruction Finance Corporation, Greene served on that board as well. During much of the depression, Greene also was a member of the advisory loan committee of the Federal Reserve Bank of Cleveland.

Locally, Greene was president of the Cleveland Chamber of Commerce in 1924 and again in 1940. He received its medal for public service in 1940.

During World War II, Green was director of military relief of the Lake Division of the American Red Cross. He was also on the board of directors, and a member of the executive committee, of the Military Training Camps Association, a U.S. government authorized but privately run summertime military training program.

Greene served at various times as a trustee of the Cleveland Museum of Art, Cleveland Community Fund, University Hospitals, and the Welfare Federation. From 1925 to 1947, he served as a trustee of Yale University. During that time, he also served as chairman of the Yale alumni advisory board, and as chairman of its committee on honorary degrees. He was also a trustee of the Cleveland Institute of Art, Playhouse Foundation, and the John Huntington Art and Polytechnic Institute (precursor to the Cleveland Museum of Art).

== Personal life and death ==
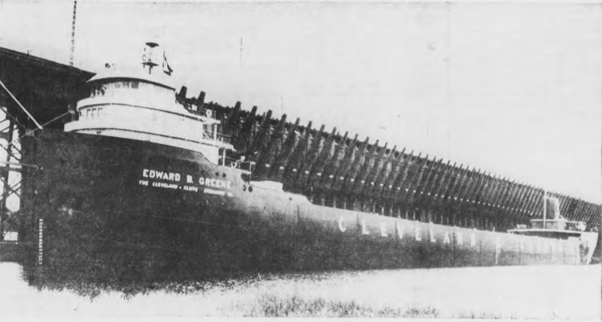
The MV Edward B. Greene on its maiden voyage in 1952.

Edward B. Greene received an honorary master's degree from Yale University in 1925, and an honorary Ph.D. from Western Reserve University in 1946.

Greene married Helen Wade, daughter of Cleveland industrialist Jeptha Homer Wade II, on November 18, 1909.

During the last years of his life, Greene suffered from poor health. He was confined to his home in the months before his death. He died at his home on October 10, 1957. His Episcopal funeral was held at Wade Memorial Chapel at Lake View Cemetery in Cleveland. Rev. Beverley Dandridge Tucker Jr., bishop of the Episcopal Diocese of Ohio, presided. Green was then buried at Lake View Cemetery.

== Legacy ==
Greene was an art collector. He donated 100 ivory and porcelain miniature portraits to the Cleveland Museum of Art, which subsequently named a wing of the museum after him.

The Lake freighter MV Edward B. Greene was named for him. It was christened the day he retired in 1952, and for many years was the flagship of the Cleveland-Cliffs fleet.

== Bibliography ==
- Committee on Banking and Currency (1934). Hearings before the Committee on Banking and Currency on S.Res. 84 and S.Res 56 and S.Res 97. Part 18: Reports on Cleveland Banking Investigation, May 3 and 4, 1934. U.S. Senate. 73d Cong., 2d sess. Washington, D.C.: Government Printing Office.
- Gleisser, Marcus (2005). The World of Cyrus Eaton. Kent, Ohio: Kent State University Press. ISBN 9780873388399.
- Ingham, John N. (1983). Biographical Dictionary of American Business Leaders. Volume A-G. Westport, Conn.: Greenwood Press. ISBN 9780313239076.
- Reutter, Mark (2004). Making Steel: Sparrows Point and the Rise and Ruin of American Industrial Might. Urbana, Ill.: University of Illinois Press. ISBN 9780252072338.
- Reynolds, Terry S.; Dawson, Virginia P. (2011). Iron Will: Cleveland-Cliffs and the Mining of Iron Ore, 1847-2006. Detroit: Wayne State University Press. ISBN 9780814336434.
- Subcommittee of the Committee on Education and Labor (1939). Violations of Free Speech and Rights of Labor. Part 33: "Little Steel". Committee on Education and Labor. U.S. Senate. 75th Cong., 3d sess. Washington, D.C.: Government Printing Office. hdl:2027/uc1.$b643163.
- Temporary National Economic Committee (1940). Verbatim Record of the Proceedings of the Temporary National Economic Committee. Vol. 9: October 26, 1939 to December 8, 1939. U.S. Congress. 76th Cong., 2d sess. Washington, D.C.: The Bureau of National Affairs. OCLC 330795.
