= Flora Stone Mather =

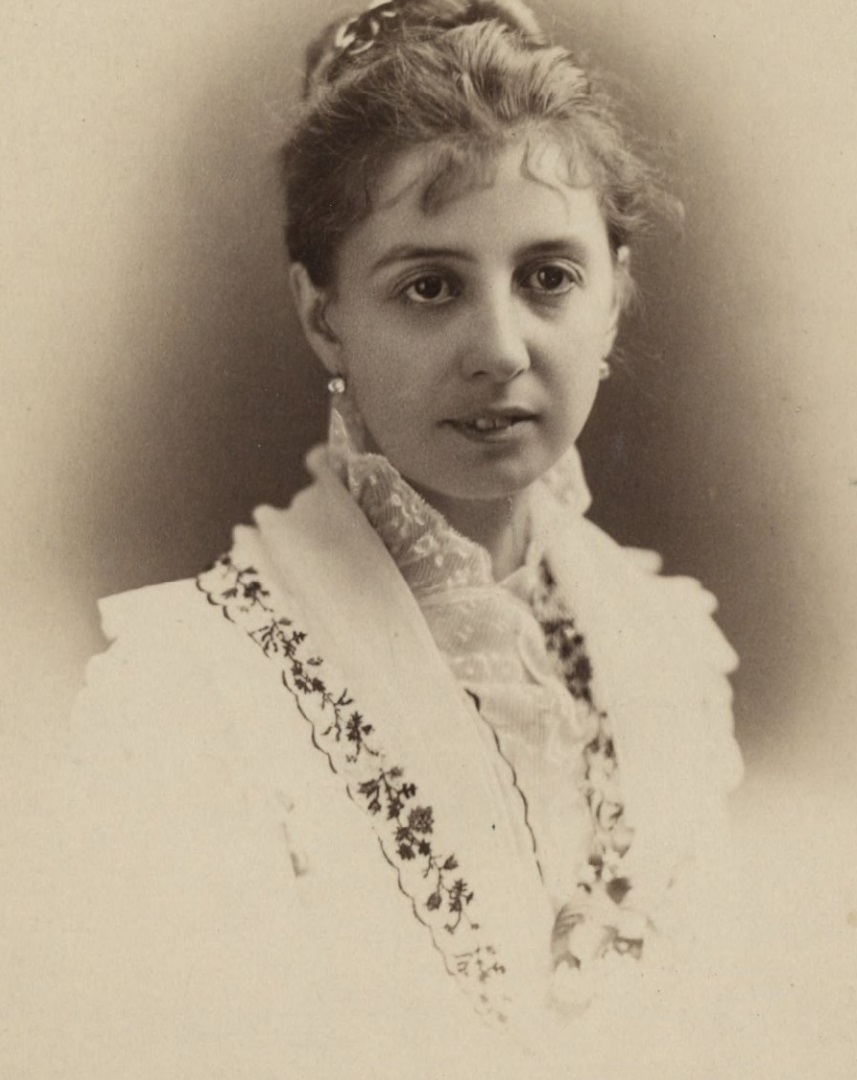
- Mather, circa 1870 to 1890
- Born: April 8, 1852; Cleveland, Ohio, US
- Died: January 19, 1909 (aged 56); Bratenahl, Ohio, US
- Education: Cleveland Academy
- Occupations: Philanthropist, social welfare advocate
- Known for: Support of religious, social welfare and educational institutions
- Spouse: Samuel Livingston Mather II
- Children: 4
- Relatives: Amasa Stone (father); Helen Hay Whitney (niece)

Flora Stone Mather (April 8, 1852 – January 19, 1909) was a prominent philanthropist and advocate supporting religious, social welfare, and educational institutions in Cleveland, Ohio. Her leadership and generosity, directed toward promoting the education of women, led to Western Reserve University's College for Women being renamed in 1931 as the Flora Stone Mather College for Women.

== Early life ==
Flora Amelia Stone was born on April 8, 1852, in Cleveland, Ohio. Her father was Amasa Stone and her mother was Julia Gleason Stone. Amasa Stone was a wealthy banker and builder of railroads and bridges. She had two siblings, a brother, Adelbert Barnes Stone (1844–1865), a geology student at Yale University, who died while swimming in the Connecticut River, and a sister, Clara Stone Hay (1849–1914).

Flora Stone graduated from the Cleveland Academy in 1875. In spite of her family's privileged position and interest in assuring her brother's elite college education, she did not attend college. There was not a value placed on post-secondary education for the two Stone daughters. In 1881 Flora married Samuel Livingston Mather II, a wealthy businessman with shipping and mining interests in the Great Lakes region. The couple had four children: Samuel Livingston Mather III (1882), Amasa Stone (1884), Constance (1889) and Philip Richard (1894).

== Philanthropy and social welfare advocacy ==
Flora Stone Mather's philanthropy and devotion to civic causes were rooted in the experience of her family's strong Christian faith and their very active membership in the city's Old Stone Church. Notable Cleveland social welfare institutions that were beneficiaries of her financial gifts include two settlement houses, Goodrich House and Hiram House, the Legal Aid Society of Cleveland, Consumers League of Ohio and the Cleveland Day Nursery and Kindergarten Association. Her engagement with these organizations often went well beyond financial support, involving her in direct service and advocacy for broader charitable investment in the work. Much of her philanthropy was directed to educational institutions like Adelbert College, Western Reserve University's College for Women, Hathaway Brown School and Lakeside Hospital School of Nursing, which was named in her honor. Her sister, Clara Stone Hay, was married to the wealthy statesman John Hay. Together, Flora and Clara continued their parents’ tradition of civic generosity, earning their own recognition as prominent philanthropists.

== Legacy at Case Western Reserve University ==
Flora Mather's most enduring philanthropic legacy is woven deeply into Case Western Reserve University's past and present. Her family was among the university's earliest benefactors. Amasa Stone, her father, was instrumental in moving Western Reserve College from Hudson, Ohio to Cleveland in 1882. In that year he made a substantial donation to the college and its undergraduate division was renamed 'Adelbert College' in honor of his son. Amasa Stone died the following year, but his support for the college was continued by his daughters and sons-in-law.

=== Flora Stone Mather College for Women ===
In 1892 Flora Mather donated generously to a fledgling effort to reestablish coeducation at Western Reserve College. The uproar over the college's controversial decision to end the admission of women led to the creation of a small separate women's division, initially known as the College for Women. Flora's sister and brother-in-law became the new college's first significant benefactors. Flora soon became a source of continuing support for the college. Her generosity and enthusiastic engagement in the life of the school was recognized as so crucial to reestablishing coeducation in the city's leading educational institution, that in 1931 the college was renamed in her honor as the Flora Stone Mather College for Women. Eventually, the women's college was fully integrated into the rapidly growing Western Reserve University.

=== Flora Stone Mather Quadrangle ===
The Flora Stone Mather Quadrangle, known to students as the Mather Quad, is the heart of Case Western Reserve University's campus. It is the location of the Kelvin Smith Library, Thwing Student Center, School of Law, Mandel School of Applied Social Sciences, Weatherhead School of Management and many departments of the College of Arts and Sciences. Scattered around the campus are buildings funded by the Stone, Mather and Hay families, some still bearing the Mather name in dedication to Flora Stone Mather. The university's Amasa Stone Chapel was given in memory of their father by Flora Mather and Cora Hay. A portion of the campus has been designated as the Flora Stone Mather College Historic District.

Flora Stone Mather died on January 19, 1909, at ‘Shoreby’, the family's home on the Lake Erie shore in Bratenahl near downtown Cleveland. She is buried along with other family members in Lake View Cemetery in Cleveland.
