= Samuel Livingston Mather =

American mining and steel manufactuing executive, and philanthropist

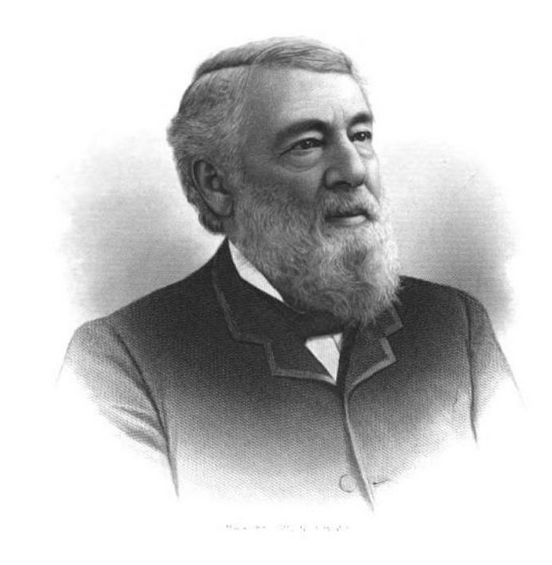
- Samuel Livingston Mather about 1890
- Born: July 1, 1817; Middletown, Connecticut, U.S.
- Died: October 8, 1890 (aged 73); Cleveland, Ohio, U.S.
- Occupation: Businessman
- Known for: Iron mining, banking
- Relatives: Samuel Livingston Mather II (son); William G. Mather (son)

Samuel Livingston Mather (July 1, 1817 – October 8, 1890) was an American who pioneered iron mining in the Lake Superior iron mining district. He was the first person to transport iron ore from the region to Lake Erie. He co-founded the Cleveland Iron Mining Company (now known as Cleveland-Cliffs), which became one of the most dominant iron mining companies in the United States.

== Early life ==
Samuel Livingston Mather was born July 1, 1817, to Samuel and Catherine (née Livingston) Mather in Middletown, Connecticut.

He was descended from Richard Mather, a prominent New England Puritan minister in colonial Boston. Richard's third son, Increase Mather, was the sixth president of Harvard College. Increase's son, Cotton Mather, played a prominent role in the Salem witch trials of 1692–1693. Samuel Livingston Mather, however, traced his lineage back to Richard Mather's fourth son, Timothy, one of the co-founders of Yale University. His grandfather, Samuel Mather, was a member of the Connecticut Land Company and a founder of the city of Cleveland, Ohio.

At the age of 16, he graduated from Wesleyan University in 1835, then worked for a time for his father in Middletown. He then relocated to New York City, where he worked as an importer and exporter, selling goods on commission. Between 1835 and 1843, he twice traveled to Spain — an "unusual journey" for any American in the early 1800s. However, this business was not very profitable.

== Cleveland Iron Mining Co. ==
=== Formation ===
In 1843, Mather moved to Cleveland to look after the family lands. In doing so, he became the only descendant of an original stockholder in the Connecticut Land Company to have an influence in the new city. He studied law under local attorney John W. Allen. He was subsequently admitted to the bar, but never practiced law. Instead, he acted as a land agent for other absentee landowners in the Connecticut Land Company. He struggled financially, and became depressed over his prospects.

Copper and iron deposit outcroppings were discovered on Upper Peninsula of Michigan in September 1844. News spread quickly, and Samuel L. Mather was deeply interested in the reports. In 1845 W.A. Adair, George E. Freeman, and Morgan L. Hewitt of Cleveland formed the Dead River & Ohio Mining Company. (Note: The name of the company is also sometimes given by various authors as the Dead River Silver and Copper Mining Co., but as Reynolds and Dawson point out no original documents support this name.) The company hired Dr. J. Lang Cassels, a chemist and medical botanist and one of Ohio's most prominent scientists at the time, to investigate. Cassels arrived in Michigan in 1846. On land which is now part of the city of Marquette, he discovered large near-surface deposits of iron ore. (Note: Cassels was guided to the spot by a Native American, who took him there in a birch bark canoe.) Cassels claimed squatter's right to 3,000 acres (1,200 ha) of land and returned to Cleveland in 1847.

On November 9, 1847, Adair and 10 others formed the Cleveland Iron Mining Co. Two weeks later, Samuel L. Mather joined the group as a full partner. Shares in the company were first issued on November 27, 1847. While the company organized, John Mann and Samuel Moody usurped part of the land (which later became known as the Cleveland Mine), while Dr. Edward Rogers usurped title to another portion (which later became known as the Lake Superior Mine). The Marquette Iron Mining Company then leased the Mann-Moody and Rogers property. (Note: The Marquette Iron Mining Company was organized in 1848 by Edward B. Clark, Robert B. Graveraet, and two investors.) In 1849, the three groups fought over the title until the federal government ruled in favor of Cleveland Iron Mining's title to the Cleveland Mine. (Note: The Cleveland Iron Mining claim failed to cover the Lake Superior property.) To help secure its claim during that year, the company erected log houses for miners and a log barn for horses.

In 1850, the Cleveland Iron Mining Co. obtained a special corporate charter from the Michigan State Legislature. In addition to Samuel L. Mather, the incorporators included John W. Allen, Aaron Barker, Henry F. Brayton, E.M. Clark, Morgan L. Hewitt, John Outhwaite, and Benjamin Strickland. (Note: Newett omits Allen, Barker, and Strickland and includes Isaac L. Hewitt and Selah Chamberlain.)

The company did little except maintain its claim to the land. Outhwaite visited the site and planted potatoes there as proof the land was being "improved", as required by federal law. In the winter of 1849-1850, the firm managed to send 20 wagons, each hauling huge boulders of iron ore, to the lake shore. In November 1851, Cleveland Iron Mining signed a contract with Herman B. Ely of the Iron Mountain Railroad to build a spur to the company's land.

=== Expansion ===
In 1853, Cleveland Iron Mining Co. purchased the land and assets of the Marquette Iron Mining Co., whose primary investor was Waterman Fisher. (Note: Marquette Iron Company consisted of Waterman A. fisher, Edward Clarke, Amos R. Harlow, and Robert J. Graveraet. Clarke died in 1849, and Graveraet withdrew in 1852.) Fisher was likely dismayed that Ely was building a line toward the Cleveland company's land, and decided to sell.

On March 29, 1853, Samuel L. Mather, Henry F. Brayton, Selah Chamberlain, E.M. Clark, Isaac L. Hewitt, Morgan L. Hewitt, and John Outhwaite reorganized the merged company and incorporated it as the Cleveland Iron Mining Co. name under the regular laws of Michigan. (Note: Ehle and Ellis also include William J. Gordon.) Morgan Hewitt was named president, and Mather the secretary and treasurer. (Note: Mather was also a director of the firm.) It was capitalized at $500,000 (equivalent to $14,832,000 in 2024). The key investors were Mather, chemist Outhwaite, physician Morgan Hewitt, and Chamberlain. Chamberlain and Hewitt were good friends of Mather's, and Chamberlain lived next door to him. Mather often gathered Chamberlain, Hewitt, Outhwaite, and others in his garden, where they talked science, and it was Mather who got them interested in mining Lake Superior iron ore.

The Cleveland Iron Mining Co. became the second mining firm, after the pioneering Jackson Iron Co., to risk mining on the Upper Peninsula. It hauled the iron ore via horse-drawn wagon to the mouth of the Carp River, and had it turned into pig iron at local forges. In the early summer of 1853, it shipped 150 short tons (140 t) of pig iron to Cleveland and Sharon, Pennsylvania, followed by 35 short tons (32 t) in late August to Cleveland. It was the first company to transport iron ore or pig iron out of the Lake Superior district in any large amount. (Note: The Jackson Iron Mining Co. had shipped a few tons to Sharon, Pennsylvania, in 1852, and a few tons to the 1853 World's Fair in New York City in 1853, but these were relatively small amounts of ore, shipped in barrels, and used for testing or display.)

By 1854, Waterman Fisher had sold his interest in the Cleveland Iron Mining Co. to Morgan Hewitt, Samuel L. Mather, William J. Gordon, and others of Cleveland. These men now controlled the firm outright. Mather, micromanaging the company's operations from Cleveland, ordered the construction of an office building at the mine and a company store in the emerging town of Marquette. With Ely's railroad stalled, Mather signed an agreement with the Jackson Iron Co. in which the two firms agreed to jointly build a plank road from their mines to Marquette.

The company mined 4,000 short tons (3,600 t) of iron ore in 1854. It mined another 1,449 short tons (1,315 t) in 1955. In 1856, the Cleveland Iron Mining Co. became the first company to ship iron ore to Lake Erie in raw form, transporting 269 short tons (244 t) of ore on the steamer Ontonagon. (Note: The Marquette Iron Co. had been the first mining firm to ship iron ore to Cleveland in 1853, but it did so in barrels.) By linking Cleveland to the Lake Superior Iron District, Mather, perhaps more than anyone, ensured that Cleveland would grow into an industrial powerhouse.

=== Profitability ===
Mather was the steadying hand behind the Cleveland Iron Mining Co. When setbacks occurred, other investors wanted to shut it down or pull out, but Mather convinced them to invest additional money to push past the obstacles. When the Panic of 1857 began in late August of that year, many of Cleveland Iron Mining's customers defaulted on their payment and drastically reduced their orders. In the late fall, Mather personally went to New York City to find investors or banks willing to loan the company $50,000, but no one was willing to do so. The company had to use its money to pay off loans rather than pay workers. Mather printed scrip to pay the miners, backed by his own fortune. His reputation was so solid, the scrip did not devalue.

With the effects of the panic largely gone by 1859, Cleveland Iron Mining became profitable again. It paid its first dividend — $1.40 a share — in 1862. A dividend of $10 a share was paid in 1864. Whereas the first investors had paid $14 a share, shares were selling for $30 in 1863 and $84 a share in 1864.

With the firm now one of the largest iron mining companies in the United States, Mather convinced the other investors in the Cleveland Iron Mining Co. to expand into the manufacture of iron blooms. In 1864, a new Marquette Iron Company was formed as a subsidiary of Cleveland Iron Mining to undertake blooming. To obtain the capital needed for the new company, Mather sold 250 acres (100 ha) of land and 150 feet (46 m) of Marquette lakefront, raising $100,000. The subsidiary, with Mather as president, leased the bloomeries and forges of the Collins Iron Co. while using Cleveland Iron Mining ore.

Mather's primary responsibility since 1847 had been to get ore from Michigan to Ohio. This meant chartering ships, and coordinating the delivery of ore between the mine and the docks. He now convinced the other investors that Cleveland Iron Mining should try to cut costs by transporting ore itself. To this end, the company purchased a half-interest in the bark George Sherman in 1866. In 1867, Mather gave up on micromanaging affairs from Cleveland.

=== Presidency of Cleveland Iron Mining through two depressions ===
In 1869, Samuel L. Mather was elected president of the Cleveland Iron Mining Co., after Dr. Hewitt retired. He served as president until his death in 1890. Three years later, he formed a new subsidiary, the Cleveland Transportation Company, to build and operate vessels on the mining company's behalf. By 1872, Cleveland Iron Mining was the fifth largest iron ore producer in the nation.

When the Panic of 1873 hit in late September of that year, Cleveland Iron Mining Co. once more faced a severe financial crisis. Mather literally ran out of money. In October, he told his staff to stop payment on animal feed, blasting chemicals, and coal. Only workers should be paid, to keep the ore flow moving. He wrote to a business agent in Michigan on October 25, "I tell you it is fearful ... I am nearly worn out with care & anxiety".

Producers of the new Bessemer process steel needed iron ore low in phosphorus. Mather found no demand for low-phosphorus iron ore in 1871, but by 1875 many customers were telling him that if they could not get low-phosphorus ore they were rather not make steel at all. Mather found it increasingly difficult to sell Cleveland Iron Mining's high-phosphorus iron. At the same time, most of the near-surface deposits Cleveland Iron Mining had been digging were exhausted, forcing the company to undertake far more expensive underground mining. Mather worked hard to keep costs low by focusing systemically on cost reduction, embracing new mining methods and technology, and trying to locate low-phosphorus sources of ore.

Making matters worse, the Menominee Range opened in 1877. Iron ore there lay close to the surface, making it cheaper to mine. The region had a milder climate than the Marquette Range, was closer to consumers (which lowered transportation costs), and had a longer shipping season (since it used the port of Escanaba, Michigan, rather than Marquette). A flood of inexpensive Menominee ore drove prices down even further. Mather closed the company store in Marquette. He allowed outsiders to explore Cleveland Iron's 50,000-acre (20,000 ha) estate in Michigan for ore, hoping for a discovery that would at least give the company royalties if nothing else. No strike was made.

The Cleveland Transportation Company was dragging the company under. Nearly bankrupt, Mather sold the company's interest in Cleveland Transportation in 1877.

=== Managerial excellence ===
By early 1880s, Samuel L. Mather was known nationwide as being the best iron mining manager in Lake Superior region. His focus on cost reduction had created a highly effective internal accounting system. Charles D. Lawson, state commissioner of mineral statistics in Michigan, lauded Cleveland Iron Mining for it, noting that the company had complete sense of costs and operations.

By the early 1880s, Mather's health had begun to fail because of stress. He faced another pricing crisis in 1885, when the Gogebic and Vermilion iron ranges opened, further flooding the market with ore. Gogebic ore was particularly low in phosphorus. As the decade wore on, Mather's health worsened, and he developed rheumatism and started losing his sight. His health was so bad that he stopped going to Michigan after 1886, and his son, William G. Mather, had to take over transportation duties.

Mather made two important decisions regarding the company in the years before his death. William G. Mather discovered that Republic Iron & Steel was making money shipping ore. In 1888, Samuel Mather decided to get back into the shipping business, and in September 1888 signed contracts to have two steamers built. This made the firm the first iron mining company in the United States to own its own transport fleet. The first vessel, the Frontenac, launched in March 1889. The second, the Pontiac, launched in July 1889.

=== Acquisition of Iron Cliffs ===
Mather's other important decision was to buy out the Iron Cliffs Mining Company. Mather had begun to worry in the early 1880s that his company would soon exhaust its iron ore reserves. Mather ordered an intensive exploration program begun in 1886, even at the expense of dividends. He pushed the board of directors to buy new properties, and told his land agents to keep an eye out of anything of value which the company might purchase or lease. By 1889, Mather was seriously concerned that Cleveland Iron had become a second-class firm. Its high-phosphorus ore sold only slowly, and at lower and lower prices. Iron Cliffs, however, had just want Cleveland Iron Mining needed: Proven reserves, lots of land, and low-phosphorus ore.

Samuel J. Tilden, the former governor of New York and presidential candidate, led the Iron Cliffs Company. When he died in August 1886, Mather began investigating how to obtain control of the now-leaderless Iron Cliffs. Mather traveled to New York City to see if the Tilden estate was interested in selling, but it was not, and the surviving big stockholder, William Barnum, was adamantly opposed to a buyout.

Barnum died in late April 1889 after a five-month illness, and the Iron Cliffs board appointed a committee to seek a buyer. Mather seized the opportunity. He asked Jeptha Wade, a co-founder of Western Union and a Cleveland Iron Mining director since 1867, to head a syndicate of investors to acquire Iron Cliffs on behalf of Cleveland Iron Mining. In addition to Wade and Mather, the syndicate included William G. Mather, Selah Chamberlain, and other Cleveland Iron Mining directors. By February 1890, the syndicate owned 14,000 of Iron Cliffs's 20,000 shares. The syndicate took control of Iron Cliffs and its 55,000 acres (22,000 ha) of iron-bearing land in April 1890. The name of the merged company was changed to Cleveland-Cliffs Iron Co.

=== Other roles ===
He was secretary and manager of the Marquette Iron Company (founded in 1850), president of the Cleveland Boiler Plate Company (founded in 1858), and president of the American Iron Mining Company (founded in 1864). All were subsidiaries of the Cleveland Iron Mining Company.

== Other interests ==
Along with six others, Mather co-founded the Merchants' National Bank of Cleveland in February 1865. In 1872, Mather, Outhwaite, and Fred A. Morse organized the Cleveland Transportation Co. It had three steamers and three barge consorts.

Mather also held investments in three other small Michigan iron mining firms. He was a director of the Bancroft Iron Company and president of the McComber Iron Company. In 1887, he co-founded and was a director of the Michigan Gold Company, which mined gold from Jasper Knob near the city of Ishpeming.

Beginning in 1880, Mather was an investor in and director of the New York, Pennsylvania and Ohio Railroad (Nypano), and served until his death.

== Personal life ==
Samuel L. Mather was a lifelong Episcopalian, and one of the denomination's leading laymen in Ohio. Politically, he was a Republican.

He married Georgiana Pomeroy Woolson, grand-daughter of James Fenimore Cooper and sister of Constance Fenimore Woolson, on September 24, 1850. The couple had two children: Samuel Livingston II and Katherine. She died on November 2, 1853. He then married Elizabeth Gwinn on June 11, 1856. They had one child, William Gwinn.

In 1870, Mather was honored by shipping businessman Philip Minch, who named his newly-built 538-short-ton (488 t) schooner the Samuel L. Mather. The vessel was 162 feet (49 m) long, had a beam of 32 feet (9.8 m), and drew 14 feet (4.3 m).

About September 24, 1890, Samuel L. Mather left work feeling ill. Severe chills developed. He died at his home from inflammation of the lungs on October 8. His funeral was held at Trinity Cathedral in Cleveland, and he was buried at Lake View Cemetery. He left an estate work $375,000 (equivalent to $11,913,000 in 2024).

== Bibliography ==
- Avery, Elroy McKendree (1918). A History of Cleveland and Its Environs: The Heart of New Connecticut. Volume III. Chicago: Lewis Publishing Co.
- Brooks, T.B. (1873). "Part 1: Iron Bearing Rocks (Economic)". In Brooks, T.B. (ed.). Geological Survey of Michigan: Upper Peninsula 1869-1873. Vol. 1. New York: Julius Bien. OCLC 11704361.
- Ehle, Jay C.; Ellis, William D. (1996). Cleveland's Harbor: The Cleveland-Cuyahoga County Port Authority. Kent, Ohio: Kent State University Press. ISBN 9780873385435.
- Kennedy, James Harrison (1896). A History of the City of Cleveland: Its Settlement, Rise and Progress, 1796-1896. Cleveland: Imperial Press.
- Newett, George (1899). Department of Mineral Statistics: Mines and Mineral Statistics. Ishpeming, Mich.: Presses of Iron Ore Printing House. OCLC 19913119.
- Orth, Samuel Peter (1910). A History of Cleveland, Ohio. Volume II: Biography. Chicago: S.J. Clarke Publishing Co.
- Reynolds, Terry S.; Dawson, Virginia P. (2011). Iron Will: Cleveland Cliffs and the Mining of Iron Ore, 1847-2006. Detroit: Wayne State University Press. ISBN 9780814335116.
- Smart, George (September 7, 1916). "Cleveland - Home of Many Industries". The Iron Trade Review. pp. 57–63, 70.
