= Samuel Livingston Mather III =

American mining and steel manufactuing executive, and philanthropist

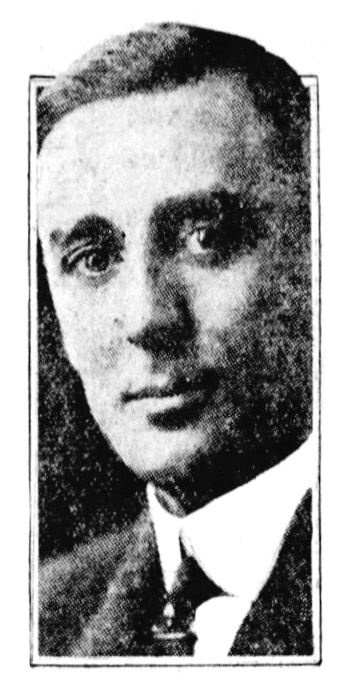
- S. Livingston Mather III in 1930
- Born: August 22, 1882; Cleveland, Ohio, U.S.
- Died: September 11, 1960 (aged 78); Cleveland, Ohio, U.S.
- Occupation: Businessman
- Known for: Shipping, iron mining
- Parents: Samuel Livingston Mather II (father); Flora Stone Mather (mother)
- Relatives: William G. Mather (uncle)

Samuel Livingston Mather III (August 22, 1882 – September 11, 1960), frequently referred to during his life as S. Livingston Mather, was an American industrialist and philanthropist from Cleveland, Ohio. He worked for the company his great-grandfather had co-founded, Cleveland-Cliffs for his entire life. A conservationist, he donated two parks during his lifetime. He also supported higher education, particularly what is now known as Case Western Reserve University.

== Early life and family ==
Samuel Livingston Mather III was born in Cleveland, Ohio, in the United States on August 22, 1882, to Samuel Livingston Mather II and his wife, Flora (née Stone). He had three younger siblings: Amasa, Constance, and Philip.

He was descended from Richard Mather, a prominent New England Puritan minister in colonial Boston. Richard's third son, Increase Mather, was the sixth president of Harvard College. Increase's son, Cotton Mather, played a prominent role in the Salem witch trials of 1692–1693. Samuel Livingston Mather III, however, traced his lineage back to Richard Mather's fourth son, Timothy, one of the co-founders of Yale University. His paternal great-great-grandfather, Samuel Mather, was a member of the Connecticut Land Company and a founder of the city of Cleveland, Ohio. His pateral grandfather, Samuel Livingston Mather, emigrated to Cleveland in 1843 to look after the family lands. He founded the Cleveland Iron Mining Co. and the Merchants National Bank of Cleveland. His father, Samuel Livingston Mather II, co-founded the influential shipping firm of Pickands Mather, and was a director of Cleveland-Cliffs Iron Mining Co. (formerly Cleveland Iron Mining Co.), Interlake Steamship Company, and the American Ship Building Company.

His maternal grandfather was Amasa Stone, who helped build the Cleveland, Columbus and Cincinnati Railroad and the Cleveland, Painesville and Ashtabula Railroad. He also helped bankroll John D. Rockefeller's Standard Oil and later served as a director of the company. His mother, Flora Stone Mather, was a prominent donor to Western Reserve College (now Case Western Reserve University).

== Education and career ==
He attended University School in Cleveland, and graduated from Yale University in 1905. He was a member of the Yale swim team, and a member of the Psi Upsilon fraternity.

In October 1905, Mather went to work in the iron mining department of the Cleveland-Cliff Iron Co. at Ishpeming, Michigan. After marrying, Mather moved to Cleveland-Cliffs's main office in Cleveland, Ohio, in December 1907. He was elected assistant secretary of the company in 1908, secretary in June 1914, and vice president in charge of operations in 1926. He retired from the company on October 1, 1947.

At times, Mather had been a director of other mining and steel manufacturing companies, such as Trumbull Steel, Mesaba-Cliffs Iron Mining Co., Otis Steel, Corrigan McKinney Steel, Newton Steel, Youngstown Sheet and Tube, Cleveland City Forge, and Bessemer Limestone & Cement Co. He was active in both the American Mining Congress and the Lake Superior Iron Ore Association.

He also sat on the boards of a wide range of companies unrelated to his core business interests, such as The Cleveland Trust Co., Lake Shore Realty, Lakeside and Marblehead Railroad, Lamson & Sessions, Mather Realty, Munising Paper Co., The Pettibone-Mulliken Co., Presque Isle Transportation Co., Thompson Products, and Great Lakes Towing Co.

== Philanthropy ==
Mather had long been interested in promoting the health and education of people in Cleveland, and the development of youth. In 1953, he set up the S. Livingston Mather Charitable Trust to support these efforts. As of 1995, it had assets of $3.8 million (equivalent to $7,124,000 in 2024).

Mather was a firm conservationist interested in preserving what remained of Ohio's ancient forests. In 1955, the Big Creek Land Co., which Mather had founded as a realty development company in the 1920s, donated 500 acres (200 ha) to the state of Ohio. It is now Big Creek Park, part of the Geauga Park District in Geauga County, Ohio. In 1957, Mather donated the 316 acres (128 ha) that comprised the Stebbins' Gulch area to Holden Arboretum.

Mather also gave extensively to higher education. His grandfather, Amasa Stone, had given $500,000 (equivalent to $13,911,000 in 2024) to Western Reserve College in 1880 to move from Hudson, Ohio, to Cleveland. A condition of the gift was that the undergraduate college be named for his deceased son, Adelbert. His mother, Flora Stone Mather, began making large donations to the college in 1888, and the women's undergraduate college (Western Reserve was gender segregated at the time) was named for her. From the time of his mother's death until the end of his own life, S. Livingston Mather was a trustee of Western Reserve. Mather also gave generously to Yale University throughout his life. In 1958, he gave $300,000 (equivalent to $2,495,000 in 2024) to establish a scholarship fund there.

== Personal life ==
Throughout his life, Mather was a member of the Episcopal Church of the United States.

Mather was a good horseman and enjoyed outdoor sports such as hunting, sailing, and sport shooting. He was a member of the Hermit Club, Kirtland Club, Union Club, University Club of Chicago, Yale Club of New York City, and the Mentor Harbor Yacht Club. He owned Mount Glen Farm, a 2,000-acre (810 ha) farm and forest that straddled the border of Geauga and Lake counties.

Mather's first wife was Grace Harman, whom he married on June 28, 1906. The couple had three children who survived infancy: Grace Flora, Elizabeth Harman, and Samuel Livingston IV. A fourth child, their first, a son named Samuel Harman, died after living just one day. Grace Mather died on June 24, 1931.

Mather then married Alice Keith, a 33 year old nurse, in the summer of 1932. He kept the marriage a secret for six months, until he could travel to Europe in December to tell his daughters, who were studying on the continent. Alice Mather died on December 7, 1950; the couple had no children.

Samuel Livingston Mather III traveled in Europe in the fall of 1959. His health declined rapidly after his return. He suffered from heart failure, and slipped into a coma at the end of the first week of September. He died at Mount Glen Farm on September 11, 1960, and was buried at Lake View Cemetery in Cleveland.

== Bibliography ==
- Avery, Elroy McKendree (1918). A History of Cleveland and Its Environs: The Heart of New Connecticut. Volume III. Chicago: Lewis Publishing Co.
