= Samuel Livingston Mather II =

American industrialist and philanthropist

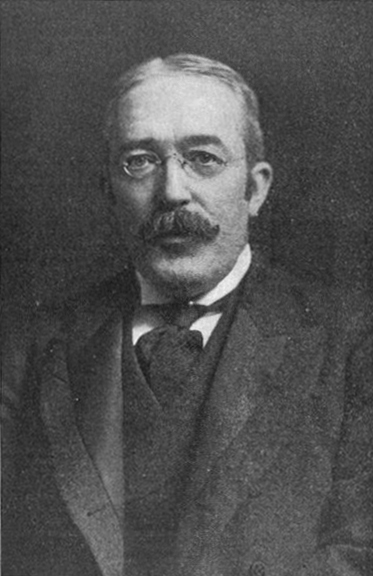
- Mather in 1908
- Born: July 13, 1851; Cleveland, Ohio, U.S.
- Died: October 18, 1931 (aged 80); Cleveland, Ohio, U.S.
- Other name: Samuel Mather Jr.
- Occupation: Businessman
- Known for: Shipping, iron mining
- Children: Samuel Livingston Mather III
- Father: Samuel Livingston Mather
- Relatives: William G. Mather (half-brother)

Samuel Livingston Mather II (July 13, 1851 – October 18, 1931), often referred to as S. Livingston Mather to distinguish him from his father, was an American industrialist and philanthropist from Cleveland, Ohio. He co-founded Pickands Mather and Company, a shipping and iron mining company which dominated these two Great Lakes industries from 1900 to 1960. For many years Mather was that city's richest citizen and a major philanthropist, contributing more than US$7 million to community-based organizations in the city.

== Life and career ==
Samuel Livingston Mather was born July 13, 1851, in Cleveland, Ohio, to Samuel Livingston and Georgiana Pomeroy (née Woolson) Mather. He was a descendant of Rev. Richard Mather, a famous English pastor who emigrated to North America in 1635. Although Reverend Richard Mather (1596-1669) was famously father to Reverend Increase Mather (1639-1723) and grandfather to Cotton Mather (1663-1728). Samuel Livingston Mather (1851-1931) descended from Richard's son Timothy "Farmer" Mather (1628-1685), Richard Mather (1653-1688), Samuel Mather (1683-1725), Captain Richard Mather (1712-1790), Samuel Mather (1745-1809), Samuel Mather (1771-1854), and Samuel Livingston Mather (1817-1890). His grandfather Samuel Mather, Jr. (1771-1854 ) was one of the original founders and shareholders in the Connecticut Land Company, which bought the Connecticut Western Reserve (which constituted what later became northeastern Ohio) in 1792. His grandmother Catherine Livingston (1787-1855) descended from Richard Livingston ("the Younger") (1663-1725), mayor of Albany NY from 1710-1719. His father, Samuel Livingston Mather (1817-1890) emigrated to the Western Reserve in 1843 at the age of 26, and in 1847 founded the Cleveland Iron Company. Samuel had one sister, Katherine Livingston Mather (born September 1853). His mother died two months after giving birth to Katherine, and his father then married Elizabeth L. Gwinn in June 1856. Mather's half-brother, William Gwinn Mather, was born in 1857.

Mather was educated in Cleveland's public schools, attending Cleveland High School before transferring to and graduating from St. Mark's School in Southborough, Massachusetts in 1869. Mather intended to attend Harvard University, but while working as a timekeeper in one of his father's mines in Ishpeming, Michigan, a premature explosion left him with a fractured skull, broken left arm, and a spinal injury. He spent the next three years convalescing (although the arm was left permanently stiff). He spent several months traveling in Europe in 1872 and returned to Cleveland in 1873, where he became an executive in his father's company.

In 1881, Mather married Flora Stone, daughter of Cleveland industrialist and railroad magnate Amasa Stone. Flora's sister was Clara Louise Stone, who married John Hay (1838-1905). He had been Abraham Lincoln's secretary and later became Secretary of State during the McKinley and Theodore Roosevelt administrations. Samuel and Flora spent nearly two years traveling in Europe before returning to Cleveland. The couple had four children: Samuel Livingston Mather III (born 1882), Amasa Stone Mather (born 1884), Constance (1889), and Philip Richard Mather (1894).

In 1883, Mather co-founded Pickands Mather and Company with James Pickands and Jay C. Morse. Pickands had risen to the rank of colonel in the 124th Ohio Volunteer Infantry during the American Civil War. In 1867, he moved to Marquette, Michigan, where he opened a hardware store selling tools and supplies to iron mining companies. He opened a fuel coal supply business three years later. He was elected mayor of Marquette in 1875, and five years later formed the Taylor Iron Co. (an iron mining concern) with Jay C. Morse. After Pickands' wife died in 1882, he moved to Cleveland. Jay C. Morse was a shipping agent for the Cleveland Iron Mining Company in Marquette. He invested widely in Michigan iron mines, and by 1882 was a wealthy man ready to form his own company. Determined to make his own fortune and impress his father-in-law after his return from Europe, Mather sought out business partners. Pickands Mather and Company was formed in 1883, dealing in iron ore and pig iron, and mining iron ore from two mines in the Marquette Iron Range.

Pickands Mather became one of the four major iron ore companies in the United States through the operation of extensive mines in the Lake Superior region. By providing ample access to iron ore, steel, and shipping, Mather became increasingly wealthy through the profits reaped by the company and through the inheritance left to him from his father.

In late 1894, John D. Rockefeller gained control of Lake Superior Consolidated Mines, which owned extensive properties on the Mesabi Iron Range in Minnesota. Rockefeller perceived that, just as had happened in petroleum refining, overproduction was occurring and suicidal competition was likely to cause most mining companies to collapse. Rockefeller had secured a monopoly on oil refining by controlling transportation, and he saw the Lake Superior Consolidated's railroad and lakeshore property in Duluth as the potential key to building an iron ore monopoly. In early 1895, he asked Mather to obtain contracts with shipbuilders around the Great Lakes for 12 ore freighters. Rockefeller bluntly told Mather than he could assist in building a fleet and get a large commission, or Mather would seek out someone else. Mather contacted as many shipyards as he could, asking each to submit a bid. Each did so, submitting a low-cost bid in order to win the contract. Mather then accepted the 12 lowest bids. Rockefeller spent $3 million (equivalent to $98,031,000 in 2024) building the ships, and in March 1896 announced the creation of the Bessemer Steamship Company, with 12 freighters.

== Charitable works ==
Mather gave generously to educational and health institutions throughout his life. During the First World War he raised US$4.5 million for the Red Cross and financed the sending of a unit of Lakeside Hospital to France. Mather also served as a trustee of Western Reserve University for forty-five years, contributing to the provision of residential accommodation and additional classroom facilities benefiting women students. Other gifts included the installation of Anne's Tablet on Mackinac Island, Michigan as a tribute to his aunt, noted author Constance Fenimore Woolson.

At Kenyon College, Mather was known for decades for his generous financial gifts and management of the college's financial affairs. Mather was a trustee to Kenyon for forty-three years; before his death, Mather was the oldest living member of Kenyon's Board of Trustees. According to Kenyon College, Mather donated over a half-million dollars to the school while he served as a trustee there. His largest single financial gift to the school was $100,000 in 1922 for the building of Leonard Hall. (He made this contribution anonymously.)

The Old Main Library at Rikkyo University, Tokyo was financed by Mather in 1918. The library was named in honor of his father, Samuel Livingston Mather, who was a longtime supporter of overseas mission activities of the Episcopal Church.

== Death and legacy ==
Mather suffered from heart problems at the end of his life. His heart began to fail on October 10, 1931, and he died of heart disease on October 18.

Mather left $100,000 in his will to Kenyon College. The Samuel Mather Science Hall was built in Mather's name at the request of his business associate Henry G. Dalton, who gave money to Kenyon for the construction of the building. Seven Great Lakes merchant ships have been named in Mather's honor.

Perhaps his greatest legacy is the Mather Mansion, at Cleveland State University, which has survived the wrecking ball many times.

== Bibliography ==
- Avery, Elroy McKendree (1918). A History of Cleveland and Its Environs, the Heart of New Connecticut. Volume III. Chicago: Lewis Publishing Co.
- Chernow, Ron (2004). Titan: The Life of John D. Rockefeller, Sr. New York: Vintage Books. ISBN 9781400077304.
- Chesnutt, Charles Waddell (2002). Crisler, Jesse S.; Leitz, Robert C.; McElrath, Joseph R. (eds.). An Exemplary Citizen: Letters of Charles W. Chesnutt, 1906-1932. Stanford, Calif.: Stanford University Press. ISBN 9780804745086.
- Ingham, John N. (1983). Biographical Dictionary of American Business Leaders. Volume 2. H-M. Westport, Conn.: Greenwood Press. ISBN 9780313239083.
- Reynolds, Terry S.; Dawson, Virginia P. (2011). Iron Will: Cleveland-Cliffs and the Mining of Iron Ore, 1847-2006. Detroit: Wayne State University Press. ISBN 9780814336434.
- Rose, William Ganson (1990). Cleveland: The Making of a City. Kent, Ohio: Kent State University Press. ISBN 9780873384285.
- Thompson, Mark L. (1994). Queen of the Lakes. Detroit: Wayne State University Press. ISBN 9780814323939.
- Whelan, Ned (2014). Matisak, Anna; Rohn-Tielke, Christine (eds.). The Interlake Steamship Company: In Service to America Since 1913. Middleburg Heights, Ohio: Interlake Steamship Company. OCLC 933388245.
