= Bratenahl, Ohio =

- Village
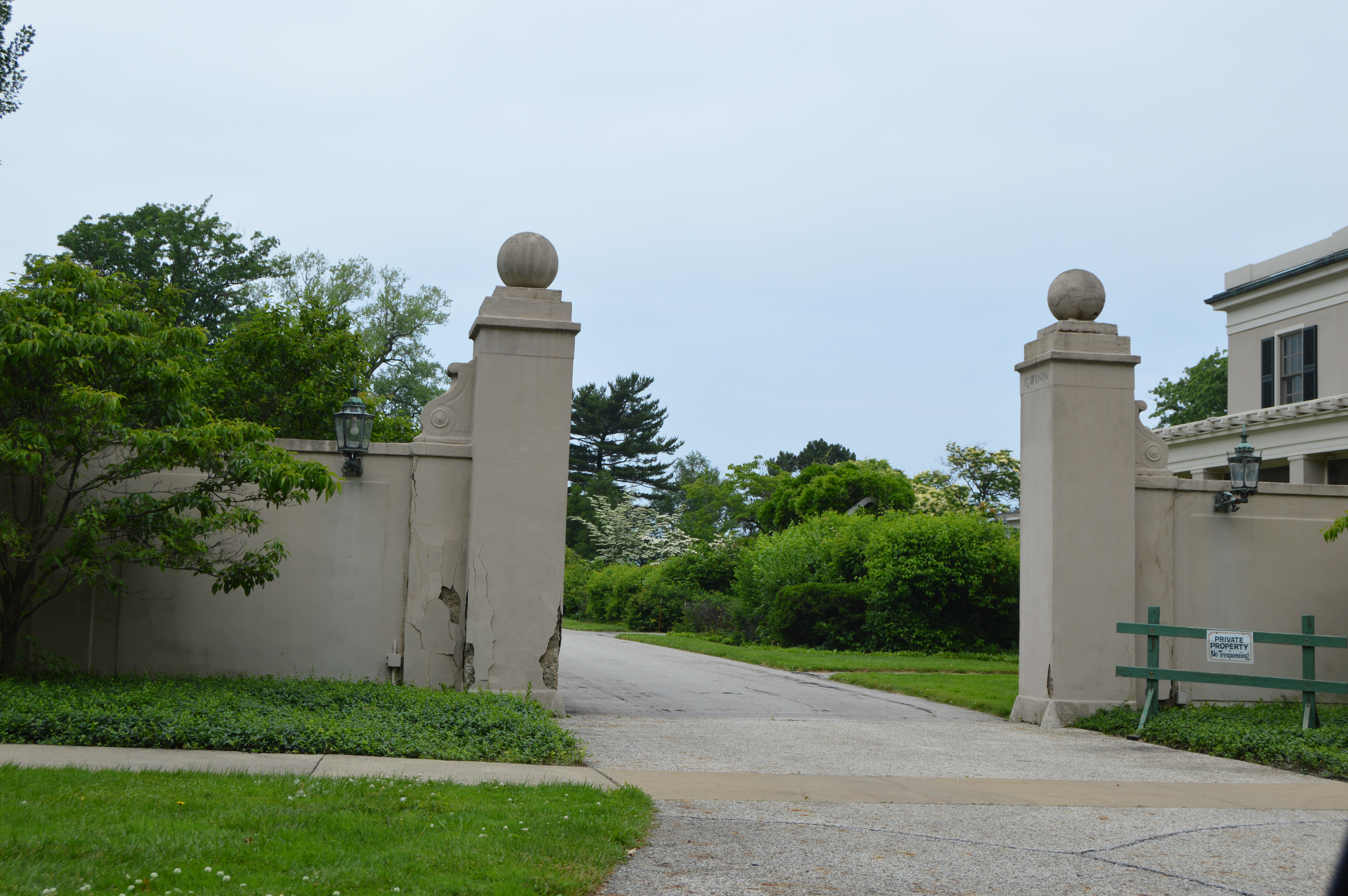
- Gateway to the Gwinn Estate entrance on Lakeshore Boulevard

- Interactive map of Bratenahl, Ohio
- Location within Ohio Location within the United States
- Coordinates: 41°33′15″N 81°36′16″W
- Country: United States
- State: Ohio
- County: Cuyahoga

Government
  - Type: Mayor-council
  - Mayor: Keith Ari Benjamin (D)
  - Council President Pro Tempore: Joyce Burke-Jones (D)

Area
  - Total: 1.22 sq mi (3.16 km^{2})
  - Land: 1.03 sq mi (2.66 km^{2})
  - Water: 0.19 sq mi (0.50 km^{2})
- Elevation: 614 ft (187 m)

Population (2020)
  - Total: 1,430
  - Estimate (2023): 1,395
  - Density: 1,392.6/sq mi (537.69/km^{2})
- Time zone: UTC-5 (Eastern (EST))
  - Summer (DST): UTC-4 (EDT)
- ZIP code: 44108 & 44110
- Area code: 216
- FIPS code: 39-08336
- GNIS feature ID: 1048543
- Website: www.bratenahl.org

Bratenahl (/ˈbrætənɑːl/ BRAT-ən-ahl) is a village in Cuyahoga County, Ohio, United States, on the southern shore of Lake Erie. One of Cleveland's oldest streetcar suburbs, it is bordered by the city on three sides and by the Lake Erie shoreline to the north. The population was 1,430 at the 2020 census.

== History ==
Bratenahl was incorporated in 1903, and named after its founder, Charles Bratenahl. It is one of the older residential suburbs of Cleveland along with Shaker Heights, Lakewood, and Cleveland Heights; of these, Bratenahl has the highest per capita wealth. Bratenahl is a small community of fewer than 1,200 population inhabiting approximately 700 households, some of which are stately estates, townhouses, and condominiums on the lakefront.

Bratenahl is home to a once controversial luxury high-rise condominium complex named Bratenahl Place. Though many residents opposed it at the time, in 1967 two large multi-occupancy buildings of brutalist architectural design were built on the lakefront. One of the two structures was originally intended to be a 180-unit rental apartment building, while the other, smaller one was a condominium from its inception. In 1976 however, the larger one also became a condominium.

Bratenahl was the subject of a joint Marshall Project and WEWS investigation that found that the majority of drivers cited for traffic violations by the Bratenahl police were Black. The report found that Bratenahl village had assessed more than $700,000 in fines, court costs, and other revenue since 2020, mostly from Black drivers passing through the village's jurisdiction.

== Geography ==
Bratenahl is located at 41°33′15″N 81°36′16″W (41.554275, −81.604574).

According to the United States Census Bureau, the village has a total area of 1.60 square miles (4.14 km^{2}), of which 1.02 square miles (2.64 km^{2}) is land and 0.58 square miles (1.50 km^{2}) is water.

== Demographics ==
Historical population
Census	Pop.	Note	%±
1910	690		—
1920	1,000		44.9%
1930	1,308		30.8%
1940	1,350		3.2%
1950	1,240		−8.1%
1960	1,332		7.4%
1970	1,613		21.1%
1980	1,485		−7.9%
1990	1,356		−8.7%
2000	1,337		−1.4%
2010	1,197		−10.5%
2020	1,430		19.5%
2023 (est.)	1,395	▼	−2.4%

=== 2020 census ===
Bratenahl village, Ohio – Racial and ethnic composition Note: the US Census treats Hispanic/Latino as an ethnic category. This table excludes Latinos from the racial categories and assigns them to a separate category. Hispanics/Latinos may be of any race.
Race / Ethnicity (NH = Non-Hispanic)	Pop 2000	Pop 2010	Pop 2020	% 2000	% 2010	% 2020
White alone (NH)	1,126	954	1,048	84.22%	79.70%	73.29%
Black or African American alone (NH)	164	186	225	12.27%	15.54%	15.73%
Native American or Alaska Native alone (NH)	1	3	0	0.07%	0.25%	0.00%
Asian alone (NH)	10	30	55	0.75%	2.51%	3.85%
Native Hawaiian or Pacific Islander alone (NH)	0	0	0	0.00%	0.00%	0.00%
Other race alone (NH)	0	2	21	0.00%	0.17%	1.47%
Mixed race or Multiracial (NH)	21	11	45	1.57%	0.92%	3.15%
Hispanic or Latino (any race)	15	11	36	1.12%	0.92%	2.52%
Total	1,337	1,197	1,430	100.00%	100.00%	100.00%

=== 2010 census ===
As of the census of 2010, there were 1,197 people, 679 households, and 333 families living in the village. The population density was 1,173.5 inhabitants per square mile (453.1/km^{2}). There were 811 housing units at an average density of 795.1 per square mile (307.0/km^{2}). The racial makeup of the village was 80.5% White, 15.5% African American, 0.3% Native American, 2.5% Asian, 0.3% from other races, and 0.9% from two or more races. Hispanic or Latino of any race were 0.9% of the population.

There were 679 households, of which 7.4% had children under the age of 18 living with them, 42.1% were married couples living together, 5.3% had a female householder with no husband present, 1.6% had a male householder with no wife present, and 51.0% were non-families. 42.7% of all households were made up of individuals, and 16% had someone living alone who was 65 years of age or older. The average household size was 1.75 and the average family size was 2.32.

The median age in the village was 57.8 years. 6.5% of residents were under the age of 18; 4% were between the ages of 18 and 24; 16.4% were from 25 to 44; 42.2% were from 45 to 64; and 31.1% were 65 years of age or older. The gender makeup of the village was 48.6% male and 51.4% female.

Of the village's population over the age of 25, 62.4% hold a bachelor's degree or higher.

=== 2000 census ===
As of the census of 2000, there were 1,337 people, 711 households, and 363 families living in the village. The population density was 1,304.1 inhabitants per square mile (503.5/km^{2}). There were 800 housing units at an average density of 780.3 per square mile (301.3/km^{2}). The racial makeup of the village was 86.82% White, 10.34% African American, 0.07% Native American, 0.75% Asian, 0.22% from other races, and 1.80% from two or more races. Hispanic or Latino of any race were 1.12% of the population.

There were 711 households, out of which 11.8% had children under the age of 18 living with them, 43.7% were married couples living together, 5.5% had a female householder with no husband present, and 48.9% were non-families. 40.9% of all households were made up of individuals, and 15.9% had someone living alone who was 65 years of age or older. The average household size was 1.87 and the average family size was 2.50.

In the village, the population was spread out, with 11.4% under the age of 18, 3.4% from 18 to 24, 21.8% from 25 to 44, 36.2% from 45 to 64, and 27.2% who were 65 years of age or older. The median age was 51 years. For every 100 females there were 93.2 males. For every 100 females age 18 and over, there were 90.8 males.

The median income for a household in the village was $76,028, and the median income for a family was $104,987. Males had a median income of $61,250 versus $46,563 for females. The per capita income for the village was $72,757. About 1.6% of families and 4.3% of the population were below the poverty line, including 4.1% of those under the age of 18 and 2.7% of those ages 65 or older.

== Notable people ==
- Jim Backus, actor and comedian
- Abram Garfield, architect and son of U.S. President James Garfield
- Margaret Hamilton, actress best known for The Wizard of Oz
- Travis Kelce, NFL player for the Kansas City Chiefs
- Kevin Love, basketball player
- Eliot Ness, law enforcement agent
- Taylor Swift, singer-songwriter
- Tristan Thompson, basketball player
