= William G. Mather =

William Gwinn Mather
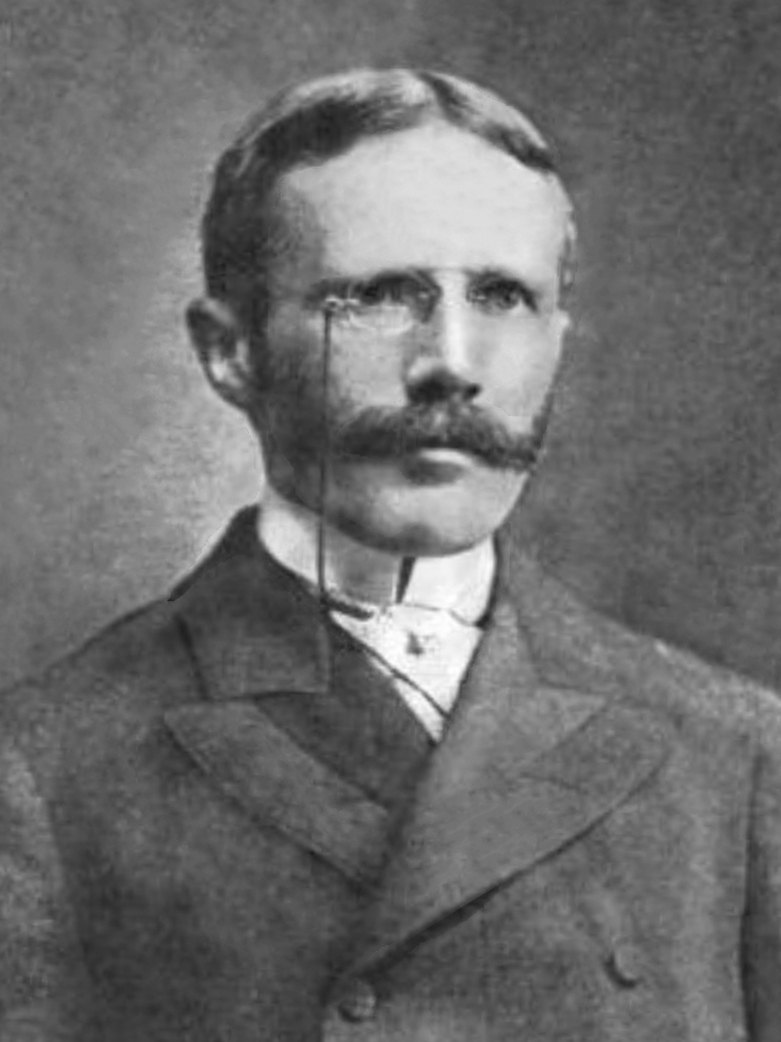
- Born: September 22, 1857; Cleveland, Ohio, United States
- Died: April 5, 1951 (aged 93); Bratenahl, Ohio, United States
- Resting place: Lake View Cemetery
- Education: Trinity College

William Gwinn Mather (September 22, 1857 – April 5, 1951) was an American industrialist.

Mather was born in Cleveland, Ohio and attended Trinity College for his undergraduate and MA degrees. Mather headed the Cleveland-Cliffs Iron Company for 50 years from 1890 through 1940. During his tenure he consolidated several mining operations and diversified into iron-ore industries and steel operations. The company's flagship bulk freighter was named in his honor, and today serves as a maritime museum in Cleveland, Ohio.

== Gwinn Estate ==
Mather is also known for the palatial estate, Gwinn, he built in Bratenahl, Ohio, a luxury suburb east of Cleveland. The estate's gardens were designed by Charles A. Platt, Ellen Biddle Shipman, and Warren H. Manning. The gardens, named for Mather's mother Elizabeth Lucy Gwinn, include a mixture of formal and "wild" gardens and extensive statuary and fountains designed by significant sculptors including Paul Manship.

== Gwinn Michigan ==
In 1901, Mather purchased land in Marquette County, Michigan for his company's operations. He had Warren H. Manning design a residential community to support his operations. On June 24, 2002, Gwinn, Michigan was listed in the National Register of Historic Places as the "Gwinn Model Town Historic District, Forsyth Township, Marquette County, Michigan".

== See also ==
- SS William G. Mather (1905)
- SS. William G. Mather Maritime Museum in Cleveland, Ohio
- Gwinn, Michigan
