= James Corrigan (businessman) =

American mining, shipping, and steel executive

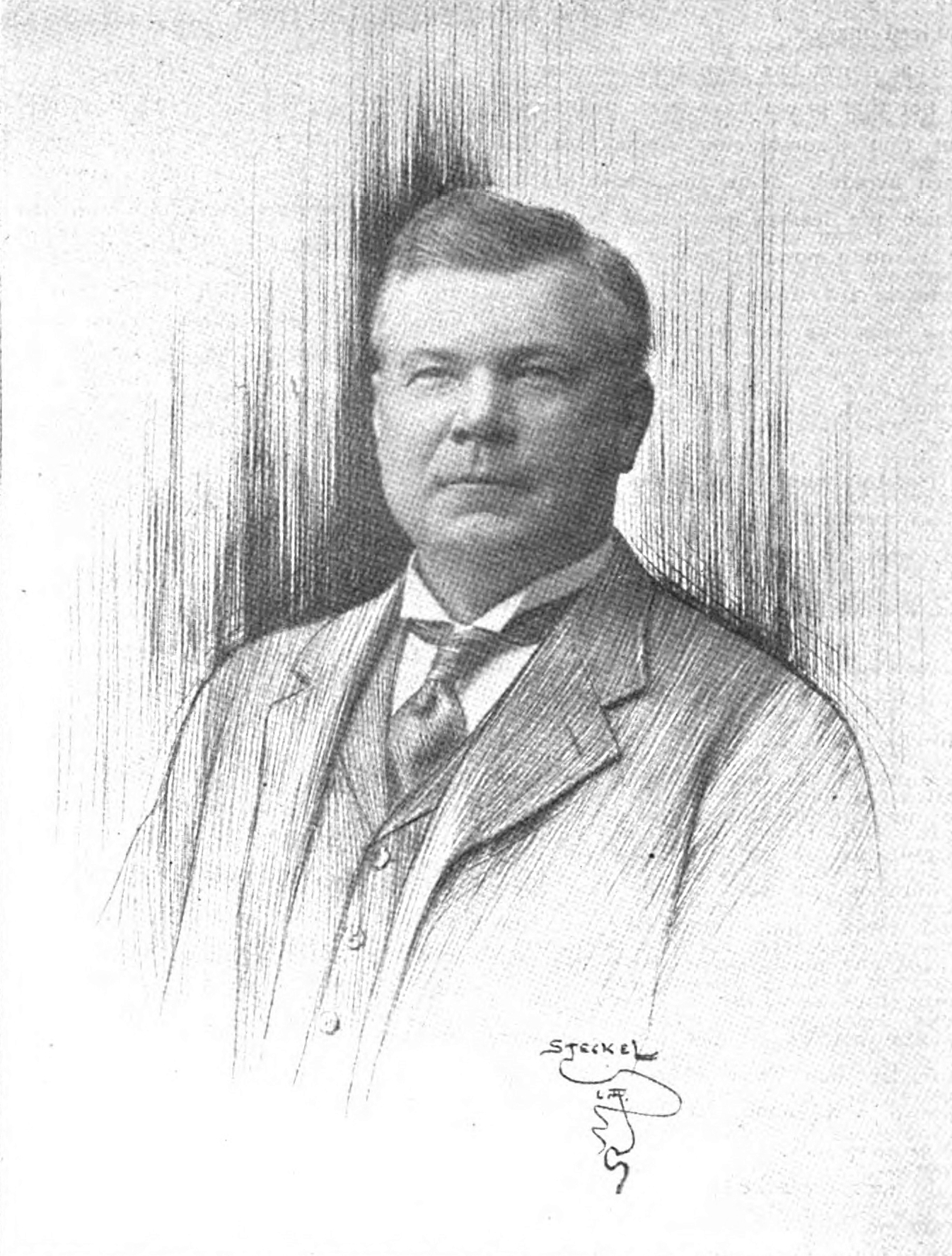
- Born: James C. Corrigan; May 1, 1846; Morrisburg, Ontario, Canada
- Died: December 24, 1908 (aged 62); Cleveland, Ohio, U.S.
- Occupations: Mining, shipping, and steel company executive
- Years active: 1867–1908
- Known for: Founding Corrigan, McKinney Steel

James C. Corrigan (May 1, 1846 – December 24, 1908) was a Canadian-American businessman active in the shipping, petroleum refining, iron ore mining and selling, and steel manufacturing industries. He made and lost fortunes in the shipping and refining industries, and was known as "one of the group of men who made Cleveland".

Emigrating to the United States from Canada as a boy, he became a sailor on the Great Lakes. After sailing a boat that shipped refined petroleum, he became involved in petroleum refining in Cleveland, Ohio, and became wealthy. His early years in sailing led him into the shipping industry as an adult, moving iron ore, grain, timber, and other goods. He sued John D. Rockefeller after Rockefeller seized his Standard Oil stock in repayment for mortgages on his vessels, co-founded the Lake Carriers Association, and won a lawsuit which successfully voided a common vessel insurance clause.

He was an early investor in iron mines on the Mesabi, Gogebic, Marquette, Menominee, and Vermilion iron ranges. A small investment in an iron ore dealing businesses, taken in exchange for freight charges, was turned into Corrigan, McKinney & Co., one of the largest independent dealers in iron ore in the United States. He began vertically integrating the company, investing in five different iron smelting businesses before founding the steel firm Corrigan, McKinney Steel shortly before his death.

An avid yachtsman, Corrigan lost nearly all his family when his luxury yacht, the Idler, sank in a storm off Cleveland in 1900. His Ohio country house became the Nagirroc farm, one of the historic country estates in Lake County, Ohio. His New York country house on Dry Island was a regional landmark. A multimillionaire at the time of his death, he left his wealth to family members.

Although he founded five Great Lakes shipping firms and owned the largest independent iron ore mining company in the Midwest, he is best known as the founder of the Corrigan, McKinney Steel company.

== Early life ==
James Corrigan was born May 1, 1846, (Note: Sources provide variations in the year of his birth. Historian JoAnn King notes that he was reportedly five years old in the Canadian census of 1851, giving a birth year of 1846. But in the Canadian census of 1861, he was listed as 12 years old, giving a birth year of 1849. The otherwise accurate obituary in the magazine The Iron Trade Review gave his birth date as 1848. Corrigan left home in 1861. It seems more likely that he left home at the age of 14, not 12 or 13, so this article uses the 1846 date. However, obituaries in the press sometimes put his date of birth at 1829 or 1828.) in Morrisburg, Ontario, Canada, to Johnson C. and Jane (née Anderson) Corrigan. (Note: King notes that the father's name is sometimes spelled Johnson and sometimes Johnston. The family's last name was variously spelled Corrigan, Corigan, and Currigan. King uses Johnson, as does this article.)

His father, a laborer, emigrated to Dundas County, Ontario, Canada, from County Mayo, Ireland, in the late 1830s. His mother also emigrated to Canada from Ireland about the same time. The couple married in 1838. James was the second of eight children. His siblings included John (born 1843), Johnson Jr. (born 1848), Murry (born 1850), Mary (born 1854), Robert (born 1856), Margaret (born 1858), Richard (born 1858), and William (born 1860). (Note: Murry died some time in the 1850s.) James's uncle, Robert Corrigan, was a somewhat prosperous farmer in Dundas County. James's father, on the other hand, was nearly destitute. In the 1850s, his father owned no land and no livestock, and worked as a hired hand and casual laborer. The family lived in a shanty, whereas most farmers in the area lived in houses. Johnson Corrigan Sr. managed to build his family a log cabin by 1861.

When James was still young, his father worked for a time filling an elevated water tank for the Grand Trunk Railway 0.5 miles (0.80 km) east of Morrisburg. The tank was filled with a hand pump, and it took hard work and several hours to fill it. Trains stopped to rewater at the tank several times a day. Johnson Corrigan often delegated this task to his sons, John and James, who would work the pump together.

The family was somewhat itinerant, living in several villages in Ontario and for eight years in Cleveland, Ohio, in the United States. The Corrigans later moved to Minnesota, where they had a farm in the Red River Valley (later inherited or purchased by James), before returning to Ontario.

James C. Corrigan's mother, Jane, died on January 31, 1861. His father later married Sarah Wood, and they had two children, Matilda and Henry.

=== Emigration to the United States ===
Johnson Corrigan was a stern father, and James had an unhappy home life. By 1860, James and his older brother John were no longer living at home, but with another local farmer. Historian JoAnn King concludes that they were likely hired out as farm hands, living a life of forced labor. James and John ran off in 1861, emigrating to Ogdensburg, New York, in the United States. When James turned 17, he became a sailor on a schooner on the Great Lakes. He remained a sailor for six years.

In 1867 or 1868, James began sailing the sloop Trial for owner Martin Golden, transporting refined petroleum products during the summer months from Cleveland across Lake Erie to Port Stanley, Ontario. In April 1869, James purchased the Trial from Golden. Great Lakes historian John Brandt Mansfield says that the first year Corrigan owned the Trial, a sailor was washed overboard in a storm. Corrigan leapt into a lifeboat and rescued him. The two spent 14 hours on Lake Erie before being rescued by another vessel.

== Petroleum refining ==
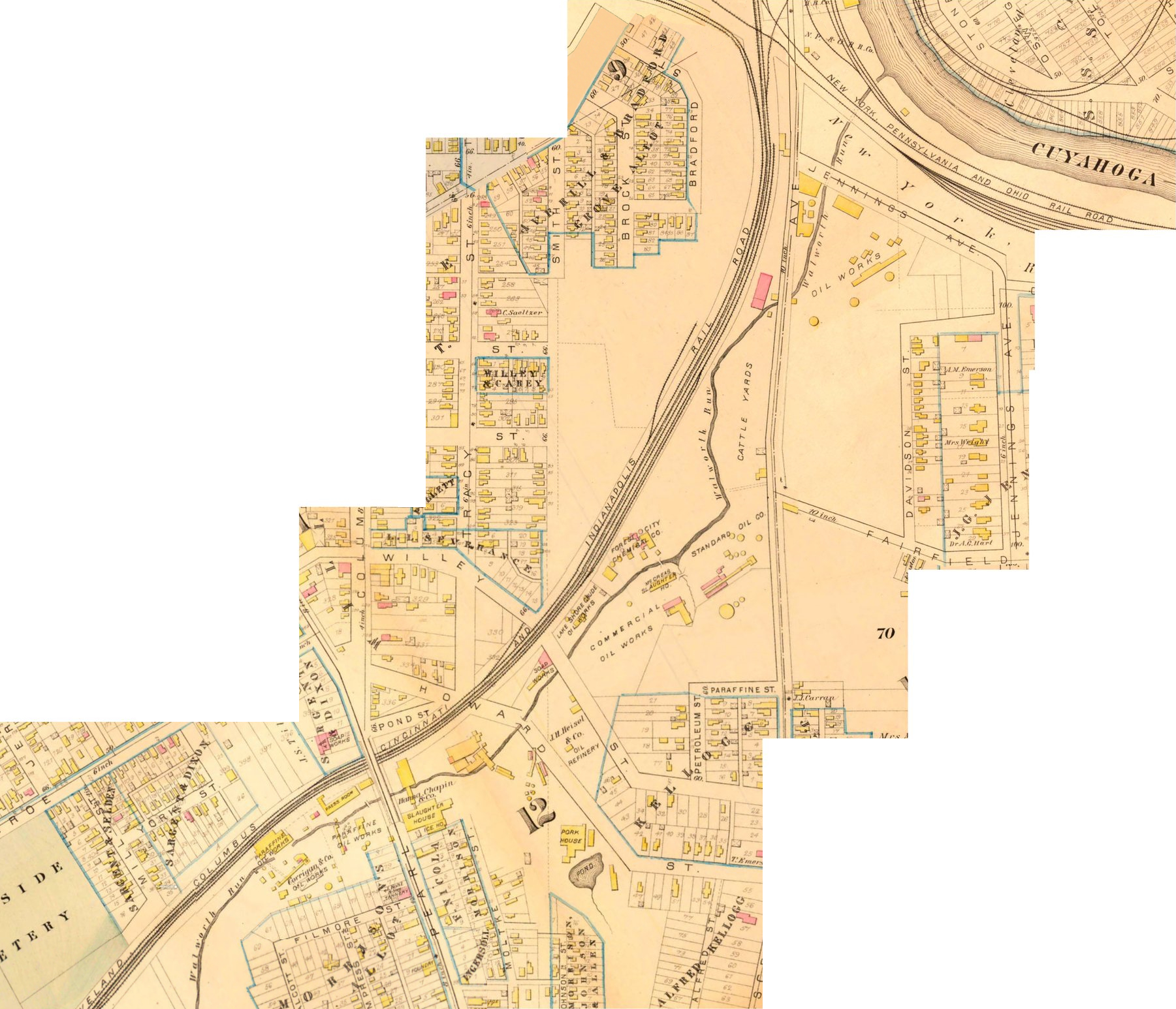
1881 map of Walworth Run in Cleveland, Ohio. The Corrigan oil refining works are at lower left.

During the winter months, when the Great Lakes were ice-bound, James Corrigan began making experiments in petroleum refining on his own, aided by a German immigrant professor of chemistry who taught in Cleveland. His older brother, John Corrigan, established a small crude oil refinery in 1870 on Walworth Run in Cleveland.

James began oil refining on Walworth Run, a stream on Cleveland's west side, in 1871, doing business as Corrigan & Wells. (Note: Some sources place the establishment of this refinery in 1868 or 1869. There is no James Corrigan listed in the 1868 Cleveland Leader Annual City Directory, and John Corrigan is listed as a laborer. There is no James Corrigan listed in the 1860 Cleveland Leader Annual City Directory, although John Corrigan is listed as an "oil refiner". John is listed as either a dealer or refiner of coal oil in the 1870 Wiggins & Weaver's Directory of the City of Cleveland, but there is no listing for James. The first newspaper article to mention John Corrigan as an oil refiner is in 1870, but there is no mention of James. His business was listed separately from that of John Corrigan's refinery, leading to the conclusion that James did not enter the refining business until 1871.) His refinery was capable of processing 200 barrels (32 m^{3}) of crude oil a day, making it one of the largest refineries in Cleveland. In 1872, the firm was known as Corrigan & Timmins. The company named became Corrigan & Co. in 1873, indicating James had become the majority partner in the firm.

Corrigan & Co.'s oil works were also located on Walworth Run. The original works were on the south side of the street at about what is now 2258 Train Avenue. Corrigan called his refinery the Excelsior Oil Works. (Note: Corrigan's Excelsior Oil Works should not be confused with Standard Oil's Excelsior Oil Works, built in 1862 and located 1.5 miles (2.4 km) east across the Cuyahoga River on Kingsbury Run. This was the main Standard Oil refining facility, also known as Standard Oil Works No. 1. Standard Oil also had a paraffin refining factory, called the Excelsior Wax Works. Also located on Walworth Run, they were about where 1730 Train Street and 2200 Scranton Avenue are today. The Plain Dealer newspaper and some other sources sometimes called the wax works "Standard Oil Works No. 6" and sometimes called the Standard Oil main works on Kingsbury Run "Standard Oil Works No. 6". Rockefeller built a second very large refinery, known as the Standard Works, in 1865 at head of Kingsbury Run.)

James took his brother John into the business in 1874, and changed the company name to Corrigan Brothers. By at least 1875, Corrigan's Excelsior Oil Works had expanded into a second building east of the Pearl Street bridge over Walworth Run, more than doubling the refinery's capacity to 500 barrels (79 m^{3}) a day.

James Corrigan invented a refining process that allowed him to crack specialty oils from crude petroleum. He was able to produce mineral seal oil, (Note: Mineral seal oil is a class of mineral oils derived from petroleum. Other mineral oils are paraffin oil and kerosene. Mineral seal oil has a gravity of 38.5° to 39° Bé, a flash point of 255° F, and a viscosity of 45 to 50 at 100 °F.) cylinder oil, (Note: Cylinder oil is a steam refined, charcoal filtered oil with a gravity of 25° to 29° Bé, a flash point of not less than 500 °F, a viscosity of 500 at 60 °F, and a viscosity of 100 at 150 °F.) and paraffin wax. Standard Oil of Ohio later leased the process from him.

Corrigan also invested in other refineries as early as 1872. (Note: Mansfield's History of the Great Lakes says James Corrigan also owned the Chase, Commercial, and Doan refineries. Corrigan may have invested in these businesses, but did not own them. The Chase and Doan companies were the same thing: William Halsey Doan moved to Cleveland in 1866 and organized W.H. Doan & Company to sell crude oil on commission. He added Stephen Harkness as a partner, and formed the firm of Harkness & Doan to supply crude oil to refiners. He bought out Harkness in 1867, and in 1873 Doan sold his business to Standard Oil. That same year, Doan and George N. Chase formed a refining operation to manufacture kerosene and naphtha. Doan bought out Chase in the autumn of 1873. Doan then incorporated the I.X.L. Oil & Naphtha Works which he still owned in 1877. The Commercial Oil Company was incorporated in 1872 by Jesse P. Bishop, Nicholas Heisel, Judson M. Bishop, J. Henry Heisel, and Seymour F. Adams. Judson M. Bishop was the active partner; the others were silent investors. The company remained in the hands of the five incorporators until at least 1898.) At their peak, the Corrigans were earning $300,000 a year (equivalent to $8,500,000 in 2024) from petroleum refining.

Corrigan leased his oil refinery to Standard Oil in 1879, having established in 1878 a new company, the Ohio Nut & Bolt Co. The factory was located on Division Street. (Note: Historian JoAnn King speculates that this was the beginning of the Corrigan iron and smelting business.)

Corrigan likely sold Ohio Nut & Bolt in April 1879 and moved to the region of Galicia, then part of Austria-Hungary, where he leased oil fields from Prince Alexandru B. Știrbei and built oil refineries near the cities of Grybów and Kolomyia. Standard Oil invested $32,000 in Corrigan's refinery (equivalent to $911,000 in 2024), which cost $40,000 to build (equivalent to $1,138,000 in 2024). The oil fields proved to be not very productive, generating less than 100,000 barrels by 1880, and of an inferior quality that was difficult to refine.

While in Galicia, Corrigan sold his Cleveland refinery in 1881 to Standard Oil in exchange for stock in Standard Oil. (Note: John Corrigan took cash in the transaction. Rockefeller biographer Allan Nevins claimed the buyout occurred in 1872, and that James Corrigan received stock in Standard Oil for his refinery. Nevins draws the conclusion that Corrigan received his stock in 1872. However, Corrigan did not actually get his Standard Oil stock until 1881, indicating Nevins's conclusion is incorrect as to the date.) He sold his assets in Galicia and returned to the United States in 1882. By January 1883, he was operating a new oil refinery on Walworth Run between Pearl and Mill streets.

Corrigan continued to operate a refinery in 1884 and 1885, although no firm name was specified. In 1886, he was named president of the newly organized Dangler Naphtha Refining Company, a new specialty refinery organized by David A. Dangler, president of the Crystal Carbon Company (a firm that manufactured carbon points for arc lights). (Standard Oil was an investor in Dangler Naphtha Refining Co.)

James Corrigan exited the petroleum refining industry in 1887 in favor of shipping, although Dangler Naphtha continued in operation.

== Shipping ==
=== "Corrigan fleet" and Corrigan, Huntington and Co. ===
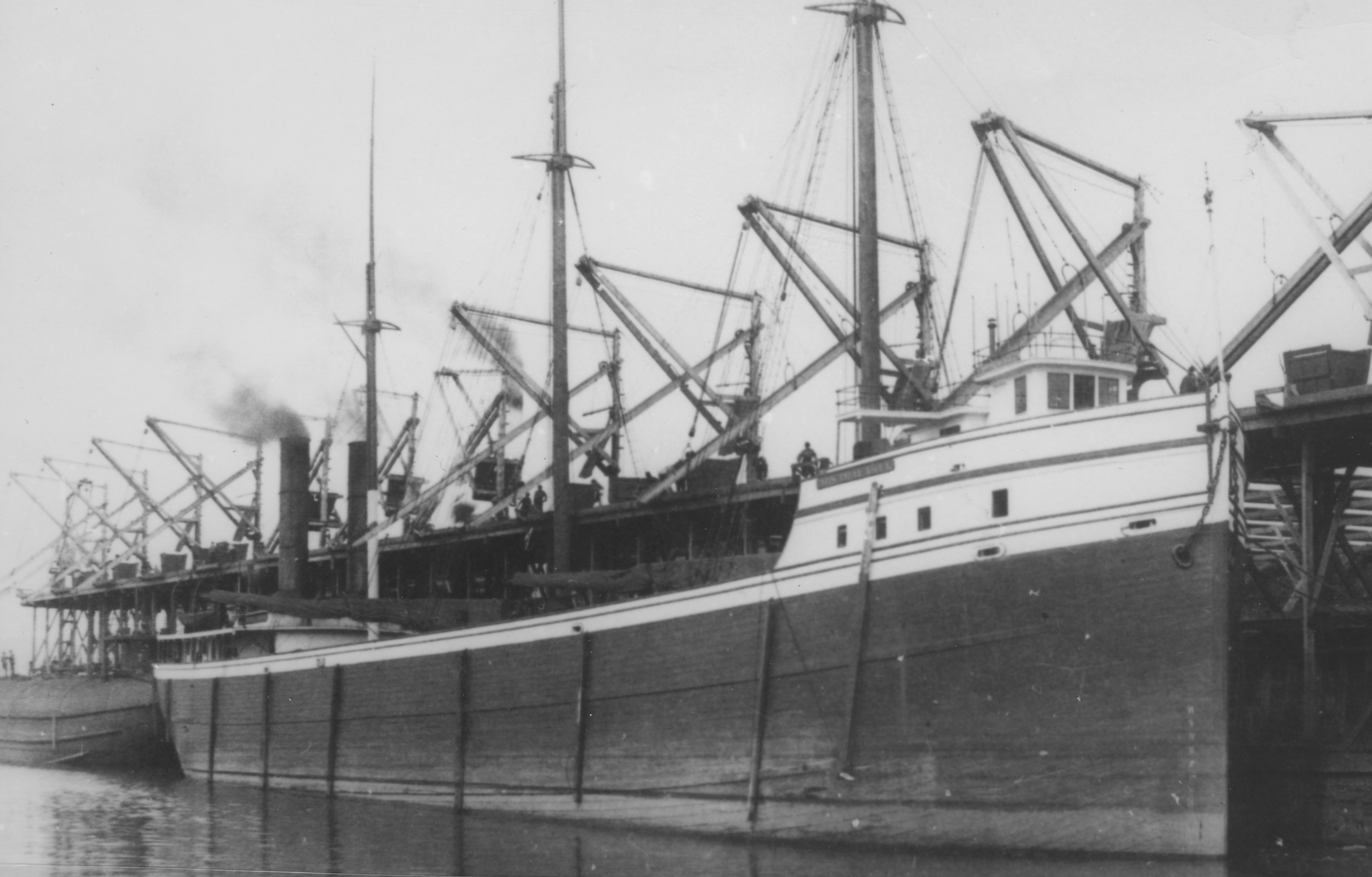
The Australasia, one of many vessels personally owned by James Corrigan

According to The Plain Dealer newspaper, Corrigan established five different shipping companies in his lifetime. Until the establishment of the first two firms in 1893, he personally owned these vessels, and they were generally known as the "Corrigan fleet" during this time. He obtained inexpensive boats, ran them hard, and insured them heavily. Corrigan steamers could be identified by their black hulls and stacks, and their reddish-brown cabins.

Corrigan became interested in shipping in the spring of 1872, but it wasn't until March 1877 that he began to form a shipping fleet. His first vessel was a schooner co-owned with his brother John, and named the Hippogriff. Likely purchased at auction in March 1877, it sank on September 28, 1877, after a collision.

James Corrigan then purchased the schooners Niagara (for $31,000 [equivalent to $909,000 in 2024]) and Richards (for $8,000 [equivalent to $235,000 in 2024]) in 1883. (Note: He sold the Richards in 1888.)

Corrigan rapidly built his shipping fleet. In December 1885, he purchased the steamer Raleigh for $40,000 (equivalent to $1,230,000 in 2024) and her consort Lucerne for $20,000 (equivalent to $615,000 in 2024). (Note: Corrigan immediately sold a one-ninth interest in the Niagara, Raleigh and Lucerne to William S. Mack. The Lucerne sank off Ashland, Wisconsin, on November 19, 1886.) The following year, he bought a two-ninths interest in the schooner James Couch for $6,222 (equivalent to $191,000 in 2024), and the barge R.J. Carney for $12,000 (equivalent to $369,000 in 2024). (Note: Corrigan sold the R.J. Carney in 1889.) With oil magnate John Huntington, he purchased the steamer SS Australasia and the schooner Polynesia for $160,000 (equivalent to $4,921,000 in 2024).

1886 saw Corrigan create his first shipping business. In October of that year, he, John Huntington, and Huntington's son, William R. Huntington, formed a stock company worth $200,000 (equivalent to $6,151,000 in 2024) named "James Corrigan, Huntington & Co.". Ownership of the Australasia, Polynesia, Niagara, and Raleigh were transferred to the new firm, which Corrigan operated. In early January 1887, Corrigan sold his interest in the James Couch, Niagara, and Raleigh to the firm for $160,000 (equivalent to $4,885,000 in 2024).

Corrigan became a member of the Cleveland Vessel Owners' Association (CVOA) in April 1886. This organization, established in March 1868, was highly influential in establishing inland waterway navigation rules, improving shipping channels, lobbying for the removal of waterway obstacles, winning the improvement of port operations, and more. Corrigan was highly active in the CVOA, which usually met in his offices in the Perry-Payne Building in Cleveland.

Corrigan repurchased the James Couch and Raleigh from Corrigan, Huntington & Co. in early 1887. (Note: He may have then leased the James Couch to Corrigan, Huntington & Co.) James and his brother, John, then jointly purchased the schooners George W. Adams and David Dows (for a total of $125,000 [equivalent to $3,816,000 in 2024]). (Note: They may have leased the George W. Adams to Corrigan, Huntington & Co.)

Corrigan's shipping empire had made him a millionaire by 1889.

=== Rockefeller lawsuit ===
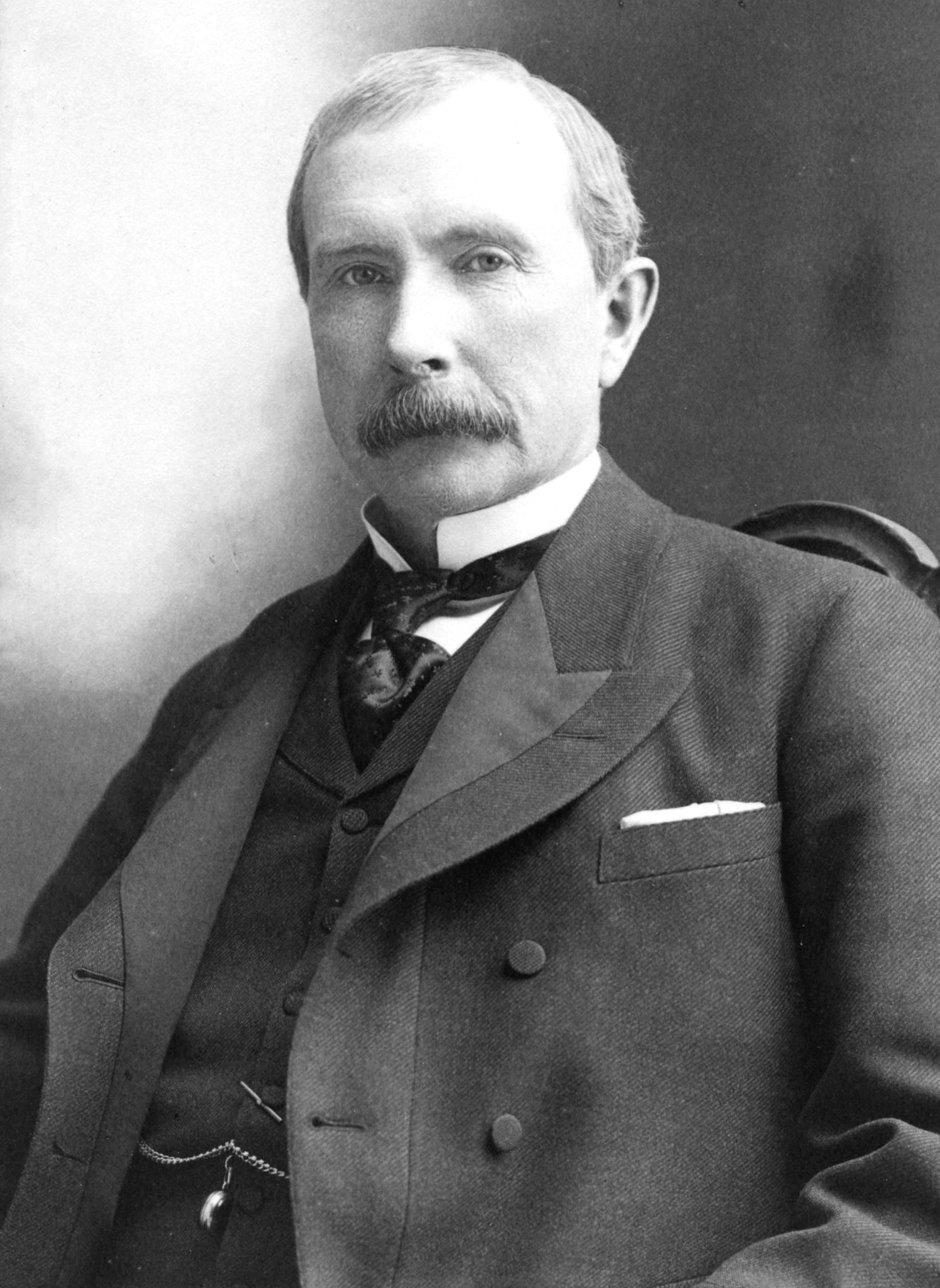
John D. Rockefeller, who seized Corrigan's stock in Standard Oil as repayment for debt, and whom Corrigan unsuccessfully sued for fraud

The Panic of 1893 created serious financial illiquidity for Corrigan. Pressed for cash to pay the loans on the ships he had purchased, Corrigan turned to John D. Rockefeller, the largest shareholder in Standard Oil. Rockefeller was one of the nation's richest men, and a fellow Clevelander. Rockefeller loaned Corrigan the $400,000 ($14,300,000 in 2025 dollars) he needed to pay the loans. The Rockefeller note was secured by Corrigan's Standard Oil stock. (Note: Corrigan tried to borrow another $150,000 from John D. Rockefeller in October 1894, this time offering no collateral. Rockefeller declined to give the loan.)

Corrigan asked Rockefeller to release his stock, arguing that he could use his ships as collateral. Rockefeller refused. Corrigan stopped making interest payments on the loan in 1894. Rockefeller did not immediately foreclose, but allowed interest to accumulate. Rockefeller now offered to buy Corrigan's Standard Oil stock. He offered $168 a share, which would pay the outstanding interest and retire the principal.

Corrigan tentatively agreed, but only if Standard Oil gave him detailed information about the trust's assets, earnings, investments, and securities purchases for the past five years. This would allow him to determine if Rockefeller offered a fair price. At the time, almost no corporations released such sensitive information, and Rockefeller refused the request.

John asked his brother, Frank, to pressure Corrigan to sell. Corrigan finally did so in February 1895, at $168 a share. It was higher than the market price, and it was the price Rockefeller had offered other friends for their Standard Oil stock. A month later, the stock price rose to $185. Corrigan assumed he'd been swindled, and wrote a letter to Rockefeller in April accusing him of fraud.

Corrigan sued Rockefeller in July 1897, claiming Rockefeller had deliberately under-valued the stock. (Note: By this time, Standard Oil stock was worth $350 a share.) The men agreed to arbitration. Rockefeller gave the group of arbitrators full access to Standard Oil's confidential financial information. In April 1899, the board of arbitrators ruled in Rockefeller's favor.

Corrigan refused to accept the arbitration report, and resumed his lawsuit. A trial was held in April 1900, and the court of common pleas ruled against Corrigan in September. Corrigan appealed the court's ruling in January 1901. The appellate court affirmed the lower court ruling.

Corrigan then took his case to the Supreme Court of Ohio in November 1902. The high court reaffirmed the decision of the lower courts, concluding that where a trial occurs pursuant to an arbitrator's award, the court's award is binding upon the parties absent evidence of fraud or a mistake that essentially perpetrates a fraud. The case was likely the first in the United States to address whether an arbitrator's testimony could be used in court to impeach an award.

=== Hopkins Steamship, Corrigan Transit, and Wickliffe Transit ===
Once the depression caused by the Panic of 1890 had eased, Corrigan began purchasing ships again. He became part-owner, with his brother John, in 1891 of the $7,000, small steam-powered propeller barge Samuel Neff, and in 1892 James bought the schooner J.I. Case. (Note: The Samuel Neff burned while docked at Pelee Island, Ontario, in 1899.) Corrigan formed his third shipping fleet in 1893. With Mark Hopkins, John Green, John Mitchell, John F. Wedow, and F.W. Wheeler, he invested in and co-founded the Michigan-based Hopkins Steamship Company. Hopkins and Wheeler co-funded the $200,000 (equivalent to $6,227,000 in 2024) steel hulled steamship Centurion, which formed the nucleus of the new fleet. Corrigan sold his interest in Hopkins Steamship in 1896.

Corrigan also founded Corrigan Transit (also known as the James Corrigan Transportation Co.) in 1893. Corrigan had personally held title to all his vessels; now, he transferred title to all of them to Corrigan Transit. By 1900, the company had 12 vessels.

In March 1900, Corrigan incorporated the Wickliffe Transit Company and transferred the wooden-hulled steamer SS Robert Wallace to it.

=== Formation of the Lake Carriers Association ===
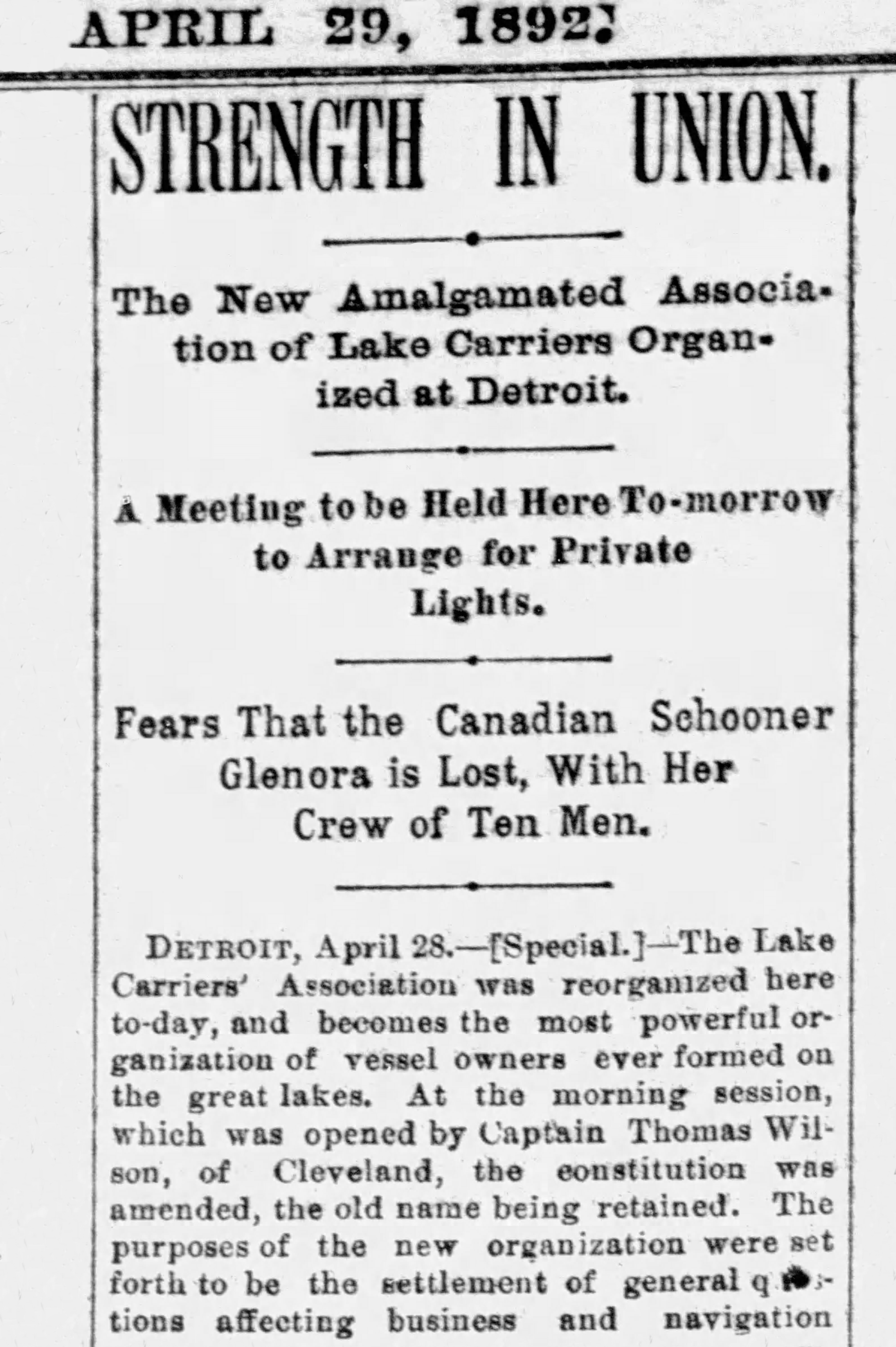
Corrigan was instrumental in forming the Lake Carriers Association in 1892

There were several local associations representing vessel owners on the Great Lakes in the 1880s and 1890s.

By 1892, many Cleveland area owners felt that a regional association would be more effective in advocating for federal and state funds to improve shipping conditions. Corrigan and Morris A. Bradley, owner of Bradley Transportation (a major Great Lakes fleet as well as shipbuilder), proposed that the Cleveland Vessel Owners' Association merge with the Buffalo, New York-based Lake Carriers Association The CVOA appointed a committee of its members in March 1892 to effect a merger, and Corrigan was named to that committee. Largely through Corrigan's influence, the consolidation occurred.

Corrigan joined the Lake Carriers Association on April 16, 1892, and the two organizations merged on April 28. Corrigan was elected to the LCA's first board of directors.

Corrigan was elected a vice president of the LCA in January 1893, and president in January 1894.

=== "Ice clause" lawsuit ===
In April 1898, the Corrigan, Huntington & Co. consort Northwest sank after striking heavy ice in the Straits of Mackinac, a short, narrow waterway between the U.S. state of Michigan's Upper and Lower Peninsulas.

At the time, nearly all vessel insurance policies carried a standard "ice clause" which held insurers not liable for paying damage caused by ice. The clause read: "Warranted free from claims or damage incurred while navigating, when such loss or damage is sustained or cause by, or in consequence of ice, unless the ship hereby insured be specifically and sufficiently protected and fitted, so as to enable her to encounter ice."

James Corrigan sought $18,000 (equivalent to $526,000 in 2024) from the Chicago Insurance Co. for the loss of the Northwest. When the company denied the claim, Corrigan sued in the Ohio Court of Common Pleas. His attorney, Harvey D. Goulder of Cleveland, argued that company's insurance policy was a standard, printed form which contained some provisions which applied to steamers, others to consorts, and others to both. The policy must be applied to the subject of the insurance. Since it was common knowledge that consorts were never clad with metal to allow them to cut through ice, the "ice clause" could not be applied to the Northwest. Even if it was, Goulder asserted, no fitting would have protected against an ice strike so far below the water line.

A jury trial was held, and the jury ruled that the "ice clause" invalid as applied to consorts. Corrigan was awarded $10,434 in damages (equivalent to $305,000 in 2024).

The outcome was an important one, as it invalidated the "ice clause" in the state of Ohio.

== Mining and smelting ==
=== Early mine investments ===
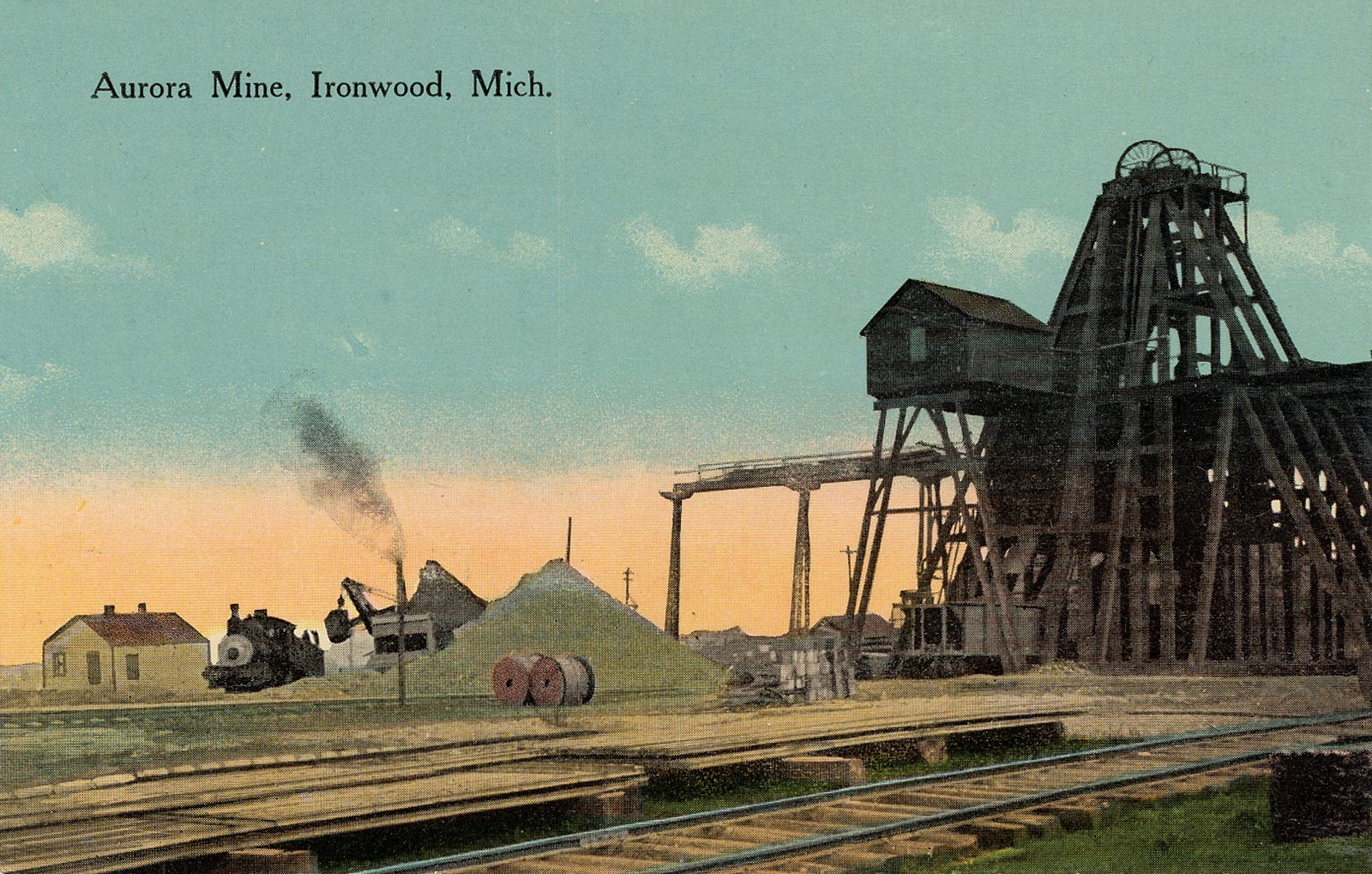
The Aurora Mine about 1910

Having engaged in the transportation of coal and iron ore for some years, Corrigan decided to begin mining operations on his own. His first venture in this area appears to have been the Duluth Lime & Coal Company. Based in Duluth, Minnesota, which he co-founded in April 1886 with John Corrigan and six other Cleveland investors.

Some time in 1886 or early 1887, Corrigan traded his family farm in Minnesota to George E. Tarbell of Milwaukee, Wisconsin, for $30,000 (equivalent to $916,000 in 2024) in stock in mines on the Gogebic Range owned by John E. Burton. The stock collapsed due to the 1887–1888 recession. Corrigan claimed that the stock was worthless even before the recession, and that Tarbell knew it. Corrigan sued Tarbell for fraud, and the lawsuit was heard by a jury in July 1887. After a two week trial and the testimony of 50 witnesses, the jury found in favor of Tarbell.

At about the same time, Corrigan began founding companies to mine iron ore. With co-investor and Standard Oil co-founder Stephen V. Harkness, he incorporated the Iron Belt Mining Company in March 1887. (Note: Other investors in the company appear to be David A. Dangler, Louis Severance, Feargus B. Squire, and Henry S. Whittlesey, all wealthy Cleveland area businessmen.) With Harkness as president and Corrigan as vice-president, the firm leased the Iron Belt Mine on section 11 of the Gogebic Range (near Iron Belt, Wisconsin) for 20 years. (Note: The Iron Belt Mining Co. sold the mine to the Wisconsin Central Railroad in December 1889 for $150,000 (equivalent to $4,729,000 in 2024).) With Nat D. Moore, Standard Oil co-founder Daniel M. Harkness, Standard Oil executive John L. Severance, gas stove manufacturer David A. Dangler, and several others, he formed a syndicate (the Eureka Iron Mining Company) to purchase the Portage Lake Mine and the Ryan Mine near Hurley, Wisconsin. The Portage Lake Mine was renamed the Dangler Mine, and a major ore strike made there in September 1889. (Note: The Dangler was later renamed the Eureka Mine. The Eureka mine played out in 1895. It never reopened, and the company was dissolved in 1902.)

His third mining investment came in November 1887, when he, Cleveland railroad magnate Stevenson Burke, and merchant Franklin T. Ives founded the Aurora Mining Company. With Burke as president and Corrigan as a director, it purchased the Aurora Mine, located on the Gogebic Range near Ironwood, Michigan, from Nat D. Moore, Henry S. Benjamin, and Francis A. Bates. Corrigan was elected vice-president of the firm in January 1889. (Note: The Aurora Mining Co. changed its name to Penokee & Gogebic Development Co. in 1888, and the mine was sold in 1899.)

He became a member of the Western Iron Ore Association, an organization of iron ore producers west of the Allegheny Mountains, and by 1892 Corrigan's mining interests on the Gogebic Range were called "immense" by the Duluth News Tribune.

=== Mine investments with Frank Rockefeller ===
Frank Rockefeller

James Corrigan first associated with Frank Rockefeller, a Standard Oil executive and brother of John D. Rockefeller, in 1892. The two men had similar personalities: Assertive, breezy, daring, and at times reckless. They became good friends. Both were also interested in iron mining, and in November 1892 they jointly visited the Iron Belt Mine on the Gogebic Range in northern Wisconsin, a famously productive mine which had opened in 1887. The two then visited the Franklin and New England mines on the Mesabi Range of Minnesota in April 1893. Their interest piqued, they inspected the Franklin, Iron King, and New England mines in October. The two purchased an interest (Note: Probably one-third, as W.C. Yawkey owned two-thirds.) in the New England Mine (renaming it Commodore) in June 1893 (Note: The land on which the Commodore was located was owned by the C.N. Nelson Lumber Co. or W.C. Yawkey (or perhaps jointly). A.E. Humphreys and his associates secured a lease on the lands, which already showed outcroppings of iron ore, and explored them in 1891 and 1892. They formed the New England Iron Company to mine the property, but lacked the capital to do so. New England Iron leased the mine to James Corrigan on November 11, 1892. Corrigan, Ives & Co. — and, later, its successor, Corrigan, McKinney & Co. — operated the mine. In June 1893, the mine's owner, the C.N. Nelson Lumber Co., sold the mine to Corrigan and Rockefeller.) and the Franklin Mine the first week of November 1893. (Note: The Franklin was adjacent to the Commodore. W.C. Yawkey owned a large interest in the Franklin Mine as well.) At the end of November, they formed the Franklin Iron Mining Co. to operate the Franklin Mine, (Note: The two men were not equal partners, as Frank Rockefeller owned a controlling interest in the Franklin Iron Mining Co. Author Ron Chernow claims Corrigan financed his share of the Franklin Iron Mining Co. by mortgaging his shares of Standard Oil. To whom is not clear in Chernow's text. The Virginia Enterprise and The Plain Dealer newspapers reported that two mortgages on the Franklin Mine were held by John D. Rockefeller. As Corrigan had lost his stock by 1899, this indicates Corrigan's loans from John D. Rockefeller were backed by the mine itself.) and Corrigan (along with Franklin T. Ives, Stevenson Burke, Price McKinney, and Ernest T. Laydon) incorporated the Commodore Mining Co. to run the Commodore Mine. The same year, the Franklin Iron Mining Co. obtained a short-term lease on the Bessemer Mine, east of the Franklin Mine. (Note: The lease on the Bessemer Mine was turned over to the Oliver Mining Co. in April 1898.)

The two investors also purchased land (Note: Located at northwest and southwest quarter, section 30, township 58, range 17 west near Eveleth, Minnesota.) in 1893 which they called the Victoria Mine. It never produced ore, and was sold in 1898.

Corrigan and Rockefeller obtained options on section 25, township 59 north, range 17 west and section 35, township 58 north, range 17 west from W.C. Yawkey, the Detroit businessman who owned the Bessemer mine. They began exploring these 440 acres (180 ha) of land in June 1895, but found nothing and abandoned this work in August. After abandoning the Yawkey lands, Rockefeller and Corrigan secured a lease on the "Williams 40", (Note: A 40-acre (16 ha) parcel of land owned by a man named Williams.) a parcel which was once part of the Cincinnati Mine. (Note: The Cincinnati Mine was located on the northwest corner of the southwest quarter of the northeast quarter of section 2, township 58, range 16 west. The first marketable iron ore on the Mesabi Range was found there in 1891. The Williams 40 had once been leased to the operators of the Cincinnati Mine, but owner John M. Williams canceled the lease.)

In late September 1895, Corrigan and Rockefeller leased the Zenith (Note: The Zenith Mine was located on the northern half of the southeast quarter of section 27, township 63, range 12 west in Minnesota.) and Pioneer (Note: The Pioneer Mine was located on the southwest quarter of section 27, township 63, range 12 west in Minnesota.) mines. These were the first investments by the two on the Vermilion Range. (Note: They surrendered the leases on these mines in April 1898 as unprofitable.) The two men sought to lease the Sibley and Berringer lands which adjoined the Zenith Mine, but were not successful. (Note: The Zenith Mining Co. had formed in 1891. It was reorganized in 1895, which is when Corrigan and Rockefeller invested in and took control of it.)

== Ore dealing ==
=== Dalliba, Hussey and Co. ===
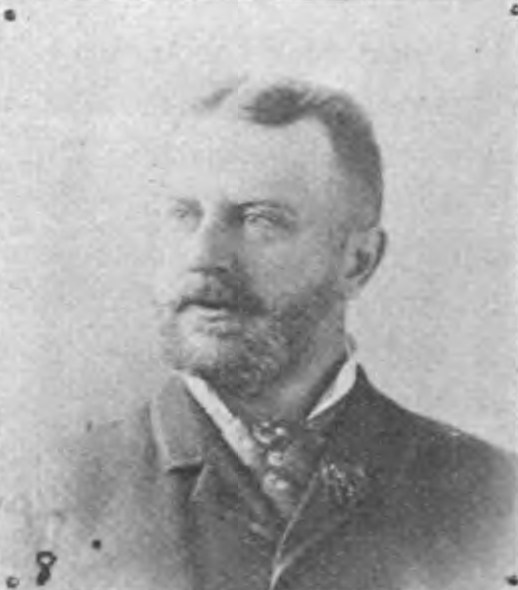
James Dalliba in 1895

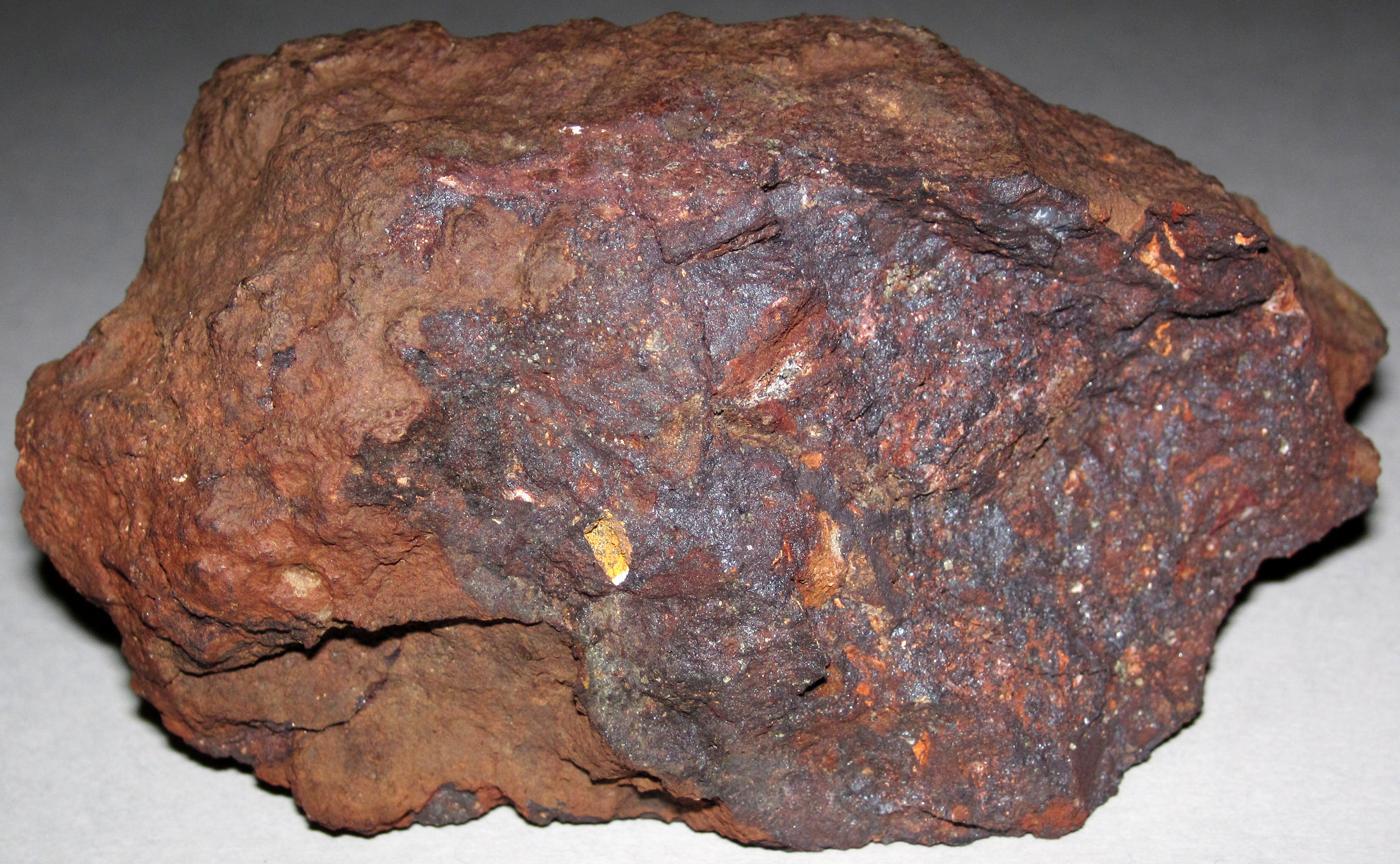
Iron ore from Minnesota

Dalliba, Hussey & Co. was founded in January 1887 by James H. Dalliba (a veteran mine operator), Horace P. Hussey (of the stock brokerage firm Hussey, Hoyt & Co.), and the firm of Moore, Benjamin & Co. (a developer of iron mines on the Gogebic Range). (Note: James H. Dalliba was also a partner in Moore, Benjamin & Co.) Dalliba, Hussey & Co. sold the output of five mines on the Gogebic Range, and a single mine on the Marquette Range and the Menominee Range. All the mines were controlled by Moore, Benjamin & Co.

Dalliba, Hussey often advanced sums of money, sometimes quite large, to buyers of ore. This put a financial strain on the company, and in summer 1887 Nat D. Moore of Moore, Benjamin & Co. suggested that Dalliba, Hussey seek an investor who could add capital to the firm. James Dalliba agreed, and Hussey, Hoyt & Co. recruited James Corrigan. Moore sold his interest in Dalliba, Hussey & Co. to Corrigan for $30,000 (equivalent to $916,000 in 2024). Corrigan joined the firm as partner on August 12, 1887. The new partnership was to use the same name as the old, last for three years, and assume all assets and liabilities of the old firm.

Moore, Benjamin & Co. failed on November 15, 1887, and Dalliba, Hussey & Co. went into liquidation in February 1888.

Corrigan formed a new company in March 1888 to take up the business of the old, operating under the name Dalliba, Corrigan & Co. Stevenson Burke was an investor in the new partnership, which by agreement also lasted three years. In August 1888, the current and former investors in Dalliba, Hussey & Co. sued the Atlantic Mining Co. for failure to deliver iron ore. They won the case, and were awarded a part-interest in the lease the company held on the Atlantic Mine near Hurley, Wisconsin. (Note: Corrigan, McKinney & Co. obtained the entire lease to the Atlantic Mine on June 1, 1895. Two years later, the firm leased the northwest quarter of section 12 from Tilden Iron Mining Co. to obtain the rest of the ore vein. The Atlantic Mine was sold to the Oliver Mining Co. in 1902, at which time Corrigan, McKinney surrendered its lease.)

Dalliba, Corrigan & Co. dissolved in 1891, and James Corrigan formed a new iron dealership with Franklin T. Ives under the name Corrigan, Ives & Co. James Dalliba worked as a salesman for Corrigan, Ives until January 1, 1892. Dalliba, Corrigan & Co. never paid James H. Dalliba his share of the now-defunct partnership.

Two weeks after James Dalliba left, James Corrigan sued him and Horace T. Hussey for fraud. He claimed that the two men had lied about the financial status of Dalliba, Hussey & Co., and that Dalliba had withdrawn large sums of cash from the firm for personal use. Corrigan asked for $41,000 in damages (equivalent to $1,277,000 in 2024). Dalliba counter-sued, arguing that Corrigan, Ives & Co. owed him $5,724 (equivalent to $178,000 in 2024) in unpaid commissions. He also sued James Corrigan, Franklin T. Ives, and Stevenson Burke for $8,184 (equivalent to $255,000 in 2024) to obtain his share of the dissolved partnership. (Note: The counter-suits wound their way through the courts for several years, but their outcome is not known.)

The Ohio Court of Common Pleas heard Corrigan's suit, and on June 10, 1892, ruled against Corrigan. The judge found that James Corrigan had discovered the irregularity in the books in November 1887. There was a four-year statute of limitations for the firm to recover the funds, and Corrigan had filed his lawsuit too late. The court also held that representations about Dalliba, Hussey & Co.'s financial viability were all made by the firm of Moore, Benjamin & Co. — not by Dalliba or Hussey, or their corporations. The court did not need to address whether fraud had occurred, as Corrigan had not sued Moore, Benjamin & Co.

James Corrigan filed an appeal in July 1892, but a state appellate court affirmed the lower court ruling in December 1892.

James H. Dalliba and Horace P. Hussey each sued James Corrigan for $50,000 in damages (equivalent to $1,557,000 in 2024). Corrigan had obtained a preliminary attachment on the property and cash of both men, and a garnishment on Dalliba's wages. Each man argued that the attachment had libeled them and done permanent harm to their business and personal reputations. Dalliba also sued Corrigan, Ives & Co. to recover $2,250 in garnished wages.

Dalliba's libel suit was dismissed by the court of common pleas in March 1893, and Hussey and Corrigan settled out of court in June 1894.

=== Standard Ore ===
Standard Ore was a mine operating company established in Duluth in August 1892 by Henry W. Oliver, Chester A. Congdon, Francis A. Bates, and others. It operated the Cincinnati Mine near Biwabik, Minnesota, and the Missabe Mountain Mine near Virginia, Minnesota, among others. In October 1892, Stevenson Burke was elected president of the company.

Given Burke's partnership in Corrigan, Ives & Co., it is unsurprising that Standard Ore immediately signed a contract that gave Corrigan, Ives the exclusive right to market their iron ore for five years. It made Corrigan, Ives & Co. one of the largest iron ore dealers in the nation.

By April 1893, James Corrigan was a stockholder in Standard Ore.

== Corrigan, Ives and Co. ==
James Corrigan founded the firm of Corrigan, Ives & Co. in January 1891. Franklin T. Ives and Stevenson Burke were partners in the company. Iron ore dealer H.P. Lillibridge was also a partner, but he withdrew from the firm shortly after it was created.

Corrigan, Ives & Co. marketed ore from the Aurora, Atlantic, Crystal Falls, Buffalo, Cambria, Commodore, Dunn, Eureka, Lallie, Mansfield, Sunday Lake, Armenia, Claire, Franklin, Iron Belt, Lucy, Pewabic, Sunday Lake, Millie, Pearce, Peninsula, Sterling, Prince of Wales, Queen, and South Buffalo mines. (Note: The Plain Dealer newspaper in Cleveland said Corrigan, Ives operated the Mansfield Mine at Crystal Lake, Michigan, for Ferdinand Schlesinger, but Corrigan, Ives denied that.) It quickly became one of the nation's leading iron ore and pig iron dealers, and James Corrigan made a million dollars.

The Panic of 1893 began in February 1893, and bankrupted Corrigan, Ives & Co. The company had sold large amounts of iron ore to iron foundries and blast furnaces, but when the panic hit these companies failed to pay for the ore. The company tried to stay afloat by issuing more than $1 million (equivalent to $31,136,000 in 2024) in notes, which were purchased by Ferdinand Schlesinger, a Milwaukee businessman who owned numerous mines. (Note: Schlesinger owned the Aragon, Armenia, Buffalo, Chapin, Claire, Dunn, Prince of Wales, Queen, and Sunday mines as well as the York Iron Co.) (Corrigan, Ives was the sales agent for almost all of Schlesinger's mines.)

=== Receivership ===
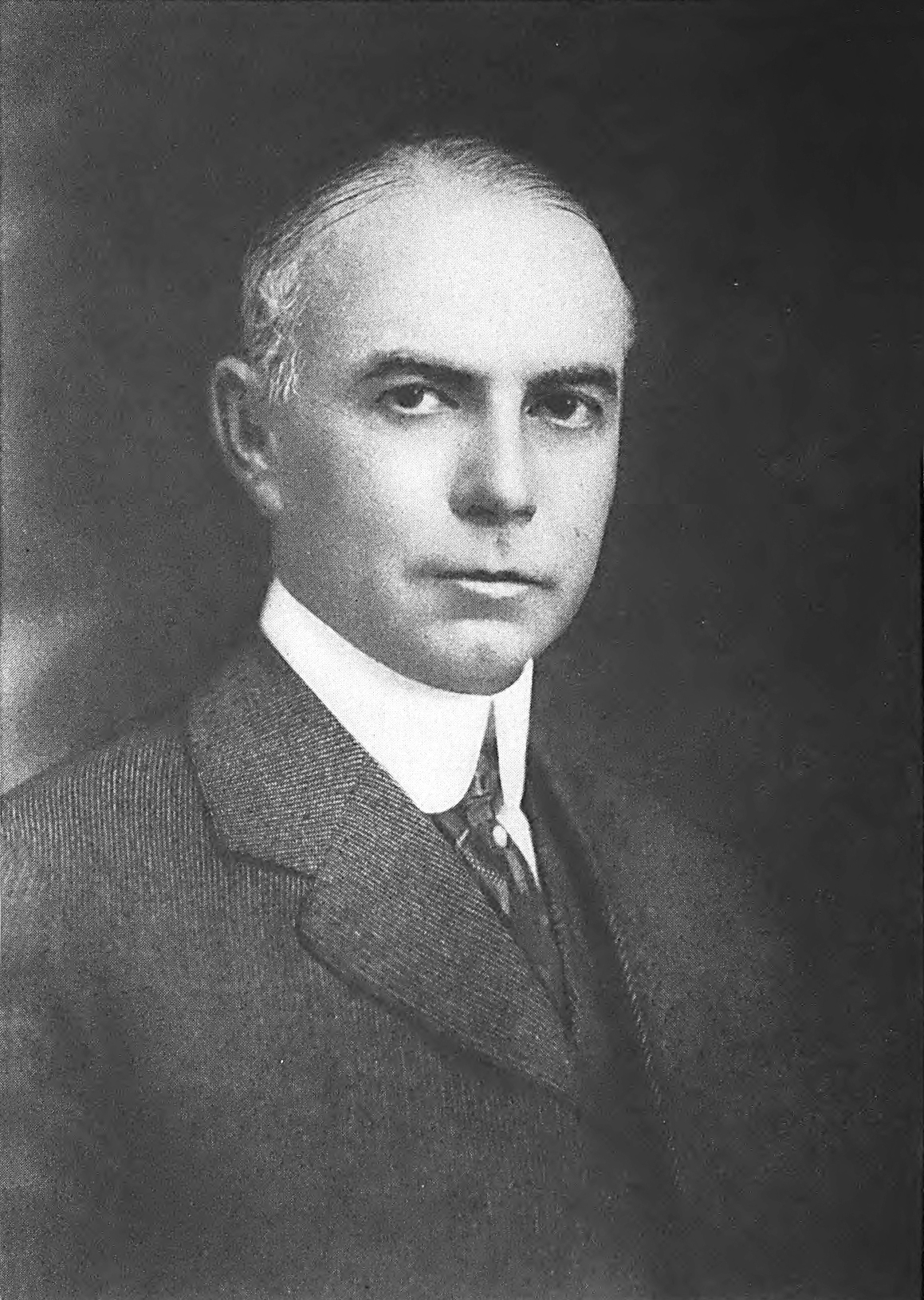
Price McKinney

In early July 1893, Stevenson Burke asked an Ohio state court to appoint a receiver. Burke claimed that $100,000 (equivalent to $3,114,000 in 2024) had been withdrawn from the business by Corrigan for personal reasons. The court agreed, and appointed Price McKinney (Burke's son-in-law) receiver on July 8.

Corrigan apparently tried to bring Corrigan, Ives & Co. out of receivership almost immediately. In mid-July, he traveled to Milwaukee, where several banks had issued loans to Corrigan, Ives & Co. (Note: One news report said Milwaukee banks held $2 million in notes issued by Ferdinand Schlesinger and Corrigan, Ives & Co., although the amount loaned to each was not stated.) He asked the banks to settle the debts for 75 cents on the dollar, but none of the banks were willing to do so.

The receiver's first report to the court was a positive one. McKinney did not find any money missing, but did discover that Corrigan, Ives had failed to pay freight charges for ore it sold in June 1893. This seemed to have been because Corrigan, Ives had advanced $270,000 (equivalent to $8,687,000 in 2024) to Schlesinger to allow him to pay railroad freight charges. Schlesinger had not paid the company back, causing Corrigan, Ives significant liquidity problems.

=== Operations during receivership ===
The Ohio court permitted Corrigan, Ives & Co. to reorganize under McKinney, rather than force a liquidation. The partnership suffered some financial difficulties during this time. A riot occurred at the Franklin Mine when Corrigan, Ives failed to pay wages on time there, and it closed the Commodore and Franklin mines in August 1893.

On the whole, though, Corrigan, Ives & Co. was making money during the receivership. It purchased the leases on the Buffalo Mine and Queen Mine on Michigan's Marquette Iron Range for $400,000 in January 1894, (Note: The Prince of Wales Mine was located on the same property as the Queen, as were the Buffalo and South Buffalo. Together, they made up the "Queen group".) (Note: Buffalo Mining held a number of leases, including the Buffalo, Queen, and South Buffalo. All the leases held by Buffalo Mining were sold at auction to pay debts.) (Note: Corrigan, Ives & Co. had advanced large sums of money to Ferdinand Schlesinger and his Buffalo Mining Co., which had the leases on the two mines. The mines were owned by Mary Breitung, doing business as the Arctic Iron Co. Corrigan, Ives paid Buffalo Mining Co. $353,511 (equivalent to $11,433,000 in 2024) for the leases, $85,089 (equivalent to $2,752,000 in 2024) for its mining equipment, and $1,000 (equivalent to $32,000 in 2024) for ore already mined.) and purchased the Sunday Lake Mine in February 1894. (Note: Corrigan, Ives won a court judgment against the bankrupt Sunday Lake & Gogebic Co. It then purchased the Sunday Lake Mine at a sheriff's sale.) Corrigan, McKinney & Co. assumed ownership of the Buffalo Mining Co., reorganized it, and assigned it as the operator of the Buffalo Mine.

By August 1893, most of the Milwaukee creditors had come to an agreement on settling the company's debts. On August 16, the Wisconsin Marine & Fire Insurance Bank agreed to accept a shipment of iron ore to redeem $164,925 (equivalent to $5,135,000 in 2024) in loans the firm had obtained from it.

The Commercial Bank of Milwaukee claimed it had loaned Corrigan, Ives & Co. $134,894 (equivalent to $4,200,000 in 2024). McKinney denied owing the bank any money. The Commercial Bank sued, and in April 1896 won in a local Minnesota court. The Wisconsin Supreme Court overturned the ruling and ordered the case dismissed in February 1897.

=== Gold and silver mines ===
In April 1895, bankrupt Wisconsin mine owner Ferdinand Schlesinger was forced to sell most of his properties. He sold his El Concheno gold and silver mine in the Mexican state of Chihuahua to James Corrigan, Stevenson Burke, and Price McKinney. Corrigan funded the construction of a railroad spur to the mine, and added crushers and a mill. He sold the mine in December 1906 for $1,000,000 ($35,800,000 in 2025 dollars).

Corrigan was also an investor in the Ohio Mining Co. In January 1900, that company opened a gold mine in Elizabethtown, New Mexico.

== Corrigan, McKinney and Co. ==
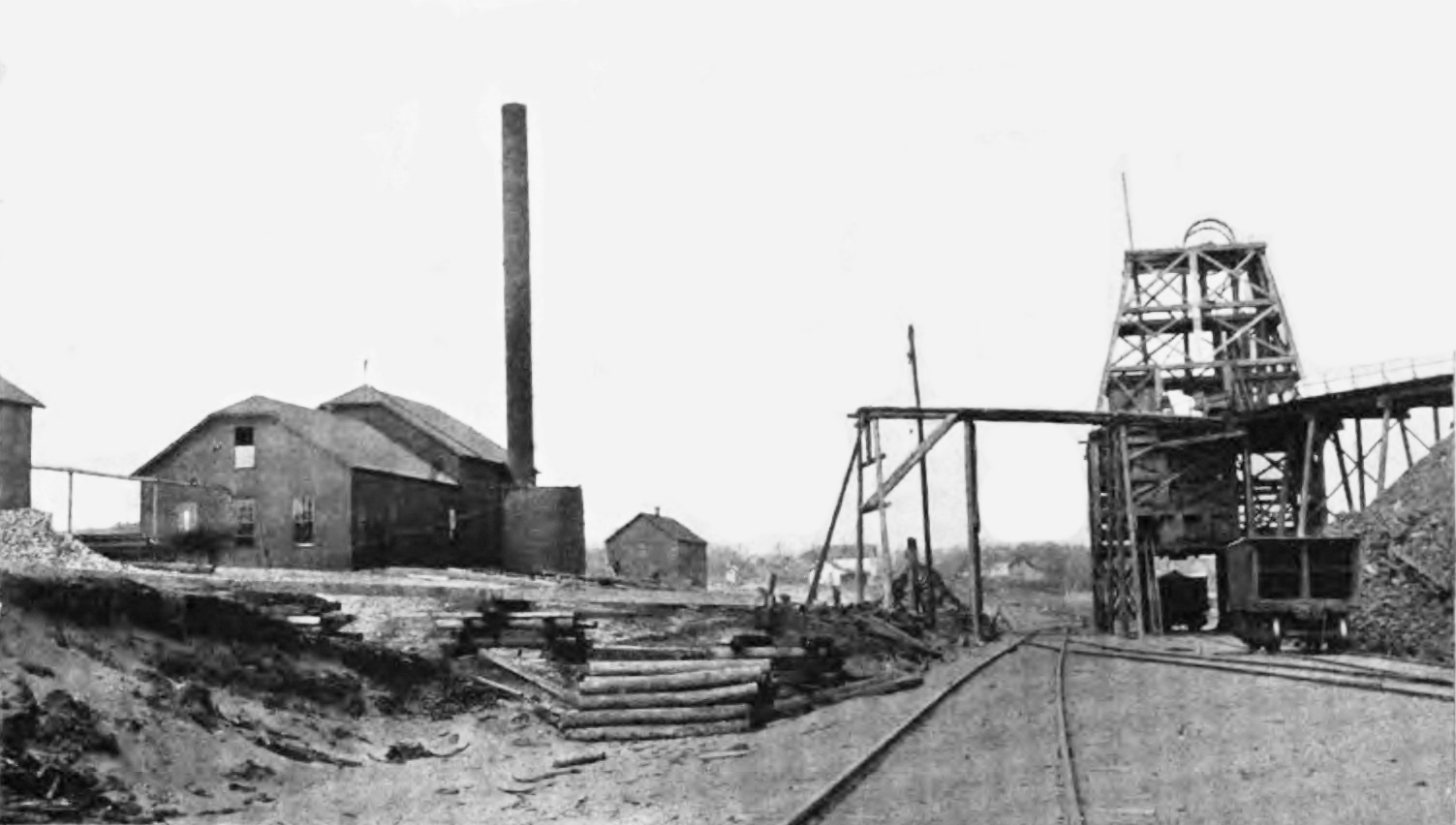
The Great Western Mine

Corrigan, Ives & Co. was reorganized as Corrigan, McKinney & Co. on March 15, 1894. Franklin T. Ives left the firm, and Price McKinney joined as a partner.

Four days after the organization, James Corrigan, Stevenson Burke, Price McKinney, and two other investors incorporated the Sunday Lake Mining Co. to operate that mine on behalf of Corrigan, McKinney. The five also incorporated the Queen Iron Mining Co., with a capital of $500,000, to operate the Queen, Buffalo, South Buffalo, and Prince of Wales mines on behalf of Corrigan, McKinney.

In September 1895, the company leased the Bessemer, Commodore, and Victoria mines from James Corrigan and Franklin Rockefeller.

In January 1898, Ferdinand Schlesinger agreed to stop operating the Crystal Falls Mine in favor of a new corporation. This was the Crystal Falls Iron Mining Co., whose primary investors were James Corrigan, Stevenson Burke, Price McKinney, and S.C. Bennett. Two months later, Corrigan initiated a campaign to have railroads in Minnesota lower their freight charges for ore. The fees, he claimed, were so high that most of his mines were losing money, and he would shut them down if rates did not fall. Subsequently, in April Corrigan sold his interest in the Franklin Mine. (Note: Pressed by John D. Rockefeller for payment of loans, Corrigan and Franklin sold their interest in the Franklin Mine in 1898 for a quarter of the mine's value. News reports vary as to who purchased the mine, either the Oliver Mining Co. the Republic Iron & Steel Co., or Cleveland broker James Hoyt as a representative for the Lake Superior Consolidated Mines. The Franklin was the last property Frank Rockefeller owned on the Mesabi Range.)

Corrigan, McKinney purchased the Lincoln Mine (Menominee Range) near Crystal Falls, Michigan, in July, and the Great Western Mine (adjacent to the Lincoln) in October. Both the Great Western and the Lincoln were initially operated by the Crystal Falls Mining Co. In May 1899, Corrigan, Burke, McKinney, Samuel C. Bennett, and A.L. Flewelling established the Great Western Mining Co. and the Lincoln Mining Co. to operate them.

By the end of 1900, U.S. Steel was far and away the largest producer of iron ore in the Great Lakes region. The only large independent producers were Corrigan, McKinney & Co., Cleveland Cliffs Iron, and John D. Rockefeller's Lake Superior Consolidated Mines.

Corrigan's personal involvement in mining came to an end in 1903. In February 1902, Minnesota land and mine owner Edmund J. Longyear leased the northwest quarter of the southeast quarter of section 16, township 47, range 46 west to Corrigan, McKinney & Co. for five years. Longyear leased the northwest half of the southwest quarter of section 23, township 57, range 22 west (about 120 acres (49 ha)) to the company in January 1903. The company struck a large iron ore deposit the Longyear properties, and named it the St. Paul Mine. In April 1903, James Corrigan, Price McKinney and J.E. Ferris together assembled $100,000 ($3,600,000 in 2025 dollars) and created the St. Paul Iron Mining Co. Corrigan, McKinney duly leased its new mine to St. Paul Iron Mining, which operated the new concern.

== Smelting ==
By 1905, Corrigan, McKinney & Co. owned one of the largest group of blast furnaces in the country. Even though the company was the second largest shipper of iron ore (only U.S. Steel was larger), it still had to purchase ore from other mines and dealers to keep its furnaces going. James Corrigan's personal investments in the smelting industry dovetailed with those of Corrigan, McKinney.

=== River Furnace ===
Corrigan, McKinney & Co. moved into the manufacture of pig iron in 1894. In June of that year, it leased the River Furnace (Note: "Furnace" is short for blast furnace.) of the Cleveland Iron Company. This blast furance was located on Cleveland, Ohio's Scranton Peninsula in an area bounded by Girard St. in the south, Carter Rd. in the east, the tracks of the Cleveland, Cincinnati, Chicago and St. Louis Railway to the north, and the Cuyahoga River on the west. Corrigan, McKinney immediately began work on repairing and improving the furnace's coal receiving docks. The furnace was blown in (Note: "Blown in" means to heat the furnace in preparation for the smelting of iron.) about August 10. The River Furnace had an annual capacity of about 220 short tons (200 t) a day.

James Corrigan, Stevenson Burke, Earnest T. Laundon, C.W. Marsh, and Price McKinney incorporated the River Furnace and Dock Co. to operate the River Furnace on March 6, 1895.

The River Furnace and Dock Co. and Corrigan, McKinney & Co. relinquished the lease on the River Furnace in August 1907.

=== Charlotte Furnace ===
Corrigan, McKinney & Co. obtained its second blast furnace in 1895.

The Charlotte Furnace was built in Scottdale, Pennsylvania, in 1872 and 1873 by the National Pipe and Foundry Co. (later known as United States Cast Iron Pipe Co.). It had an annual capacity of 26,000 short tons (24,000 t). The Charlotte Furnace was idled in 1890.

In May 1895, Corrigan, McKinney & Co. leased the Charlotte Furnace for five years. The furnace was blown in on July 16. The Charlotte Furnace was blown out (Note: To "blow out" a blast furnace is to shut it down.) on November 10, 1895, after Corrigan, McKinney discovered it needed a general overhaul and new bosh. (Note: The "bosh" is that portion of the blast furnace above the tuyeres and below the stack. Shaped like an inverted, truncated cone, it is the part of the blast furnace where ore turns molten.) The Charlotte Furnace was blown in again in July 1896 with a new annual capacity of 70,000 short tons (64,000 t).

Corrigan, McKinney continued to operate the Charlotte Furnace until 1905. In June of that year, James Corrigan, Price McKinney, and Amos E. Gillespie incorporated the Scottdale Furnace Company. It had a capitalization of $50,000 ($1,800,000 in 2025 dollars). While Corrigan, McKinney & Co. retained the lease to the furnace, it was now independently operated by the Scottdale Furnace Co.

The Charlotte Furnace was shut down in December 1907. Corrigan, McKinney razed the existing structure, and built a new furnace capable of producing 100,000 short tons (91,000 t) annually. The new furnace began production in 1911, three years after James Corrigan died.

=== Douglas Furnace ===
Corrigan, McKinney & Co. obtained its third blast furnace in 1896.

The Douglas Furnace of Sharpsville, Pennsylvania, was built in 1870 and blown in about March 1871. It was built by investors James Pierce, Jonas J. Pierce, Wallace Pierce, and George D. Kelly (Note: James and Wallace Pierce, along with George Kelly, organized the firm of Pierce, Kelly & Co. and transferred their ownership shares to this company. Jonas J. Pierce remained an individual co-owner of the furnace.) and had an annual capacity of 60,000 short tons (54,000 t). The furnace was leased to Forsythe, Hyde & Co. of Chicago, Illinois, in August 1892.

In 1893, Forsythe, Hyde & Co. failed. That July, Corrigan, Ives & Co. secured a judgement against the Douglas Furnace in the amount of $105,000 ($3,800,000 in 2025 dollars). The Commercial Bank of Milwaukee also secured an attachment against the Douglas Furnace, and a court awarded it $130,000 ($4,700,000 in 2025 dollars) worth of pig iron produced by Forsythe, Hyde & Co. The sheriff of Mercer County, Pennsylvania, ignored the attachment, seized the pig iron, and it was sold. This caused the Commercial Bank of Milwaukee to fail. Corrigan, Ives & Co. went into receivership, and was sued by the Commercial Bank. The Douglas Furnace was seized by the Mercer County sheriff in September 1895. In lieu of payment, Corrigan, Ives & Co. (reorganized as Corrigan, McKinney & Co.) took over the lease on the Douglas Furnace, and began operating it on May 1, 1896.

The owners of the Douglas Furnace immediately sued Corrigan, McKinney & Co. in federal district court. They argued that the Cleveland firm had to pay rent on the furnace, as required by the lease. It had not, and they demanded $16,000 ($600,000 in 2025 dollars) in rent. The owners won their suit in May 1897. Corrigan, McKinney appealed, and a U.S. appellate court upheld the district court's ruling in October.

The Carnegie Steel Company purchased the Douglas Furnace in 1895. When Corrigan, McKinney's lease expired on May 7, 1898, Carnegie Steel declined to renew it and took over the Douglas Furnace itself.

=== Genesee Furnace ===
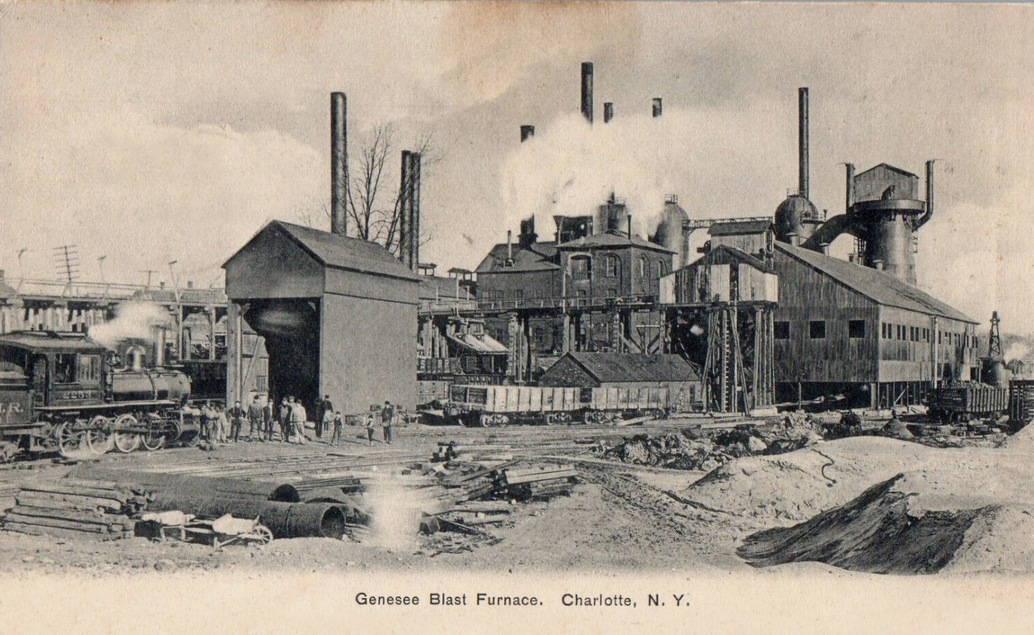
Genesee Furnace after its 1908 upgrades.

Corrigan, McKinney & Co. obtained its fourth blast furnace in 1902.

The Genesee Furnace was built in Charlotte, New York, in 1868 by the Charlotte Iron Works. It was rebuilt in 1884, and had an annual capacity of 20,000 short tons (18,000 t).

On June 4, 1902, Corrigan, McKinney & Co. purchased the Genesee Furnace. About $100,000 ($3,900,000 in 2025 dollars) was spent relining the furnace and erecting new stoves to increase the Charlotte's production to 200 short tons (180 t) per day. (Note: Exhaust from the blast furnace can be used to improve the efficiency of the furnace. First, dust is filtered from the exhaust. The exhaust is mixed with air, and burned in a large steel structure lined with fire brick. This structure is called the stove. Outside air can be passed through a heated stove, warming the air. This reduces the amount of fuel needed to smelt ore. At least two stoves are used, one to heat air and one to be pre-heated for use.) The company also purchased a limestone quarry near Le Roy, New York, and another at Gouverneur, New York, to provide limestone for smelting.

In September 1903, James Corrigan, Stevenson Burke, Price McKinney, and Joseph Hartley incorporated the Genesee Furnace Company to operate the furnace. It had a capitalization of $50,000 ($1,800,000 in 2025 dollars).

The Genesee Furnace Company shut the property down in early December 1903 to reline the furnace, install four new boilers, a fan engine (an engine with cylinders arranged radially) to power the injection of air, and new trestles for the dumping of coke and limestone. The improvements increased the furnace's capacity from 200 short tons (180 t) to 250 short tons (230 t) per day. The company also purchased two new locomotives to shift coke, limestone, and ore around the property. A new electrical plant was installed in the early spring of 1904. The cost of these improvements was $175,000 ($6,300,000 in 2025 dollars).

The blast furnace was shut again in late November 1904 for major upgrades. A second stack was added, doubling the daily capacity of the facility, and three new stoves added to provide hot air for smelting. To accommodate the much greater need for ore, the company began building a 300-foot (91 m) long dock on Lake Ontario. The cost of these improvements was $500,000 ($17,900,000 in 2025 dollars). The plant was shut down again on September 1, 1905, for a rebuild of the first stack, the installation of new ore and limestone elevators, and a general plant overhaul. The cost of these improvements was $66,000 ($2,400,000 in 2025 dollars). Smelting began again on January 1, 1906.

The Genesee Furnace Company shut the property down again on April 1, 1908. The old 1,500 horsepower (1,100 kW) boilers were replaced with new, 2,500 horsepower (1,900 kW) tube boilers. A new feed water heater and pumps were installed, and the furnaces relined. A new hoist, with more powerful engines designed by the Otis Elevator Co. of Chicago, was also erected. One of the stoves was converted into a three-pass "McClure" stove. The changes meant a 30 percent increase in daily capacity, to 325 short tons (295 t) per day. (Note: The three-pass, or McClure, stove brought heated air to the top of the furnace, so that a separate stack is not needed to get the air back to the top again. It also used the difference between atmospheric pressure and boiler pressure to move the air, eliminating the need for fans or pumps.) The Genesee Furnace was blown in again on August 9.

=== Josephine Furnace ===
Difficulties in obtaining a reliable supply of coke for its furnace led Corrigan, McKinney to set up its own coking facility. In February 1903, it purchased between 4,000 acres (1,600 ha) to 6,000 acres (2,400 ha) of coal-bearing land in Pennsylvania.

Arthur Gould Yates, president of the Buffalo, Rochester and Pittsburgh Railway (BR&P), persuaded James Corrigan and Price McKinney to locate its new coking facility on near the tiny village of Bell's Mills in Indiana County, Pennsylvania. Corrigan and McKinney decided on their own to build more than a coking facility. The day after the land purchase was announced, the company said it would construct a blast furnace at the place. The company began construction on 165 new houses for its workers and managers. The new town was named Josephine, after the wife of Corrigan, McKinney stockholder Edward Burke.

The Josephine Furnace was the first modern, coke-fired blast furnace in Western Pennsylvania. The Josephine Furnace Co. was incorporated by James Corrigan, Price McKinney, and five other investors in October 1905 to run the blast furnace and coking facility.

Corrigan and McKinney were so happy with the location that they announced construction of a second blast furnace, to cost $1 million ($34,600,000 in 2025 dollars), in April 1907. Corrigan did not live to see it completed. The furnace was finished in June 1910, and began operation in March 1911.

== Corrigan, McKinney Steel ==
The lease held by Corrigan, McKinney & Co. on Cleveland's River Furnace expired in August 1907. The company made public its decision not to renew it in December 1906.

Initially, James Corrigan and Price McKinney intended to build one or two new furnaces somewhere along the Cuyahoga River in Cleveland. In January 1907, their company began negotiating with the state of Ohio for a lease on 3 acres (1.2 ha) at the Weigh Lock, where the Ohio and Erie Canal began on the Cuyahoga River. (Note: An extremely narrow and tight oxbow, jutting eastward, existed in the Cuyahoga River where Corrigan, McKinney intended to build its new blast furnaces. The Jefferson Street Bend was the head of navigation until 1906. The mayoral administration of Tom L. Johnson cut through a small peninsula in 1906 and eliminated the Jefferson Street Bend, making the new head of navigation a tight bend at Dille Road, about 0.5 miles (0.80 km) upriver. The Johnson administration exchanged property with landowners D.R. Taylor and John Giesendorfer and used eminent domain to seize a portion of the Lithe and Lillian Stone properties (the peninsula). It planned to cut through the peninsula and create a wide turning basin using part of the old river channel. Johnson's administration began excavation in 1905, and used removed soil to fill in the old channel of the Cuyahoga River. Johnson also spent $275,000 ($9,500,000 in 2025 dollars) to dredge 1 mile (1.6 km) of the Cuyahoga River up to the bend. This dredged material was also used to fill in the old channel of the river. Before the work could be completed, Johnson lost re-election on November 3, 1909. Herman C. Baehr served only a single, two-year term as mayor of Cleveland, but he completed the new river channel and turning basin. The State of Ohio retained the 3 acres (1.2 ha) of the old channel, which was now reclaimed land.) The state leased only 2 acres (0.81 ha) at an annual cost of $1,221.60 ($42,211 in 2025 dollars), so Corrigan, McKinney purchased another 2.5 acres (1.0 ha) south of the state land in February 1907.

Some time later in 1907, Corrigan, McKinney & Co. executives decided that a simple pig iron blast furnace was not enough.

Corrigan, McKinney began negotiating with landowners on the west side of the Cuyahoga River between Houston Street on the north and Clark Avenue on the south, and by early July 1908 had secured land from the Cuyahoga River in the east to the Wheeling and Lake Erie Railroad and the Newburgh and South Shore Railroad in the west. It totaled 40 acres (16 ha).

On July 31, 1908, the company announced that it would build a much larger facility consisting of at least two pig iron blast furnaces and a steel plate mill capable of producing 200,000 short tons (180,000 t) a year. The cost of the plant would be at least $2.5 million ($89,600,000 in 2025 dollars).

Ground clearance and grading began on August 1, 1908, and Corrigan, McKinney believed the furnace and ore docks would be ready within a year. James Corrigan died in December 1908, and never saw his steel plant.

== Idler disaster ==
=== Love of yachting ===
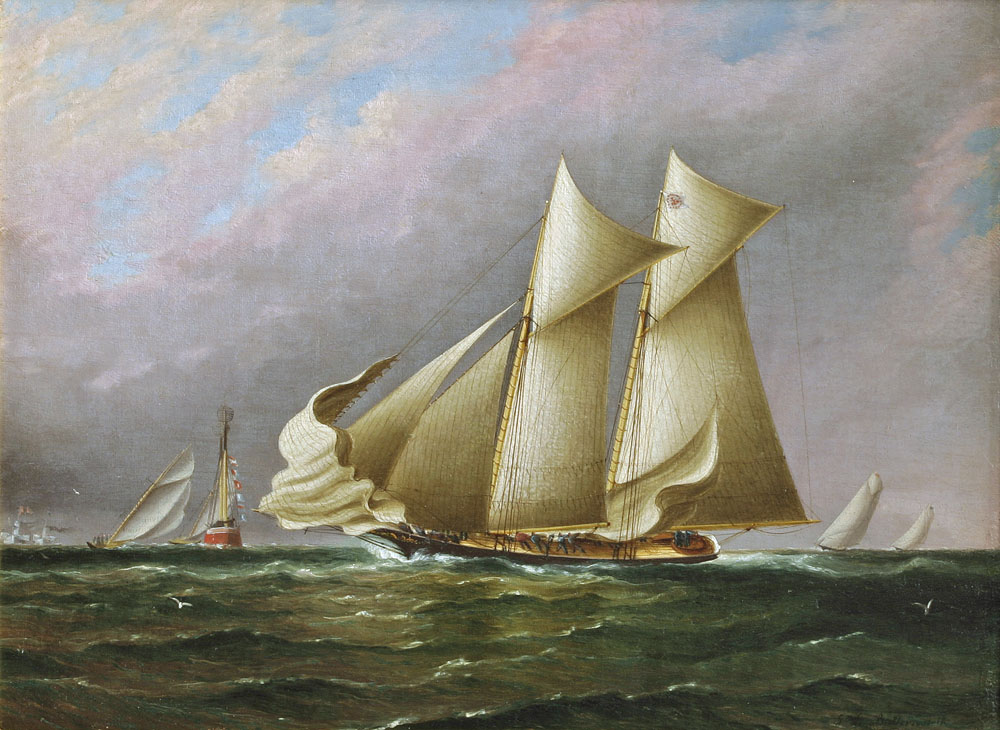
Schooner yacht Idler

James Corrigan was a lifelong avid yachtsman.

Among the many pleasure craft he owned at times were the schooner yacht Jane Anderson in 1878, the schooner yacht Flora in 1883, and the schooner yacht Wasp in 1892. Once, the Jane Anderson broke its anchor chain in a storm while anchored near the Canadian shoreline. Corrigan sailed the ship across Lake Erie in 60-mile-per-hour (97 km/h) winds. He arrived at Cleveland with the yacht on its beam end (side), but made it into the Cuyahoga River and safety to the astonishment of a large crowd.

Corrigan and local banker John P. Huntington jointly purchased the steam-powered propeller yacht Nautilus in 1888, and poured $15,000 ($537,500 in 2025 dollars) worth of improvements into her. Although Corrigan used the Nautilus extensively, he sold his interest in her in 1892 for $22,000 ($788,333 in 2025 dollars).

In late 1888, Corrigan purchased a catamaran which he named Cyclone. Catamarans were extremely rare on Lake Erie, and he drew much attention for this craft. Corrigan docked the craft at Put-in-Bay on South Bass Island, where he was a member of the Put-in-Bay Yacht Club. The Cyclone sank on July 14, 1889, after it sprung a leak 1.5 miles (2.4 km) off Cleveland. Corrigan cut loose part of a sail to signal a passing fishing tug. The two men were waist-deep in water before they were picked up.

=== Idler sinking ===
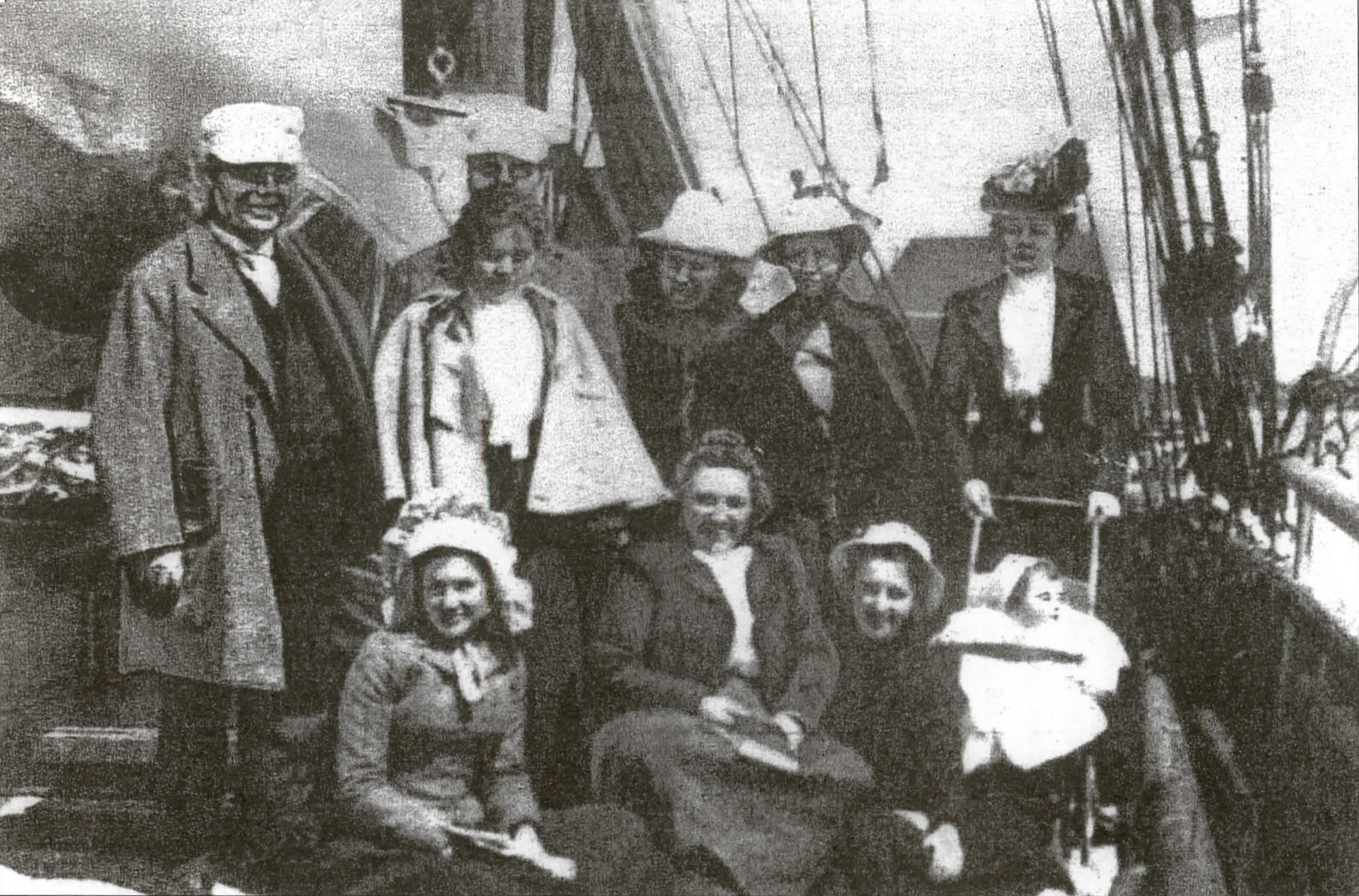
James Corrigan, his brother, and their families on the Idler prior to departure on June 30, 1900

On October 5, 1899, Corrigan purchased the luxury schooner yacht Idler for about $12,000 ($464,400 in 2025 dollars). Idler was a 97 feet (30 m) long ocean-going racing vessel. When Corrigan purchased her, she was rotting and decrepit. Corrigan spent $8,000 ($309,600 in 2025 dollars) rebuilding and refurbishing the yacht. He had all but her hull replaced and the ship painted white. Her new interior accommodations were extremely comfortable.

On June 8, 1900, James Corrigan took the Idler out on Lake Erie for handling trials prior to her "maiden" voyage. A thunderstorm with heavy rain hit the ship, and she almost went over on her beam ends. The storm came on suddenly, and Corrigan himself helped lower the mainsail. The rope slid through his fingers, injuring him.

About June 30, the Idler left Cleveland for Lake St. Clair. Aboard were James Corrigan; his 46-year-old wife, Ida Belle; his 22-year-old daughter Jane; and his 15-year-old daughter Ida May. Traveling with them was James's eldest married daughter, 24-year-old Nettie Corrigan Rieley and her one-year-old daughter, Mary. The other family traveling on the Idler was that of John Corrigan, and included his 51-year-old wife, Mary; 18-year-old daughter Etta Irene; and 22-year old married daughter Viola Gilbert. While at Port Huron on July 6, James Corrigan, suffering from a severe ear infection, left the Idler and took a train home to Cleveland to see his doctor. Viola Gilbert accompanied him so that she might attend a friend's bridal shower in Cleveland. John Corrigan also left the Idler to take a train to Buffalo, New York, where he had a business meeting.

The Idler was approaching Cleveland when the captain and crew saw a squall approaching from the northwest at about 12 noon. About 1:45 PM, the sky was very threatening and it was growing darker. mate Samuel Biggam asked Captain Charles J. Holmes if they should take the sails down. Holmes replied, "Keep it on and have a little excitement." (Note: Holmes later denied ever saying such a thing.)

Just before 2 PM, with the Idler about 16 miles (26 km) northwest of Cleveland, Capt. Holmes ordered the crew to furl several sails. The wind had suddenly become quite strong, however. The crew was just beginning to take down some sails when the storm struck.

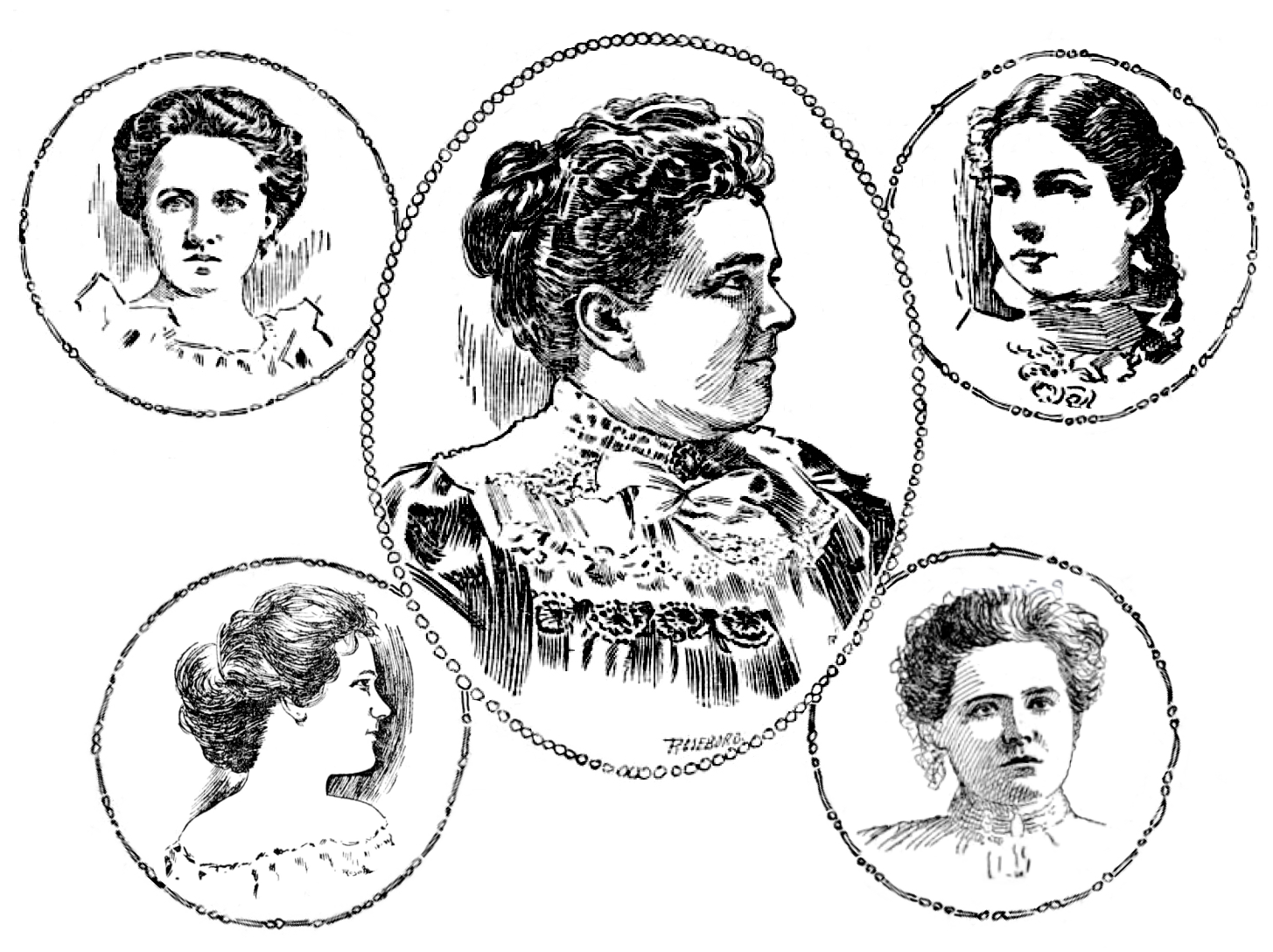
The Idler dead. Clockwise from upper left: Etta Corrigan, Ida May Corrigan, Nettie Corrigan Rieley, and Jane Corrigan. Center: Ida Belle Corrigan. Not shown: Infant Mary Rieley.

Two or three minutes later, the Idler went on her starboard side. The Idler righted herself, but three minutes after the first gust hit another powerful blast of wind again pushed the Idler over onto her starboard side.

Water began pouring into the ship through the open companionway, skylight, and open ports in the deck. The Idler lay on her side for approximately three minutes, then sank stern first. All passengers except Mary Corrigan drowned. The captain, mate, and all crew members survived.

Corrigan blamed Holmes for the disaster. "I consider negligence on the part of Captain Holmes as being the cause of the disaster. When we arrived at the scene of the accident, we saw the mainsail and foresail in a position indicating that they had not been taken in, as they should have been under the circumstances."

On November 10, 1900, the Cuyahoga County Coroner rendered a verdict of accidental death.

Captain Holmes was arrested on July 18, 1990, and charged with manslaughter under federal law. Trial was delayed repeatedly, but finally scheduled for February 19, 1902. As the trial date approached, however, the prosecution's key witness could not be found. The judge nolled the case at request of the U.S. Attorney on February 19.

Immediately after the disaster, James Corrigan said he wanted to blow the Idler apart with dynamite. He changed his mind on July 10, and turned title to the boat over to his friend, Albert R. Rumsey.

== Politics ==
In April 1887, James Corrigan ran as the Republican candidate for treasurer of the city of Cleveland. He lost to Democratic candidate Thomas Axworthy, 59.6 percent to 39.3 percent.

Corrigan was one of the co-founders of the Cleveland Chamber of Commerce in April 1893.

== Personal life ==
James Corrigan was a strong, broad-shouldered man. He had simple tastes and was disinterested in high society and rich clothing.

Iron Trade magazine called him fearless, earnest, and straight-talking to the point of bluntness. The Plain Dealer newspaper described him as "of warm disposition and much sympathy". At the time of Corrigan's death, one of his friends said: "The great things were his courage, his intensity, his fairness and his sterling integrity, and with these his loyalty to friends and the right. ... It was not known, except to his intimates, that this lion hearted man had always the heart and softness and sympathy of a child."

Corrigan was a lifelong Episcopalian. He was a member of the Union Club (the city's oldest private business club), the Euclid Golf Club, and the Roadside Club (a horse racing and gambling club).

=== Family ===
On July 29, 1875, James Corrigan married Ida Belle Allen, daughter of William C. and Isabella Allen of Cleveland, Ohio. The couple had three daughters: Jane (born 1877), Jeanette (nicknamed Nettie, born 1878), and Ida May (born 1885). Their son, James W., was born 1880 in Grybów, Austrian Galicia. In April 1906, James was living in San Francisco, California, when the famous earthquake struck the city. For days, James Corrigan had no idea if his son was dead or alive. James Jr. was Corrigan's only child not to die during the sinking of the Idler.

In July 1901, Letha House of Lafayette Township, Medina County, Ohio, contacted Corrigan. She had been raised by George W. Morse in the village of Whittlesey. After she turned 21, she was told that her real last name was Brewster. She discovered that her mother was Margaret Corrigan Brewster, and that she was still alive and living in Tacoma, Washington. By accident, Letha read about James Corrigan in the newspaper and contacted him. James confirmed to her that she was his niece.

=== Homes ===
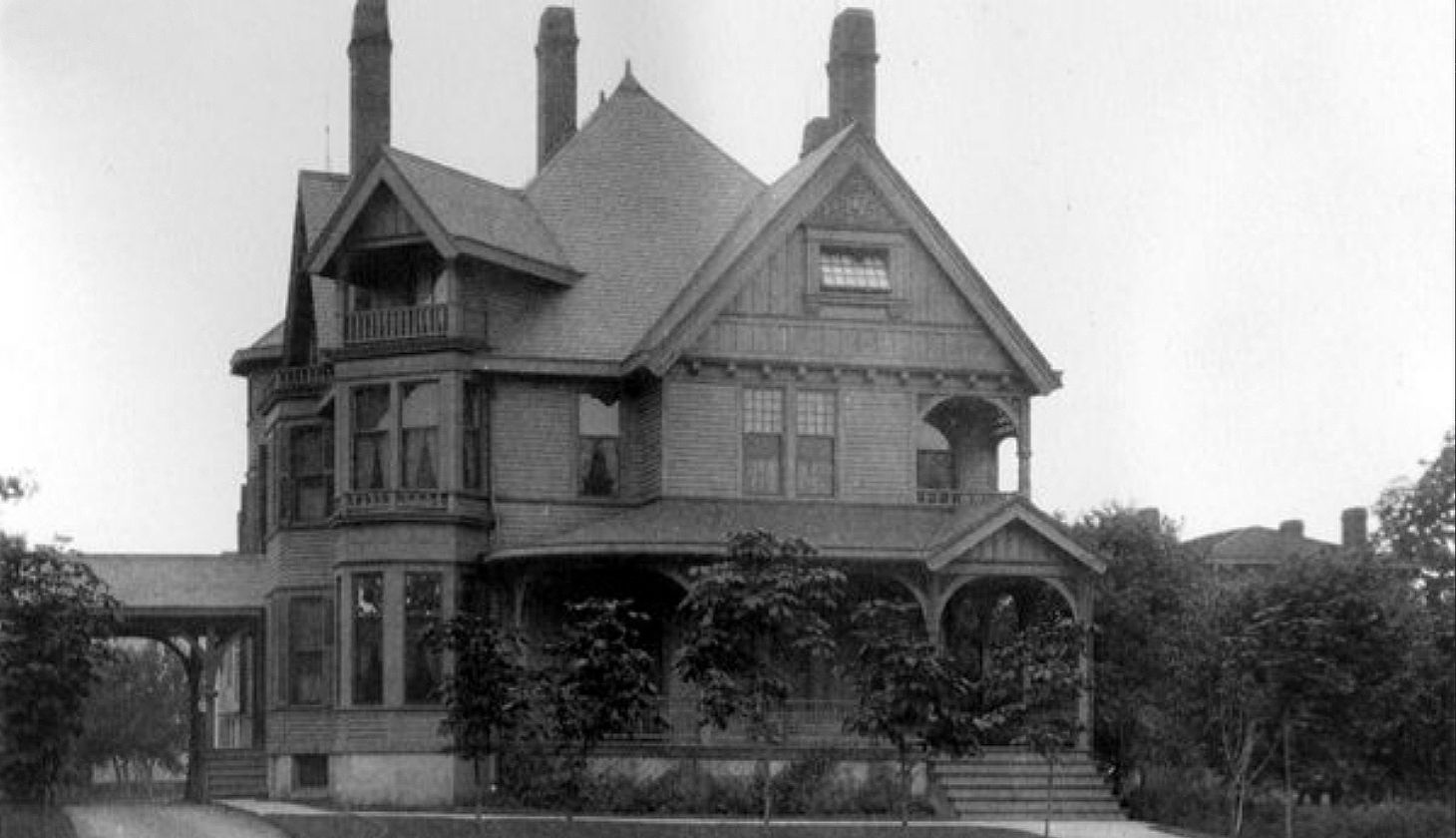
1340 Willson Avenue in Cleveland, James Corrigan's home from 1887 to 1907.

James Corrigan owned homes in Cleveland at 271 Clinton Avenue in 1883 and 1884, and at home: 364 Franklin Avenue in 1885 and 1886. Corrigan purchased a newly-built home in 1887 located at 1340 Willson Avenue. Corrigan still lived there at the time of the Idler disaster.

The year before his death, James Corrigan purchased the residence of Cleveland Electrical Manufacturing executive A.B. Foster, located at 8114 Euclid Avenue, for $25,000 (equivalent to $613,000 in 2024). The local architectural firm of Searles, Hirsh & Gavin designed numerous, expensive renovations to the two-and-a-half story brick home. The structure was expanded from 10 to 19 rooms and given four bathrooms. The cost of the remodeling was $10,000 (equivalent to $245,000 in 2024). The property was somewhat large, and Corrigan erected stables there at a cost of $7,500 (equivalent to $184,000 in 2024), also designed by Searles, Hirsh & Gavin.

James Corrigan's home was in Cleveland, but he had a second residence, Nagirroc, (often referred to as his "summer house") in Wickliffe, Ohio. Ida Belle Corrigan purchased the 56 acres (23 ha) that became Narirroc in April 1891. About 1892, James C. Corrigan constructed a large vernacular home on the property. In front of the house were large, formal gardens featuring popular flowers, while the rear featured a lawn and a small pond surrounded by exotic plants. James Corrigan added 12.78 acres (5.17 ha) to the site in May 1904, and made extensive alterations to the house in the fall of 1906 at a cost of $10,000 ($400,000 in 2025 dollars).

In the summer of 1901, Corrigan visited the Morrisburg, Ontario, area and became enamored of Dry Island, a 25-acre (10 ha) island in the St. Lawrence River. Corrigan constructed a residence on the island from September 1904 to summer 1905. It was three stories high, had 38 rooms, and was appointed with heavy, luxury furniture and expensive oriental rugs. Considered "a residential showplace", the home alone cost $20,000 (equivalent to $544,000 in 2024), with the rest of the island's improvements coming in at another $580,000 (equivalent to $15,787,000 in 2024). The furnishings cost an additional $50,0000 (equivalent to $1,361,000 in 2024).

=== Death ===
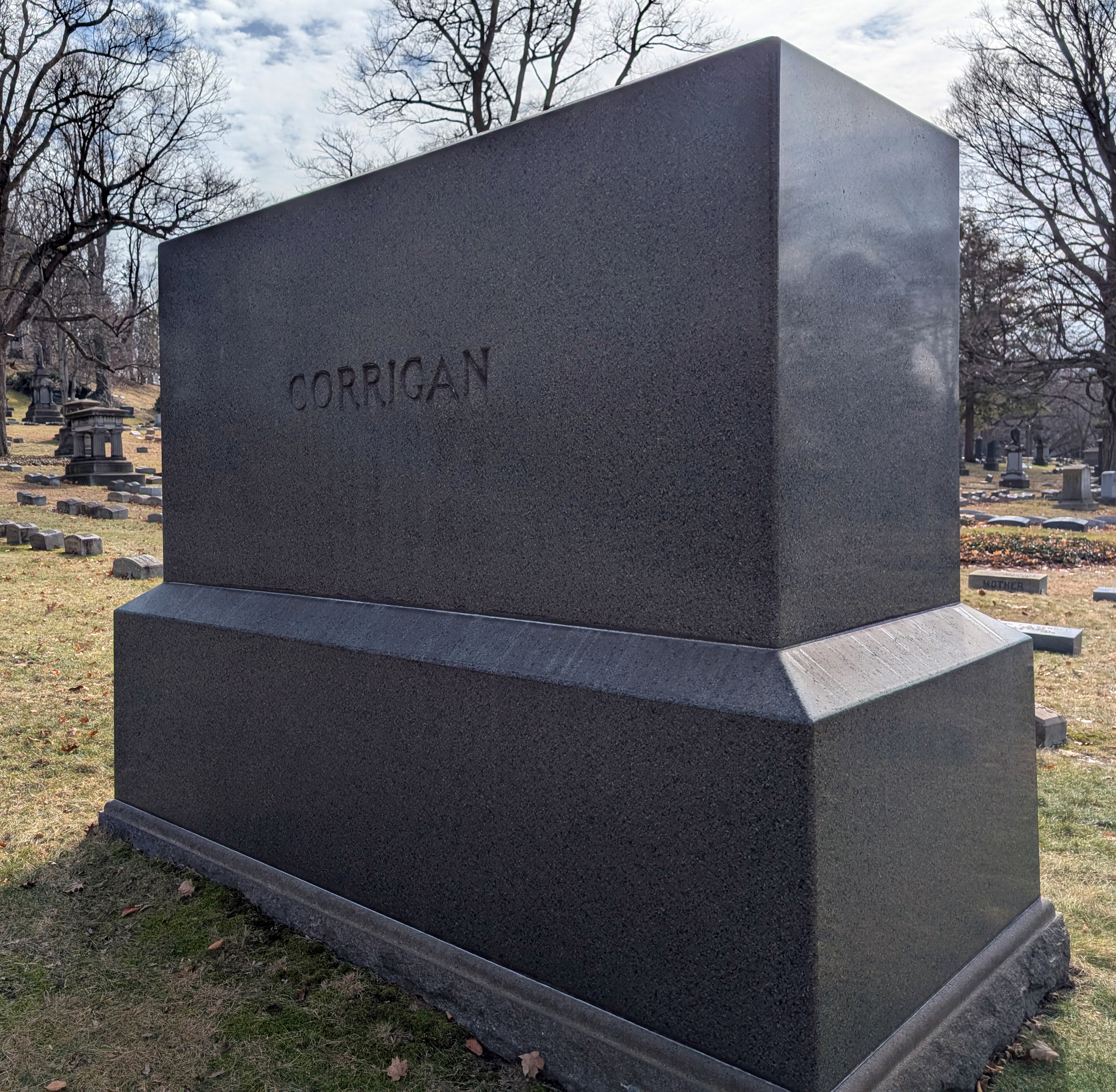
Corrigan family headstone at Lake View Cemetery

James Corrigan was known to be quite healthy all his life, but in May 1888 he was quite ill for two weeks with an unknown illness. He was ill off and on in 1906, 1907, and the first half of 1908, which prevented him from traveling.

On September 10, 1908, Corrigan contracted peritonitis while at his summer home in Wickliffe, Ohio. His condition worsened swiftly, and four doctors were called in on September 14 to consult on the case. He came close to death on September 15, but rallied the next day and recovered. He returned to work in mid October.

In late December 1908, Corrigan was diagnosed with appendicitis. He underwent an appendectomy on December 24, but there were complications from the surgery and he died at his home at 8114 Euclid Avenue on December 24, 1908.

James Corrigan's funeral was held at his home. Rev. J.D. Williamson, a close friend and former pastor of Beckwith Memorial Presbyterian Church, officiated. He was interred in the family plot at Lake View Cemetery.

At the time of his death, James Corrigan was worth $10 million (equivalent to $245,558,000 in 2024). This included his mines, which he personally owned, worth $750,000 (equivalent to $18,417,000 in 2024), and his Wickliffe summer home, worth $38,000 (equivalent to $933,000 in 2024). Corrigan left nothing to charity in his will. His estate went to relatives and close friends. His son, his only surviving heir, received an additional $250,000 (equivalent to $6,139,000 in 2024) in life insurance.

=== Accolades ===
At the time of his death, James Corrigan was a nationally known industrialist.

In September 1907, the Frontier Steamship Co. of Tonawanda, New York, announced the construction of a large new lake freighter to be named for James Corrigan. The vessel, built by Great Lakes Engineering Works of Detroit, was 550 feet (170 m) long, had a beam of 56 feet (17 m), and drew 31 feet (9.4 m) of water. She could carry 10,000 short tons (9,100 t), had triple expansion steam engines, and utilized Scotch boilers. The James Corrigan was launched from the Ecorse, Michigan, yard of the Great Lakes Engineering Works on May 16, 1908.

James Corrigan's impact on the city of Cleveland was considered immense. The Plain Dealer called him "one of the group of men who made Cleveland, who saw the opportunities of its location... and out of them founded a great city." Corrigan was "one of the best known vessel and mine owners on the lakes". In 1908, his fleet was the largest independent shipping concern in the country. It was not the biggest fleet on the Great Lakes, but it was one of the most important. In 1908, he was still one of the largest independent iron mine operators in the United States.

== Bibliography ==
- American Iron and Steel Association (1890). Directory of Iron and Steel Works of the United States and Canada. Philadelphia: Allen, Lane & Scott. OCLC 2092992.
- American Iron and Steel Institute (1920). Directory of Iron and Steel Works of the United States and Canada. Philadelphia: Allen, Lane & Scott. OCLC 2092992.
- Annewalt, B.D. (1873). Cleveland Directory, 1873-74. Cleveland: W.S. Robison & Co.
- Annewalt, B.D. (1874). Cleveland Directory for the Year Ending April 1875. Cleveland: W.S. Robison & Co.
- Bailey, A. (1871). Cleveland City Directory 1871-72. Cleveland: W.S. Robison & Co.
- Bellamy, John Stark (2010). The Last Days of Cleveland: And More True Tales of Crime and Disaster From Cleveland's Past. Cleveland: Gray & Company. ISBN 9781598510676.
- Biographical Cyclopedia and Portrait Gallery With an Historical Sketch of the State of Ohio. Vol. 1. Cincinnati: Western Biographical Publishing Company. 1883. OCLC 1333002342.
- Carter, J. Smyth (1905). The Story of Dundas: Being a History of the County of Dundas From 1784 to 1904. Iroquois, Ontario: St. Lawrence News. OCLC 300129120.
- Chernow, Ron (2004). Titan: The Life of John D. Rockefeller, Sr. New York: Vintage Books. ISBN 9781400077304.
- Cleveland Directory for the Year Ending July 1884. Cleveland: Cleveland City Directory. 1883.
- Cleveland Directory for the Year Ending July 1885. Cleveland: Cleveland City Directory. 1884.
- Cleveland Directory for the Year Ending July 1886. Cleveland: Cleveland City Directory. 1885.
- Cleveland Directory for the Year Ending July 1887. Cleveland: Cleveland City Directory. 1886.
- Cleveland Directory for the Year Ending July 1888. Cleveland: Cleveland City Directory. 1887.
- Cleveland Directory for the Year Ending July 1889. Cleveland: Cleveland City Directory. 1888.
- Comley, William J.; D'Eggville, W. (1875). Ohio: the Future Great State. Cleveland: Comley Brothers Manufacturing and Publishing Company. OCLC 2031926.
- Cox, Bruce K. (2003). Mines of the Pewabic Country of Michigan and Wisconsin. Marquette, Mich.: Agogeebic Press. OCLC 51308388.
- Crowell, Benedict; Murray, C.B. (1927). The Iron Ores of Lake Superior: Containing Some Facts of Interest Relating to Mining, Beneficiation and Shipping of the Ore and Location of Principal Mines. Cleveland: The Penton Press Company. OCLC 2831538.
- Flynn, John T. (1932). God's Gold: The Story of Rockefeller and His Times. Westport, Conn.: Greenwood Press. OCLC 1371046418.
- Hidy, Ralph W.; Hidy, Muriel E. (1919). History of Standard Oil Company (New Jersey). Vol. 1: Pioneering In Big Business (1882-1911). New York: Harper and Brothers. OCLC 228190.
- Jensen, John Odin (2019). Stories From the Wreckage: A Great Lakes Maritime History Inspired By Shipwrecks. Madison, Wisc.: Wisconsin Historical Society Press. ISBN 9780870209024.
- Kennedy, James Harrison (1897). A History of the City of Cleveland: Biographical Volume. Cleveland: Imperial Press. OCLC 3577276.
- King, JoAnn (2003). Letha E. House: From Foundling to Philanthropist. Medina, Ohio: Medina Historical Society. ISBN 9780974648309.
- Kingman, Dan C. (1904). Annual Reports of the War Department for the Year Ended June 30, 1904. Vol. VII: Report of the Chief of Engineers: Part 3. P. P. II Removing Sunken Vessels or Craft obstructing or Endangering Navigation (Report). Washington, D.C.: Government Printing Office.
- Lawton, Charles D. (1897). Mines and Mineral Statistics. Michigan Commissioner of Mineral Statistics. Ishpeming, Mich.: Presses of the Iron Ore Printing House. OCLC 1757279.
- Mansfield, John Brandt (1899). History of the Great Lakes, in Two Volumes: Illustrated. Volume II. Chicago: J.H. Beers & Co. OCLC 5721692.
- Morgan, Eleanor Wickware (1964). "Up the Front": A Story of Morrisburg. Toronto: Ryerson Press. OCLC 451172.
- Nevins, Allan (1940). John D. Rockefeller: The Heroic Age of American Enterprise. Vol. 2. New York: Charles Scribner's Sons. OCLC 1181390168.
- Newett, George A. (1899). Mines and Mineral Statistics. Michigan Department of Mineral Statistics. Ishpeming, Mich.: Presses of Iron Ore Printing House. OCLC 13273219.
- "Pioneer Ore Firm Adds Steel Mills to Its Large Furnace and Iron Mine Holdings". Iron Trade and Western Machinist. November 15, 1917. pp. 1043–1054.
- Quin, Richard H. (1993). Indiana County, Pennsylvania: An Inventory of Historic Engineering and Industrial Sites (PDF). Washington, D.C.: Historic American Buildings Survey/Historic American Engineering Record. OCLC 27432667.
- Reese, A.K. (January 11, 1923). "Modern Blast-Furnace Practice". Engineering Production.
- Rose, William Ganson (1950). Cleveland: The Making of a City. Cleveland: World Publishing Co. OCLC 1144590608.
- Schotter, H.W. (1927). Growth and Development of the Pennsylvania Railroad Company. Philadelphia: Press of Allen, Lane & Scott. OCLC 7109166.
- Sipes, William B. (1875). The Pennsylvania Railroad: Its Origin, Construction, Condition, and Connections. Philadelphia: Pennsylvania Railroad Co. OCLC 1080746.
- Van Brunt, Walter, ed. (1921). Duluth and St. Louis County, Minnesota: Their Story and People. Vol II. Chicago: The American Historical Society. OCLC 21023596.
- Walker, E.H. (1884). Annual Statistical Report of the New York Produce Exchange for the Year 1883 (Report). New York: Jones Printing Co. OCLC 1055693257.
- Wilson, William Bender (1899). History of the Pennsylvania Railroad Company: With Plan of Organization, Portraits of Officials, and Biographical Sketches. Philadelphia: H.T. Coates. OCLC 17762229.
