= Nagirroc =

James Corrigan historic estate in Wickliffe, Ohio, U.S.

- Twin
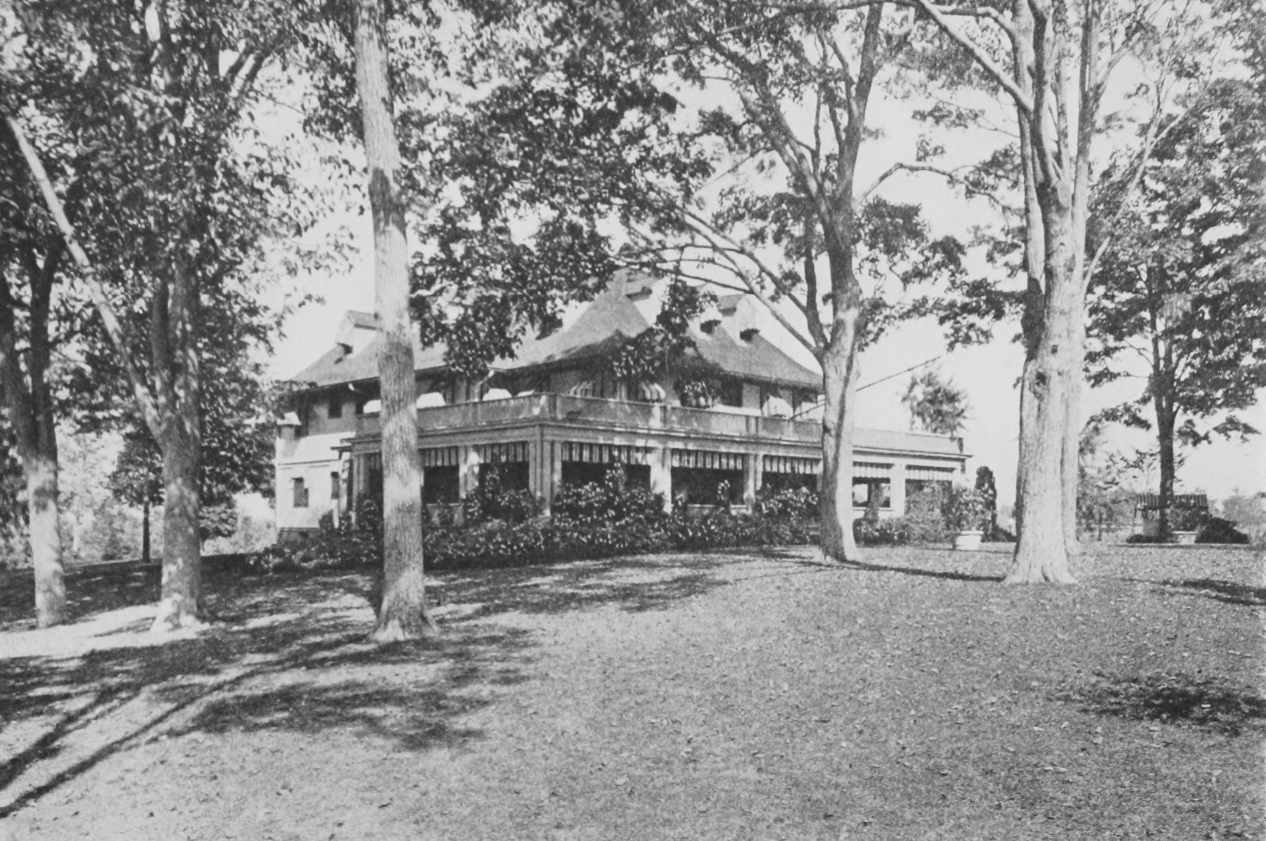
- The house at Nagirroc in 1917

- Nagirroc
- 41°36′22.77″N 81°26′56.97″W
- Location: 30601 Ridge Road, Wickliffe, Ohio

History
- Built: Estate: 1891; House: c. 1892
- Built for: James C. Corrigan

Site notes
- Architectural style: Vernacular
- Current use: Golf course

Nagirroc was a historic country estate in Lake County, Ohio, that existed from 1891 to 1924. It was the summer residence of Cleveland, Ohio, shipping, mining, and steel manufacturing magnate James C. Corrigan. The original acreage that made up Nagirroc (which is "Corrigan" spelled backwards) was purchased in 1891, and a large home built there. After Corrigan's death in 1908, the estate passed to his son, James W. Corrigan. The son greatly expanded the estate, and turned it into a farm and horticultural showcase. The estate was sold in 1924, and most of it turned into a golf course.

== Founding ==
James C. Corrigan was a multimillionaire who lived in Cleveland, Ohio. His fortune derived from his large shipping fleet, iron ore dealing, iron mines, and (after 1907) Corrigan, McKinney Steel. Corrigan's primary home was in Cleveland, Ohio, but he had a second residence (often referred to as his "summer house") in Wickliffe, Ohio.

This second home was located on the north side of what was then Pine Ridge Road (the modern address is 30601 Ridge Road). Corrigan's wife, Ida Belle Corrigan, purchased 56 acres (23 ha) in Lake County on April 3, 1891. The ground consisted of gently rolling low hills, crossed by several small creeks and punctuated by a number of springs.

About 1892, James C. Corrigan constructed a large vernacular home on the property. In front of the house were large, formal gardens featuring popular flowers, while the rear featured a lawn and a small pond surrounded by exotic plants. Corrigan enjoyed horseback riding, so he also erected stables on the estate and created numerous bridle paths.

James C. Corrigan added 12.78 acres (5.17 ha) to the site on May 5, 1904. He made extensive alterations to the house in the fall of 1906 at a cost of $10,000 ($400,000 in 2025 dollars).

== James W. Corrigan years ==
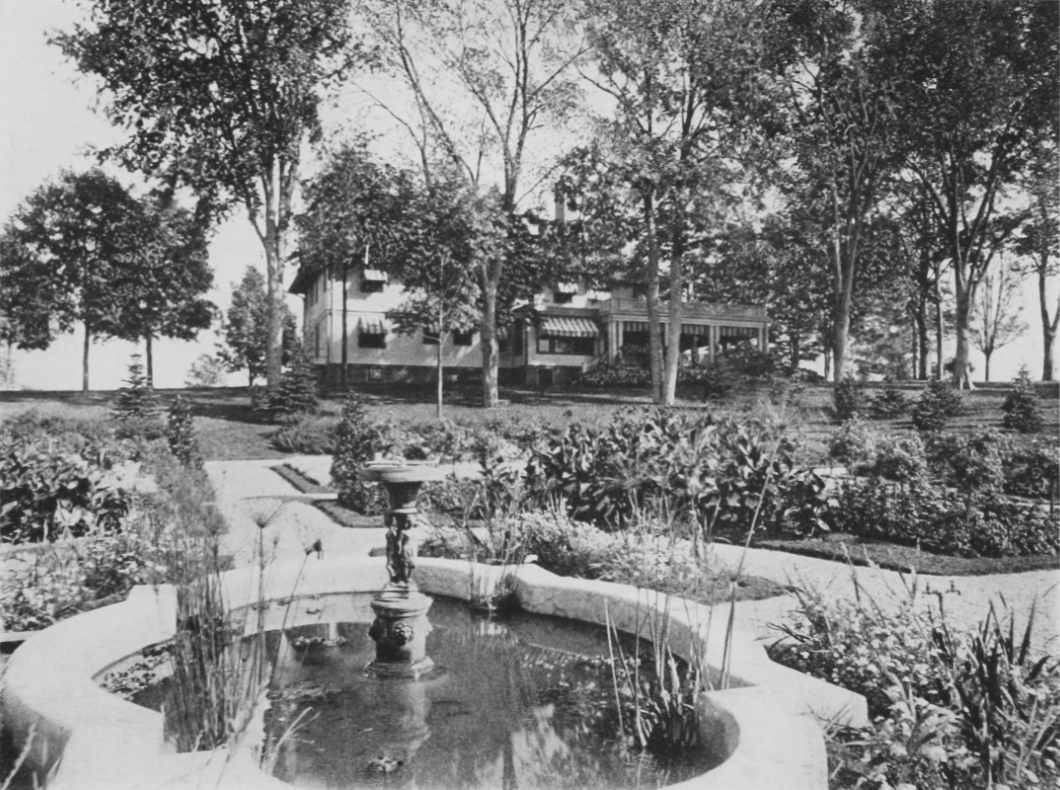
The rear of the Nagirroc estate house in 1917.

James C. Corrigan died in December 1908, and Nagirroc was inherited by his son, James W. Corrigan.

The younger Corrigan spent several hundred thousand dollars landscaping Nagirroc. As early as 1912, he had established a large aviary holding many exotic birds, and a bear pit capable of holding six adult bears. By 1916, he had established a small private zoo for himself.

James W. Corrigan turned Nagirroc into more of a farm than a wooded private estate. He raised milch cows and established a dairy. A large portion of the grounds were used to raise poultry. Corrigan had 700 white Leghorn chickens, 50 white American Pekin ducks, and a flock of turkeys. He also raised pheasants, including Golden, Lady Amherst, Reeves's, ringnecked, Silvers, and versi-colored, and the rare Impeyan. His poultry operation included modern incubators and large system of brooders (places to keep chicks protected, warm, fed, and watered until they are big enough for a coop or outdoor enclosure). The farm had its own electrical plant powered by coal gas.

Corrigan donated large shipments of flowers to local hospitals, orphanages, and other institutions for the sick, poor, and needy. He built a large refrigeration and storage plant on the estate to hold cut flowers prior to distribution. His dairy products and poultry were to restaurants and in select stores.

Corrigan enlarged the estate in May 1916 by purchasing 91 acres (37 ha) south of Ridge Road. It doubled in size between 1916 and 1924 to 425 acres (172 ha). The estate became a showcase for exotic plants, particularly flowers. James Jr. also added a private golf course and a 270-foot (82 m) long swimming pool.

Nagirroc was largely open to the public, and numerous graveled paths guided people about the property. Of all the estates owned by wealthy businessmen in Lake County, Nagirroc was considered the most beautiful and best-run.

At some point between 1908 and 1924, the home which James C. Corrigan had built burned down. James W. Corrigan had a new structure built about 300 feet (91 m) to the northwest, a bit further away from Ridge Road.

== Golf course ==
A syndicate of investors purchased Nagirroc on January 7, 1924, for $350,000 (equivalent to $5,066,000 in 2024). The syndicate turned the land over to the newly-formed Cedarhurst Golf Club. The house was converted into a clubhouse and substantial additions made, including a kitchen, ballroom, locker rooms, showers

The house-cum-clubhouse burned down in the autumn of 1925. The golf club built a new concrete clubhouse on the site of James C. Corrigan's old home. In March 1926, 200 acres (81 ha) of the estate were sold and became the Cedarhurst Club Colony luxury housing development.

Cedarhurst became the Pine Ridge Golf Club in April 1928.

In March 1992, the private golf course was sold to Lake Metroparks for $2.76 million (equivalent to $5,524,000 in 2024). It is still operated as a public golf course as of 2025.
