= Lake Carriers Association =

American Great Lakes shipping advocacy organization

- Predecessor: Lake Carriers Association, Cleveland Vessel Owners' Association
- Formation: April 28, 1892; 134 years ago
- Type: Nonprofit
- Legal status: Trade association
- Headquarters: Westlake, Ohio, US

The Lake Carriers Association is a nonprofit organization based in Westlake, Ohio, in the United States which acts as an advocacy body for U.S.-flagged shipping on the Great Lakes.

== Predecessor groups ==
There were several local associations representing vessel owners on the Great Lakes in the 1880s and 1890s. The Cleveland Vessel Owners' Association was formed in Cleveland, Ohio, on March 27, 1868. The Lake Carriers' Association was formed in Buffalo, New York, on May 21, 1885.

Both bodies were formed to address general issues regarding navigation on the Great Lakes and tributary rivers, issues involved the freight and shipping business, and to advance the common interest of Great Lakes shippers.

== Merger ==
By 1892, many Cleveland area owners felt that a regional association would be more effective in advocating for federal and state funds to improve shipping conditions. James Corrigan, owner of the Corrigan fleet, and Morris A. Bradley, owner of Bradley Transportation (a major Great Lakes fleet as well as shipbuilder), proposed that the Cleveland Vessel Owners' Association merge with the Lake Carriers Association. The Cleveland group appointed a committee of its members in March 1892 to effect a merger. Largely through Corrigan's influence, the consolidation occurred.

The two organizations merged on April 28. Bradley was elected the LCA's first president. Corrigan was elected president in January 1894.

== Current membership and leadership ==
The Lake Carriers Association continues to represent U.S.-flagged shippers on the Great Lakes. As of June 2025, the organization had 13 members, which operated a total of 43 lake freighters. George J. Ryan, formerly the director of the Great Lakes Region of the United States Maritime Administration, served as president from January 1, 1983, to January 14, 2002. He was succeeded by James Weakley, a former United States Coast Guard commander.
