= Menominee Range =

Iron ore deposit in Michigan

Coordinates: 45°46′N 87°51′W

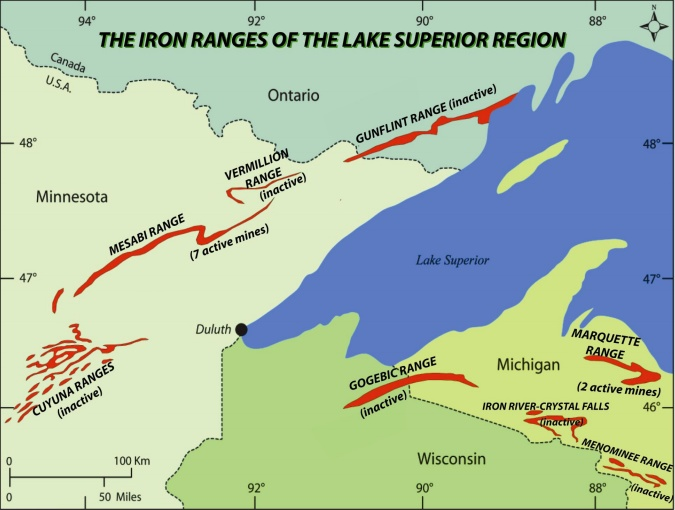
Lake Superior Iron Ranges. The Menominee Range is at lower right.

The Menominee Range is an area of iron ore deposits located in northern Michigan and northern Wisconsin in the United States. It was the second iron range to be discovered in Michigan. Mining began in Michigan in 1877, but was commercially played out by 1979. Mining activity in Wisconsin did not begin until 1880, and ended in 1937.

== Geography and ore bodies ==
=== Michigan ===
Menominee iron ore deposits in Michigan lie in Upper Huronian rock that is about 2.318 billion years old. Individual ore bodies are found in complexly folded rock. Menominee iron ore in Michigan is generally gray, fine-banded hematite, although occasionally small blocks of flinty hematite also can be found.

The Menominee Range in Michigan has three distinct segments. The Crystal Falls middle segment was identified in 1845 by a private surveyor who found an iron-rich hill. The eastern segment, centered on what is now the town of Iron Mountain, was located in 1848 when United States government geologists discovered a bed of specularite (specular hematite). The western segment was identified in 1851 by a United States government surveyor who found an outcrop of iron ore 6 feet (1.8 m) high at what is now the town of Iron River.

=== Wisconsin ===
Menominee iron ore deposits in Wisconsin lie in complexly folded Middle Precambrian rock that is about 1.8 to 1.9 billion years old. Menominee iron ore in Wisconsin consists of hematite, magnetite, or siderite. It is found in thin beds, intermingled with rock such as conglomerate, dolomite, quartzite, or slate.

The Menominee Range in Wisconsin is limited to Florence County and the extreme northern part of Marinette County. Although geologically dissimilar to the rock and deposits in Michigan and not contiguous with it, it is still considered the same range geologically. This is because iron ore in both areas comes from complexly folded rock, and the deposits trend northwest to southeast in both.

== History of mining ==
=== Michigan mining ===
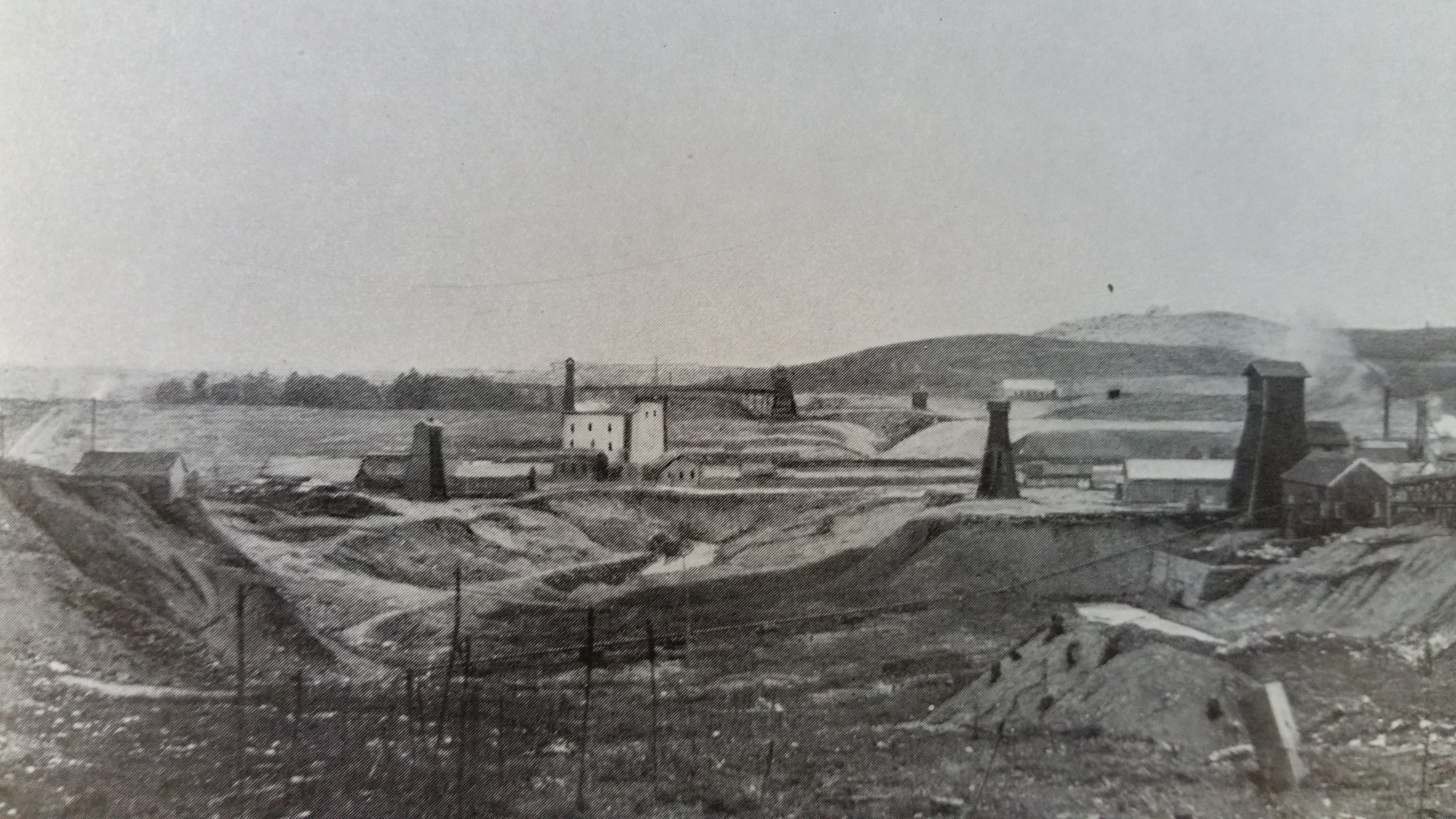
The Chapin Mine in 1904

The Menominee Range was the second great iron producing region to be discovered on the Upper Peninsula of Michigan. The first indication that there might be iron deposits in the area occurred at Crystal Falls, Michigan, in 1845, but actual ore deposits were not discovered until 1866 by Thomas and Bartley Breen at Waucedah, Michigan (section 22, township 39 N, range 28 W)/ The Upper Peninsula of Michigan remained largely inaccessible for mining until the Chicago and North Western Railway was built in 1872. The first mines to open on the Menominee were the Breen and Emmett mines in the village of Waucedah, Michigan (section 22, township 39 N, range 28 W) in 1877.

The early mines were open-pit, but once surface deposits were exhausted many mines continued as underground operations. More than 1,500,000 long tons (1,500,000 t) of ore were mined in the first five years the range was open. In its sixth year alone, 1,000,000 long tons (1,000,000 t) were mined. It had taken the Marquette Iron Range 20 years to mine a million tons a year.

The Chapin Mine at Iron Mountain, Michigan, was discovered in 1879, and produced more ore than any other mine in the Menominee. The western end of the Menominee Range opened in 1880 after two ore strikes were made at Crystal Falls.

At one point, 70 mines operating on the Menominee Range. In the 1890s, more than 4,000 miners were employed on the eastern end of the Menominee alone.

Between 1854 and 1972, the Menominee Range produced 297,883,000 long tons (302,663,000 t) of iron ore., second only to the Marquette Range. The last iron mine on the Menominee closed in 1979.

=== Wisconsin mining ===
The Menominee Range in Wisconsin began to be mined in 1880 in both open-pit and underground mines. Ore was generally shipped by train to Escanaba, Michigan, for shipment by water.

Considered less productive than the Michigan portion, the Wisconsin segment of the Menominee Range shipped 7,000,000 long tons (7,100,000 t) of ore during its productive lifetime. Mining stopped on the Menominee in Wisconsin in 1937.

== Bibliography ==
- Bayley, William Shirley (1904). "The Menominee Iron-Bearing District of Michigan". Washington, D.C.: U.S. Geological Survey. OCLC 265443300.
- Borowiecki, Barbara; Paull, Rachel Krebs (2008). "Geography and Topography". In Chamberlain, Oscar B. (ed.). Wisconsin Encyclopedia. Volume 1. Hamburg, Wisc.: State History Publications. ISBN 9781878592613.
- Magnaghi, Russell M. (2017). Upper Peninsula of Michigan: A History. Marquette, Mich.: 906 Heritage. ISBN 9781387016815.
- Miller, George J. (1914). "Some Geographic Influences of the Lake Superior Iron Ores". Bulletin of the American Geographical Society. 46 (12).
- Resentreter, Roger L. (2014). Michigan: A History of Explorers, Entrepreneurs, and Everyday People. Ann Arbor, Mich.: University of Michigan Press. ISBN 9780472071906.
- Schaetzl, Randall J.; Darden, Joe T.; Brandt, Danita S. (2009). Michigan Geography and Geology. New York: Custom Publishing. ISBN 9780536987167.
- Schultz, Gwen (2004). Wisconsin's Foundations: A Review of the State's Geology and Its Influence on Geography and Human Activity. Madison, Wisc.: University of Wisconsin Press. ISBN 9780299198749.
- Vachon, Paul (2024). Michigan's Upper Peninsula. Berkeley, Calif.: Hachette Book Group. ISBN 9781640499966.
