= Corrigan, McKinney & Company =

American mining, shipping, and steel company, 1894 to 1935

Corrigan, McKinney & Co.
- Type: Private
- Industry: Steel, shipping, mining
- Founded: 1887 (roots); 1894 (as Corrigan, McKinney & Co.); 1918 (as McKinney Steel); 1926 (as Corrigan, McKinney Steel)
- Founder: James Corrigan, Price McKinney, and Stevenson Burke
- Defunct: 1935; 91 years ago
- Fate: Acquisition
- Successor: Republic Steel (1935); Cleveland-Cliffs (1930—1935)
- Headquarters: Perry-Payne Building, Cleveland, Ohio, U.S.
- Products: Iron ore pig iron steel
- Subsidiaries: Buffalo Mining Co.; Colby Iron Mining Co.; Crystal Falls Iron Mining Co.; Cuyahoga Mining Co.; Dunn Iron Mining Co.; Great Western Iron Mining Co.; Lincoln Iron Mining Co.; Pence Ore Co.; Queen Iron Mining Co.; St. Paul Iron Mining Co.; Stevenson Iron Mining Co.; Sunday Lake Iron Mining Co.; Winnifred Iron Mining Co.; N. G. Taylor & Co.; Newton Steel

Corrigan, McKinney & Co. was an iron ore wholesaler, iron mine owner and operator, and pig iron producer based in Cleveland, Ohio. Its majority stockholder was founder James C. Corrigan, and the silent partner was Cleveland railroad magnate Stevenson Burke. It emerged in March 1894 after the bankruptcy of Corrigan, Ives & Co., with Burke's son-in-law, Price McKinney, becoming the second largest stockholder. Gogebic, Marquette, Mesabi, Menominee iron ranges in Michigan, Minnesota, and Wisconsin, where for many years it was second only to U.S. Steel in terms of annual tonnage mined. It owned pig iron smelters in New York, Ohio, and Pennsylvania, as well as limestone quarries and coal fields in New York and Pennsylvania.

The company went into shipping business in 1896 and owned one of the most influential iron ore shipping fleets on the Great Lakes. It formed a subsidiary, Corrigan, McKinney Steel (later known as McKinney Steel before reverting to its original name), in 1907. Its four blast furnaces, steel furnaces, coking operation, rolling mills, and finishing mills on the Cuyahoga River were the largest in Cleveland and some of the most efficient in the United States.

In 1919, Corrigan, McKinney & Co. purchased and operated coal fields in Kentucky to ensure a steady supply of coal and coke for its steel mill.

Stevenson Burke's death in 1904 left his shares under the control of his widow, son, and daughter. The 1908 death of James C. Corrigan left his shares in the hands of his son, James W. Corrigan. He later purchased the shares of Burke's son. Price McKinney's suicide transferred his shares to his widow. After James W. Corrigan's untimely death in 1928, the shares passed to his widow, Laura Mae Corrigan.

Now known as Corrigan McKinney Steel, the company having renamed itself, the four women in control of the firm sold their shares to Cleveland-Cliffs Iron Co. in 1930. Cleveland-Cliffs borrowed heavily to purchase the shares, and was nearly driven to bankruptcy as its financial situation became imperiled by the Great Depression. Cleveland-Cliffs sold Corrigan McKinney Steel in 1934 to Republic Steel at a significant loss, and wound up a holding company that once controlled Corrigan McKinney Steel.

The sale to Republic Steel ended Corrigan McKinney's corporate existence.

== Creation of Corrigan, McKinney and Co. ==
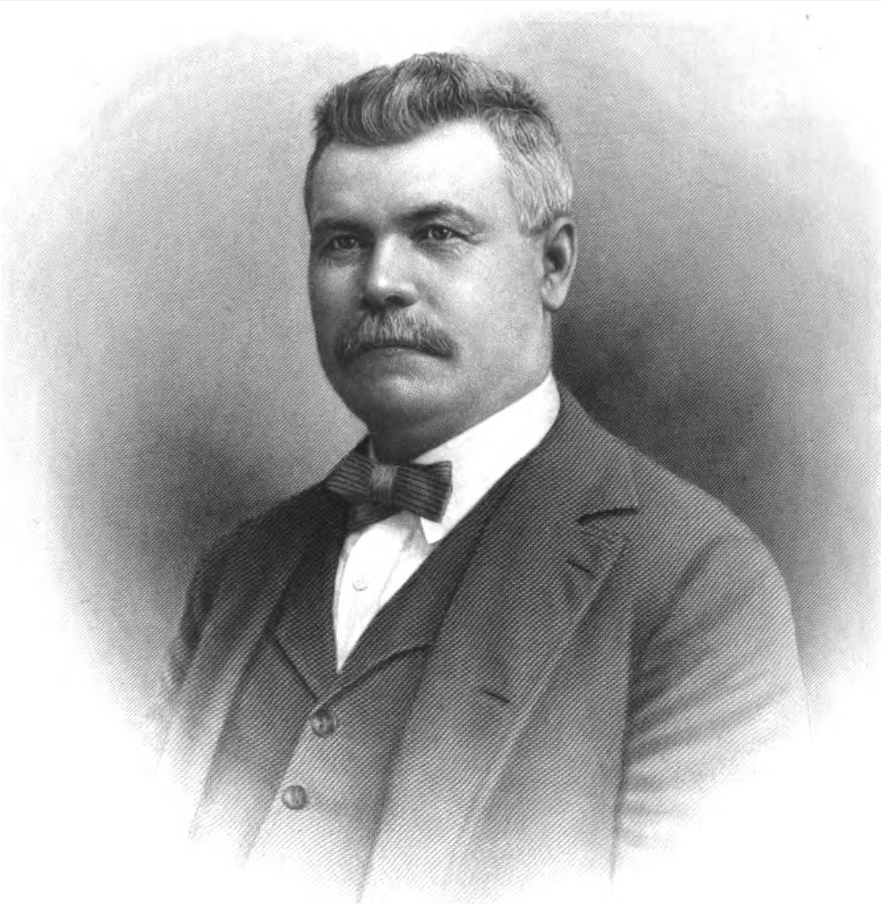
James Corrigan in 1897

=== James C. Corrigan ===
James Corrigan was a Canadian American who had engaged in petroleum refining in Cleveland from 1871 to 1887. He purchased his first shipping schooner in 1887, and became highly influential in Great Lakes shipping circles. He was a millionaire by 1889.

Having engaged in the transportation of coal and iron ore for some years, Corrigan decided to begin mining operations on his own. With co-investor and Standard Oil co-founder Stephen V. Harkness, he incorporated an iron mining company in March 1887 and leased the Iron Belt Mine on section 11 of the Gogebic Range (near Iron Belt, Wisconsin).

=== Dalliba, Hussey and Co. ===
Dalliba, Hussey & Co. was founded in January 1887 by James H. Dalliba (a veteran mine operator), Horace P. Hussey (of the stock brokerage firm Hussey, Hoyt & Co.), and the firm of Moore, Benjamin & Co. (a developer of iron mines on the Gogebic Range). It purchased the output of iron mines on the Gogebic, Marquette, and Menominee ranges, and sold it to various foundries. All the mines were owned or controlled by Moore, Benjamin & Co.

Dalliba, Hussey was under financial strain, however. Needing a wealthier investor, Moore, Benjamin & Co. sold its interest in Dalliba, Hussey & Co. to James Corrigan in August 1887. Moore, Benjamin & Co. failed in November 1887, and Dalliba, Hussey & Co. went into liquidation in February 1888.

Corrigan formed a new company in March 1888 to take up the business of the old, operating under the name Dalliba, Corrigan & Co. Stevenson Burke was a silent investor in the new partnership, which by agreement was to last three years.

=== Corrigan, Ives and Co. ===
Dalliba, Corrigan & Co. dissolved in 1891, and James Corrigan formed a new iron dealership with Stevenson Burke and Franklin T. Ives after James Dalliba pulled out. The name of the new partnership was Corrigan, Ives & Co. Corrigan, Ives & Co. quickly became one of the nation's leading iron ore and pig iron dealers, and James Corrigan made a million dollars.

The Panic of 1893 began in February 1893. In early July 1893, Stevenson Burke asked an Ohio state court to appoint a receiver for Corrigan, Ives & Co. The court agreed, and appointed Price McKinney (Burke's son-in-law) receiver on July 8.

On the whole, Corrigan, Ives & Co. was solvent and making money during the receivership. The court permitted Corrigan, Ives & Co. to reorganize under McKinney, rather than force a liquidation.

While in receivership, the company purchased the leases on the Buffalo, Prince of Wales, Queen, and South Buffalo mines on Michigan's Marquette Range for $400,000 (equivalent to $12,936,000 in 2024) in January 1894, (Note: The Prince of Wales Mine was located on the same property as the Queen, as were the Buffalo and South Buffalo. Together, they made up the "Queen group".) (Note: The four mines were owned by Mary Breitung, doing business as the Arctic Iron Co. Buffalo Mining held a number of leases, including the Buffalo, Queen, and South Buffalo. Corrigan, Ives & Co. had advanced large sums of money to Ferdinand Schlesinger and his Buffalo Mining Co., which had the leases on these mines. Initially, the press reported that Buffalo Mining owed CI&C more than $2 million (equivalent to $62,273,000 in 2024), but the actual amount owed was $420,000 (equivalent to $13,077,000 in 2024). Others creditors had filed claims with the court first, however, so the company and its assets were liquidated to pay these debts. Corrigan, Ives paid Buffalo Mining Co. $353,511 (equivalent to $11,433,000 in 2024) for the leases, $85,089 (equivalent to $2,752,000 in 2024) for its mining equipment, and $1,000 (equivalent to $32,000 in 2024) for ore already mined.) and purchased the Sunday Lake Mine in February 1894. (Note: Corrigan, Ives won a court judgment against the bankrupt Sunday Lake & Gogebic Co. It then purchased the Sunday Lake Mine at a sheriff's sale.) Corrigan, McKinney & Co. obtained ownership of the bankrupt Buffalo Mining Co., reorganized it, and assigned it as the operator of the Buffalo Mine.

== Corrigan, McKinney & Co.'s early mining activities ==
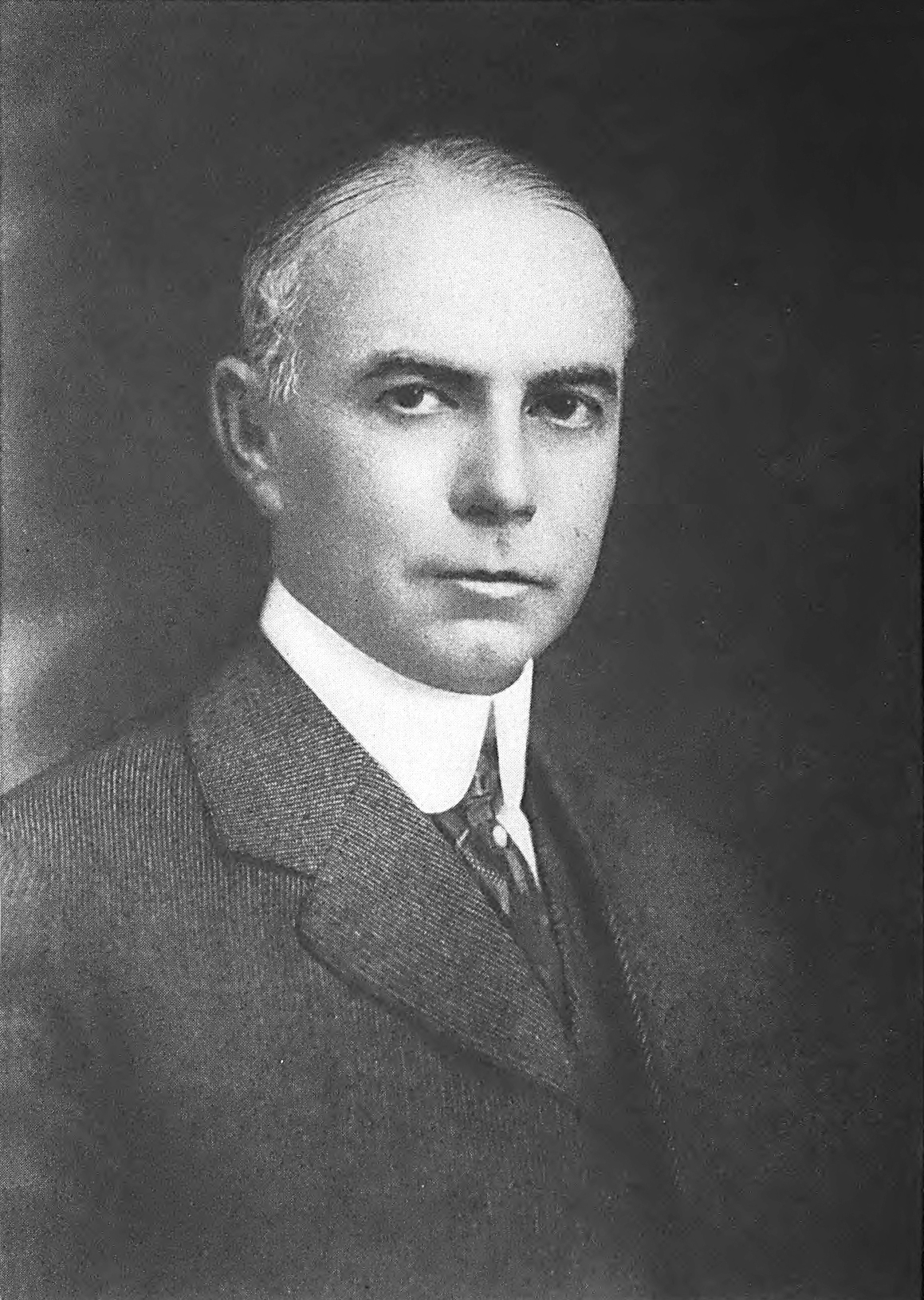
Price McKinney in 1926

=== 1894 to 1908 ===
Corrigan, Ives & Co. was reorganized as Corrigan, McKinney & Co. on March 15, 1894. Franklin T. Ives left the firm, and Price McKinney joined as a partner.

Six days after its organization, Corrigan, McKinney, & Co. incorporated the Queen Iron Mining Co. (Note: It operated the Prince of Wales, Queen, and South Buffalo mines.) and the Sunday Lake Mining Co. (Note: It operated the Sunday Lake Mine.) to operate mines on its behalf. The company soon leased the Dunn Mine and the Dunn Mining Co. to operate it.

In 1895 and 1896, Corrigan, McKinney & Co. leased or purchased five mines on the Mesabi Range, five mines on the Gogebic Range, and one mine each on the Marquette and Menominee ranges.

Some retrenchment occurred in 1897 and 1898, as it closed four mines on the Gogebic, three mines on the Mesabi, and one mine on the Marquette. It added only a single new mine, on the Gogebic Range, during this same period.

=== Becoming the third largest iron ore producer in America ===
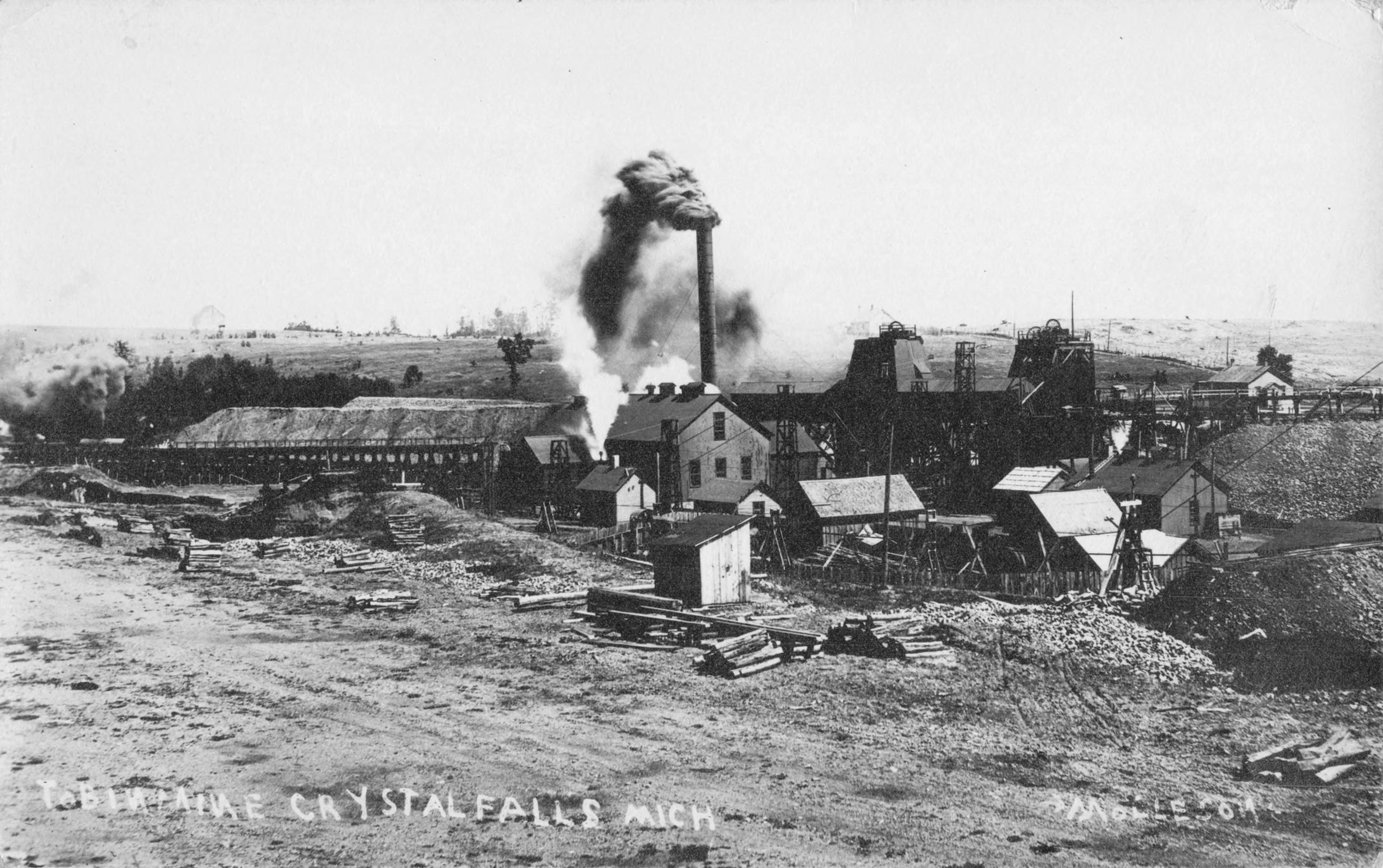
The Tobin Mine, one of Corrigan, McKinney & Co.'s best and longest producing iron ore mines, in 1912

In 1898 and 1899, Corrigan, McKinney & Co. purchased or leased nine mines on the Menominee Range, four mines on the Gogebic, and one mine on the Marquette. It also closed four mines on the Marquette Range. The company also leased or purchased thousands of acres of land for ore exploration.

In this initial four-year period, Corrigan, McKinney & Co. organized seven new subsidiary companies to operate its mines.

Despite the purchase or lease of nearly 40 iron mines and ore-bearing properties throughout the Midwest after 1894, many of these properties were not producing. By March 1900, Corrigan, McKinney & Co. was only operating three mines on the Mesabi, five on the Gogebic, and eight on the Menominee. Even so, by the end of the year, Corrigan, McKinney & Co. was one of the top three independent producers of iron ore, along with Cleveland Cliffs Iron and John D. Rockefeller's Lake Superior Mining Co. (U.S. Steel was far and away the largest producer of iron ore in the Great Lakes region.) It also left CM&C with the third most extensive iron ore holdings in Midwest; only U.S. Steel and the Rockefeller trust controlled more.

From 1901 to 1908, Corrigan, McKinney & Co. purchased or leased five mines on the Menominee, and four mines on the Mesabi. It incorporated two new subsidiaries to operate them. It sold or closed four mines on the Menominee, two on the Mesabi, and one mine each on the Gogebic and Marquette ranges. It also leased much land for exploration.

Corrigan, McKinney was the third-largest producer of iron ore in the United States in 1901, The Plain Dealer newspaper called Corrigan, McKinney's influence over the iron ore trade "enormous" in May 1902. With U.S. Steel using the output of its mines solely for its own benefit, CM&C set the price for iron ore sold by independent companies in the U.S., due to its large mines on the Gogebic, Menominee, and Mesabi ranges. It retained that title through 1906. By the end of 1908, Corrigan, McKinney & Co. was still one of the top four independent iron ore producers in the world. (The others were Cleveland Cliffs, M.A. Hanna, and Pickands Mather.)

== Gold and copper mining activities ==
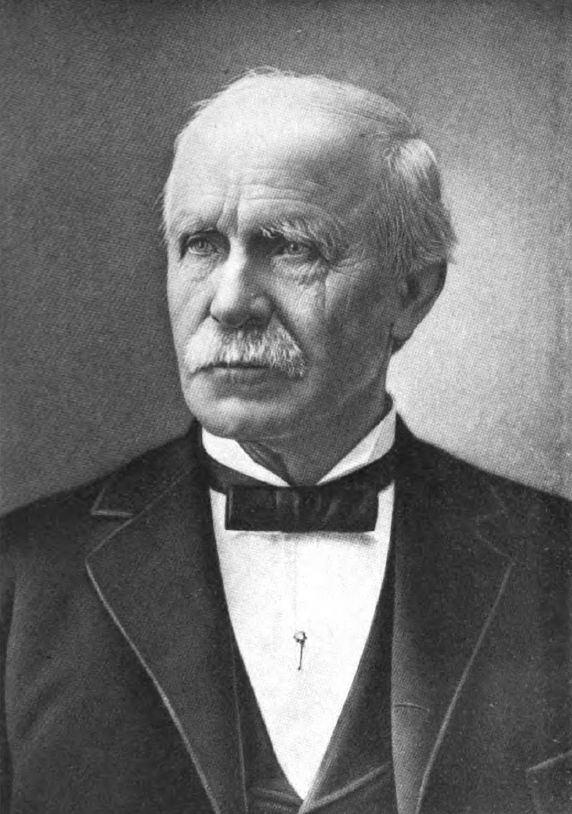
Stevenson Burke, silent partner in Corrigan, McKinney

=== Concheno gold mine, Mexico ===
In April 1895, bankrupt Wisconsin mine owner Ferdinand Schlesinger was forced to sell most of his properties. He sold his El Concheno gold and silver mine in the Mexican state of Chihuahua to Corrigan, McKinney & Co. (Note: The mine was located 80 miles (130 km) west of Temósachic on the Mexico North Western Railway.) The new owner funded the construction of a railroad spur to the mine, and added crushers and a mill.

Corrigan, McKinney & Co. sold the mine in December 1906 for $1.25 ($44,800,000 in 2025 dollars) to Greene Gold-Silver, a mining firm owned by William Cornell Greene. Greene Gold-Silver defaulted on its payments in December 1908, and Corrigan, McKinney repossessed the property. Corrigan, McKinney continued to operate the mine.

=== Ropes gold mine, Michigan ===
In January 1903, Corrigan, McKinney & Co. purchased the long unworked Ropes Gold Mine at the west end of Deer Lake in Marquette County, Michigan. The purchase price was $12,500 (equivalent to $386,000 in 2024) for the mine, and $2,600 (equivalent to $80,000 in 2024) for the plant and machinery.

Abandoned on the site was $25,000 (equivalent to $773,000 in 2024) worth of machinery in good condition. The former owners had also abandoned amalgamating plates (Note: A flat metal surface on which mercury is spread so it will bind with gold particles as gold-bearing ore is washed over it.) on which $30,000 to $50,000 in gold was found (equivalent to $927,000 in 2024 to equivalent to $1,545,000 in 2024). The discarded mine tailings contained another $90,000 to $200,000 in (equivalent to $6,181,000 in 2024) gold (equivalent to $2,782,000 in 2024 to equivalent to $6,181,000 in 2024). The company finished extracting what it could from the Ropes mine in 1914, and sold the machinery and buildings.

=== San Rafael and Rio Tinto copper mines, Mexico ===
In August 1907, Corrigan, McKinney & Co. purchased the San Rafael copper mine for $50,000 (equivalent to $1,225,000 in 2024). In September 1908, it purchased the nearby Rio Tinto copper mine for $187,000 (equivalent to $4,592,000 in 2024). This property included a smelter. Both properties were located about 25 miles (40 km) north of Chihuahua City.

In December 1912, during the Yaqui Wars, members of the Yaqui First Peoples tribe attacked the San Rafael mine, but were repelled by cavalry of the Mexican Army.

== 1903 death of Stevenson Burke ==
In the 1894 reorganization of Corrigan, McKinney & Co., James C. Corrigan owned 40% of the stock. Initially, Stevenson Burke owned 30%, and Price McKinney the remaining 30%.

Burke died in April 1904, and his stock was divided among his heirs: 13.75% went to his grandson, E. Stevenson Burke Jr.; 8.75% went to his granddaughter, Parthenia Burke Ross; and 7.5% went to his wife, Ella Burke. (Note: Many news sources inaccurately reported Parthenia Burke Ross's share to be 2 or 3 percent.) All three could vote and sell their shares.

== Shipping fleet ==
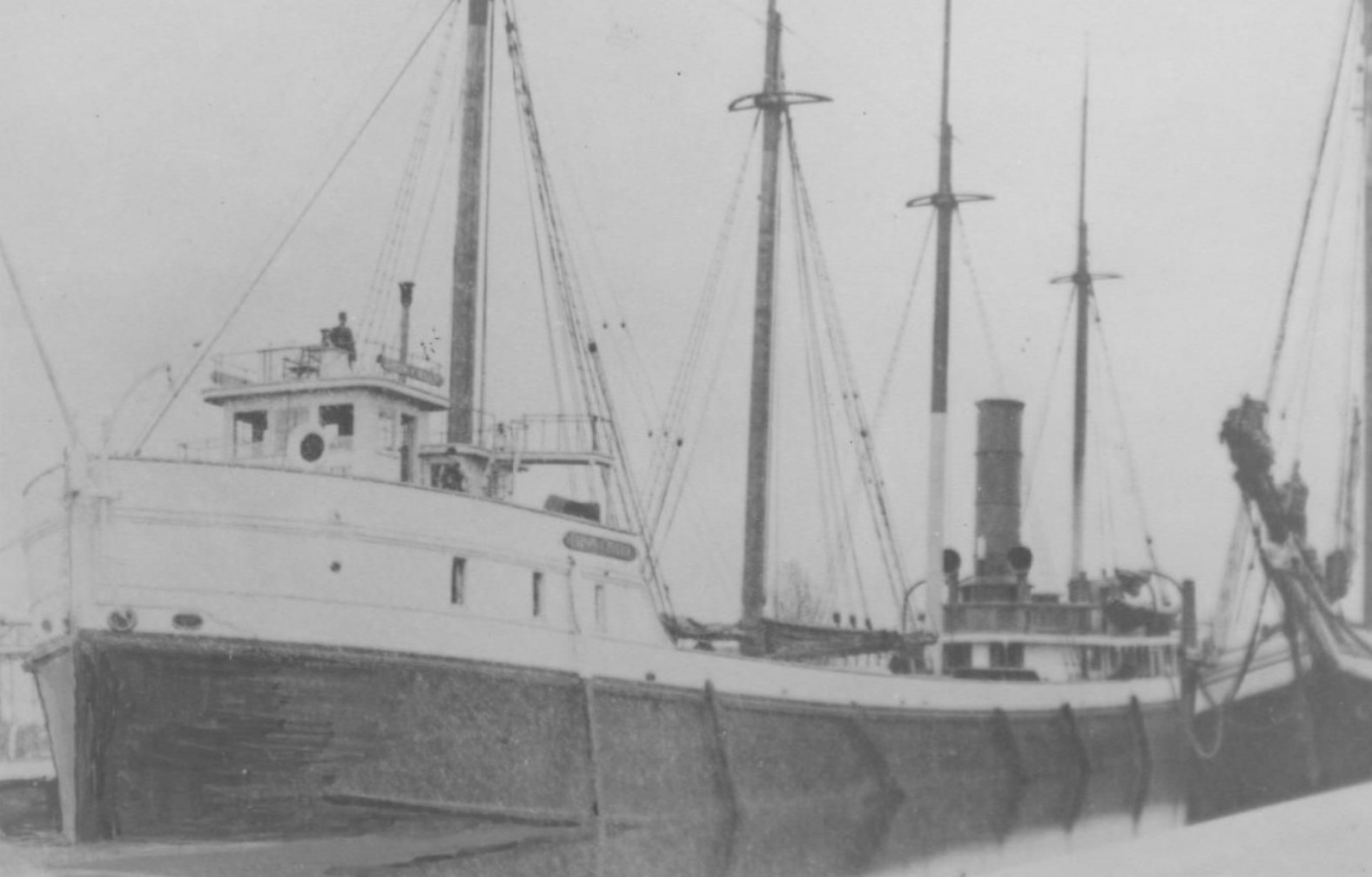
The Iron Chief, one of Corrigan, McKinney's many ships

Corrigan, McKinney & Co. began building its shipping fleet with the steel barge Polynesia, which launched in June 1897. Two others, then both the largest steel barges on the Great Lakes, the Amazon and the Australia, followed. In 1899, Corrigan, McKinney rapidly expanded its shipping fleet, purchasing 17 more boats. It made the Corrigan, McKinney fleet one of the largest on the Great Lakes. Two more vessels were added in 1900, bringing the firm's expenditure on shipping boats to $3 million (equivalent to $92,719,000 in 2024) in building its fleet.

Corrigan, McKinney fleet lost three ships in 1900, two in 1901, two in 1902, two in 1903, and two in 1904. At the end of 1905, having sold two ships and losing two more, Corrigan, McKinney & Co. decided to gradually wind down its shipping business.

In 1906 and 1907, the company sold four more ships. This left it with just its three original steel barges. Corrigan, McKinney & Co. sold these last three vessels in February 1915.

== Involvement in pig iron production ==
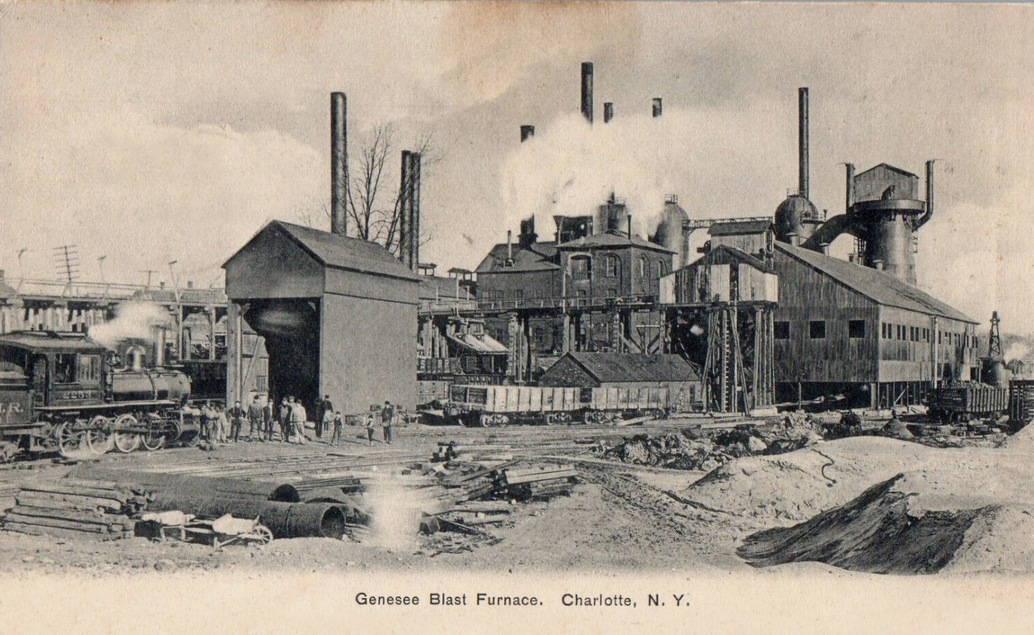
Corrigan, McKinney & Co.'s Genesee Furnace after its 1908 upgrades.

By 1905, Corrigan, McKinney & Co. owned one of the largest group of blast furnaces in the country. Even though the company was the second largest shipper of iron ore (only U.S. Steel was larger), it still had to purchase ore from other mines and dealers to keep its furnaces going.

Corrigan, McKinney & Co. moved into the manufacture of pig iron in 1894, leasing the River Furnace (Note: "Furnace" is short for blast furnace.) in Cleveland. The company incorporated the River Furnace and Dock Co. in March 1895 to operate the River Furnace. In February 1900, CM&C leased 1,200 feet (370 m) of waterfront to provide additional dock and storage space for the smelter. Corrigan, McKinney & Co. relinquished the lease on the River Furnace in August 1907.

Corrigan, McKinney & Co. obtained its second blast furnace, the Charlotte Furnace in Scottdale, Pennsylvania, in May 1895. Corrigan, McKinney incorporated a subsidiary, the Scottdale Furnace Company, in 1905 to operate the furnace. After a major explosion in February 1908, Corrigan, McKinney razed the existing structure, and built a new furnace at a cost of $250,000 ($9,000,000 in 2025 dollars). The Charlotte Furnace was idled from 1920 to 1922, and shut down permanently in 1925. Corrigan, McKinney surrendered its lease on January 10, 1026.

Corrigan, McKinney & Co. obtained the Douglas Furnace of Sharpsville, Pennsylvania, its third blast furnace, in 1896 after winning a judgement against the firm that owned it. The Carnegie Steel Company purchased the Douglas Furnace in 1895. When Corrigan, McKinney's lease expired on May 7, 1898, Carnegie Steel declined to renew it and took over the Douglas Furnace itself.

Corrigan, McKinney & Co.'s fourth blast was the Genesee Furnace of Charlotte, New York, which it purchased in June 1902. About $100,000 ($3,900,000 in 2025 dollars) was spent repairing and improving it. The company also purchased a limestone quarry near Le Roy, New York, and another at Gouverneur, New York, to provide limestone for smelting. Corrigan, McKinney incorporated the Genesee Furnace Company to operate the furnace in 1903. More improvements followed in 1903, in 1904, and in 1905. The cost of these three improvements was $566,000 ($20,300,000 in 2025 dollars). A major reconstruction occurred in 1908. The furnace closed in 1924. It reopened in August 1926, but only to use up the coal, iron ore, and limestone at the site and to melt down any obsolete machinery. The Genesee Furnace was permanently closed in April 1927.

Difficulties in obtaining a reliable supply of coke for its furnaces led Corrigan, McKinney to set up its own coking facility. In February 1903, it purchased between 4,000 acres (1,600 ha) to 6,000 acres (2,400 ha) of coal-bearing land in Pennsylvania. Corrigan and McKinney decided to build a blast furnace at nearby Bell's Mills in Indiana County, Pennsylvania. The company began construction on 165 new houses for its workers and managers. The new town was named Josephine, after the wife of Corrigan, McKinney stockholder Edward Burke. The Josephine Furnace was the first modern, coke-fired blast furnace in Western Pennsylvania. The Josephine Furnace Co. was incorporated by the company to run the coking facility. A second blast furnace, to cost $1 million ($34,600,000 in 2025 dollars), was erected there in April 1907. It built an ingot mill at the Josephine site in 1915. The Josephine Furnace Co. was dissolved in January 1918 when Corrigan, McKinney changed its name to the McKinney Steel Co. The plant shut down in mid 1912 and did not resume production again until January 1923. Limited repairs were made in December 1925, but both furnaces were shut down again in 1927 and never restarted. The Josephine Furnace was sold in June 1936.

== Going into steel production ==
=== Planning a Cleveland blast furnace ===
Corrigan, McKinney & Co. made public its decision not to renew its lease on Cleveland's River Furnace in December 1906.

James Corrigan and Price McKinney intended to build one or two new furnaces somewhere along the Cuyahoga River in Cleveland. In January 1907, their company began negotiating with the state of Ohio for a lease on 3 acres (1.2 ha) at the Weigh Lock, where the Ohio and Erie Canal began on the east bank of the Cuyahoga River. (Note: An extremely narrow and tight oxbow, jutting eastward, existed in the Cuyahoga River where Corrigan, McKinney intended to build its new blast furnaces. The Jefferson Street Bend was the head of navigation until 1906. The mayoral administration of Tom L. Johnson cut through a small peninsula in 1906 and eliminated the Jefferson Street Bend, making the new head of navigation a tight bend at Dille Road, about 0.5 miles (0.80 km) upriver. The Johnson administration exchanged property with landowners D.R. Taylor and John Giesendorfer and used eminent domain to seize a portion of the Lithe and Lillian Stone properties (the peninsula). It planned to cut through the peninsula and create a wide turning basin using part of the old river channel. Johnson's administration began excavation in 1905, and used removed soil to fill in the old channel of the Cuyahoga River. Johnson also spent $275,000 ($9,500,000 in 2025 dollars) to dredge 1 mile (1.6 km) of the Cuyahoga River up to the bend. This dredged material was also used to fill in the old channel of the river. Before the work could be completed, Johnson lost re-election on November 3, 1909. Herman C. Baehr served only a single, two-year term as mayor of Cleveland, but he completed the new river channel and turning basin. The State of Ohio retained the 3 acres (1.2 ha) of the old channel, which was now reclaimed land.) The state leased only 2 acres (0.81 ha) to the company, so Corrigan, McKinney purchased another 40 acres (16 ha) south of the state land in January and February 1907.

=== Decision to build a small steel mill ===
Some time later in 1907, Corrigan, McKinney & Co. executives decided that a larger blast furnace complex was needed.

The firm now began negotiating with landowners on the west side of the Cuyahoga River between Houston Street on the north and Clark Avenue on the south, and by early August 1908 had secured 40 acres (16 ha) of land, from the Cuyahoga River west to the Wheeling and Lake Erie Railroad and the Newburgh and South Shore Railroad.

On July 31, 1908, the company announced that it would build a much larger facility consisting of at least two pig iron blast furnaces and a steel plate mill capable of producing 200,000 short tons (180,000 t) a year. The cost of the plant would be at least $2.5 million ($89,600,000 in 2025 dollars). Ground clearance and grading on the western 40 acres began on August 1, 1908.

== Death of James C. Corrigan ==
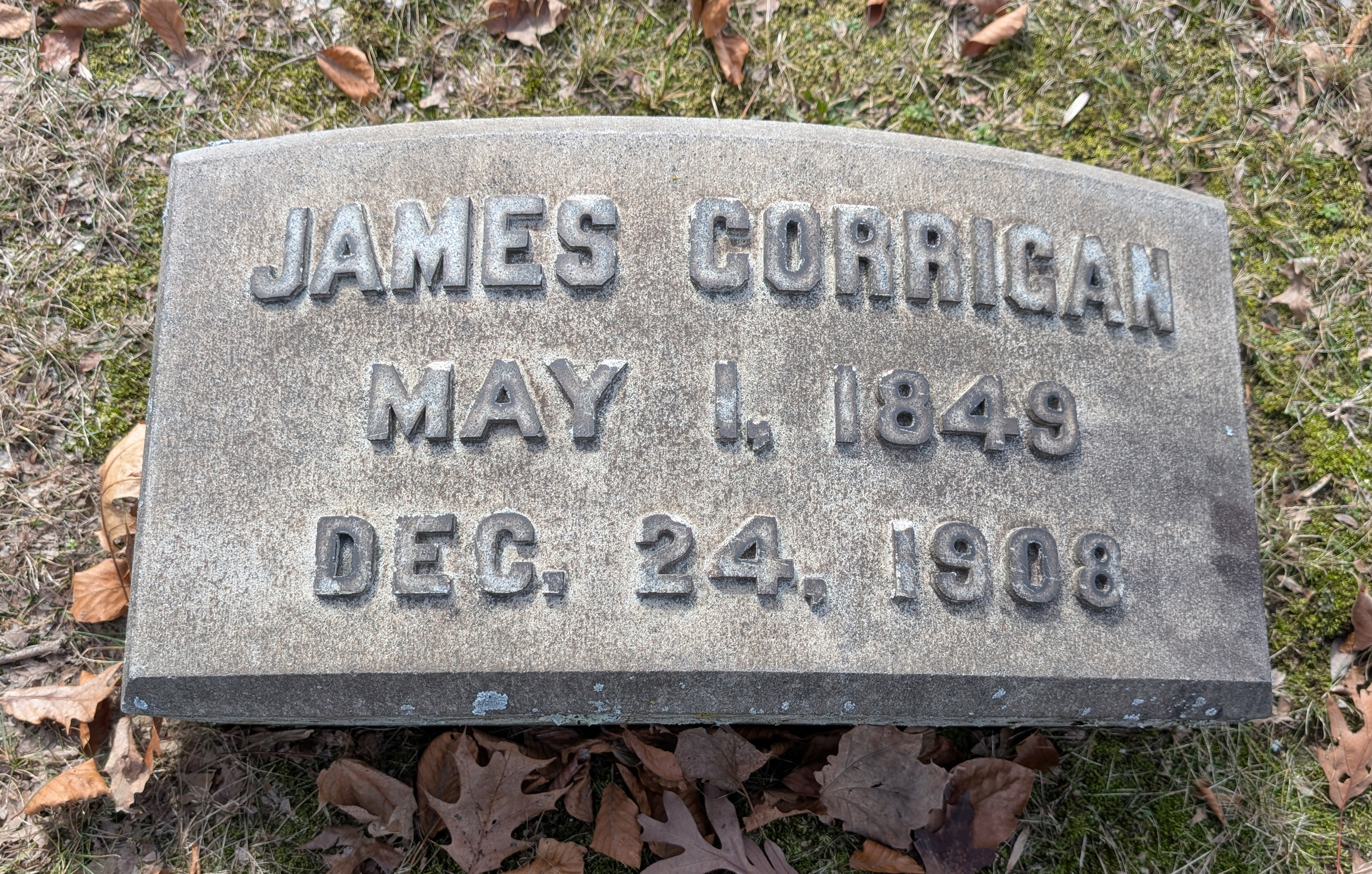
Grave of James C. Corrigan

In late December 1908, Corrigan was diagnosed with appendicitis. He underwent an appendectomy on December 24, but there were complications from the surgery and he died on December 24, 1908.

Corrigan's will left his shares in Corrigan, McKinney & Co. to his son, James W. Corrigan (known as Jimmie). Jimmie had shown little interest in the firm for years, and had for only a short time been in charge of Corrigan, McKinney & Co.'s mining operations in Mexico and the Genesee Furnace. The trustees were Price McKinney and J.E. Ferris (treasurer of Corrigan, McKinney & Co.). If the trustees felt Jimmie Corrigan was unfit to assume control of the company, they could unilaterally extend the trust another five years.

The trust effectively put Price McKinney in control of Corrigan, McKinney & Co.

== Corrigan, McKinney under Price McKinney ==
=== Building Cleveland's largest steel plant ===
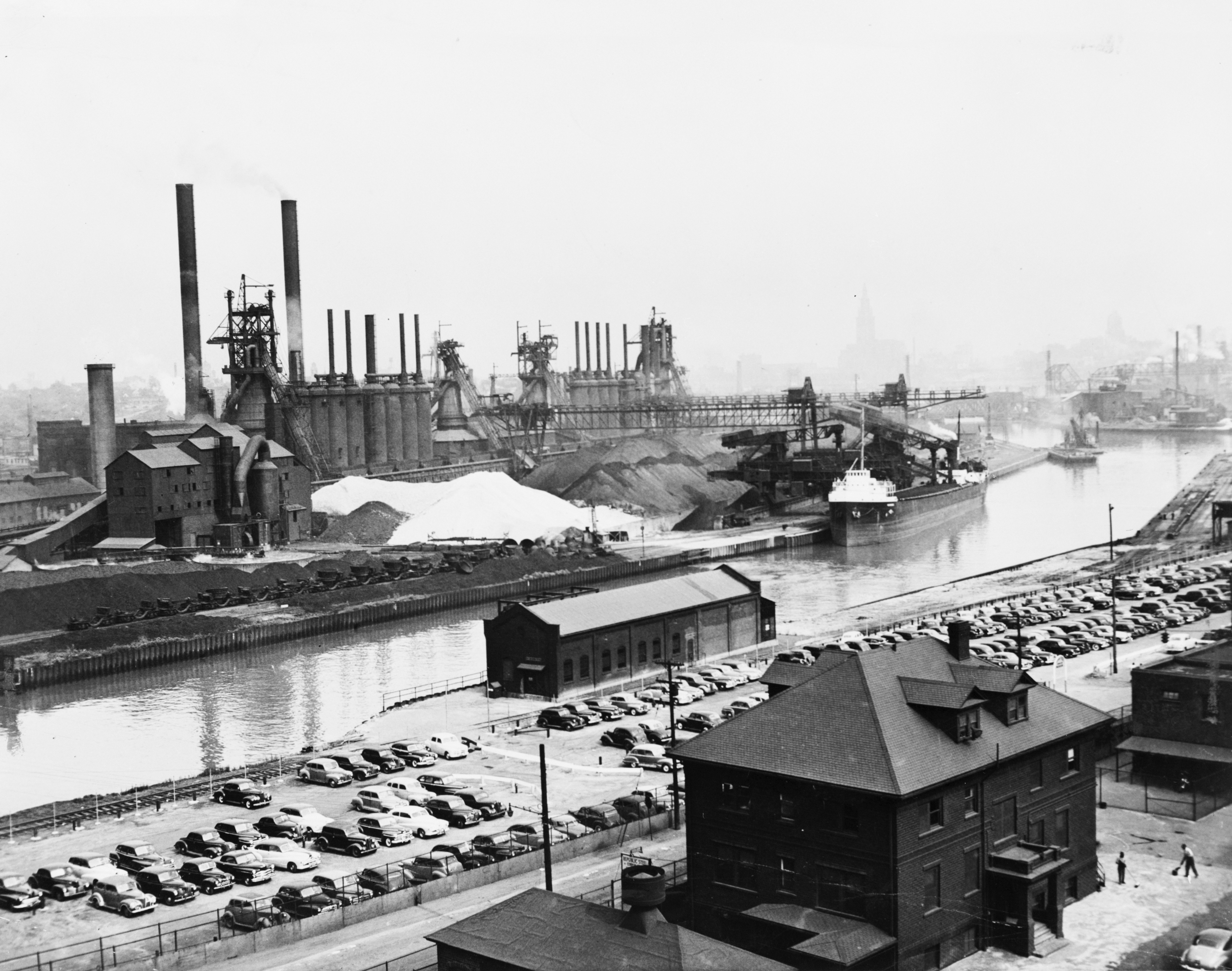
Corrigan, McKinney Steel works

Corrigan, McKinney & Co. declared that the death of James C. Corrigan would have no impact on its decision to build two blast furnaces on the west bank of the Cuyahoga River between Clark and Houston avenues. A contract for the first, $100,000 furnace (equivalent to $2,490,000 in 2024) was let at the end of March 1909, but by April the company said its first furnace would be much larger and cost $300,000 (equivalent to $7,469,000 in 2024). Corrigan, McKinney originally said it would begin construction on the second furnace in 1910. By September 1900, however, the company's plans had grown: It now said it would rush construction on the second stack, and build four furnaces at a total cost of $3 million (equivalent to $74,690,000 in 2024). (Note: Space for the two additional furnaces consisted of 22.5 acres (9.1 ha) acquired in July and August 1909. Another 5 acres (2.0 ha) was acquired in March 1911, and another 2.5 acres (1.0 ha) in May 1915. This brought the company's total west side acreage to more than 70 acres (28 ha).)

In December 1909, Corrigan, McKinney & Co. incorporated a subsidiary, the River Terminal Railway. This was a shortline railroad to link the ore docks at the mouth of the Cuyahoga River to its furnaces.

Corrigan, McKinney's first blast furnace was blown in at the end of May 1910, and the second furnace was nearing completion. (It was blown in on June 20, 1912.)

The company decided to expand its presence on the east side of the Cuyahoga River probably in the spring or summer of 1910. Its first move came in October and November 1911, when it purchased 40 acres (16 ha) of property. Just two weeks after the last of these land acquisitions, Corrigan, McKinney & Co. announced it would spend $1.5 million to erect a steel mill consisting of eight open-hearth furnaces capable of producing more than 1,000 short tons (910 t) of semi-finished billets, sheet bar, and slabs. The company decided to double the size of this steel mill in February 1912, Between October 1912 and February 1913, it purchased 118 acres (48 ha) on the east side of the Cuyahoga River from Dille Avenue south to Pershing Avenue, and east roughly to Colorado Street. (Note: Corrigan, McKinney attempted to expand further south by acquiring the 20.8 acres (8.4 ha) Wilson property in November 1913. It tried to obtain the George Gynn property to connect the William Harrison Subdivision land (acquired in February 1913) to the Wilson land, but failed to do so. To try to encourage nearby landholders to sell, Corrigan, McKinney acquired 9.5 acres (3.8 ha) of land southwest of the Wheeling & Lake Erie Railway tracks the Stanley estate and 18 acres (7.3 ha) of the Eggers Allotment, an undeveloped property that surrounded E. 49th Street. It purchased 11.5 acres (4.7 ha) east of the Eggers Allotment land from the Stanley estate in October 1918. Republic Steel, Corrigan, McKinney Steel's successor, eventually purchased the Gynn property in August 1956.)

To connect its east and west side facilities, Corrigan, McKinney & Co. built the River Terminal Railway lift bridge over the Cuyahoga River in 1913.

Construction on the steel mill began in July 1913. To power the four blast furnaces and the steel mill, the company built a power house on the west bank of the Cuyahoga River in 1915. Construction on the final two blast furnaces and the steel mill progressed slowly throughout 1915 due to poor demand for steel, which curtailed Corrigan, McKinney's revenue, but the mill finally began making steel on January 20, 1915.

All told, Corrigan, McKinney built two 350 short tons (320 t) pig iron blast furnaces, two 500 short tons (450 t) pig iron blast furnaces, 14 80-short-ton (73 t) open-hearth steel furnaces, 204 coke ovens, a blooming mill that produced 40-inch (1,000 mm) wide ingots, and a bar mill that produced both 18-inch (460 mm) and 21-inch (530 mm) billet, slabs, and sheet bar. (Note: An ingot with a section 6 square inches (39 cm^{2}) or larger is a bloom. A bloom rolled to a flat section not less than 2 inches (51 mm) square or round and a width of at least 12 inches (300 mm) is a slab. A bloom rolled to 1.5 inches (38 mm) square or round and cut into lengths is a billet. A bloom rolled to a thickness of less than 2 inches (51 mm) and a width from 6 to 12 inches (150 to 300 mm) is a sheet bar.) The third blast furnace was blown in on May 13, 1916, and the fourth on December 30, 1916.

By early 1925, the company was building a finishing mill intended to bring annual capacity to 1,000,000 short tons (910,000 t) a year.

=== Mining under McKinney ===
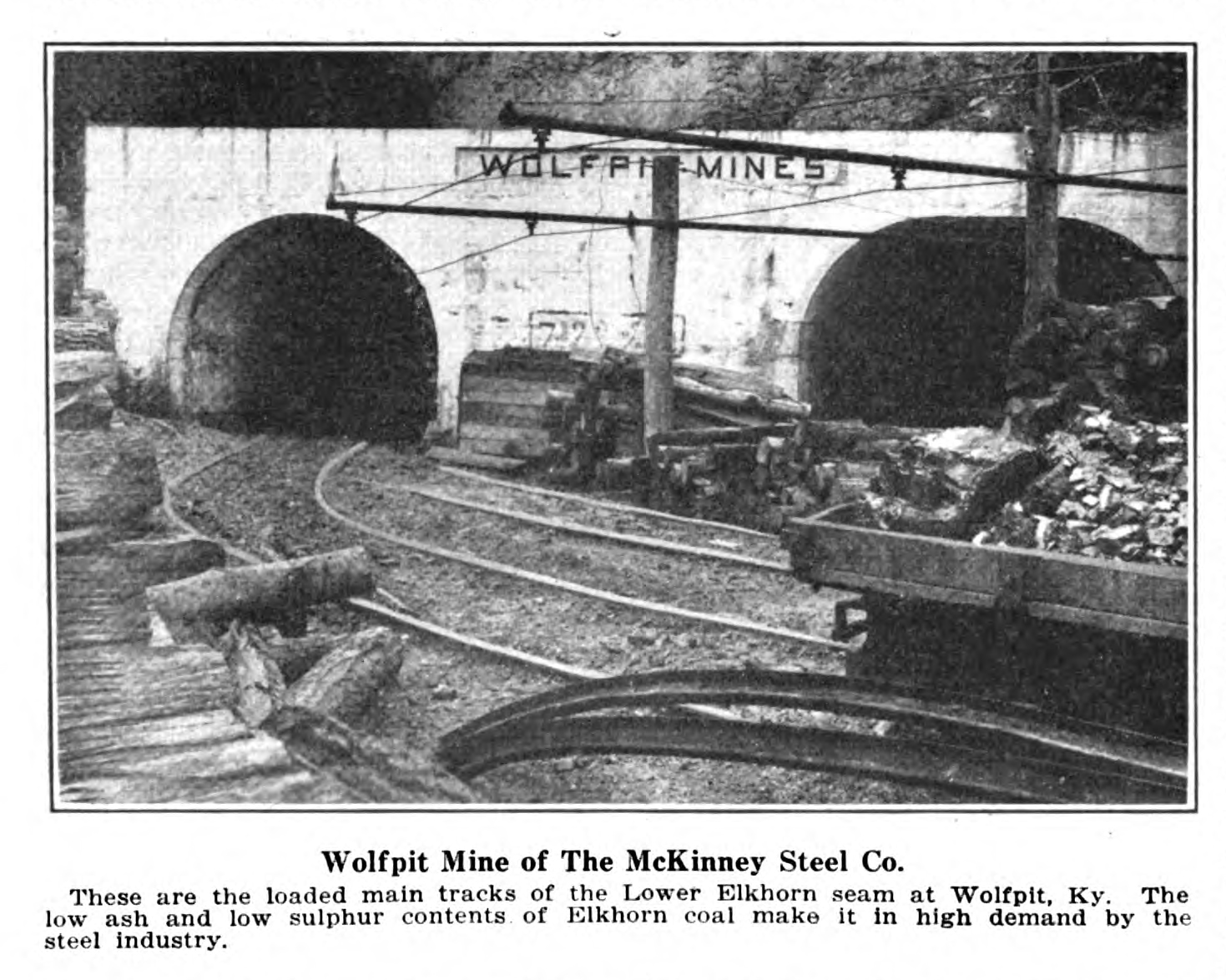
The Wolfpit Mine, one of McKinney Steel's largest coal mines in Kentucky

From 1909 to 1919, Corrigan, McKinney & Co. closed seven mines, leased one new mine, and incorporated a new mining subsidiary. It also leased land for exploration.

About June 1917, Corrigan, McKinney & Co. leased a large amount of coal-bearing land in the Eastern Kentucky Coalfield. By 1904, the firm controlled 130,000 acres (53,000 ha) of coal-bearing land in the state. By 1911, the company controlled only 100,000 acres (40,000 ha), and by 1916 this had shrunk to 49,000 acres (20,000 ha). These holdings may have dropped to 41,500 acres (16,800 ha) by the end of 1916, due to the sale of 3,000 acres (1,200 ha) and the loss of 5,900 acres (2,400 ha) due to a legal dispute over title.

McKinney Steel (as the company was called after January 1, 1918) broke ground on the Wolfpit Mine, located near the confluence of Marrowbone Creek and the Left Fork of Wolfpit Branch, in September 1917. By May 1919, McKinney Steel had opened a second mine in Kentucky on nearby Greasy Creek. It closed the Greasy Creek mine in March 1928, and the Wolfpit Mine in September 1928.

The post-war recession of 1920–1921 was steep, and McKinney Steel closed all its iron ore mines beginning in January 1921. Mine workers were only rehired in October 1921 after the recession eased. By May 1922, all of McKinney Steel's iron mines had reopened, except for the Colby.

=== Change of name: McKinney Steel ===
According to The Plain Dealer newspaper in Cleveland, Price McKinney's salary was $200,000 ($5,000,000 in 2025 dollars) in 1917. That year, Corrigan, McKinney & Co. had gross revenue of $60 million ($1,507,800,000 in 2025 dollars), and a gross profit of $16 million ($402,100,000 in 2025 dollars).

For reasons never made public, Price McKinney decided to change the name of the firm to McKinney Steel Company. The alteration occurred on January 1, 1918, and was first reported on January 5. The partnership of Corrigan, McKinney & Co. was dissolved, and all of its assets were turned over to the new McKinney Steel. The percentage of shares owned by Jimmie Corrigan, Price McKinney, E. Stevenson Burke Jr., Parthenia Burke Ross, and Ella Burke remained identical to their ownership shares in the old partnership.

=== Dissolution of the Corrigan trust ===
In the fall of 1918, James W. "Jimmie" Corrigan requested a report on the financial status of the trust holding his shares of McKinney Steel. His father's will provided $1,200 ($0 in 2025 dollars) a month to cover expenses incurred by the trustees, but the report showed that Price McKinney alone had charged the trust $200,000 a year ($4,300,000 in 2025 dollars).

In December 1918, Jimmie Corrigan filed suit in Lake County probate court to have the trust dissolved. Corrigan was upset that the firm's name had been changed, and felt Price McKinney was trying to freeze him out of all management decisions. He believed McKinney disapproved of his December 1916 marriage to Chicago divorcée Laura Mae MacMartin, and that McKinney was upset that Corrigan had disinherited McKinney's children in favor of his new wife. (Note: Duncan R. MacMartin was the "house physician" at the Great Northern Hotel in Chicago, Illinois. He had married Laura Mae Whitlock, a waitress, in 1907. The couple separated in 1910, although they kept this a secret and continued to socialize as a couple. It is unclear when Jimmie Corrigan became acquainted with the MacMartins, but they were guests at his Dry Island, New York, summer home in September 1913. Jimmie and Laura Mae began a relationship at that time. Laura Mae filed for divorce in November 1914, and it was granted in 1915. Jimmie Corrigan married Laura Mae MacMartin on December 2, 1916, in New York City.)

In his lawsuit, Corrigan accused the trustees of charging excessive management fees, argued that J.E. Ferris was not an independent trustee but rather acted as a rubber-stamp for Price McKinney, and that Price McKinney had embezzled $100,000 ($1,900,000 in 2025 dollars) from the trust. McKinney countered that Jimmie Corrigan had approved the withdrawal of $100,000 as a loan. The lawsuit was settled out of court, with McKinney and Ferris voluntarily relinquishing their administration of the trust. With the initial 10-year period having lapsed, James W. Corrigan now came into full possession of his $25 million ($464,300,000 in 2025 dollars) inheritance and full control over his majority shares in McKinney Steel on January 24, 1919.

Jimmie Corrigan had no intention of becoming involved in McKinney Steel. He and his wife left Cleveland shortly thereafter and spent the next six years traveling in Europe. Under Price McKinney's leadership, the company was doing very well. Revenue in 1918 was up 170% to $100 million ($2,140,500,000 in 2025 dollars), and gross profit had risen to $17 million ($363,900,000 in 2025 dollars).

=== Steel and coal strikes of 1919 ===
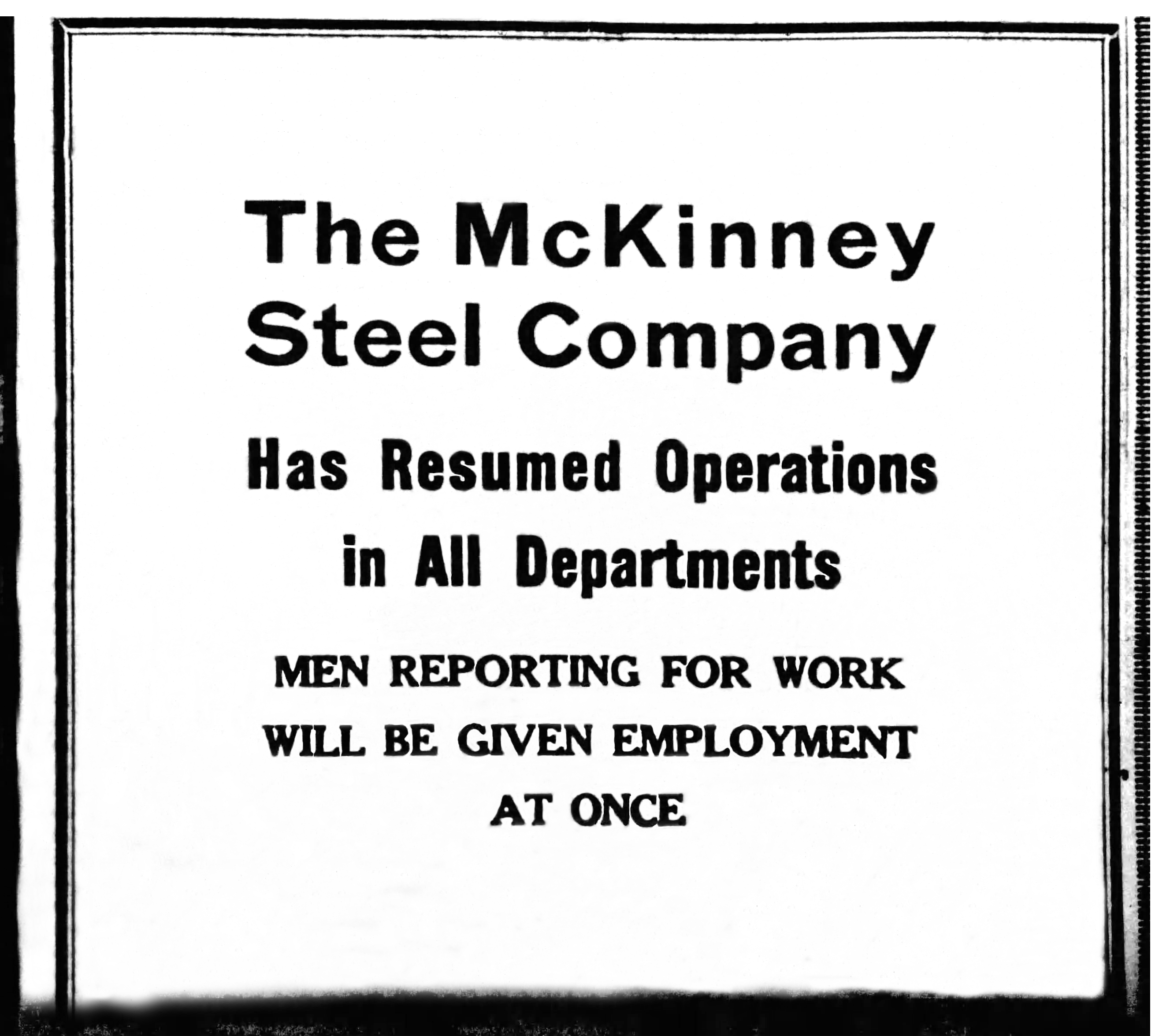
McKinney Steel advertisement announcing that nearly all its striking workers had voluntarily resumed their jobs (and the strike was broken).

By fall of 1919, McKinney Steel employed about 4,000 men in Cleveland. About 500 to 600 of them were working the four blast furnaces, while another 800 operated the company's 204 coke ovens. The remainder worked in the steel mill, operating the open hearth furnaces and rolling mills.

Between April 1917 (when the United States entered World War I) and April 1918, more than 3,500 strikes had occurred, disrupting the war effort. In April 1918, President Woodrow Wilson established the National War Labor Board to mediate disputes and bring an end to strikes and lockouts. The board lacked legal enforcement powers, and relied on public opinion and the president to enforce its orders.

After the war ended in November 1918, most American employers sought to return to the antebellum status quo of a nonunion workforce. Businesses with large workforces adopted an organized push to de-unionize. As the post-war recession worsened, union members and supporters were targeted for dismissal. Angry workers sought to push back against the de-unionization effort. The American Federation of Labor (AFL) tried to use worker unrest to build momentum for an organizing drive in the steel industry, but prohibited any strikes. Steelworkers became disillusioned. Seeing the chance for membership gains slipping away, the AFL and its member unions involved in the steel industry agreed to strike in August.

The 1919 general strike in steel began on September 22, 1919, and hit McKinney Steel among hundreds of iron and steel manufacturers. The company shut down its four Cleveland blast furnaces but none of its iron mines. McKinney Steel locked out its employees. But the strike began to wane by the second week of October, and the company ended the lockout by October 18. The AFL's primary steelworkers union, the Amalgamated Association of Iron and Steel Workers, claimed that none of its men went back to work, but the company reported that enough men had returned to work to put its mills back into partial operation.

By October 22, McKinney Steel had one blast furnace, two open hearth furnaces, and a battery of coke ovens operating.

A national coal miners' strike hit on November 1. Railroads started hoarding coal for their own use, citing "government necessity", and even McKinney Steel was short of coal. The company limited its steel operations due to lack of coal on December 7, but continued to operate its iron mines at full capacity.

By early January 1920, McKinney Steel was operating almost at full capacity again. Despite the ongoing national coal shortage created by the strike, the company was somehow able to divert coal from other essential industries to its own steel mill in Cleveland. All its coke ovens, blast furnaces, and open hearth furnaces were fully operating. About 90 percent of its workforce returned to work, with only common laborers staying away.

== Creation of McKinney Steel Holding ==
By the end of 1924, McKinney Steel Co. had net tangible assets worth $65.5 million and net assets worth $8.8 million, Average annual earnings after taxes for the past eight years was $1.8 million a year. (Note: This was 4.2 to 4.3 times the amount needed to pay the 6% divided on MHS preferred.) The average annual dividend over the past eight years was $2,375,000, although in 1923 it was $1 million. (Note: If accurate, press reports that dividend payments were much larger than net earnings implies that Corrigan, McKinney was engaging in dividend recapitalization (taking on debt to pay dividends).) The company had no debt (or, at least, no public debt), and until the creation of preferred stock in 1925 had put all earnings back into the company.

The McKinney Steel plant in Cleveland was widely considered the most efficient steel plant in the nation, and had more coke ovens than any other steel plant in Ohio.

=== Set-up of McKinney Steel Holding ===
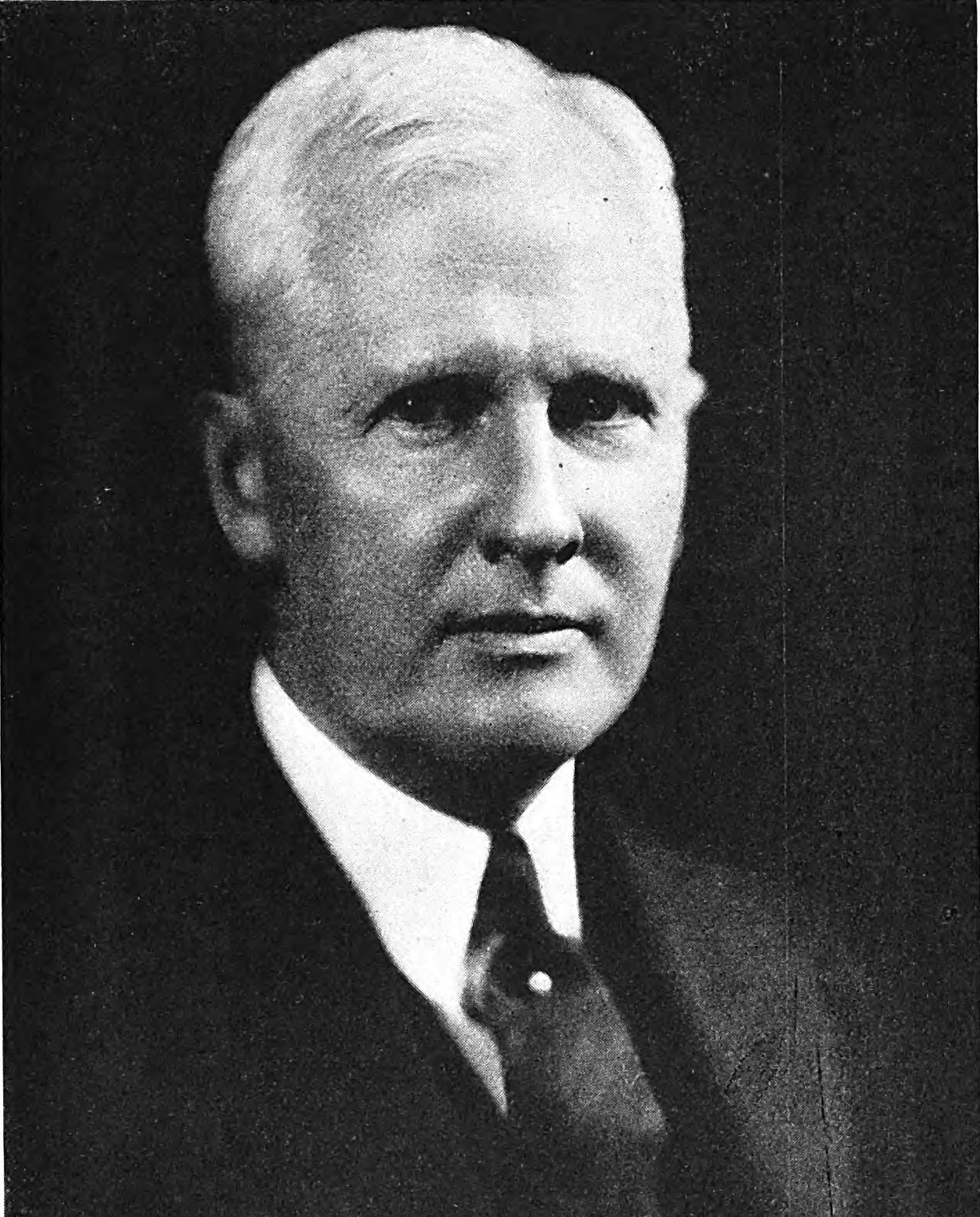
Joseph R. Nutt in 1928

In 1925, Joseph R. Nutt was president of the Union Trust Company, a Cleveland-based trust bank and one of the largest banks in the nation outside of New York City.

According to Nutt, in February 1925 E. Stevenson Burke Jr. approached Nutt and said he wished to sell his 13.75 percent of the stock of McKinney Steel. Nutt agreed to find a buyer, but told Burke that he represented James W. Corrigan on the steel company's board of directors. Therefore, the only person Nutt could contact was Corrigan. Corrigan told Nutt he was interested in buying more stock, but had no ready cash. Any purchase would have to be financed. Corrigan returned to the United Kingdom, (Note: A transatlantic crossing at the time took about 5 days, and Corrigan arrived in London on March 7.) so his attorney, John H. Watson, came up with the idea for financing the purchased. Corrigan approved the idea in early May 1925, and Watson and Nutt set it up.

After more negotiation, on May 1, Corrigan and Burke agreed on a price of $99.50 a share, or $7,250,000 ($133,100,000 in 2025 dollars).

A holding company, McKinney Steel Holding (MSH), was organized with capital of $8,500,000. MSH issued 72,500 shares of preferred stock at a par value of $100, which paid 6% dividends annually guaranteed. All the preferred stock was turned over to E. Stevenson Burke Jr. MSH also issued 10,000 shares of common stock, all of which was turned over to Jimmie Corrigan. Corrigan turned over his new 53.75% ownership interest in McKinney Steel to the Union Trust Co. as collateral, until such time as all preferred stock was repurchased by Corrigan. The call price of the preferred stock was $105.

There were several critical parts of the agreement. Preferred stock was non-voting, unless the company was six months in arrears on dividends. In that case, holders of preferred stock obtained exclusive voting power. Preferred dividends were cumulative if not paid, and accrued with interest. In the event MSH was dissolved or liquidated, all accrued preferred dividends were to be paid first. Then the preferred stock had to be redeemed at $105. The holders of MSH common could not approve a sale or merger of McKinney Steel until it had the approval of two-thirds of all preferred stock. Even then, in order to go ahead with any plan, MSH would have to redeem all preferred shares at $105 first. (Note: The terms of the trust also provided for the redemption of MHS preferred shares over time. Beginning March 27, 1927, Union Trust could apply 75 percent of all MHS profits to redemption of the preferred shares at $105 or less. However, it had to pay taxes, the 6% divided on MHS preferred, and a dividend of $500,000 on MHS common first.)

Burke authorized the sale of his McKinney Steel stock on May 6. MSH transferred the 72,500 shares of MSH preferred to Burke on May 13, finalizing the deal.

=== Burke's sale of preferred stock ===
E. Stevenson Burke Jr. wished to sell his shares of MHS preferred immediately for cash. Burke advised Nutt of his intentions during the negotiation process, and asked him to find a buyer. The Union Trust Co. itself agreed to buy all of Burke's MSH preferred for $6.5 million (at $89.655 a share). Burke received his cash on May 16, finalizing the transaction. According to Nutt, Jimmie Corrigan was fully aware of Burke's intention to sell his preferred stock to the bank, and both Corrigan and Burke were pleased with the final outcomes.

The bank began slowly selling shares to the public, at $100 a share. (Note: State law prevented the Union Trust Co. from owning stocks. The bank sold its McKinney Steel Holding preferred at $93 a share to an internal unit informally called "the Bond Department". This allowed the bank to record a paper profit. The "Bond Department" then offered the stock at $93 to special clients, known as the "Purchase Group". The "Purchase Group" then sold the stock at $95.50 to another bank-organized group of special clients, known as the "Special Purchase Group". The "Special Purpose Group" then sold the stock at $96.50 to yet another Union Trust-organized group, known as the "Banking Group" because it consisted of other banks. The "Banking Group" then sold to the "Selling Group" at $96.50. The "Selling Group" consisted of Cleveland area investment banks Hayden, Miller & Co.; The Herrick Co.; Hord, Curtiss & Co.; R.V. Mitchell & Co., and Otis & Co., and the New York City-based investment bank of Clark, Dodge & Co. The "Selling Group" sold the stock to the public at $100 a share beginning on May 21, 1925. The stock was oversubscribed locally and in New York City, with trust funds taking many large blocs of shares. It was not until July 24, 1929, that the bank organized a subsidiary, the Union Cleveland Corporation, to act as its investment company and legally hold stock in other companies.)

=== Jimmie Corrigan becomes president of McKinney Steel ===
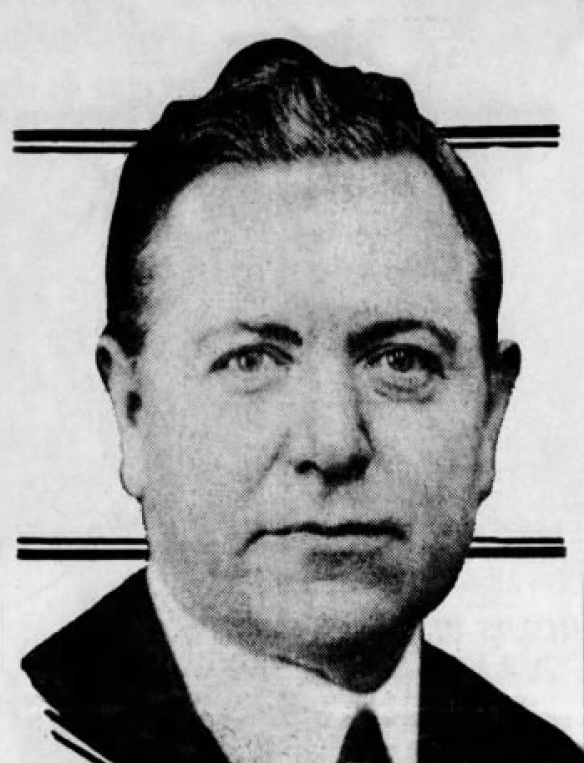
James W. "Jimmie" Corrigan

On May 18, McKinney Steel Holding held its organization meeting and adopted a constitution and bylaws. James W. Corrigan was elected president of the holding company, and Price McKinney was named president of McKinney Steel.

Two days after the MHS organizing meeting, the board of directors of McKinney Steel asked for the resignation of Price McKinney as president of McKinney Steel. McKinney complied, although he retained his MSH board seat. Corrigan was then named president of McKinney Steel. The board appointed Henry T. Harrison, designer of the steel mill and its chief engineer, as the plant's new general operating manager. After the meeting, Corrigan said he would make no changes to the corporate strategy or operating procedures established by Price McKinney.

Corrigan's ascension to the presidency of McKinney Steel sparked widespread speculation that the company would soon merge with one or more independent steel makers. Middletown-based American Rolling Mills, Cleveland-based Otis Steel, and Warren-based Trumbull Steel were considered among the most likely merger partners. Sheet and strip steel makers like Ashtabula Steel, Chicago-based Central Steel, Mansfield Sheet and Tin Plate, and Warren-based Newton Steel, as well as rolling mills like Cleveland-based Bourne-Fuller, Elyria-based Steel and Tubes, Inc., Springfield-based Falcon Steel, Mahoning Valley Steel, and Warren-based Thomas Sheet Steel, were also considered likely partners. There were even rumors that McKinney Steel might agree to be purchased by one of the larger steel firms, like Bethlehem Steel, Inland Steel, Republic Steel & Iron, or Youngstown Sheet and Tube. Jimmie Corrigan denied every single merger rumor.

== James W. Corrigan era ==
=== McKinney Steel in 1925 ===
Mining activities under James W. Corrigan were limited. In Michigan, the company was only operating the Ironton, Ira Odgers, and Tobin mines near Crystal Falls. A drift about 1-mile (1.6 km) long was constructed underground to link the Ira Odgers and Tobin mines. In Minnesota, it operated only the Commodore, St. Paul, and Stevenson after permanently closing the St. James in January and abandoning the property in March. (Note: This meant McKinney Steel operated only three of the 61 working iron mines in Minnesota.) The company was mining so little ore in 1925 that it finally closed its Pittsburgh offices in September 1925. Still, it shipped 1,117,435 short tons (1,013,720 t) of iron ore in 1925.

Corrigan, McKinney Steel reported net earnings for 1925 of $2.2 million ($40,400,000 in 2025 dollars). It paid $1.2 million ($22,000,000 in 2025 dollars) in dividends.

=== 1926 suicide of Price McKinney and corporate renaming ===
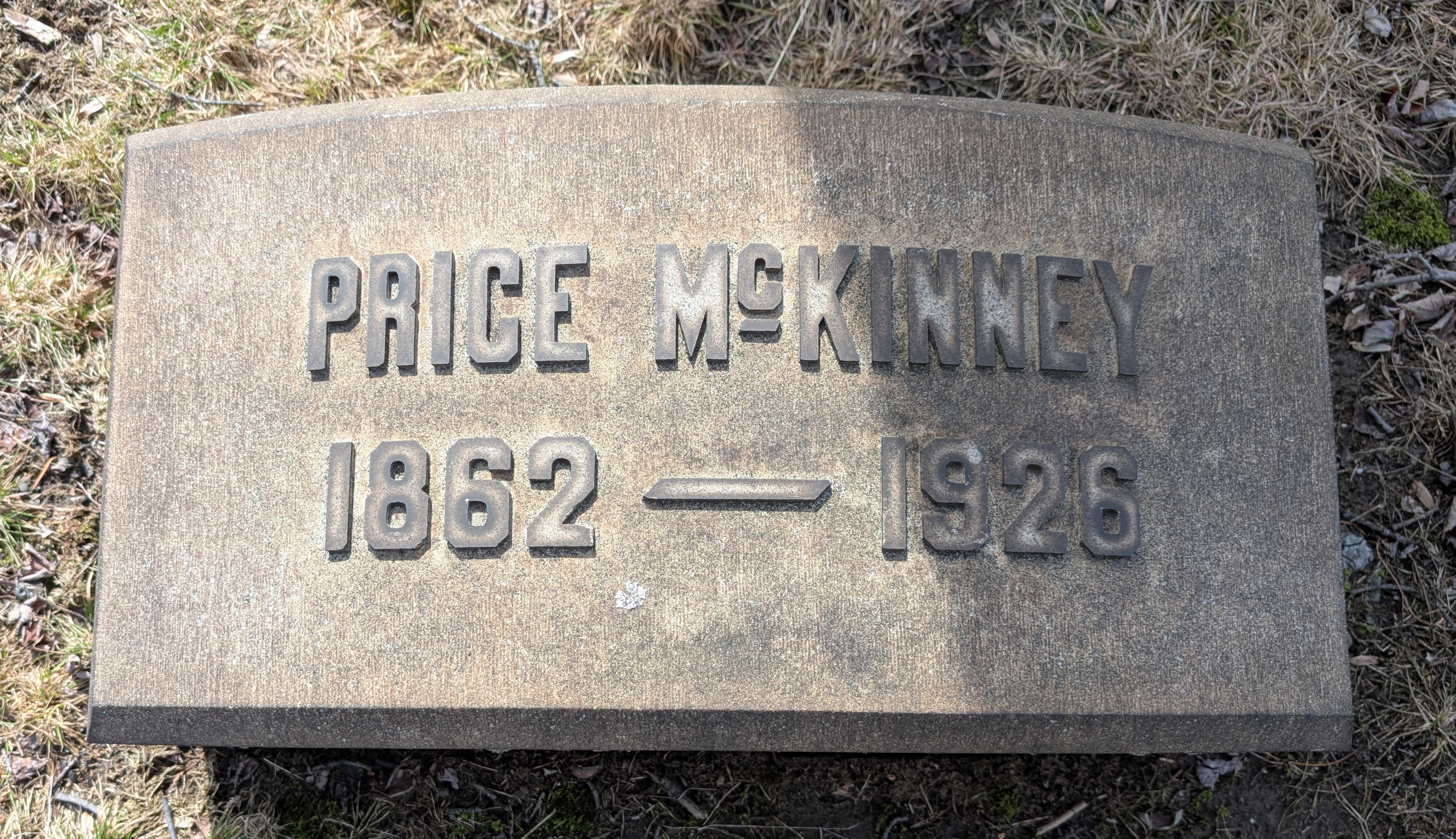
Grave of Price McKinney

By the end of 1925, Price McKinney had ceased all active participation in McKinney Steel.

On the afternoon of April 13, 1926, Price McKinney shot himself in the head in the bathroom of his home in Wickliffe, Ohio.

McKinney left an estate worth $15 million (equivalent to $212,198,000 in 2024), about a quarter less than most people believed he was worth. Most of the estate ($9 million) was locked up in shares of McKinney Steel and the Continental & Commercial National Bank of Chicago ($2.7 million). The estate was placed in a trust to benefit his widow, Lucy, and three children (Regan, age 18; Elizabeth, age 17; and Price Jr., age 11). Lucy McKinney could only draw on the income generated by 33.3% of the estate. Trustees Harry Coulby and Andrew Squire could spend the income on the remaining 66.6% of the estate on the children, or could let it accumulate. (Note: The children each inherited 22.2% of the estate up reaching the age of 25.)

Ella Burke and Parthenia Burke Ross had given McKinney power of attorney in late summer 1925 to vote their shares in McKinney Steel. His death put control of the shares back into the hands of the two women.

McKinney's suicide encouraged new rumors that McKinney Steel would merge another independent. Central Alloy Steel, (Note: It had formed out of the July 1926 merger of Central Steel and United Alloy Steel.) Mansfield Sheet & Tin Plate, and Trumbull Steel were said to be the others involved.

=== Renamed Corrigan, McKinney Steel ===
Jimmie Corrigan renamed the company Corrigan, McKinney Steel on September 23, 1926.

A mild recession occurred in the United States in 1926, and by the end of the year the company's steel plant was operating at only 50% capacity. Beginning in January 1926, the company began work on two finishing mills, which cost $5 million. The 10-inch rolling mill opened in early November 1926, while the 12-inch rolling mill opened in February 1927. The company also added a new 22.5-inch by 18-inch continuous sheet bar mill in 1926, and added two mill stands capable of handling 12-inch sheet bars to the billet mill. (Note: A mill stand is a device through which hot or cold steel is rolled in order to reduce its thickness and width. It consists of two primary rolls (heavy cylinders between which the metal passes), backup rolls (larger heavy cylinders which help reduce the deflection of the work rolls), a mechanism to adjust the gap between work rolls, a housing, and a drive train. There are a number of configurations for mill stands.) The cost of the new sheet bar mill and billet mill improvements was not made public.

In 1926, despite only working five mines, the company shipped 1,500,862 short tons (1,361,559 t) of iron ore. It had fallen to sixth place among all U.S. iron producers. (Note: U.S. Steel remained in first place, with 24,622,958 tons. Pickands Mather was second with 9,921,480 tons, M.A. Hanna was third with 3,690,523 tons, Cleveland-Cliffs Iron was fourth with 3,403,078, and Jones & Laughlin Steel fifth with 2,151,723 tons.)

The company made no public report of its earnings or profits in 1926. Privately, it paid out $1.2 million ($21,800,000 in 2025 dollars) in dividends.

McKinney Steel surrendered its lease on the Richards Mine in July 1927, and took over the much-worked Tilden Mine near Ishpeming, Michigan, in March 1928. It shipped 1,127,534 short tons (1,022,882 t) of ore in 1927.

By the end of 1927, Corrigan, McKinney Steel was the tenth largest steel manufacturer in the United States (by production), producing 1,000,000 short tons (910,000 t) of steel ingots a year. The company made no public report of its earnings or profits in 1927. Privately, it paid out another $1.2 million ($22,200,000 in 2025 dollars) in dividends.

== 1928 death of James W. Corrigan ==
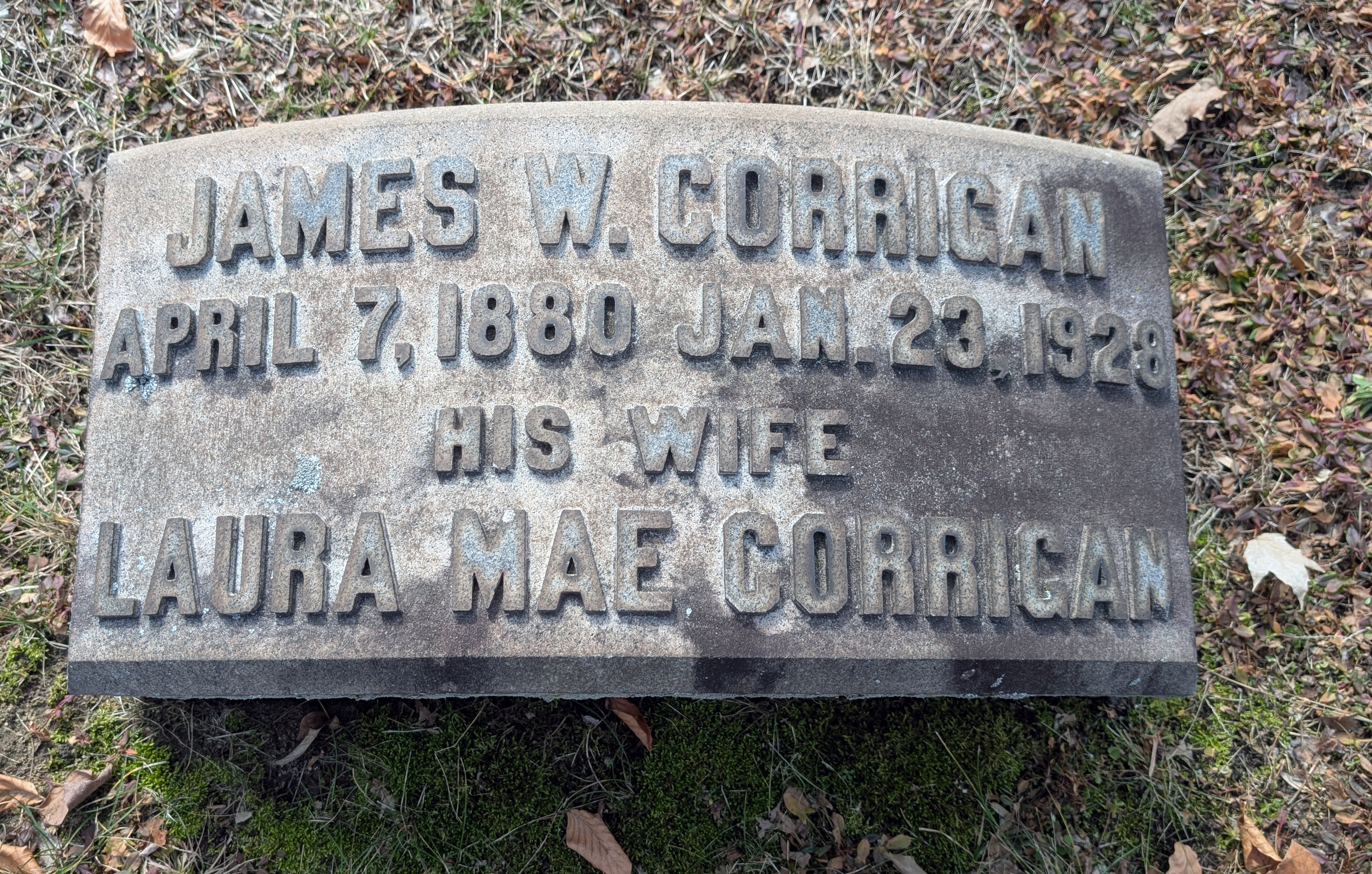
Grave of James W. Corrigan

James W. Corrigan lived only 15 months longer than Price McKinney. On January 23, 1928, he died of a heart attack while entering the Cleveland Athletic Club.

He left behind an estate valued at about $9.8 million (equivalent to $141,021,000 in 2024). Just under $8.5 million was stock in Corrigan, McKinney Steel. Corrigan's will specified that his shares in Corrigan, McKinney Steel were to be placed in a trust, with John H. Watson one trustee and the other appointed by the Union Trust Bank Co. Laura Mae Corrigan could sell her shares but not vote them. The trustees could not sell the shares without her consent, but they had full authority to vote the shares. Dividend income from the shares was paid to Mrs. Corrigan quarterly.

Corrigan's death, and the trust provisions placed on his estate, led to renewed speculation that Corrigan, McKinney Steel would merge with one or more other companies. There were even rumors that James W. Corrigan himself had been about to sell his shares in the company, but his death prevented it.

== Corrigan, McKinney Steel under John H. Watson ==
=== Status of the business at the time of Corrigan's death ===
Unknown except to executives within the company, Corrigan, McKinney Steel had accumulated $12 million (equivalent to $172,679,000 in 2024) in debt at the time of Jimmie Corrigan's death. The company already had $10 million in outstanding bank loans at the end of 1926, and incurred another $2 million in 1927. Finance & Industry, a Cleveland area business magazine, called Corrigan, McKinney's debt-to-asset ratio of 13.9% relatively low, especially when compared to other steel firms. Company insiders felt differently; John H. Watson believed Corrigan, McKinney was heavily in debt. Laura Mae Corrigan and Parthenia Burke Ross seemed to agree that the company was not in solid financial shape. (Note: Finance & Industry also observed that there were many rumors in Cleveland that Corrigan, McKinney was not doing well.)

Laura Mae Corrigan expressed her desire to sell her shares, but John H. Watson told her that he knew of no potential buyers. The Union Trust Co. said it was not interested in buying the company, either.

To improve the market for their shares, Corrigan and Ross expressed their desire to get the company into financial shape as soon as possible. Both definitely wanted to sell their shares within two years.

=== Election of John H. Watson as president ===
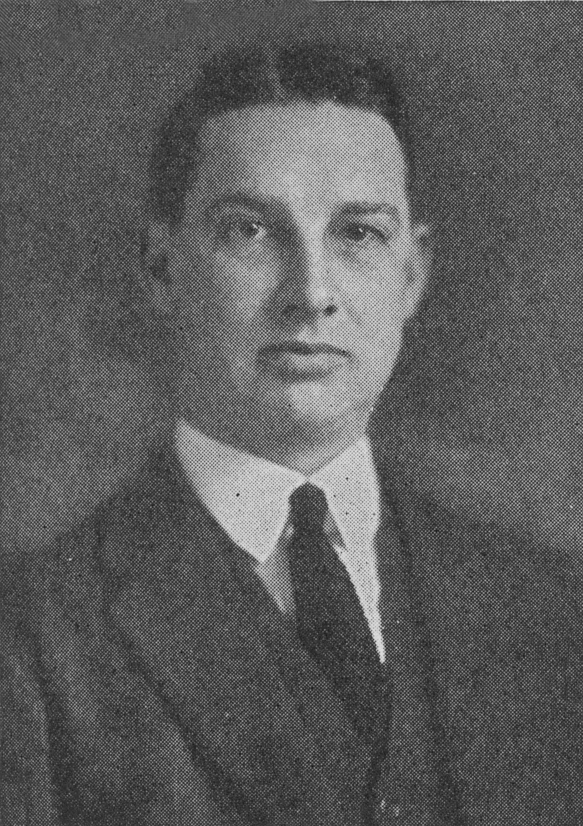
John H. Watson Jr. in 1928

Corrigan's trustees felt the best course was to elect John H. Watson president of McKinney Steel. While Watson worked to pay down debt and improve finances, Corrigan and her trustees agreed they would not entertain any sale or consolidation. Once Watson was convinced profits could no longer be reasonably improved, then Corrigan and her trustees agreed they would try to sell her shares.

Watson was unanimously elected president on January 20, 1928. Publicly, Watson said he had no intention of changing the corporate strategy laid out by James W. Corrigan in the past year. Privately, Watson made a number of changes in corporate leadership.

=== Mining and steel operations under Watson ===
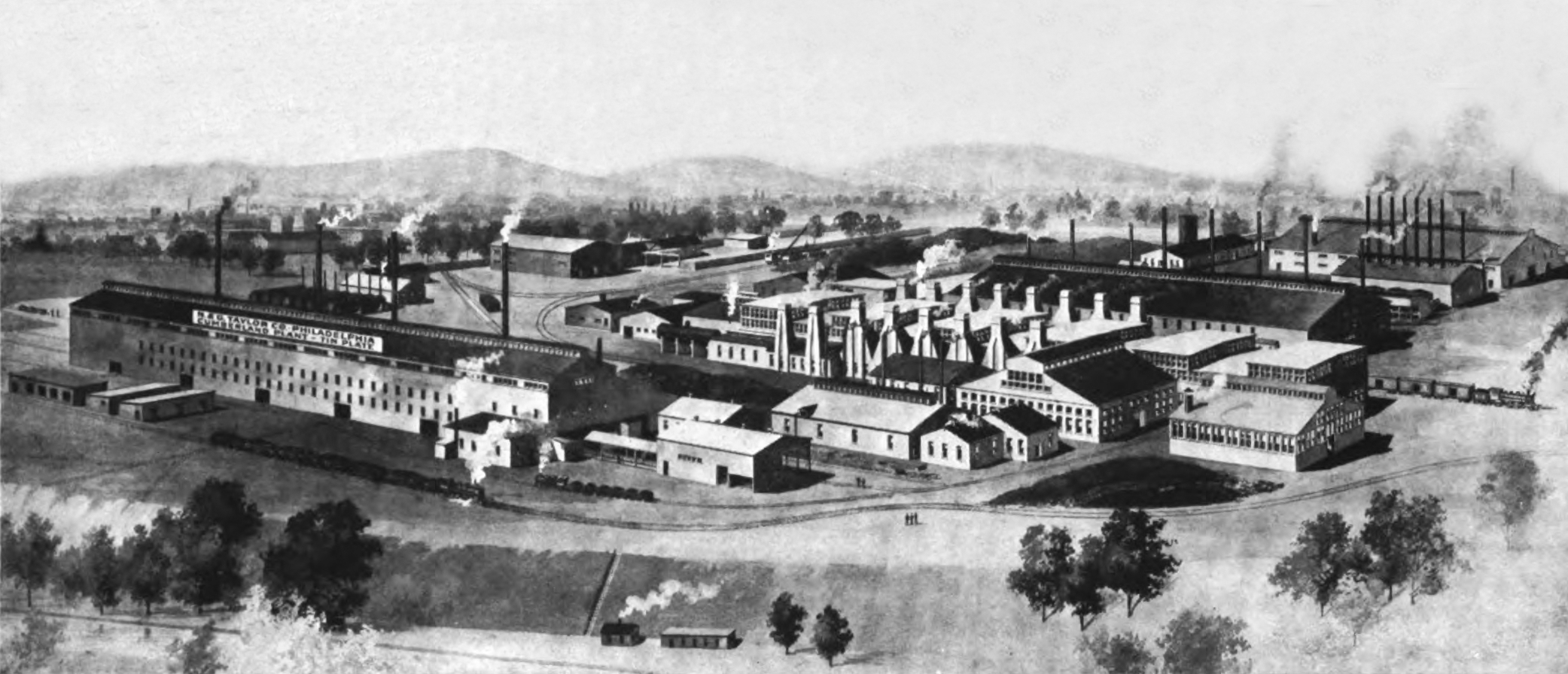
The N. & G. Taylor Co. Tin Plate Plant in Cumberland, Maryland

In Watson's first year as president, Corrigan, McKinney Steel shipped 1,281,140 short tons (1,162,230 t) of iron ore. Half the ore came from the Ironton Mine on the Gogebic range, and 38% came from the St. Paul Mine on the Mesabi range. In 1928, it shipped 1,343,699 short tons (1,218,983 t) of ore, with 40% of it coming from the Ironton.

At the start of 1928, the company's steel mill was operating only two blast furnaces, the other two undergoing repair. Ten of its 14 open-hearth furnaces were in operation. Blast furnace repairs were completed in late May, and by mid June the mill was operating at 100% capacity. Corrigan, McKinney Steel did not, however, make public its 1928 revenue or earnings, although it was later reported that it paid out $4.8 million (equivalent to $69,072,000 in 2024) in dividends ($480 per share) at the end of 1928.

Corrigan, McKinney continued to operate at 100% capacity at the start of 1929.

Merger rumors swirled all year. The general consensus was that Corrigan, McKinney Steel would be included in any merger, primarily because it was the only independent with an all-water route for shipping steel to Detroit automakers.

In late November 1929, Corrigan, McKinney purchased the N. & G. Taylor Co., which operated a tinplate plant at Cumberland, Maryland. The purchase price was not disclosed, but Corrigan, McKinney paid 45% of the price in cash and the rest in preferred stock in its new subsidiary, which retained the original company's name. To pay for the deal, Corrigan, McKinney obtained a $2 million loan, most likely from the Union Trust Co., payable on December 31, 1935. (Note: Apparently, this was later extended to December 31, 1939.)

Corrigan, McKinney once more did not reveal its earnings or dividends at the end of 1929. However, the press later reported that the company had $65 million in sales that year and again paid out $4.8 million (equivalent to $69,072,000 in 2024) in dividends ($480 per share).

One change was made in the ownership structure of Corrigan, McKinney Steel. Laura Mae Corrigan convinced her trustees to vote to increase the number of MHS preferred shares by 100. These were then turned over on February 28, 1929, to attorneys M.B. and H.H. Johnson in payment for legal fees rendered over the past several years.

== 1930 Cleveland-Cliffs purchase of Corrigan, McKinney Steel ==
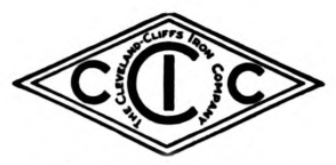
Cleveland-Cliffs Iron logo

The two-year period established by Laura Mae Corrigan and Parthenia Burke Ross for seeking a sale of Corrigan, McKinney Steel was up in February 1930. According to Laura Mae Corrigan, the individuals most responsible for the corporation's governance during the two-year period were her trustees, John H. Watson and Joseph R. Nutt. The legal firm of M.B. and H.H. Johnson had also helped to a small degree.

The timing is unclear, but a short time before March 1930, another steel company made a cash offer for all common stock of McKinney Steel Holding. The estate trustees ascertained that the buyer would move management control of the company to another city. Out of a desire to keep management local, civic pride, and other factors, Corrigan's trustees sought to find either a local buyer or a company who would keep management control in Cleveland.

Either shortly before or after March 5, Parthenia Burke Ross authorized the Union Trust Co. to represent her in the sale of her Corrigan, McKinney Steel common shares as well.

Laura Mae Corrigan returned to Cleveland from London on March 13. It was her first visit to the city since her husband's death in 1928. Although her private secretary said she had come back only to visit her husband's grave, the Cleveland Press newspaper observed that she had a full schedule of conferences with her trustees and legal advisors over the next few days.

Rumors that Corrigan, McKinney Steel would be sold swept through business circles as soon as she arrived in Cleveland, with U.S. Steel seen as the most likely bidder. The rationale was that U.S. Steel needed a steel bar plant on the lower lakes. The other potential bidder was believed to be Cyrus Eaton's Republic Steel. Mrs. Corrigan initially refused all comment, but on March 15 admitted she might sell her stake in McKinney Steel Holding.

On Monday, March 17, Nutt spoke with William G. Mather, president of Cleveland-Cliffs Iron Co., and suggested that his company purchase a controlling interest of McKinney Steel Holding common. Mather was due to depart for New York City that evening and sail to Morocco on Thursday, March 20, for an extended vacation. He delayed his departure for the coast until March 18 in order to discuss the purchase with Cleveland-Cliffs board members and executives. Mather telephoned Nutt from New York City on March 19 and said his company would buy all of Corrigan, McKinney Steel's common shares.

Cleveland-Cliffs leadership negotiating the sale were William G. Mather, S. Livingston Mather, George Garretson Wade, and Edward B. Greene.

=== Terms of the deal ===
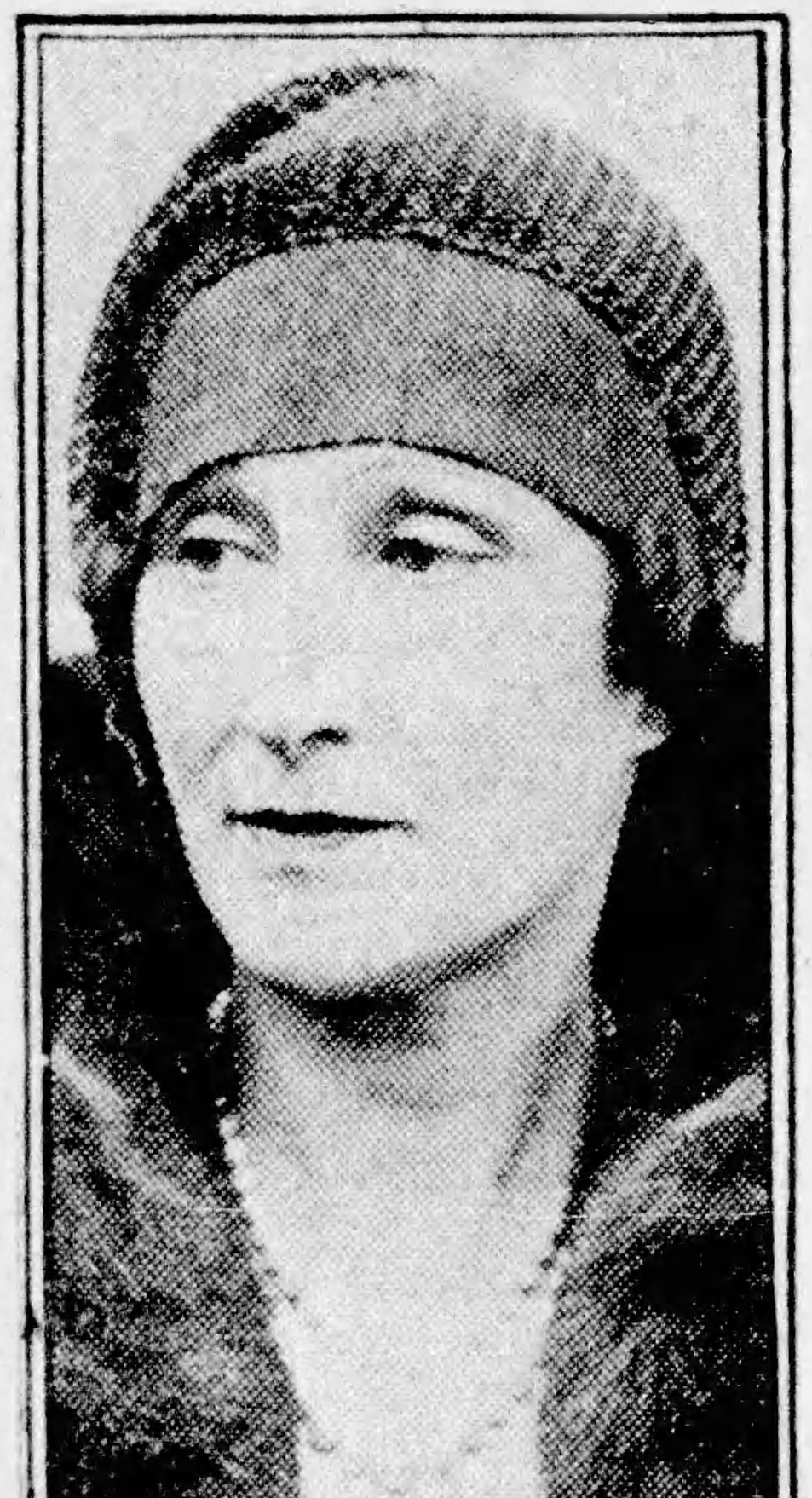
Laura Mae Corrigan

Laura Mae Corrigan and Parthenia Burke Ross agreed to the sale of their shares on March 19, 1930, and S. Livingston Mather, vice president of Cleveland-Cliffs Iron, approved his company's purchase on March 21.

The agreement required the purchaser to buy all the McKinney Steel Holding common stock owned by Laura Mae Corrigan for $24,152,500 ($465,500,000 in 2025 dollars). The purchaser also had to buy the 8.75% share of Corrigan, McKinney Steel common owned by Parthenia Burke Ross for $5,060,000 ($97,500,000 in 2025 dollars). Cleveland-Cliffs also agreed to pay $500,000 ($9,600,000 in 2025 dollars) to John H. Watson, and $50,000 ($1,000,000 in 2025 dollars) each to vice president of iron mining Donald H. Gillies, vice president of sales Henry T. Harrison, and superintendent of sales J.S. McKesson. Another $25,000 ($500,000 in 2025 dollars) to was paid to treasurer Edward G. Resch.

The purchaser also agreed to pay Laura Mae Corrigan $7,250,000 so that she could redeem the 72,500 shares of McKinney Steel Holding preferred at the call price of $105 per share. (Note: Mrs. Corrigan paid $7,612,500 for all 72,500 shares, contributing $362,500 of her own money to the purchase.)

The deal was made public on Friday, March 21. At a special meeting of the board of directors of Corrigan, McKinney Steel that day, four of the six directors resigned and Edward B. Greene (a director of Cleveland-Cliffs, and a director and member of the board of the Union Trust Co.), J.E. Ferris, Henry A. Raymond (director of ore sales for Cleveland-Cliffs), and Andrew Squire (chief legal counsel for Cleveland-Cliffs) were elected in their place. All the officers of Corrigan, McKinney Steel resigned as well, although Henry T. Harrison, Donald Gilles, and J.S. McKesson were reelected as vice presidents. New officers included William G. Mather, president; S. Livingston Mather, vice president; and David T. Croxton, secretary. (Note: Croxton would be added to the board of directors in June 1930.) Edward G. Resch was reelected as treasurer, and added the title of assistant secretary to his duties. (Note: The resignations were part of the purchase agreement: Laura Mae Corrigan's trustees were required to secure the resignation of all board members, officers, and directors.)

It was not widely known as the time that the sale price included bonuses for several people. According to Laura Mae Corrigan, her husband had promised to pay Parthenia Burke Ross a bonus for agreeing to sell her shares. He had also promised to pay a bonus to Laura Mae's trustees when her stock was sold. After James W. Corrigan's death, Laura Mae said she reaffirmed these promises. Immediately after the sale was announced, the Union Trust Co. paid $489,198 to the trustees and $190,000 to Parthenia Burke Ross. (Note: No explanation was offered as to why the bank, rather than the estate, paid these bonuses.)

=== Outcome of the merger ===
Cleveland-Cliffs purchased 62.5% of Corrigan, McKinney Steel common stock. The acquisition seemed to make sense: Corrigan, McKinney was a ready customer for Cleveland-Cliffs ore, and the steel firm owned several iron mines in Michigan. It also ensured that iron ore mined by Corrigan, McKinney Steel and steel manufactured by Corrigan, McKinney Steel would travel on the 23 ships owned by Cleveland-Cliffs.

The purchase of Corrigan, McKinney Steel by Cleveland-Cliffs was a major coup for industrialist Cyrus Eaton, the moving force in steel industry consolidations in the 1920s. He purchased Trumbull Steel Co. in 1925; United Alloy Steel, the Central Steel Co., and the United Furnace Co. in 1926; Republic Iron and Steel and Sheet & Tubes, Inc. in 1928; Interstate Iron & Steel, Donner Steel and Witherow Steel in 1929; and Union Drawn Steel in 1930. He also owned a substantial interest in Youngstown Sheet & Tube, which he had obtained in 1927 and which he probably intended to fold it into Republic Iron and Steel at some future time.

On May 1, 1929, Cleveland-Cliffs Iron Co. had created the Cliffs Corporation, a holding company. To capitalize it, Cleveland-Cliffs invested all 400,000 shares of its common stock, which was valued at approximately $90 million (equivalent to $1,290,651,000 in 2024). (Note: Cleveland-Cliffs had 400,000 shares of common stock, all of which had voting rights. It created 500,000 shares of non-voting preferred stock, and gave each shareholder 1.25 shares of preferred for each 1 share of common they held. It sweetened the deal by paying a special $5 dividend to each share of common stock. All of Cleveland-Cliffs common stock was then invested in Cliffs Corp.) Eaton invested all the stock he held in Inland Steel, Republic Iron & Steel, Wheeling Steel, and Youngstown Sheet & Tube, which was valued at $40 million (equivalent to $573,623,000 in 2024). The two investors split the 800,000 common shares of Cliffs Corporation equally.

As Cliffs Corp. owned Cleveland-Cliffs Iron, Eaton effectively had a 50 percent interest in both Cleveland-Cliffs Iron and Corrigan, McKinney Steel. This effectively prevented Bethlehem Steel and U.S. Steel from obtaining a foothold in Cleveland, which could sell steel more cheaply to Detroit automakers due to its all-water, no transshipment shipping route. Although Eaton had a substantial portion of Youngstown Sheet & Tube stock, he did not yet have a controlling interest. The Corrigan, McKinney deal discouraged Youngstown Sheet & Tube from merging with another company (most notably Eaton's biggest competitor, Bethlehem Steel).

== Financial stress on Cleveland-Cliffs ==
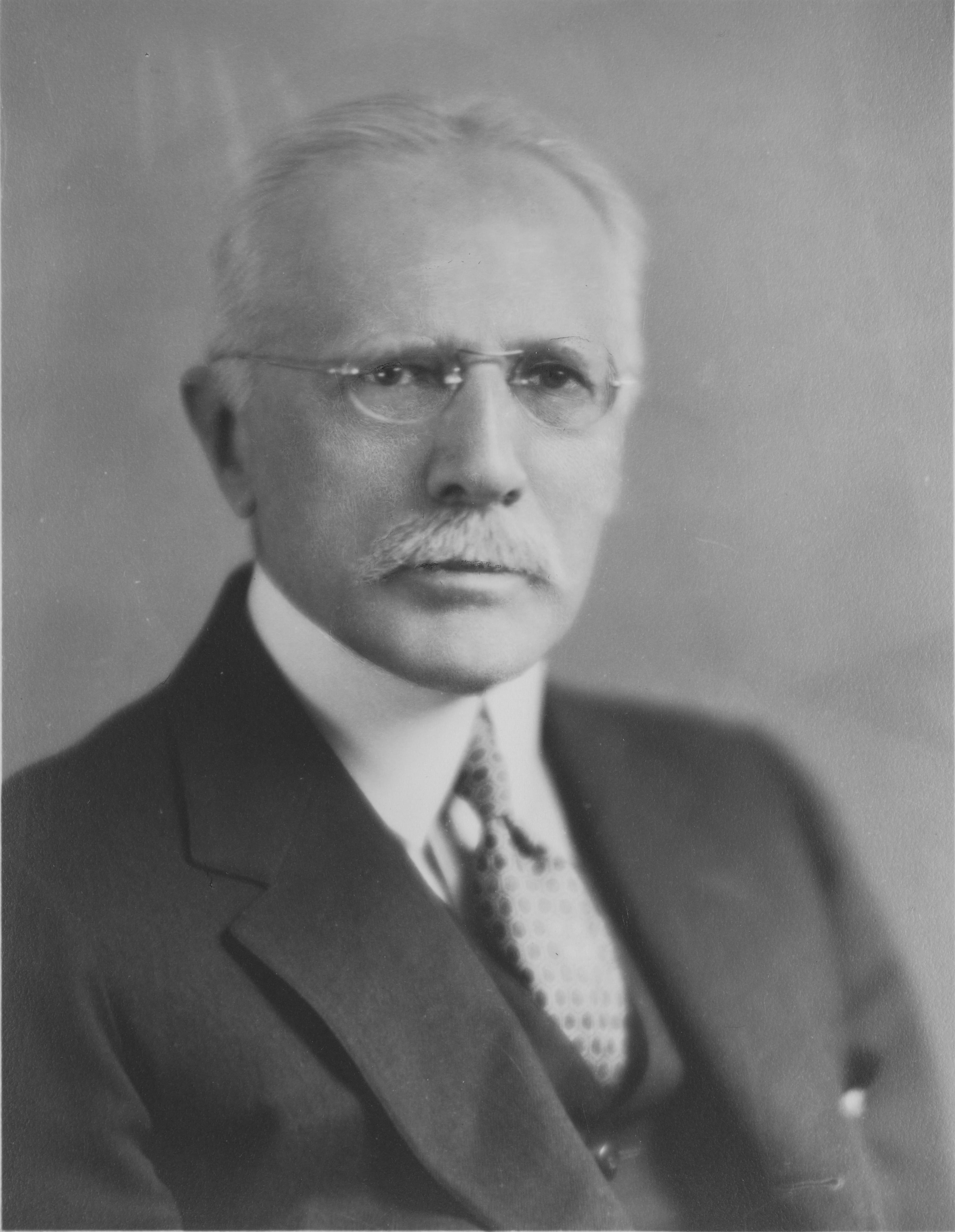
William G. Mather in 1930

=== Financing the merger with Cleveland-Cliffs ===
To finance the deal, Cleveland-Cliffs paid $5 million ($96,400,000 in 2025 dollars) in cash and borrowed $25 million ($385,500,000 in 2025 dollars) from eight banks and individuals. Banks providing financing were: Bankers Trust ($4 million), Continental Illinois Bank & Trust ($3.5 million), the Union Trust Co. ($3,387,500), the Guardian Trust Co. of Cleveland ($1.5 million), First National Bank of Chicago ($1 million), Central United National Bank of Cleveland ($500,000), and the Cleveland Trust Co. ($300,000). William G. Mather personally loaned Cleveland-Cliffs another $200,000 to complete the deal.

=== Inability to dispose of Corrigan, McKinney assets ===
Cleveland-Cliffs did not intend to get into the steel business, but rather intended to sell the blast furnaces and steel mill to Eaton.

Although the Great Depression had begun in late October 1929, Greene and other Cleveland-Cliffs directors and officers believed the economy had only entered a short-term recession. They were disabused of that idea by early 1931. As early as January 1931, and continuing for several months thereafter, Cleveland-Cliffs was rumored to be trying to sell Corrigan, McKinney to Republic Steel. (Note: William G. Mather went out of his way to deny rumors of a merger.) The company tried in 1931 to pay off the high-interest, short-term loans used to finance the Corrigan, McKinney Steel purchase by selling long-term, low-interest bonds, but found no buyers.

Corrigan, McKinney Steel paid out $4.8 million (equivalent to $69,072,000 in 2024) in dividends ($480 per share) at the end of fiscal 1930. Its earnings/losses for the fiscal year ending April 30, 1931, were not reported, but the firm was widely believed to be operating at a loss.

=== Corrigan, McKinney's financial problems ===
Corrigan, McKinney stopped paying dividends on its preferred stock in 1931, and Cleveland-Cliffs—on its way to breaking even in 1931—took out a loan to pay them. The dividend situation so alarmed the Union Trust Co., however, that in January 1932 it asked J.P. Morgan & Co. if it would buy its Corrigan, McKinney stock for $3.4 million. J.P. Morgan declined to do so.

Corrigan, McKinney lost nearly $1.9 million ($44,800,000 in 2025 dollars) in the fiscal year ending April 30, 1932. Cleveland-Cliffs stopped paying dividends on Corrigan, McKinney's preferred stock in March 1932.

=== Cleveland-Cliffs's financial problems ===
Cleveland-Cliffs was able to refinance its short-term notes with one-year notes in 1932. The first of these was a loan of $3.5 million ($318,600,000 in 2025 dollars), which it received on March 29, 1932, from Union Trust Co. These funds were used to pay off debt to other banks.

The $3.4 million Cleveland-Cliffs had borrowed from Union Trust in 1930 came due on July 1, 1932. The loan was renewed by Union Trust on June 23, 1932, but only for three months. Union Trust renewed it again on September 23, 1932. Although it routinely paid interest on its loans, Cleveland-Cliffs paid down none of the principal.

By December 1932, Cleveland-Cliffs had lost $2.5 million. It was in such financial extremity that Cyrus Eaton organized a group of banks to loan roughly $575,000 ($13,600,000 in 2025 dollars) to the company to keep it afloat. Cleveland-Cliffs had to put up all of its own stock as well as that of all of its subsidiaries as collateral for the loan. Mather personally loaned $1.5 million ($35,400,000 in 2025 dollars) to the company as well. He obtained these funds from banks by mortgaging all his personal tangible assets.

Corrigan, McKinney lost nearly $1.5 million ($37,300,000 in 2025 dollars) before EBIDTA in the fiscal year ending April 30, 1933.

== Corrigan, McKinney's 1932 purchase of Newton Steel ==
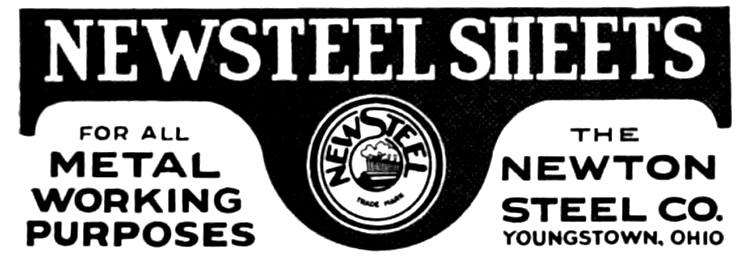
Newton Steel made finished steel sheets for the automotive industry.

Newton Steel was a maker of finished steel based in Newton, Ohio, which finalized completion on a new finished steel mill plant near Monroe, Michigan, in February 1930. It built the Monroe plant using a $3 million bond issue, which came due on January 1, 1932. Newton Steel did not manufacture basic steel, as Corrigan, McKinney did. Corrigan, McKinney supplied nearly all the steel bars used by Newton Steel, and Newton Steel was Corrigan, McKinney's most important client. With the depression, Corrigan, McKinney very much needed to secure a reliable customer for its semi-finished steel, and Newton Steel seemed to provide that since it supplied finished steel sheets to automobile manufacturers.

Merger talks between Corrigan, McKinney and Newton Steel began in January 1930, but broke off at the end of the year.

Newton Steel proposed to redeem the 1929 bonds by swapping them for $3 million in 7% bonds due on January 1, 1935. (Note: The actual amount of 7% bonds sold was $4 million, but $1 million was used in paying interest on the 1930 bond issue.)

The Union Trust Co. of Cleveland (through its subsidiary, Union Cleveland Corp.) and the Midland Bank of Cleveland (through its subsidiary, Midland Corp.) agreed to underwrite the bond sale. It was an abuse for personal gain: The Union Trust Co. held a majority of the preferred shares in McKinney Steel Holding and effectively controlled it. When some Newton Steel bondholders balked at the swap, Corrigan, McKinney agreed to purchase $129,000 worth of 6% bonds from investors who had refused to exchange them. It guaranteed payment on $25,000 worth of 7% bonds in order to get another bondholder to agree to the swap.

Merger negotiations resumed in May 1932.

The two sides reached agreement on June 30, 1932, It was financed by issuing new shares of Corrigan, McKinney stock: Shareholders of Corrigan, McKinney Steel received 1,015,000 voting and 235,000 nonvoting shares in exchange for their existing common stock. Holders of the 25,850 shares of Newton Steel preferred received 25,850 voting shares of Corrigan, McKinney common stock. Holders of the 264,000 common shares of Newton Steel received 105,000 voting shares and 52,250 non-voting shares of Corrigan, McKinney common stock. Corrigan, McKinney retained 66,300 unissued non-voting common shares.

Newton Steel's shareholders approved the deal on August 16, 1932, and Corrigan, McKinney Steel's shareholders approved the issuance of 1,500,000 shares of common stock on August 29.

== Republic Steel purchase of Corrigan, McKinney Steel ==
=== Cleveland-Cliffs loses control of Corrigan, McKinney ===
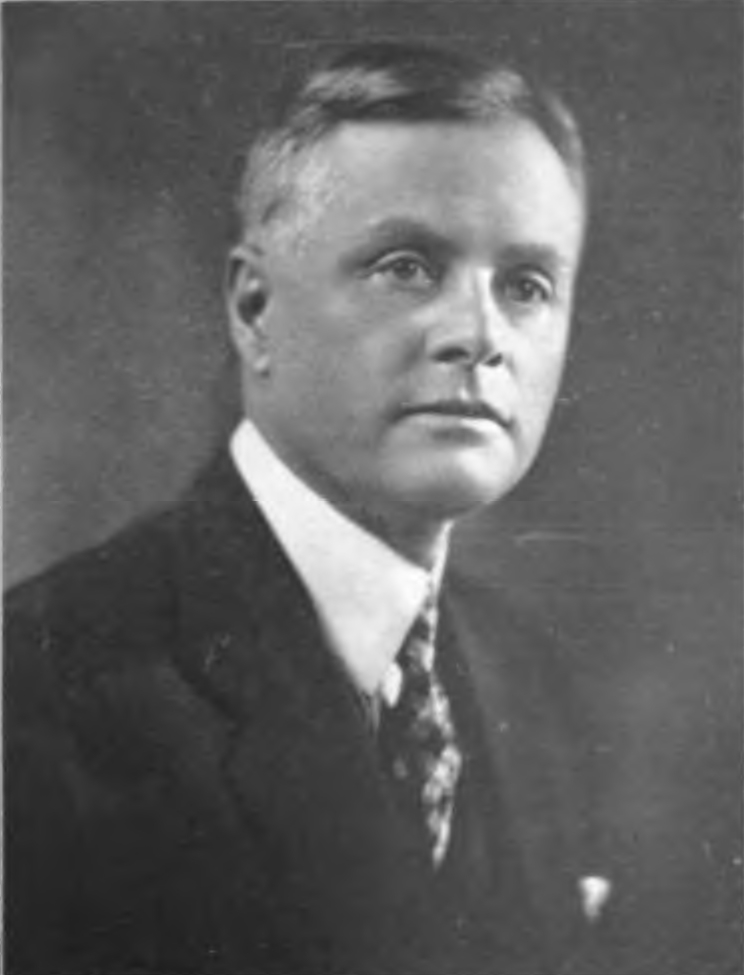
Oscar L. Cox in 1928

By the end of January 1933, dividends on McKinney Steel Holding preferred stock had not been paid for more than six months. On February 16, 1933, this triggered the voting provisions in the articles of incorporation that transferred voting rights from McKinney Steel Holding common to preferred stock.

Cleveland-Cliffs owned only 88 of the 72,500 shares of McKinney Steel Holding preferred. Trusts, banks, a few businesses, and more than 1,000 members of the public owned the remaining shares. The largest block of preferred stock was held by the Union Trust Co. It had 23,324 shares (worth $2,417,000 on February 27, 1933 [equivalent to $41,677,000 in 2024]), or about a third of the total.

The Union Trust Co. became insolvent on February 27, 1933, (Note: According to E.J. Falkenstein, a banking investigator for the Ohio state legislature, the Union Trust Co., according to its own internal accounting, was insolvent as of October 31, 1932. It had written off written off 15 loans totaling $16.6 million (equivalent to $309,965,000 in 2024), written off half of a loan worth $12.2 million (equivalent to $227,806,000 in 2024), and written off half a loan worth $15 million (equivalent to $280,089,000 in 2024) after the stocks used as collateral had lost most of their value. The combined losses of $37 million (equivalent to $690,887,000 in 2024) was far more the bank's capital of $22.85 million (equivalent to $426,669,000 in 2024), even including the $14.5 million (equivalent to $270,753,000 in 2024) the bank claimed to have in surplus. Yet, the bank stayed open. It even paid dividends of $228,500 (equivalent to $4,267,000 in 2024) on January 1, 1933, using capital to pay the dividends.) Veteran California banker Oscar L. Cox was named conservator of the Union Trust Co. on April 6.

=== Union Trust's conservator makes changes ===
Through its preferred shares, the Union Trust Co. effectively controlled McKinney Steel Holding. Cox ousted the three McKinney Steel Holding board members supported by Cleveland-Cliffs and installed three of his own. Greene and Mather were the only two board members re-elected.

In August 1933, having lost the confidence of the company's lenders, 75-year-old William G. Mather resigned as president of Cleveland-Cliffs. Edward B. Greene was appointed the new president by the board of MSH, overseeing day-to-day operations of the company. At his first meeting with Cliffs's board of directors, Greene said some assets might have to be sold in order for the company to stay solvent.

Corrigan, McKinney Steel again paid no dividends for the fiscal year ending April 1, 1934.

=== Cox pushes sale of Corrigan, McKinney Steel ===
Union Trust Co. conservator Oscar L. Cox pressed Cleveland-Cliffs to sell Corrigan, McKinney Steel. The bank had loaned large amounts of money to both Corrigan, McKinney (Note: Union Trust still had $10 million in loans to Corrigan, McKinney Steel on the books in 1934.) and to Cleveland-Cliffs, and Cox believed the only way the bank could be repaid is if Corrigan, McKinney were sold to a profitable new owner. To Cox, Republic Steel seemed the best suitor. Cox was aided by shareholders of McKinney Steel Holding preferred, who very much wanted a sale.

In February 1933, Cleveland-Cliffs entered into exploratory negotiations to sell Corrigan, McKinney Steel to Republic Steel. General Motors held tentative negotiations with Cleveland-Cliffs in February 1934, seeking to obtain a controlling interest in Corrigan, McKinney Steel, but no definite offer was made.

There were media reports in May 1933 that Cleveland-Cliffs had entered into negotiations with an unnamed party to sell Corrigan, McKinney, but these did not bear fruit.

The discussions with Republic Steel became more concrete in June 1933. Cleveland-Cliffs wished to sell the steel mill and Corrigan, McKinney's mines as a package. Edward B. Greene and William G. Mather worked with Tom Girdler of Republic Steel, with negotiations assisted by Crispin Oglebay. (Oglebay was head of Oglebay Norton, an ore mining and shipping company. He was also a director of both Corrigan, McKinney Steel and Republic Steel.)

Negotiations between the two continued throughout 1933 and into 1934.

=== Republic Steel negotiations ===
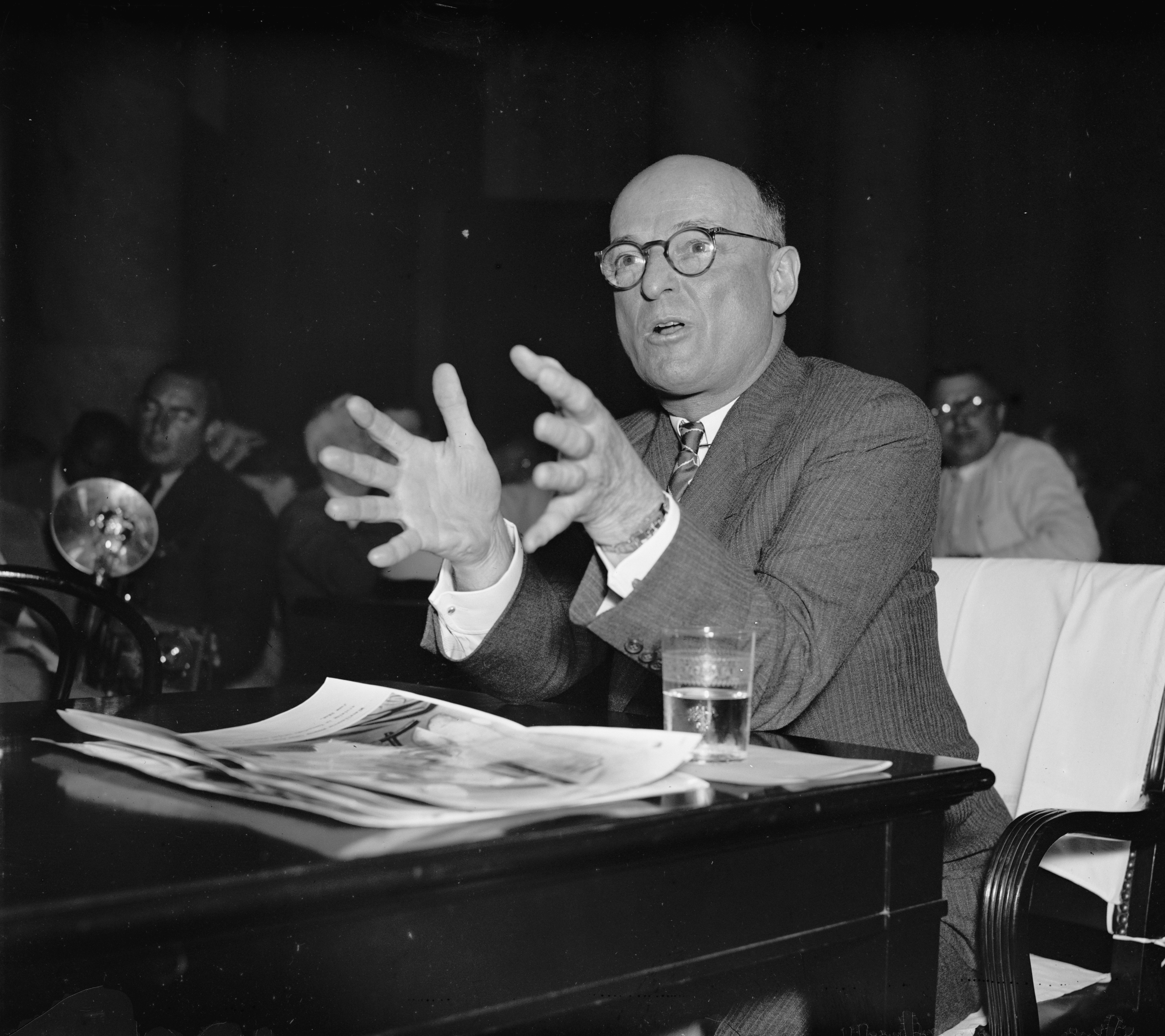
Tom Girdler, head of Republic Steel

Formal confirmation that negotiations were occurring came on July 6, 1934, as the talks were nearing a conclusion. The complex ownership structure of Corrigan, McKinney Steel took some time to resolve. The talks reached a critical point on July 9, when an all-day meeting was held with representatives of the investment banks Kuhn, Loeb & Co. and Field, Glore & Co. Also present were Oscar L. Cox, George B. Young of Andrews & Belden (chief counsel for Cleveland-Cliffs), and Myron Wick, a key vice president of Republic Steel.

On July 17, Corrigan, McKinney Steel reported that it had a net profit of $729,050 (equivalent to $13,335,000 in 2024) before EBIDTA for the fiscal year ending April 30, 1934. Its liabilities, however, were $3,644,100 (equivalent to $48,365,000 in 2024).

Frequent conferences were held between the two parties in July and August. Legal experts for both sides gathered on August 17, an indication that the merger was getting much closer. On August 21, the news media reported that Truscon Steel had joined the talks.

On August 3, William G. Mather and Edward B. Greene resigned as directors of McKinney Steel Holding. Mather was replaced as president by Oscar L. Cox. The move was made in order to ensure that the interests of the preferred shareholders became the primary consideration of the holding company's directors.

=== Agreement to merge ===
The two sides announced their agreement to merge on August 27, 1934. In terms of assets, it was the largest steel merger in the U.S. since the formation of Republic Steel in 1930. Under the terms of the deal, Corrigan, McKinney Steel would be absorbed by Republic Steel and cease to exist. To pay for Corrigan, McKinney Steel, McKinney Steel Holding received Republic Steel 5.5% bonds worth $6.396 million, 13,437 shares of Republic Steel 6% preferred stock, and 335,937 share of Republic Steel common stock.

The merger required the approval of the shareholders of Corrigan, McKinney Steel, McKinney Steel Holding, and Republic Steel. The court overseeing the liquidation of Continental Shares ordered on September 15 that the Republic Steel and Cliffs Corp. shares it controlled to be voted in favor of the merger. On September 28, the board of directors of both McKinney Steel Holding and Corrigan, McKinney Steel recommended that their shareholders approve the merger. The board of Cleveland-Cliffs Iron recommended the merger to their shareholders on October 2.

The first stockholders group to act were those of Cleveland-Cliffs, who approved the merger on October 22. The preferred shareholders of McKinney Steel Holding, perhaps the linchpin to the merger, approved the deal 78.7% to 21.3% on October 24, with 57,566 shared voting out of a total of 72,500. Republic Steel shareholders were due to meet October 25, but their meeting was postponed until December. The merger seemed secure, as Republic Steel head Tom Girdler said on November 15 that at least 50% of all classes of Republic Steel shares had voted in favor of it.

The Republic Steel shareholders meeting was postponed again, ostensibly to await the U.S. Supreme Court's ruling in the Gold Clause Cases. (Note: The Gold Reserve Act of 1934 had authorized the president of the United States to establish the gold value of the dollar by proclamation. Since the value of bonds and contracts were almost always convertible into gold, this had the effect of devaluing the U.S. dollar. This generated a number of lawsuits. The Republic Steel-Corrigan, McKinney Steel merger also contained "gold clauses", and would have to be renegotiated and rewritten if the lawsuits were allowed to proceed.) On February 6, 1935, the U.S. Department of Justice filed an antitrust lawsuit to block the merger. A federal district court ruled in Republic Steel's favor on May 2. (Note: By then, Corrigan, McKinney Steel owed $1.305 million to its preferred shareholders.) The Republic Steel shareholders meeting was repeatedly postponed as the two companies awaited the August 13 deadline for the federal government to appeal.

When the Justice Department finally said it would not appeal the ruling, Republic Steel finally scheduled its shareholder meeting. Its shareholders approved the merger 72.4% to 27.6% on September 23. The same day, the Corrigan, McKinney Steel shareholders also approved the merger.

The two companies merged on September 25, 1935, and Corrigan, McKinney Steel was legally dissolved a few days later.

The sale of Corrigan, McKinney Steel left Cleveland-Cliffs with all of the debt it had incurred in the 1930 purchase, and none of the assets.

== Dissolution of McKinney Steel Holding ==
With the sale of Corrigan, McKinney to Republic Steel, McKinney Steel Holding no longer had any purpose. The first step in winding up the company would be to redeem all outstanding preferred shares. (Note: Some preferred shareholders had exercised their option under the merger deal to exchange their shares for Republic Steel bonds. This reduced the number of outstanding McKinney Steel Holding preferred shares to 63,556.) This would also help Cox liquidate the Union Trust by converting the shares it owned into cash. Dissolution of McKinney Steel Holding would also allow Cleveland-Cliffs to take ownership of the 335,937 shares of Republic Steel common stock McKinney Steel Holding held.

In October 1935, preferred shareholders approved a plan that allowed McKinney Steel Holding to redeem up to 10,000 preferred shares a year by liquidating the Republic Steel securities it held. The number of shares redeemed depended on obtaining a good price for the Republic Steel bonds the holding company held. At a minimum, Cox estimated, it would take three to seven-and-a-half years to redeem all the preferred stock.

However, on October 23, the Union Trust Co. received an offer from an eastern banking syndicate made up of Kuhn, Loeb & Co.; Field, Glore & Co.; Hayden, Stone & Co.; Lehman Brothers; and Bankers Trust Co. of New York for its Republic Steel bonds that would allow it to redeem MSH preferred at $127.50 per share. (That was the call price of $105 per preferred share, plus all dividends owed.) This would permit McKinney Steel Holding to retire all outstanding shares of preferred stock by December 31, 1935.

Selling all its bond assets immediately and shortening the time for redemption of preferred shares (Note: The directors of McKinney Steel Holding wanted to call all preferred stock on December 2, 1935, or within 10 days, whichever came first.) required stockholder approval. Cox called a special stockholders meeting for November 14. Subsequently, 100% of McKinney Steel Holding preferred stockholders and 100% of common shares approved Cox's plan.

When the money from the banking syndicate came through in days, not weeks as anticipated, redemption of McKinney Steel Holding preferred was moved up to November 19. MSH preferred shareholders were paid $8,103,390 (equivalent to $145,467,000 in 2024), of which roughly $3 million (equivalent to $53,854,000 in 2024) went to the Union Trust Co.

The day the MSH preferred stock was redeemed, Greene announced that McKinney Steel Holding would be dissolved. (Note: The day the McKinney Steel Holding preferred stock was retired, Greene won approval from the Cleveland-Cliffs board of directors to sell $16.5 million in bonds and sign a $5 million deed of trust note to refinance the debt incurred by the purchase of Corrigan, McKinney Steel. The company anticipated $500,000 a year in interest savings.) At the McKinney Steel Holding board meeting on December 7, 1935, the entire board of directors resigned, including Oscar L. Cox, the president. Edward B. Greene and four other Cleveland-Cliffs officers were elected in this place, and Greene named president. The title to all common shares of McKinney Steel Holding was transferred to Cleveland-Cliffs, as well as the $1.6 million in cash still held by McKinney Steel Holding. McKinney Steel Holding was then dissolved.

== Bibliography ==
- American Iron and Steel Association (1890). Directory of Iron and Steel Works of the United States and Canada. Philadelphia: Allen, Lane & Scott. OCLC 2092992.
- Bing, Alexander M. (June 1919). "The Work of the Wage-Adjustment Boards". Journal of Political Economy. 27 (6): 421–456. doi:10.1086/253193. JSTOR 1821930.
- Brody, David (1960). Steelworkers in America: The Nonunion Era. Cambridge, Mass.: Harvard University Press. OCLC 499743224.
- Coben, Stanley (1963). A. Mitchell Palmer: Politician. New York: Columbia University Press. OCLC 767391.
- Committee on Banking and Currency (1934). Hearings before the Committee on Banking and Currency on S.Res. 84 and S.Res 56 and S.Res 97. Part 18: Reports on Cleveland Banking Investigation, May 3 and 4, 1934. U.S. Senate. 73d Cong., 2d sess (PDF). Washington, D.C.: Government Printing Office.
- Committee on Banking and Currency (1934). Hearings before the Committee on Banking and Currency on S.Res. 84 and S.Res 56 and S.Res 97. Part 20: Reports on Cleveland Banking Investigation, May 3 and 4, 1934. U.S. Senate. 73d Cong., 2d sess. Washington, D.C.: Government Printing Office.
- Crowell, Benedict; Murray, C.B. (1927). The Iron Ores of Lake Superior: Containing Some Facts of Interest Relating to Mining, Beneficiation and Shipping of the Ore and Location of Principal Mines. Cleveland: The Penton Press Company. OCLC 2831538.
- Dubofsky, Melvyn; Dulles, Foster Rhea (1999). Labor in America: A History. Wheeling, Ill.: Harlan Davidson. ISBN 9780882959795.
- Gleisser, Marcus (2005). The World of Cyrus Eaton. Kent, Ohio: Kent State University Press. ISBN 9780873388399.
- Gregg, Richard B. (November 1919). "The National War Labor Board". Harvard Law Review. 33: 39–63. doi:10.2307/1328084. JSTOR 1328084.
- James, H.L.; Dutton, C.E.; Pettijohn, F.J.; Wier, K.L. (1968). Geology and Ore Deposits of the Iron River-Crystal Falls District, Iron County, Michigan. Geological Survey Professional Paper 570. Washington, D.C.: U.S. Government Printing Office. OCLC 78141.
- Jensen, John Odin (2019). Stories From the Wreckage: A Great Lakes Maritime History Inspired By Shipwrecks. Madison, Wisc.: Wisconsin Historical Society Press. ISBN 9780870209024.
- Kennedy, James Harrison (1897). A History of the City of Cleveland: Biographical Volume. Cleveland: Imperial Press. OCLC 3577276.
- Kindleberger, Charles P. (1973). The World in Depression, 1929–39. Berkeley, Calif.: University of California Press. ISBN 9780520055926.
- Moody's Manual of Investments: American and Foreign. New York: Moody's Investors Service. 1929. OCLC 1770889.
- Newett, George A. (1899). Mines and Mineral Statistics. Michigan Department of Mineral Statistics. Ishpeming, Mich.: Presses of Iron Ore Printing House. OCLC 13273219.
- Quin, Richard H. (1993). Indiana County, Pennsylvania: An Inventory of Historic Engineering and Industrial Sites (PDF). Washington, D.C.: Historic American Buildings Survey/Historic American Engineering Record. OCLC 27432667.
- Rayback, Joseph G. (1966). A History of American Labor. New York: Free Press. ISBN 9780029258507.
- Reutter, Mark (2004). Making Steel: Sparrows Point and the Rise and Ruin of American Industrial Might. Urbana, Ill.: University of Illinois Press. ISBN 9780252072338.
- Reynolds, Terry S.; Dawson, Virginia P. (2011). Iron Will: Cleveland-Cliffs and the Mining of Iron Ore, 1847-2006. Detroit: Wayne State University Press. ISBN 9780814336434.
- Subcommittee of the Committee on Education and Labor (1939). Violations of Free Speech and Rights of Labor. Part 33: "Little Steel". Committee on Education and Labor. U.S. Senate. 75th Cong., 3d sess. Washington, D.C.: Government Printing Office. hdl:2027/uc1.$b643163.
- Weir, Robert E.; Hanlan, James P. (2004). Historical Encyclopedia of American Labor. Volume 2: P-Z. Westport, Conn.: Greenwood Press. ISBN 9780313318405.
