= Deer Lake (Michigan) =

Lake in Marquette County, Michigan, United States

- Location within Michigan
- Location: Ishpeming Township, Marquette County, Michigan
- Coordinates: 46°31′43″N 87°41′10″W
- Type: Lake
- Basin countries: United States
- Max. length: 1 mi (1.6 km)
- Max. width: 1.5 mi (2.4 km)
- Surface elevation: 1,380 ft (420 m)

Deer Lake is a lake in the U.S. state of Michigan, located north of the city of Ishpeming. In the 1980s, the lake was identified by the U.S. and Canadian governments as one of 43 Areas of Concern (AOC) in the Great Lakes region. High levels of mercury had been detected in the lake and efforts have been made to reduce the amount of mercury going into the lake. As a result of contamination, Deer Lake was designated as a catch and release site, as fish caught in the lake were unsafe for consumption. In late 2014, the lake was delisted as an AOC, one of the first two lakes to be delisted in the state and one of only three AOCs to achieve the status. According to the EPA, the restrictions on fishing were removed as well.

== See also ==
- List of lakes in Michigan
