= Trumbull Steel-Republic Iron and Steel merger of 1927 =

The merger of Trumbull Steel and Republic Iron & Steel in 1927 was the merger of the sixth-largest and nineteenth-largest steel manufacturers in the United States. Republic Iron & Steel, founded in 1899, had been in financial difficulty off and on between 1923 and 1927. The smaller Trumbull Steel went through a significant financial crisis in 1925. Both firms were targeted for consolidation by Cyrus S. Eaton, an industrial investor from Cleveland, Ohio. To prepare for the merger, Eaton also won control of and merged the Ohio-based steel firms Central Steel and United Alloy Steel.

The Trumbull Steel-Republic Iron & Steel merger created the fifth-largest steel firm in the United States, and set the stage for a much larger merger of several steel firms into Republic Steel in 1929.

== Merger background ==
The American steel industry had been undergoing consolidation since the creation of U.S. Steel in 1901. Most of this activity involved very small companies merging into larger ones. By 1920, the largest steel-making company in the United States (by annual tonnage) was U.S. Steel, followed by Bethlehem Steel, Republic Iron & Steel, Midvale Steel, Lackawanna Steel, Jones & Laughlin Steel, Youngstown Sheet & Tube, Inland Steel, Colorado Fuel & Iron, Wheeling Steel, and The Steel & Tube Co. of America.

The depression of 1920-1921 provided a powerful incentive for many steel companies to merge. (Note: Edward B. Greene, an important Cleveland banker and director of Cleveland-Cliffs Iron, noted that the depression made it advantageous for a steel company to manufacture as many different products as it could. That required a significant amount of capital, and there was a serious risk of oversupply once the economy recovered. The alternative was to merge with a company whose products complimented one's own. This incentive lasted until 1930.) In January 1922, there were strong rumors that Inland Steel, Lackawanna Steel, Midvale Steel, Republic Iron & Steel, The Sheet & Tube Co. of America, and Youngstown Sheet & Tube would merge with Brier Hill Steel (the 15th largest steel company), creating a giant half the size of U.S. Steel. The merger fell apart when Youngstown Sheet & Tube pulled out. Lackawanna Steel was purchased by Bethlehem Steel in May, and in November Midvale Steel sold all of its properties except its Nicetown works to Bethlehem. In December 1922, Youngstown Sheet & Tube absorbed Brier Hill Steel, followed by Steel & Tube Co. of America in January 1923.

A rapidly expanding economy in 1923 left little inducement for merger, but by 1927 excessive competition in the steel industry led to significantly lower profits and once again merger rumors were in the air. The Roaring Twenties had created an under-capacity in steelmaking and an over-capacity in steel finishing. The solution was to either spend tens of millions of dollars expanding basic steel manufacturing, with the risk of creating oversupply, or for steel makers and finishers to merge and rationalize the supply chain.

== Eaton's interest in steel ==
In 1901, John D. Rockefeller hired 18-year-old Cyrus S. Eaton as a telegraph room messenger boy. Eaton left after a year to attend McMaster University. Graduating in 1905, he worked as a cowboy in the American West for a year before returning to Cleveland. Rockefeller and others had formed a syndicate to purchase licenses to build electric power stations in the province of Manitoba, Canada. The syndicate hired Eaton, a Canadian citizen, to buy the licenses. When the Panic of 1907 began, the syndicate became disinterested in building the plants. Eaton purchased the licenses from the syndicate, obtained funding from a bank in Manitoba, and began building the power plants himself. The plants were highly profitable, and he soon built a number of others across Canada. He formed his first utility holding company in September 1912, and in November 1912 formed Continental Gas & Electric to purchase and hold natural gas and electric utilities in the American Midwest.

Eaton's net worth was more than $2 million (equivalent to $46,132,000 in 2024) by 1913, and in April 1914 he joined the Cleveland investment banking firm of Otis & Company. He made millions investing in stocks, and was worth $80 million to $100 million by the late 1920s. He was so notoriously wealthy that people in Cleveland called him "rich as Mellon".

At the urging of a friend, shipping magnate Harry Coulby, Eaton began an intensive study of the American steel industry in 1924. He became convinced that the industry was ripe for merger, and that a large, merged company would be highly profitable due to economies of scale and less susceptible to financial distress in the event of an economic downturn. He began looking for a weak steel company to take over.

Eaton's first steel investments were in United Alloy Steel, whose stock Otis & Co. began buying some time in 1924. By 1925, he had purchased significant amounts of stock in a number of steel companies.

== Eaton's first step toward merger: United Alloy Steel ==
Central Steel, based in Massillon, Ohio, was founded in 1914 and began operations a year later. In 1916, J. P. Morgan Jr. refinanced the failing United Steel Company of Canton, Ohio, and renamed it United Alloy Steel. Within a year, United Alloy had built a second steel plant in Canton. Both companies manufactured alloy steel, nearly all of which was consumed by the rapidly expanding automobile industry.

In April 1923, the Cleveland-Cliffs Iron Co. purchased a substantial amount of stock in Central Steel, becoming its largest minority shareholder. Some time in 1924, Cyrus Eaton purchased a large block of stock in United Alloy Steel, becoming one of its largest minority shareholders. Together, Cleveland-Cliffs and Eaton began to work to merge their companies. (Note: The Central and United Alloy plants were only a few miles apart.)

In May 1925, Central Steel and United Alloy began merger talks. The Central Steel and United Alloy reached agreement on everything except the ratio of exchange for their shares in the new company, (Note: United Alloy agreed to a 1-for-1 exchange. Central Steel wanted 2-and-1/8 shares in the new company for each of its existing shares, but United Alloy refused to allow more than a 2-for-1 exchange.) and the merger talks collapsed.

In the summer of 1925, Cyrus Eaton convinced William G. Mather, chairman of Cleveland-Cliffs Iron and a major steel company investor, to join him in consolidating various Ohio steel companies into a larger company that could compete with U.S. Steel and Bethlehem Steel. The Mather-controlled Cleveland-Cliffs began to assist in the endeavor.

By November 1925, Eaton and Mather were ready to try again to merge Central Steel and United Alloy Steel. They needed control of Central Steel, however. The two bought large amounts of Central Steel stock in the fall and early winter of 1925. This heavy buying forcing the share price sharply upward, and it reached an all-time high in early January 1926. Fortuitously, the chairman of Central Steel, C.E. Bibb, died on January 5, 1926. This caused a change in corporate governance favorable to the Mathers; Mather, already a member of the Central Steel board of directors, was now elected to its executive committee. (Note: William G. Mather and his half-brother, Samuel Livingston Mather II had both sat on the board of Central Steel since 1923.)

Eaton, meanwhile, had met with the 62-year-old founder and president of United Alloy Steel, Edward A. Langenbach. Langenbach could fight for control of his company, or, by selling most of his shares to Eaton, could retire a very wealthy man. Langenbach chose retirement, and stepped down on January 8, 1926.

Eaton began to make his move in April. On April 12, Eaton acquired all the United Alloy Steel stock of Edward A. Langenbach for $6 million (equivalent to $84,879,000 in 2024). The transaction was the largest one-time purchase of stock ever made on the Cleveland Stock Exchange, and one of the largest single purchases of stock anywhere in the nation in recent years. The same day, Langenbach and two other directors resigned from the United Alloy board. On April 19, Cyrus Eaton, Joseph O. Eaton, (Note: Joseph Eaton was president of Eaton Axle & Spring, and a partner in Otis & Co. He was no relation to Cyrus Eaton.) and Philip Wick (Note: The Wick family had founded Youngstown Sheet & Tube and Otis Steel, and Philip Wick owned the important local brokerage firm of Wick & Co. He was also an influential financier in the steel industry. He was a good friend of Cyrus Eaton, and was a director of Eaton's holding company, Continental Shares. Wick was also a director of the Central Alloy Steel Corporation, Ohio Iron and Steel Company, First National Bank of Youngstown, and Dollar Savings and Trust Company of Youngstown.) were elected to the board of directors of United Alloy Steel. Eaton's friend, Harry Coulby, who was already a member of the United Alloy board, was elected chairman. Coulby, Cyrus Eaton, and Joseph O. Eaton were named members of the company's executive committee.

Eaton's takeover of United Alloy Steel sparked talk that it would merge with Central Steel and Trumbull Steel. The Cleveland Press reported that Eaton was going to use the same strategy he had used to make millions in utilities: Amalgamation and rationalization.

== Central Steel and United Alloy merge: Central Alloy Steel ==
In April 1926, Otis & Co. formed a new investment company, Continental Shares, whose purpose was to acquire stock in various steel companies. (Note: Charles A. Otis Jr., co-founding partner in Otis & Company, was the son of Charles A. Otis Sr., founder of the Otis Steel Company. According to Cyrus S. Eaton, Otis Steel was nearing bankruptcy in 1925. Eaton provided the funds that got the company through its financial crisis. Realizing that steel companies often required large sums on short notice, Eaton formed Continental Shares to take advantage of that need.) Eaton owned half the company, the shareholders of the iron mining firm Cleveland-Cliffs Iron Mining the other half. (Note: Other investors included business executives like Harry Coulby, Henry G. Dalton, and Samuel Livingston Mather II of the mining and shipping firm Pickands Mather & Co.; William G. Mather of Cleveland Cliffs; and factory owner and banker Truman Handy Newberry. Dalton was also First Vice President of Youngstown Sheet & Tube. As Eaton acquired significant amounts of stock in other steel companies, their executives invested in Continental Shares as well. Among the later investors were James Anson Campbell, president of Youngstown Sheet & Tube; A.E. Adams, director of Youngstown Sheet & Tube and president of the First National Bank of Cleveland; C.H. Booth, director of Youngstown Sheet & Tube; Philip Wick, director of Republic Iron and Steel and of Central Alloy Steel; and John T. Harrington, president of Trumbull Steel.) Continental Shares had $140 million in 1929, making it one of the ten largest investment companies in the United States.

Merger talks between Central Steel and United Alloy began in June 1926. Eaton further strengthened his position at United Alloy to move the talks along. On July 21, the two companies reached an agreement and announced their merger. The new company's name was Central Alloy Steel. (Note: The deal included the United Furnace Company, a wholly-owned subsidiary of United Alloy Steel.)

When the merger was consummated in late August, Cyrus Eaton, Joseph O. Eaton, Philip Wick, William G. Mather, Harry Coulby, and Elton Hoyt II, head of the shipping fleet of Mather family-owned Pickands Mather, all served on the new 15-member board of Central Alloy Steel. The interlocking boards of directors of Otis & Co., Trumbull Steel, Central Alloy Steel, Cleveland-Cliffs, and Pickands Mather led to intense speculation that Trumbull Steel would be the next company to join the emerging Eaton group of steel companies, perhaps even as early as the fall of 1926.

While Central and United were coming together in the summer of 1926, Eaton approached James A. Campbell at Youngstown Sheet & Tube and offered to merge that company with Central Alloy, Otis, and Trumbull. Campbell tentatively agreed, but pulled out after he realized Eaton had no intention of allowing Campbell to be chairman or president of the new company. Without Youngstown, the merger collapsed.

== Second step toward merger: Eaton wins control of Republic Steel ==
It was no longer a secret in the summer of 1926 that Eaton wanted to merge a number of smaller, independent steel companies to create a large steel conglomerate based in the Midwest. The formation of Continental Shares was widely seen as a move toward achieving this goal.

Republic Iron & Steel, organized in 1899, (Note: The Youngstown-based company was created by the merger in May 1899 by 24 rolling mills and blast furnaces in Ohio, Indiana, Illinois, Kentucky, and Pennsylvania. Five more iron and steel makers in Delaware, Alabama, and Minnesota were acquired by it in 1905. Its last purchase was the De Forest Sheet & Tin Plate Co. of Ohio in 1917.) had been in and out of financial trouble from 1923 to 1927. While nearly every other of the top ten largest American steel firms (in terms of tonnage) had grown since 1920 through merger, enlargement, or both, Republic was the only one to shrink: It lost 95,000 annual tons, and whereas it had once been the second-largest independent American steel company it had fallen to fifth. (Note: In 1920, the top ten largest American steel firms, apart from the giant U.S. Steel, were: Bethlehem Steel, 3,133,100 annual tons; Midvale Steel, 2,871,750 annual tons; Jones and Laughlin Steel, 2,640,000 annual tons; Lackawanna Steel, 1,840,000 annual tons; Youngstown Sheet and Tube, 1,500,000 annual tons; Colorado Fuel & Iron, 1,138,000 annual tons; Wheeling Steel, 1,018,000 annual tons; Republic Iron & Steel, 1,395,000 annual tons; Inland Steel, 1,000,000 annual tons; and Steel & Tube Co. of America, 860,000 annual tons. By 1925, the top ten were Bethlehem Steel, 7,600,000 annual tons; Youngstown Sheet & Tube, 5,880,000 annual tons; Jones & Laughlin Steel, 3,000,000 annual tons; Inland Steel, 1,600,000 annual tons; Republic Iron & Steel, 1,300,000 annual tons; Wheeling Steel, 1,273,000 annual tons; Colorado Fuel & Iron, 1,138,000 annual tons; McKinney Steel, 1,000,000 annual tons; and United Alloy Steel, 1,000,000 annual tons. Colorado Fuel & Iron was the only company to neither increase nor decrease annual tonnage in that period.) This made it a good target for Eaton. A Republic-Trumbull combination also made sense in terms of economic rationalization: Republic Iron & Steel primarily produced bars, pipe, and sheet steel, while Trumbull Steel largely made the strip steel and tin plate from which Republic's products were made. Trumbull Steel had more mill capacity than its blast furnace and open-hearth furnaces could provide for. Republic Steel, located just a few miles away, had excess blast furnace and open-hearth capacity.

In October 1926, Eaton formed a private syndicate of wealthy investors with the purpose of acquiring of Republic Iron & Steel common stock. Eaton purchased Republic Iron & Steel stock so quietly that company president John A. Topping remained unaware of it until Eaton informed him. Eaton's goal was to accumulate enough stock so that Topping would take him seriously as an investor and meet with him to discuss a potential merger. Topping either refused to meet or refused any offer of merger, even though by January 1927 The New York Times was reporting that Eaton wanted to build his steel empire around Republic Iron & Steel.

Having failed to persuade Topping, Eaton resolved to force a merger. Eaton ordered Trumbull Steel president John T. Harrington to use $775,000 (equivalent to $11,229,000 in 2024) of the corporation's money to buy Republic stock. From February 28 to March 11, 1927, Trumbull Steel acquired 100,000 shares of Republic Iron & Steel common, more a third of all the shares on the market. (Note: Republic Iron & Steel had 300,000 common shares on the market.) Stock purchases were placed so widely, with so many brokers, that the stock price actually fell from $72 to $70.50 a share the first week of buying before recovering to $72 at the end of the week. The buying pressure was so subtle, the stock price only rose to $74.75 a share by March 11 when Trumbull Steel ceased to make its purchases, and no one at Republic was aware that any large-scale buying was taking place. (Note: There was very little newspaper attention paid to the rise in stock value. The press attributed it to better steel sales.) (Note: The media at the time believed Eaton had purchased this stock through Otis & Co., although Harrington's later statement disproves this.)

On Monday, April 11, the Associated Press broke the news that Eaton had acquired a "substantial interest" in Republic Iron & Steel through open-market buying. The Boston Globe called it a "market coup". The news surprised Republic president John A. Topping, who said he knew of no stock purchased by Eaton. He also denied that Eaton had taken control of his company. By April 12, it was clear Eaton had enough stock to control Republic. Republic's annual meeting was set for Wednesday, April 13, and four seats on the board of directors were open. Eaton demanded that two or more of them be filled by him and his associates.

At Republic's annual meeting, Cyrus S. Eaton, Edward B. Greene, and John S. Brookes Jr. were elected to Republic's board of directors. Only director Howard M. Hanna was re-elected. (Note: Hanna was chairman and president of M. A. Hanna Company, a large coal and iron mining firm based in Cleveland that also owned blast furnaces. He was widely seen as supportive of Eaton. Brookes was the secretary of The Koppers Co., a firm which made coking ovens and was controlled by Andrew S. Mellon. The Koppers Co. purchased a large amount of stock in the United Light and Power Co. in 1926. Cyrus Eaton did so as well, and was named chairman of United Light and Power. Brookes was seen as Mellon's representative on the board of Republic Iron & Steel, and his election indicative of Mellon's support for Eaton.) By April 14, it was clear that Eaton had a one-third ownership interest in Republic. Eaton's control of Republic was widely interpreted as a first step toward the consolidation of his steel interests into a single company. Unnamed associates close to Eaton claimed the financier had no "immediate" plans to merge Republic Iron & Steel, but that did not preclude closer cooperation between Republic, Trumbull, and Central Alloy. Topping asserted the board changes were "incidental" and strongly denied his company would ever merge with Eaton's firms, but the failure to elect corporate officers at the annual meeting seemed to indicate significant changes were coming.

On May 19, Matthew C. Brush resigned from the Republic Iron & Steel board of directors. He was replaced by George N. Humphrey, a close associate of Howard Hanna. News also broke that Republic board member Crispen Oglebay had thrown his support toward Eaton. Five of the nine members of the Republic board now were Eaton allies. (Note: Oglebay was president of Oglebay Norton, a large iron mining and iron ore shipping firm based in Cleveland.)

== Eaton gains control of Trumbull Steel ==
Trumbull Steel entered a financial crisis on July 23, 1925, when it tried to sell $20 million (equivalent to $284,213,000 in 2024) in bonds. This led to the exposure of extensive financial irregularities, including millions of dollars in unreported loans. The company's financial situation was so bad that almost everyone on the board thought receivership was inevitable and the company would have to merge to survive. The company's executive committee calculated it would take $18 million to put the company back on its feet.

When Trumbull Steel's financial troubles began, Eaton turned his attention to it. By October 1925, he was owner of one of the largest blocs of Trumbull Steel common stock. In November, Eaton offered to underwrite an $18 million bond issue. He saved Trumbull Steel. Eaton began purchasing more Trumbull Steel shares in late February 1926. As the stock price moved upward, rumors again swirled of a merger between Central, Trumbull, and United Alloy. By April, Eaton and his investment firm, Otis & Co., held a majority of the stock of Trumbull Steel.

== Pre-merger moves by Trumbull Steel ==
The Trumbull Steel board of directors met on April 14, 1927, and for the first time Cyrus Eaton was in attendance. On the table was a proposal that Trumbull spend $1.5 million (equivalent to $21,734,000 in 2024) to enlarge its open-hearth steelmaking capacity by 30 percent. The board declined to make a decision. Expansion would have indicated that Trumbull Steel intended to stay independent and compete with Republic Steel, so the board's inaction was widely interpreted as indicating a coming merger.

Two days later, Trumbull Steel announced it would make steel ingot purchases from Republic Iron & Steel.

On April 22, Cyrus Eaton was elected to the executive committee of Central Alloy Steel.

Merger rumors became stronger. The Cleveland Press reported in mid April that at least some Trumbull Steel shareholders had been approached by Eaton to gauge their requirements for a merger. By May 1, The New York Times was saying that Youngstown Sheet & Tube, Central Alloy Steel, Trumbull Steel, and Otis Steel were said to be involved in the merger talks. Many industry observers believed additional talks would be held behind the scenes at the semi-annual meeting of the American Iron and Steel Institute in mid May. Although Republic president John A. Topping again denied that any such talks were occurring, Eaton's new majority on Republic's board of directors indicated that Topping was no longer in control of the company's future.

== Trumbull and Republic merge ==
The New York Times and Pittsburgh Press reported a "definite trend" toward steel company consolidation in the Midwest in late October 1927. On November 19, shares of Trumbull Steel preferred rose sharply higher on the Cleveland and New York City stock exchanges as merger rumors intensified. The companies involved were, again, said to be Youngstown Sheet & Tube, Trumbull Steel, and Central Alloy Steel.

On Friday, November 25, the presidents of Trumbull Steel and Republic Iron & Steel announced that their boards of directors had approved a merger. Holders of Trumbull Steel preferred would get one and two-thirds shares of Republic preferred, while holders of Trumbull common would get a one-fifth share of Republic common. (Note: On January 14, J. Fred Walder, who had 12 shares of Trumbull Steel common, filed two lawsuits in an Ohio Court of Common Pleas to stop the merger. One lawsuit claimed that Trumbull Steel executives had paid Otis & Co. $775,000 so that it could purchase Republic Iron & Steel stock. The other asserted that Trumbull Steel had been "dominated" by Cleveland-Cliffs Iron during the creation of the Trumbull-Cliffs Furnace Company, causing Trumbull Steel to pay $530,000 in dividends to Trumbull-Cliffs Furnace stockholders at a time when it had not paid dividends to its own stockholders for some years. Liquidating the blast furnace company, as required under terms of the merger with Republic, would cost Trumbull Steel stockholders $1.5 million. Both lawsuits were tried together in June 1930. Testimony during the trial confirmed that Trumbull Steel had used corporate funds to purchase Republic Iron & Steel stock in February and March 1927. The trial ended on June 24. The trial court held that Trumbull Steel's actions were illegal, but the issue was moot as Trumbull Steel had sold the stock back to Republic in 1927 at cost. The trial court did award Waldeck $75,000 in attorney fees and $7,500 for costs. Republic Iron & Steel, the successor company to Trumbull Steel, appealed the ruling and won. Waldeck appealed to the Supreme Court of Ohio, but it declined to hear the case in November 1932, leaving the appellate court ruling intact.) Shareholders of Republic Iron & Steel approved the merger on January 25, 1928, followed by Trumbull Steel's shareholders on February 16.

At an organizing meeting on April 18, Elmer T. McCleary, a vice president of Youngstown Sheet & Tube, was elected president of the merged company. Harry T. Gilbert of Sharon Steel Hoop was elected vice president, and John U. Anderson of Trumbull Steel was elected treasurer. McCleary, Gilbert, and John T. Harrington were elected to the board of directors. The assets of Trumbull Steel were formally acquired by Republic on April 27, and Trumbull Steel ceased to exist. The combined company had assets of $200 million, making it the fifth largest steel manufacturer in the United States.

== Aftermath ==
Eaton acquired Donner Steel in September 1929 and Central Alloy Steel purchased the Interstate Steel Company in October 1929.

In December 1929, the merger Eaton had been working on for five years came together as Central Alloy Steel, Donner Steel, and Republic Iron & Steel merged. Joining them was another Ohio steelmaker, the Bourne-Fuller Company. The merged company was called Republic Steel.

== Bibliography ==
- American Iron and Steel Institute (1920). Directory of the Iron and Steel Works of the United States and Canada. Nineteenth edition, corrected to May 1st, 1920. New York: American Iron and Steel Institute. OCLC 7685220.
- American Iron and Steel Institute (1926). Directory of the Iron and Steel Works of the United States and Canada. Twentieth edition. New York: American Iron and Steel Institute. OCLC 7685220.
- Boldt, V.J. (May 7, 1927). "Is A Steel Merger Pending?". The Magazine of Wall Street. hdl:2027/uc1.c2612497.
- "Cleveland Cliffs Files Answer". Finance & Industry. February 25, 1927. pp. 9–12, 21.
- Gleisser, Marcus (2005). The World of Cyrus Eaton. Kent, Ohio: Kent State University Press. ISBN 9780873388399.
- Securities and Exchange Commission (1942). "Investment Trusts and Investment Companies": Report of the Securities and Exchange Commission Pursuant to Section 30 of the Public Utility Holding Company Act of 1935. Part Four: Control and Influence Over Industry and Economic Significance of Investment Companies. Washington, D.C.: U.S. Government Printing Office.
- Subcommittee of the Committee on Education and Labor (1939). Violations of Free Speech and the Rights of Labor. Part 23: "Little Steel": The Republic Steel Corporation. U.S. Senate. 75th Cong., 3rd sess. Washington, D.C.: Government Printing Office.
- Temporary National Economic Committee (1940). Investigation of Concentration of Economic Power. Hearings Before the Temporary National Economic Committee. Part 18: Iron and Steel Industry: Iron Ore. 76th Cong., 2d sess. Washington, D.C.: U.S. Government Printing Office.
