= Trumbull-Cliffs Furnace Company =

American blast furnace and coking company, 1920 to 1930

Coordinates: 41.213°N 80.8172°W

Trumbull-Cliffs Furnace Co.
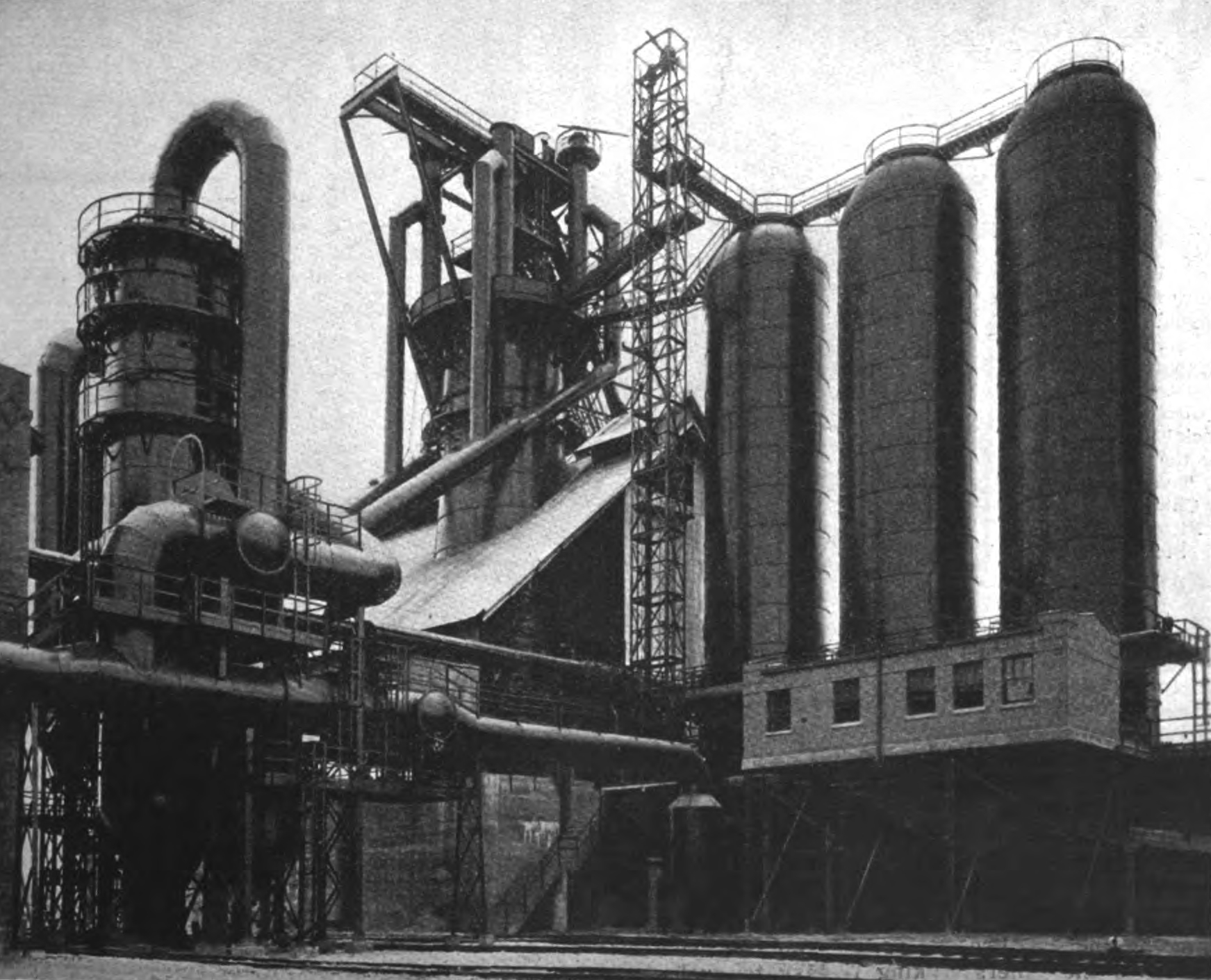
- Trumbull-Cliffs blast furnace in 1921
- Company type: Public
- Industry: Pig iron and coking byproducts
- Founded: June 6, 1920; 105 years ago
- Founder: Trumbull Steel and Cleveland-Cliffs Iron Co.
- Defunct: December 31, 1929; 96 years ago
- Successor: Republic Steel
- Headquarters: Warren, Ohio, U.S.

The Trumbull-Cliffs Furnace Company existed from 1920 to 1930. It operated a pig iron blast furnace and coking factory in Warren, Ohio, in the United States. The company was jointly organized by Trumbull Steel of Warren and Cleveland-Cliffs Iron Co. of Cleveland, Ohio. At the time it was built, it was likely the largest blast furnace in the United States. Trumbull Steel lacked the finances to build its own blast furnace, so it sought help from Cleveland-Cliffs. This led to a complicated financial structure.

Trumbull Steel merged with Republic Iron & Steel in 1928. Two years later, Republic bought out Cleveland-Cliffs Iron's interest in the blast furnace. This ended the Trumbull-Cliffs Furnace Company's independent history.

== Background ==
Trumbull Steel wanted to secure a regular supply of pig iron for its open-hearth furnaces. The obvious solution was to build a blast furnace adjacent to the steel plant, but Trumbull Steel lacked the financial capacity to build it and had no staff knowledgeable in the operation of a blast furnace.

== Contract with Cleveland-Cliffs ==
On April 20, 1920, Trumbull Steel and Cleveland-Cliffs Iron Co. entered into a contract to build a blast furnace at Warren, Ohio. The two firms jointly incorporated the Trumbull-Cliffs Furnace Company on May 6, 1920. The new firm was capitalized at $5 million (equivalent to $59,133,000 in 2024), issuing 40,000 shares of 8% preferred stock and 100,000 shares of no-par common stock. Each parent company spent $250,000 to purchase one half of Trumbull-Cliffs Furnace common stock. Cleveland-Cliffs spent $4 million to purchase all the preferred stock at par and appointed 4 of the 7 directors of the new company. Trumbull Steel had the right to buy out Cleveland-Cliffs after a certain period. The contract was approved by the Trumbull Steel board of directors.

The cost of the blast furnace land, construction, and equipment was estimated by the contract to cost $3.5 million (equivalent to $41,393,000 in 2024). Should there be cost overruns, Trumbull Steel was required to furnish these funds. In return, Trumbull Steel would receive preferred stock equal to the amount of the cost overruns. The contract also required Cleveland-Cliffs Iron to build and operate the blast furnace and to sell its products. In exchange for doing so, Cleveland-Cliffs received 1.5% of the net price of the pig iron the furnace sold to Trumbull Steel, and 2.5% of the net price of pig iron sold to other parties.

Trumbull Steel was a co-partner with Cleveland-Cliffs in the Mesaba Cliffs Iron Mining Co., and received one-fourth of the output of the mining company's iron mines. The Trumbull-Cliffs Furnace contract required Trumbull Steel to sell its Mesaba Cliffs iron ore to the blast furnace at regular market prices. If this did not provide all the ore needed by the blast furnace, then Trumbull-Cliffs was obligated to purchase ore from Cleveland-Cliffs Iron.

== First supplemental agreement ==
Cleveland-Cliffs intended to sell its Trumbull-Cliffs preferred stock on the open market and recoup its investment costs. The post-World War I depression left it unable to do so, and this put financial strain on Cleveland-Cliffs. On May 26, 1920, Trumbull Steel and Cleveland-Cliffs Iron signed a supplemental agreement: Until such time as Trumbull-Cliffs Furnace could pay dividends on its preferred stock, Cleveland Cliffs would pay the dividends in cash and receive 8% interest bearing promissory notes from the furnace company in lieu of the zero-interest implied debt of deferred dividends. This and a guarantee to redeem the preferred stock at par in case of liquidation was intended to reassure investors to which Cleveland Cliffs was trying to re-sell the stock (which included its own employees). (Note: On occasion over the next five years, Cleveland-Cliffs asked for some of the promissory notes to be bought by Trumbull Steel, and Trumbull complied and in doing so furnished some of the cash dividends paid to third party investors holding the preferred stock.) In Moody's Manual this arrangement boiled down to "[Trumbull-Cliffs Furnace Co. preferred stock is] guaranteed as to principal and dividends by the Cleveland Cliffs Iron Company". Cost overruns required an increase to 45,000 preferred shares on December 1, 1920.

== Construction ==
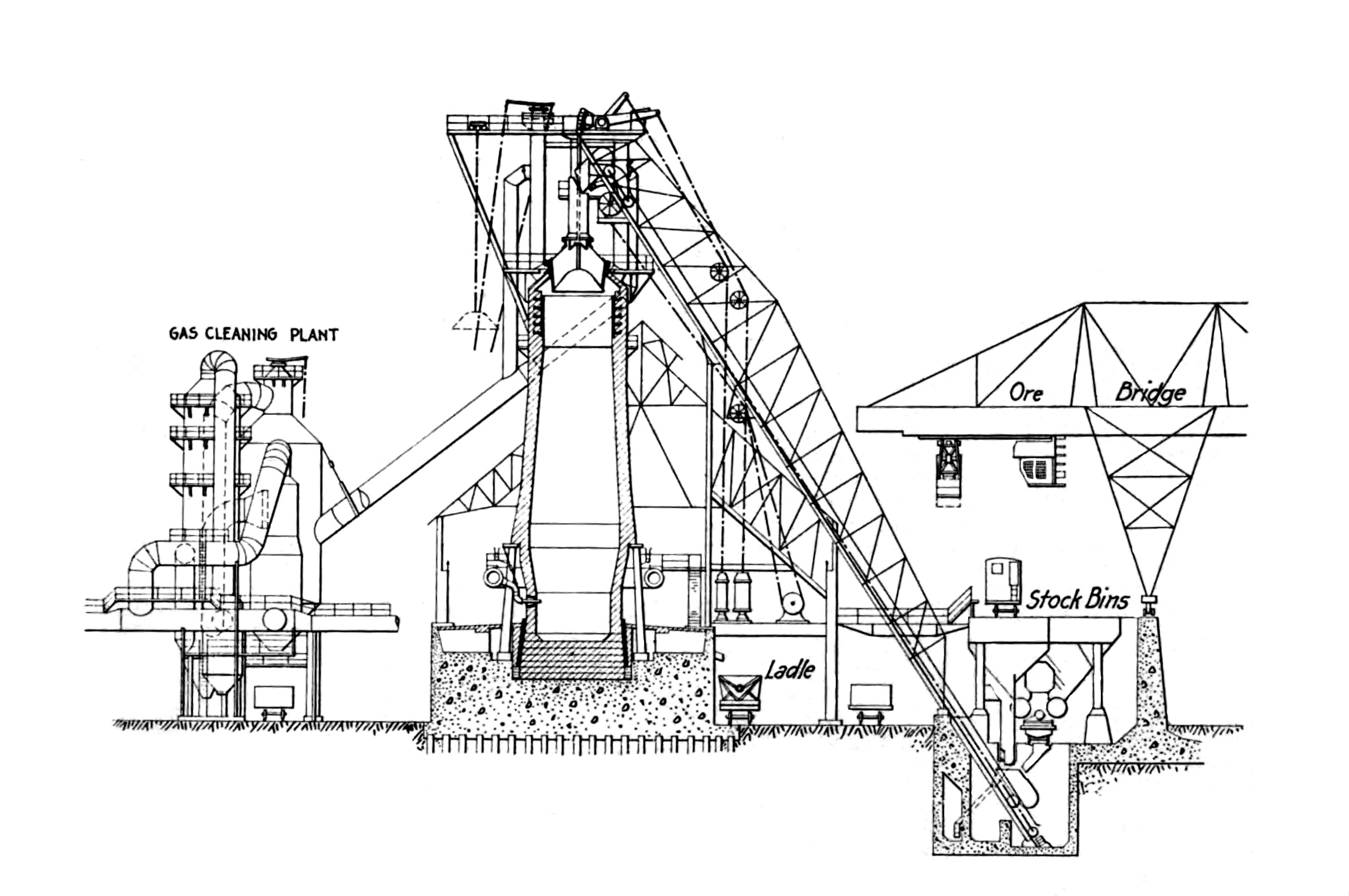
Side schematic layout of the blast furnace at Trumbull-Cliffs Furnace Co.

The Trumbull-Cliffs Furnace Co. purchased land on the Mahoning River directly opposite the Trumbull Cliffs steel plant, on which it erected a 600-short-ton (540 t) blast furnace. That made it 20% larger than the average blast furnace, the largest blast furnace in the Mahoning Valley at the time, and the largest blast furnace in the nation in terms of capacity. (Note: The blast furnace was rated at 600 short tons (540 t) per day, but could easily make 700 short tons (640 t) per day or more.) The press estimated the cost to be $3.5 to $4 million (equivalent to $41,393,000 in 2024 to (equivalent to $47,306,000 in 2024), somewhat higher than the contract's estimate.

Work on the site began the third week of May 1920. The company subsequently announced on May 27, 1920, that it would build a large coke and coke by-products plant as part of the blast furnace. The foundation of the blast furnace was laid on August 15, 1920, and it was completed June 14, 1921. That was a construction time record for a furnace that large.

== About the plant ==
The Trumbull-Cliffs blast furnace was designed by Freyn, Brassert & Co. of Chicago.

As Trumbull Steel had much unused land, (Note: The company owned 600 acres (240 ha) of land on the west bank of the Mahoning River, but only about 30% was used by the steel plant.) it agreed to allow raw materials to arrive and be stored at the steel plant before being transported to the blast furnace. The blast furnace, in turn, would transport molten pig iron to the open-hearth furnaces of the steel plant.

The company wanted to build a "hot metal bridge" over the Mahoning River to provide this transportation connection. Title to the river was held by the U.S. federal government, so Congress had to pass a law permitting construction of the bridge. The company requested the legislation in September 1920, and President Warren G. Harding signed it into law in late May 1921. The bridge was a three-track concrete bridge. Ladles on rail cars transported the molten metal, while regular gondola cars carried raw materials. As raw materials arrived at the blast furnace, they were unloaded by a rotary car dumper that could handle 30 cars per hour. The cradle could move the entire length of the raw materials yard, placing the material in a concrete trough beneath the hoist.

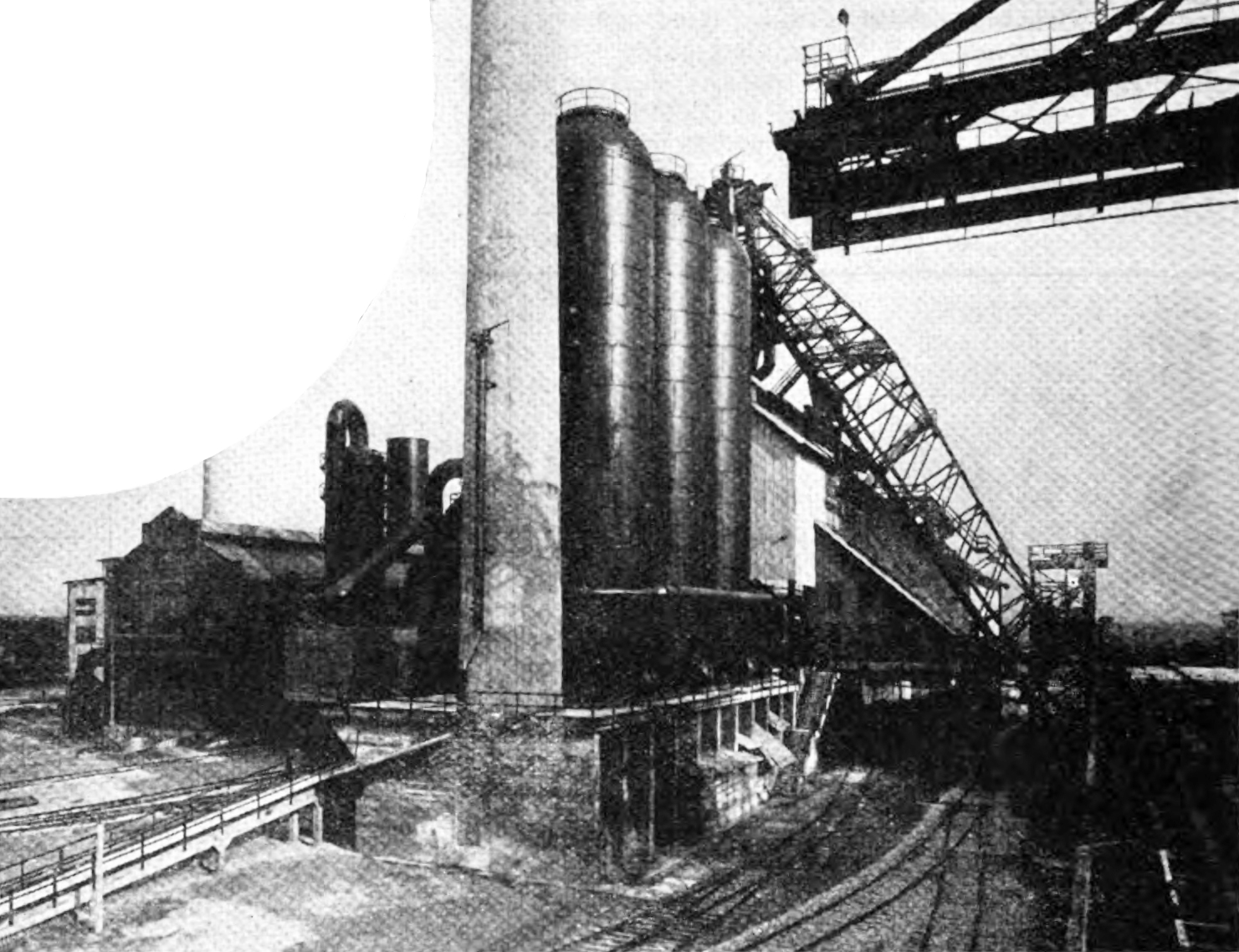
Hoist and ore storage bins at Trumbull-Cliffs Furnace.

The hoist was 171 feet 6 inches (52.27 m) long, and ran on a double track. It was of a new design which had a cantilever over the blast furnace. Not only did this provide more room for raw materials beneath the hoist, it also made the hoist more rigid and put no thrust on the blast furnace. The hoist used 11-short-ton (10.0 t) buckets to scoop up material. Raw material could be delivered to a storage trough on the far side of the blast furnace, raw material stock bins in the cast house, or a 50-short-ton (45 t), side-dumping, electric gondola "transfer car" on rails.

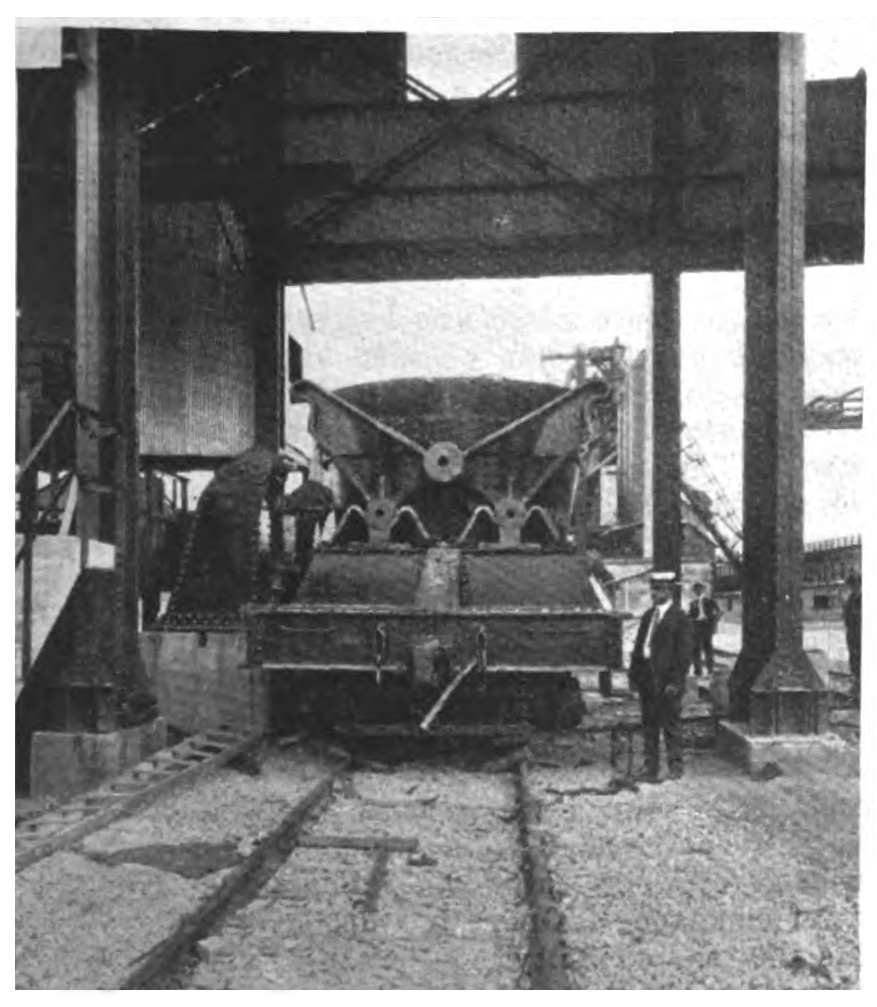
Ladle on a rail car at the cast house.

Both Blast Furnace & Steel Plant and Valve World magazines called the design and layout of the cast house "outstanding". The cast house was 145 feet (44 m) wide and 102 feet (31 m) long, with a central aisle more than 95-foot (29 m) wide. Tracks ran down the aisle, one for moving molten iron and the other for spotting (Note: "Spotting" is the process of correctly positioning a rail car for loading and unloading.) and waste removal. The cast house also had coke, iron ore, and limestone storage bins, and a mixing room for clay, coke braize, and sand. (Note: Coke fuel was almost always compressed into brick for use in blast furnaces. Some debris always remained, however. This could be collected and sized for use in other ways. "Braize" was the term for coke bits smaller than 0.875 inches (22.2 mm) but larger than 0.75 inches (19 mm).) There were nine ore bins, five limestone bins, four coke bins, and a central double-size coke bin. "Scale cars" ran on tracks below and beside the bins. These cars had equipment which showed how much load they were carrying, which permitted accurate measurement of raw materials before they were loaded into the blast furnace. The central coke bin fed coke to the scale cars. Blast Furnace & Steel Plant pointed out that the central bin was fitted with an "innovative" set of electrically powered screens which removed all coke pieces less than 0.75 inches (19 mm) in size and shunted them aside, which provided more uniform coke which burned more efficiently.

The cast house also contained a pig iron casting machine. This could take cooled iron and cast two 11-foot (3.4 m) iron rails at a time.

The blast furnace could produce 600 short tons (540 t) of pig iron a day. It was 94 feet (29 m) tall, had a bosh 24 feet (7.3 m) in diameter, and a hearth 15 feet 6 inches (4.72 m) in diameter. Three Freyn-Brassert stoves heated the air which fed the furnace's tuyeres. The blast furnace was designed so that additional capacity could be added without interrupting the plant's operation.

The flue gas cleaning system was located adjacent to the blast furnace. It featured a 22-foot (6.7 m) by 40-foot (12 m) dust catcher, a 22-foot-6-inch (6.86 m) dust whirler, and a gas washer.

Behind the gas cleaning system was a boiler house 150 feet (46 m) long, 55 feet (17 m) wide, and 43 feet (13 m) high, featuring a stack 225 feet (69 m) high. The five 800 horsepower (600 kW), class "M", Stirling boilers were of a new design, with exceptionally large volume and very high temperature settings. Each boiler had a distinct combustion chamber for natural gas and coal, so that coal stokers could be installed or the boilers expanded without interrupting their operation. A "Dutch oven" could be added to each boiler to generate even more power.

Valve World and The Iron Age magazines said the plant's water supply system deserved "particular mention" for its simplicity and efficiency. The pump house had a "novel design" which provided redundant backup water supply. The Iron Age also praised the "ingenious" safety system which used a sump basin and float which could divert water to the bustle pipe if the bustle ran low on water. To improve the supply of water to the blast furnace, Trumbull Steel built a weir dam on the Mahoning River 2 miles (3.2 km) downstream in 1922. Congress approved the legislation permitting the dam in July 1921.

Blast Furnace & Steel Plant lauded the "considerable advance in design" of the power house, which was 1,540 feet (470 m) long, 60 feet (18 m) wide, and 33 feet (10 m) high. It also noted that blast furnace plant had a much-improved system of natural gas delivery, one that was safer, easier to clean, and provided much-needed overhead space.

The blast furnace plant had rail connections to both the Pennsylvania Railroad and the Erie Railroad at its north end, and a connection to the Baltimore and Ohio Railroad at south end was planned.

== The coking factory ==
When the foundations of the blast furnace itself were laid in August 1921, Trumbull-Cliffs Furnace announced it would also build a large coking factory as part of the larger plant. This, too, was designed so that it could be enlarged in the future without interrupting its operation.

With onset of the post-war depression, the project did not begin moving forward until February 1923. The estimated cost of the coking plant, which had 47 coke ovens, was $3 million (equivalent to $42,875,000 in 2024). Trumbull-Cliffs Furnace financed the plant by issuing $3 million in 6% 20-year first mortgage bonds. Cleveland-Cliffs Iron agreed to let the project go ahead, even though payment of first mortgage bonds came ahead of payments for preferred stock dividends.

Construction on the coking factory began in January 1924. The coke ovens, which made coke and byproducts to be used by Trumbull Steel's plant across the river, were designed and built by the H. Koppers Co. of Pittsburgh. The plant was finished the first week of June and first charged on July 7, 1924.

The plant produced various industrial gases, tar, benzole, and ammonium sulfate. Trumbull-Cliffs Furnace estimated the coking plant could earn up to $900,000 (equivalent to $12,862,000 in 2024) a year.

== Second supplemental agreement ==
The press widely reported that the final cost of the Trumbull-Cliffs Furnace was $3 million to $3.25 million. In fact, construction costs for the blast furnace were $5.3 million. Partly this was due to high post-war inflation, but partly of it was because Trumbull Steel had demanded alterations to the blast furnace that would enable it to be easily expanded in the future.

Trumbull Steel did not have the money to pay for the overruns. As Cleveland-Cliffs was unwilling to purchase more preferred stock and fund the cost overruns itself, (Note: The second supplementary agreement contained a new clause in which Trumbull Steel agreed to pay all accrued dividends on 5,000 shares of preferred and to redeem those 5,000 shares of preferred at $500 per share if Trumbull-Cliffs Furnace went into receivership.) Trumbull Steel and Cleveland-Cliffs signed another supplemental agreement on November 23, 1921.

Under the second supplemental agreement, the $1 million in initial capitalization set aside for working capital was used to pay for the overruns and an additional $1,300,000 would have to be raised. Trumbull-Cliffs Furnace agreed to seek bank loans and to issue promissory notes to obtain these extra funds. (Note: With effects of the depression still lingering, Trumbull Steel and Cleveland-Cliffs agreed that they each would guarantee payment on one half of the promissory notes in order to get them to sell. These guarantees allowed Trumbull-Cliffs Furnace to obtain bank loans at 1% to 2% below the prevailing market rate. In the end, Trumbull-Cliffs Furnace could not obtain all the financing it needed, so both Cleveland-Cliffs and Trumbull Steel loaned it cash (although Trumbull Steel loaned it less money than Cleveland-Cliffs did).) This second supplemental agreement was also approved by the Trumbull Steel board.

== Blast furnace operations ==
Even though the Trumbull-Cliffs blast furnace was ready to make pig iron by June 1921, it did not go into operation because Trumbull Steel had signed contracts that required it to buy pig iron from other companies through the end of 1921, and the post-war depression had drastically reduced the amount of pig iron Trumbull Steel needed. The blast furnace was finally blown in (Note: "Blown in" means to heat the furnace in preparation for the smelting of iron.) on January 15, 1922. The market price of pig iron remained so low, however, that Trumbull-Cliffs Furnace lost money in 1922, 1923, and 1924.

Trumbull Steel was able to completely meet Trumbull-Cliffs Furnace's need for iron ore. When it came to coal, Cleveland-Cliffs Iron not only helped the Furnace secure coal but also used its economic muscle so the Furnace Co. could purchase coal at a below-market price. From its inception until the end of 1927, the Trumbull-Cliffs Furnace made 1,451,164 short tons (1,316,474 t) tons of pig iron, of which 1,373,575 short tons (1,246,086 t) (94.6%) went to Trumbull Steel. Just over three-quarters (1,049,418 short tons (952,016 t)) of this pig iron was molten, creating a savings of $1 to $2 per ton of steel for Trumbull Steel. (Note: As a comparison, in mid-1927 steel bars were selling for $3,700 per ton.)

In January 1923, the Trumbull-Cliffs blast furnace set a world record for a single month's production of 23,634 short tons (21,440 t).

The Trumbull-Cliffs Furnace coke plant began operation in September 1924. The coke plant was also operated by Cleveland-Cliffs Iron, even though the 1920 contract did not remunerate it for this. Operations included the marketing and sale of excess coke and coke byproducts on the open market.

Purchasing coke and coke byproducts from Trumbull-Cliffs, Trumbull Steel was able to significantly cut its costs. Trumbull Steel also purchased more gases and tar from Trumbull-Cliffs than it needed, and sold this surplus on the open market.

Once the market from steel improved, Trumbull-Cliffs Furnace began to make a good deal of money in 1925 and 1926. (Note: Furnace gross and net earnings were almost never made public. It is known that the Furnace had $120,000 in net earnings in the first quarter of 1926.)

== Refinancing ==
Trumbull-Cliffs Furnace had issued $4.5 million in preferred stock, and by the end of 1924 had repurchased $500,000 of it. By the start of 1925, Cleveland-Cliffs Iron had disposed of 30,000 shares of the 40,000 shares of Furnace preferred stock in its possession.

In February 1925, the Furnace Co. decided to redeem all outstanding shares of 8% preferred stock and replace it with 6% preferred. The exchange was 1.25 shares of 6% for every 1 share of 8%, with the 8% preferred redeemed at $107 a share.

But Furnace shareholders were reluctant to sell their preferred stock, so Cleveland-Cliffs Iron sweetened the deal by agreeing to guarantee payment of dividends on the new 6% preferred. Cleveland-Cliffs also used its reputation to help Trumbull-Cliffs sell the new preferred on the market.

On December 16, 1925, the board of directors of Trumbull Steel agreed to insure Cleveland-Cliffs against any loss on its 11,250 shares of 6% preferred, and agreed to pay 22.5% of all preferred dividends Trumbull-Cliffs Furnace awarded.

== Expansion and sale ==
In November 1926, Trumbull-Cliffs Furnace announced it would spend $500,000 to build an 17 additional coke ovens, increasing its capacity by 35%. The cost would have been higher, but the byproduct recovery plant was already large enough to handle this added capacity.

The period of joint ownership of Trumbull-Cliffs Furnace came in 1930. Republic Iron & Steel had absorbed Trumbull Steel in April 1928.

On December 31, 1929, Republic agreed to give Cleveland-Cliffs Iron 22,340 of its common shares in exchange for Cleveland-Cliffs Iron's interest in the blast furnace company. In addition, Republic agreed not to sell or dissolve the furnace company before January 1, 1945. If it did so, then it still had to purchase the iron ore the furnace would have obtained from Cleveland-Cliffs. (Note: On January 21, 1930, this agreement was slightly amended so that Republic Steel could use the Cleveland-Cliffs ore at any of its furnaces, not just the Trumbull-Cliffs Furnace.)

Republic Steel (the 1929 successor to Republic Iron & Steel) continued to operate the Trumbull-Cliffs Furnace until 2012. It was demolished in October 2017, and was the last blast furnace in the Youngstown Steel District to come down.

== Bibliography ==
- "Blast Furnace to Be Built by Cleveland-Cliffs and Trumbull Steel interests". The Iron Trade Review. May 13, 1920. pp. 1414–1415.
- "Cleveland Cliffs Files Answer". Finance & Industry. February 25, 1927. pp. 9–12, 21.
- "New 600-Ton Blast Furnace Plant". Blast Furnace & Steel Plant. October 1921. pp. 588–597. hdl:2027/mdp.39015080085395.
- "New Trumbull-Cliffs 600-Ton Blast Furnace". The Iron Age. September 15, 1921. pp. 673–679.
- "Special Features of Blast Furnace Plant". The Iron Age. September 22, 1921. pp. 730–732. hdl:2027/hvd.hxhdnz.
- Subcommittee of the Committee on Education and Labor (1939). Violations of Free Speech and the Rights of Labor. Part 23: "Little Steel": The Republic Steel Corporation. U.S. Senate. 75th Cong., 3rd sess. Washington, D.C.: Government Printing Office.
- Temporary National Economic Committee (1940). Investigation of Concentration of Economic Power. Hearings Before the Temporary National Economic Committee. Part 18: Iron and Steel Industry: Iron Ore. 76th Cong., 2d sess. Washington, D.C.: U.S. Government Printing Office.
- "Trumbull-Cliffs Company's New Blast Furnace". Valve World. April 1922. pp. 134–137. hdl:2027/mdp.39015075080625.
