= Trumbull Steel =

American steel company, 1912 to 1935

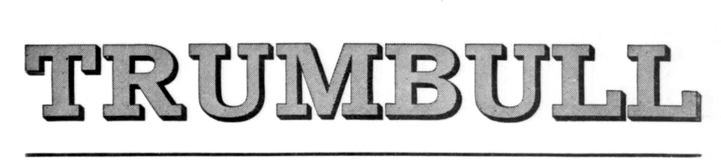
- Type: Public
- Industry: Steel
- Founded: April 25, 1912; 114 years ago
- Founder: Jonathan Warner
- Defunct: April 27, 1928; 98 years ago
- Successor: Republic Steel
- Headquarters: Warren, Ohio, U.S.
- Number of employees: 6,500 (1924)

Trumbull Steel was an American finished steel and tinplate manufacturer based in Warren, Ohio, in the United States. Founded in 1912, it opened its first steel plant on July 23, 1913. The company rapidly expanded its plant over the next decade, and acquired Liberty Steel in 1919. An attempt to float $20 million in bonds in 1925 exposed financial mismanagement and embezzlement by the company's president. Investor Cyrus Eaton from Cleveland, Ohio, took advantage of the collapse in stock price to seize control of the company. Trumbull Steel became profitable again. Eaton merged Trumbull Steel with Republic Steel on November 25, 1927, ending Trumbull's corporate existence.

== Founding ==
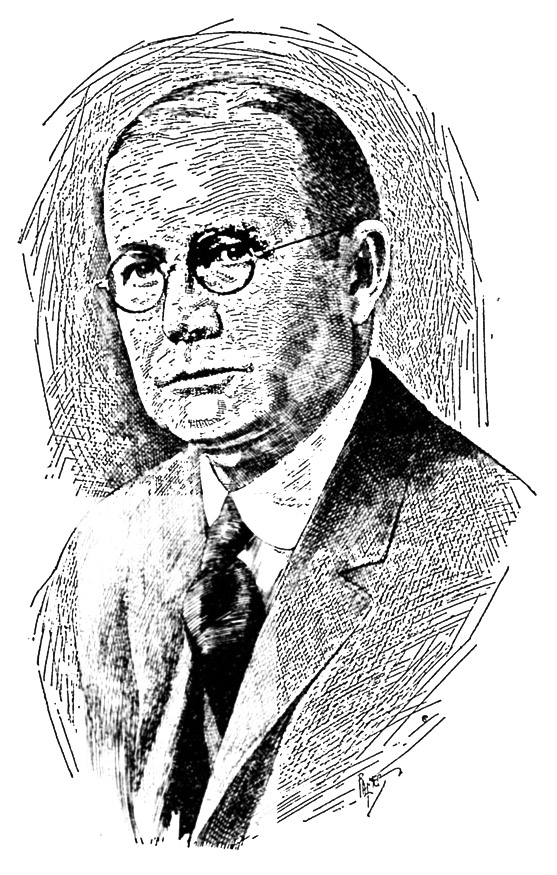
Jonathan Warner in 1925

Trumbull Steel was incorporated in the U.S. state of Ohio on April 25, 1912. The incorporators were Jonathan Warner, Daniel W. Kerr, W.T. Hardesty, William H.B. Ward, and John T. Harrington. The moving force and founder of the company was Jonathan Warner. Since the 1830s, the Warner family had operated blast furnaces, sheet mills, and tinplate works in Ohio's Mahoning Valley. (Note: Steel is initially cast in ingots. An ingot with a section 6 square inches (39 cm^{2}) or larger is a bloom. An ingot or bloom rolled to a flat section not less than 2 inches (51 mm) square or round and a width of at least 12 inches (300 mm) is a slab. An ingot or bloom rolled to 1.5 inches (38 mm) square or round and cut into lengths is a billet. An ingot or bloom rolled to a thickness of less than 2 inches (51 mm) and a width from 6 to 12 inches (150 to 300 mm) is a sheet bar. "Sheet plate" and "sheet steel" are rolled from white-hot slabs; however, sheet steel may also be rolled from hot or cold sheet bars. "Steel plate" weighs approximately 10 pounds (4.5 kg) per square foot, and is usually 0.25 inches (6.4 mm) thick. Steel plate has a maximum width of 132 inches (3,400 mm). "Steel sheet" is defined as No. 10 U.S.S. Gage, which is 5.625 pounds (2.551 kg) per square foot and approximately 0.140625 inches (3.5719 mm) (9/64th) thick. Steel sheet is seldom more than 54 inches (1,400 mm) in width and 180 inches (4,600 mm) in length.) Warner became the superintendent of Russia Sheet Mills in Niles, Ohio, in 1891. After James Summers, founded of Struthers Iron & Steel in Struthers, Ohio, died in 1898, Warner bought into the firm and oversaw construction of three new sheet mill stands in 1899. (Note: A stand is a device through which hot or cold steel is rolled in order to reduce its thickness and width. It consists of one or more working rollers (heavy cylinders between which the metal passes), backup rollers (larger heavy cylinders which help reduce the deflection of the working rollers), a mechanism ("screwdown") to adjust the gap between the working rollerss, a housing, and a drive train. There are a number of configurations for mill stands.) Struthers Iron & Steel became part of American Sheet Steel Co. in February 1900 as part of a massive industry-wide consolidation. Warner became a manager in the new company. American Sheet Steel merged with the American Tin Plate Company in November 1903 to become American Sheet & Tin Plate Co., and Warner became assistant to the senior vice president of the new firm as well as head of its operating department. He resigned in March 1904,

In April 1906, Warner, W.T. Hardesty, and William H.B. Ward bought the Empire Iron & Steel Co. of Niles, Ohio. Hardesty was one of the nation's foremost experts in the design and operation of steel-making facilities, and had erected the first tinplate mill in the United States at Niles, Ohio, in 1892. He had been a district manager for American Sheet & Tin Plate before becoming superintendent of Empire Iron. Warner, who provided most of the capital for the acquisition of Empire, then sold the company to Garry Iron & Steel of Cleveland, Ohio, in May 1910.

Warner re-entered the steel industry by providing the seed capital for Trumbull Steel. To raise additional money, he sold stock in the company to his personal friends. The firm was initially capitalized at $1 million (equivalent to $24,108,000 in 2025).

Trumbull Steel acquired a 57-acre (23 ha) site on the Mahoning River at Warren, Ohio, for its new mill. (Note: Additional land acquisition expanded this to 70 acres (28 ha) by 1913.) The company was named for Trumbull County, in which the city of Warren was located. The site (41.22576°N 80.8135°W) was adjacent to both the Erie Railroad and the Pennsylvania Railroad.

Initially, the new company said in May 1912 that it intended to erect a tinplate plant consisting of six hot-rolled sheet stands, capable of making 28-inch (710 mm)-wide sheets. The plant would have a capacity of 35,000 short tons (32,000 t) a year and employ 400 to 500 people. By the end of July, it had added another six cold-rolling stands and three more hot rolling stands.

Trumbull Steel increased its capitalization to $1.25 million (equivalent to $30,136,000 in 2025) in August 1912, a clear sign that it intended to build a larger plant than announced.

Initial construction focused on a sheet mill building 80 feet (24 m) wide and 1,000 feet (300 m) long, a tin mill 70 feet (21 m) and 500 feet (150 m) long, a boiler house, a warehouse, and an office building. Construction of the facility was hindered by delays in the delivery of structural steel for the buildings and by heavy flooding in the Mahoning River valley in April 1913.

== Plant as built ==
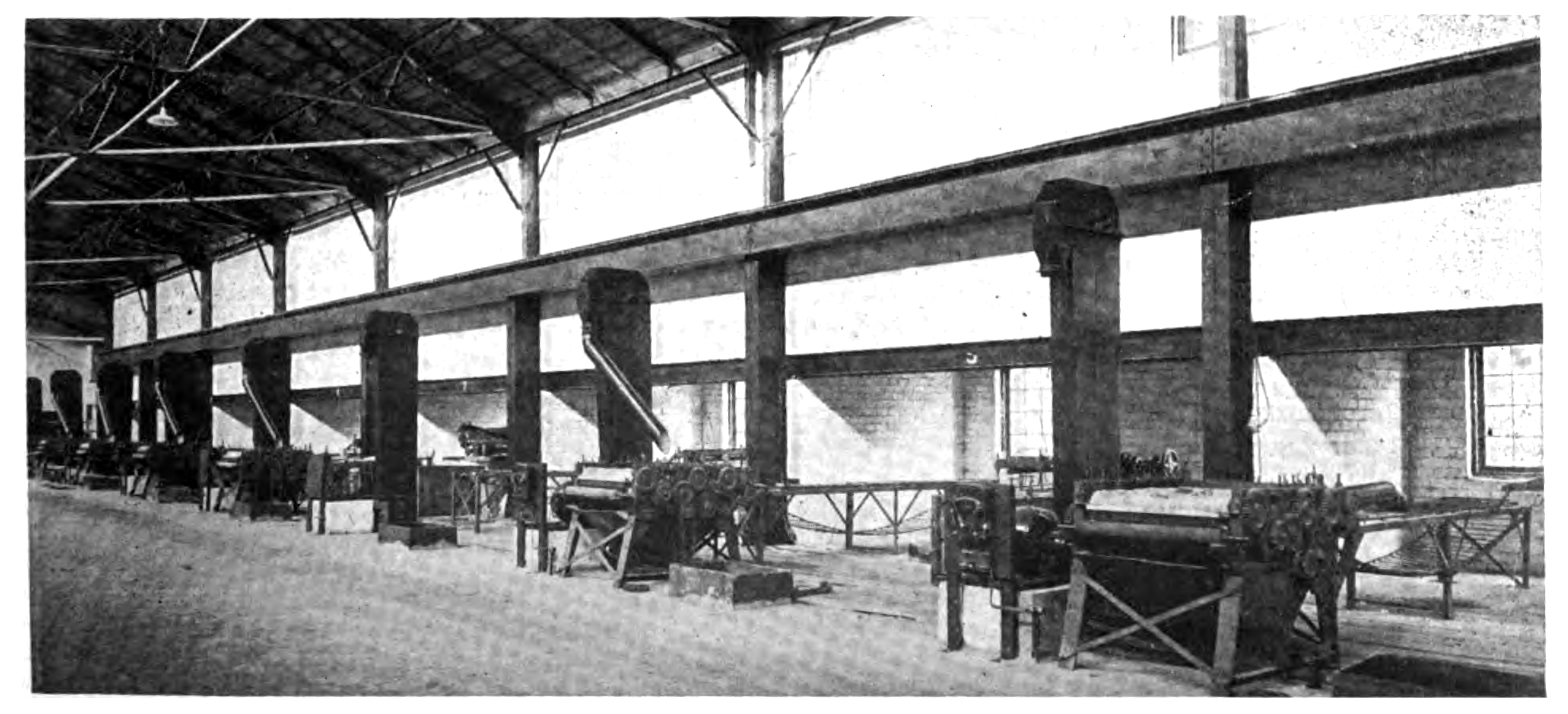
Tinplating department in 1913 at Trumbull Steel.

Trumbull Steel's plant opened with test manufacturing runs on July 23, 1913, on a 70-acre (28 ha) site. Four sheet stands were running and 1,000 men at work. Another eight sheet stands were ready for completion within two weeks.

At the east end of the rolling mill was a sheet bar storage area capable of holding 10,000 short tons (9,100 t).

The main sheet finishing building was 800 feet (240 m) long and 250 feet (76 m) wide and consisted of three aisles, each of which had one or more overhead cranes to move material. The south aisle was 68 feet (21 m) wide and contained six hot-rolling stands. Against the south side of the building was a lean-to which enclosed 18 furnaces for heating steel. The middle aisle was 42 feet (13 m) wide and contained the shearing department, where hot-rolled steel was cut to length and squared (if not intended to be coiled). There were five 114-inch (2,900 mm) and six 48-to-60-inch (1,200 to 1,500 mm) shears. (Note: Some sheet was cold-rolled before annealing, while the rest went straight to annealing. Sheet intended to be tinned underwent pickling before going to the tin house. After pickling, tinplate was annealed to soften it, then given three more passes through the cold-rolling stands. It was then repickled and reannealed before being moved to the tin house in tank cars full of clean water.) The north aisle contained 13 cold-rolling stands, three tandem hot-cold stands, and the annealing and pickling departments. The pickling department contained tanks with strong sulfuric acid, diluted hydrochloric acid, and water (for rinsing away acid). The cooling beds were also located in this area. A lean-to against the north side of the building enclosed the eight annealing furnaces. The stands could handle coils of steel up to 30 inches (760 mm) in diameter, whereas most stands at the time could handle only 26-to-28-inch (660 to 710 mm) coils. Sheets made at the plant ranged from 12 to 30 gauge, and came in an assortment of lengths and widths.

Parallel to and north of the main building was the 440-foot (130 m) long, 43-foot (13 m) wide tin mill. It had six stands for hot-rolling sheet, six hot-rolling stands for black sheet, 13 stands for cold-rolling, and its own crane. (Note: Sheet bar is usually heated and then sent through a rolling stand ("hot rolling") to reduce it to about half the specified width and length. The steel is then sent through more hot rolling to reduce it to specifications. At this point, steel is known as "black sheet", and is ready for pickling, annealing, and cold-rolling.) The tin mill could manufacture tin plate, high-grade steel plate terne, charcoal iron terne, long strip terne, charcoal tin, fire door plate, and furnace pipe. The roofing department of the tin mill had a corrugating machine, crimping machine, curving machine, two die-work hammers, and a painting machine. There was even a machine which attached locks to shingles. The roofing department could make formed roofing products such as corrugated roofing and siding, roll and capped roofing, plain and self-capping roll roofing, plain and corrugated ridge roll, metal ceiling, metal shingles, metal tile, roofing gutters, and narrow conductor pipe.

A galvanizing and tinning plant 600 feet (180 m) long and 150 feet (46 m) wide ran parallel to and north of the tin house. It contained three galvanizing pots and 20 tinning pots. The north side of this structure was for storage and shipping, while the galvanizing and tinning departments occupied the south side. The galvanizing department had its own crane and was separated from the tinning area by a steel partition to prevent galvanization fumes from interfering with the tinning process.

The plant's annual capacity was 60,000 short tons (54,000 t) a year. (Note: That was up from the planned 50,000 short tons (45,000 t) a year.) The company-owned rail yard adjacent to the plant had the capacity to handle 50 flatbed or box cars and had its own Davenport Locomotive Works-built switching engine to move them around. Tracks ran from the west end of the main building to the tin house, and from the east end to the galvanizing house. These tracks were depressed in the earth so that the beds of the rail cars were level with the mill floor to afford easy roll-on/roll-off of material.

A Gothic Revival-style brick office building was to the west of the plant.

The total cost of the plant was $2 million (equivalent to $47,859,000 in 2025). Trumbull Steel lacked the cash to pay for the plant, so it issued $250,000 (equivalent to $6,027,000 in 2025) in bonds through local banks.

== Pre-war expansion: 1913 to 1917 ==
Even before the plant opened, Trumbull Steel built a 100-foot (30 m) extension to its tin house and a 100-foot (30 m) extension to its galvanizing department to accommodate two new galvanizing vats, new cooling beds, and new pickling vats.

In November 1913, it added two new cold-rolling stands and built a ninth annealing furnace.

=== Doubling capacity and first capitalization increase ===
Less than six months after its first plant opened, Trumbull Steel added a 50 percent increase in its production capacity by installing six 36-inch cold-rolling tin mills, four 25-inch cold-rolling sheet mills, and two convertible cold-rolling mills (which could roll sheet or tin). (Note: Initially, the company intended to add 10 new sheet hot-rolling mills, and a new bar mill.) A new 600-foot (180 m) long, 75-foot (23 m) wide building was erected to accommodate the expansion.

The doubling of sheet stands practically constituted an entire new factory. The changes increased annual capacity to 120,000 short tons (110,000 t), and doubled the workforce to 2,000 men. All the new equipment was installed and operating by the end of January 1915.

To pay for the expansion, Trumbull Steel formally increased its capitalization to $2.5 million (equivalent to $59,274,000 in 2025).

=== Second capitalization increase ===
In July 1915, Trumbull Steel's board of directors asked stockholders to raise the company's capitalization to $4 million (equivalent to $91,964,000 in 2025) through the issuance of $1.5 million in stock, $750,000 of which would be preferred stock and $750,000 common stock. (Note: The stock traded on both the Cleveland and Youngstown local stock exchanges.) The company had already spent $500,000 (equivalent to $11,496,000 in 2025) to purchase 22 acres (8.9 ha) of new land, lengthen the bar shed to 500 feet (150 m) from 420 feet (130 m), extend the main mill building by 380 feet (120 m), add a second 500-foot (150 m) bar shed, extend its coal trestle by 500 feet (150 m), add a 420-foot (130 m) addition to the annealing department, add a 400-foot (120 m) addition to its galvanizing department, add 358 feet (109 m) to its shearing department. (Note: These additions doubled the size of the annealing, galvanizing, and shearing departments.)

Stockholders approved the stock issuance on August 7.

Filling the new space were eight new hot-rolling mills. (Note: Of the new stands, four were hot-rolling sheet mills, two were hot-rolling tin mills, and two were hot/cold mills. These latter two were "jobbing mills", intended to be used for small, one-off orders. When completed, the Trumbull Steel plant had 18 sheet stands, 12 tin stands, and two jobbing stands. This indicates some stands were replaced, rather than additions made.) This gave Trumbull Steel a new capacity of 175,000 short tons (159,000 t) a year, making it the largest steel sheet-rolling plant in the Mahoning Valley and one of the largest producers of sheet steel in the nation. The additions led employment at the mill to rise by 400 workers to 2,100. Trumbull Steel was also the first steel plant in the United States to use a new interchangeable hot/cold mill.

The company then acquired an additional 30 acres (12 ha) of land to accommodate future expansion.

=== Third capitalization increase ===
In January 1916, the officers of Trumbull Steel asked stockholders to approve yet another increase in capitalization, this time increasing the amount of stock by $6 million (equivalent to $122,449,000 in 2025). The increase was made up of $3,759,000 in common stock common and $2,250,000 in preferred. Stockholders approved the increase on February 23.

Trumbull Steel said it planned to spend $3 million (equivalent to $61,225,000 in 2025) to add 16 cold-rolling sheet stands, a 100-by-200-foot (30 by 61 m) addition to its cold rolling mill building, a new office building, and as many as 10 open-hearth furnaces so it could make its own steel ingots and billets. As Trumbull Steel was already one of the largest sheet and tin concerns apart from U.S. Steel, this would dramatically increase its annual output. (Note: Eight of the new cold-rolling sheet stands were online by September 7. Two hot-rolling sheet mills, three cold-rolling sheet mills, and two hot-cold "jobbing" mills came online the third week of October 1916. Installation was delayed some months due to late delivery of castings and rolls.) To accommodate the company's increased manufactures, the Pennsylvania Railroad began adding another track to its line between Warren and Ashtabula, Ohio, and between Warren and Pittsburgh, and the Mahoning Valley Railway extended its line to the plant.

=== Fourth capitalization increase ===
In October 1916, Trumbull Steel's board of directors asked stockholders to approve another stock expansion, issuing another $2.5 million in common (equivalent to $41,340,000 in 2025) and $1.25 million in preferred (equivalent to $20,670,000 in 2025) A quarter of a million dollars would be used to retire all of its outstanding bonds. (Note: Its entire outstanding bond issue of $250,000 was retired before the end of 1916.)

Apparently, the $6 million raised eight months earlier was not enough to build the open-hearth furnaces, because Trumbull Steel pledged to use $3 million (equivalent to $49,608,000 in 2025) of the new funds to immediately erect five of the planned 10 100-short-ton (91 t) open-hearth furnaces. It also announced it would build a mill capable of producing 36-inch (91 cm) wide blooms and bars. With these improvements, Trumbull Steel would be able to make chrome, manganese, and nickel steel.

=== Larger expansion than planned ===
The company began construction on five open-hearth furnaces and four soaking pits (Note: After casting, mostly-solidified steel ingots are removed from the molds and placed on end in a furnace. Usually set in the ground, this is the "soaking pit", a natural gas furnace where the ingots are heated to a uniform temperature of about 2,300 °F (1,260 °C). "Soaking" in such intense heat equalizes the temperature throughout the ingot, improving its malleability for hot-rolling and inhibiting cracking.) in late November 1916, with an anticipated opening in the fall of 1917.

Without informing stockholders or the public, Trumbull Steel began work on a much larger expansion than previously announced. The company purchased more land, giving it a total of 300 acres (120 ha), and began construction on a new cold rolling mill. The cold-rolling mill was due for completion in April 1917, (Note: It opened on May 8. Completion of the mill was delayed by late delivery of equipment.) and cost about $250,000 (equivalent to $4,134,000 in 2025). Its six stands made thin sheet steel for the automobile and furniture industry, and provided 500 new jobs. It was the very first rolling mill in the nation whose stands were electrically, rather than steam, driven.

Trumbull Steel told the press that the combined cost of the open-hearth furnaces and the new mill was between $6 million and $7 million. Despite having raised $9.75 million in new capital, President Warner told the Youngstown Vindicator newspaper that "additional monies are needed" and "have been provided for", but did not say where the money was coming from.

In its first-ever public annual report, Trumbull Steel said it had gross revenue of $15 million (equivalent to $248,038,000 in 2025) and gross earnings of $9.2 million (equivalent to $152,130,000 in 2025) in 1916, even after refusing to sell steel for munitions for the war raging in Europe. It paid out $400,000 (equivalent to $6,614,000 in 2025) in preferred dividends, and retained $1.5 million (equivalent to $24,804,000 in 2025) in "surplus profit". (Note: The company revealed it had $300,000 (equivalent to $6,897,000 in 2025) in retained earnings in 1915. Total retained earnings by 1916 were later adjusted to $2 million (equivalent to $33,072,000 in 2025).)

In April 1917, the company had decided to make yet another unannounced expansion by erecting a new 1,000-foot (300 m) long and 100-foot (30 m) wide hot-rolling sheet mill as well. The cost of this mill was about $500,000 (equivalent to $8,268,000 in 2025). When the six hot-rolling mill stands were completed in December 1917, Trumbull Steel's total employment stood at just over 5,000 men. (Note: Completion of the mill was delayed by late delivery of equipment.)

=== Additional expansion ===
Stockholder approval for the October 1916 proposed capital expansion finally came in late June 1917. The company issued $2 million (equivalent to $33,072,000 in 2025) in 7% preferred stock, and put on the market $400,000 (equivalent to $6,614,000 in 2025) in unissued common stock. The new stock issuance brought total capitalization to $12 million (equivalent to $198,431,000 in 2025).

By September 1917, Trumbull Steel was also at work constructing the previously announced two-high 36-inch (91 cm) blooming and billet mill. It was also adding a bluing mill, doubling the number of tin mills, adding three galvanizing vats and 11 tinning vats, and building two coal pulverization machines. This pulverized coal replaced natural gas as the company's primary heating source. It was an experimental process, one that garnered the company national notice in The Iron Age, one of the industry's premiere publications.

By the end of 1917, Trumbull Steel had opened seven open-hearth furnaces and raised the number of employees to 4,000 from 3,000.

== War-time operations ==
The United States entered World War I on April 6, 1917. The war-time demand for steel significantly boosted Trumbull Steel's finances. Gross revenue in 1917 was $26.24 million (equivalent to $433,902,000 in 2025), a 175% increase over 1916. Earnings after EBIDTA was $5,750,000 (equivalent to $95,081,000 in 2025), and the company ended up spending $5 million (equivalent to $82,679,000 in 2025) on expansion to keep up with demand.

Trumbull Steel brought its new hot-rolling strip mill online in December 1917. Its experiment with pulverized coal had proven a success, so it also brought put in service two more 5-short-ton (4.5 t) coal pulverizers, which provided energy to all of its stands, furnaces, annealing ovens, tinning machines, and galvanizing operations. The innovative use of pulverized coal won the company a second major article in Iron Age.

Two of Trumbull Steel's ten new 100-ton open hearth furnaces, its 36-inch (91 cm) blooming mill, and its sheet bar and billet mill began operation in March 1918, making Trumbull the first company to make steel in Trumbull County. It was already the third largest tinplate maker in the country.

=== Fifth capitalization increase ===
To keep up with the demand for steel, Trumbull Steel asked stockholders in April 1918 to approve an $8 million (equivalent to $113,514,000 in 2025) issuance of new common stock to pay for further expansion. Stockholders gave their approval in mid May. Three more open-hearth furnaces came online in August.

=== Innovation in hot-rolled and cold-rolled steel ===
At the end of 1918, Trumbull Steel brought online a new hot-rolling and a new cold-rolling mill, both of which garnered attention in the industrial press for their innovative layouts. The hot-rolling mill building was 1,000 feet (300 m) long and 100 feet (30 m) wide. The mill had five 20-inch (51 cm) "roughing" stands, which rolled ingots and billets into their rough strip forms, followed by five 20-inch (51 cm) "edging" stands, which removed burrs and other material from the sides of the strip which might cause jams. The strip then passed through five 20-inch (51 cm) finishing stands. The finishing stands could roll steel strips anywhere from 3.5 inches (89 mm) to 16.75 inches (425 mm) in width, and about 0.5 inches (13 mm) in thickness. With adjustments, the finishing stands could roll strip as wide at 22 inches (560 mm). The mill had a cooling bed 185 feet (56 m) long and 22 feet (6.7 m) wide. After cooling, strip steel could be left flat and cut to length or coiled onto rolls. The last 200 feet (61 m) of the hot-rolling mill consisted of storage space. The mill had a capacity of 7,500 short tons (6,800 t) a month.

After passing through the hot mill, strip went to the pickling department, which was housed in a separate building 1,000 feet (300 m) long and 74 feet (23 m) wide. A covered runway allowed an overhead crane to move pickled steel to the cold-rolling mill.

The cold-rolling mill was 360 feet (110 m) long and 100 feet (30 m) wide, and parallel to hot mill. The stands in the mill could make strip anywhere from 0.5 inches (13 mm) to 16 inches (410 mm) in width, and 0.008 inches (0.20 mm) to 0.375 inches (9.5 mm) in thickness. The cold mill's pickling department could be limed and pickled, or pickled and then oiled. The cold-rolling mill had a capacity of 4,000 short tons (3,600 t) a month.

The annealing department was housed in yet a third building, 400 feet (120 m) long and 60 feet (18 m) wide, and featured six double-furnaces. A shipping department occupied the last portion of the annealing building. A protected shipping platform 240 feet (73 m) long and 50 feet (15 m) wide was at the end of the annealing department, and connected to the cold rolling mill.

=== War-time profits ===
World War I ended on November 11, 1918. It was a mixed year for Trumbull Steel, financially. Gross revenue held stable at $27 million (equivalent to $383,109,000 in 2025), but earnings after EBIDTA dropped by 44% to $3,216,488 (equivalent to $45,639,000 in 2025). Despite heavy expansion in 1917 and 1918, the company still employed only about 5,000 men.

== Post-war operations ==
In November 1918, Trumbull Steel became an investor in the Consolidated Steel Company, a new company established by roughly 15 smaller steel companies under the auspices of the Webb-Pomerene Act to promote export of their products.

=== Sixth capitalization increase ===
In April 1919, Trumbull Steel executives sought another expansion in the company stock, adding $4 million (equivalent to $55,416,000 in 2025) in preferred stock. This would bring the company's total capitalization to $24 million (equivalent to $332,494,000 in 2025). The firm said it intended to use the stock to purchase an interest in iron ore reserves on Mesabi Range of Minnesota, spend $1.5 million expanding its highly finished steel production capacity, and purchase an interest in the newly-formed Liberty Steel. Stockholders approved the increase in early May. Although Trumbull Steel held $1 million in common and $4 million preferred stock in its treasury, it placed $2 million in common and $2.7 million in preferred stock on the market in May.

=== Steelworker strike of 1919 ===
By the fall of 1919, Trumbull Steel employed roughly 5,000 people. The size of the city of Warren had doubled due to the employment opportunities provided by the company.

Although nearly all steel manufacturers were virulently anti-union and few steelworkers were unionized at the time, Trumbull Steel was relatively neutral toward unionization efforts and signed a contract with the Amalgamated Association of Iron and Steel Workers (AA) in the fall of 1913.

As the AA threatened a general strike in the steel industry in the fall of 1919, Trumbull Steel signed a new contract with the union, breaking ranks with other independent steelmakers. The contract contained a no-strike clause. AA members at Trumbull Steel nevertheless engaged in a wildcat strike on September 22. Trumbull Steel argued this abrogated the collective bargaining agreement, and AA national leaders rushed to Warren to persuade the workers to return to work. The wildcat strike at Trumbull ended on October 11.

=== Capacity expansion of 1920 ===
At the end of 1919, Trumbull Steel added two continuous stands for making bands, hoops, and strip and purchased additional land on which to build.

Construction began on a 1,100-foot (340 m) long, 100-foot (30 m) wide building to house a new 9-inch (23 cm) hot-rolled strip mill and a 1,200-foot (370 m) long, 100-foot (30 m) wide building to house a new 14-inch (36 cm) hot-rolled strip mill. Both new buildings were parallel to its existing cold-rolling mill.

The 14-inch mill was designed to handle steel bars of varying thickness and up to 30 feet (9.1 m) in length. The company also began work on extensions to its cold rolling mill building. The cold-rolling mill doubled its capacity by adding three 8-inch (20 cm) stands; three 12-inch (30 cm) stands; a 10-inch (25 cm) and 16-inch (41 cm) stand working in tandem, followed by two 8-inch (20 cm) combination stands; (Note: A "combination stand" combines a roughing stand and a guide for shaping (also called a "looping stand").) a 20-inch (51 cm) and 24-inch (61 cm) stand working in tandem; and a 12-inch (30 cm) and 20-inch (51 cm) stand working in tandem (as an auxiliary stand). The capacity of the annealing department was also doubled. The changes allowed Trumbull Steel to add 150,000 short tons (140,000 t) to its annual capacity, which was now 400,000 short tons (360,000 t). The total cost of the improvements, which Trumbull Steel said it financed from earnings, was $3 million (equivalent to $36,469,000 in 2025). The new continuous hot mills garnered national attention in the mainstream financial and steel industry specialized press in September 1920, (Note: The 9-inch hot rolling mill was completed in September 1920, while the 14-inch hot rolling mill was completed in early 1921.) but neither went into immediate operation due to the depression that began in January 1920.

Once again, it was a mixed financial year: The company had gross revenue of $24,569,841 in 1919 (equivalent to $340,389,000 in 2025), a drop of almost 10%. Its earnings after EBIDTA were $2,388,258 (equivalent to $33,087,000 in 2025), down almost 25%. (Note: Another source reported 1919 EBIDTA earnings even lower, at $2,195,866.)

=== Depression and stock restructuring ===
A severe depression occurred in the United States from January 1920 to July 1921.

In April 1920, Trumbull Steel executives asked stockholders to approve a restructuring of its stock. Management wanted employees to become stockholders in the firm, but the high price of the common stock prevented most workers from buying it. Under the restructuring proposal, the amount of common stock would increase by $11 million (equivalent to $133,721,000 in 2025) to $25 million (equivalent to $303,911,000 in 2025). Stockholders approved the restructuring on May 18. Pursuant to the plan, Trumbull Steel set aside $2 million in par-value common stock for employees to purchase and declared a special 25% dividend on all common stock. (Note: Executives had initially proposed a 75% dividend on all common stock, to encourage stockholders to approve the split. The board of directors thought this excessive, and trimmed it to 25%.) It then declared a 4-for-1 common stock split, reducing the common stock's par value to $25 from $100 so that it was more affordable for workers.

Gross revenues in 1920 were $35,850,811 (equivalent to $435,819,000 in 2025), a 35% increase over 1919. Net earnings were $2.5 million (equivalent to $30,391,000 in 2025), a slight increase.

== Trumbull Steel in the Roaring '20s ==
Trumbull Steel initiated no new expansion at its mill in 1921, but did erect a 4-foot (1.2 m) high weir dam on the Mahoning River to ensure better water supply for its plant. Operation of its 9-inch mill began in May as economic conditions improved.

Financial data for 1921 reflected the downturn in the economy: The firm had gross revenue of $12,851,000 (equivalent to $183,354,000 in 2025), a decline of 64.2%. Net earnings were $200,000 (equivalent to $2,854,000 in 2025), down 92% from 1920. Rumors that Trumbull Steel might merge with one or more other independent steel manufacturers swirled all year. President Jonathan Warner told stockholders that an invitation to merge had been received during the year, but he had declined it. Despite the depression, Trumbull Steel employed more than 6,000 men in 1921.

=== Praise for the new strip mills ===
Renewed merger rumors in early 1922 lead Trumbull Steel executives to again deny that the company intended to merge.

Already the third largest tinplate manufacturer in the United States, with economic recovery under way the company at last opened its 14-inch strip mill in late May 1922. The new mill garnered much attention in the steel industry press for the ingenuity and efficiency of its layout. The new mill meant that Trumbull Steel could manufacture 40,000 short tons (36,000 t) of billet, sheet bar, blue sheet, black sheet, galvanized sheet, galvanized roofing, painted roofing, electric sheet, black tinplate, tinplate, hoops, bands, hot-rolled strip, and cold-rolled strip a month. Its workforce of 6,000 men made up half the workforce of Warren. Improving market conditions finally allowed the company to put its 14-inch band, hoop, and strip mill into operation in late December 1922. The Iron Age praised the mill's innovative pickling process in a feature article.

For the year ending December 31, 1922, Trumbull Steel had gross revenue of $23,163,760 (equivalent to $349,843,000 in 2025) and net earnings of $700,000 (equivalent to $10,572,000 in 2025). Although a major improvement over the 1921 numbers, net earnings were down 70% compared to the comparable 1919 fiscal year.

=== Seventh capital expansion ===
In 1923, Trumbull Steel sought to simplify its financial and organizational structure. Executives proposed issuing $5 million (equivalent to $73,451,000 in 2025) of preferred stock, and exchanging $1 million (equivalent to $14,690,000 in 2025) of the new issue for the existing preferred stock of Liberty Steel on a one-to-one basis. Liberty Steel would then be dissolved. The company also proposed issuing $1.5 million (equivalent to $22,035,000 in 2025) in no-par common stock and exchanging it on a share-for-share basis with the existing $25 par value common stock. This had the benefit of making it even easier for employees to buy the firm's stock.

The company said it intended to use the remaining capital raised by the preferred stock issue to expand the number of open-hearth furnaces. (Note: This was not a new idea. The company had floated the idea of additing eight open-hearth furnaces in August 1922. Trumbull Steel said it had purposefully overbuilt its blooming mill and bar mill to handle this amount of extra capacity.) Stockholders approved the plan in early February, (Note: Trumbull Steel had $1 million in $25 par value common stock on the market, and $520,000 in the same in its treasury.) after which the company announced that it would build five to seven more open-hearth furnaces at a cost of $3 million (equivalent to $44,071,000 in 2025). (Note: It settled on five at the end of 1924.)

A mild recession occurred in the United States beginning in May 1923, and lasted a year. The recession hit the steel industry particularly hard, and did not bottom out for the industry until July 1924. (Note: Economists and industry executives characterized the downtown as mild at the time, but by early 1925 realized it had been much worse than reported.) Trumbull Steel made no major improvements that year, although it did begin using a new device called a syndolagger for making and repairing slag and steel tapholes in open-hearth furnaces. That won the company national attention.

Trumbull Steel had gross revenue of $31,205,614 in 1923 (equivalent to $458,417,000 in 2025), an increase of more than a third. Net earnings soared to $5,850,040 (equivalent to $85,938,000 in 2025), and executives decided to retain $2 million (equivalent to $29,380,000 in 2025) in earnings as surplus.

=== Last round of improvements ===
With all the expansion over the past seven years, Trumbull Steel now owned more than 700 acres (280 ha) of land. At the end of 1924, Trumbull Steel said it would spend $500,000 on upgrades to its plant, including improvements to its galvanizing department. Although seemingly minor, the changes would increase the company's annual capacity to 700,000 short tons (640,000 t). (Note: The bulk of Trumbull Steel's product was shipped to automakers Detroit, and to steel finishing plants in northern Michigan and northern Ohio.) At the end of 1924, Trumbull Steel began using pulverized coal as a fuel for all of its mill and annealing furnaces. The firm said it would save 25% a year on fuel costs.

Trumbull Steel announced that its gross revenue for 1924 was $26,201,521 (equivalent to $389,789,000 in 2025) and its net earnings $2,243,888 (equivalent to $33,381,000 in 2025). It had a retained-earnings surplus of $476,923 (equivalent to $7,095,000 in 2025), which brought its total surplus from 1913 to present to $10,611,416 (equivalent to $157,862,000 in 2025). The company also said its total employment had now risen to 6,500 workers.

In February 1925, the company began installing new boilers and upgrading all its piping. The same month, 841,000 shares of its common stock began trading on the New York Stock Exchange's curb market. In July, it began construction on the first of its new 100-ton open-hearth furnaces. The company also purchased two 125-ton rail cars to handle larger amounts of molten steel, installed new heating furnaces in its tin mills, and began experimenting with a new type of furnace in its rolling mills.

At the beginning of July, Trumbull said it was doing preliminary engineering drafting work on an eighth open-hearth furnace.

== Financial scandal of 1925 ==
A financial scandal engulfed Trumbull Steel in the latter half of 1925 which led to the resignation of founder and president Jonathan Warner, and a shift in control of the corporation.

=== The attempted bond sale ===
The crisis began on July 23, 1925, when Warner announced that Trumbull Steel would sell $20 million (equivalent to $292,140,000 in 2025) in bonds to pay expenses incurred for plant expansion. The offering was huge, the third-largest bond sale in the United States thus far in 1925.

Announcement of the sale elicited strong opposition from several Trumbull Steel board members and many stockholders. Several board members had opposed the plan when Warner told them about it, and tried to halt Warner's negotiations with National City. Others said Warner had never informed them about a forthcoming sale. Some board members said all past improvements had already been paid for, and they had no idea what the proceeds would be used for.

Several influential stockholders also said they had received no advance notice of a sale from the company. Plant expansion in the past had been paid for out of earnings, they had been told; now, the company was saying it had gone $3 million into debt to pay for the improvements.

On July 30, holders of substantial blocs of preferred stock informed the press that there was a large $10 million (equivalent to $146,070,000 in 2025) discrepancy between the company's 1924 annual financial statement and the financial information given to the underwriting banks.

This information triggered "pandemonium in Ohio" and a large sell-off of Trumbull Steel stock. Youngstown-area investors, owners of some of the biggest blocs of Trumbull securities, "were almost panic stricken". Most of stock on the market was being offered by Youngstown-area industry insiders or wealthy people, those in the best position to know if Trumbull Steel would survive or not. The price of common stock reached an all-time low, and the Youngstown Vindicator reported that moneyed interests in Cleveland were freely purchasing the common stock.

=== Evidence of financial impropriety ===
By August 23, some members of Trumbull Steel's board of directors had discovered evidence of embezzlement by president Warner.

Board members John T. Harrington and Philip Wick confronted Warner in his home in Youngstown, accompanied by James Anson Campbell, the president of Youngstown Sheet & Tube, and A.E. Adams, a vice president of the First National Bank of Youngstown. In an emotional meeting, Warner confessed to embezzling millions of dollars from the firm to support a lavish lifestyle. He also admitted to spending enormous sums since 1916 trying to grow Trumbull Steel out of its financial difficulties, and ended up only incurring large corporate debts. To cover that up, he had paid dividends out of capital and secretly taken out $17.5 million in bank loans.

Harrington, Wick, Adams, and Campbell agreed that to avoid receivership, public confidence had to be maintained at all cost. They told Warner that they would not seek his arrest and indictment, but Harrington demanded that Warner turn over all his personal assets to Trumbull Steel, which Warner did the next day.

=== Attempted merger with Otis Steel ===
Warner had also sought a merger with one or more other steel companies in an attempt to save Trumbull Steel.

Rumors that Trumbull Steel might merge with one or more other "independent" steel firms emerged in mid May 1925. The idea of merger was pushed by the Mather family, New York-based investors in Trumbull Steel, and Cleveland banking interests, which felt they could not indefinitely sustain so many indepenent firms.

Trumbull Steel was one of the firms at the center of the talks. At the American Iron and Steel Institute general meeting, held May 20–21 in New York City, the merger talks went "beyond the stage of mere discussion".

By late June, a merger of Trumbull Steel Otis Steel, Midland Steel, and United Alloy Steel was complete "on paper", and news of the rumored merger made national headlines. Unnamed steel industry executives told the Pittsburgh Post that merger talks between Trumbull and Otis Steel had been going on since May.

Final discussions were held on August 27 and 28 in New York, with representatives from the First National Bank, Union Trust Co. of Cleveland, and the New York City investment bank of Blair & Company present. In attendance were Jonathan Warner, Philip B. Wick, and John T. Harrington. Additional meetings between executives and managers of the three firms occurred in Cleveland, along with local bankers.

Otis Steel and Trumbull Steel announced that they would merge on August 28. The following day, the merger was put on hold when a "difference of opinion" emerged as to the value of Trumbull Steel's inventory.

Trumbull Steel stockholders called the deal "ridiculous". Youngstown-area stockholders contacted James A. Campbell of Youngstown Sheet & Tube for advice, and Campbell reviewed Trumbull's finances in an informal meeting with the Trumbull board and several important stockholders.

On Monday, August 31, the Trumbull Steel board suspended Warner as president of Trumbull Steel, and set up an "executive committee" led by Campbell to operate the company. That same day, National City Co. and Union Trust Co. withheld the proceeds of the bond sale from Trumbull Steel, citing discrepancies in the Trumbull Steel's financial reports. (Note: This news seems to have first been reported by the Youngstown Vindicator on August 30, a day before most other reports.) The banks's refusal to distribute the proceeds of the bond sale was unprecedented, according to The New York Times. It "precipitated a great furor in finance circles," said Cyrus Eaton later. "I don't recall another instance in the history of finance In this country where a bond issue of that size had been recalled by an important house after it had been put out."

=== Warner's resignation ===
Warner as president and director of Trumbull Steel on September 1. In an emergency meeting, the Trumbull Steel board elected Philip Wick chairman and appointed him acting president. The board of directors also directed that certain items on the company balance sheet be reaudited.

On September 5, news that there might be large errors in Trumbull Steel's financial accounts, and that Warner might be held responsible for them, leaked in the press.

By September 8, the Youngstown Vindicator estimated that some 255,000 shares, or about a third of the common stock, had been sold, most of it dumped by Mahoning Valley investors. While on September 1 the press could report that control of Trumbull Steel was "in the hands of Youngstown men", by September 9 The Cincinnati Enquirer was saying ownership of the company had shifted away to Cleveland shareholders.

On September 11, in a tacit admission that funds were missing, Trumbull Steel began selling Jonathan Warner's assets.

=== The new audit and its fallout ===
On September 24, the new audit of Trumbull Steel was released. It showed that Trumbull Steel had inflated its earnings by $3.4 million (equivalent to $49,664,000 in 2025) over the past five years; and paid dividends out of capital. It has failed to disclose $17.5 million (equivalent to $241,016,000 in 2025) in bank loans and $4.1 million (equivalent to $59,889,000 in 2025) in other debt (primarily credit from dealers in raw materials such as coal and iron ore); and inflated the value of its assets by $6.18 million (equivalent to $90,271,000 in 2025).

Most damaging, a "material discrepancy" (embezzlement) of $3 million (equivalent to $44,405,000 in 2025) was found. (Note: Wick admitted in November 1925 that the exact amount embezzled could not be accurately determined, due to the extremely poor accounting methods the company had used.)

== Involvement of Cyrus Eaton ==
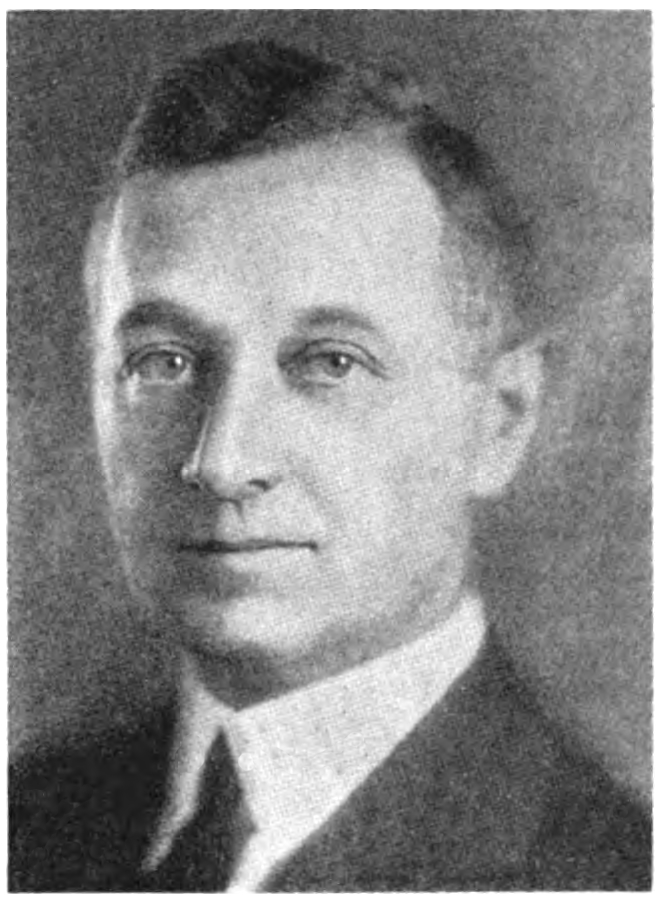
Cyrus S. Eaton in 1929.

=== Eaton's interest in steel ===
Cyrus Eaton joined the Cleveland investment banking firm of Otis & Company in April 1914. He was worth $80 million to $100 million by the late 1920s. At the urging of a friend, shipping magnate Harry Coulby, Eaton began an intensive study of the American steel industry in 1924. He became convinced that the industry was ripe for merger, and that a large, merged company would be highly profitable due to economies of scale. He began looking for a weak steel company to take over.

When Trumbull Steel's financial troubles began in July 1925, Eaton turned his attention to it. By October, he was owner of one of the largest blocs of Trumbull Steel common stock.

=== Eaton's offer to Trumbull Steel ===
Toward the end of September 1925, the Trumbull Steel executive committee was debating whether or not the company could survive. When the scandal broke in late August, the company's financial situation was so bad that almost everyone on the board thought the company would have to merge to survive. The company's executive committee calculated it would take $18 million to put the company back on its feet.

An unidentified mutual friend helped Eaton connect with Harrington. Eaton had also calculated that it would take about $18 million to save the steel company. If Trumbull Steel offered an $18 million bond sale, Eaton said he would underwrite the entire amount.

As part of the deal, underwriters of the bonds won the right to purchase up to 100,000 shares of common stock at $9 a share until January 1, 1928. (Note: On October 16, Trumbull Steel common was only selling for $8.50 a share.)

=== The bond offering ===
On October 16, the Trumbull Steel board of directors asked shareholders to approve two bond issues: A $13 million, 15-year, 6% first mortgage bond, and a $5 million, 10-year, 7% bond convertible into common shares. The proceeds of the two bond issues would be used to pay off the company's bank loans. Stockholders were also informed that investment and brokerage banks had already agreed to take all the bond offerings, with Otis & Co. leading a syndicate of banks taking up $13 million debenture.

With more than 90% of stockholders voting, 90% of preferred shareholders and 85% of common shareholders approved the two bond offerings on November 10. Both bond issues were heavily oversubscribed. The bond offering saved Trumbull Steel from receivership.

=== Eaton gains control ===
On December 16, 1925, Cyrus Eaton, automotive executive Joseph O. Eaton II, (Note: Joseph Eaton was president of Eaton Axle & Spring, and a partner in Otis & Co. He was no relation to Cyrus Eaton.) and banker and Cleveland-Cliffs Iron Co. director Edward B. Greene were elected to the Trumbull Steel board of directors.

The board then elected Cyrus Eaton to be its new chairman. The board, now dominated by Cleveland-based investors led by Eaton, (Note: Although the Wick family and its holding company, Wick & Co., still controlled a large number of shares, a controlling majority of shares were held by Cyrus Eaton; Cleveland industrialist and banker John Sherwin; and Eaton's investment company, Otis & Co.) appointed attorney John T. Harrington to be the new president of Trumbull Steel. A new executive committee, consisting of Cyrus Eaton, Philip Wick, and John Harrington, was also formed.

Eaton tightened his control over Trumbull Steel in February 1926, exercising the options that allowed him to buy Trumbull Steel stock at $9 a share at a time when the stock was trading at $13. By April 1926, Eaton and Otis & Co. held a majority of the stock of Trumbull Steel.

== 1926 under Eaton and Harrington ==
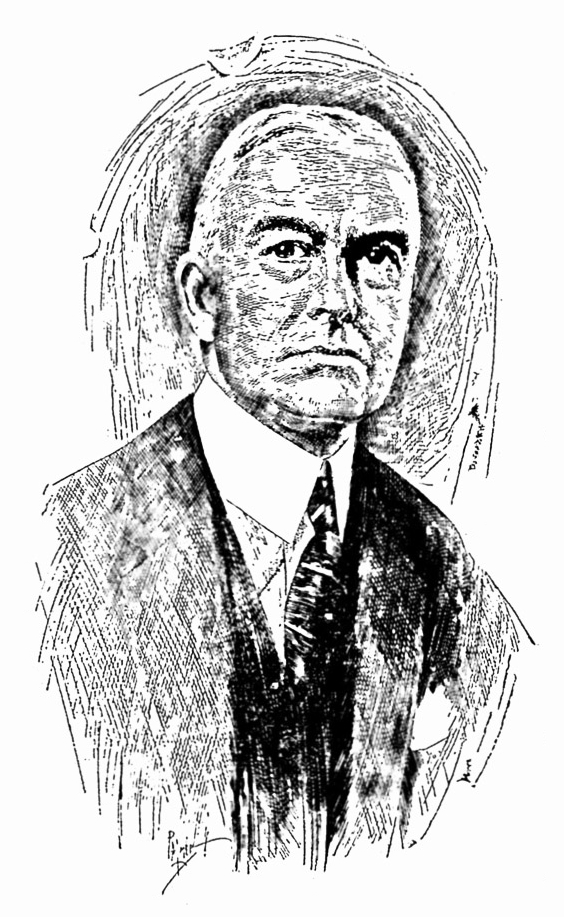
John T. Harrington in 1926.

Harrington proved to be an extremely active president. He set aside practically all his other responsibilities, and became personally involved in day to day at Trumbull Steel, which by now employed only 4,500 people. His law firm, Harrington, DeFord, Huxley & Smith (formerly King & McVey), had represented many steel and industrial interests in the Mahoning Valley, and as a senior partner Harrington had been deeply involved in the organization, financing, and personnel decisions of many steel companies. He was already serving as president of Pennsylvania and Ohio Power & Light. When asked by a newspaper why an attorney made a good steel company president, Harrington said a good president only needed excellent commercial and business instincts and an ability to keep an organization nimble and responsive.

=== Financial and physical plant improvements ===
Trumbull Steel began to improve financially in 1926. The company reported $553,520 (equivalent to $8,049,000 in 2025) in net earnings for the first quarter. Liberty Steel reported net earnings of $50,000 (equivalent to $727,000 in 2025), and Trumbull-Cliffs Furnace reported net earnings of $120,000 (equivalent to $1,745,000 in 2025). Trumbull Steel's cash position had also improved to $1.3 million (equivalent to $18,903,000 in 2025).

Trumbull Steel was now financially healthy enough to begin making improvements again. It installed new furnaces and a new cooling and ventilating system in early summer 1926, rebuilt six of its tinplate stands, and added new mechanical doublers in the tin house. It began widening the stands at its 16-inch hot rolling mill in October, made improvements in its cold rolling mill, and added 12 automatic tinning machines (allowing tinplate production to rise to 300 boxes a day from 70).

=== The new 36-inch mill ===
In mid October 1926, the board of directors authorized Harrington to proceed with a $1.5 million project (equivalent to $21,812,000 in 2025) to widen its 18-inch strip mill to 36 inches. This project was intended to boost production to 60,000 short tons (54,000 t) from 45,000 short tons (41,000 t) per month.

The alterations included automating the hot-rolled strip mill so that it could operate at high speed. The changes meant the company could roll steel strip anywhere from 2 to 12 inches (5.1 to 30.5 cm) wide and 1.32 to 3.16 inches (3.4 to 8.0 cm) thick at speeds ranging from 500 to 3,000 feet (150 to 910 m) per minute.

To provide that much steel that fast, Trumbull also added a new 36-inch (91 cm) wide rolling stand, three two-high roughing stands, three new heating furnaces, five two-high roughing stands, three edging stands, five four-high finishing stands, extensive roller tables, new cooling beds, and new coiling and shearing equipment. Half a million dollars alone was spent adding new pickling, annealing, and shipping facilities. (Note: Only $1 million was spent converting the mill. The rest of the money went for other improvements.) The new mill was completed in mid May, and began operation in September. It was the first high speed mill in the Mahoning Valley steel district and only the second high speed mill in the nation. The new high-speed mill reduced the cost of steel strip as much as $15 to $17 a ton, at a time when hot-rolled strip sold for about $4,200 a ton. (Note: Prices for steel strip were quoted in dollars per pound.) Such cost reductions were deeply troubling to many competing manufacturers of strip. Trumbull Steel patented the designs, layout, and improvements it used in building the new mill.

For the fiscal year ending December 31, 1926, Trumbull Steel had gross revenues of $35,525,386 (equivalent to $371,168,000 in 2025), and net earnings of $2,263,964 (equivalent to $32,921,000 in 2025). It had spent $3.4 million on repairs and $9.3 million on improvements. The company reported that the loss on inventory in 1925 had finally been determined, and that it was greater than the reported net earnings at the time.

== 1927 ==
Before the February 1927 board meeting, John T. Harrington privately expressed his desire to retire as president, but Eaton persuaded him to remain for one more year. The board approved another round of major expenditures at this meeting, agreeing to spend $1.225 million (equivalent to $18,245,000 in 2025) to build four more 100-ton open-hearth furnaces in addition to the eight it already had.

In mid February, the company reported that its net working capital had increased by $1 million to a total of $7,906,033 (equivalent to $117,751,000 in 2025). Shareholders received the news very favorably, and by the end of the month Trumbull Steel's preferred stock had hit an all-time high.

In April, however, the board declined to take the action necessary to carry out its February expansion plans. That was interpreted by the press as a sign that Trumbull Steel and Republic Iron & Steel were beginning to coordinate their production, and might merge in the near future.

== Merger with Republic Steel ==
The Roaring Twenties had created an under-capacity in steelmaking and an over-capacity in steel finishing. The solution was to either spend tens of millions of dollars expanding basic steel manufacturing, or for steel makers and finishers to merge and rationalize the supply chain.

=== Eaton's steps toward merger ===
In the summer of 1925, Cyrus Eaton convinced William G. Mather to join him in consolidating various Ohio steel companies into a larger company that could compete with U.S. Steel and Bethlehem Steel.

Eaton and Mather wanted control of Central Steel, and bought large amounts of Central Steel stock in the fall and early winter of 1925.

On April 12, 1926, Eaton acquired all the United Alloy Steel stock of Edward A. Langenbach for $6 million (equivalent to $87,247,000 in 2025). A week later, Cyrus Eaton, Joseph O. Eaton, and Philip Wick were elected to the board of directors of United Alloy Steel.

In April 1926, Otis & Co. formed a new investment company, Continental Shares, whose purpose was to acquire stock in various steel companies. Eaton used the company to further improve his stock holdings in United Alloy and move merger talks with Central Steel along. On July 21, the two companies reached an agreement and announced their merger. The new company's name was Central Alloy Steel.

The interlocking boards of directors of Otis & Co., Trumbull Steel, Central Alloy Steel, Cleveland-Cliffs, and Pickands Mather led to intense speculation that Trumbull Steel would be the next company to join the emerging Eaton group of steel companies, perhaps even as early as the fall of 1926.

Republic Iron & Steel had been in and out of financial trouble from 1923 to 1927. This made it a good target for Eaton. A Republic-Trumbull combination also made sense in terms of economic rationalization: Republic Iron & Steel primarily produced bars, pipe, and sheet steel, while Trumbull Steel largely made the strip steel and tin plate from which Republic's products were made. Trumbull Steel had more mill capacity than its blast furnace and open-hearth furnaces could provide for. Republic Steel, located just a few miles away, had excess blast furnace and open-hearth capacity. Each firm could spend millions of dollars building capacity, with the risk of creating oversupply, or merge and complement one another.

In October 1926, Eaton formed a private syndicate of wealthy investors with the purpose of acquiring of Republic Iron & Steel common stock. Eaton purchased Republic Iron & Steel stock so quietly that company president John A. Topping remained unaware of it until Eaton informed him.

Eaton resolved to force a merger. Eaton ordered Trumbull Steel president John T. Harrington to use $775,000 (equivalent to $11,543,000 in 2025) of the corporation's money to buy Republic stock. From February 28 to March 11, 1927, Trumbull Steel acquired 100,000 shares of Republic Iron & Steel common, more a third of all the Republic shares on the market. (Note: Republic Iron & Steel had 300,000 common shares on the market.) Stock purchases were placed so widely, with so many brokers, no one at Republic was aware that any large-scale buying was taking place.

On Monday, April 11, the Associated Press broke the news that Eaton had acquired a "substantial interest" in Republic Iron & Steel through open-market buying. The Boston Globe called it a "market coup". It was now clear Eaton had enough stock to control Republic.

At Republic's annual meeting on April 12, Cyrus S. Eaton, Edward B. Greene, and John S. Brookes Jr. were elected to Republic's board of directors. (Note: Brookes was the secretary of The Koppers Co., a firm which made coking ovens and was controlled by Andrew S. Mellon. Brookes was seen as Mellon's representative on the board of Republic Iron & Steel, and his election indicative of Mellon's support for Eaton.)

=== Pre-merger moves by Trumbull Steel ===
The Trumbull Steel board of directors met on April 14, 1927, and for the first time Cyrus Eaton was in attendance. Still on the table was the proposal that Trumbull spend $1.5 million (equivalent to $22,341,000 in 2025) to enlarge its open-hearth steelmaking capacity by 30%. The board once more declined to make a decision. Expansion would have indicated that Trumbull Steel intended to stay independent and compete with Republic Steel, so the board's inaction was widely interpreted as indicating a coming merger.

Two days later, Trumbull Steel announced it would make steel ingot purchases from Republic Iron & Steel.

Merger rumors became stronger. The Cleveland Press reported in mid April that at least some Trumbull Steel shareholders had been approached by Eaton to gauge their requirements for a merger. By May 1, The New York Times was saying that Youngstown Sheet & Tube, Central Alloy Steel, Trumbull Steel, and Otis Steel were said to be involved in the merger talks.

=== Trumbull and Republic merge ===
On Friday, November 25, the presidents of Trumbull Steel and Republic Iron & Steel announced that their boards of directors had approved a merger. Holders of Trumbull Steel preferred would get one and two-thirds shares of Republic preferred, while holders of Trumbull common would get a one-fifth share of Republic common. Shareholders of Republic Iron & Steel approved the merger on January 25, 1928, followed by Trumbull Steel's shareholders on February 16.

At an organizing meeting on April 18, Elmer T. McCleary, a vice president of Youngstown Sheet & Tube, was elected president of the merged company. Harry T. Gilbert of Sharon Steel Hoop was elected vice president, and John U. Anderson of Trumbull Steel was elected treasurer. McCleary, Gilbert, and John T. Harrington were elected to the board of directors. The assets of Trumbull Steel were formally acquired by Republic on April 27, and Trumbull Steel ceased to exist. The combined company had assets of $200 million, making it the fifth largest steel manufacturer in the United States.

== Aftermath ==
Eaton acquired Donner Steel in September 1929 and Central Alloy Steel purchased the Interstate Steel Company in October 1929.

In December 1929, the merger Eaton had been working on for five years came together as Central Alloy Steel, Donner Steel, and Republic Iron & Steel merged. Joining them was another Ohio steelmaker, the Bourne-Fuller Co. The merged company was called Republic Steel.

== Trumbull Steel subsidiaries ==
=== Fort Smith Spelter ===
In March 1916, Trumbull Steel incorporated a wholly-owned subsidiary, the Fort Smith Spelter Company, in Fort Smith, Arkansas, and capitalized it at $350,000 (equivalent to $7,143,000 in 2025). The company built a spelter plant, which smelted zinc ore into pure bricks for use in galvanizing steel. Formation of the company was prompted by the abnormally high demand for zinc caused by World War I. The new subsidiary spent $250,000 (equivalent to $5,102,000 in 2025) erecting the plant in Fort Smith. Work on the plant began on March 23 and was nearly complete by late June.

This was the first attempt by an American galvanized steel maker to control the source of and supply of its spelter.

Initially, the spelter covered four city blocks. It had 640 retort furnaces, was capable for producing 2,000 short tons (1,800 t) of spelter a month, and employed 250 men. The spelter plant was enlarged by 50% in December 1916, an expansion which covered two more city blocks. The Fort Smith Spelter company made $1 million worth of spelter in its first year of operation.

In May 1917, Trumbull Steel vice president D.W. Kerr resigned from the company and purchased the Fort Smith Spelter Co. from Trumbull Steel for an undisclosed amount.

=== Liberty Steel ===
In April 1917, Youngstown businessman Edward F. Clark incorporated a new steel company, Liberty Steel. He bought 600 acres (240 ha) next to Trumbull Steel, and began erecting a steel plant in June. The plant focused on tin plate, and had eight stands capable for producing 600,000 boxes a year. It employed more than 2,000 men.

Trumbull Steel purchased the company in March 1919, exchanging Liberty Steel common stock one-to-one with Trumbull Steel common. All of Liberty Steel's common stock was acquired. The cost of the acquisition was $2 million (equivalent to $27,708,000 in 2025), and created the largest tin plate manufacturer in the Mahoning Valley — and possibly the entire nation. Trumbull Steel immediately added four more sheet stands to the plant.

In April 1927, with Cyrus Eaton not-very-secretly planning to merge Trumbull Steel with Republic Iron & Steel, Trumbull Steel proposed dissolving Liberty Steel. This would end Liberty's corporate existence and turn all Liberty assets over to Trumbull. To do so, Trumbull Steel offered Liberty Steel preferred stockholders a one-to-one exchange with Trumbull Steel preferred. If the offer was accepted, Trumbull Steel would then redeem all of Liberty Steel's $150,000 in 6% bonds. There were 991,600 shares of Liberty Steel preferred on the market, unanimous consent was needed for the deal to go through. By May 3, only 80% of Liberty preferred shareholders had agreed to the deal, and the offer was considered a failure. To obtain the remaining Liberty preferred, Trumbull Steel issued 10,000 new shares of Trumbull 7% preferred to the holdouts in September 1927. This enriched offer convinced the remaining Liberty shareholders to agree to the dissolution.

=== Coal and iron ore ===
In September 1917, Trumbull Steel purchased a one-half interest in the Pitt Gas Coal Co., which owned coal mines in Washington County, Pennsylvania. The company produced 800 short tons (730 t) a day on this land. (Note: This land was near Brownsville, Pennsylvania.)

In April 1918, Trumbull Steel incorporated the Trumbull Coal Company. It owned half the company, while the Pitt Gas Coal Co. owned the other half. The company purchased what became the Trumbull Mine, which was located on 600 acres (240 ha) of coal-bearing land in Greene County near Clarksville, Pennsylvania. (Note: It later became known as the William Pitt Mine.) The mine produced about 20,000 short tons (18,000 t) per month, and had estimated reserves of 6,000,000 short tons (5,400,000 t).

In 1919, Cleveland-Cliffs Iron formed an independent company, the Mesaba Cliffs Iron Mining Co. Trumbull Steel invested in the new firm by purchasing one-fourth of its stock. Other companies such as Otis Steel, Pittsburgh Steel, and The Whitaker-Glessner Co. also had an interest in Mesaba Cliffs, but Cleveland-Cliffs retained a controlling interest in the company. The mining firm operated four iron ore mines on the Mesabi Range in Minnesota: The Bingham, Boeing (formerly the Bourne), Hill-Trumbull, and North Star. These mines had a combined 13,000,000 short tons (12,000,000 t) in iron ore reserves, with Trumbull Steel receiving one-fourth of all ore mined.

== Trumbull-Cliffs Furnace Company ==
Trumbull Steel wanted to secure a regular supply of pig iron for its open-hearth furnaces. The obvious solution was to build a blast furnace adjacent to the steel plant, but Trumbull Steel lacked the financial capacity to build it and had no staff knowledgeable in the operation of a blast furnace.

On April 20, 1920, Trumbull Steel and Cleveland-Cliffs Iron Co. entered into a contract build a blast furnace at Warren, Ohio. The two firms jointly incorporated the Trumbull-Cliffs Furnace Company on May 6, 1920. Each parent company spent $500,000 to purchase Trumbull-Cliffs Furnace common stock, and Cleveland-Cliffs spent $4 million to purchase all the preferred stock.

The Trumbull-Cliffs Furnace Co. purchased land on the Mahoning River directly opposite the Trumbull Cliffs steel plant on which it erected a 600-short-ton (540 t) blast furnace. That made it 20% larger than the average blast furnace, the largest blast furnace in the Mahoning Valley at the time, and the largest blast furnace in the nation in terms of capacity.

The blast furnace was completed June 14, 1921. That was a construction time record for a furnace that large. It was finally blown in on January 15, 1922.

The Trumbull-Cliffs Furnace also built a $3 million (equivalent to $44,071,000 in 2025) coking factory. The plant was first charged on July 7, 1924, and produced various industrial gases, tar, benzole, and ammonium sulfate.

The period of joint ownership of Trumbull-Cliffs Furnace came in 1930. By this time, Republic Steel owned Trumbull Steel. On December 31, 1929, Republic agreed to give Cleveland-Cliffs Iron 22,340 of its common shares in exchange for Cleveland Cliffs's interest in the blast furnace company.

== Bibliography ==
- American Iron and Steel Institute (1926). Directory of the Iron and Steel Works of the United States and Canada. Twentieth edition. New York: American Iron and Steel Institute. OCLC 7685220.
- Blackstone, Jay (May–June 2020). "The Extraordinary Capitalist John T. Harrington" (PDF). LegalLines. pp. 8–12.
- "Blast Furnace to Be Built by Cleveland-Cliffs and Trumbull Steel interests". The Iron Trade Review. May 13, 1920. pp. 1414–1415.
- Camp, J.M.; Francis, C.B. (1925). The Making, Shaping and Treating of Steel. 4th ed. Pittsburgh: Carnegie Steel Company. OCLC 1331445052.
- "Cleveland Cliffs Files Answer". Finance & Industry. February 25, 1927. pp. 9–12, 21.
- Gleisser, Marcus (2005). The World of Cyrus Eaton. Kent, Ohio: Kent State University Press. ISBN 9780873388399.
- "New 600-Ton Blast Furnace Plant". Blast Furnace & Steel Plant. October 1921. pp. 588–597. hdl:2027/mdp.39015080085395.
- "New Trumbull-Cliffs 600-Ton Blast Furnace". The Iron Age. September 15, 1921. pp. 673–679.
- "Plant for Manufacturing Sheets and Tin Plate". The Iron Trade Review. September 11, 1913. pp. 446–449.
- Poor's Manual. 1927 Industrial Section. New York: Poor's Publishing Co. 1927. OCLC 2436727.
- Securities and Exchange Commission (1942). "Investment Trusts and Investment Companies": Report of the Securities and Exchange Commission Pursuant to Section 30 of the Public Utility Holding Company Act of 1935. Part Four: Control and Influence Over Industry and Economic Significance of Investment Companies. Washington, D.C.: U.S. Government Printing Office.
- "The Strip Mills of Trumbull Steel Co". The Iron Age. February 20, 1919. pp. 475–479.
- Subcommittee of the Committee on Education and Labor (1939). Violations of Free Speech and the Rights of Labor. Part 23: "Little Steel": The Republic Steel Corporation. U.S. Senate. 75th Cong., 3rd sess. Washington, D.C.: Government Printing Office.
- Temporary National Economic Committee (1940). Investigation of Concentration of Economic Power. Hearings Before the Temporary National Economic Committee. Part 18: Iron and Steel Industry: Iron Ore. 76th Cong., 2d sess. Washington, D.C.: U.S. Government Printing Office.
- "The Trumbull Steel and Tin Plate Mills". The Iron Age. September 11, 1913. pp. 556–558.
- Warren, Kenneth (2020). A Century of American Steel: The Strip Mill and the Transformation of an Industry. Lanham, Md.: Lexington Books. ISBN 9781498576994.
