= Ironworks =

Building or site where iron is smelted

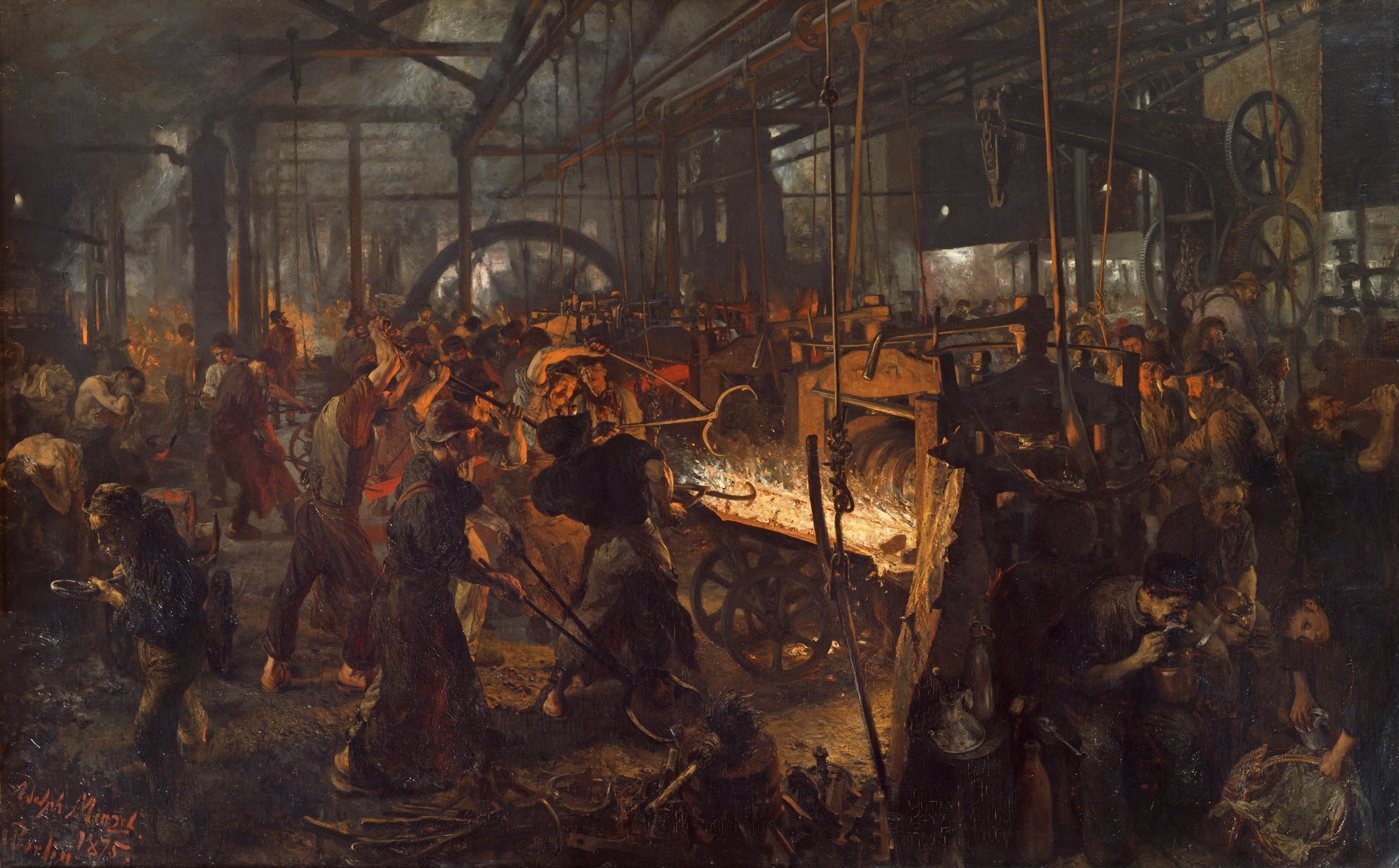
The Iron Rolling Mill (Eisenwalzwerk), 1870s, by Adolph Menzel.

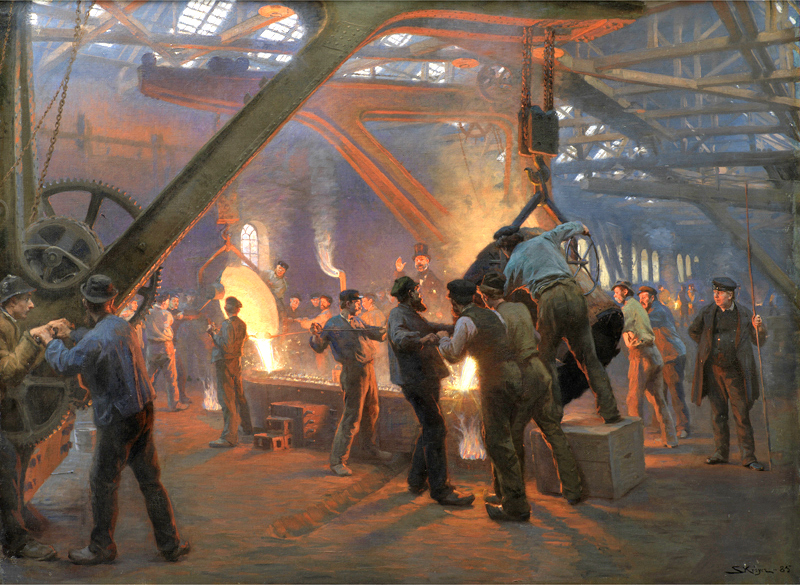
Casting at an iron foundry: From Fra Burmeister og Wain's Iron Foundry, 1885 by Peder Severin Krøyer

An ironworks or iron works is an industrial plant where iron is smelted and where heavy iron and steel products are made. The term is both singular and plural, i.e. the singular of ironworks is ironworks.

Ironworks succeeded bloomeries when blast furnaces replaced former methods. An integrated ironworks in the 19th century usually included one or more blast furnaces and a number of puddling furnaces or a foundry with or without other kinds of ironworks. After the invention of the Bessemer process, converters became widespread, and the appellation steelworks replaced ironworks.

The industrial process carried on ironworks is usually described as ferrous metallurgy, but the term siderurgy is also occasionally used. This is derived from the Greek words sideros - iron and ergon or ergos - work. This is an unusual term in English, and typically appears as the anglicisation of a term used in French, Spanish, and other Romance languages.

Historically, it is common that a community was built around the ironworks where the people living there were dependent on the ironworks to provide jobs and housing. As the ironworks closed down (or was industrialised) these villages quite often went into decline and experienced negative economic growth.

== Varieties of ironworks ==
=== Primary ironmaking ===
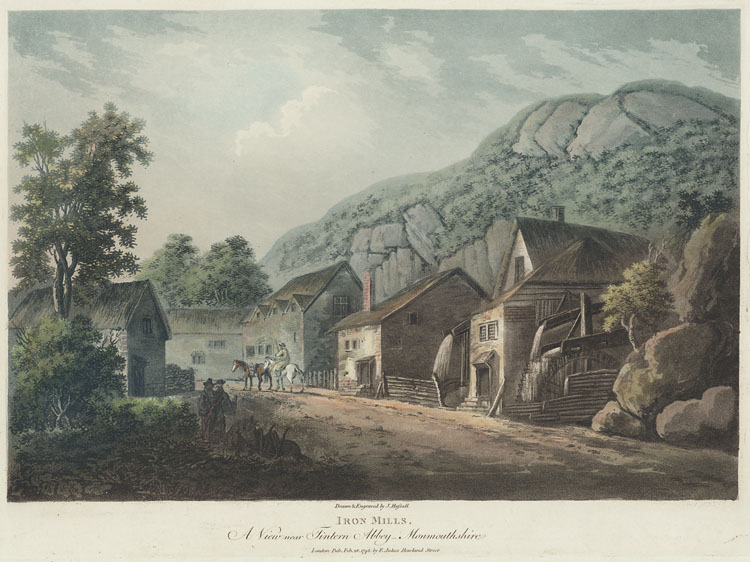
A South Wales iron mill in 1798

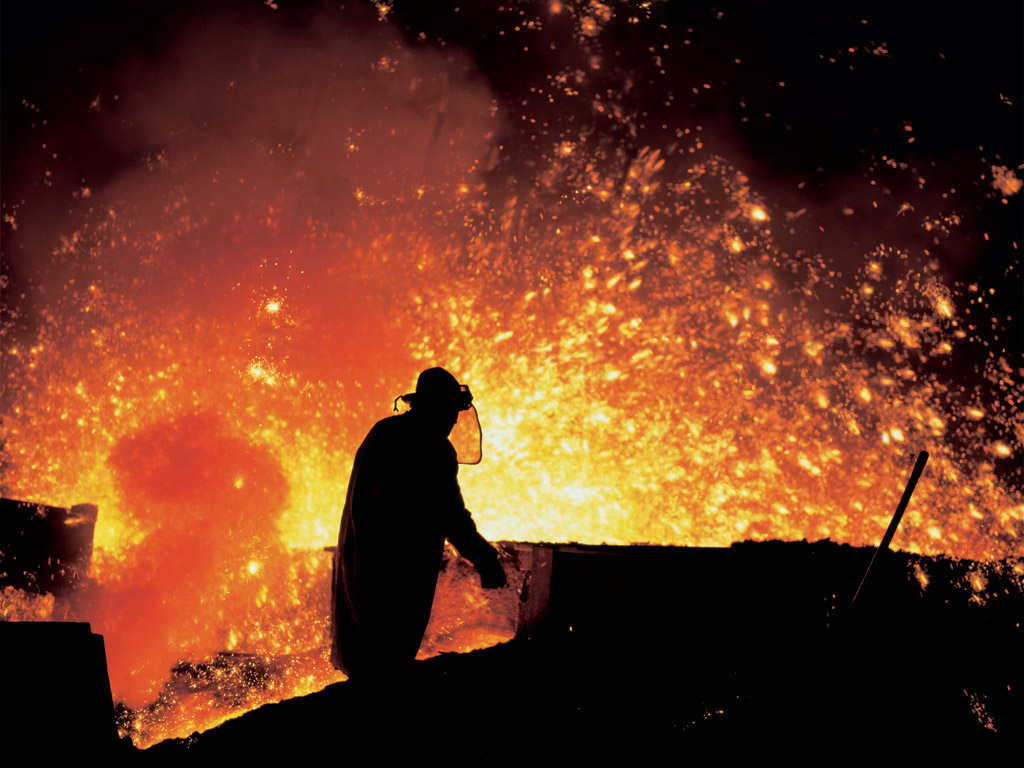
Blast furnaces of Třinec Iron and Steel Works.

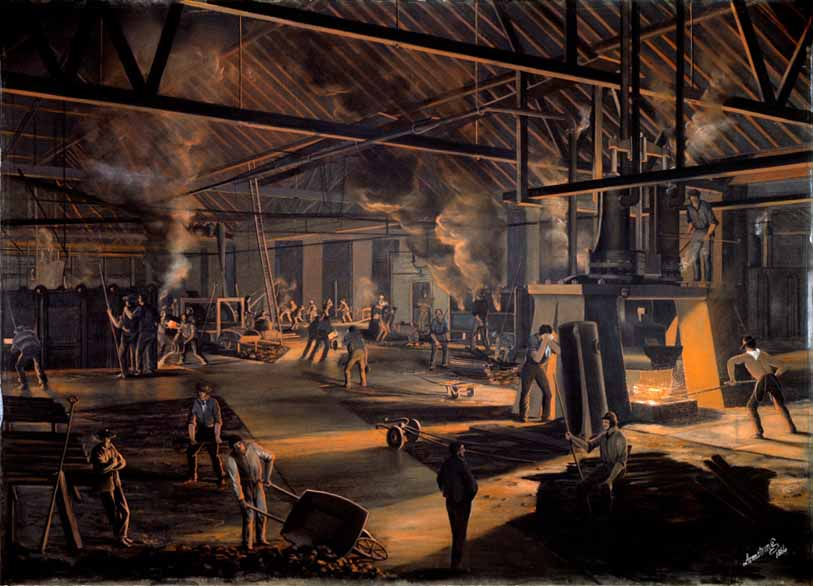
Toronto rolling mills

Ironworks is used as an omnibus term covering works undertaking one or more iron-producing processes. Such processes or species of ironworks where they were undertaken include the following:

- Blast furnaces — which made pig iron (or sometimes finished cast iron goods) from iron ore;
- Bloomeries — where bar iron was produced from iron ore by direct reduction;
- Electrolytic smelting — Employs a chromium/iron anode that can survive a 2,850 °F (1,570 °C) to produce decarbonized iron and 2/3 of a ton of industrial-quality oxygen per ton of iron. A thin film of metal oxide forms on the anode in the intense heat. The oxide forms a protective layer that prevents excess consumption of the base metal.
- Finery forges — which fined pig iron to produce bar iron, using charcoal as fuel in a finery (hearth) and coal or charcoal in a chafery (hearth);
- Foundries — where pig iron was remelted in an air furnace or in a foundry cupola to produce cast iron goods;
- Potting and stamping forges with melting fineries using the first process in which bar iron was made from pig iron with mineral coal or coke, without the use of charcoal;
- Puddling furnaces — a later process for the same purpose, again with coke as fuel. It was usually necessary for there to be a preliminary refining process in a coke refinery (also called running out furnace). After puddling, the puddled ball needed shingling and then to be drawn out into bar iron in a rolling mill.

=== Modern steelmaking ===
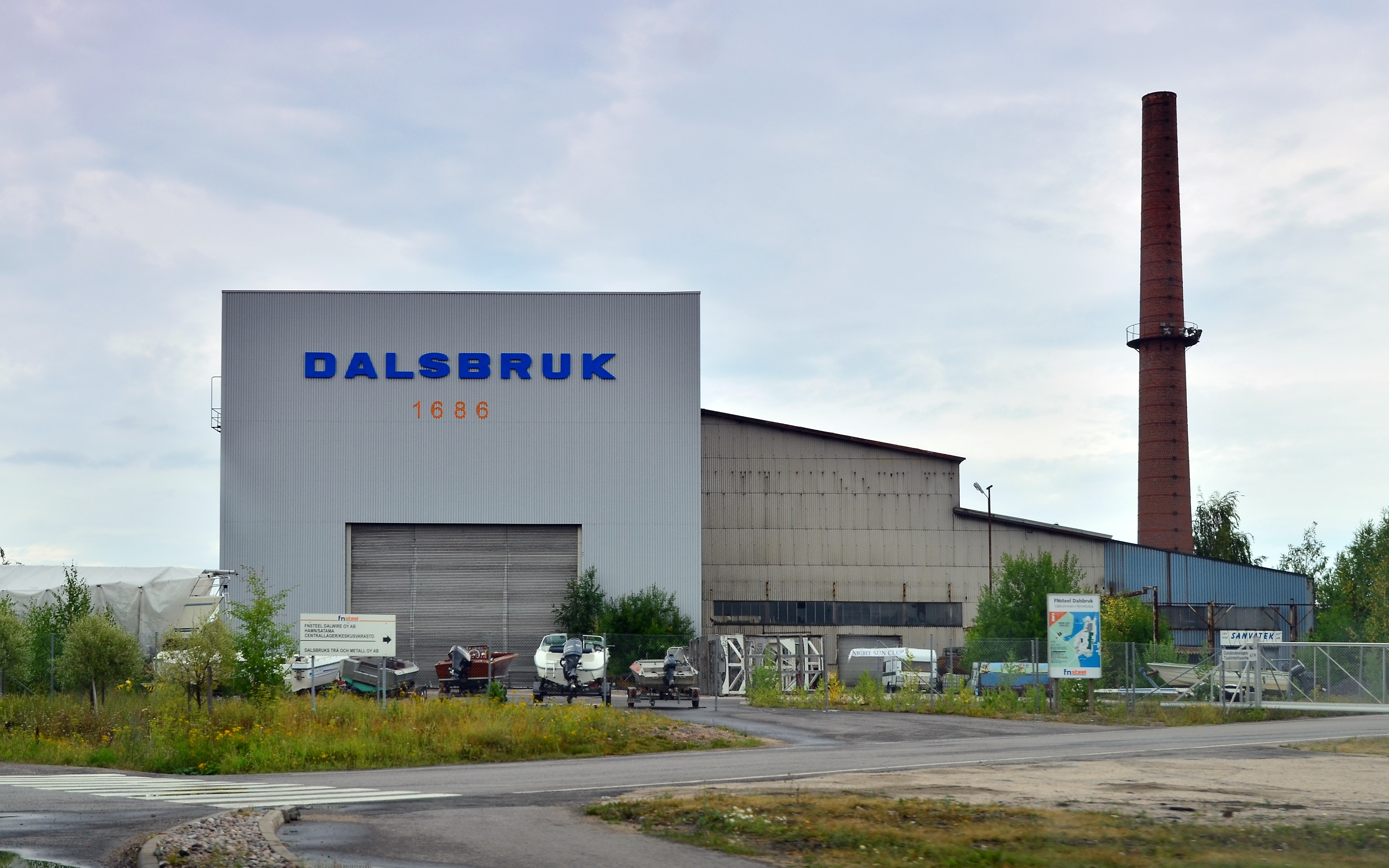
The ironworks of Dalsbruk in Kimitoön, Finland

From the 1850s, pig iron might be partly decarburised to produce mild steel using one of the following:

- The Bessemer process in a Bessemer converter, improved by the Gilchrist–Thomas process;
- The Siemens-Martin process in an Open hearth furnace;
- Electric arc furnace, introduced in 1907;
- Basic oxygen steelmaking, introduced in 1952.

The mills operating converters of any type are better called steelworks, ironworks referring to former processes, like puddling.

=== Further processing ===
After bar iron had been produced in a finery forge or in the forge train of a rolling mill, it might undergo further processes in one of the following:

- A slitting mill - which cut a flat bar into rod iron suitable for making into nails.
- A tinplate works - where rolling mills made sheets of iron (later of steel), which were coated with tin.
- A plating forge with a tilt hammer, a lighter hammer with a rapid stroke rate, enabling the production of thinner iron, suitable for the manufacture of knives, other cutlery, and so on.
- A cementation furnace might be used to convert the bar iron (if it was pure enough) into blister steel by the cementation process, either as an end in itself or as the raw material for crucible steel.

=== Manufacture ===
Most of these processes did not produce finished goods. Further processes were often manual, including

- Manufacturing by blacksmiths or more specialist kind of smith.
- It might be used in shipbuilding.

In the context of the iron industry, the term manufacture is best reserved for this final stage.

== Notable ironworks ==
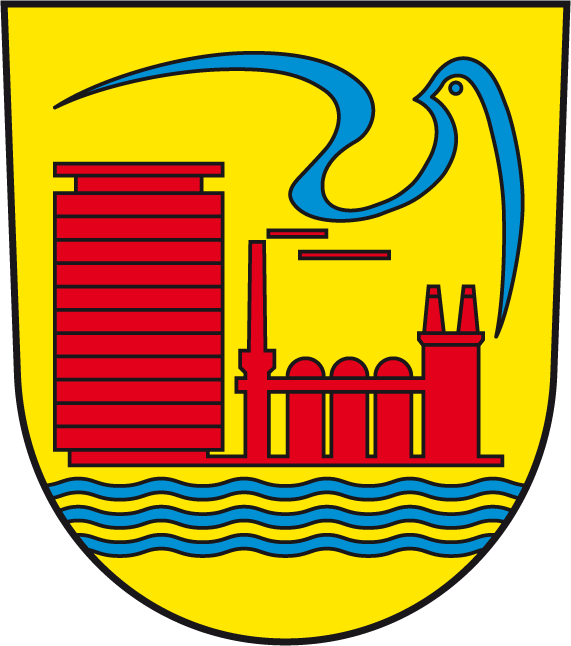
Coat of arms of Eisenhüttenstadt ("city of ironworks"), Germany

The notable ironworks of the world are described here by country. See above for the largest producers and the notable ironworks in the alphabetical order.

=== Africa ===
==== South Africa ====
- Cape Town Iron and Steel Works in Kuilsrivier, Western Cape
- Mittal Steel South Africa
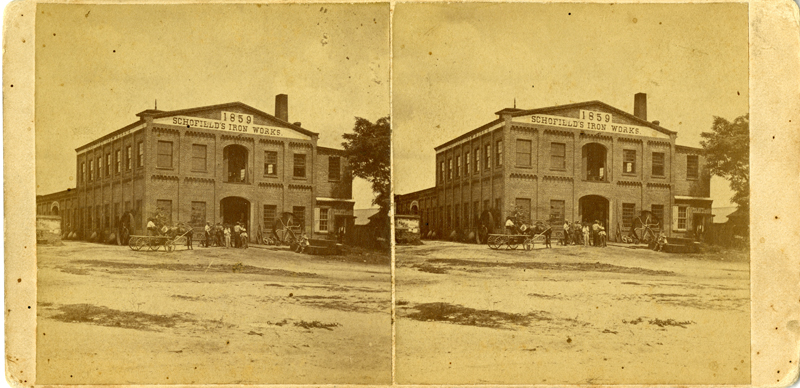
  Schofield's Iron Works in Macon, Georgia, circa 1877.

=== Americas ===
==== United States ====
- American Iron Works in Hyattsville, Maryland
- Bath Iron Works in Maine
- Burden Iron Works in Troy, New York
- Cambria Iron Company in Johnstown, Pennsylvania
- Falling Creek Ironworks, Virginia.
- Saugus Iron Works in Saugus, Massachusetts
- Toledo Iron Works in Miami, Florida
- Tredegar Iron Works at Richmond, Virginia
- U.S. Steel
  - Fairfield Works, near Birmingham, Alabama
  - Gary Works, near Chicago, Illinois
  - Granite City Works, near St. Louis, Missouri
  - Great Lakes Works, near Detroit, Michigan
  - Mon Valley Works (Homestead Steel Works, etc.), near Pittsburgh, Pennsylvania
- Vulcan Iron Works in Pennsylvania and other places

=== Asia ===
==== China ====
- Anben Group, Anshan & Benxi, Liaoning
- China Baowu Steel Group, in various locations, for example:
  - Baosteel, Shanghai
  - WISCO, Wuhan, Hebei
  - Meishan Iron & Steel, Nanjing, Jiangsu
  - Zhanjiang Iron & Steel, Zhanjiang, Guangdong
- Baotou Steel, Baotou, Inner Mongolia
- Shougang Group, Beijing

==== India ====
- Five major steel works of Steel Authority of India, Ltd (SAIL)
- Kalinganagar Works of Tata Steel in Kalinganagar, Odisha
- Vijayanagar Works of JSW Steel in Bellary, Karnataka

==== Japan ====
The largest Japanese steel companies' main works are as follows:

- JFE Steel
  - Chiba Works (from former Kawasaki Steel), Chiba, Chiba, of JFE Eastern Works
  - Keihin Works (from former NKK), Kawasaki, Kanagawa, of JFE Eastern Works
  - Fukuyama Works (from former NKK), Fukuyama, Hiroshima, of JFE Western Works
  - Kurashiki Works (from former Kawasaki Steel), Kurashiki, Okayama, of JFE Western Works
- Kobe Steel
  - Kakogawa Steel Works, Kakogawa, Hyogo
- Nippon Steel & Sumitomo Metal
  - Hirohata Works (広畑製鐵所, of former Nippon Steel), Himeji, Hyogo
  - Kimitsu Steel Works, of former Nippon Steel), Kimitsu, Chiba
  - Nagoya Works (名古屋製鐵所, of former Nippon Steel), Tokai, Aichi (near Nagoya)
  - Ōita Works (大分製鐵所, of former Nippon Steel), Ōita, Ōita
  - Yahata Steel Works (of former Nippon Steel), Kimitsu, Chiba
  - Kashima Works (鹿島製鐵所, of former Sumitomo Metal), Kashima, Ibaraki
  - Wakayama Works (和歌山製鐵所, of former Sumitomo Metal), Wakayama, Wakayama

==== Korea ====
- POSCO
  - Gwangyang Steelworks, south coast
  - Pohang Steelworks, east coast
- Hyundai Steel
  - Incheon Steelworks, west coast

==== Vietnam ====
- Formosa Ha Tinh Steel of Formosa Plastics Group in Ha Tinh Province

=== Europe ===
==== Czech Republic ====
- Třinec Iron and Steel Works in Třinec, Czech Republic

==== Germany ====
- Völklingen Ironworks Heritage Site

==== Great Britain ====
- Blaenavon Ironworks Heritage Site. Blaenavon (Blaenafon) South Wales
- Brecon Ironworks
- Coalbrookdale Ironworks, Coalbrookdale
- Cyfarthfa Ironworks at Merthyr Tydfil, Glamorgan, South Wales
- Dowlais Ironworks also at Merthyr Tydfil
- Millwall Ironworks, a shipbuilding firm on the Isle of Dogs, on the River Thames, London, England
- Thames Ironworks and Shipbuilding Co. Ltd, a shipbuilding firm at Leamouth on the River Thames, England
- Vulcan Iron Works at Bradford and other places

==== Italy ====
- Cogne acciai speciali, Aosta (example of a mountain steel meel)
- Ferreira di Servola, Trieste (operating since 1896)
- Acciaieria di Piombino
- Società Italiana Acciaierie Cornigliano di Cornigliano, Genova
- Acciai speciali Termi, now ThyssenKrupp Terni
- Acciaieria di Bagnoli, Napoli
- Acciaieria di Taranto (biggest Integrated steel mill in Europe)

==== Sweden ====
- Lummelunda Järnbruk
- Österbybruk
- Engelsberg Ironworks, Ängelsberg, Västmanland County
- Storbrohyttan Gjuteri
- Pershyttan
- Galtström Ironworks
- Forsbacka Ironworks km
- Kengis Forge
- Trångfors Forge
- Motjärnshyttan
- Gysinge Ironworks

==== Russia ====
- Chelyabinsk Tube Rolling Plant, Chelyabinsk, Chelyabinsk Oblast
- Magnitogorsk Iron and Steel Works, Magnitogorsk, Chelyabinsk Oblast
- Nizhny Tagil Iron and Steel Works, Nizhny Tagil, Sverdlovsk Oblast
- Novokuznetsk Iron and Steel Plant (of TMK), Novokuznetsk, Kemerovo Oblast
- Novolipetsk Steel, Lipetsk, Lipetsk Oblast
- Severstal, Cherepovets, Vologda Oblast
- Ural Steel (of Metalloinvest), Novotroitsk, Orenburg Oblast
- Volzhsky Pipe Plant (of OAO TMK), Volzhsky, Volgograd Oblast

==== Spain ====
- Altos Hornos de Vizcaya in Bilbao
- Arcelor facilities in Avilés and Gijón, formerly Ensidesa

=== Historical ===
- Kindiba, in Burkina Faso. Ancient iron extraction site consisting of mines and three clay built furnaces.
- Darkhill Ironworks, in the Forest of Dean, England. Experimental ironworks established in 1818 and designated an 'Industrial Archaeological Site of International Importance'
- Royal Ironworks of St John, Ipanema, in São Paulo state, Brazil
