= Baogang =

Baogang may refer to:

- Baosteel Group ("Baogang" is the pinyin of the Chinese short name)
  - Baoshan Iron & Steel Co., Ltd., a subsidiary of Baosteel Group ("Baogang" is the pinyin of the Chinese short name)
- Baotou Steel ("Baogang" is the pinyin of the Chinese short name)
- Baogang, Guangzhou, an area in Guangzhou city

== See also ==
- Baogang Tailings Dam, a tailings dam owned by Baotou Steel
- Baogang Avenue, or Baogang Dadao, a major road in Guangzhou city
- Baogang Dadao station, a metro station in Guangzhou city
