= Baoshan Iron & Steel Co., Ltd. =

Chinese steel maker

- logo (left) and bilingual company name (right)
- Trade name: Baosteel
- Company type: Public
- Traded as: SSE: 600019; CSI A50
- ISIN: CNE0000015R4
- Industry: Metallurgy
- Founded: 3 February 2000
- Founder: Baosteel Group
- Headquarters: Shanghai, China
- Products: Steel
- Revenue: ▼CN¥292 billion (2019)
- Net income: ▼CN¥12 billion (2019)
- Total assets: ▲CN¥340 billion (2019)
- Total equity: ▲CN¥178 billion (2019)
Owner
Baowu	(61.93% directly and indirectly)
- Number of employees: 52,323 (2019)
Subsidiaries
Wuhan Iron and Steel Co. Ltd.	(100%)
Meishan Iron & Steel Co., Ltd.	(77.0%)
Zhanjiang Iron & Steel Co., Ltd.	(90.0%)
Baosight Software	(50.8%)

Chinese name
- Simplified Chinese: 宝山钢铁股份有限公司
- Traditional Chinese: 寶山鋼鐵股份有限公司
- Literal meaning: Baoshan Steel and Iron Company Limited by Shares
Transcriptions
Standard Mandarin
- Hanyu Pinyin: Bǎoshān gāngtiě gǔfèn yǒuxiàn gōngsī

stock alias
- Simplified Chinese: 宝钢股份
- Traditional Chinese: 寶鋼股份
- Literal meaning: Baosteel Shares
Transcriptions
Standard Mandarin
- Hanyu Pinyin: Bǎogāng gǔfèn

short name (shared with parent company)
- Simplified Chinese: 宝山钢铁
- Traditional Chinese: 寶山鋼鐵
- Literal meaning: Baoshan Steel and Iron
Transcriptions
Standard Mandarin
- Hanyu Pinyin: Bǎoshān gāngtiě

second short name (shared with parent company)
- Simplified Chinese: 宝钢
- Traditional Chinese: 寶鋼
- Literal meaning: Baosteel
Transcriptions
Standard Mandarin
- Hanyu Pinyin: Bǎogāng
- Footnotes / references in consolidated financial statements; excluding minority interest from equity and profit figures

Baoshan Iron & Steel Co., Ltd., also known as Baoshan Iron & Steel and Baosteel, is a maker of steel based in Shanghai, China, and a subsidiary of state-owned China Baowu Steel Group (formerly Baosteel Group). It is listed on the Shanghai Stock Exchange.

== History ==
In 2000, the Baosteel Group split, creating the new Baoshan Iron & Steel Co., Ltd., which is listed on the Shanghai Stock Exchange since 12 December 2000. It was the largest initial public offering in Mainland China up to that time, raising CNY 7.7 billion despite being limited to domestic investors. It was rumoured that the company has planned to list in the Stock Exchange of Hong Kong in the same year. (and again in 2007) However, they were never materialized. Baoshan Iron & Steel's IPO record was broken by fellow government controlling listed company Sinopec in 2001. Nevertheless, Baoshan Iron & Steel also re-capitalize a few times to increase its share capital and market capitalization. For example, right after the IPO the share capital was CNY 12,512 million, as of 31 December 2019, it was CNY 22,274,460,375.

The major assets of the listed company at that time was the steel plant located in Shanghai.

However, even until today, not all of the assets of China Baowu Steel Group were injected into the listed company, for example steel plants that incorporated as Maanshan Iron & Steel Shaoguan Iron and Steel and Xinjiang Ba Yi Iron and Steel. Some of the assets were injected into another listed company Baosight Software in 2001. In 2004 Baoshan Iron & Steel Co., Ltd. acquired Baosight Software from the parent company. In the same year the listed company also attempted to acquire other assets from the parent, such as Meishan Iron & Steel, as well as the "special steel" (Chinese: 特殊鋼) production line of Shanghai Fifth Steel Plant. At that time, another unlisted sister company which has major connected transactions with the listed company, was Shanghai Baosteel International Economic & Trade Co. Ltd. (Chinese: 上海宝钢国际经济贸易有限公司; "Baosteel International" (Chinese: 宝钢国际) in short). Baosteel International became a wholly owned subsidiary of the listed company in 2005. A redistribution of the businesses of Baosteel International, to sister division and company took place in 2006.

In 2016, Baoshan Iron & Steel Co., Ltd. merged with Wuhan Iron and Steel Company Limited in an all-share deal.

== Subsidiaries ==
Baoshan Iron & Steel owned 4 major steel plants that located in Shanghai, Nanjing (in Meishan Iron Mine), Zhanjiang and Wuhan. The latter three were incorporated as a limited companies. Baoshan Iron & Steel also owned another listed company Baosight Software (SSE:600845) as well as other subsidiaries and joint ventures.

=== Meishan Iron & Steel ===
In 2004, Baoshan Iron & Steel acquired Meishan Iron & Steel Co., Ltd. Despite located in Nanjing, Jiangsu Province, the steel plant was founded by Shanghai municipal government and merged with Baosteel Group in 1998.

In 2019, it was announced that the steel plant of Meishan Iron & Steel, would relocate to Yancheng, Jiangsu Province in the 2020s.

=== Zhanjiang Iron & Steel ===
In October 2012, Baosteel acquired the controlling stake in Zhanjiang Iron & Steel Co., Ltd. from the State-owned Assets Supervision and Administration Commission (SASAC) of the Guangzhou Municipal People's Government. After the capital increase as well as the withdrew of Guangzhou SASAC, the listed company owned 90% stake of Zhanjiang Iron & Steel.

The first phase of the steel plant that owned by Zhanjiang Iron & Steel, is completed in 2016.

=== Wuhan Iron & Steel ===
On 21–22 September 2016, a merger between Baosteel Group and Wuhan Iron and Steel Group (WISCO) was announced. Baoshan Iron & Steel would take over the listed counterpart from Wuhan Iron and Steel Group in an all-share deal, while all the rights of Wuhan Iron and Steel Group would be transferred to Baosteel Group, as both corporations were supervised by the Central Government's SASAC.

Unlike Baosteel, WISCO has a longer history which could be traced back to 1955. It was once considered as the top 3 steel plants of China, along with Ansteel Group and Baotou Steel. Before the merger, if counting both listed and unlisted portions of WISCO, it was the sixth largest steel company in China and 11th in the world as of 2015, according to World Steel Association and China Iron and Steel Association.

== Equity investments ==
In 2002, Baosteel invested CNY 8 billion in the third pipeline of the West–East Gas Pipeline, acquiring a 12.8% stake (the pipe was incorporated as a limited company called Chinese: 中石油西北联合管道有限公司). In December 2015, a new company, PetroChina Pipelines (Chinese: 中石油管道有限公司), was formed to manage all three of the west–east pipelines, and existing share capital of the three management companies were converted into the share capital of the new company, giving Baosteel an overall 3.25% stake.

== Shareholders ==
Since foundation, Baosteel Group (now called China Baowu Steel Group after a merger) is the controlling shareholder of the listed company. In turn it is owned by the Chinese Central Government. However, the ownership ratio changed from time to time.

In mid-2016, Baosteel Group and China National Petroleum Corporation, both overseen by the State-owned Assets Supervision and Administration Commission, formed a cross ownership arrangement for their listed subsidiaries. After the deal, Baosteel Group held a 0.34% stake in PetroChina, while China National Petroleum Corp. received a 4.86% stake in Baoshan Iron and Steel.

In December 2019, Baowu transferred a further 2.19% stake of the listed company to Beijing local government-owned Shougang Group. Immediately after the deal, Baowu's stake on the listed company decreased from 64.12% to 61.93%.

== Markets ==
Baoshan Iron & Steel Co., Ltd. is a constituent of the CSI 300 pan-exchanges index. As of May 2020, it was also part of the subset, the CSI 100 Index.

The listed company was a constituent of the SSE 50 Index, the blue chip index of the Shanghai exchange. The shares was removed from the index in 2013 and re-instated in 2017. The company was removed from the index in December 2019. As of May 2020, the company is still a constituent of SSE 180 Index.

The company is ranked 323rd in 2020 edition of Forbes Global 2000.
