= List of power stations in Jordan =

The following is a list of fossil-fuel power stations in Jordan.

All power plants are connected to the Arab Gas Pipeline (except Risha), and receive natural gas by purchasing it from the Jordanian National Electric Power Company (NEPCO).

One of the country's power plants operates on locally mined oil shale, the 470 MW Attarat Power Plant, the second largest of its kind in the world.

== Overview ==
Overview of power plants in Jordan

== Natural gas ==
Name	Company	Location	Technology	Capacity (MW)	Commissioned	Notes
Aqaba Thermal Power Plant	Central Electricity Generating Company of Jordan (CEGCO)	Aqaba	Conventional Steam turbine with tri-fuel capability	390	1986	
Rehab Gas Turbine Power Station	CEGCO	Mafraq	CCGT	270	Unknown	
Risha Gas Power Station	CEGCO	Risha	Simple cycle	60	1989	Uses natural gas from Risha field, unconnected to Arab Gas Pipeline
Samra Electric Power Plant	Samra Electric Power Company (SEPGCO)	Zarqa	Combined cycle gas turbine (CCGT)	1341	2005	
Nebras Power Plant IPP1	Nebras Power Jordan (formerly AES Jordan PSC)	Amman	(CCGT)	381	2009	Same site as IPP4.
Qatrana Power Plant IPP2	Al-Qatrana Power Generation Company (QEPCO)	Qatraneh	(CCGT)	450	2012	
Amman Asia Power Plant IPP3	Amman Asia Electric Power Co. (AAEPC) and KEPCO	Amman	Tri-fuel	573	2012	World's largest tri-fuel power plant when it was inaugurated.
Nebras Power Plant IPP4	Nebras Power Jordan (formerly AES Jordan PSC)	Amman	Tri-fuel	241	2014	Same site as IPP1.
Zarqa Thermal Power Station	ACWA Power	Zarqa	(CCGT)	485	2019	

== Oil shale ==
Name	Company	Location	Technology	Capacity (MW)	Commissioned	Notes
Attarat Power Plant	Attarat Power Company (APCO)	Attarat	Oil shale	470	2022	World's second largest oil-shale power plant.

== See also ==
- Energy in Jordan
