= Magang =

Magang may refer to:

- Masteel Group (马钢集团), also known as Magang (Group) Holding, a state-owned Chinese steel-making enterprise
- Maanshan Iron and Steel (马鞍山钢铁股份有限公司), the subsidiary company of Magang (Group) Holding

== Locations in China ==
- Magang, Dianbai County (麻岗镇), town in Guangdong
- Magang, Kaiping (马冈镇), town in Guangdong
- Magang, Hubei (马港镇), town in Tongcheng County
- Magang (马岗村), Liuji, Dawu County, Xiaogan, Hubei
