= Hengjian Holding =

Chinese holding company

- Company type: state-owned enterprise
- Industry: equity investment, electricity
- Founded: 20 August 2007
- Founder: Guangdong Government
- Headquarters: Guangzhou, Guangdong, China
- Revenue: ▼CN¥46.907 billion (2015)
- Operating income: ▲CN¥10.047 billion (2015)
- Net income: ▲CN¥3.442 billion (2015)
- Total assets: CN¥241.241 billion (2015)
- Total equity: ▲CN¥131.702 billion (2015)
- Owner: Guangdong Government (100%)
Parent
| Guangdong's SASAC | (direct) |
| Guangdong Government | (ultimate) |
Subsidiaries
| Guangdong Yudean Group | (76.00%) |
- Website: gdhjtz.com
- Footnotes / references in a consolidated financial statement

Guangdong Hengjian Investment Holding
- Simplified Chinese: 广东恒健投资控股
- Traditional Chinese: 廣東恆健投資控股
Transcriptions
Standard Mandarin
- Hanyu Pinyin: Guǎngdōng Héngjiàn Tóuzī Kònggǔ

Hengjian Holding
- Simplified Chinese: 恒健控股
- Traditional Chinese: 恆健控股
Transcriptions
Standard Mandarin
- Hanyu Pinyin: Héngjiàn Kònggǔ

Guangdong Hengjian Investment Holding Co., Ltd. known as Hengjian Holding is one of the holding companies of Guangdong Provincial People's Government.

The company acts as one of the investment vehicles of the provincial government in railways of Guangzhou–Dongguan–Shenzhen Intercity Railway, Dongguan–Huizhou Intercity Railway and Guangzhou–Foshan–Zhaoqing Intercity Railway, by invested CN¥10 billion in Guangdong Pearl River Delta Intercity Railway as minority shareholder. Hengjian Holding issued 8-year medium term note of the same amount in 2009. The other shareholders of Guangdong Pearl River Delta Intercity Railway were sister company Guangdong Provincial Railway Construction Investment Group and central-government owned Guangzhou Railway Group.

== Subsidiaries ==
- Guangdong Yudean Group (76.00%)

== Equity investments ==
- China Aviation Industry General Aircraft (10.00%)
- China General Nuclear Power Group (10.00%)
- CGN Power (10.00%)
- China Southern Power Grid (38.40%)
- Guangdong Pearl River Delta Intercity Railway (17.80%)
- Shaoguan Iron and Steel (49.00%)
- Zhanjiang Iron and Steel (28.20%)

== See also ==
- Guangdong Holdings
- Guangdong Provincial Railway Construction Investment Group
- Guangdong Rising Asset Management
