= Nanjing Iron and Steel Company =

Chinese steel maker

- Type: Public
- Traded as: SSE: 600282
- Industry: Steel manufacturing
- Founded: 1958 (predecessor); 18 March 1999 (date of incorporation)
- Founder: Nanjing Iron and Steel Group
- Headquarters: Nanjing, China
- Area served: China
- Revenue: ▲CN¥37.601 billion (2017)
- Net income: ▲CN¥3.200 billion (2017)
- Total assets: ▲CN¥37.735 billion (2017)
- Total equity: ▲CN¥11.575 billion (2017)
Owner
- Fosun International &
- Nanjing Iron and Steel Group
- (via Nangang United)
(43.47%)
- Parent: Nangang United

Chinese name
- Simplified Chinese: 南京钢铁股份有限公司
- Traditional Chinese: 南京鋼鐵股份有限公司
- Literal meaning: Nanjing Steel and Iron, Company Limited by Shares
Transcriptions
Standard Mandarin
- Hanyu Pinyin: Nánjīng gāngtiě gǔfèn yǒuxiàn gōngsī

Chinese short name
- Simplified Chinese: 南钢股份
- Traditional Chinese: 南鋼股份
- Literal meaning: Nansteel Share
Transcriptions
Standard Mandarin
- Hanyu Pinyin: Nángāng gǔfèn

Nanjing Iron and Steel Co., Ltd. (abb. NISCO) is a publicly traded steel maker based in Nanjing, Jiangsu Province, China. The parent company of NISCO is Nanjing Nangang Iron and Steel United Co., Ltd. (Chinese: 南京南钢钢铁联合有限公司), a joint venture of Hong Kong listed company Fosun International (the stake was jointly held by Fosun International and its subsidiaries) and Chinese state-owned enterprise Nanjing Iron and Steel Group in a 60–40 ratio.

NISCO involves the pressing and smelting of ferrous metals and sales of steel materials.

NISCO was a constituent of small cap SSE 380 Index from December 2015 to December 2017.

According to World Steel Association (Chinese companies data was provided by China Iron and Steel Association), the corporation was ranked the 45th in 2015 the world ranking by production volume (8.590 million metric tons).

== History ==
The steel plant in Nanjing was founded in 1958. In 1999 Nanjing Iron and Steel Group spin-off some of the assembly line of the steel plant, incorporating Nanjing Iron and Steel Co., Ltd. (NISCO).

The company became a publicly traded company in 2000 on the Shanghai Stock Exchange, despite the parent company still owned 70.95% shares. However, after several disinvestment, it no longer the controlling shareholder of the listed company. Instead, the controlling shareholder was replaced by joint ventures of Nanjing Iron and Steel Group in 2003 and again in 2009 under another legal person. The direct parent company also received the unlisted steel manufacturing assets from Nanjing Iron and Steel Group.

In 2010, NISCO acquired some assets (themselves were incorporated as 南京南钢产业发展有限公司, in short 南钢发展) from the direct parent company, Nangang United, as those businesses were classified as related parties but the listed company had business relation with them. NISCO paid the direct parent company in an all-share deal for CN¥9.1 billion nominal value, making Nangang United owned 83.78% shares of the listed company.

According to the public filings, after the acquisition, As of 31 December 2014, the listed company had a total assets (in consolidated financial statement) of CN¥39.538 billion, comparing to parent company Nangang United's CN¥41.273 billion. The net assets (excluding minority interests) were CN¥8.558 billion and CN¥8.344 billion respectively.

NISCO also had a long business partnership with Hong Kong listed company Prosperity International for trading iron ore. In 2011, NISCO acquired 10% shares of a company, All Wealthy Capital, from the chairman of Prosperity International, Wong Ben Koon, for US$50 million. The shares were sold back to Wong for US$50 million plus interests, as the initial public offering of All Wealthy Capital had failed, trigging the initial purchase condition. Since December 2014, Prosperity International became a related parties of NISCO, as Nanjing Iron and Steel Group owned more than 10% shares of Prosperity International.

Circa 2016, NISCO signed an agreement with banks for debt-to-equity swap. The capital increase of the subsidiary 南钢发展 by the bank and other parties, was completed in 2017. In the same year NISCO also issued CN¥1.788 billion new shares via private placement.

== Equity investments ==
As of 26 October 2016

- Tiangong International (5.06%)

== Shareholders ==
In 2003 the parent company of the listed company formed a joint venture "Nanjing Iron and Steel United" (Chinese: 南京钢铁联合有限公司) with a consortium of civilian-run enterprises: Fosun High Technology and its parent company Guangxin Technology (Chinese: 广信科技). The stake of NISCO that held by Nanjing Iron and Steel Group was injected to Nanjing Iron and Steel United as capital. After the deal, Nanjing Iron and Steel Group owned 40% stake of Nanjing Iron and Steel United, Fosun High Technology (and its subsidiary) owned 50% and Guangxin Technology owned 10%. The parent company of Fosun High Technology was later changed to Hong Kong listed company Fosun International, which also acquired the stake from Guangxin Technology. However, Fosun International was still controlled by the shareholder of Guangxin Technology as of 2018.

In 2009, a new intermediate holding company, "Nanjing Nangang Iron and Steel United Co., Ltd." (Chinese: 南京南钢钢铁联合有限公司, known as Nanjing Nangang or (Chinese: 南钢联; lit. 'Nangang United')) was incorporated, Nanjing Iron and Steel United became its wholly owned subsidiary, while Nanjing Iron and Steel United owned 62.69% stake of NISCO at that time. Baosteel Group was the second largest shareholder of the listed company for just 2.42% shares at that time.

As of 31 December 2015, Nangang United had disinvested NISCO to just 48.19%. On 31 December 2015, Fosun International also appointed Nanjing Iron and Steel Group as its proxy for 10% stake of Nangang United, making Nangang United was classified as a joint venture and not consolidated in Fosun International's consolidated financial statements, while Nanjing Iron and Steel Group regained the joint-controlling status on the publicly traded company.

As of 31 December 2015

- Guo Guangchang
  - Fosun International Holdings (64.45% owned by Guo Guangchang)
    - Fosun International (SEHK: 656, 71.37% owned by Fosun International Holdings)
      - Nanjing Nangang Iron and Steel United (60% owned by Fosun International)
        - Nanjing Iron and Steel (48.19% owned by Nangang United)
      - Nanjing Iron and Steel Group (owned 40% of Nanjing Nangang Iron and Steel United)
    - Chinese: 南京钢铁创业投资有限公司; lit. 'Nanjing Iron and Steel Venture Investment' (owned 51% of Nanjing Iron and Steel Group)
  - worker union of Nanjing Iron and Steel Group (owned 36.07% of Nanjing Iron and Steel Venture Investment)

- Nanjing Municipal People's Government via Nanjing New Industrialization Investment Group (owned 49% of Nanjing Iron and Steel Group)
- Liang Xinjun (owned 24.44% of Fosun International Holdings)
- Wang Qunbin (owned 11.11% of Fosun International Holdings)
- other shareholders of Fosun International (owned 28.63% of Fosun International)

- employees ownership scheme (2.18% of NISCO)
- National Social Security Fund (0.68% of NISCO)
- other shareholders of NISCO (48.95% of NISCO)
