= Nanjing Iron and Steel Group =

Chinese conglomerate company

- Company type: Joint venture
- Industry: Conglomerate
- Founded: 1958; 1996 (date of incorporation)
- Headquarters: Nanjing, China
- Area served: China
- Products: Steel (via JV), Real estate
- Services: Hospital, logistic
- Owner: Nanjing Iron and Steel Venture Investment (51%); Nanjing New Industrialization Investment Group (49%)
- Parent: Nanjing Iron and Steel Venture Investment
- Subsidiaries: Nanjing Nangang Iron & Steel United (JV 40%); Nanjing Sanjin Real Estate Development (100%)

Nanjing Iron and Steel Group Corp., Ltd.
- Simplified Chinese: 南京钢铁集团有限公司
- Traditional Chinese: 南京鋼鐵集團有限公司
Transcriptions

Nanjing Iron and Steel Group
- Simplified Chinese: 南京钢铁集团
- Traditional Chinese: 南京鋼鐵集團
Transcriptions

Nangang Group
- Simplified Chinese: 南钢集团
- Traditional Chinese: 南鋼集團
- Literal meaning: Nansteel Group
Transcriptions

Nanjing Iron and Steel Group Corp., Ltd. is a Chinese conglomerate company based in Nanjing, Jiangsu Province, China. It was a state-owned enterprise, but now it is a joint venture of Nanjing Iron and Steel Venture Investment (Chinese: 南京钢铁创业投资有限公司, about 36.07% owned by the worker union of Nanjing Iron and Steel Group) and state-owned enterprise Nanjing New Industrialization Investment Group in a 51–49 ratio. Nanjing Iron and Steel Group formed another joint venture with Fosun International as an intermediate holding company of Nanjing Iron and Steel Company, in a 60–40 ratio. On 31 December 2015 Fosun International appointed Nanjing Iron and Steel Group as a proxy for 1/6 of their voting rights, making the voting rights were equally shared between Nanjing Iron and Steel Group and Fosun International after 31 December 2015.

== History ==
The predecessor of Nanjing Iron and Steel Group was founded in 1958 as a steel plant. It was one of the 18 small-sized steel plants established in 18 provinces of China. In 1996 the plant was incorporated as Nanjing Iron and Steel Group Corp., Ltd.. It was one of the 512 important state-owned enterprises in 1997. (1 of 47 iron and steel industry) In 1999, the major assets of the group was reincorporated as Nanjing Iron and Steel Company (NISCO), which was listed to Shanghai Stock Exchange in 2000. The group retained some assets such as logistic company and hospital. In 2003, Nanjing Iron and Steel Group injected the stake of NISCO to a new intermediate holding company formed with the consortium of Fosun High Technology and its parent company Guangxin Technology (Chinese: 广信科技). Nanjing Iron and Steel Group owned 40% stake of the new intermediate holding company, Nanjing Nangang Iron & Steel United in exchange.

In 2000 Nanjing Iron and Steel Group acquired the controlling interests in Huaigang Group. After capital increase, it was diluted to 26.15%. The stake was transferred back to Huai'an Municipal People's Government in 2005. A CN¥10 million investment by Nanjing Iron and Steel Group on Huaigang Group was also refurbished by Huai'an Government to Nanjing Government in the same year.

In 2010, the residual unlisted steel manufacturing assets of Nanjing Nangang Iron & Steel United was injected to the listed company Nanjing Iron and Steel Company.

In 2014, Nanjing Iron and Steel Group made a public offer to sell 100% stake of its subsidiary Nanjing Sanjin Real Estate Development (Chinese: 南京三金房地产开发) for CN¥170 million. However, no firm willing to buy the subsidiary. In 2016, another subsidiary Xinlei (Chinese: 鑫磊) was sold to Modern Land (China) (SEHK: 1107) for CN¥340 million.

On 31 December 2015, Nanjing Iron and Steel Group regained 10% voting rights on the joint venture by signing an agreement to act as a proxy for a subsidiary of Fosun International. (SEHK: 656, Fosun Intl. itself was a new intermediate holding company for the owners of Guangxin Technology)

== Equity investments ==
As at 30 June 2016, Nanjing Iron and Steel Group also owned 12.05% shares of Prosperity International (SEHK: 803).

== See also ==
- Meishan Iron and Steel, another steel manufacturer in Nanjing
