= Masteel Group =

Chinese iron and steel enterprise

Ma Gang (Group) Holding Co., Ltd.
- Trade name: Ma Steel Group
- Formerly: Ma anshan Iron Mining Plant; Ma'anshan Iron and Steel Company; Magang Holding Company
- Company type: State-owned enterprise
- Industry: Steel manufacturing; holding company
- Founded: 1953
- Headquarters: Ma'anshan, Anhui province, China
- Area served: China
Key people
Wei Yao	(Chairman & Party Committee Secretary)
Products
Steel	(via listed subsidiary)
Ore mining	(via unlisted subsidiary)
Services
Education	(former)
Medical service	(former)
- Revenue: 91,784,330,000 renminbi (2018)
Owner
China Baowu Steel Group	(51%)
Anhui provincial government	(49%)
- Parent: China Baowu Steel Group
- Subsidiaries: Maanshan Iron and Steel Company Limited (45.54%)

Chinese name
- Simplified Chinese: 马钢（集团）控股有限公司
- Traditional Chinese: 馬鋼（集團）控股有限公司
- Literal meaning: Ma[anshan] steel [and Iron] (group) holding, limited company
Transcriptions
Standard Mandarin
- Hanyu Pinyin: Mǎgāng (jítuán) kònggǔ yǒuxiàn gōngsī

former name
- Simplified Chinese: 马鞍山钢铁公司
- Traditional Chinese: 馬鞍山鋼鐵公司
- Literal meaning: Ma'anshan steel and iron company
Transcriptions
Standard Mandarin
- Hanyu Pinyin: Mǎ'ānshān gāngtiě gōngsī

short name
- Simplified Chinese: 马钢集团
- Traditional Chinese: 馬鋼集團
Transcriptions
Standard Mandarin
- Hanyu Pinyin: Mǎgāng Jítuán
- Website: www.magang.com.cn

Ma gang (Group) Holding Co., Ltd., or known as Masteel Group, is one of the major Chinese iron and steel enterprises. Since 2019, it is a joint venture of central government owned China Baowu Steel Group and Anhui Provincial People's Government's State-owned Assets Supervision and Administration Commission (SASAC). It is headquartered in Ma'anshan, Anhui province. The group produced iron and steel via its listed subsidiary Maanshan Iron and Steel Company Limited, which was a listed company since 1993. However, the group had a significant part remained unlisted.

In Chinese language, the company was nicknamed as "A flower of Jiangnan".

== History ==
Ma Steel Group, as a steel plant, was founded in 1953 as "Maanshan Iron Mining Plant" (Chinese: 马鞍山铁厂; lit. 'Ma'anshan iron plant') in the city named 马鞍山 which means "horse saddle hill". In 1958, it was renamed to "Maanshan Iron and Steel Company", (Chinese: 马鞍山钢铁公司 or transliterated as "Maanshan Iron and Steel Corporation"). In the 1950s, it was considered as one of the 5 medium-sized steel plants of the People's Republic of China, behind the top 3 at that time: Anshan, Wuhan and Baotou.

According to the company, the steel plant was the first Chinese manufacturer of train wheel and tires, which was first produced in 1962. As of 1993, the train wheel and tire production lines of the group were unique (Chinese: 唯一) [sic] in the People's Republic of China.

In 1970, a limestone mine located in Chuanshan, Zhenjiang city, was under the administration of the group. However, after the establishment of Shanghai Baoshan Iron and Steel, the mine became a supplier of Baoshan Iron & Steel instead. The administration of the mine was also transferred to the metallurgical bureau of Zhenjiang city.

According to Financial Times, in the 1980s to 1990s, 85% of the tax revenue of the Ma'anshan city, were contributed by the group. The group also employed 90,000 out of 2 million citizens at its peak.

=== 1990s to present ===
In 1993, a subsidiary was incorporated as Maanshan Iron and Steel Company Limited (Chinese: 马鞍山钢铁股份有限公司), which the original "Ma'anshan Iron and Steel Company" was renamed to "Magang Holding Company" (Chinese: 马钢总公司). The former was listed on the Stock Exchange of Hong Kong on 3 November 1993 and the Shanghai Stock Exchange on 6 January 1994; the latter, was renamed to Magang (Group) Holding Company Limited (Chinese: 马钢（集团）控股有限公司) in 1998. Magang (Group) Holding Company Limited was also known as Masteel Group (Chinese: 马钢集团) for short. Maanshan Iron and Steel Company Limited was one of the first state-owned enterprises of the People's Republic of China to be a listed company. It was also the largest H shares initial public offering at that time.

After the split, Masteel Group had transformed into a holding company which owns the controlling stake of the listed company, as well as other auxiliary divisions such as education, hospitals and mining. According to news report, the unlisted portion of the group also had a property development division. In 2012, the public relation division of the group had told the journalist that the real estates were for the employees of the group, and not-for-sale to the general public. However, some of the fellow steel producers were selling their developed property to the general public. Nevertheless, Masteel Group purchased a land in 2009, but sold the land and the properties that was under construction to other investors in 2018. A section of that land had been developed by Masteel Group and the apartments and house were sold already.

In 2003, the university of the group for the continuous education of the staff (Chinese: 马钢职工大学), was transformed into Anhui Vocational College of Metallurgy and Technology (Chinese: 安徽冶金科技职业学院). The university itself was founded in 1983.

In 2004, Masteel Group transferred 17 primary and secondary schools to the relevant provincial authority. In 2005, the hospital of the group was sold to the employees of the hospital, with the group retained 27.79% shares. Hengkang Medical Group (Chinese: 恒康医疗), a listed company, was attempted to purchase the hospital from the new owners in 2018. As of 2018, Masteel Group still owned 6.48% shares of the hospital.

After not involving in steel business directly since the establishment of the listed subsidiary in 1993, the Masteel Group and the listed subsidiary formed a joint venture in trading scarp steel in 2012, which Masteel Group owned 55% stake of the joint venture, while the listed subsidiary owned 45% stake. In 2019, a CN¥300 million capital increase of the scarp steel trading joint venture was announced.

In terms of assets, as at 31 December 2015, Masteel Group, including the listed subsidiary, owned CN¥82.276 billion of total assets in consolidated financial statement in the Chinese accounting standards. In the same reporting period, the listed subsidiary owned CN¥62.454 billion.

According to a news report, the mining subsidiary of Masteel Group (Chinese: 马钢集团矿业有限公司) had significantly invested in mine rehabilitation, which from 2014 to the date of the news article was written (circa 2018), the subsidiary had planted 12,000 trees, as well as a capital investment of more than CN¥7 million. The subsidiary was established in 2011 by merging subsidiaries and divisions into one subsidiary; The mining subsidiary owned 5 mines, namely: Nanshan Mine (南山矿), Gushan Mine (姑山矿), Taochong Mine (桃冲矿), Luohe Mine (罗河矿) and Zhangzhuang Mine (张庄矿).

In mid-2019, central government owned China Baowu Steel Group acquired 51% stake of Masteel Group from the State-owned Assets Supervision and Administration Commission (SASAC) of Anhui Provincial People's Government for free. The acquisition also included the indirect controlling stake (45.54%) of the list subsidiary Maanshan Iron and Steel Co., Ltd. Baowu was owned by Central Government (The State Council)'s SASAC. According to World Steel Association, China Baowu Steel Group was the world second-largest steel producer by volume in year 2018, while Masteel Group was ranked the 16th. In 2018, China Baowu Steel Group and their subsidiaries had produced 67.43 million metric tons of steel, while Masteel Group, including the subsidiary Maanshan Iron and Steel Co., Ltd., had produced 19.64 million metric tons. (Note: The listed subsidiary of Masteel Group, disclosed that the company had produced 19.64 million metric tons of crude steel and had further processed into 18.70 million metric tons of steel.) It was speculated by the journalist that the enlarged China Baowu Steel Group could reach 100 million metric tons of steel production capacity by their methodology, (Note: For example, World Steel Association had stated "30%-50% ownership, pro-rata tonnage is included" and not including minority ownership (less than 30% ownership).) despite by equity ratio, Baowu only owned 22.23% shares of the indirect subsidiary Maanshan Iron and Steel Co., Ltd., the steel production entity of Masteel Group.
