= Meishan (disambiguation) =

Méishān (lit. Méi Hill) is the romanization of Chinese names 眉山, 梅山 or 煤山. It might refer to:

== Administrative district ==
- Meishan, Sichuan
- Meishan, Nanjing (Chinese: 梅山; pinyin: Méishān), an area in Nanjing city, which formerly administrated by Shanghai city as exclave
  - Meishan Subdistrict, Nanjing (Chinese: 梅山街道)
- Meishan Island, an island of Ningbo, Zhejiang
  - Meishan Subdistrict, Ningbo (Chinese: 梅山街道)
- Meishan Subdistrict, Nanping (Chinese: 梅山街道) in Fujian.
- Meishan Subdistrict, Ruzhou (Chinese: 煤山街道) in Ruzhou, Henan.
- Meishan Township, Chiayi (Chinese: 梅山鄉) in Taiwan

== Mountain ==
- Meishan, Hunan (Chinese: 梅山), notable for being invaded by the Song dynasty
- Jingshan, also known as Meishan (Chinese: 煤山), a hill and a park in Beijing
- Meishan, Chengdu (Chinese: 煤山), a hill in Chengdu city, now demolished.

== See also ==
- Meishan Iron and Steel, a steel company based in Meishan, Nanjing
- Meishan pig (Chinese: 梅山猪), a pig breed named after Meishan, Nanjing
