= GDH =

GDH may refer to:

- Gajirrabeng dialect, native to Australia
- GDH 559, a Thai film production company
- Glutamate dehydrogenase
- Gonzo (company), previously GDH K.K., a Japanese anime studio
- Gordon Hill railway station, in London
- Gosford Hospital
- Grand Ducal Highness
- Gross Domestic Happiness
- Guangdong Holdings, a Chinese holding company
