= Anu Ramdas =

Anu Ramdas (born 26 January 1980) is an artist, teacher and researcher based in Copenhagen, Denmark. She studied at The Royal Danish Academy of Fine Arts, the Department of Experimental Art at the Central Academy of Fine Arts in Beijing, China, and at Malmø Art ,Academy.

She has done international residencies with La Wayaka Current in Armila, Panama (2018–19) SALT Beyoglu in Istanbul, Turkey (2013), Can Lis in Porto Petro, Spain (2013), and Bucharest AIR in Romania (2012).

In 2016 she collaborated with the Danish artist Christian Danielewitz on the project Against the Grain which addresses a very important topic; the relationship between our use of technology and the global strain on the environment which follows. The two Danish artists travelled to the industrial town of Baotou – the epicenter of the Chinese mining industry, in Inner Mongolia. Here they created the works on location, using radioactive material from the gigantic tailings dam Weikuang, situated on the outskirts of the city. Weikuang Dam is a nightmare landscape, which has formed as a result of the ruthless hunt for rare earth elements, the essential material basis of our high-tech societies. The project has been presented at Galleri Image, in Aarhus, Denmark (2016) Galleri [format] in Malmø, Sweden (2017) at Savvy Contemporary in Berlin, Germany (2019).

In 2016 she released the book Against the Grain and in 2014 White City / Black Desert – Black City / White Desert in collaboration with Christian Danielewitz.

Since 2015, Anu Ramdas has held the position as an associate assistant at the laboratory of photography at The Royal Danish Academy of Fine Arts in Copenhagen.

== Selected exhibitions ==
- The Long Term You Cannot Afford, SAVVY Contemporary Berlin
- Floating Art 2019, Vejle Art Museum
- Against the Grain, Fotogalleriet [format] Malmø
- Against the Grain, Galleri Image Aarhus
- Mauna, Danske Grafikernes Hus Copenhagen
- Ung Dansk Fotografi '15, Fotografisk Center Copenhagen
- Koh-I-Noor, Den Frie -Center of Contemporary Art Copenhagen
- Hotel Ararat, Polistar Istanbul
- Light! More Light!, Atelier 35 Romania
- AFGANG '11, Nikolaj Contemporary Art Center Copenhagen
- 798 Art Zone Beijing

== Notes ==
- Anu Ramdas; Christian Danielewitz. Against the Grain. Antipyrine. 2016 ISBN 978-87-93108-63-9
- Anu Ramdas; Christian Danielewitz. White City / Black Desert - Black City / White Desert. Forlagetasterisk. ISBN 978-87-92733-39-9
- Anu Ramdas. Travel Light. Piccadilly Expedition Company. Forlagetasterisk. ISBN 978-87-92-733-37-5
