= Maanshan Iron & Steel =

Chinese steel manufacturer

Maanshan Iron & Steel Company Limited
- Company type: Public; state-owned enterprise
Traded as
SSE: 600808	(A share)
SEHK: 323	(H share)
- ISIN: CNE000000DD4; CNE1000003R8
- Industry: Steel manufacturing
- Founded: 1993
- Founder: Masteel Group
- Headquarters: Ma'anshan, Anhui province, China
- Area served: China
- Key people: Ding Yi (Chairman)
- Products: Steel
- Owner: Masteel Group (45.54%)
- Parent: Masteel Group

Chinese name
- Simplified Chinese: 马鞍山钢铁股份有限公司
- Literal meaning: Ma'anshan steel and iron, company limited by shares
Transcriptions
- Website: www.magang.com.hk

Maanshan Iron & Steel Company Limited, known as Maanshan Iron & Steel or just Masteel (in Chinese Magang) is a Chinese listed company which engaged in steel manufacturing. The company was based in Ma'anshan, Anhui province. Since its establishment in 1993, it was controlled by the Chinese governments. However, the indirect parent company was changed to central government owned China Baowu Steel Group in June 2019, after the Group acquired 51% stake of Masteel Group, the direct parent company of the listed company from the Anhui provincial government.

== History ==
=== Predecessor ===
The history of the steel plant could be traced back to "Ma'anshan Iron Mining Plant", established in 1953. The steel plant was renamed to "Ma'anshan Iron and Steel Company", (Chinese: 马鞍山钢铁公司 or transliterated as "Ma'anshan Iron and Steel Corporation"). In the 1950s, it was considered as one of the 5 medium-sized steel plants of the People's Republic of China, behind the top 3 at that time: Anshan, Wuhan and Baotou. In the 1970s, the production process of the Group mainly comprised cooking, sintering, iron smelting, steel smelting and rolling.

=== Maanshan Iron & Steel Company Limited ===
In 1993, Maanshan Iron & Steel Company Limited was established to list the steel manufacturing assets in the stock exchanges, auxiliary divisions were not listed. The old "Ma'anshan Iron and Steel Company" was renamed to "Magang Holding Company", but remained as the parent and the holding company of the listed company. It was one of the first Chinese state-owned enterprises to be a listed company.

In 1998 the parent company was renamed into Magang (Group) Holding Co., Ltd., but commonly known as Masteel Group.

In the 2010s, the listed company had become a supplier of the train wheels and tires for China Railway High-speed trains such as Fuxing.

In 2016, as part of the national policy to retire old-age steel production facilities as well as scale-down steel production volume, Maanshan Iron & Steel started to retire some of their production line. In 2018, the retirement was completed.

== Controversies ==
In 2015, [sic] hundreds (Note: According to a self-published news report in boxun.com, 5,000 people were involved in January 2016 protest which was held in a square of the former steel plant, with some protesters had blocked the traffic near the gate of the steel plant, while Financial Times reported hundreds of protesters were on the street in 2015. The same Boxun news report also stated the previous protest was held in April 2014, in the form of labour strike. Both sources confirmed the existence of protest(s) but contradicted on details.) of lay-off workers protested the closing of a steel plant of the listed company in Hefei, the capital of Anhui province, demanding a fairer compensation. The plant was formerly known as "Hefei Iron and Steel" (Chinese: 合肥钢铁 or in short 合钢) but renamed to "Masteel (Hefei) Iron and Steel" (Chinese: 马钢（合肥）钢铁) after became a subsidiary of Maanshan Iron and Steel. It was closed down due to heavy pollution. Some part of the Hefei steel plant had become a national monument, as the first steel plant (instead of iron) of the province.

In early 2016, fellow Chinese steel maker and later the parent company Baosteel Group (now China Baowu Steel Group) was accused by US Steel Corporation of stealing commercial secrets. Baosteel rejected these allegations. The United States International Trade Commission (ITC) launched a probe into these allegations in May 2016, which Maanshan Iron and Steel was included in the investigation along with other Chinese steel maker such as Wuhan Iron and Steel, which was also part of China Baowu Steel Group since 2016.
