= Attarat Power Plant =

Oil shale-fueled power plant in Jordan

- Country: Jordan
- Location: Attarat Umm Ghudran
- Coordinates: 31°16′08″N 36°26′52″E
- Status: Commissioned
- Construction began: 16 March 2017
- Commission date: 25 October 2022 (Unit 1) 26 May 2023 (Unit 2)
- Construction cost: 2.1 Billion USD
- Owners: YTL Power International (45%); Guangdong Energy Group Co., Ltd. (45%); Eesti Energia (10%)
- Operator: Attarat Power Company

Thermal power station
- Primary fuel: Oil shale

Power generation
- Units operational: 2 X 235 MW
- Make and model: Siemens
- Units planned: 2 x 235 MW (net)
- Nameplate capacity: 470 MW

External links
- Website: attaratpower.com.jo

Attarat Power Plant is an oil shale-fueled power plant constructed in the Attarat, Umm Ghudran|Attarat Umm Ghudran area, 50 kilometres (31 mi) east of Al Qatranah, in Jordan. The project is developed by the Attarat Power Company (APCO), a partnership between YTL Power International (45%), Guangdong Energy Group Co., Ltd. (45%) and Eesti Energia (10%). It is the first oil shale power plant in Jordan and the largest private sector project in Jordan to date.

== History ==
The project was originally developed by an Estonian power company Eesti Energia (Enefit). The concession agreement between the Ministry of Energy and Mineral Resources and National Electricity Power Company of Jordan (NEPCO), and Eesti Energia was signed on 30 April 2008. In 2010, YTL Power International bought a 30% stake in the project.

A 30-year power purchase agreement (PPA) was signed with Jordan in October 2014. The construction agreement was signed on 12 January 2016. The financial closure agreement was signed on 16 March 2017. At the same time, YTL Power International increased its stake in the project up to 45% and Guangdong Energy Group Co., Ltd. became a new shareholder also with 45% stake. Construction started shortly after.

== Technical description ==
The power plant has 554 MW (gross) and 477 MW (net) capacity. It will consist of two circulating-fluidized-bed units.

The power plant consumes 10 million tons of oil shale per year which will be provided from the nearby open-pit mine and it is also the biggest mine in Jordan. Over its 40-year lifetime it would need an oil-shale mining area of approximately 11 square kilometres (4.2 sq mi).

The plant is among the largest power plants in Jordan (the largest being Aqaba Thermal Power Station), and the largest oil shale-fired power plant in the world after Narva Power Plants in Estonia.

== Financing ==
The project costed US$2.1 billion. Shareholders will invest $528 million and the rest will be financed by $1.6 billion loan provided by the Bank of China and the Industrial and Commercial Bank of China, and guaranteed by China Export and Credit Insurance Corporation. This is the largest private project financing supported by China Export and Credit Insurance Corporation to date.

== Construction ==
The plant is designed by WorleyParsons. The engineering, procurement and construction contract was awarded to Guangdong Power Engineering Corporation, a subsidiary of China Energy Engineering Group. The power plant would be designed by WorleyParsons. It would use boilers provided by Foster Wheeler, and the turbine and generator by Siemens.

== See also ==
- Oil shale in Jordan
