= Shaoguan Iron and Steel =

Chinese steel manufacturer

Baosteel Group Guangdong Shaoguan Iron and Steel
- Formerly: Shaoguan Iron and Steel Group
- Type: State-owned enterprise
- Industry: Iron and steel manufacturing
- Founded: 1966 (as steel plant); 11 September 1989 (as company); December 1996 (as limited company)
- Headquarters: Guangzhou, China (legal); Shaoguan, China (general office)
- Key people: Li Shi-ping (Charmian & Party Committee Secretary)
- Revenue: ▲CN¥15.175 billion (2016)
- Operating income: ▲ (CN¥301 million) (2016)
- Net income: ▲CN¥54 million (2016)
- Total assets: CN¥19.117 billion (2016)
- Total equity: ▲CN¥4.822 billion (2016)
Owner
China Baowu Steel Group	(51%)
Hengjian Holding	(49%)
Parent
China Baowu Steel Group	(direct)
SASAC	(intermediate)
State Council	(ultimate)
Subsidiaries
SGIS Songshan	(53.37%)
Shaoguan Iron and Steel	(100.0%)
Chung Shan Development	(100.0%)

Baosteel Group Guangdong Shaoguan Iron and Steel Co., Ltd.
- Simplified Chinese: 宝钢集团广东韶关钢铁有限公司
- Traditional Chinese: 寶鋼集團廣東韶關鋼鐵有限公司
Transcriptions
Standard Mandarin
- Hanyu Pinyin: Bǎogāng jítuán guǎngdōng sháoguān gāngtiě yǒuxiàn gōngsī

SGIS Songshan Co., Ltd.
- Simplified Chinese: 广东韶钢松山股份有限公司
- Traditional Chinese: 廣東韶鋼松山股份有限公司
- Literal meaning: Guangdong Shaoguan Iron and Steel Songshan Company Limited by Shares
Transcriptions
Standard Mandarin
- Hanyu Pinyin: Guǎngdōng sháogāng sōngshān gǔfèn yǒuxiàn gōngsī

Baosteel Group Guangdong Shaoguan Iron and Steel Co., Ltd. known as Shaoguan Iron and Steel or SGIS or Shaogang (Chinese: 韶钢) or Shaosteel (formerly Shaoguan Iron and Steel Group) is a Chinese steel maker.

The company is a joint venture of central government-owned iron and steel conglomerate China Baowu Steel Group (51%; formerly known as Baosteel Group) and the government of Guangdong (49%).

== Structure ==
The company was registered in Guangzhou, Guangdong, but the general office is located in Maba, Qujiang District, Shaoguan, Guangdong. SGIS Group is the parent company of SGIS Songshan Co., Ltd. (SZSE: 000717) for 53.37% stake, which most of the group assets and revenue came from.

== History ==
The steel plant in Shaogang, Guangdong was established in 1966 (as Chinese: 韶关钢铁厂). In 1989 the plant was marketized as a company and was subsequently renamed into Guangdong Shaoguan Iron and Steel Group Corporation (Chinese: 广东省韶关钢铁集团公司) in December 1993. In December 1996, it became Guangdong Shaoguan Iron and Steel Group Co., Ltd. (Chinese: 广东省韶关钢铁集团有限公司) Shaoguan Iron and Steel was one of the most 512 important state-owned enterprises in 1997. In early 2000, the enterprise was among 120 companies selected in a pilot project aimed at rapidly improving their international competitiveness.

== Subsidiaries ==
In 1997, Shaoguan Iron and Steel Group was split into 5 main subsidiaries: SGIS Songshan (Chinese: 广东韶钢松山股份有限公司, incorporated on 29 April 1997), "Chung Shan Investment & Development" (Chinese: 松山置业发展, "Chung Shan Development" in short), (Note: Chung Shan Investment & Development Co., Ltd. was incorporated on 4 August 1994 in Hong Kong, Chung Shan was Cantonese translation of Songshan) "Shaoguan Iron and Steel Co., Ltd.", (Note: Shaoguan Iron and Steel Co., Ltd. was incorporated in 1990; minority stakes were owned by Chung Shan Investment & Development and Guangdong Assets Management (BVI) No.4 Limited; the British Virgin Islands company was strike off due to non-payment of annual fee in 2015; it was reported that the BVI was also owned by SGIS Group, acquired from Guangdong Enterprises) and two other subsidiaries. In the same year the shares of SGIS Songshan were floated at the Shenzhen Stock Exchange. The initial public offering price was CN¥7.76 per share; SGIS Group incorporated the listed company for CN¥1.50 only, by injecting a net assets of CN¥359 million for 240 million shares.

In 2008, an agreement was signed with Baosteel Group that 100% shares of Shaoguan Iron and Steel Group and Guangzhou Iron and Steel Enterprise Group would be injected into "Guangdong Iron and Steel Group" as share capital. As a result, the State-owned Assets Supervision and Administration Commissions (SASACs) of Guangdong Province and Guangzhou City respectively, would come to own a combined 20% stake in Guangdong Iron and Steel Group. However, the deal collapsed.

In 2011, a 51% stake of Shaoguan Iron and Steel Group was transferred from SASAC of Guangdong Province to Baosteel Group, a steel conglomerate and supervised by the central government's SASAC.

In September 2012, the remaining 49% were transferred to a wholly owned subsidiary of Guangdong SASAC, namely Guangdong Hengjian Investment Holding (Chinese: 广东恒建投资控股有限公司). In November 2012 Shaoguan Iron and Steel Group was recapitalized for CN¥1.851 billion.

In December 2012, the company was once more renamed into Baosteel Group Guangdong Shaoguan Iron and Steel Co., Ltd. (Chinese: 宝钢集团广东韶关钢铁有限公司).

In June 2013 SGIS Group subscribed CN¥1.5 billion capital increase of SGIS Songshan for CN¥2 each (750 million shares). In March 2015 SGIS Group sold 2.976% shares (72 million shares) of SGIS Songshan for a weighed-average price of CN¥5.58. In September 2015 the group bought back 0.32% shares (approx. 7.7 million in number) for a weighed-average of CN¥5.33 each.

On 28 September 2016, Shaoguan Iron and Steel Group was recapitalized again for CN¥3.3 billion. It was planned to buy back some assets from the listed subsidiary for CN¥4.45 million. SGIS Songshan also sold some assets to an associate company: Baosteel Special Steel Shaoguan for CN¥1.81 million (SGIS Songshan owned 49% of Baosteel Special Steel Shaoguan indirectly, the rest was owned by China Baowu Steel Group via Baosteel Special Steel).

== Financial data ==
in consolidated financial statement (in CN¥)
Shaoguan Iron and Steel Group							SGIS Songshan						
Year	Revenue	Profit	Total assets	Equity	no. of Songshan shares	%	Revenue	Profit	Profit to group	Total assets	Equity	Equity to group	Net asset per shares
1997 (restated)					240 million	75.0%	▲2.251 billion	▲170 million	▲128 million	▲1.373 billion	▲1.135 billion	▲852 million	▲3.55
1998 (restated)					▲312 million	75.0%	▲2.671 billion	▲176 million	▲132 million	▲2.490 billion	▲1.907 billion	▲1.430 billion	▲4.56
1999 (restated)					312 million	75.0%	▲3.048 billion	▼164 million	▼123 million	▼2.412 billion	▲1.988 billion	▲1.491 billion	▲4.78
2000 (restated)					312 million	69.77%	▲3.346 billion	▲204 million	▲143 million	▲2.967 billion	▲2.250 billion	▲1.570 billion	▲5.03
2001 (restated)					312 million	69.77%	▲3.926 billion	▲259 million	▲180 million	▲3.888 billion	▲2.559 billion	▲1.785 billion	▲5.72
2002 (restated)					312 million	69.77%	▲4.431 billion	▲349 million	▲244 million	▲5.274 billion	▲2.729 billion	▲1.904 billion	▲6.10
2003					▲468 million	55.83%	▲7.161 billion	▲982 million	▲548 million	▲8.049 billion	▲4.319 billion	▲2.411 billion	▼5.15
2004					468 million	55.83%	▲10.329 billion	▼948 million	▼529 million	▲11.010 billion	▲5.016 billion	▲2.800 billion	▲5.98
2005 (restated)					▲606 million	45.15%	▲10.799 billion	▼147 million	▼66 million	▲12.377 billion	▼4.880 billion	▼2.203 billion	▼3.64
2006 (restated)					606 million	45.15%	▲12.516 billion	▲424 million	▲191 million	12.373 billion	▲5.326 billion	▲2.364 billion	▲3.90
2007					606 million	36.27%	▲14.961 billion	▲827 million	▲300 million	▲16.838 billion	▲7.406 billion	▲2.686 billion	▲4.44
2008					606 million	36.27%	▲19.108 billion	▼ (1.611 billion)	▼ (584 million)	▲17.281 billion	▼5.704 billion	▼2.069 billion	▼3.42
2009					606 million	36.27%	▼13.350 billion	▲93 million	▲34 million	▲18.341 billion	▲5.797 billion	▲2.103 billion	▲3.47
2010					606 million	36.27%	▲18.836 billion	▼21 million	▼8 million	▲23.099 billion	5.817 billion	2.110 billion	3.47
2011	▲24.664 billion	▼ (497 million)	▲27.127 billion	▼2.154 billion	606 million	36.27%	▲22.874 billion	▼ (1.138 billion)	▼ (413 million)	▲24.361 billion	▼4.679 billion	▼1.697 billion	▼2.80
2012	▼20.822 billion	▼ (562 million)	▼23.407 billion	▲3.444 billion	606 million	36.27%	▼19.260 billion	▼ (1.952 billion)	▼ (708 million)	▼20.488 billion	▼2.730 billion	▼990 million	▼1.64
2013 (restated)	20.574 billion	▲ (46 million)	▲24.574 billion	▼3.360 billion	▲1.356 billion	56.02%	19.171 billion	▲101 million	▲57 million	▲21.647 billion	▲4.347 billion	▲2.435 billion	▲1.80
2014	20.958 billion	▼ (677 million)	▼21.418 billion	▼2.674 billion	1.356 billion	56.02%	▲19.497 billion	▼ (1.388 billion)	▼ (778 million)	▼18.570 billion	▼2.937 billion	▼1.645 billion	▼1.21
2015	▼12.030 billion	▼ (1.387 billion)	▼19.076 billion	▼1.463 billion	▼1.291 billion	53.37%	▼11.145 billion	▼ (2.596 billion)	▼ (1.385 billion)	▼16.560 billion	▼355 million	▼189 million	▼0.15
2016	▲15.175 billion	▲54 million	19.117 billion	▲4.822 billion		53.37%							

== Shareholders ==
- State-owned Assets Supervision and Administration Commission of the State Council
  - China Baowu Steel Group (51%)
- State-owned Assets Supervision and Administration Commission of Guangdong Provincial People's Government
  - Hengjian Holding (49%)

== Subsidiaries ==
- Chung Shan Investment & Development (simplified Chinese: 松山置业发展; traditional Chinese: 松山置業發展; pinyin: Sōngshān Zhìyè Fāzhǎn, 100%)
- SGIS Songshan (53.37%)
- Shaoguan Iron and Steel (70.00% directly; 22.15% via Chung Shan Investment & Development and 7.85% by Guangdong Assets Management (BVI) No.4 Limited)
