= Deng Qilin =

Chinese business executive

- 邓崎琳
- Born: November 1951 (age 74); Jinshi City, China
- Education: Wuhan University of Science and Technology
- Occupations: Chairman of Wuhan Iron & Steel Corp. (2013–2015); General manager of Wuhan Iron & Steel Corp. (1995–2013)
- Years active: 1992–2015
- Political party: Chinese Communist Party (1978–2016, expelled)

Deng Qilin (Chinese: 邓崎琳; born November 1951) is a Chinese industrial engineer, manufacturing executive, and politician. He served as the chief executive of Wuhan Iron and Steel Corporation (WISCO) from 2013 to 2015. Deng was investigated for corruption by the Central Commission for Discipline Inspection and booted from the Communist Party for bribery and abuse of power, among other alleged offenses.

== Career ==
Deng was born in Jinshi City in November 1951. He graduated from Wuhan University of Science and Technology in 1975 and joined the Chinese Communist Party in 1978. After graduating, he became the engineer of the Steel Factory of WISCO. In 1995, he served as deputy manager of WISCO and General manager from 1995 to 2013. Deng became the Chairman of WISCO in 2013. He also was the 11th and 12th member of the National People's Congress.

On August 29, 2015, Deng was placed under investigation by the Central Commission for Discipline Inspection, the party's internal disciplinary body, for "serious violations of regulations and laws". On January 8, 2016, Deng was expelled from the Communist Party. The internal investigation concluded he had "taken part in superstitious activities", conducted "illicit transactions exchange power and sex," abused his power and took bribes, used his position of power to aid in the business activities of his family, and occupied corporate accommodations for personal use. Deng's investigation came at a particularly sensitive time for WISCO, which had in early 2016 announced the layoff of over half of its workers due to falling profitability.

On May 31, 2017, Deng was sentenced to 15 years in prison and fined five million yuan for taking bribes worth 55.39 million yuan by the Intermediate People's Court in Foshan.
