= Guangdong Investment =

Chinese company

- Type: public
- Traded as: SEHK: 270
- Industry: water supply, infrastructure, real estate, department store, hotel
- Founded: 5 January 1973 (predecessor); 12 July 1988 (as Guangdong Investment)
- Headquarters: Guangdong Investment Tower, Hong Kong Island, Hong Kong
- Area served: mainland China, Hong Kong
- Key people: Huang Xiaofeng (chairman)
- Owner: Guangdong Holdings (54.68%)
- Parent: Guangdong Holdings
- Website: gdi.com.hk

Guangdong Investment Limited
- Traditional Chinese: 粵海投資有限公司
- Simplified Chinese: 粤海投资有限公司
Transcriptions

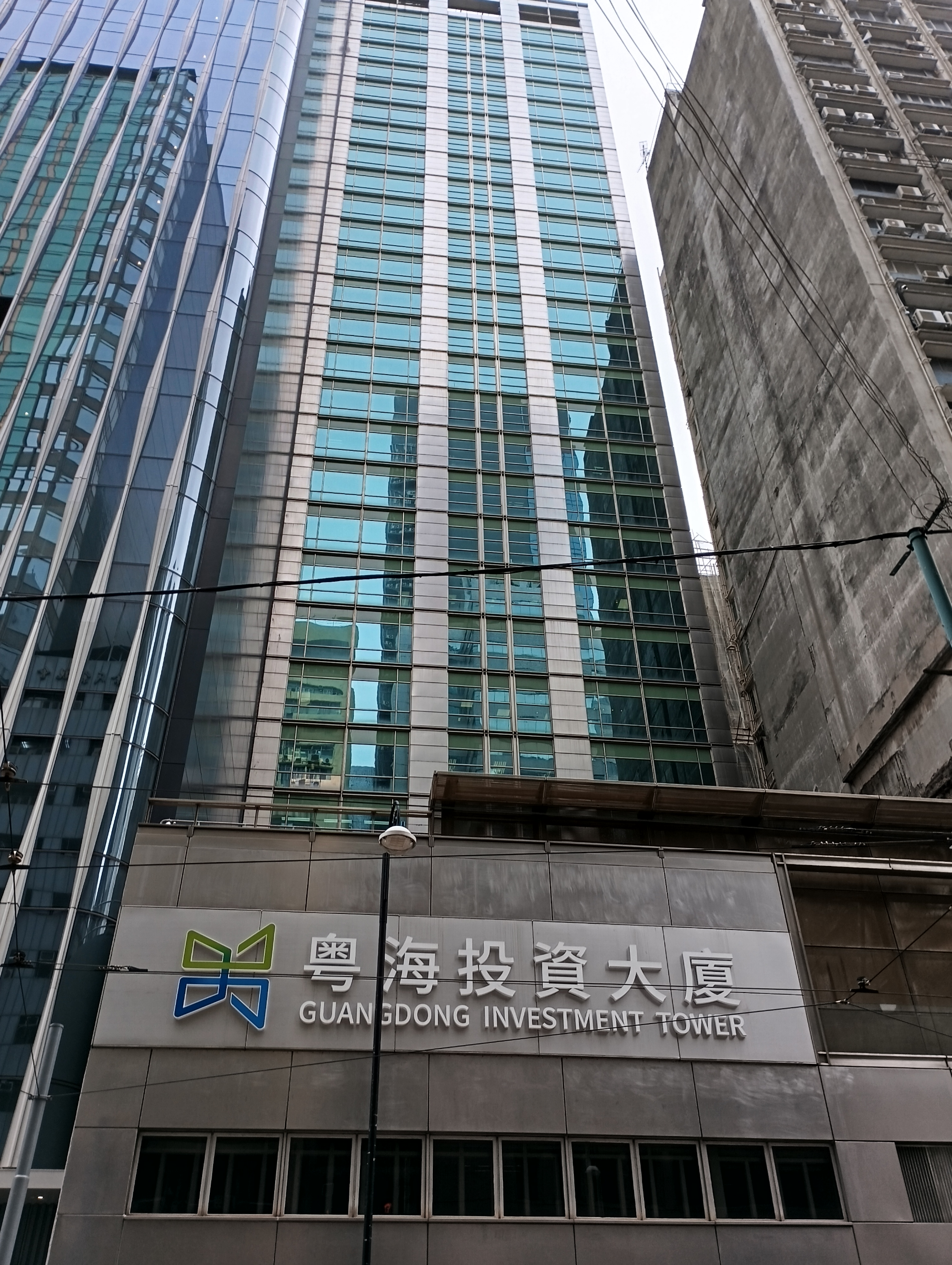
Guangdong Investment's headquarter is in Guangdong Investment Tower

Guangdong Investment Limited is a Chinese company incorporated in Hong Kong. It is engaged in the businesses of property, infrastructure, energy, water supply to Hong Kong, Shenzhen and Dongguan, hotel management and department store operations.

Guangdong Investment is a constituent of Hang Seng China-Affiliated Corporations Index (red chip index).

The parent company was Guangdong Holdings (held the stake via GDH Limited and Guangdong Trust) Guangdong Holdings is a wholly owned subsidiary of Guangdong Provincial People's Government.

== History ==
Union Globe Development Limited was incorporated on 5 January 1973 in Hong Kong. On 12 July 1988 it was renamed into Guangdong Investment Limited, which the listed company was acquired by Guangdong Enterprises: a "window company" of mainland China in the British colony. Since that year Guangdong Investment became a special purpose vehicle used by Guangdong Enterprises for backdoor listing its assets.
