= Baosight Software =

Chinese software company

Shanghai Baosight Software Co., Ltd.
- Trade name: Baosight
- Native name: 上海宝信软件股份有限公司
- Formerly: Shanghai Steel Tube Co., Ltd.
- Company type: Public subsidiary
- Traded as: SSE: 600845
- Industry: Information technology
- Founded: 1978; 48 years ago
- Headquarters: Shanghai, China
- Key people: Xia Xuesong (Chairman); Wang Jianhu (President)
- Revenue: ▼CN¥12.92 billion (2023)
- Net income: ▲CN¥2.61 billion (2023)
- Total assets: ▲CN¥21.88 billion (2023)
- Total equity: ▲CN¥12.09 billion (2023)
- Number of employees: 5,714 (2023)
- Parent: Baoshan Iron & Steel Co., Ltd.
- Website: www.baosight.com

Baosight Software (Baosight; Chinese: 宝信软件; pinyin: Bǎoxìn Ruǎnjiàn) is a Chinese software company that develops automation and software tools for various industries. It is a subsidiary of Baoshan Iron & Steel Co., Ltd.

== Background ==
The origins of the company can be traced to the automation department of Baowu. It developed a very thorough understanding of steelmaking from its years of experience which helped the company become orientated towards on-site industrial control, manufacturing process management and business management.

On 25 September 1993, the department was restructured into a separate joint-stock company known as Shanghai Steel Tube. On 11 March 1994, it was listed on the Shanghai Stock Exchange.

In 2000 Baowu acquired a controlling stake of Shanghai Steel Tube. At that time Shanghai Steel Tube was on the brink of delisting from the exchange due to two consecutive years of losses, where "ST" prefix was added to its stock name.

In March 2001, Shanghai Steel Tube completed an asset swap with Shanghai Baosteel Information Industry to turn around its loss-making operation. The company also renamed to Shanghai Baosight Software. On 14 May 2001, the company was suspended from trading after three consecutive years of losses.

In May 2002, Baosight resumed trading after the business reported a net profit for the period April to December 2001. The company had never lost money when it came to the software business and was only losing money due to the steel tube manufacturing business. By performing an asset swap, the company was able to change from a steel manufacturer to an information technology company that was more profitable. At that time media criticized the company was heavily rely on intra-group (within Baosteel Group) business activities as revenue. The company had signed agreements with Hewlett-Packard and Merlin Gerin to diversify its business.

In December 2004, Baosight was acquired by Baoshan Iron & Steel Co., Ltd.

In December 2019, Baowu launched its Industrial internet of things platform which was the first in China's manufacturing industry. The platform was developed by Baosight.

In July 2021, Baosight shares reached an all-time high at the point in time after it unveiled China's first home-developed programmable logic controller for large industrial control systems. This was speculated to break the monopoly of foreign suppliers. The main technical indicators were verified by use in the metallurgical industry.

== See also ==
- Baoshan Iron & Steel Co., Ltd.
- Baowu
