= Xinjiang Ba Yi Iron and Steel =

Chinese steel maker

Ba Yi Iron and Steel Group
- Company type: State-owned enterprise
- Industry: Iron and steel manufacturing
- Founded: 1951 (as steel plant); 20 October 1995 (as company)
- Headquarters: Ürümqi, Xinjiang, China
- Area served: China
- Revenue: ▼CN¥11.4 billion (2015)
- Operating income: ▼ (CN¥5.2 billion) (2015)
- Net income: ▼ (CN¥3.9 billion) (2015)
- Total assets: ▼CN¥47.3 billion (2015)
- Total equity: ▼CN¥3.8 billion (2015)
- Owner: China Baowu Steel Group (76.93%); Xinjiang Investment Development (15%); Huarong Asset Management (7.95%); Xinjiang Financing Guarantee (0.12%)
- Parent: China Baowu Steel Group
- Subsidiaries: Ba Yi Iron and Steel (50.02%)
- Website: bygt.com.cn
- Footnotes / references in a consolidated basis

Ba Yi Iron and Steel
- Company type: Public
- Traded as: SSE: 600581
- Industry: Iron and steel manufacturing
- Founded: 27 July 2000
- Headquarters: Ürümqi, Xinjiang, China
- Area served: China
- Revenue: ▼CN¥10.6 billion (2015)
- Operating income: ▼ (CN¥2.5 billion) (2015)
- Net income: ▼ (CN¥2.5 billion) (2015)
- Total assets: ▼CN¥18.3 billion (2015)
- Total equity: ▼ (CN¥905 million) (2015)
- Owner: Ba Yi Iron and Steel Group (50.02%)
- Parent: Ba Yi Iron and Steel Group
- Footnotes / references in a consolidated basis

Baosteel Group Xinjiang Ba Yi Iron and Steel Co., Ltd.
- Simplified Chinese: 宝钢集团新疆八一钢铁有限公司
- Traditional Chinese: 寶鋼集團新疆八一鋼鐵有限公司
- Literal meaning: Baosteel Group Xinjiang August 1 Steel and Iron Limited [Liability] Company
Transcriptions
Standard Mandarin
- Hanyu Pinyin: Bǎogāng Jítuán Xīnjiāng bāyī gāngtiě yǒuxiàn gōngsī

Xinjiang Ba Yi Iron and Steel Co., Ltd.
- Simplified Chinese: 新疆八一钢铁股份有限公司
- Traditional Chinese: 新疆八一鋼鐵股份有限公司
- Literal meaning: Xinjiang August 1 Steel and Iron, Company Limited by Shares
Transcriptions
Standard Mandarin
- Hanyu Pinyin: Xīnjiāng bāyī gāngtiě gǔfèn yǒuxiàn gōngsī

Xinjiang Ba Yi Iron and Steel Co., Ltd. known as Ba Yi Iron & Steel or 8 1 Iron & Steel or August 1 Iron & Steel or BYIS or Bagang (Chinese: 八钢) or Basteel, is a Chinese steel maker based in Ürümqi, Xinjiang. The company was a second-tier subsidiary of China Baowu Steel Group, via Ba Yi Iron and Steel Group (now known as "Baosteel Steel Group Xinjiang Ba Yi Iron and Steel Co., Ltd."). The rest of the shares of the company float in Shanghai Stock Exchange. Xinjiang government is the minority shareholder of the holding company: Ba Yi Iron and Steel Group.

== History ==
=== Ba Yi Iron and Steel Group ===
The steel plant in Ürümqi (Chinese: 新疆八一钢铁总厂) was founded in 1951 by the People's Liberation Army (PLA). It was named "8 1" based on the date of the establishment of PLA on 1 August 1927. It was one of the 18 small-sized steel plants established in 18 provinces of China. Ba Yi Iron and Steel was one of the 512 important state-owned enterprises in 1997. (1 of 47 iron and steel industry)

It became a limited company after the marketization of China. A subsidiary was incorporated in 2000 to float the main steel manufacturing business in the stock exchange.

In 2007 Ba Yi Iron and Steel Group was renamed from "Xinjiang Ba Yi Iron and Steel Group Co., Ltd." (Chinese: 新疆八一钢铁集团有限责任公司) to "Baosteel Group Xinjiang Ba Yi Iron and Steel Co., Ltd." (Chinese: 宝钢集团新疆八一钢铁有限公司). Baosteel Group acquired 69.56% stake of the company by injecting new share capital into the group (for CN¥3 billion), diluting the stake of the State-owned Assets Supervision and Administration Commission (SASAC) of the People's Government of Xinjiang Uyghur Autonomous Region to 15%. Xinjiang SASAC also transferred their stake to their wholly owned subsidiary "Xinjiang Investment Development (Group) Co., Ltd." (Chinese: 新疆投资发展(集团)有限责任公司) in the same year. In 2014 Ba Yi Iron and Steel Group was recapitalized again. The other shareholders of the group was China Huarong Asset Management for 7.95% stake and "Xinjiang Uyghur Autonomous Region Financing Guarantee Co., Ltd." (Chinese: 新疆维吾尔自治区融资担保有限责任公司) for 0.12% stake.

=== Ba Yi Iron and Steel [Share] ===
Xinjiang Ba Yi Iron and Steel Co., Ltd. (Chinese: 新疆八一钢铁股份有限公司) was incorporated in 2000. In 2002 the shares were floated in Shanghai Stock Exchange.

=== U.S. restrictions ===
The company was put under the Uygur Forced Labour Prevention Act (UFLPA) entity list by the U.S. Department of Homeland Security over concerns of Uyghur minorities in Xinjiang. The restrictions took effect on October 3, 2024.
