= Nebras Power Plant IPP1 =

AES Jordan PSC
- Country: Jordan
- Location: Al Manakher
- Coordinates: 31°53′56.6″N 36°4′47.2″E
- Status: Operational
- Construction began: 2007
- Commission date: 2009
- Construction cost: US$300 million
- Owners: AES Corporation; Mitsui & Co
- Operator: AES Jordan PSC

Thermal power station
- Primary fuel: Natural gas
- Secondary fuel: Diesel
- Combined cycle?: Yes

Power generation
- Nameplate capacity: 380 MW

External links
- Website: www.aes.com

Amman East Power Plant is a combined cycle gas-fired power plant in Al Manakher, Jordan. It was the first independent power plant in Jordan.

The plant is operated by AES Jordan PSC, a subsidiary of AES Corporation and Mitsui & Co. Construction started in 2007 and the plant was commissioned in 2009. The plant has an installed capacity of 380 MW and it cost US$300 million.

In 2011, it was announced that Qatar Electricity & Water Corporation will buy a stake in the power plant.
