= Kindiba =

Ancient iron extraction site located in Tougo, Yatenga, Burkina Faso

Kindiba is an ancient iron extraction site located in Tougo Department, Yatenga Province, Burkina Faso. The site consists of mines and three clay built furnaces.

== World Heritage Status ==
This site was added to the UNESCO World Heritage Tentative List on April 9, 1996, in the Cultural category.
