= Guangdong Yudean Group =

Chinese electric power company

Guangdong Yudean Group Co., Ltd.
- Trade name: Guangdong Energy Group Co., Ltd. (from 2019)
- Native name: 广东粤电集团有限公司
- Company type: State-owned enterprise
- Industry: Electric power
- Founded: August 8, 2001; 24 years ago
- Headquarters: Yuedian Square, No. 8–10 Tianhedong Road, Guangzhou, Guangdong, China
- Products: Coal power, hydropower, natural gas power, wind power, nuclear power, solar power
- Revenue: CN¥40 billion (2016)
- Total assets: CN¥130 billion (2016)
- Number of employees: >13,000
- Parent: Guangdong Provincial Government (76%); China Huaneng Group (24%)
- Subsidiaries: Guangdong Electric Power Development Co., Ltd. (listed subsidiary)
- Website: www.geg.com.cn

Guangdong Yudean Group Co., Ltd. (Chinese: 广东粤电集团有限公司; pinyin: Guǎngdōng Yuèdiàn Jítuán Yǒuxiàn Gōngsī), renamed Guangdong Energy Group Co., Ltd. (Chinese: 广东能源集团有限公司) in 2019, is a Chinese state-owned power generation company headquartered in Guangzhou, Guangdong. It is the largest power generation enterprise in Guangdong Province, with a controllable installed capacity exceeding 30 gigawatts (GW). The company is 76% owned by the People's Government of Guangdong Province and 24% by China Huaneng Group.

== History ==
The company traces its origins to the earliest days of electric power in Guangdong. In 1888, the first electric light in the province was lit in the Palace of the Governor-General of Guangdong and Guangxi. In 1890, patriotic overseas Chinese established China's first electric light company with national capital in Guangzhou.

On 8 August 2001, the Guangdong Provincial Government carried out reforms of the provincial electric power system, splitting the former Guangdong Electric Power Holding Co. into two entities: Guangdong Power Grid Corporation, responsible for electricity transmission and distribution, and Guangdong Yudean Group, which inherited the power generation business of the former Electric Power Group Company of Guangdong Province. The company was established with a registered capital of RMB 23 billion.

In 2019, the company was officially renamed Guangdong Energy Group Co., Ltd., with the approval of the State-owned Assets Supervision and Administration Commission of Guangdong Province and the Guangdong Provincial Market Supervision Administration. The renaming reflected a broader strategic orientation toward diversified energy operations beyond electricity generation.

== Operations ==
=== Power generation ===
The company's core businesses encompass coal-fired power, hydropower, natural gas-fired power, wind power, nuclear power, and solar power generation. By the end of 2016, the company had a controllable installed capacity of approximately 30 GW, total assets of about RMB 130 billion, a controllable shipping capacity of 2.41 million deadweight tons, and annual operating revenue exceeding RMB 40 billion. The group operated 35 subordinate power plants, of which 15 were facilities with over one million kilowatts of capacity.

In 2024, the company started commercial operations at the Dongguan Ningzhou combined-cycle power facility in Guangdong, one of the largest gas-fired power stations in China. The plant was equipped with three GE Vernova 9HA.02 gas turbines and represented the regional transition from coal to natural gas generation. The Guangdong Huizhou combined-cycle power plant, a 1,340 MW facility powered by hydrogen-ready GE Vernova 9HA.01 gas turbines, also came online in the same period.

=== Nuclear power ===
Yudean Group holds equity stakes in several nuclear power projects in Guangdong Province:

- Taishan Nuclear Power Plant: In 2012, the company acquired a 19% share of the Taishan Nuclear Power Joint Venture Company Ltd from CGN. The remaining equity is held by CGN Power Co. (51%) and Électricité de France (30%). The Taishan plant houses two 1,750 MW EPR reactors, the first of which entered commercial operation in December 2018.
- Yangjiang Nuclear Power Station: The company holds a 17% stake in Yangjiang Nuclear Power Company Limited. The plant comprises six 1,080 MW CPR-1000 and ACPR-1000 pressurised water reactors, fully commissioned by 2019. The remaining shareholders include CGN group entities (66%) and CLP Holdings (17%).

=== Natural gas infrastructure ===
Guangdong Energy Group holds a 25% stake in Guangdong Zhuhai Golden Bay LNG Ltd., the operator of the Zhuhai LNG terminal on the western bank of the Pearl River Estuary. In 2024, the company started commercial operations at a newly constructed LNG receiving terminal in Huizhou, Guangdong, with an annual processing capacity of 4 million tonnes. US energy company ExxonMobil secured a 20-year agreement to handle 1.8 million tonnes every year through the facility. Guangdong Energy also signed a 10-year contract with QatarEnergy for 1 million tonnes per annum of LNG supply.

== International investments ==
=== InterGen ===
Yudean Group jointly holds a 50% stake in InterGen, an international independent power producer, through Overseas International Industrial Company Ltd, a joint venture with China Huaneng Group. The other 50% was formerly held by Ontario Teachers' Pension Plan and later by Sev.en Energy. The consortium of Huaneng and Yudean acquired the 50% InterGen stake from India's GMR Group in 2011 for US$1.232 billion. Through InterGen, the group has had operational interests in gas-fired power stations in the United Kingdom, the Netherlands, Mexico, and Australia.

== Listed subsidiary ==
The company's principal listed subsidiary is Guangdong Electric Power Development Co., Ltd. (Chinese: 广东电力发展股份有限公司), commonly known as Yue Power or GED.
