= Wuhan Iron and Steel Company Limited =

Former Chinese listed company

- Type: Subsidiary
- Traded as: SSE: 600005 (former code)
- Industry: Iron and steel
- Founded: 1955 (predecessor); 1997 (incorporation)
- Headquarters: Wuhan, China
- Area served: China
- Revenue: ▼CN¥58.338 billion (2015)
- Operating income: ▼ (CN¥7.935 billion) (2015)
- Net income: ▼ (CN¥7.515 billion) (2015)
- Total assets: ▼CN¥94.456 billion (2015)
- Total equity: ▼CN¥28.291 billion (2015)
- Owner: Baoshan Iron & Steel (100%)
Parent
Baoshan Iron & Steel	(direct)
Baowu Steel Group	(intermediate)
SASAC	(intermediate)
State Council	(ultimate)
- Website: wggf.wisco.com.cn

Wuhan Iron and Steel Company Limited
- Simplified Chinese: 武汉钢铁有限公司
- Traditional Chinese: 武漢鋼鐵有限公司
- Hanyu Pinyin: Wǔhàn gāngtiě yǒuxiàn gōngsī
Transcriptions
Standard Mandarin
- Hanyu Pinyin: Wǔhàn gāngtiě yǒuxiàn gōngsī

Alternative Chinese name
- Simplified Chinese: 武钢有限
- Traditional Chinese: 武鋼有限
- Hanyu Pinyin: Wǔgāng yǒuxiàn
- Literal meaning: Wu[han] Steel Limited
Transcriptions
Standard Mandarin
- Hanyu Pinyin: Wǔgāng yǒuxiàn

Second alternative Chinese name
- Simplified Chinese: 武钢股份
- Hanyu Pinyin: Wǔgāng gǔfèn
Transcriptions
Standard Mandarin
- Hanyu Pinyin: Wǔgāng gǔfèn

Wuhan Iron and Steel Company Limited known as WISCO (and formerly WGGF, abb. of pinyin: Wǔgāng gǔfèn), is a subsidiary of listed steel maker Baoshan Iron and Steel; Wuhan Iron and Steel Co., Ltd. was a subsidiary of state-owned Wuhan Iron and Steel Corporation until 2016. The main business was the steel plant in Qingshan District, Wuhan, while the parent company had transformed from steel making company to holding company and M&A vehicle.

On 21–22 September 2016, a merger between Baosteel Group and Wuhan Iron and Steel Corporation was announced. Wuhan Iron and Steel Company Limited would be takeover by the listed counterpart of Baosteel Group in an all-share deal, while all the rights of Wuhan Iron and Steel Corporation would be transferred to Baosteel Group, as both corporations were supervised by the same entity State-owned Assets Supervision and Administration Commission of the State Council.

On 7 July 2016, after a heavy net loss in 2015, Wuhan Iron and Steel Corporation also announced the group would reduce their production capacity by 4.42 million metric tons, which Wuhan Iron and Steel Co Ltd would be cut 1.40 million metric tons, or about 31.7% of the group total.

== Stock market ==
Wuhan Iron and Steel Co., Ltd. was a component of SSE 50 Index, which was removed in 2011.

The company was a component CSI 300 Index and its sub-index CSI 100 Index, which was removed from both indexes in 2013. In 2015, the company was re-added to CSI 300 Index.
