= Baogang Tailings Dam =

Dam in Baotou, Inner Mongolia, China

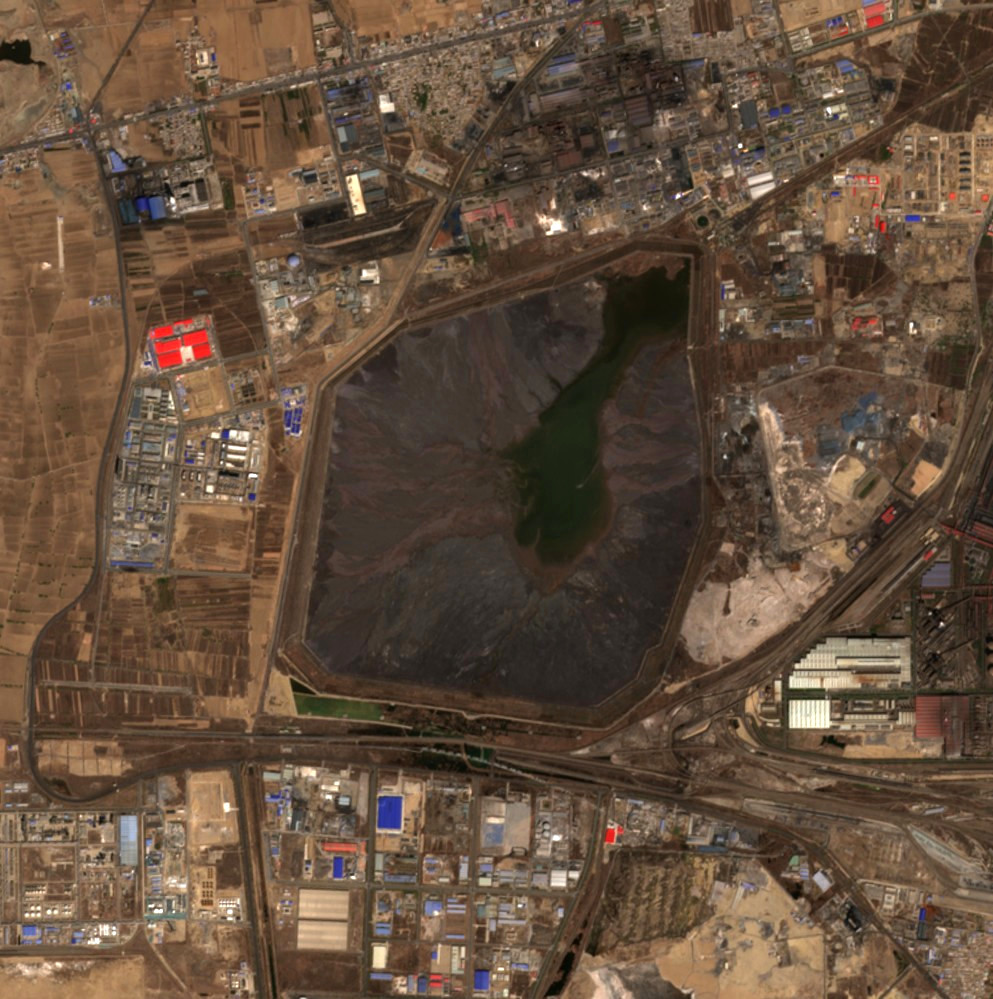

- Location within China
- Location: Baotou
- Coordinates: 40°38′16.3″N 109°41′16.7″E
- Construction began: 1955
- Opening date: 1965
- Owner: Baotou Steel

Dam and spillways
- Type of dam: Embankment, tailings
- Height: 6 m (20 ft)
- Length: 11.5 km (7.1 mi)
- Elevation at crest: 1,045 m (3,428 ft)

Reservoir
- Total capacity: 85,000,000 m^{3} (69,000 acre⋅ft)
- Active capacity: 68,800,000 m^{3} (55,800 acre⋅ft)
- Surface area: 10 km^{2} (3.9 mi^{2})

Baogang Tailings Dam, also known as the Baotou Tailings Dam or Weikuang Dam, is a tailings dam in Inner Mongolia, China, on the outer ring of the city of Baotou, about 20 kilometres from the city centre. The dam is filled with tailings and waste slurry from nearby rare earth mineral refinery plants. Accounts of the tailings dam appeared in western media outlets after a visit in 2015 by British writers Tim Maughan, Liam Young and Kate Davies from Unknown Fields, a "nomadic design studio" from London. Footage posted on YouTube by Maughan appears to show him collecting samples from the floor of the dam. Maughan's account contrasts with the Chinese media's own reporting of the rare earth industry in the area. In 2016, Chinese authorities identified contamination of farmlands surrounding the dam. In recent years, the government has engaged in environmental cleanup efforts at the site. However, raised earth embankments around the dam, along with a concrete wall, make it inaccessible to the public.

Construction of the dam began in 1955, and it was complete in 1963 but was not used until 1965. It is owned by Baotou Steel. The circular dam is 11.5 km (7.1 mi) long and has a 85,000,000 m^{3} (69,000 acre⋅ft) capacity. The dam height will be raised a total of 20 m (66 ft) in two stages to a crest elevation of 1,065 m (3,494 ft), and the final capacity will be 233,800,000 m^{3} (189,500 acre⋅ft).

Bayan Obo Mining District, about 120 kilometres from Baotou city is the world's biggest supplier of rare earth minerals. They are used in the production of smartphones, tablets and other technology, like wind turbines. Production creates millions of tons of waste per year which has drawn much criticism of the dam. Chemicals in the dam have been linked to lower crop yields in surrounding farmlands and serious health problems among local villagers.
