= Guangdong Holdings =

Chinese company

- Company type: state-owned enterprise
Founded
3 June 1980	(as Guangdong Enterprises)
31 January 2000	(as Guangdong Holdings)
- Founder: Guangdong Government
- Headquarters: Guangzhou, Guangdong, China
- Area served: Mainland China, Hong Kong
- Key people: Huang Xiaofeng (Chairman)
- Revenue: ▲CN¥15.656 billion (2016)
- Operating income: ▼CN¥4.275 billion (2016)
- Net income: ▼CN¥1.352 billion (2016)
- Total assets: ▲CN¥85.149 billion (2016)
- Total equity: ▲CN¥30.682 billion (2016)
- Owner: Guangdong Government (100%)
Parent
Guangdong's SASAC	(direct)
Guangdong Government	(ultimate)
Subsidiaries
GDH Limited	(100.0%)
Guangdong Trust	(100.0%)
Guangdong Investment	(54.68%)
- Website: gdh.com.hk
- Footnotes / references in a consolidated financial statement

Guangdong Holdings Limited
- Simplified Chinese: 广东粤海控股集团
- Traditional Chinese: 廣東粵海控股集團
Transcriptions

Alternative Chinese name
- Simplified Chinese: 粤海控股
- Traditional Chinese: 粵海控股
Transcriptions

Guangdong Holdings Limited is a Chinese holding company. Guangdong Holdings is the parent company of Hong Kong incorporated GDH Limited (Chinese: 粤海控股集团), in turn it was the parent company of listed companies Guangdong Investment (SEHK: 270), Guangnan Holdings (SEHK: 1203), Guangdong Tannery (SEHK: 1058) and Guangdong Land Holdings (SEHK: 124). In additional Huajin Technology was traded in Chinese OTC market (NEEQ: 870031). Guangdong Holdings itself was owned by Guangdong Provincial People's Government.

== History ==
=== Guangdong Enterprises ===
The predecessor of Guangdong Holdings, was a company incorporated on 3 June 1980 as Guangdong Enterprises Limited (Chinese: 粤海企业有限公司), a company incorporated in Hong Kong, as a "window company" of the mainland China (more precisely, the Guangdong Province) to trade with the outside world. In 1985 Guangdong Enterprises was renamed to Guangdong Enterprises (Holdings) Limited (Chinese: 粤海企业(集团)有限公司). In 1988 Guangdong Enterprises acquired a listed company (SEHK: 270) as a special purpose vehicle that Guangdong Enterprises backdoor listing its assets.

=== Guangdong Holdings ===
The group suffered as a result of the 1997 Asian financial crisis; in 1999 a debt restructuring plan was agreed. The group received more assets from Guangdong Government as capital injection, most notably Dongshen Water Supply Project, an infrastructure that supply water from the upper stream of Dong River to Hong Kong via Shenzhen. More specifically, listed subsidiary Guangdong Investment acquired 81% stake of Cayman Islands incorporated "GH Water Supply (Holdings) Limited" in December 1999, the parent company of Dongshen Water Supply Project from Guangdong Government in an all-share deal (increased from 38.90% at 31 December 1999 to 55.49% at 31 December 2000), plus the government paid Guangdong Investment US$20 million. The agreed maximum volume of water that Hong Kong would buy in 1999 was 770 million cubic metre (actual supplied 738 million m^{3}) In 1999 the agreed price was HK$3.085/m^{3}.

On 10 December 1999 a new holding company for the group's overseas subsidiaries was incorporated in Hong Kong as GDH Limited (Chinese: 广东控股; lit. 'Guangdong Holdings'). The Chinese name of GDH Limited was renamed on 8 July 2006 (Chinese: 粤海控股集团; lit. 'Guangdong Overseas Holding Group').

The ultimate holding company, Guangdong Yue Gang Investment Holdings (Chinese: 广东粤港投资控股; lit. 'Guangdong Guangdong-Hongkong Investment Holdings Co.', 'Ltd.') was incorporated in the mainland China on 31 January 2000. The company was later renamed to Guangdong Holdings Limited (Chinese: 广东粤海控股; lit. 'Guangdong Guangdong Overseas Holding') . In 2015 the Chinese name of the company was added the word "group" (Chinese: 广东粤海控股集团; lit. 'Guangdong Guangdong Overseas Holding Group'), making Guangdong Holdings Limited had almost the same Chinese name with GDH Limited.

== Subsidiaries ==
- GDH Limited (100%)
  - Guangdong Assets Management (100%)
  - Guangdong Trust (100%)
  - Guangdong Alliance Limited
  - Guangdong Investment (54.68%)

== See also ==
- Guangdong Hengjian Investment Holding
- Guangdong Provincial Railway Construction Investment Group
- Guangdong Rising Asset Management
