= Meishan Iron and Steel =

Chinese iron and steel manufacturing company

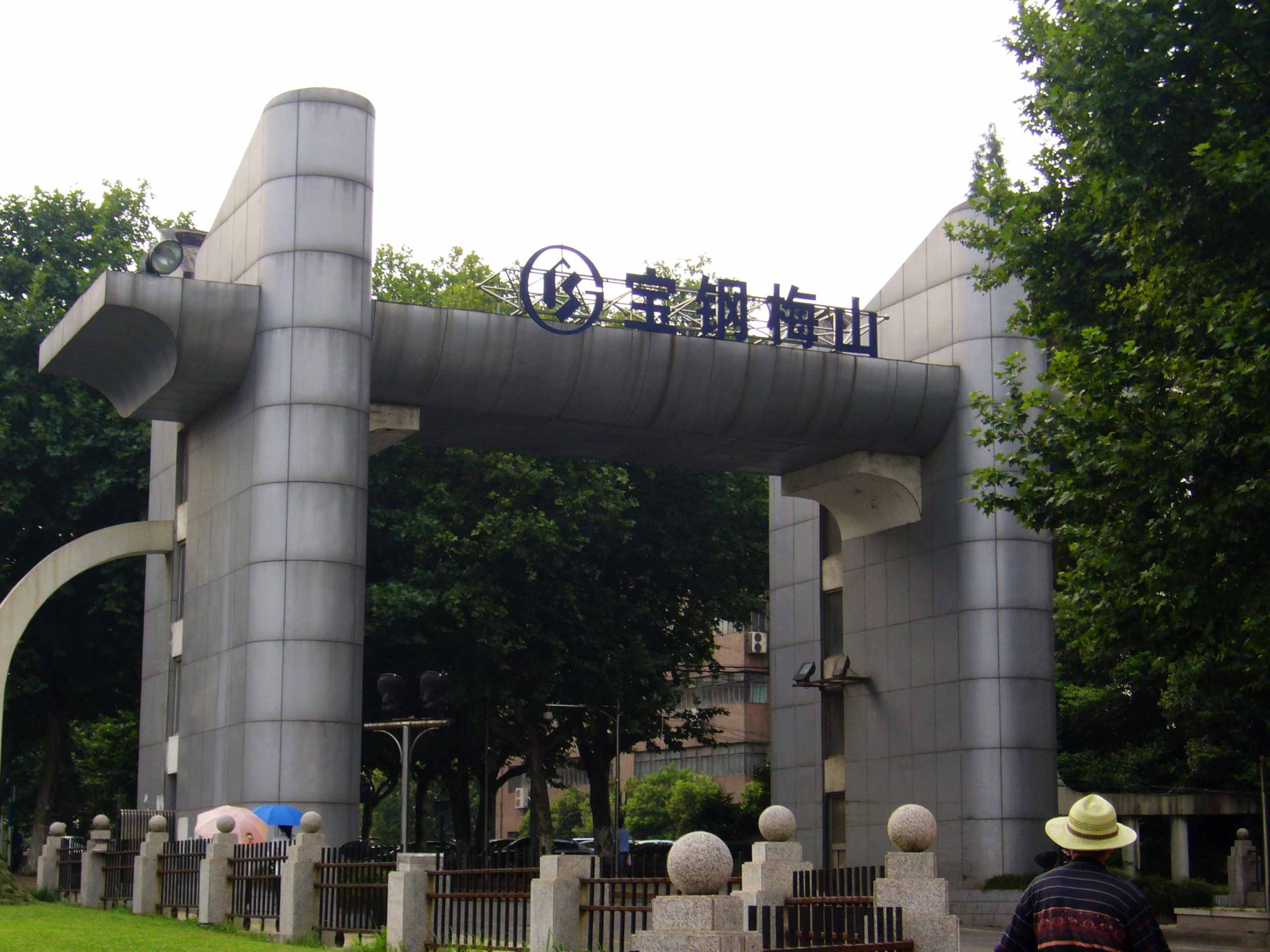
- Type: Company limited by shares, subsidiary
- Industry: Iron and steel manufacturing
- Founded: 28 June 1990 (as company); 26 June 2001 (as limited company)
- Founder: Shanghai Meishan Group
- Headquarters: Nanjing, China
- Revenue: ▼CN¥26.0 billion (2014)
- Operating income: ▲CN¥193 million (2014)
- Net income: ▲CN¥7.00 million (2014)
- Total assets: ▼CN¥32.9 billion (2014)
- Total equity: CN¥11.1 billion (2014)
- Owner: Baoshan Iron and Steel (77.0%); China Development Bank; Orient Asset Management; Government of Nanjing City
- Parent: Baoshan Iron and Steel
- Footnotes in a consolidated basis

Shanghai Meishan Iron and Steel Co., Ltd.
- Simplified Chinese: 上海梅山钢铁股份有限公司
- Traditional Chinese: 上海梅山鋼鐵股份有限公司
- Literal meaning: Shanghai Meishan Steel and Iron Company Limited by Shares
Transcriptions
Standard Mandarin
- Hanyu Pinyin: Shànghǎi méishān gāngtiě gǔfèn yǒuxiàn gōngsī

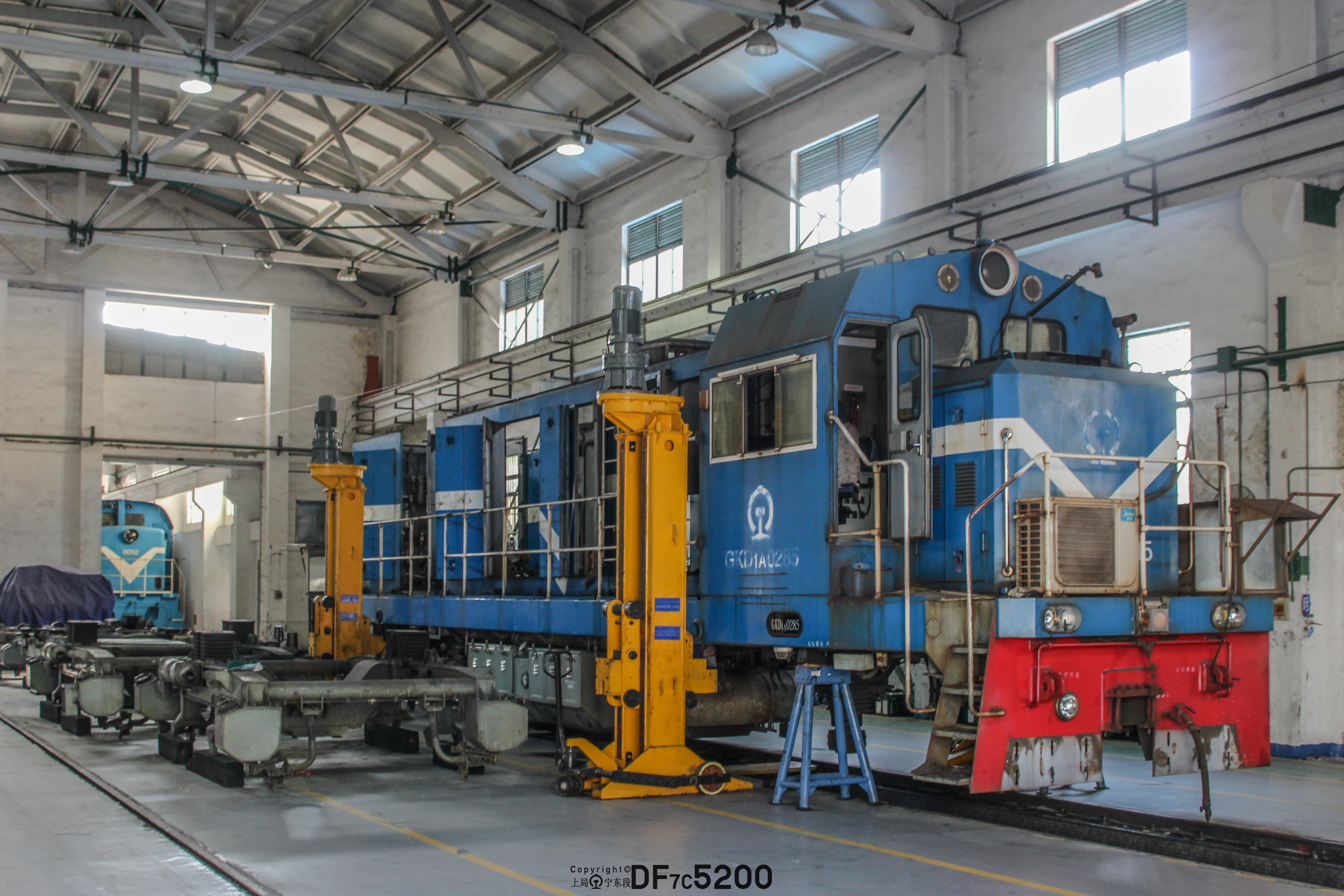
Shunting locomotive GKD1A owned by Meisteel.

Shanghai Meishan Iron and Steel Co., Ltd., known as Meishan Iron and Steel, or Meisteel or Meigang (Chinese: 梅钢) is a second-tier subsidiary of Baowu (formerly known as Baosteel Group) and a first-tier subsidiary of listed company Baoshan Iron and Steel Co., Ltd. (Baosteel). The company was based in Nanjing.

In 2004, Baosteel Group decided to inject Shanghai Meishan Iron and Steel Co., Ltd. to fellow subsidiary Baoshan Iron and Steel Co., Ltd., which is also a listed company.

== History ==
=== Meishan Iron & Steel ===
The steel plant at Meishan Iron Mine, in Yuhuatai District, Nanjing was founded in 1969 by the Shanghai Government. The mine became a quasi-exclave of Shanghai. In 1984, the steel plant and related industries became Shanghai Meishan Metallurgical Corporation (Chinese: 上海梅山冶金公司). The company was registered in the Government of Nanjing in 1990.

In 1994, a new holding company was formed for Meishan Group, which the mine was spin-off from Meishan Metallurgical Corporation in 1995, while the iron and steel company became Shanghai Meishan Iron and Steel Co., Ltd. (Chinese: 梅山钢铁有限公司).

The company became a subsidiary of Baosteel Group in 1998. Meishan Iron and Steel was listed as one of the 512 most important state-owned enterprises in 1997, in the iron and steel industry segment that consist of 47 companies.

The company was re-incorporated in 2001 (Chinese: 上海梅山钢铁股份有限公司) by debt-to-equity swap. In 2004, Baosteel Group floated Meishan Iron & Steel at Shanghai Stock Exchange by selling 74.01% shares of Meishan Iron & Steel to its listed subsidiary Baoshan Iron and Steel, for a valuation of CN¥5.469 billion (CN¥7.389 billion total value times 74.01% shares). The deal was completed in 2005.

In 2008, Meishan Iron & Steel signed a contract with Praxair to build two more new air separation plants in Meishan.

In 2018, it was announced that the steel plant of the company would be relocated to Yancheng, Jiangsu Province in the 2020s.

=== Former Shanghai Meishan Group ===
"Shanghai Meishan (Group) Co., Ltd." (Chinese: 上海梅山(集团)有限公司) was the holding company of Meishan Iron & Steel and other subsidiaries. It was founded in 1994. Meishan Group merged with Baosteel Group in 1998. The assets of Meishan Group were absorbed by "Baosteel Group Shanghai Meishan Co., Ltd." (Chinese: 宝钢集团上海梅山有限公司) some time later. After the partial demerger in 2004, Baosteel Group Shanghai Meishan Ltd. still owned Shanghai Meishan Mining (Chinese: 上海梅山矿业有限公司, incorporated in 1995) the mining company in the unlisted portion of the conglomerate. The company became part of "Nanjing Meishan Metallurgical Development" (Chinese: 南京梅山冶金发展有限公司), a subsidiary of "Baosteel Group Shanghai Meishan Co., Ltd." in 2010. As of 31 December 2015, "Baosteel Group Shanghai Meishan Co., Ltd." had net assets of just CN¥1.366 billion, much smaller in size than its sister company Meishan Iron and Steel.

== Shareholders ==
As of 31 December 2014

- Baoshan Iron and Steel (77.04%)
- a wholly owned subsidiary of China Development Bank (9.14%)
- China Orient Asset Management (7.02%)
- a subsidiary of the Government of Nanjing (6.80%)

== Data ==
Year	Turnover	Result	Total Assets	Net Assets
as Shanghai Meishan Group
1994	¥2.1 billion	¥170.7 million	¥4.2 billion	¥1.7 billion
1995
1996
as Meishan Iron and Steel (in a consolidated basis)
2003	¥6.0 billion	¥585.0 million	¥11.6 billion	¥6.1 billion
2004
2005
2006
2007	¥13.0 billion	¥1.1 billion	¥13.9 billion	¥11.2 billion
2008	▲¥14.3 billion	▼¥0.3 billion	▲¥20.3 billion	▲11.5 billion
