= Baowu =

Chinese iron and steel company

China Baowu Steel Group

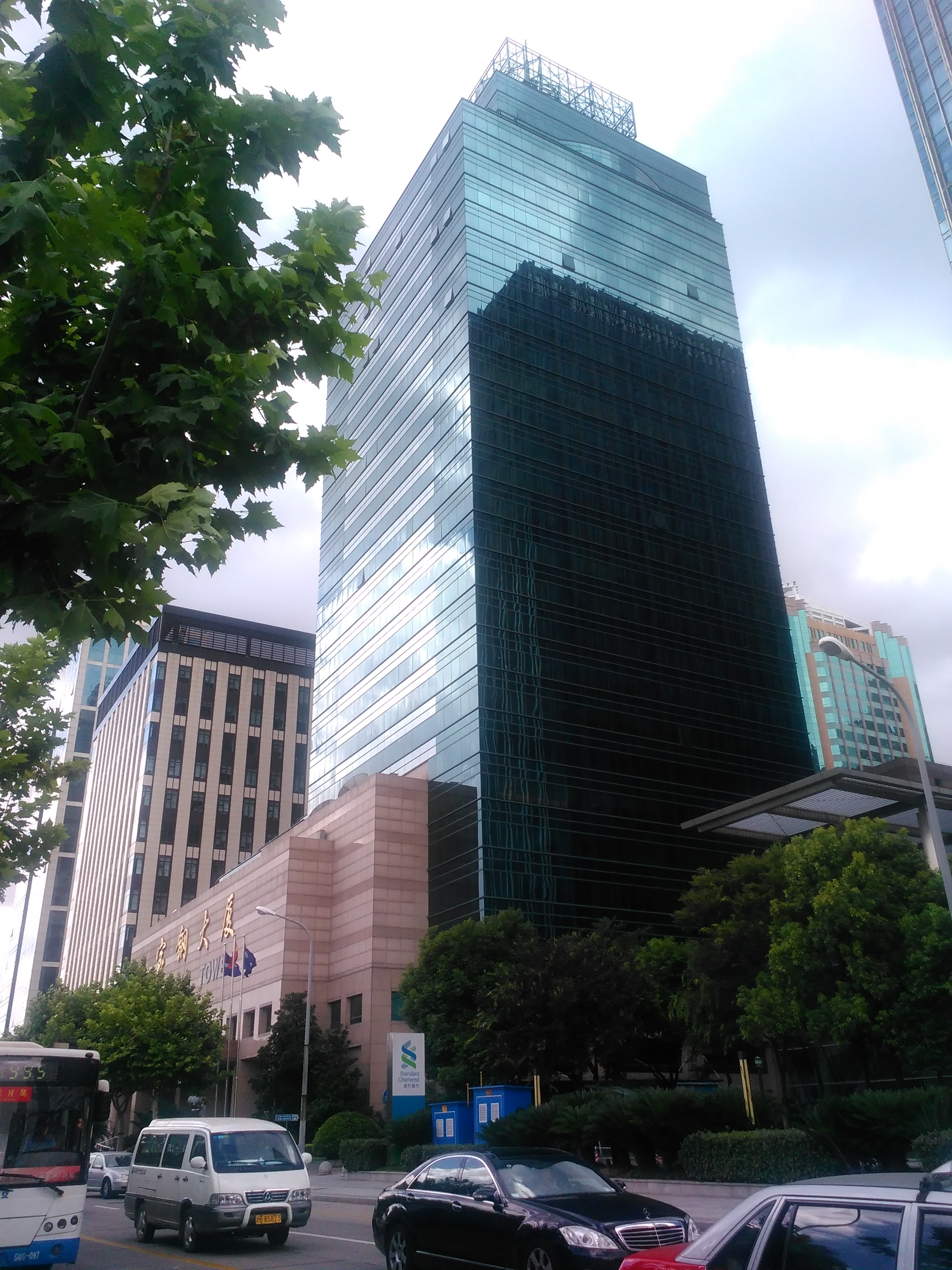
- The headquarters, Baosteel Tower in Pudong, Shanghai
- Type: State-owned enterprise
- Industry: Steel
- Predecessor: Shanghai Baosteel Group Corporation; Wuhan Iron and Steel Corporation
- Founded: 1978; 48 years ago
- Headquarters: Shanghai, China
- Key people: Hu Wangming (Chairman)
- Products: Steel, flat steel products, long steel products, wire products, plates
- Revenue: US$157.216 billion (2023)
- Net income: US$2.494 billion (2023)
- Total assets: US$191.964 billion (2023)
- Owner: Chinese Central Government (100%)
- Number of employees: 382,894 (2023)
- Parent: State-owned Assets Supervision and Administration Commission of the State Council
- Subsidiaries: see list
- Website: www.baowugroup.com

China Baowu Steel Group Corporation Limited
- Simplified Chinese: 中国宝武钢铁集团有限公司
- Traditional Chinese: 中國寶武鋼鉄集團有限公司
- Literal meaning: China Baowu Steel Group Limited [Liability] Corporation
Transcriptions
Standard Mandarin
- Hanyu Pinyin: Zhōngguó Bǎowǔ Gāngtiě Jítuán yǒuxiàn Gōngsī

Baowu
- Simplified Chinese: 宝武
- Traditional Chinese: 寶武
- Literal meaning: Baoshan & Wuhan
Transcriptions
Standard Mandarin
- Hanyu Pinyin: Bǎowǔ

China Baowu Steel Group Corp., Ltd., commonly known as Baowu, is a state-owned iron and steel company headquartered in the Baosteel Tower in Pudong, Shanghai, China. The company was formed by Baosteel Group absorbing its smaller state-owned peer, Wuhan Iron and Steel Corporation in 2016. It is the world's largest steel producer.

In 2015, Baowu was the second largest steel producer in the world measured by crude steel output, with an annual output of around 35 million tons (China's total steel production in 2015 was 803.8 million tons), and employed 130,401 employees as of the end of 2012, had annual revenues of around $21.5 billion, and produces a mix of products. In 2019, the company closed the gap with ArcelorMittal reaching 95.47 million tons of steel, and hitting $78 billion in revenues, with 195,434 employees.

According to World Steel Association (Chinese companies data were provided by China Iron and Steel Association), the corporation was ranked the 5th in 2015 the world ranking by production volume (2nd in China for 34.938 million metric tons). A plan to merge with Wuhan Iron and Steel Corporation was announced on 21–22 September 2016, which would make the combined production volume the second highest in the world (34.938 million + 25.776 million), after ArcelorMittal (97.136 million in 2015), surpassing Hesteel Group (47.745 million in 2015). Since Baosteel Group and Wuhan Iron and Steel Corporation also announced targets of cutting 3.95 and 4.42 million metric tons production capacity respectively in June and July 2016, and a further cut for Baosteel Group of 2.10 million while a 3.15 million cut was already planned the final ranking may still significantly change.

The IPO of the subsidiary of Baosteel Group on the Shanghai Stock Exchange in 2000 was the largest in China up to that time, raising CNY 7.7 billion despite being limited to domestic investors only.

== History ==
=== Baoshan Iron and Steel ===
In 1978, as part of the Chinese government's reform and opening, Chinese paramount leader Deng Xiaoping sought to develop large-scale steel production in China. The government planned for a large integrated steel production facility to be located near the port of Shanghai, in Baoshan District, a suburb of Shanghai. In 1978, a delegation from the Chinese government, including Deng Xiaoping himself, visited a steel mill operated by Nippon Steel to learn how to construct such a large facility. As the government's flagship steel company, Baoshan Iron and Steel (Baogang) as it was originally called, benefitted from acquiring the engineers and managers, access to technology, and receiving government contracts.

Initially, the firm limited its exports to just 10% of steel production, hoping to fulfill domestic demand. Baoshan Iron and Steel served the light industry base around Shanghai.

In the 1980s, Baoshan Iron and Steel supplanted Angang as China's largest steel producer.

Baoshan Iron and Steel also benefitted from the Chinese economic expansion which consumed all the steel available. However, with the continuing liberalization of the Chinese economy, Baoshan found itself in competition with new rivals, both foreign and domestic. By the late 1990s, the company removed its cap on steel exports; it scored notable success in South Korea. Although hurt by the Asian financial crisis, Baoshan pushed through with a merger of other money losing state owned enterprises, though it had managed to remain profitable itself.

=== Baosteel Group ===
Through the policy of grasping the large, letting go of the small, the company was among the large state-owned enterprises to be strengthened through mergers and government support, with the goal of turning it into a national champion. On November 17, 1998, the former Baoshan Iron and Steel (Group) Corporation absorbed the Shanghai Metallurgical Holding Group Corporation (上海冶金控股集团公司) and the Shanghai Meishan Group (上海梅山集团公司) to form Shanghai Baosteel Group Corporation. The new conglomerate was the largest steel producer in the country with annual steel production of nearly 20 million tons. Since then, the strategy of Baosteel Group has been to expand production capacity in iron and steel, achieve vertical integration along the value chain, and acquire related industries.

In 1997, a subsidiary of Shanghai Metallurgical Holding, the former Shanghai No.3 Iron and Steel Plant, Shanghai Pudong Iron and Steel, formed a joint venture with ThyssenKrupp of Germany, as Shanghai Krupp Stainless. It followed the parent company to become a subsidiary of Baosteel Group in 1998.

In 2000, a subsidiary Baoshan Iron & Steel Co., Ltd. was formed to list a portion of the group on the Shanghai Stock Exchange, while Shanghai No.1st, 2, 3 and 5 Iron and Steel Plants of the group were remaining unlisted. In 2004, the listed subsidiary acquired Meishan Iron and Steel from Baosteel Group (via Shanghai Meishan Group).

Baosteel took over the benchmark negotiations in the global iron ore market in 2006. At that time, the global iron ore market had been subject to a benchmark pricing regime set by the three largest producers (Rio Tinto, Vale S.A., and BHP Billiton) and the largest importer (which had been Japanese importers prior to 2006). In 2009, it was replaced as the lead negotiator by China Iron and Steel Association. The benchmark pricing system ended in 2010.

In 2007 Baosteel Group acquired the majority stake of Xinjiang Ba Yi Iron and Steel Group, which was the parent company of Ba Yi Iron and Steel [Company Limited by Shares].

In 2008 Baosteel Group expended in Southern China, which planned to build a new facility in Zhanjiang, Guangdong, which formally started by its subsidiary Baoshan Iron & Steel in 2012, by acquiring 71.8032% stake of Zhanjiang Iron and Steel for CNY4.976 billion from State-owned Assets Supervision and Administration Commission of Guangzhou City.

In 2011, Baosteel Group acquired 51% stake of Guangdong Shaoguan Iron and Steel Group from SASAC of Guangdong Government. In April 2012, Shaoguan Iron and Steel Co, Ltd. was established.

Boasteel owns the 85% of held resources company Aquila Resources Pty Ltd, through Baosteel Resources.

Boasteel developed a sales and distribution network in China and foreign countries. Boasteel overseas subsidiaries controls key minerals resources for steel production, such as the Majishan ore terminal in the port of Zhoushan. Baosteel also invested in steel-related industries such as Baoxin Software and Baosteel Chemical.

=== Baowu ===
On 21–22 September 2016, a plan to merge Baosteel Group and fellow state-owned steel maker Wuhan Iron and Steel Corporation was announced. Baoshan Iron and Steel Company Limited, the listed portion of Baosteel Group would takeover the counterpart Wuhan Iron and Steel Company Limited in an all-share deal, while the rights of Wuhan Iron and Steel Corporation would be transferred to Baosteel Group for free as a wholly owned subsidiary. Both Baosteel Group and Wuhan Iron and Steel Corporation were supervised by SASAC of the Central Government. As of December 2016, the name of the new group is China Baowu Steel Group Corporation. It is now the second largest steel producer in the world, with assets estimated to be worth around 730 billion Yuan, employing 228,000 employees and expected annual sales revenues of 330 billion Yuan ($47.9 billion).

In early 2016, Baosteel Group was accused by US Steel Corp. of stealing commercial secrets. Baosteel rejected these allegations, stating that "In particular, the charges claiming that Baosteel stole commercial secrets from U.S. Steel is rootless speculation and subjective assumption, and could even be described as an absurd statement". The United States International Trade Commission launched a probe into these allegations in May 2016. Next to Baosteel, Hebei Iron and Steel Group, Wuhan Iron and Steel Co., Ltd., Maanshan Iron and Steel Company Limited, Anshan Iron and Steel Group and Jiangsu Shagang Group are also under investigation. In February 2017, US Steel dropped the claim of trade secret theft because of a lack of evidence, and in October 2017, the United States International Trade Commission dismissed the anti-circumvention allegation. In March 2018, it additionally dismissed the antitrust claims, again because of a lack of evidence, and ended the investigation.

In 2019, China Baowu Steel Group acquired 51% stake of Masteel Group from the SASAC of Anhui Provincial People's Government for free. The acquisition also included the indirect controlling stake of the list company Maanshan Iron and Steel Company Limited.

By 2020 the company had become the largest steel manufacturer in the world by volume.

In 2022, Baowu acquired fellow state-owned enterprise Sinosteel.

== Subsidiaries ==
- Steel plants
  - Baoshan Iron and Steel (SSE: 600019)
    - Baosight Software
    - Shanghai Meishan Iron and Steel (77.04%)
    - Wuhan Iron and Steel Company (100%)
    - Zhanjiang Iron and Steel
  - Shanghai First Iron and Steel Co., Ltd.
  - Shanghai Second Iron and Steel Co., Ltd.
  - Shanghai Pudong Iron and Steel Co., Ltd.
  - Shanghai Fifth Iron and Steel Co., Ltd.
  - Guangdong Shaoguan Iron and Steel (51%)
    - SGIS Songshan Co., Ltd. (53.37%, SZSE: 000717)
  - Wuhan Iron and Steel Corporation (100%)
    - Guangxi Iron and Steel Group (100%)
  - Xinjiang Ba Yi Iron and Steel Group (76.93%)
    - Xinjiang Ba Yi Iron and Steel (50.02%, SSE: 600581)
- Mining conglomerate
  - Shanghai Meishan Co., Ltd. (100%)
  - Sinosteel (100%)
  - Tibet Mineral Development
- Financial companies
  - Hwabao Investment (100%)
  - Fortune Investment (100%)
- Others
  - Guangdong Iron and Steel Group (100%)

== Equity investments ==
Baosteel Group was a minority owner of Metallurgical Corporation of China Limited for 0.65% (as of 30 June 2010). Excluding the investment held by the listed subsidiary Baoshan Iron and Steel, Baosteel Group owned 0.88% stake (via Hwabao Investment) in PetroChina Pipelines, the company that runs West–East Gas Pipeline.

Baosteel Group, as of 31 December 2015, still owned 15.11% stake in New China Life Insurance, a listed company in both Hong Kong and Shanghai Stock Exchange, as well as China Bohai Bank for 11.67% stake, China Pacific Insurance for 14.17% stake.
