= Wuhan Iron and Steel Corporation =

Chinese state-owned steel making conglomerate

- Trade name: WISCO
- Formerly: Wuhan Iron and Steel Corporation
- Type: Subsidiary of State-owned enterprise
- Industry: Iron and steel
- Founded: 1955
- Headquarters: Wuhan, Hubei, China
- Area served: China
- Key people: Liu Xiang (Chairman and Party Committee Secretary)
- Revenue: ▼CN¥77.341 billion (2016)
- Operating income: ▲ (CN¥1.758 billion) (2016)
- Net income: ▲ (CN¥1.076 billion) (2016)
- Total assets: ▼CN¥176.567 billion (2016)
- Total equity: ▲CN¥27.070 billion (2016)
- Owner: Baowu Steel Group (100%)
- Parent: Baowu Steel Group
- Subsidiaries: Echeng Iron and Steel; Guangxi Iron and Steel
- Website: www.wuganggroup.cn

Wuhan Iron and Steel (Group) Corporation
- Simplified Chinese: 武汉钢铁(集团)公司
- Traditional Chinese: 武漢鋼鐵(集團)公司
Transcriptions
Standard Mandarin
- Hanyu Pinyin: Wǔhàn gāngtiě (jítuán) gōngsī

Wuhan Iron and Steel Corporation (WISCO) is a Chinese state-owned enterprise. It started to operate in 1958 in Qingshan, Wuhan, Hubei, China.

It was administered by State-owned Assets Supervision and Administration Commission of the State Council (SASAC), but in 2016 it was merged with fellow SASAC supervised steel maker Baosteel Group.

According to the World Steel Association (Chinese companies data was provided by China Iron and Steel Association), the corporation was ranked the 11th in 2015 the world ranking by production volume. However, after a heavy net loss in 2015, a plan to cut the production capacity in Qingshan plant, Wuhan, in Echeng plant, Ezhou as well as in Xiangyang plant for a total of 4.42 million metric tonnes, was announced on 7 July 2016.

== History ==
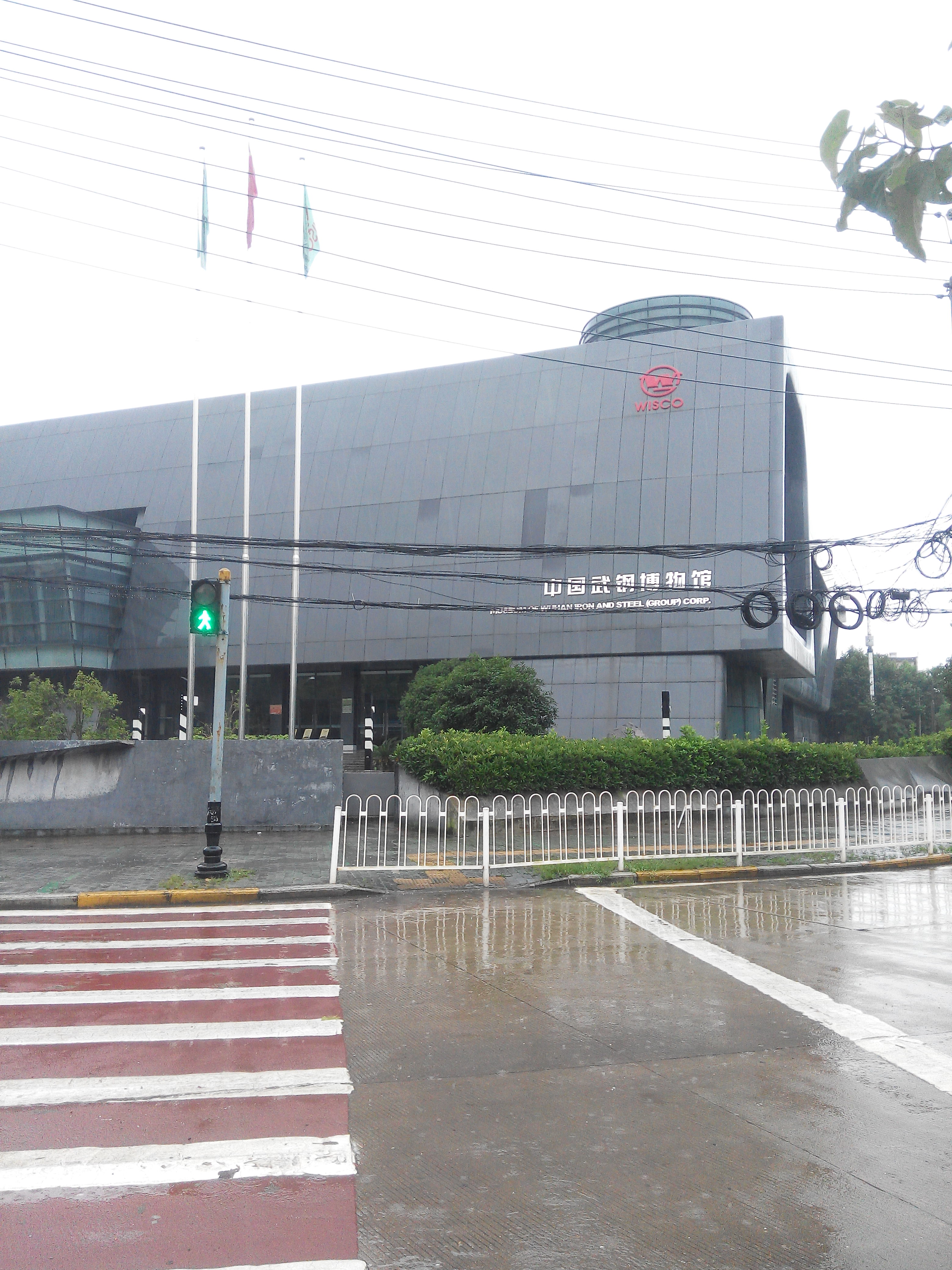
Museum of Wuhan Iron and Steel (Group) Corp.

The steel plant in Qingshan, was one of the 156 important construction projects of the First Five-year plan of China.

In 1997, a subsidiary, Wuhan Iron and Steel Co., Ltd. was incorporated to listed Qingshan steel plant in Shanghai Stock Exchange, while Wuhan Iron and Steel Group was transformed into a holding company, which acquired steel plants in Ezhou, Hubei Province, and in Liuzhou, Guangxi Province (sold back to SASAC of Guangxi Province in 2015) and build a new plant in Fang-cheng-gang, Guangxi Province.

In September 2012 Wuhan Iron and Steel Corporation agreed to acquire the automotive components manufacturer Tailored Blanks from ThyssenKrupp for an undisclosed price. At the time of the agreement Tailored Blanks had annual sales of around 700 million euros and a global market share of about 40 percent in automotive laser-welded blanks.

Its executive chairman, Deng Qilin, was investigated for corruption in 2015. New chairman, Ma Guoqiang, who replaced Deng Qilin in June 2015, had announced a plan to cut 50,000 staff from their current 80,000.

On 21–22 September 2016 the merger plan between Wuhan Iron and Steel Corporation and Baosteel Group was announced. The listed subsidiary, Wuhan Iron and Steel Company, would be taken over by the listed counterpart of Baosteel in an all-share deal, while the rights of unlisted Wuhan Iron and Steel Corporation would be transferred to Baosteel Group for free, as both were supervised by the same entity, the State-owned Assets Supervision and Administration Commission of the State Council. The merger of the two parent company was completed in November 2016 and the merger of the two listed subsidiaries was completed in February 2017. Ma Guoqiang, was also promoted back to the new parent company China Baowu Steel Group as chairman of the board of directors and the Secretary of the Party Committee. Ma's position in WISCO was replaced by Liu Xiang, the former Deputy General Manager of WISCO. Liu was also appointed as the Deputy General Manager of China Baowu Steel Group, on top of his position as the highest-ranking officials of WISCO.
