= Baotou Steel =

Iron and steel state-owned enterprise in Inner Mongolia, China

Baotou Iron and Steel Group Company Limited
- Native name: 包头钢铁集团有限公司
- Type: State-owned enterprise
- Industry: Steel manufacturing
- Founded: 1954
- Headquarters: Baotou, Inner Mongolia, China
- Area served: People's Republic of China
- Key people: Chairman and Party Committee Secretary: Mr. Cui Chen
- Subsidiaries: Inner Mongolia Baotou Steel Union Company Limited
- Website: btsteel.com

Inner Mongolia Baotou Steel Union Company Limited
- Native name: 內蒙古包钢钢联股份有限公司
- Type: State-owned enterprise
- Traded as: CSI A100
- Industry: Steel manufacturing
- Founded: 1997
- Headquarters: Baotou, Inner Mongolia, China
- Area served: People's Republic of China
- Key people: Chairman: Mr. Cao Zhongkui
- Parent: Baotou Iron and Steel Group Company Limited

Baotou Iron and Steel Group, Baotou Steel or Baogang Group is an iron and steel state-owned enterprise in Baotou, Inner Mongolia, China. It was reorganized in 1998 from Baotou Iron and Steel Company established in 1954. It is the largest steel enterprise in Inner Mongolia. It has a large production base of iron and steel and the largest scientific research and production base of rare earths in China.

Its subsidiary company, Inner Mongolia Baotou Steel Union (SSE: 600010), was established and listed on the Shanghai Stock Exchange in 1997.

As a result of an accident in January 2026 more than 80 workers were injured and 9 were killed in the Baotou plant.

== See also ==
- Baogang Tailings Dam
