= Steel industry in China =

Overview of the steel industry of China

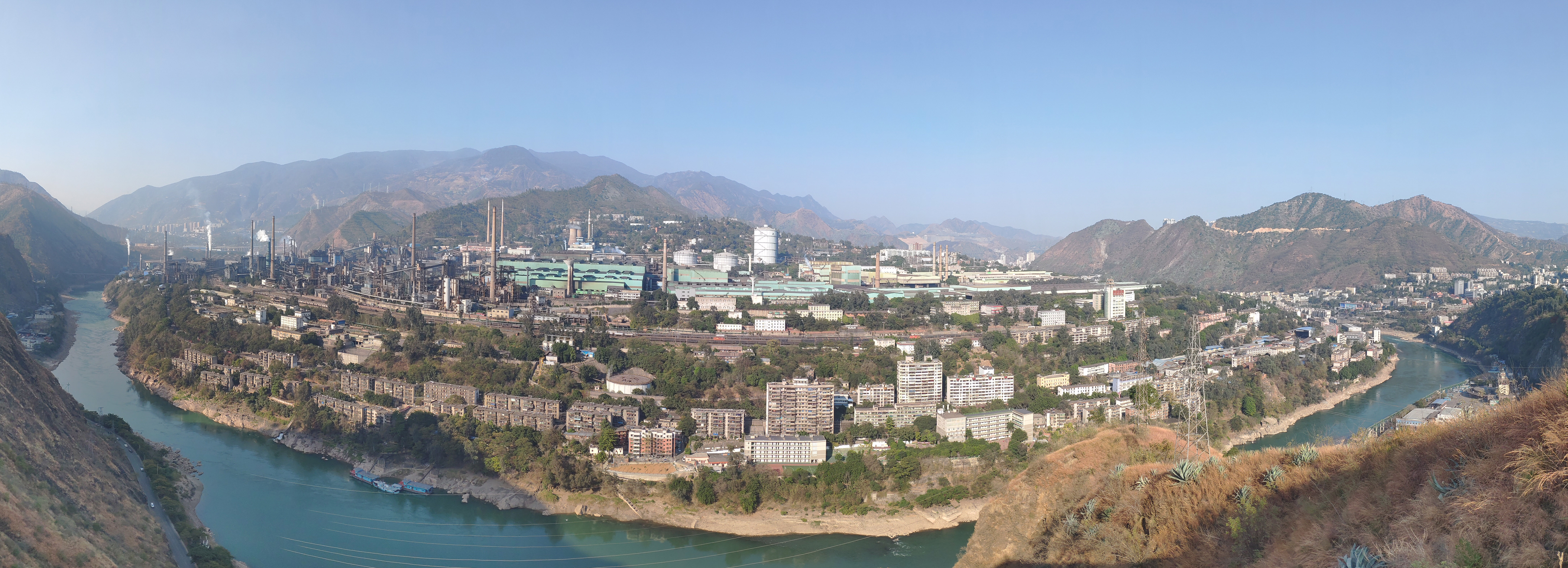
The Main Plant Area of Panzhihua Iron and Steel Company

The steel industry of the People's Republic of China, initially small and hindered by war, expanded rapidly following market reforms in 1978, eventually becoming the world's largest producer. Despite this growth, the industry faced challenges with high debt, market volatility, and environmental pressures. Rising exports from 2023-2024 led to global oversupply, price drops, and tariffs, prompting China to halt new steel mill approvals and encourage overseas investments. China's central government has also worked to phase out unprofitable "zombie" companies while pushing for stricter environmental controls on steel production.

== History ==
Steel production by countries.

China became the world's largest steel producer in the late 1990s.

=== 20th century ===
From the early 1900s through both world wars, China's steel industry was small and sparsely populated. The industry's infrastructure which had relied on Soviet technology was mostly destroyed during the wars.

The steel industry became a priority during the country's First Five-Year Plan period (1953–1957), when industrial development became China's primary goal. Power plants, steel, mining, machinery, chemicals, and national defense were deemed high priorities. Among the large steel mills built or expanded under Soviet-style planning, only Anshan Iron and Steel operated close to the desired capacity by 1956. During this time, slow steel production hindered China's industrial growth.

As a result, Chinese leadership mandated a major increase in steel production in late 1957 and early 1958. These efforts included major investments in large scale steel manufacturing as well as the reorganization of urban labor in an effort to produce steel at other scales.

China underwent rapid economic industrialisation since Deng Xiaoping's market reforms which took place in 1978.

The steel industry gradually increased its output. China's annual crude steel output was 100 million tons in 1996.

=== 21st century ===
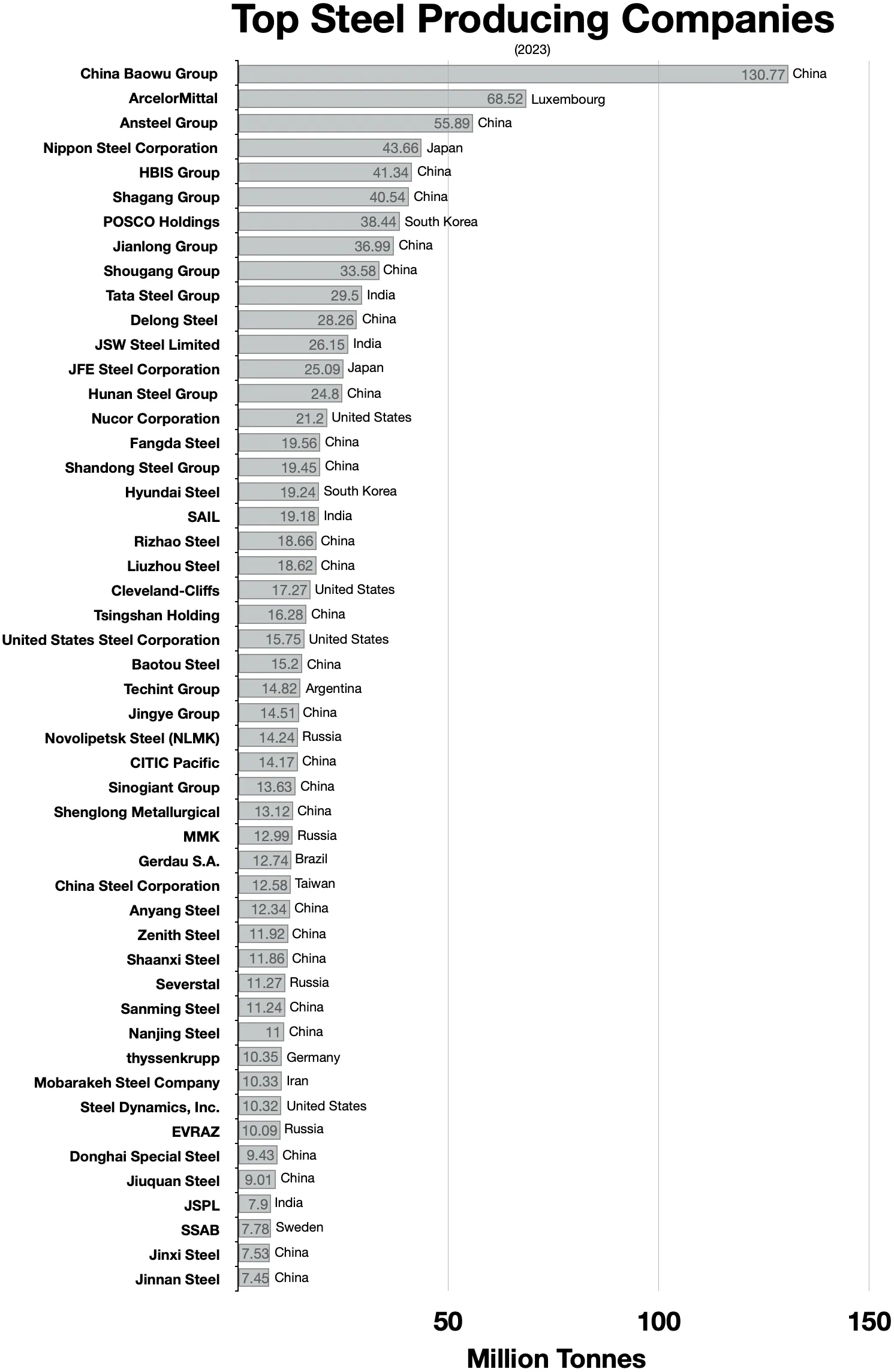
Top steel producing companies

China produced over 1 billion tonnes of crude steel in 2022, 52.9% of the world's total production, and up from 123 million tonnes (121,000,000 long tons; 136,000,000 short tons) of steel in 1999. After ascension to the WTO China aggressively expanded production for export and the growing appetite of local manufacturing industries such as automotive vehicles, consumer electronics and building materials.

The Chinese steel industry is dominated by a number of large state-owned groups which are owned via shareholdings by local authorities, provincial governments and even the central authorities. According to China Iron and Steel Association, The top 5 steel groups by production volume in 2015 are Baosteel Group–Wuhan Iron and Steel Corporation, Hesteel Group, Shagang Group, Ansteel Group and Shougang Group. As of at least 2024, the Chinese steel industry is highly fragmented, with a large number of companies.

By 2008 raw materials such as iron ore prices grew and China had to reluctantly agree to price increases by the three largest iron ore producers in the world; BHP, Rio Tinto and Vale. During the 2008 financial crisis, the Chinese steel mills won price reprieves as demand from their customers slowed. When the demand started to pick up again in 2009 and in 2010, the price crept back up due to higher demand for automobiles, low interest rates, government fiscal stimuli around the world. Prices for iron ore were negotiated on an annual contract pricing scheme. Australian iron ore producers were not happy that iron prices did not reflect Spot market pricing. In 2010 pressure from BHP and Rio Tinto to move to a quarterly based index pricing succeeded. Many Japanese steel mills and Chinese steel companies had to follow as demand for raw materials heated up. Spot-basis pricing has caused problems for steel manufacturers such as exposing them to price fluctuation in the market and reducing the stability of resource supply. Steel mills prefer long term pricing to hedge against cost and maintain raw material supply stability. Rio Tinto has said it will cancel contracts and sell the steel on the spot markets if Chinese steel mills back down on the new quarterly pricing regime.

In 2011 China was the largest producer of steel in the world producing 45% of the world's steel, 683 million tons, an increase of 9% from 2010. 6 of 10 of largest steel producers in the world are in China. Profits are low despite continued high demand due to high debt and overproduction of high end products produced with the equipment financed by the high debt. The central government is aware of this problem but there is no easy way to resolve it as local governments strongly support local steel production. Meanwhile, each firm aggressively increases production.

China was the top exporter of steel in the world in 2008. Export volumes in 2008 were 59.23 million tons, a 5.5% fall over the previous year. The decline ended China's decade-old steel export growth. As of 2012 steel exports faced widespread anti-dumping taxes and had not returned to pre-2008 levels. Domestic demand remained strong, particularly in the developing west where steel production in Xinjiang was expanding.

On 26 April 2012 a warning was issued by China's bank regulator to use caution with respect to lending money to steel companies who, as profits from the manufacture and sale of steel have fallen, have sometimes used borrowed money for speculative purposes. According to the China Iron and Steel Association the Chinese steel industry lost 1 billion Rmb in the first quarter of 2012, its first loss since 2000.

As of 2015 the global steel market was weak with both Ukraine and Russia attempting to export large amounts of steel. Weak domestic demand in 2014 resulted in record exports of 100 million metric tons of steel by the Chinese steel industry.

In 2015, China produced 49.6% of the world's steel.

Efforts by the Chinese Ministry of Environmental Protection under the Action Plan for the Prevention and Control of Air Pollution has resulted in pressure on steel mills in Linyi and Chengde to employ environmental protection measures on pain of being closed down.

In the context of lowered demand (see also 2015–16 Chinese stock market crash), in 2016 the Chinese state announced large scale closures and redundancies in heavy and primary industries, many of which were functioning as zombie companies, with 1.8 million redundancies (15% of workforce) in the coal and steel industries planned to take place by 2020.

A 2025 study shows that from to 2010 to 2023 Chinese imports supplied 53.3% of the increased steel demand in Latin America which grew 12.2 Mt in the period. Huachipato, the main steelmaker in Chile went bankrupt in 2024 in face of competition from cheap Chinese imports.

==== Glut ====
Amidst the Chinese property sector crisis and weakening demand for steel at a domestic level, China's steel exports surged in 2023 and 2024, primarily going to developing countries. This glut triggered a substantial decline in the price of steel at a global level, which in turn prompted another wave of tariffs against Chinese steel from both developed and developing countries. The Chinese government responded to the steel glut by suspending approvals of new steel mills in August 2024. Additionally, Chinese steelmakers hoping to retain a presence in foreign markets have increased foreign investments in steel mills abroad, hoping to remedy excess capacity.

In December 2024, Chinese researchers developed an iron-making technology that speeds up steel production, according to a published paper in the peer-reviewed journal Nonferrous Metals. The method injects iron ore powder into a super-hot furnace, which produces high-purity iron in just 3-6 seconds, compared to the 5-6 hours needed by traditional methods.

When an existing blast furnace is modified to use biomass products as its fuel, production of both green steel and green hydrogen/ammonia/urea are feasible.

== List of companies in China ==
- China Baowu Steel Group
- Ansteel Group
- Jiangsu Shagang
- Hesteel Group
- Jianlong Steel
- Shougang
- Shandong Iron and Steel Group
- Valin Steel Group
- Panzhihua Iron and Steel

== See also ==
- China Iron and Steel Association
- History of the steel industry (1850–1970)
- History of the steel industry (1970–present)
- List of countries by steel production
- List of steel producers
- Steel mill
