= Delong =

Delong is either a surname of French origin or a masculine given name of Chinese origin. DeLong and De Long are variants of the surname of French origin. Notable people with the names include:

== Surname ==
- Alana DeLong, Canadian politician
- Allison DeLong (1940–2014), Canadian politician
- Candice DeLong (born 1950), American criminologist
- Charles E. DeLong (1832-1876), American diplomat
- Delmar DeLong (1931–1999), American politician
- Elizabeth DeLong, American bio-statistician
- Gary DeLong, American soccer player
- George B. De Long (?–1924), American real estate businessman assassinated in Albania
- George W. De Long (1844–1881), American naval officer and arctic explorer
- J. Bradford DeLong (born 1960), American economist
- Jesse Delong (1805–1868), Canadian politician
- Joe DeLong (born 1972), American politician
- Keith DeLong (born 1967), American football player
- Mahlon DeLong, American neurologist
- Michael P. DeLong (1945–2018), American Marine general
- Phillip C. DeLong (1919–2006), American Marine officer
- Richard DeLong, American singer
- Robert DeLong, American musician and music producer
- Russell V. DeLong (1901–1981), American minister and college president
- Sidney Randolph DeLong (1875–1914), American politician
- Solomon DeLong (1849–1925), Pennsylvania Dutch writer and journalist
- Sophie Delong (born 1957), French politician
- Steve DeLong (1943–2010), American football player
- Tom DeLonge (born 1975), American musician, co-lead vocalist for band Blink-182

== Given name ==
- Ding Delong (1904–1996), Chinese military officer
- Jia Delong (born 1985), Chinese baseball player
- Xu Delong (1952–2018), Chinese materials scientist

== Other uses ==
- Delong, Indiana
- DeLong, Pleasants County, West Virginia
- DeLong Star Ruby
- USS DeLong
- Delong Steel, Chinese company

== See also ==
- Delonge
