= List of steel producers =

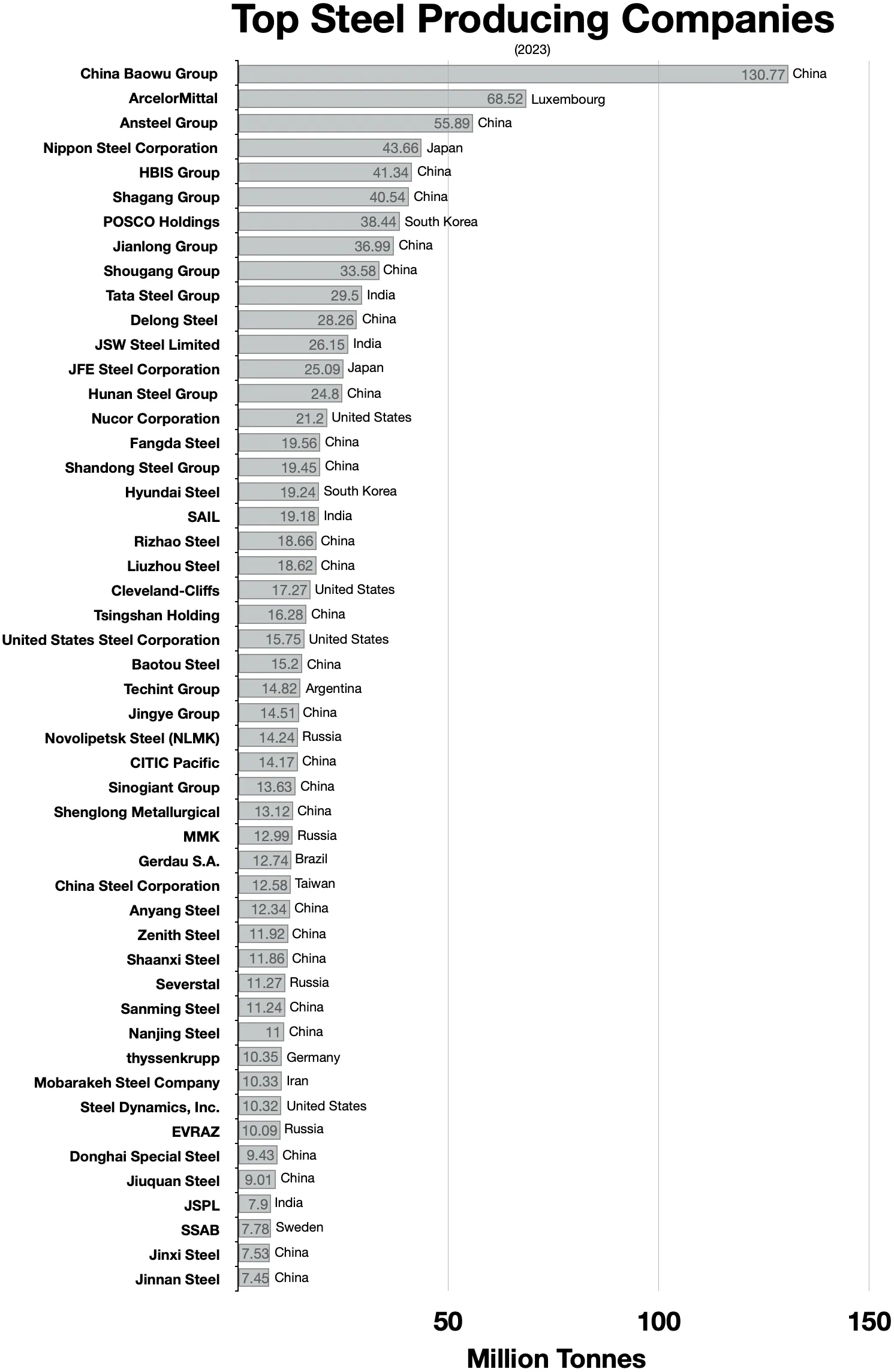
Top steel producing companies in 2023

This is a list of the largest steel-producing companies in the world mostly based on the list by the World Steel Association. The list ranks steelmakers by volume of steel production in millions of tons over time and includes all steelmakers with production over 10 million in 2024.

The World Steel Association features a list from its members every year. Due to mergers, year-to-year figures for some producers are not comparable. Not all steel is the same. Some steel is more valuable than other steel, so the volume is not the same as turnover.

Some of the world's leading steel producers include China Baowu Group and ArcelorMittal. Notable players from China are HBIS Group, Ansteel Group, and Shagang Group. In India, Tata Steel, JSW Steel, SAIL and Jindal Steel and Power are key players in the steel industry. Japan's Nippon Steel Corporation is renowned for quality. POSCO Holdings from South Korea is also a significant contributor.

Steelmakers from multiple different countries, Argentina, Brazil, China, Germany, India, Iran, Japan, Luxembourg, Russia, South Korea, Taiwan and the United States, are included in the list associated with their volumes used as figures.

== Top producers by volume ==
In millions of tonnes (Tg)
N°	Company	Country	2024	2023	2022	2021	2020	2019	2018	2017	2016	2015	2014	2013	2012	2011	2010	2009	2008	2007
1	Baowu	China	130.09	130.77	131.84	120.0	115.3	95.5	67.4	65.4	63.8	60.7	76.4	83.2	79.2	81	-	-	-	-
2	ArcelorMittal	Luxembourg	65.00	68.52	68.89	79.3	78.5	97.1	96.4	97	95.5	97.1	98.1	96.1	93.6	97.2	98.2	77.5	103.3	116.4
3	Ansteel Group	China	59.55	55.89	55.65	55.65	38.2	39.2	36.4	35.8	33.2	32.5	34.3	33.7	30.2	29.8	22.1	20.1	16	16.2
4	Nippon Steel	Japan	43.64	43.66	44.37	49.46	41.6	51.7	49.2	47.4	46.2	46.3	49.3	50.1	47.9	33.4	35.0	26.5	37.5	35.7
5	Hesteel Group	China	42.28	41.34	41	41.64	43.8	46.6	46.8	45.6	46.2	47.7	47.1	45.8	42.8	44.4	52.9	40.2	33.3	31.1
6	Jiangsu Shagang	China	40.22	40.54	41.45	44.23	41.6	41.1	40.7	38.4	33.3	34.2	35.3	35.1	32.3	31.9	30.1	26.4	23.3	22.9
7	Jianlong Steel	China	39.37	36.99	36.56	36.71	36.5	31.2	27.9	20.3	16.5	15.1	15.2	14.3	13.8	12.4	8.8	8.4	6.5	7.8
8	POSCO	South Korea	37.79	38.44	38.64	43.0	40.6	43.1	42.9	42.2	41.6	42	41.4	38.4	39.9	39.1	35.4	31.1	34.7	31.1
9	Shougang	China	31.57	33.58	33.82	35.43	34.0	29.3	27.4	27.6	26.8	28.6	30.8	31.5	31.4	30	25.8	17.3	12.2	12.9
10	Tata Steel	India	31.02	29.50	30.18	30.6	28.1	30.2	27.3	25.1	24.5	26.3	26.2	25.3	23	23.8	23.5	21.9	24.4	26.5
11	Delong Steel	China	29.33	28.26	27.90	27.8	28.3	26.8	3.2	2.6	3.2									
12	JSW Steel	India	26.95	26.15	23.38	18.6	14.9	16.3	16.8	16.1	14.9	12.4	12.7	11.8	8.5	7	6.4	5.5	6.3	8.2
13	Hunan Valin Steel	China	24.90	24.80	26.2	26.8	24.3	23	20.2	15.5	14.9	15.4	15	14.1	15.9	15.1	11.8	11.3	11.1	-
14	JFE	Japan	23.53	25.09	26.20	26.9	24.4	27.4	29.2	30.2	30.3	29.8	31.4	31.2	30.4	29.9	31.1	25.8	33	34
15	Jingye Steel	China	22.72	14.51	15.4	16.3	12.6	11.3	10.4	11	11.3	10.5	9.7	7.3	5.8	-	-	-	-	-
16	Nucor	United States	20.66	21.20	25.7	22.7	23.1	25.5	24.4	22	19.6	21.4	20.2	20.1	19.9	18.3	14	20.4	20	-
17	Shandong Steel	China	19.45	19.45	29.42	28.25	31.1	27.6	23	21.7	23	21.7	23.3	22.8	23	24	23.2	26.4	21.8	23.8
18	Liuzhou Iron and Steel	China	19.22	18.62	18.8	16.9	14.4	13.5	12.3	11.1	10.8	11.4	-	-	-	-	-	-	-	-
19	Fangda Steel	China	19.10	19.56	20.2	19.6	15.7	15.5	15.1	13.7	13.2	13.6	13.2	3.3	2.6	-	-	-	-	-
20	Steel Authority of India Limited	India	19.10	19.18	17.93	17.3	15.0	16.2	16.3	14.8	14.4	14.3	13.6	13.5	13.5	13.5	13.6	13.5	13.7	13.9
21	Hyundai Steel	South Korea	18.36	19.24	19.6	19.8	21.6	21.9	21.2	20.1	20.5	20.6	17.2	17.1	16.3	12.9	8.4	9.9	10	
22	Rizhao Steel	China	18.30	18.66	13.6	14.4	14.2	15	15	13.9	14	11.4	12.7	13.2	11.2	9.8	9.9	7.5	6.2	
23	Cleveland-Cliffs	United States	16.40	17.27	16.3	3.6														
24	CITIC Limited	China	16.15	14.17	14.0	14.1	13.6	12.3	8.8	8.4	7.6	7.9	7.7	-	-	-	-	-	-	-
25	Tsingshan Stainless Steel	China	16.00	16.28	12.4	10.8	11.4	9.3	-	-	-	-	-	-	-	-	-	-	-	-
26	Baotou Steel	China	14.99	15.20	16.5	15.6	15.5	15.3	14.2	12.3	11.9	10.7	10.7	10.2	10.2	10.1	10.1	8.8	9.8	
27	Jinan Steel	China	14.30	15.27																
28	Techint	Argentina	14.29	14.82	14.9	12.6	14.4	15.4	11.8	8	8.4	9.4	9	8.7	9.5	8.8	6.9	10.4	13.1	
29	U.S. Steel	United States	14.18	15.75	16.3	11.6	13.9	15.4	14.4	14.2	14.5	19.7	20.4	21.4	22	22.3	15.2	23.2	21.5	
30	Novolipetsk Steel	Russia	13.60	14.24	17.3	15.8	15.6	17.4	17.1	16.6	16	16.1	15.5	14.9	12.1	11.9	10.9	11.3	9.7	-
31	Hebei Sinogiant Group	China	13.04	13.63	14.3	14.2	10.3													
32	Guangxi Shenglong Metallurgical	China	12.79	13.12	12.2	12.1	7.6													
33	Gerdau	Brazil	12.78	12.74	14.2	13.0	13.1	15.8	16.5	16	17	19	19	19.8	20.5	21.6	14.2	20.4	18.6	
34	China Steel	Taiwan	12.65	12.58	16.0	14.1	15.2	15.9	15.3	15.5	14.8	15.4	14.3	12.7	14	12.7	8.9	11	10.9	
35	Zenith Steel Group	China	12.61	11.92	12.8	12.8	10.9	8.7	10.4	9.2	9.1	9	8.5	7.6	7	-	-	-	-	-
36	Anyang Steel	China	12.50	12.34	9.5	11.2	10.5	11	10	10.5	10.7	10.9	10.3	7.7	9.4	10.0	8.5	9.0		
37	Sanming Steel	China	11.41	11.24	11.4	11.4	12.4	11.7	11.2	10.4	9.6	9.2	8.2	7	5.7	-	-	-	-	-
38	Nanjing Iron and Steel Company	China	11.35	11	11.6	11.6	11	10	9.9	9	8.6	8	6.1	7.2	-	-	-	-	-	-
39	Magnitogorsk Iron and Steel Works	Russia	11.20	12.99	13.6	11.6	12.5	12.7	12.9	12.5	12.2	13	11.9	13	12.2	11.4	9.6	12	13.3	
40	Shaanxi Steel	China	11.02	11.86	12.4	13.2	12.5	11.4	10.2	7.3	7.5	7.9	8	6.7	5.2	-	-	-	-	-
41	Severstal	Russia	10.38	11.27	11.7	11.3	11.9	12	11.7	11.5	14.2	15.7	15.1	15.3	14.7	16.7	19.2	17.3	-	-
42	ThyssenKrupp	Germany	10.26	10.35	12.0	10.7	12.3	12.6	13.2	17.2	17.3	17.2	15.9	15.1	17.9	16.7	11	15.9	17	
43	Steel Dynamics	United States	10.20	10.32	12.2	11.2														
44	Mobarakeh Steel	Iran	10.19	10.33	16.7	18.9	16.8	16.8	15.6	14	14.1	14.4	14.3	13.6	12.6	11.4	10.6	10	10.1	
World total	-			1,892	1.890	1,952	1,878	1,869	1,814	1,733	1,629	1,621	1,671	1,607	1,548	1,490	1,413	1,219	1,329	1,348

== Other steel producers ==
- Acerinox, Spain
- Aichi Steel Corporation, Japan
- Aisha Steel Mills, Pakistan
- Algoma Steel, Canada
- Allegheny Technologies, United States
- Acerias Paz del Rio, Colombia
- Altos Hornos y Acerías de Corral, Chile
- Angang Steel Company Limited, China
- Anyang Steel, China
- Aperam, Luxembourg
- Arrium, Australia
- BlueScope, Australia
- Böhler, Austria
- British Steel Ltd, United Kingdom
- BSRM, Bangladesh
- Byelorussian Steel Works, Belarus
- Carpenter Technology Corporation, United States
- Celsa Group, Spain
- Commercial Metals Company, United States
- Companhia Siderúrgica Nacional, Brazil
- Crucible Industries, United States
- Donghai Special Steel, China
- Dongkuk Steel, South Korea
- Esfahan Steel Company, Iran
- Erdemir, Turkey
- Eskoleia Stål, Norway
- Essar Steel, India
- Evraz, Russia
- EZDK, Egypt
- Handan Zongheng Iron and Steel, China
- Hebei Donghai Special Steel, China
- Illich Steel and Iron Works, Ukraine
- Ilva (company), Italy
- İsdemir, Turkey
- International Steels Limited, Pakistan
- ISD Corporation, Ukraine
- Ittefaq Group, Pakistan
- Japan Steel Works, Japan
- Jindal Steel and Power, India
- Jinxi Iron and Steel, China
- Jiuquan Steel, China
- Julien Inc., Canada
- Kobe Steel, Japan
- Krakatau Steel, Indonesia
- Kardemir, Turkey
- Libyan Iron and Steel Company, Libya
- Liberty Steel Group, UK
- Mahindra Ugine Steel, India
- Marcegaglia, Italy
- Mechel, Russia
- Meever & Meever, Netherlands
- Metaldom, Dominican Republic
- Metalloinvest, Russia
- Metinvest, Ukraine
- Mitsui & Co., Japan
- MMX Mineração, Brazil
- MMK-Atakaş Metallurgy, Turkey
- Mobarakeh Steel Company, Iran
- Mostostal, Poland
- Nisshin Steel, Japan
- Olympic Steel, United States
- Outokumpu, Finland
- Pakistan Steel Mills, Pakistan
- Panzhihua Iron and Steel, China
- Qatar Steel, Qatar
- Radius Recycling, United States
- Rautaruukki, Finland
- Reliance Steel & Aluminum Co., United States
- Sahaviriya Steel Industries, Thailand
- Salzgitter AG, Germany
- SeAH Beestel, South Korea
- Sheffield Forgemasters, United Kingdom
- SIDERPERU, Peru
- Sidetur, Venezuela
- Sonasid, Morocco
- SSAB, Sweden
- Stelco, Canada
- Tangshan Guofeng Iron and Steel, China
- Tenaris, Luxembourg
- Ternium - Hylsa and Imsa in Mexico, Siderar in Argentina
- Timken Company, United States
- Tuwairqi Steel Mills, Pakistan
- Usiminas, Brazil
- Vallourec, France
- Visakhapatnam Steel Plant, India
- Voestalpine, Austria
- Votorantim Siderurgia, Brazil

== Steel producers merged with other companies, split into other companies or no longer operational ==
- AK Steel (bought by Cleveland-Cliffs)
- Algoma Steel (assets bought by Essar Steel in April 2007)
- Altos Hornos de México, (defunct in 2024)
- Arbed (merged in 2002 forming Arcelor)
- Arcelor (merged with Mittal forming ArcelorMittal)
- Baosteel Group (merged with Wuhan Group forming China Baowu Steel Group)
- Benxi Steel Group (merged with Ansteel Group)
- Bethlehem Steel (assets bought by ISG in 2003. ISG merged with Mittal, now ArcelorMittal)
- Bohai Steel Group (bankrupted in 2016)
- British Steel Corporation formed in 1967 when steel was nationalised in the UK. Privatised again in 1988.
- British Steel plc (merged with Koninklijke Hoogovens (NL) in 1999 to form Corus, now Tata Steel)
- Carnegie Steel Company (sold to U.S. Steel in 1901)
- Cockerill-Sambre (acquired by Usinor in 1998, which became part of Arcelor in 2002, now ArcelorMittal)
- Corus Group (acquired by Tata Steel in 2007)
- Dofasco in Hamilton, Ontario, Canada (acquired by Arcelor, now ArcelorMittal)
- Falck Group (turned the production to renewable energy with Falck Renewables)
- Gruppo Riva (split into ILVA and Riva Forni Electtrici in 2013)
- Hoesch Stahl AG (acquired by ThyssenKrupp)
- Inland Steel Company (acquired by Ispat International became Mittal, now ArcelorMittal)
- International Steel Group (merged with Mittal, now ArcelorMittal)
- Jones and Laughlin Steel Company (acquired by Ling-Temco-Vought, renamed LTV Steel, acquired by ISG)
- Koninklijke Hoogovens (merged with British Steel (UK) in 1999 to form Corus, now Tata Steel)
- Krupp (merged with Thyssen to form ThyssenKrupp in 1999)
- Kunming Steel, China (merged into China Baowu Steel Group)
- Lackawanna Steel Company (acquired by Bethlehem Steel in 1922, plants closed in 1982)
- Laiwu Steel (merged into Shandong Iron and Steel Group)
- Lone Star Steel Company (acquired by U.S. Steel in 2007)
- Maanshan Iron & Steel (acquired by China Baowu in 2019)
- Mittal Steel Company (merged with Arcelor forming ArcelorMittal)
- National Steel Corporation (acquired by U.S. Steel in 2003)
- Northwestern Steel and Wire (reorganized and operating as Sterling Steel Company)
- Pingxiang Iron and Steel (merged with Jiujiang Steel forming Fangda Steel)
- Republic Steel (merged into LTV Steel, acquired by ISG, merged with Mittal, now ArcelorMittal)
- Rouge Steel (formerly owned by Ford Motor Corporation; acquired by Severstal in 2004)
- Steel Company of Wales (absorbed into British Steel Corporation in 1967)
- Taiyuan Iron and Steel Group (merged into China Baowu Steel Group)
- Timken (split to form TimkenSteel Corporation in 2014)
- Thyssen (merged with Krupp to form ThyssenKrupp in 1999)
- Weirton Steel (acquired by ISG, which merged with Mittal, now ArcelorMittal)
- Wuhan Iron and Steel Corporation (merged with Baosteel forming China Baowu Steel Group)
- Youngstown Sheet and Tube (acquired by Jones and Laughlin Steel Company ca. 1977)
