= Xuansteel =

Chinese iron and steel enterprise

Xuanhua Steel Group Co., Ltd. 宣化钢铁集团有限责任公司
- Type: State-owned enterprise
- Industry: Steel manufacturing
- Founded: 1919; 107 years ago
- Headquarters: Xuanhua District, Zhangjiakou, Hebei, People's Republic of China
- Area served: People's Republic of China
- Parent: Hesteel Group
- Website: http://www.xuangang.com.cn

Xuanhua Steel Group Co., Ltd. (Chinese: 宣化钢铁集团有限责任公司) or Xuansteel is a state-owned iron and steel enterprise located in Xuanhua District, Hebei Province, China, which is mainly engaged in Steel business. In 2006, the company incoperated into the Tangsteel Group.

In 2008, Tangsteel merged with Hansteel and formed the Hebei Steel Group (Hesteel), becoming China's largest and the world's fifth largest steel company.

In 2016, Hebei Province introduced a plan to shut down the old factory in Xuanhua District, Zhangjiakou before 2020, and start the construction of new factory located in Laoting County, Tangshan in April, 2017.
