= Beijing Shougang (disambiguation) =

Beijing Shougang may refer to:

- Shougang Group, a Chinese conglomerate based in Beijing
  - Beijing Shougang Co., Ltd., listed arm of the group
  - The Beijing Ducks basketball team of the Chinese Basketball Association
  - The Beijing Great Wall basketball team of the Women's Chinese Basketball Association
  - Beijing Kuanli FC, during the time that the group sponsored the team and the team used the company name "Beijing Shougang" as part of its team name
