= Wang Chonglun =

Chinese model worker (1927–2002)

Wang Chonglun (1927–2002) was a Chinese model worker at the Anshan Iron and Steel Company (Angang).

== Biography ==
Wang was born in 1927 in Liaoyang, Liaoning.

Wang was a Chinese model worker at the Anshan Iron and Steel Company (Angang). His work speed resulted in the nickname "man in front of time".

In December 1953, Wang organized the Wang Chonglun Advanced Producer School, modeled on the Stakhanovite School of the Soviet Union.

In 1960, Wang worked at Angang's Northern Machine-Repair Factory. There, Wang invented a semi-automated drilling machine that increased worker drilling speed by a factor of fourteen.

Wang and a group of other model workers proposed that the All-China Federation of Trade Unions launch a national technological innovation campaign, which the ACFTU did.

Wang became was the chairman of the Anshan Iron and Steel Trade Union, vice chairman of the ACFTU, and deputy secretary of the Harbin Municipal Party Committee.

Wang died in 2002.

== Cultural depictions ==
Wang's experiences, along with those of fellow Anshan model worker Meng Tai, are portrayed in the 2022 film Steel Will.

== See also ==
- Technological and industrial history of China
