= Angang =

Angang may refer to:

- Angang-eup, a town in Gyeongju, South Korea
- Anshan Iron and Steel Group Corporation, or Ansteel Group, major Chinese steel producer
- Angang Steel Company, a listed subsidiary of Anshan Iron and Steel Group
