= Pangang =

Pangang may refer to:

- Panzhihua Iron and Steel: the largest state-owned steel-making enterprise in Western China.
- Panzhihua New Steel and Vanadium: the subsidiary company of Panzhihua Iron and Steel.
