= Jianlong =

Jianlong may refer to:

- Jianlong (960–963), reign period of Emperor Taizu of Song
- Jianlong, Chongqing, town in Bishan District, Chongqing, China
- Jianlong Steel, Chinese steel company
