= Cleveland-Cliffs =

American based steelmaking company

Cleveland-Cliffs Inc.

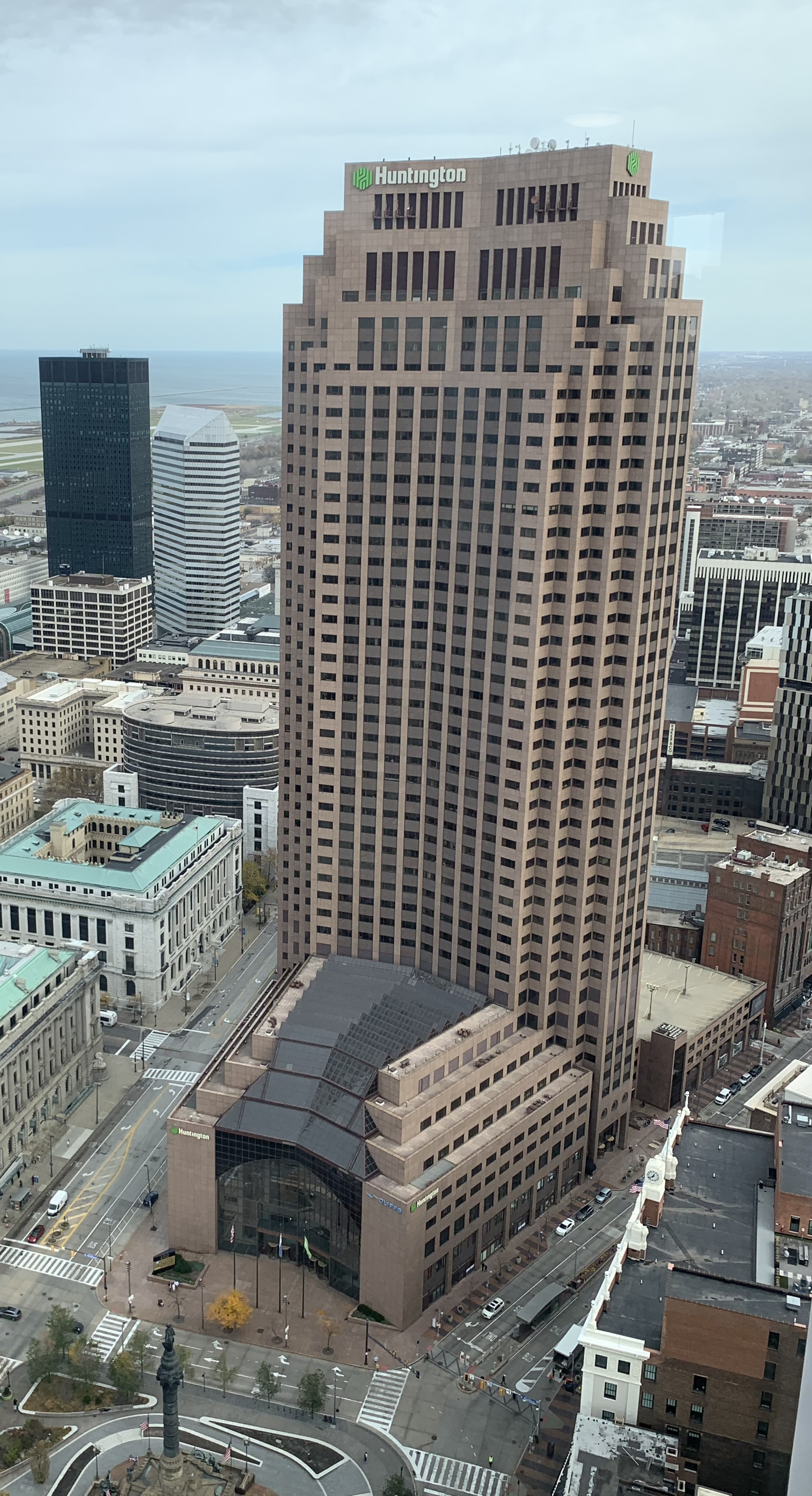
- Headquarters at 200 Public Square
- Formerly: Cleveland Iron Company (1847–1891); Cleveland-Cliffs Iron Company (1891–1985); Cleveland-Cliffs Inc. (1985–2008); Cliffs Natural Resources Inc. (2008-2017)
- Type: Public company
- Traded as: NYSE: CLF; S&P 400 component
- Industry: Steel
- Founded: 1847; 179 years ago as Cleveland Iron Company in Cleveland, Ohio, United States
- Founder: Samuel Livingston Mather and associates
- Headquarters: 200 Public Square, Cleveland, Ohio, U.S.
- Key people: C. Lourenco Goncalves, Chairman & CEO; Celso Goncalves, CFO & President; Clifford T. Smith, COO
- Products: Steel; Iron ore pellets Direct reduced iron Stainless steel
- Revenue: ▼US$18.6 billion (2025)
- Operating income: ▼US$−1.58 billion (2024)
- Net income: ▼US$−1.43 billion (2025)
- Total assets: ▼US$20.0 billion (2025)
- Total equity: ▼US$6.32 billion (2025)
- Number of employees: 25,000 (2025)
- Subsidiaries: Lake Superior and Ishpeming Railroad; Stelco
- Website: clevelandcliffs.com

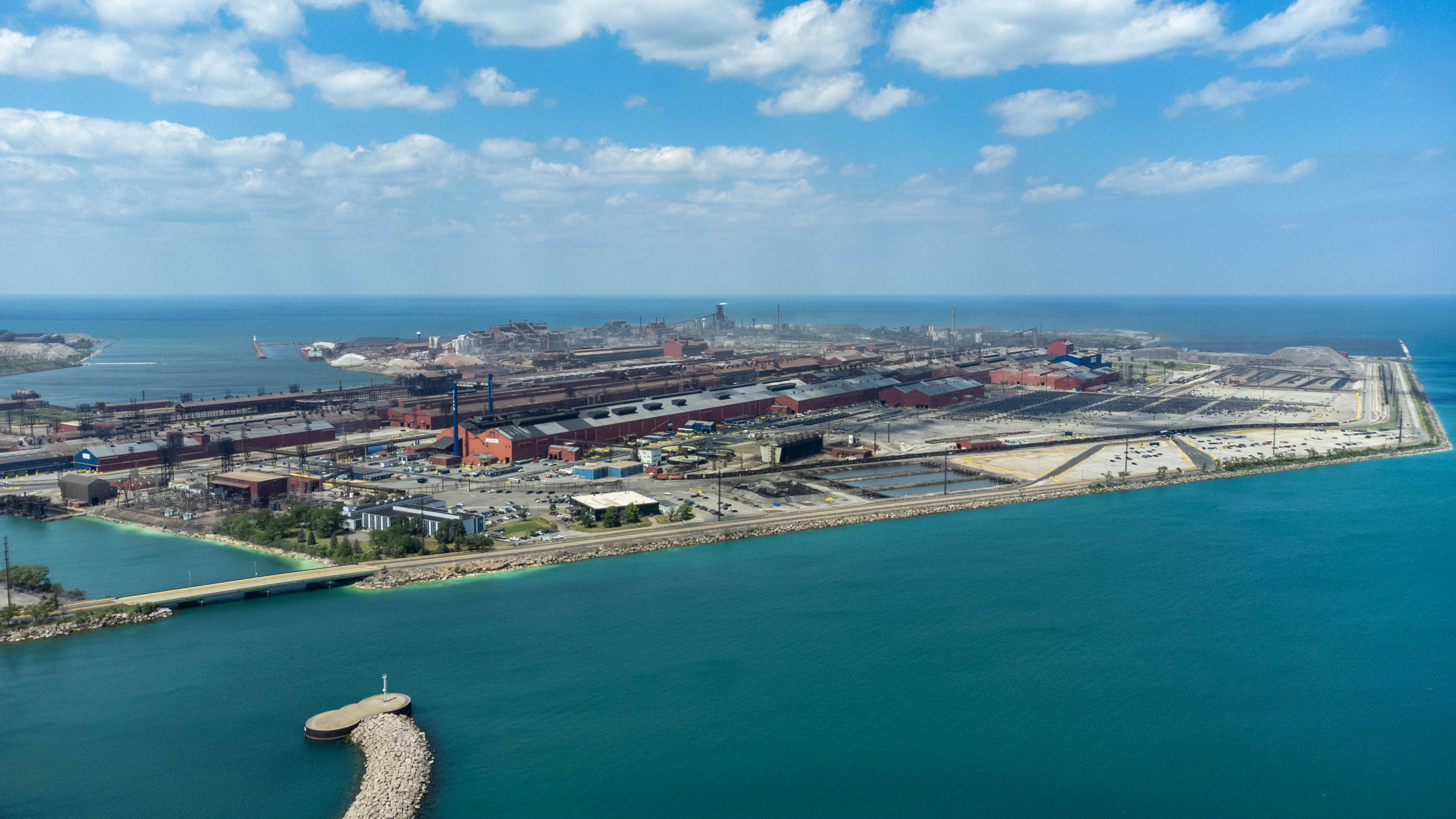
Indiana Harbor Works in 2022

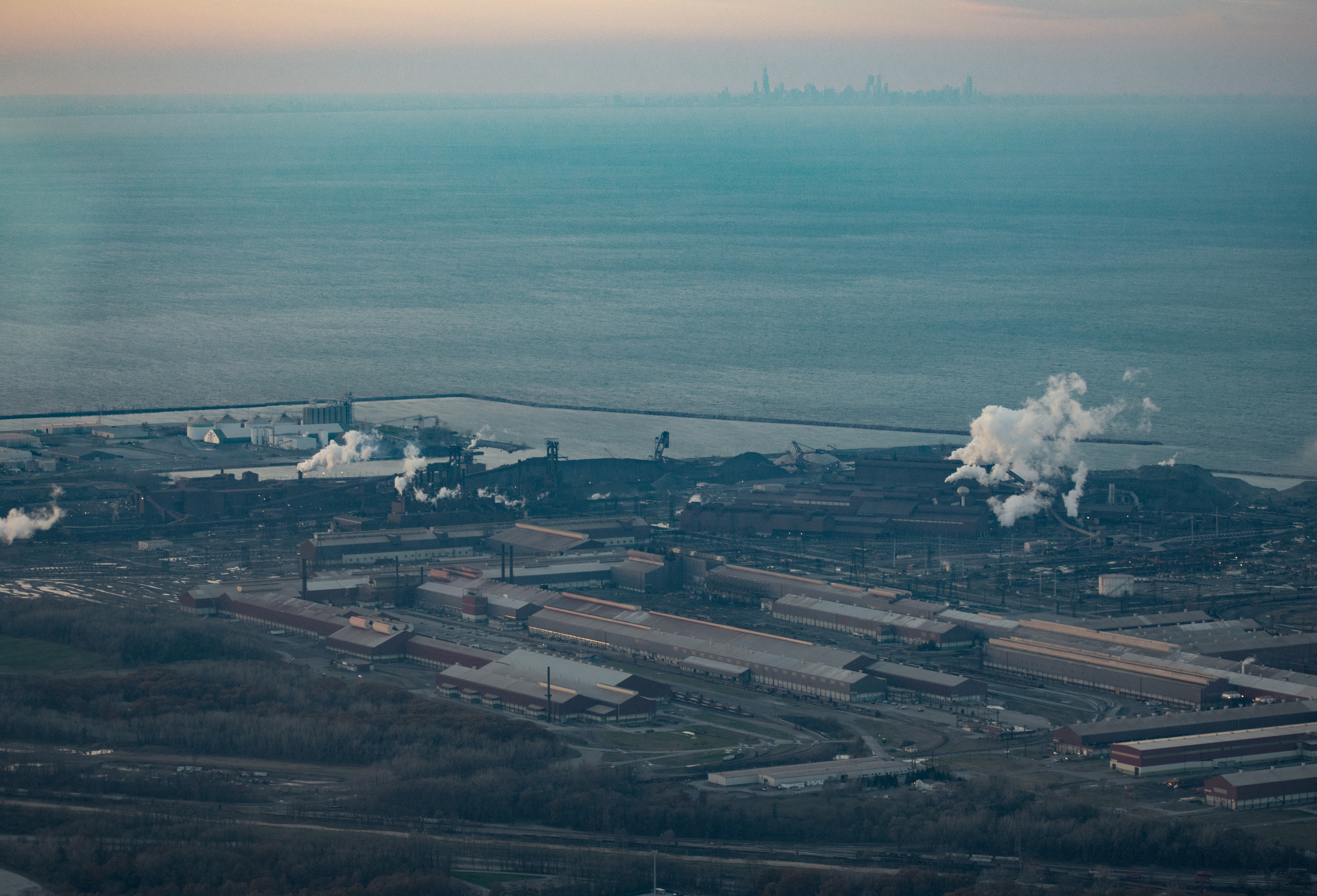
The ArcelorMittal mill at Burns Harbor, purchased by Cleveland-Cliffs in 2020

Cleveland-Cliffs Inc. (CCI, formerly Cliffs Natural Resources) is an American steel manufacturer based in Cleveland, Ohio. It specializes in the mining, beneficiation, and pelletizing of iron ore, as well as steelmaking, including stamping and tooling. The company is ranked 23rd on the list of steel producers and is the second-largest steel producer in the United States after Nucor. It is the largest flat-rolled steel producer in North America. The company is ranked 221st on the Fortune 500 and 1511th on the Forbes Global 2000.

== Operations ==
The company operates four divisions: Steelmaking, Tubular, Tooling and Stamping, and European Operations. It operates eight blast furnaces and five EAFs and finishing facilities in Kentucky, Indiana, Illinois, Ohio, Michigan, Pennsylvania, West Virginia, North Carolina, and Ontario. It has an annual production capacity of approximately 23 million net tons of raw steel.

Cleveland-Cliffs manages and operates four iron ore mines in Minnesota and two mines in Michigan, one of which, the Empire Mine, has been indefinitely idled. These mines produce various grades of iron ore pellets, including standard and fluxed, for use in blast furnaces as part of the steelmaking process as well as direct reduced (DR) grade pellets for use in direct reduced iron (DRI) applications. Since the mines are located near the Great Lakes, the majority of the pellets are transported by rail to loading ports for shipments via vessel to steelmakers in North America.

The company operates a hot-briquetted iron (HBI) facility in Toledo, Ohio. HBI is a form of DRI that can be used as an alternative to scrap iron. When used as a feedstock, HBI can enable an electric arc furnace to produce more valuable grades of steel.

It also operates three coke-making facilities in Burns Harbor, Indiana, Monessen, Pennsylvania, and Warren, Ohio, with an annual capacity of 2.6 million tons, as well as a coal mine in Princeton, West Virginia.

=== Steelmaking ===
Cleveland‑Cliffs Inc. operates one of the most extensive integrated steelmaking networks in North America, encompassing basic‑oxygen‑furnace (BOF) and electric‑arc‑furnace (EAF) facilities, continuous casters, and finishing lines distributed across the Great Lakes region. The company's major steelworks include plants at Burns Harbor, Cleveland, Middletown, Dearborn, and East Chicago, along with downstream finishing and coating operations supplying the automotive, construction, and energy sectors.

The 160‑inch (4.06 m) plate mill at the company's Burns Harbor Works in Porter County, Indiana, is among the most significant assets in its portfolio. Industry sources describe it as the largest wide‑plate rolling mill currently operating in the world. The Burns Harbor mill was originally designed and constructed by Bethlehem Steel in the late 1960s under the direction of construction superintendent Robert (“Bob”) Romeril Sr., whose team oversaw its commissioning before full production began in 1967.

Through subsequent mergers—Bethlehem Steel → ISG → ArcelorMittal → Cleveland‑Cliffs—the plant has remained a cornerstone of U.S. heavy‑plate production. Its products are used in shipbuilding, armor, energy infrastructure, and bridge fabrication, continuing to represent large‑scale American steel engineering.

Cleveland‑Cliffs also operates the United States’ only producer‑owned stamp‑charged coking facility, located in Ohio, and maintains integrated pelletizing, direct‑reduced‑iron (DRI), and hot‑briquetted‑iron (HBI) capabilities at its Toledo HBI Plant, which began production in 2020 with a design capacity of 1.9 million metric tons per year.The company also has an aggregate raw steel production capacity of approximately twenty-three million short tons (20,865,249 metric tons) per year, making it the largest flat‑rolled steel producer in North America.

== History ==
=== 19th century ===
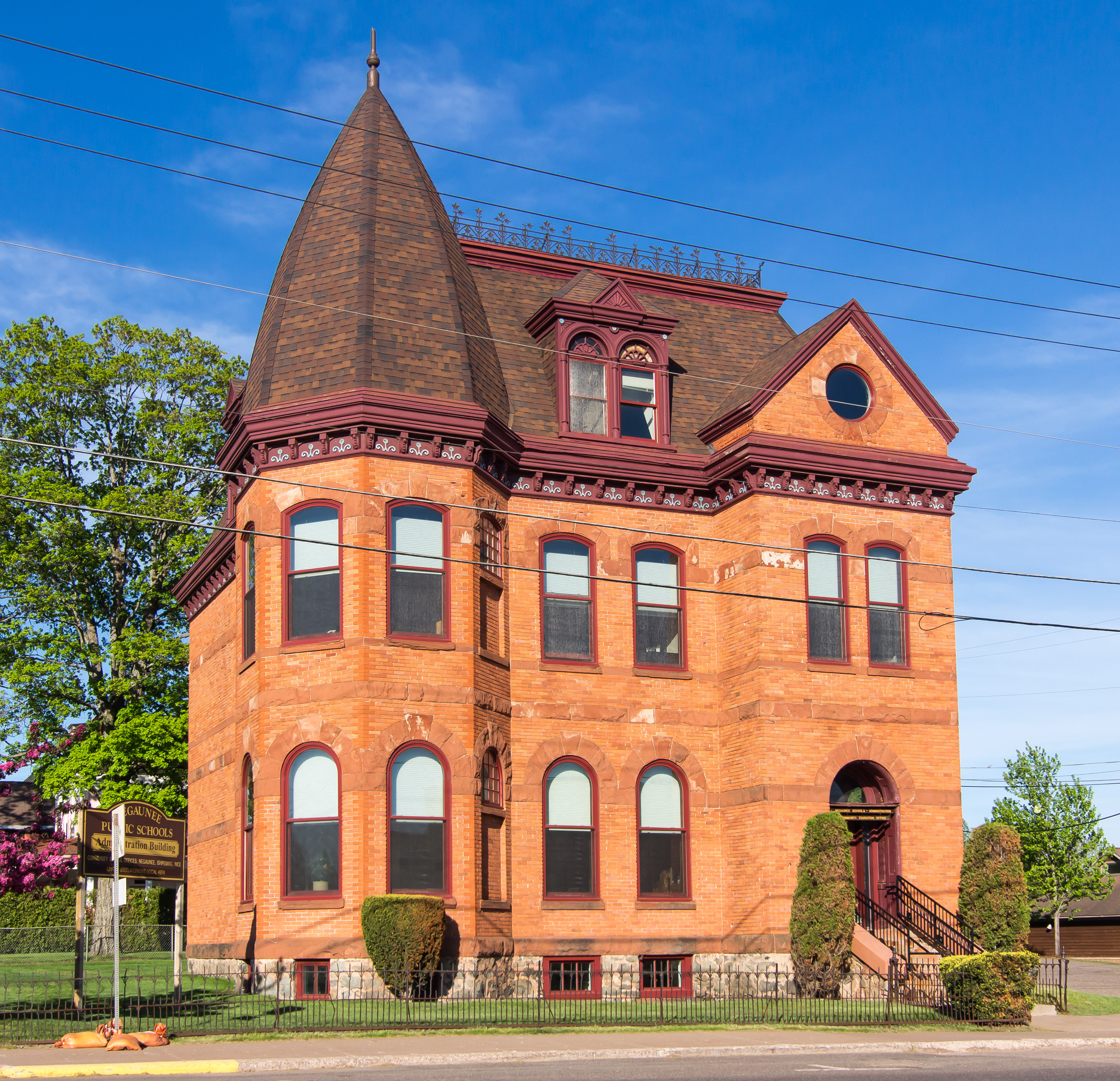
The historic office building for the Iron Cliffs Company in Negaunee, Michigan

The firm's earliest predecessor was the Cleveland Iron Mining Company, founded in 1847 and chartered as a company by Michigan in 1850. Samuel Livingston Mather and six Ohio-based associates had learned of rich iron-ore deposits recently discovered in the highlands of the Upper Peninsula of Michigan. Soon afterwards, the first Soo Locks opened in 1855, allowing iron ore to be shipped from Lake Superior to Lake Erie.

Technological improvements, such as the Bessemer process, made it possible for mills in the North American Great Lakes region to produce steel on an industrial scale. The south shore of Lake Erie was near a supply of coal, making that region an efficient point for the construction of steel mills.

The company's request for government intervention quashed the 1865 Upper Peninsula miners' strike.

In the late 1800s, the company expanded via acquisitions to gain market share. The former Cleveland Iron Mining Co. was a survivor of this shakeout, purchasing many of its competitors. One key merger in 1890, with Jeptha Wade's Iron Cliffs Company led the combined firm to change its name to the Cleveland-Cliffs Iron Company.

The company invested substantially to improve the logistics of iron-ore transport. In 1892, the firm built the Lake Superior and Ishpeming Railroad to carry iron ore from the mines directly to company-owned docks on Lake Superior.

=== 20th century ===
William G. Mather, the son of Samuel, guided Cleveland-Cliffs as president and later as chairman of the board from 1890 to 1947, participating in the transition from the hard-rock iron ore of Upper Michigan to the soft hematite of Minnesota's Mesabi Range and adjacent lodes. He consolidated mining operations into one powerful corporation while developing a diversification program when he invested in iron-ore mining and steel manufacturing.

Under Mather, Cleveland-Cliffs was a leader in the development of the classic-type lake freighter, a bulk-cargo vessel especially designed to carry Great Lakes commodities. The 618-foot-long (188 m) SS William G. Mather, launched in 1925, is a surviving example of this ship type. For almost a century, the black-hulled Cleveland-Cliffs ships were familiar sights on the upper lakes. Cleveland Cliffs pioneered the electrification of the iron mining process, employee benefits like the eight-hour day, built a company town for miners' residence, added employee pensions and safety programs.

In 1930, the company purchased 63% of Cleveland's Corrigan-McKinney Steel company, owners and operators of one of the "...finest steel plants in the country." Corrigan-McKinney was estimated to have assets of $60–65 million (US)(equivalent to $1.125000×10^{9} in 2025). In 1934, Cleveland Cliffs shareholders approved the purchase. By 1938, the company had recovered from the Great Depression and reported the highest sales and profits in its history.

In March 1942, both record tonnage and the earliest Great Lakes shipments of iron ore were being completed by the company. The 1941 tonnage broke the 1929 record at 80 million gross tons of iron ore. In 1946, the company recorded another technological breakthrough as it installed radar for the first time on the Great Lakes aboard its flagship, the SS William G. Mather.

In 1947, Cleveland-Cliffs Iron Company merged with its holding company, Cliffs Corporation of Cleveland to form a new corporation (with the same name) Cleveland-Cliffs Iron Company, with combined assets of $95 million (US)(equivalent to $1.369784×10^{9} in 2025). Shareholders of both former companies approved the transaction.

Demand for American iron ore hit peaks during World War I, World War II, and the post-World War II consumer boom. In 1933, Edward B. Greene (the son-in-law of Jeptha Homer Wade II) replaced William G. Mather as the head of the company. The Mather A Mine opened in the early 1940s and the Mather B shaft in the 1950s. In 1950, the company celebrated its 100th anniversary with the publication of a commemorative book, A Century of Iron Men, by Harlan Hatcher, vice president of Ohio State University.

As the Cold War continued, reserves of mineable hematite dwindled in northern Minnesota and Cleveland-Cliffs returned some of its focus to its traditional areas of interest around the Marquette Iron Range, where new deposits of magnetite were opened. The first pellet plant was built at Eagle Mills in 1954, followed by the first grate/kiln plant at the Humboldt Mine in 1960. The Republic Mine was converted from a shaft mine to an open pit and concentrator in 1956 and a two-kiln pellet plant was added in 1962. The Empire Mine opened in 1963 and was expanded in the mid- and late-1970s; the Pioneer Pellet Plant was opened in 1965 to pelletize the underground ore from the Mather B Mine in Negaunee, Michigan. In 1974, the Tilden Mine opened south of Ishpeming, Michigan. This mine was and is the only mine in the world with the ability to produce both hematite and magnetite pellets.

In 1970, a high-grade iron-ore mine was opened at Pannawonica in the Pilbara region of Western Australia, with a 200 km (120 mi) rail line to processing facilities at Cape Lambert for which the residential township of Wickham was built. A pellet plant was built but ceased operation before 1980, following a sharp increase in the cost of diesel fuel.

During the 1970s, Cleveland-Cliffs had large interests in uranium and shale oil fields, as well as the oil and gas drilling industries. It also had holdings in the forest products industry. These interests were sold in the 1980s when the company refocused its efforts on its core iron ore business.

After the 1973–1975 recession and the early 1980s recession, Cleveland-Cliffs shrank its operations, closing the Mather B Mine and the Pioneer Pellet Plant and associated Ore Improvement Plant in 1979. The Humboldt Pellet Plant closed in 1981 and the Republic Mine was idled in 1981 and closed for good in 1996, when Cliffs began turning the associated tailings ponds into compensatory wetlands for its other properties. Over half of the Marquette Iron Range employees were laid off and, in 1984, Cliffs withdrew from the Great Lakes shipping industry.

In November 1986, Cleveland-Cliffs announced the purchase of Pickands Mather Group, an iron ore company, from Moore-McCormack Resources. Assets included in the purchase were management and ownership stakes in Hibbing Taconite Company and Erie Mining Company in Minnesota, Wabush Mines and the Griffith Mine in Canada, and the Savage River Mine in Australia.

In 1994, the company acquired Northshore Mining in Silver Bay, Minnesota.

=== 21st century ===
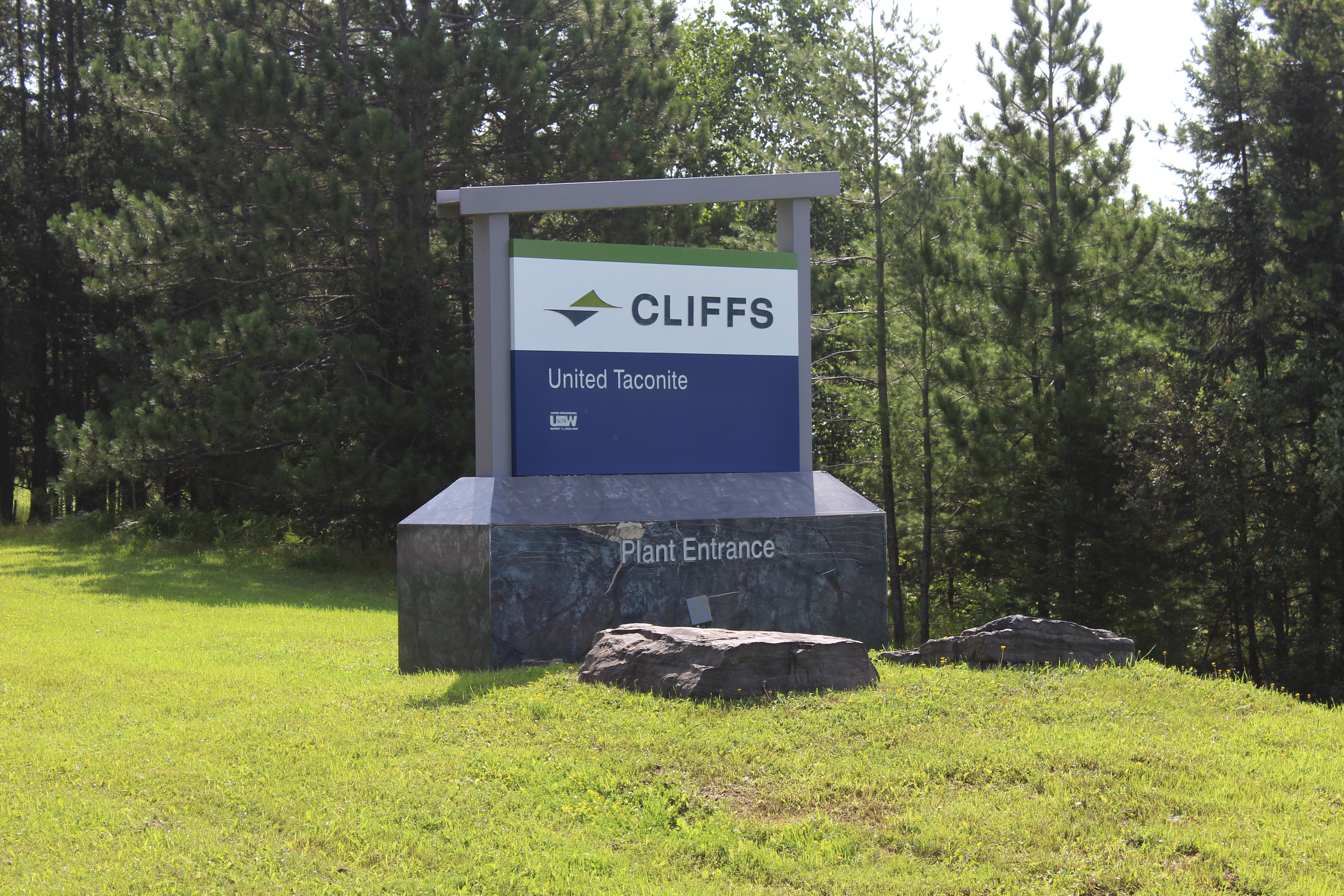
Entrance sign, Eveleth, Minnesota

In early 2001, Cleveland-Cliffs managed LTV Steel, the former Jones and Laughlin Steel Company. However, J&L/LTV Steel was forced to permanently close due to the bankruptcy of Ling-Temco-Vought. Later that year, the company cut its dividend by 73% due to low prices. As another outcome of the Ling-Temco-Vought closure, the Empire iron ore mine was idled for six months. President George W. Bush enacted the 2002 United States steel tariff that greatly benefitted domestically produced steel. Benefitting from the tariff, the company embarked upon a strategy to expand globally and to diversify into other minerals, leading to the acquisitions of iron-ore properties in Brazil, Canada and Australia and coal properties in Australia and the US. In 2003, the company, in a joint venture with Laiwu Steel, purchased the assets of bankrupt Eveleth Mines and formed United Taconite LLC. In 2008, it acquired the full ownership for $100 million in cash and 1,529,619 common shares.

In June 2007, the company acquired PinnOak, its first domestic coal company, which mined coal in Alabama and West Virginia and once belonged to U.S. Steel. Due to its venture into coal, the company changed its name from Cleveland-Cliffs to Cliffs Natural Resources in October 2008. In 2008, the company agreed to acquire Alpha Natural Resources but called off the transaction in November 2008 due to the 2008 financial crisis. It paid a $70 million breakup fee.

In January 2010, the company acquired Freewest Resources Canada for C$240 million, giving it 100% ownership of the Black Thor and Black Label, and 47% ownership of the Big Daddy chromite deposits in the Ring of Fire district in the James Bay Lowlands of Ontario, Canada. In July 2010, Cliffs increased its ownership stake in Big Daddy by acquiring Spider Resources for C$125 million. In 2015, these assets were sold to rival Noront Resources, owner of a minority stake in Big Daddy, for US$20 million.

In May 2011, the company acquired Consolidated Thompson Iron Mines from Wuhan Iron and Steel Corporation for C$4.9 billion. The acquisition included Bloom Lake iron ore mine in Quebec.

In July 2013, CEO Joseph Carrabba announced that he would retire by December 31, 2013. Lead director James Kirsch was elected non-executive chairperson in his stead. Gary Halverson, formerly interim chief operating officer of Barrick Gold, was appointed president and chief operating officer in October 2013, and president and chief executive officer in February 2014. At the 2014 annual general meeting, six new directors nominated by activist hedge fund Casablanca Capital were elected, giving the fund control of the board of directors. Lourenco Goncalves was appointed chairman, president and CEO of the company. The reconstituted Board moved to shift the company's strategic objectives from global diversification to a renewed focus on strengthening its U.S. iron ore business.

In December 2015, the company sold its remaining North American coal operations. Cliffs announced plans in early 2016 to close the Empire Mine near Marquette, Michigan, terminating the jobs of approximately 400 workers. The company announced on August 15, 2017, that it was returning to its former brand name, Cleveland-Cliffs Inc. In August 2018, the company sold its Asia Pacific iron ore assets. It also sold its Australian assets.

On March 13, 2020, the company acquired AK Steel for $1.1 billion. In December 2020, the company acquired the United States operations of ArcelorMittal for approximately $1.4 billion, making it the largest producer of flat-rolled steel and iron ore pellets in North America.

In February 2022, Cleveland-Cliffs agreed to pay a $3 million settlement related to Clean Water Act violations, including a cyanide and ammonia spill in August 2019 at the Port of Indiana that killed thousands of fish and closed Lake Michigan beaches. After the settlement, Cleveland-Cliffs stated it would change its water testing and public announcement procedures.

On July 28, 2023, Cleveland-Cliffs offered to acquire U.S. Steel for $10 billion. The proposal was endorsed by the United Steelworkers, but was rejected by U.S. Steel on August 13. U.S. Steel was instead acquired by Nippon Steel for $14.9 billion.

In November 2024, Cleveland-Cliffs acquired Stelco, a Canadian steel manufacturer, for $2.5 billion in cash and stock. As part of the acquisition, Cleveland-Cliffs also inherited Stelco's minority ownership stake in two professional Canadian sports teams, the Hamilton Tiger-Cats of the Canadian Football League and Forge FC of the Canadian Premier League.

In March 2025, the company partially idled its plant in Dearborn, Michigan as automakers reduced production due to tariffs in the second Trump administration. It also laid off 1,200 workers due to the reduction in demand.

== Archives ==
Cleveland-Cliffs has deposited many of its pre-1981 papers in the Historical Collections of the Great Lakes at Bowling Green State University as well as Central Upper Peninsula Archives at Northern Michigan University.

== See also ==
- Cliffs Shaft Mine Museum
- Iron mining in the United States
