= Steel Will =

- Traditional Chinese: 鋼鐵意志
- Simplified Chinese: 钢铁意志
- Hanyu Pinyin: Gāngtiě Yìzhì
- Directed by: Ning Haiqiang
- Starring: Liu Ye; Han Xue; Lin Yongjian; Zhang Guoqiang
- Production companies: CCP Liaoning Provincial Propaganda Department; Liaoning Federation of Trade Unions; Ansteel Group; CCP Anshan Municipal Propaganda Department; CCP Benxi Municipal Propaganda Department; Northern United Film Group Co., Ltd.; Bona Film Group Limited; Huaxia Film Distribution; All-China Federation of Trade Unions; People's Daily Online; Wanda Film Co., Ltd.
- Release date: 30 September 2022 (China)
- Running time: 105 minutes
- Country: China
- Language: Mandarin

Steel Will (Chinese: 钢铁意志) is a 2022 Chinese drama film directed by Ning Haiqiang and starring Liu Ye, Han Xue, Lin Yongjian, and Zhang Guoqiang. The film is adapted from the real-life stories of Meng Tai and Wang Chonglun, both were models workers devoted to the iron and steel production in Anshan Iron and Steel (Angang) in Anshan, Liaoning, the largest iron and steel base in China. The film was theatrically released on 30 September 2022.

== Cast ==
- Liu Ye as Zhao Tiechi, head of Ansteel Group.
- Han Xue as Sun Xuefei, an engineer.
- Lin Yongjian as Meng Tai
- Zhang Guoqiang as Cheng Shixun
- Li Pei'en as Wang Chonglun
- Dong Chunhui
- He Dujuan

== Soundtrack ==
| No. | Title | Lyrics | Music | Singer(s) | Length |
|---|---|---|---|---|---|
| 1. | "Steel Lover (钢铁爱人)" (Opening theme) | Zhang Yuzhu | Shu Nan | Tang Fei |
| 2. | "At First (之初)" (Promotional song) | Chen Tao | Wang Bei | Chen Sisi |

== Release ==
Steel Will was released on 30 September 2022, in China.
