= Delonge =

Delonge or DeLonge is a French surname. Notable people with the surname include:

- Franz-Benno Delonge (1957–2007), German board game designer
- Franz Josef Delonge (1927–1988), German lawyer and politician
- Marion Michael (born Marion Ilonka Michaela Delonge) (1940-2007), German actress
- Marco Delonge (born 1966), East German long jumper
- Tom DeLonge (born 1975), American singer-songwriter

== See also ==
- Delong
