= Shoucheng Holdings =

Hong Kong-based infrastructure asset management company

Shoucheng Holdings Limited 首程控股有限公司
- Company type: State-owned enterprise (Red chip)
- Industry: Infrastructure asset management, investment
- Founded: 1993; 33 years ago
- Headquarters: Hong Kong, China
- Area served: China
- Key people: Chairman: Mr. Zhao Tianyang
- Revenue: HK$883 million (2023)
- Net income: HK$404 million (2023)
- Parent: Shougang Group
- Website: www.shouchengholdings.com

Shoucheng Holdings Limited (SEHK: 697) is a Hong Kong-based investment holding company and a red chip stock. It is a subsidiary of Shougang Group, a state-owned enterprise based in Beijing. The company focuses on infrastructure asset management and intelligent infrastructure investment across mainland China.

The company operates under a dual business model of asset operation including intelligent parking infrastructure and property-related facilities and Fundraising, Investment, Management, and Exit, applied to infrastructure asset investment and lifecycle management.

== History ==
The company was originally established as Tung Wing Steel and Iron Company Limited. In 1992, Shougang Group and Cheung Kong Holdings acquired controlling interests, and in 1993 it was renamed Shougang Concord International. It was one of the early constituents of the Hang Seng China-Affiliated Corporations Index.

Since 2016, Shoucheng Holdings has undergone a major business transformation. It divested its legacy steel and trading businesses and transitioned to an infrastructure asset-focused model. In 2020, the company changed its name to Shoucheng Holdings Limited to reflect this new direction.

In 2023 and 2024, Shoucheng expanded its national footprint in infrastructure management:

- Acquired operating rights for parking assets at Tianjin Binhai International Airport and Lhasa Gonggar Airport
- Launched Shoucheng Supercharge Energy Technology Co., entering the green energy sector
- Invested in X Square Robot, supporting China's advanced robotics ecosystem

== Corporate affairs ==
Shoucheng Holdings is majority owned and controlled by Shougang Group, a state-owned enterprise under the People’s Government of Beijing Municipality. As of 2024, the largest shareholders include:

- Shougang Holding (Hong Kong) Limited – direct controlling shareholder
- Public shareholders – traded via the Hong Kong Stock Exchange under stock code SEHK: 697

The company is governed by a board of directors chaired by Zhao Tianyang. It is headquartered in Hong Kong with operations concentrated in mainland China.
