= Tangsteel Group =

Chinese steel manufacturer

Tangshan Iron and Steel Group Company Limited 唐山钢铁集团有限公司
- Type: State-owned enterprise
- Industry: Steel manufacturing
- Founded: 1943; 83 years ago
- Headquarters: Tangshan, Hebei, People's Republic of China
- Area served: People's Republic of China
- Key people: Chairman and party secretary: Mr. Wang Yifang
- Products: Steel plates, sheets, bars, wire rod
- Parent: Hesteel Group
- Website: Tangshan Iron and Steel Group Company Limited

Tangshan Iron and Steel Group Company Limited, or Tangsteel, founded in 1943 and headquartered in Tangshan, Hebei, is one of the largest steel manufacturing state-owned enterprise in China. Its subsidiary and listed company, Tangshan Iron and Steel Company Limited (SZSE: 000709) was established in 1994 and it was listed on the Shenzhen Stock Exchange in 1997.

In 2005 it formed a joint venture Jingtang United Iron and Steel with Shougang Group. Tangsteel Group owned 49%.

In 2006, Tangsteel merged with Xuanhua Iron & Steel Group and Chengde Iron and Steel Group to form "New Tangsteel Iron and Steel Group". In 2008, Tangsteel merged with Hansteel Group to form "Hebei Iron and Steel Group", which is the largest steel maker in China and the fifth largest in the world.

In 2010 the Jingtang United Iron & Steel was sold back to Shougang Group.

== Link ==
- Tangshan Iron and Steel Group Company Limited
- Tangshan Iron and Steel Company Limited
