= Elizabeth DeLong =

American biostatistician

Elizabeth Ray DeLong
- Occupation: Biostatistician

Academic background
- Education: University of Maine; University of North Carolina at Chapel Hill
- Thesis: Estimation of General Parameters using Progressively Truncated U-Statistics
- Doctoral advisor: Pranab K. Sen

Academic work
- Discipline: Biostatistics
- Sub-discipline: Outcomes research; Comparative effectiveness research

Elizabeth Ray DeLong is an American biostatistician. She is a professor of biostatistics and bioinformatics at Duke University, where she chairs the Department of Biostatistics and Bioinformatics and is affiliated with the Duke Clinical Research Institute and Duke Cancer Institute.

== Education ==
DeLong graduated from the University of Maine in 1969, and earned a master's degree there in 1970. She completed her Ph.D. in 1979 at the University of North Carolina at Chapel Hill. Her dissertation, supervised by Pranab K. Sen, was Estimation of General Parameters using Progressively Truncated U-Statistics.

== Career ==
After completing her doctorate, she joined Duke as a statistician in Community and Family Medicine and in the Duke Comprehensive Cancer Center in 1979. In 1987, she left academia to work in industry as directory of biostatistics at Quintiles, but returned as an assistant professor in Community and Family Medicine in 1991, and added a joint appointment in Anesthesiology in 1996. In 2001 she moved to the Department of Biostatistics and Bioinformatics. She has been chair of the department since 2007.

In 2013, DeLong was elected as a Fellow of the American Statistical Association.

== Research interests ==
Her interests in the applications of statistics include outcomes research and comparative effectiveness research, and she has also published highly cited work in mathematical statistics on nonparametric methods for comparing the areas under correlated receiver operating characteristic curves.
