= USS DeLong =

USS DeLong may refer to the following ships of the United States Navy:

- USS DeLong (TB-28), a torpedo boat, launched in 1900 and sold in 1920
- USS DeLong (DD-129), a Wickes-class destroyer, launched in 1918 and sold in 1922
- USS DeLong (DE-684), a Rudderow-class destroyer escort, launched in 1943 and struck in 1969
