= Pangang Group Vanadium Titanium & Resources =

Chinese manufacturing company

Pangang Group Vanadium Titanium & Resources Co., Ltd. 攀鋼集團釩鈦資源股份有限公司
- Type: State-owned enterprise
- Industry: Iron, steel and vanadium manufacturing
- Founded: 1993
- Headquarters: Panzhihua, Sichuan, People's Republic of China
- Area served: People's Republic of China
- Key people: Chairman: Mr. Fan Zhengwei; General manager: Mr. Zhang Dade
- Parent: Panzhihua Iron and Steel
- Website: www.pgvt.cn

Pangang Group Vanadium Titanium & Resources Co., Ltd. (SZSE: 000629), parented by Panzhihua Iron and Steel, involves in the manufacture and sales of iron, steel and vanadium products. It is headquartered in Panzhihua, Sichuan, China.

It was established in 1993 with the name of Pangang Group Steel Plate Company Limited. It was listed on the Shenzhen Stock Exchange in 1996. Its name was changed to Panzhihua New Steel & Vanadium Company Limited in 1998 and changed its name to Pangang Group Vanadium Titanium and Resources Co., Ltd. in August 2013.
