= Michael P. DeLong =

United States Marine Corps general (1945–2018)

Michael DeLong
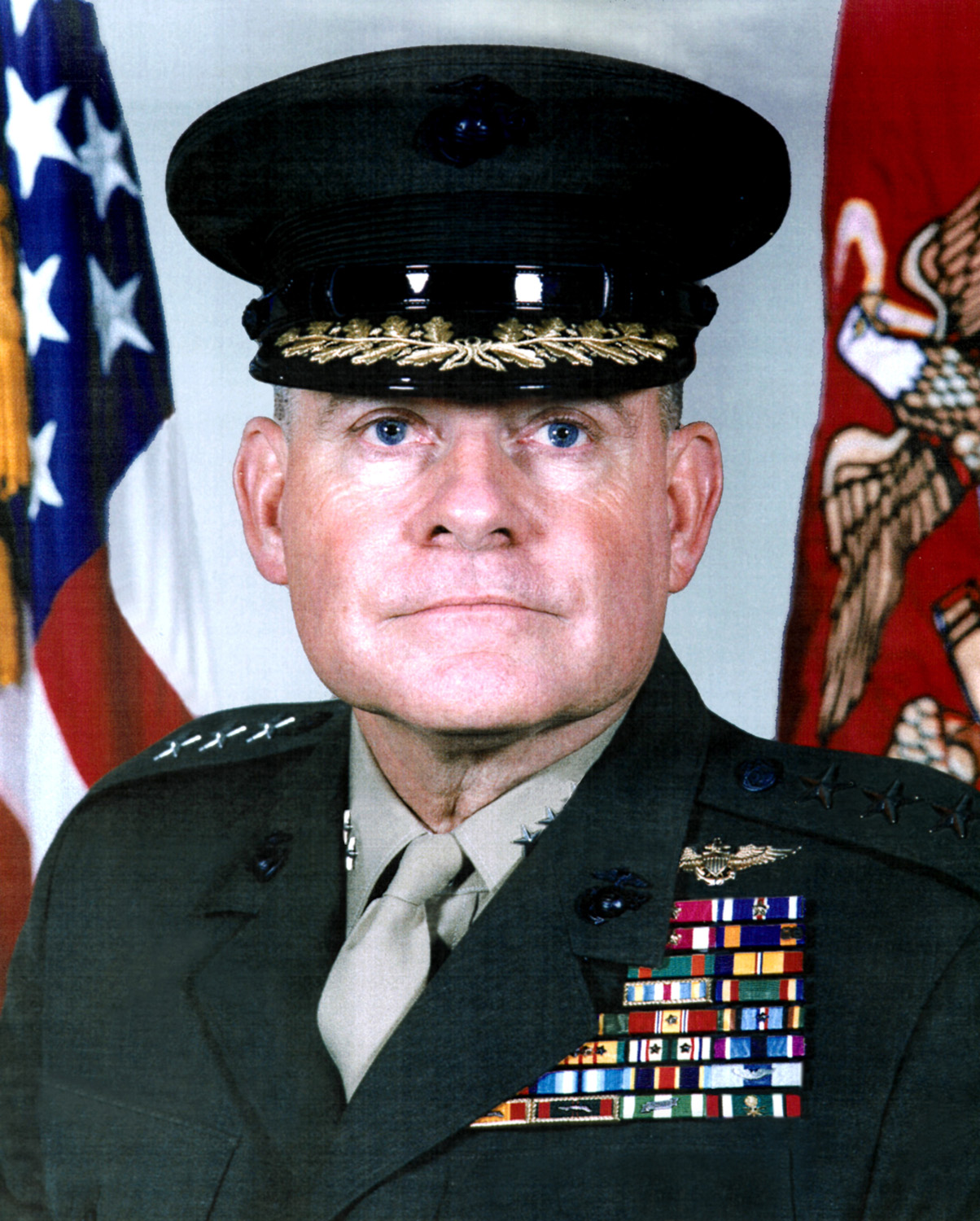
- Born: Michael Phillip DeLong; March 15, 1945
- Died: July 27, 2018 (aged 73); Treasure Island, Florida, U.S.
- Burial place: Arlington National Cemetery
- Relatives: Phillip C. DeLong (father)
- Military career
- Allegiance: United States
- Branch: United States Marine Corps
- Service years: 1967–2003
- Rank: Lieutenant General
- Nickname: "Rifle"
- Commands: 3rd Marine Air Wing
- Conflicts: Vietnam War; Operations Desert Shield/Desert Storm; Operation Restore Hope; Operation Iraqi Freedom; Operation Enduring Freedom
- Awards: Defense Distinguished Service Medal, Defense Superior Service Medal (2), Legion of Merit (2), Distinguished Flying Cross (2)

Michael Phillip "Rifle" DeLong (March 15, 1945 – July 27, 2018) was a United States Marine Corps lieutenant general who served as deputy commander, United States Central Command, at MacDill Air Force Base, Florida. From 2000 until his retirement in 2003 (with over 36 years of service), DeLong was second-in-command to General Tommy Franks, who, as commander of United States Central Command, was in charge of the war on terror, including Operation Iraqi Freedom in Iraq and Operation Enduring Freedom in Afghanistan.

== Biography ==
DeLong was a graduate of the United States Naval Academy and held a master's degree in industrial management from Central Michigan University.

DeLong's operational assignments include tours with HMM-262, Quang Tri, Republic of Vietnam; Standardization Instructor, HT-18, Naval Aviation Training Command; maintenance officer, HML-367, where he participated in Operation Eagle Pull, the evacuation of Phnom Penh and Operation Frequent Wind the evacuation of Saigon; operations officer, Marine Heavy Helicopter Squadron (HMH); officer-in-charge, HML 367, Detachment C; executive officer and special projects officer, Marine Air Base Squadron 24; plans and operations officer, Marine Air Group 36; executive officer and commanding officer, Marine Air Group 30; executive officer, MAG-26; commanding officer, HMM-266; executive officer and commanding officer, Marine Aviation Weapons/Tactics Squadron 1 (MAWTS-1), where he participated in Operations Desert Shield/Desert Storm; assistant chief of staff, operations, 3rd Marine Aircraft Wing, where he served as the Joint Force Air Component Commander (JFACC) for Operation Restore Hope in Somalia; deputy commanding general, I Marine Expeditionary Force, Marine Corps Base Camp Pendleton, California; deputy commander and acting commander, United States Marine Corps Forces Atlantic, in Norfolk, Virginia, and his previous duty as commander, 3rd Marine Air Wing, Marine Corps Air Station Miramar, California. His principal staff assignments include officer-in-charge, Fleet Marine Force, Pacific Command Center; Intelligence Requirements Officer, Fleet Marine Force, Pacific; aide-de-camp to the deputy commander, Fleet Marine Force, Pacific; arms control/strategic weapons action officer in the Strategic Requirements Branch of the Plans Division, Headquarters Marine Corps; and the director for joint training (J-7) and director of Joint Training Analyses and Simulation Center, U.S. Atlantic Command. DeLong's professional education includes the Basic School, Naval Flight School, Amphibious Warfare School, Defense Intelligence School, Armed Forces Staff College, Army War College and a Defense Department fellowship at the Brookings Institution. DeLong also held an honorary Doctor of Strategic Intelligence from the Joint Military Intelligence College.

DeLong's personal decorations include two awards of the Defense Distinguished Service Medal, two awards of the Defense Superior Service Medal, two awards of the Legion of Merit, two awards of the Distinguished Flying Cross, two awards of the Meritorious Service Medal, Air Medal with Flight Strike Numerals 69, Navy Achievement Medal and the Combat Action Ribbon. DeLong logged more than 5,600 flight hours in all models of aircraft and more than 800 combat hours. DeLong died of a heart attack in Treasure Island, Florida, on July 27, 2018, at the age of 73. He is buried at Arlington National Cemetery in Virginia.

Military offices
| Preceded by ??? | Deputy Commander of the United States Central Command; 200?–2003 | Succeeded by Lance L. Smith |
