= Hansteel =

Chinese iron and steel enterprise

Handan Iron and Steel Group Company Limited 邯郸钢铁集团有限公司
- Type: State-owned enterprise
- Industry: Steel manufacturing
- Founded: 1958; 68 years ago
- Headquarters: Handan, Hebei, People's Republic of China
- Area served: People's Republic of China
- Key people: Chairman and party secretary: Mr. Liu Yujun
- Parent: Hesteel Group
- Website: Handan Iron and Steel Group Company Limited

Handan Iron and Steel Group or Hansteel is a state-owned iron and steel enterprise engaging in the manufacturing, processing, and sale of black metal, billet, steel rolling, carbamide, sintering mineral, metallurgical machinery parts, and coke. It was established in 1958 and it is headquartered in Handan, Hebei, China.

Its subsidiary company, Handan Iron and Steel Company Limited (SSE: 600001), was established in 1996 and was listed on the Shanghai Stock Exchange in 1998.

In 2008, Hansteel merged with Tangsteel Group of Tangshan, Hebei, to become Hebei Iron and Steel Group, which is the fifth largest steel producer in the world. Their listed subsidiaries were also merged to form Hebei Iron and Steel Company.
