= Phillip C. DeLong =

US Marine officer

Phillip Cunliffe DeLong
- Born: July 9, 1919; Jackson, Michigan, U.S.
- Died: July 1, 2006 (aged 86); The Villages, Florida, U.S.
- Relatives: Michael P. DeLong (son)
- Military career
- Allegiance: United States of America
- Branch: United States Marine Corps
- Service years: 1942–1969
- Rank: Colonel
- Units: VMF-212; VMF-312
- Conflicts: World War II; Solomon Islands campaign; Korean War
- Awards: Silver Star; Legion of Merit; Distinguished Flying Cross (7); Air Medal (17)

Phillip Cunliffe DeLong (July 9, 1919 – July 1, 2006) was a highly decorated United States Marine Corps officer. He was a flying ace credited with shooting down over 11 enemy aircraft during World War II and two more during the Korean War.

== Early life and World War II ==
Phillip C. DeLong was born on July 9, 1919, in Jackson, Michigan. DeLong joined the Marine Corps on March 26, 1942. In December, he was commissioned as a second lieutenant and earned his flying wings. By August 1943, DeLong was assigned to Marine Fighting Squadron 212 (VMF-212) in the Solomon Islands. By late-October, VMF-212 was based at Barakoma Airfield. About one month later, the squadron moved to Torokina Airfield.

In the Solomon Islands, First Lieutenant DeLong flew the F4U Corsair and participated in bomber escort missions at Rabaul and Bougainville, where he shot down enemy planes which were attempting to down friendly bombers. These missions inflicted a great amount of damage on Japanese held airfields, shorelines, and ships. He also volunteered for strafing missions against heavily defended Japanese positions.

On February 15, 1944, Lieutenant DeLong was on an aerial patrol providing overwatch for friendly troops landing on Green Island. When Japanese bombers were located approaching friendly ships, DeLong unhesitatingly flew through American anti-aircraft fire to engage the enemy planes. DeLong personally shot down three enemy planes and helped prevent the bombers from inflicting damage on our ships.

By mid-February, Lieutenant DeLong had downed eight Japanese planes and established himself as a flying ace. He also claimed to have probably downed a ninth enemy plane and he damaged two others. DeLong continued flying combat missions over the Bismarck Archipelago until April. DeLong was credited with downing a total of 11 2/3 enemy aircraft during the war. He was awarded a total of four Distinguished Flying Crosses.

== Korean War ==
During the Korean War, Captain DeLong was assigned to Marine Fighter Squadron 312 (VMF-312). From September to November 1950, DeLong provided close air support for friendly ground forces, destroying many enemy vehicles and personnel.

On April 21, 1951, Captain DeLong was leading his section of F4U Corsairs on a reconnaissance mission over North Korea when they were attacked by four enemy YAK-9 aircraft. DeLong quickly retaliated against the enemy, downing two aircraft in three minutes. Another Marine in his flight, First Lieutenant Harold Daigh, downed a third plane.

These were the first Marine aerial victories during the war, and DeLong is believed to be the only pilot to shoot down enemy planes in two different wars with the same type of aircraft. DeLong was awarded the Silver Star for his actions on that day. He was also awarded three more Distinguished Flying Crosses during the war.

== Later life ==
DeLong retired from the Marines as a colonel in 1969, after 27 years of service. He was awarded the Legion of Merit upon his retirement. DeLong had flown nearly 200 combat missions during his career, made 171 aircraft carrier landings, and logged over 5,000 flight hours. His son, Michael Phillip DeLong, also served as a pilot in the Marine Corps, retiring as a lieutenant general in 2003.

DeLong and his wife settled down in The Villages, Florida. Phillip C. DeLong died on July 1, 2006. The Marine Corps League Detachment 1267 in The Villages was named in his honor.

== Awards ==

Naval Aviator Badge
Silver Star		Legion of Merit
Distinguished Flying Cross w/ one 5/16" silver star and 5/16" gold star	Air Medal w/ three 5/16" silver stars and one 5/16" gold star	Navy and Marine Corps Commendation Medal
Combat Action Ribbon w/ 5/16" gold star	Navy and Marine Corps Presidential Unit Citation	Air Force Presidential Unit Citation
American Campaign Medal	Asiatic-Pacific Campaign Medal w/ three 3/16" bronze stars	World War II Victory Medal
Navy Occupation Service Medal w/ 'Japan' clasp	National Defense Service Medal w/ 3/16" bronze star	Korean Service Medal w/ two 3/16" bronze stars
Republic of Korea Presidential Unit Citation	United Nations Korea Medal	Republic of Korea War Service Medal

=== Silver Star citation ===
Citation:

The President of the United States of America takes pleasure in presenting the Silver Star to Captain Phillip Cunliffe DeLong, United States Marine Corps, for conspicuous gallantry and intrepidity as a Section Leader and Pilot in Marine Fighter Squadron THREE HUNDRED TWELVE (VMF-312), in action against enemy aggressor forces in the vicinity of the Taedong-Gang Estuary, Korea, on 21 April 1951. Suddenly attacked from above by four enemy fighter aircraft while leading his section on a reconnaissance mission and carrying a full load of bombs, rockets and ammunition, Captain DeLong immediately jettisoned his external load and, although his plane was damaged during the initial aerial assault, effectively organized his flight to assume the offensive. Quickly attaining the advantage, he skillfully pressed an attack and, within a period of approximately three minutes, shot down two hostile planes. As a result of his skilled airmanship and tactical ability, his flight destroyed three of the enemy aircraft and severely damaged the fourth. By his marked courage, brilliant airmanship and steadfast devotion to duty, Captain DeLong upheld the highest traditions of the United States Naval Service.
