= Delong Steel =

Chinese steel company

- Type: Private
- Traded as: SSE: 000593
- Industry: Steel
- Founded: 1992; 34 years ago
- Headquarters: Nanshimen, China
- Area served: East and Southeast Asia, Europe
- Key people: Ding Liguo (CEO)
- Revenue: US$33.5 billion (2023)
- Number of employees: 46,403 (2023)
- Website: delongsteel.com

Delong Steel
- Traditional Chinese: 德龍鋼鐵有限公司
- Simplified Chinese: 德龙钢铁有限公司
- Literal meaning: Benevolent Dragon Steel
Transcriptions
Standard Mandarin
- Hanyu Pinyin: délóng gāngtiě yǒuxiàn gōngsī
- IPA: [tɤ̌.lʊ̌ŋ]

The Shanghai Delong Steel Group Co., Ltd (Chinese: 德龙钢铁, tuh-lung), known as Delong Steel, is a Chinese steel company based in Hebei province.

One of the world's largest steel producers, Delong was ranked 12th in the world, producing 27.9 million tonnes of steel in 2022. Forbes ranked it as the world's 451st largest company, with annual revenues of over US$33 billion.

== History ==
The company was founded in 1992 as Teamsphere Ltd., becoming Delong in 2000. Evraz acquired a minority share in 2008, which it sold to Best Decade Holdings Ltd. in 2018.

One of their plants in Xingtai produces 3 million tonnes per annum.

In 2020, the company opened a steel history museum in Xindu, Xingtai. Delong has also opened the Delong Steel Art Park in Laoting County.

Delong produces high-quality carbon structural steel, low-alloy high-strength structural steel, hot-rolled coils, and special steel plates for pipelines. In 2022 it was first listed in the Fortune Global 500 and announced plans for a plant in Zimbabwe.

== See also ==
- List of steel producers
