= Beijing Shougang Co., Ltd. =

Chinese steel manufacturer

- Type: Subsidiary
- Traded as: SZSE: 000959
- Industry: Steel manufacturing
- Founded: 1999
- Founder: Shougang Corporation
- Headquarters: Beijing, China
- Area served: China
- Key people: Jin Wei (chairman)
- Revenue: ▼CN¥17.8 billion (2015)
- Operating income: ▼ (CN¥1.6 billion) (2015)
- Net income: ▼ (CN¥1.1 billion) (2015)
- Total assets: ▲CN¥66.5 billion (2015)
- Total equity: ▼CN¥23.3 billion (2015)
- Owner: Shougang Group (79.40%)
- Parent: Shougang Group
- Subsidiaries: Jingtang United Iron & Steel (51%)

Chinese name
- Simplified Chinese: 北京首钢股份有限公司
- Traditional Chinese: 北京首鋼股份有限公司
- Literal meaning: Beijing Shougang Company Limited by Shares
Transcriptions
Standard Mandarin
- Hanyu Pinyin: Běijīng shǒugāng gǔfèn yǒuxiàn gōngsī

short name
- Simplified Chinese: 首钢股份
- Traditional Chinese: 首鋼股份
- Literal meaning: Shougang Share
Transcriptions
Standard Mandarin
- Hanyu Pinyin: shǒugāng gǔfènī
- Website: www.sggf.com.cn
- Footnotes in a consolidated basis

Beijing Shougang Co., Ltd. is a listed Chinese steel manufacturer. It also a subsidiary of Shougang Group. The shares of Beijing Shougang float in the Shenzhen Stock Exchange.

Beijing Shougang was a constituent of SZSE 1000 Index (as well as sub-index SZSE 700 Index) but not in SZSE Component Index, making the company was ranked between the 501st to 1,000th by free float adjusted market capitalization.

== Business overview ==
The company operated Shougang Group's first steel plant in Shijingshan District. The plant closed in 2009. On 23 April 2015 Beijing Shougang Limited acquired 51% stake of "Jingtang United Iron and Steel" from the parent company, a steel plant in Caofeidian District, Tangshan, Hebei Province, for 9.718 billion RMB cash, plus the 100% stake of a division in Guizhou Province. (Chinese: 贵州首钢产业投资有限公司)

=== Jingtang United Iron and Steel ===
Shougang Jingtang United Iron & Steel Co., Ltd. (Chinese: 首钢京唐钢铁联合有限责任公司) was a joint venture between Shougang Group (51%) and Tangsteel Group (49%). The steel plant was built on modern technology as well as acquiring equipment from overseas, such as from Siemens. It was mentioned in the 11th Five-year plan. In 2010 Tangsteel Group sold the minority interests to Shougang Group. After a net loss of 3.65 billion RMB and 1.76 billion RMB in 2012 and 2013 respectively, the company made a net profit of 124 million RMB in 2014.

In 2015 51% stake of the steel plant was injected to Shougang Group's listed subsidiary Beijing Shougang Co., Ltd., which the subsidiary paid the parent company mostly in cash. Shougang Group retained 49% stake directly.

== Equity investments ==
As of 31 December 2016

- BAIC Motor (13.54%)
