= Meng Tai =

Chinese model worker and NPC member

Meng Tai (1898–1967) was a Chinese model worker, member of the National People's Congress, and vice director of an Anshan Iron and Steel Company (Angang) iron factory.

== Biography ==
Meng Tai was born in Hebei province in 1898. Meng moved to Manchuria in 1916 and began working at Anshan Ironworks (which was then-Japanese owned) in 1926.

Authorities praised Meng for enduring hardship to "collect and store thousands of possibly usable bits of scrap, down to nails, pegs or strings of iron wire, and made his co-workers follow his example." Meng amassed a collection of machine parts which were critical for restoring Angang's Blast Furnace No. 2 in late 1948. The blast furnace was then nicknamed, "Meng Tai warehouse".

He joined the Chinese Communist Party (CCP) in 1949 and thereafter rose to high ranks at Angang.

On 25 September 1950, Meng was recognized as a model worker representative and met Mao Zedong in Beijing.

Meng was a member of the first National People's Congress in 1954.

In 1957, Meng was appointed the vice director of one of Angang's iron factories. Meng was recognized as a National Model Worker in 1959.

Meng died in September 1967.

== Reception ==
Academic Koji Hirata describes Meng as a product of the CCP's "efforts to transform an underprivileged laborer into a model PRC citizen."

In 1986, Angang's Party Committee erected a statue of Meng in front of Angang's main office.

In 1991, Angang established Meng Tai Memorial Hall.

In 1993, a statute of Meng was erected in Lishan Park in Anshan. The next year, the park was renamed Meng Tai Park.

An adaptation of his experiences appear in the 2022 film Steel Will.

== See also ==
- Technological and industrial history of China
