= Hesteel Group =

Chinese iron and steel manufacturing conglomerate

Hesteel Group 河北钢铁集团有限公司
- Type: State-owned enterprise
- Industry: Iron and Steel
- Founded: 2008; 18 years ago
- Headquarters: 385 Sports South Avenue, Shijiazhuang, Hebei, China
- Area served: China, Serbia
- Revenue: ▲CN¥284.5 billion (2015)
- Operating income: ▼CN¥570.9 million (2015)
- Net income: ▼ (CN¥1.3 billion) (2015)
- Total assets: ▲CN¥348.8 billion (2015)
- Total equity: ▼CN¥48.6 billion (2015)
- Owner: Government of Hebei Province
- Parent: State-owned Assets Supervision and Administration Commission of the Government of Hebei Province
- Subsidiaries: See list
- Website: hbisco.com
- Footnotes in a consolidated basis

Hesteel Group Company Limited
- Simplified Chinese: 河钢集团有限公司
- Traditional Chinese: 河鋼集團有限公司
- Literal meaning: He-Steel Group Limited [Liability] Company
Transcriptions
Standard Mandarin
- Hanyu Pinyin: Hé gāng jítuán yǒuxiàn gōngsī

Hesteel Group Company Limited is a Chinese iron and steel manufacturing conglomerate, also known as Hesteel Group or its pinyin shortname Hegang. The company was also known as Hebei Iron and Steel Group Co., Ltd. or HBIS until 2016 (Chinese: 河北钢铁集团有限公司).

Hesteel Group is the fifth-largest steel producer in the world measured by crude steel output (after European-Indian conglomerate ArcelorMittal) in 2023, according to the World Steel Association (Chinese companies data was provided by China Iron and Steel Association). After the announcement of the merger of Baosteel Group and Wuhan Iron and Steel Corporation (WISCO) in September 2016, Baowu Steel Group's pro forma production volume in 2015 would be the second in the world, exceeding Hesteel Group. However, Hesteel Group, Baosteel Group and WISCO all announced the cut in production capacity, in response to the market demand and government policy, thus the final ranking could not be predicted.

By net assets, Baosteel Group's subsidiary was already exceeding the net assets of Hesteel Group as of 31 December 2015.

Hesteel Group had a second-tier subsidiary listed at the Shenzhen Stock Exchange, Hesteel Company, which is controlled by the direct subsidiaries Hansteel Group and Tangsteel Group of Hesteel Group.

== History ==
Hebei Iron and Steel Group Co., Ltd. was established on 30 June 2008 by the merger of Tangshan Iron and Steel Group and Handan Iron and Steel Group of Hebei Province.

The company had an indirectly listed subsidiary, Hesteel Company, which was known as Hebei Iron and Steel Company until June 2016.

See history of Hesteel Group (Hebei Iron and Steel) since 1918.

== Subsidiaries ==
- Tangsteel Group (100%)
- Hansteel Group (100%)
- Shijiazhuang Iron and Steel (100%)
- Hesteel Company (60.32%, SZSE: 000709)
- Hesteel Serbia (Železara Smederevo)
- Chengsteel in Chengde
- Xuansteel
- Wugang Steel
- Hengshui Thin Steel
- Jingtang
- Hesteel Group Mining
- Guomao Company
- Caida Securities
- Palabora Mining Company Ltd
