= DeLong, Pleasants County, West Virginia =

Unincorporated community in West Virginia, United States

Delong
- Unincorporated community
- Location within the state of West Virginia Delong (the United States)
- Coordinates: 39°24′5″N 81°9′45″W
- Country: United States
- State: West Virginia
- County: Pleasants
- Elevation: 614 ft (187 m)
- Time zone: UTC-5 (Eastern (EST))
  - Summer (DST): UTC-4 (EDT)
- GNIS ID: 1554273

Delong is an unincorporated community in Pleasants County, West Virginia, United States.
