= Hunan Valin Steel =

Chinese state-owned company

Hunan Valin Steel Co., Ltd. is a Chinese state-owned company based in Changsha. Founded in 1997, it is primarily engaged in the smelting, manufacture and sale of iron and steel products, as well as nonferrous metal products. As of 8 November 2016, the company was a constituent of SZSE 1000 Index (as well as sub-index SZSE 700 Index) but not in SZSE Component Index. With a market capitalization of $2.3 billion in May 2015, the company was ranked #1,858 on Forbes Global 2000 list.

According to its website, Valin Steel provides wide and heavy steel plates, hot-rolled steel plates, cold-rolled steel plates, galvanized plates, steel wires, steel rods, steel pipes, steel strips, sections, steel slabs, copper plate pipes and aluminum products, among others, which are applied in industries such as construction, light industry, automobile, bridge and shipbuilding, among others.

Valin Steel distributes its products in domestic and overseas markets. As of December 31, 2008, Valin Steel had 12 subsidiaries, involved in smelting of steel and nonferrous metal products, trading of relevant equipment, as well as financing services.

== Company developments ==
The company was listed on the Shenzhen Stock Exchange in 1999.

In 2005, Netherlands-registered Mittal Steel bought a 37.17% stake in Hunan Valin Steel Tube Wire, a subsidiary of Valin, for US$314m. The agreement marked the first investment by a major foreign steelmaker into an established Chinese steel company, and was regarded as a sign of the growing interest from foreign companies to get involved in the Chinese market.

In 2009, Hunan Valin Steel acquired a 16.5% stake in Australia's third biggest iron ore producer at the time, Fortescue Metals, for US$771 million. Through the acquisition, Valin Steel hoped for better access to Australia's mineral resource market.

Mittal Steel agreed to a joint venture with Hunan Valin Steel in 2014 to enter the Chinese car market. The joint venture went operational in June 2014 with an estimated annual production capacity of 1.5 million tonnes, producing various metal parts for chassis and wheels. According to a Mittal statement, the venture would supply steel to both international and domestic Chinese car makers, including Geely Automotive Holdings, Dongfeng Motor Group and Shanghai Auto.

Hunan Valin announced a major company restructuring in 2016, publishing plans to shift into financial services and electricity generation due to overcapacity in the Chinese steel market and reduced profits. To do so, the company plans to seek stakes in a number of financial and electricity companies, such as a 100% stake in Fortune Securities, a 96% stake in Hunan Trust, a 29.19% stake in Jixiang Life Insurance, a 100% stake in Xiangtan Valin Energy Saving Power Generation, as well as a 100% stake in Hunan Valin Energy Saving Power Generation.

This decision caused ArcelorMittal to transfer roughly 10% of its shares in Hunan Valin Steel, worth 1.1 billion yuan ($165.9 million), to the state-owned China Reform Fund. This represents ArcelorMittal's entire stake in Hunan Valin Steel.

See History of Hunan Valin Steel Group since 1997.
