= Angang Steel =

Chinese steel company

Angang Steel Company Limited
- Native name: 鞍钢股份有限公司
- Company type: Listed
- Traded as: SZSE: 000898; SEHK: 347
- Industry: Steel
- Founded: 1997
- Headquarters: Anshan, Liaoning, China
- Area served: China
- Key people: Old Chairman: Mr. Zhang Xiaoyang Liu Current Chairman: Yao Lin
- Products: Steel
- Parent: Anshan Iron and Steel Group
- Website: Angang Steel Company Limited

Angang Steel Company Limited known as Angang Steel or Ansteel is a joint-stock limited company parented by Anshan Iron and Steel Group, which is supervised by the State Council of the People's Republic of China. It is the second largest steel maker in Mainland China. "Angang" is the pinyin transcription of the company's Chinese short name 鞍钢 (Āngāng, meaning "saddle steel", because of its close ties to Anshan, Liaoning).

Ansteel is engaged in producing and selling steel products as billets, cold rolled sheets, color coating plates, wire rods, thick plates and heavy rails. It was incorporated in 1997 when Anshan Iron and Steel injected its cold rolling, wire rod, and thick plate operations into Ansteel. Ansteel is headquartered in Anshan.
