= Shandong Steel =

Chinese steel company

Shandong Steel 山东钢铁集团
- Industry: Steel industry
- Founded: 2008
- Headquarters: Jinan, China

Shandong Iron and Steel Group Co Ltd (Chinese: 山东钢铁集团), commonly known as Shandong Steel, is a Chinese steel company based in Jinan. 2015 it was ranked as 12th biggest steel producer of the world with a production of 21.7 million tonnes of steel. In 2009, it took a 67% stake in Rizhao Iron and Steel. SISG is controlled by the provincial government of Shandong. SISG was formed in March 2008 when the provincial government of Shandong merged two state-owned steel producers.

== History ==
The State-owned Shandong Iron and Steel Group Co Ltd was created out of the restructuring of Jinan Iron and Steel Group Co and Laiwu Steel Group Corp – the sixth- and seventh-largest steel makers in the country – and Shandong Metallurgical Industry Corp. The three belong to the Shandong provincial state assets management commission.

Shandong Iron and Steel has a registered capital of 10 billion yuan ($1.4 billion) and is fully state-owned.

Under the provincial steel industry plan, the group has an annual output of 31.6 million tons. In 2007, Jinan produced 12.12 million tons of crude steel and Laiwu turned out 11.7 million tons.

Luo Bingsheng, vice chairman of the China Iron and Steel Association, said that link-ups and restructuring of the steel industry had become a global trend and the new Shandong-based steel group would play an active role in the international competitiveness of the country's steel industry.

=== Jinan ===
Jinan Iron & Steel Company Ltd. was a company principally engaged in smelting, processing and sale of steel products. Jinan Iron & Steel provided steel products, including hot rolled ribbed steel bars, hull structure steel plates, thick steel plates, wide and heavy steel plates, deformed steel bars, steel profiles, steel billets, cold and hot rolled steel products, as well as coking products, among others. Jinan Iron & Steel was also involved in sale of dangerous chemical goods, distribution of coal gas, steel smelting technology consulting services, as well as marketing of iron ores and other ores.

=== Laiwu ===
Laiwu Steel Corporation was principally engaged in the manufacture and sale of pig iron, steel billets, steel ingots, steel products, coke and granulating slag and the supply of electricity and heat. During the year of 2008, Laiwu Steel Corp produced approximately 4.69 million metric tons of pig iron, 5.13 million metric tons of steel and 6.29 million metric tons of steel products. Laiwu Steel Corp distributed its products domestically and to overseas markets with eastern China as its major market. As of December 31, 2008, Laiwu Steel Corp had eight major subsidiaries and three associates.

=== Rizhao merger ===
According to China Securities Journal, SISG signed an agreement to take a 67% stake in Rizhao Iron and Steel. On September 6, 2009, Shandong Iron and Steel Group Co., Ltd. and Rizhao Steel Holding Group Co., Ltd. signed agreement on asset restructuring and cooperation, which marked the former's success in the reorganization. According to the agreement, both sides jointly reorganized the assets to the JV by means of a capital injection. SISG owns 67% stakes by cash, and Rizhao Steel holds 33% stock with net assets. Additionally, the agreement made clear the restructuring principles, means, the scope of assets, the evaluation of restructuring assets, the work processes, as well as staff placement. After signing the agreement, both sides will immediately start all evaluation works. The determined agreement between Shandong Steel and Rizhao Steel indicated both sides made substantial progress in asset reorganization and cooperation, as well as the strategy of Shandong's industry shift from the inland to coastal cities. Rizhao is founded and controlled by billionaire Du Shuanghua, who benefited from trading iron ore in Singapore.

The consolidation is part of a plan by the Shandong provincial government to streamline its steel sector, one of the country's largest and most fragmented. Rizhao and Shandong Iron and Steel had previously signed a letter of intent for consolidation in early November but the deal was abandoned in January after Kai Yuan Holdings Ltd, a property investment and heat energy supply company, bought about 30 percent of the core assets in Rizhao.

== See also ==
- List of steel producers
