= Jianlong Steel =

Private-owned enterprise

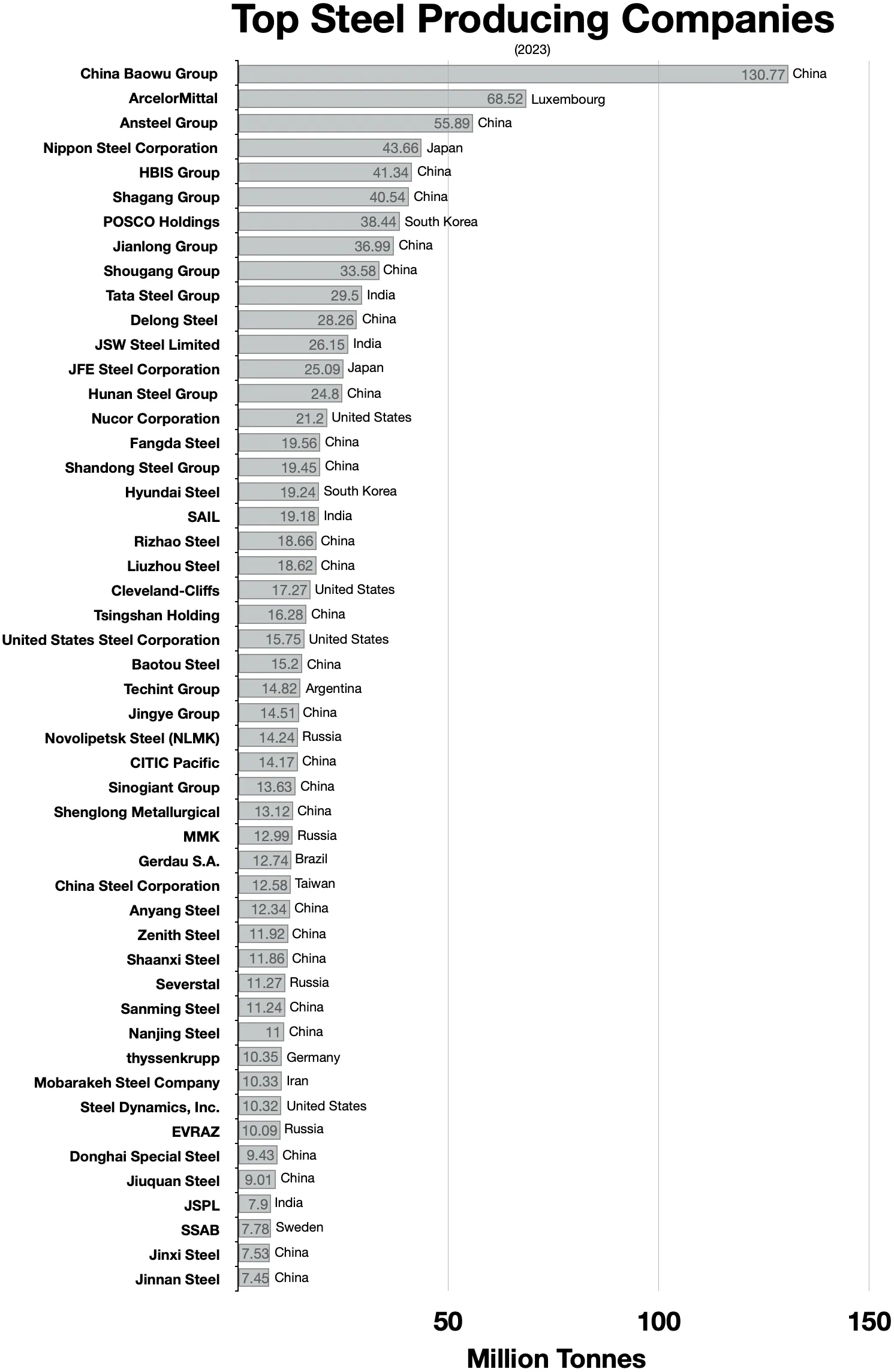
Top steel producing companies

Jianlong Steel is the largest private-owned enterprise in Tangshan, Hebei province, China with the output of crude steel 6.5 million tonnes in a year. The company was established in the year 2000, from near-bankrupt predecessor Zunhua Steel.

Tangshan Jianlong Steel is a subsidiary of the large domestic private enterprise Beijing Jianlong Group.

== See also ==
- List of steel producers
