= Panzhihua Iron and Steel =

Chinese state-owned company based in Sichuan

Panzhihua Iron and Steel (Group) Company Limited 攀枝花鋼鐵（集團）有限公司
- Logo after the reorganization of Ansteel Group and Pzhsteel Group

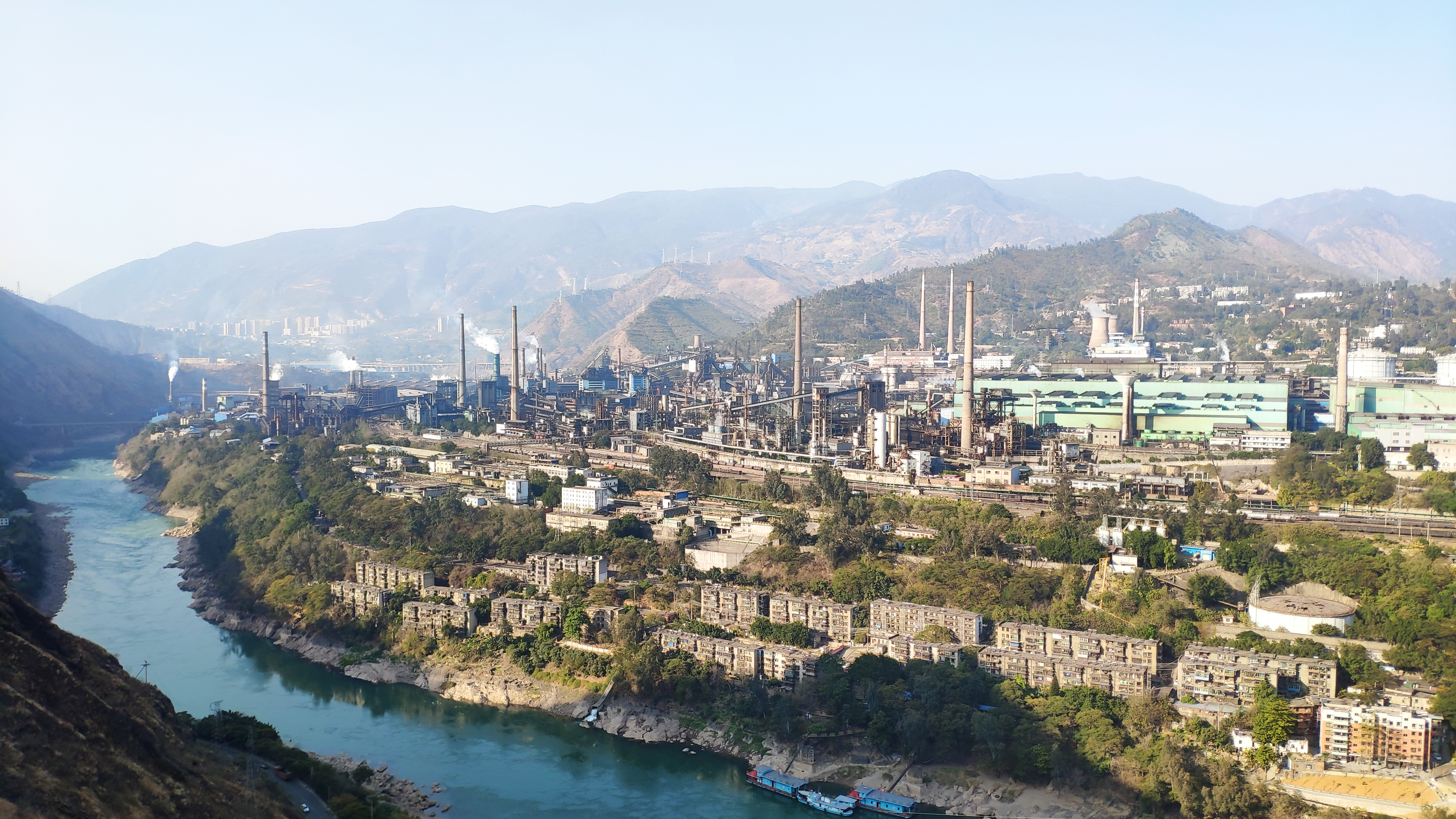
- Type: State-owned enterprise
- Industry: Steel manufacturing
- Founded: 1965
- Headquarters: Panzhihua, Sichuan, People's Republic of China
- Area served: People's Republic of China
- Key people: Party secretary: Mr. Xie Junyong 谢俊勇; General manager: Mr. Xu Shishuai 徐世帅
- Products: Steel, Vanadium, Titanium
- Subsidiaries: Panzhihua New Steel and Vanadium; Changcheng Special Steel; Chongqing Titanium
- Website: Panzhihua Iron and Steel (Group) Limited

Panzhihua Iron and Steel (Group) Company Limited, or Pangang, is a state-owned enterprise in Panzhihua, Sichuan, China. It is the largest steel maker in Western China. It is also the largest vanadium product manufacturer in China, and the second largest in the world. It has three subsidiaries listed on the Shenzhen Stock Exchange: Panzhihua New Steel and Vanadium (SZSE: 000629), Changcheng Special Steel (SZSE: 000569) and Chongqing Titanium (SZSE: 000515). In total, the firm has eight subsidiaries and associates, who are engaged in smelting, processing and distributing iron and steel as well as vanadium products (as of December 31, 2010).

== History ==
Panzhihua Steel was built as part of the Third Front campaign to develop basic industry and national defense industry in China's interior in order to be prepared for the risk of foreign invasion. Because planners chose locations based on military defense considerations, Panzhihua Steel was built on the side of a mountain, unlike most steel factories which are built on flat land. To ensure that the facility had the level foundation necessary for steel production, workers built the factory on massive steps carved out of the slope. Instead of the internal track system common to steel factories, technicians used a cable system to connect different parts of the facility to better adapt to the local terrain.

Consistent with the Third Front construction's emphasis on secrecy due to national security concerns, the completion of the Panzhihua facility was not promoted at the time. Today, the city government of Panzhihua promotes it as a model of Chinese technological ingenuity.

Panzhihua Steel built a hospital in 1970, and over the next eight years developed a gynecology ward, an ear, nose, and throat ward, and a pediatric ward. Its ratio of medical workers to workers exceeded 61 times the average ratio for rural areas.
