= Ansteel Group =

Chinese owned steel maker

Ansteel Group Corporation
- Ansteel logo with the stylised character for "worker", 工 (pinyin: gōng)

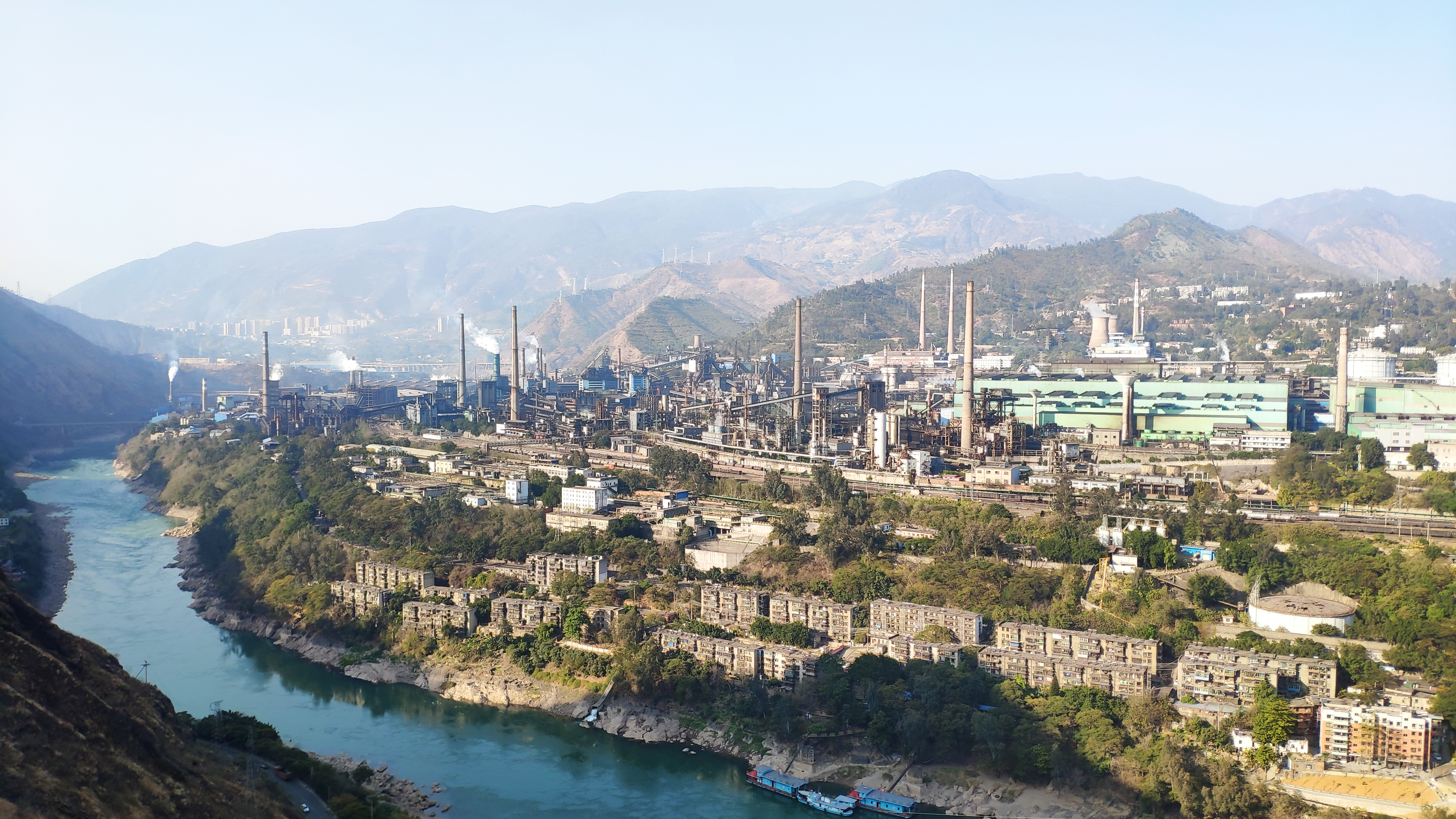
- Ansteel complex in Panzhihua
- Trade name: Ansteel Group
- Native name: 鞍钢集团
- Type: State-owned enterprise
- Industry: Steel manufacturing
- Founded: 1916; 110 years ago
- Headquarters: Anshan, Liaoning, China
- Area served: China
- Key people: Tan Chengxu (Chairman and Party Committee Secretary)
- Products: Steel
- Revenue: ▼US$33.894 billion (2025)
- Net income: US$-753.2 million (2025)
- Total assets: US$69.140 billion (2025)
- Owner: State-owned Assets Supervision and Administration Commission of the State Council
- Subsidiaries: Angang Steel (67.29%); Anshan Iron and Steel; Benxi Steel; Panzhihua Iron and Steel; Ling yuan Iron and Steel

Chinese name
- Simplified Chinese: 鞍山钢铁集团公司
- Traditional Chinese: 鞍山鋼鐵集團公司
Transcriptions
Standard Mandarin
- Hanyu Pinyin: Ānshān gāngtiě jítuán gōngsī
- Website: www.ansteel.cn
- Footnotes in a consolidated basis

Ansteel Group Corporation (Ansteel Group in short; less popularly Angang Group) is a Chinese state-owned steel making conglomerate. The corporation is under the supervision of State-owned Assets Supervision and Administration Commission of the State Council. It is headquartered in Anshan, Liaoning. According to the World Steel Association, the corporation was the 4th largest manufacturer of steel in the world by production volume in 2024/25.

The enterprise was established under Japanese colonial control in Manchuria as Anshan Iron & Steel Works, then Shōwa Steel Works. After Japan's defeat in the Second Sino-Japanese War, China's Nationalist government restructured it as a state-owned enterprise. Once the Communists gained control of Anshan in the Chinese Civil War, the enterprise was re-organized as Anshan Iron and Steel Company (Angang).

Angang was critical to the development of heavy industry during the early years of the People's Republic of China. During the Great Leap Forward and the Cultural Revolution, Angang was politically important in debates about worker democracy (especially through the Angang Constitution) and local control (as opposed to central control) over state-owned enterprises.

Since the 1990s the original enterprise has undergone a number of mergers and became the larger Ansteel conglomerate with multiple state-owned steelmakers across China as its subsidiaries, including the original Anshan Iron and Steel Company.

== History ==
The looted rolling mill of the plant, 1946

The origins of the group trace back to Anshan Iron & Steel Works, established in 1916 as a subsidiary of the South Manchuria Railway Company during Japanese rule in Northeast China and then renamed to Shōwa Steel Works in 1933. The United States bombed the strategically important plant repeatedly during World War 2, and much of it was then dismantled by the Soviet Union following the invasion of Japanese-occupied Manchuria.

When the Nationalist government assumed control of the region from 1946 to 1948, the steel works was among the Japanese-occupation enterprises that were nationalised and restructured, becoming Anshan Iron and Steel Company. Although they made an attempt to revive the plant, the blast furnaces and other key facilities were later destroyed by the Nationalists when they withdrew from the area in February 1948.

=== Early PRC ===
In 1951, the People's Republic of China and its Soviet advisors began the "Three Major Projects" of Angang, which included a Seamless-Pipe Factory, the Large Steel-Rolling Factory, and Blast Furnace No. 7. In May 1951, the PRC and the Soviet Union agreed for Soviet design of the Angang factories. The steel refinery was modified under the aid of Soviet Union as one of 156 important construction projects in the first five-year plan.

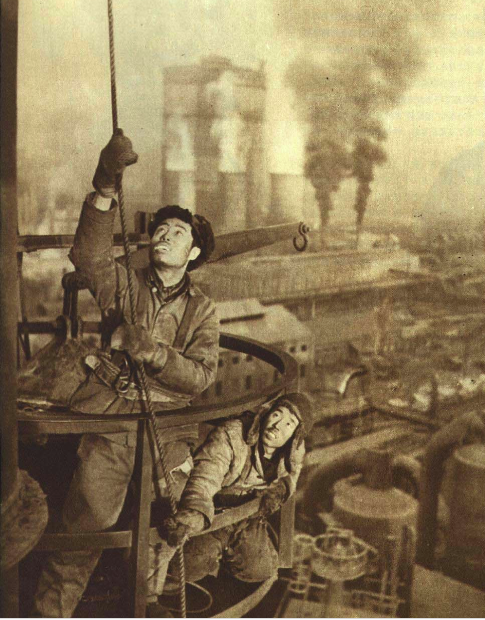
Building the blast furnace, 1952

As part of the early to mid-1950s trend towards centralizing control over SOEs, in January 1953, Angang became a central SOE under the Ministry of Heavy Industry. In June 1956, it was placed within the responsibility of the Ministry of Metallurgical Industry.

In 1958, prompted by the political movement of the Great Leap Forward, workers at Angang laid out rules to challenge the existing operations of their workplace. These ideas were reflected in the March 11, 1960, "Report of the Anshan City Committee Regarding the Beginning of the Movement for Technological Reform and Technological Revolution." On March 22, 1960, the Central Committee of the Chinese Communist Party approved the document and distributed it to various governmental bodies. Mao Zedong designated the document as the Angang Constitution and stated that its principles should guide the operation of state enterprises.

The Great Leap Forward significantly increased the power of Anshan's Party Committee over Angang and decreased the Ministry of Metallurgical Industry's authority over Angang.

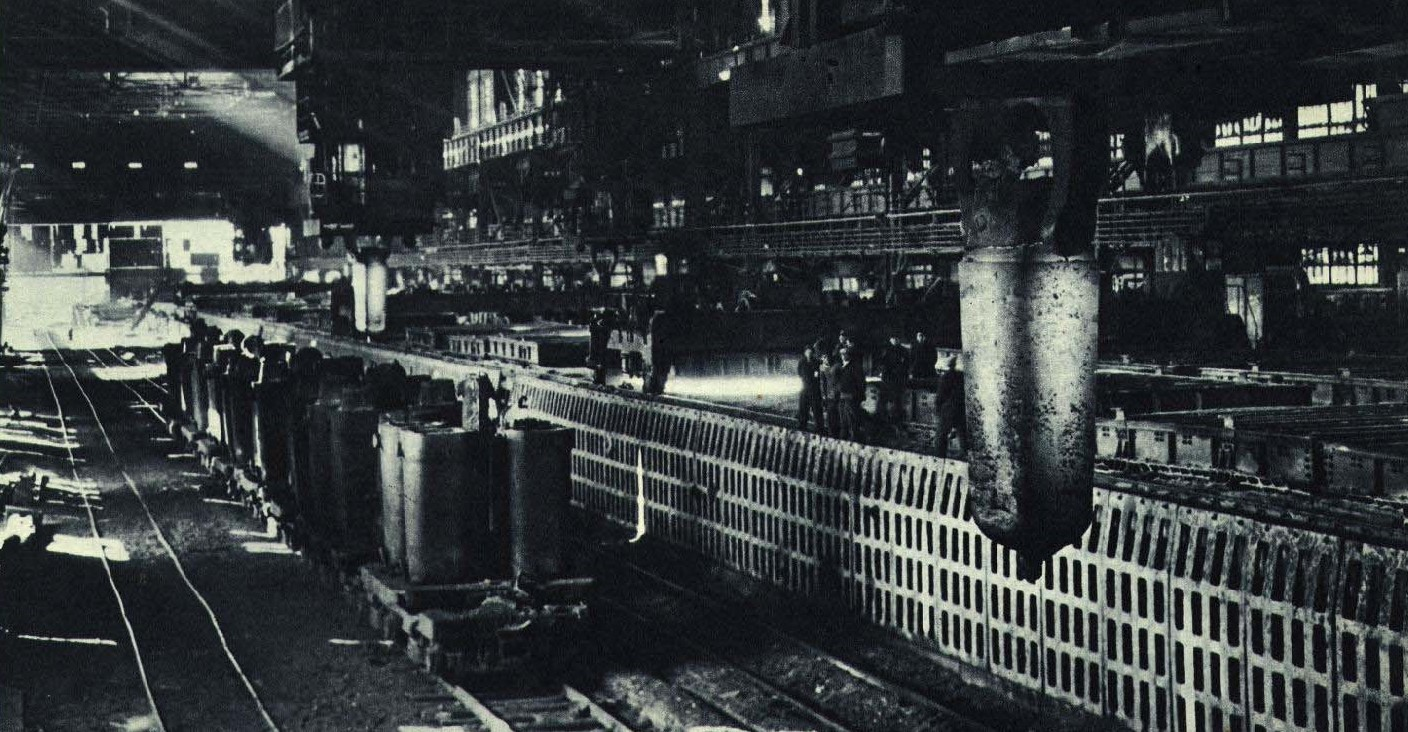
Ingots of Anshan steel, 1962

During the Great Leap Forward, Angang implemented both high-tech and low-tech initiatives. Angang made major investments to speed construction of 39 new advanced industrial facilities. Angang introduced a slogan during the Great Leap Forward that "It is all right not to sleep. It is all right not to eat. But it is not all right to fail to complete plans for iron and steel."

During this period, Angang produced the steel for the banquet and conference halls at the Great Hall of the People (one of the Ten Great Buildings).

In the early 1960s, Angang supported the construction of Vietnam's first modern steel enterprise, Thai Nguyen Iron and Steel Company. It sent experts to the steelworks and trained hundreds of Vietnamese workers. When American attacks later damaged the facilities, Angang worked on the restoration, including through manufacturing essential equipment.

During the Cultural Revolution, on 17 August 1967, the CCP Central Committee issued the Resolution on the Anshan Question which criticized the CCP Angang Committee and the CCP Anshan City Committee members as capitalist roaders. Three days later, the Anshan City Military Control Committee was established by the People's Liberation Army with Zhang Feng and Chen Shaokun as the Committee directors. The Committee implemented military control over both Angang and Anshan.

On 10 May 1969, the State Council removed Angang from under the authority of the Ministry of Metallurgical Industry and instead placed it under the authority of the Liaoning Provincial Revolutionary Committee. This approach to localizing control over a large-scale SOE was subsequently promoted as a model for other SOEs, with the government placing 2,400 more (including Daqing Oil Field and Changchun Auto Manufacturing) within provincial or local control in 1970.

On 24 July 1969, the Anshan Revolutionary Committee combined Angang and Anshan's operations, including combining the enterprise's housing and medical departments into the city's departments, among others.

In the early 1970s, Angang provided technological support to Romania and to Pakistan.

Through its targeting of cadres of in industrial enterprises and economic organs, the Criticize Lin, Criticize Confucius campaign created turmoil at Angang in July 1974.

On 15 October 1975, the CCP and the central government approved the reestablishment of both Angang and the CCP Anshan City Committee. In November 1975, Anshan was re-established as an enterprise.

=== After Reform and Opening Up ===
After Reform and Opening Up, like much of the industry in China's northeast, Angang began lagging in economic activity. By the 1980s, Angang's industrial site had become overly dense and disorganized, with most new construction projects requiring the relocation of other projects. In this period, relocation costs accounted for 40–50% of Angang's investment costs.

Beginning in 1988, Angang started to obtain foreign loans and World Bank loans in order to support its technological development, the importation of equipment, and environmental protection work.

In 1994, Angang was in poor financial condition. Angang's leadership sought financial help from Zhu Rongji, who informed Angang's leadership that the government could not provide further funding and that the best solution was to issue stock to be sold on the Hong Kong stock market. Angang's deficit made selling shares in the company not viable, and therefore it packaged its better assets and conducted a partial public offering. In 1997, Angang placed its profitable factories within a new subsidiary, Angang New Steel Rolling Limited (ANSRL). Less than half the shares in ANSRL were listed for sale, which allowed the subsidiary to remain majority owned by Angang. The offering attracted little interest in the market, and the state-owned securities broker Everbright Securities purchased the unsold ANSRL shares.

In 1997, a subsidiary Angang Steel was incorporated and listed some of the assets of the group in the stock exchanges.

Responding to increasing domestic demand from industries like shipbuilding, in 1993 Angang completed a heavy plate plant which became the largest heavy plate plant in China at the time.

In 2010 Panzhihua Iron and Steel was merged into Anshan Iron & Steel Group Corporation.

In June 2010 Anshan Iron announced it had signed an agreement with Jilin Horoc for the long-term supply of nickel. Anshan intended to get into the stainless steel and specialty metals industry.

In August 2021, Ansteel and Angang Group Corporation, began the process of merging and restructuring that will create the world's third-largest steelmaker. According to the deal, Angang will become a subsidiary of Ansteel.

Angang is one of the major SOEs under the supervision of SASAC.

== Cultural narratives ==
In 1952, filmmaker and writer Yu Min relocated to Anshan to create films and other works celebrating Angang.

Academic Koji Hirata writes, "[T]hrough museums, essays, films, and television series, Angang symbolizes a golden age of Northeastern industry, when the region's SOEs were at the vanguard of China's steelmaking, auto manufacturing, coal mining and other industries vital for building socialism." A fictional enterprise based on Angang is at the center of the 2023 TV series The Long Season.

Meng Tai is among the most celebrated model workers from Angang. Meng's experiences at Angang are portrayed in the 2022 film Steel Will.

The Communist Party portrays the development of Angang and industry in the northeast as part of its history of building the Chinese nation. In 2017, Angang was among the initial "national industrial heritages" designated by the government.

== See also ==
- Masteel Group
- Technological and industrial history of China
- Industry of China
