= Shougang Group =

Chinese steel and mining conglomerate

Shougang Group Co., Ltd. 首钢集团有限公司

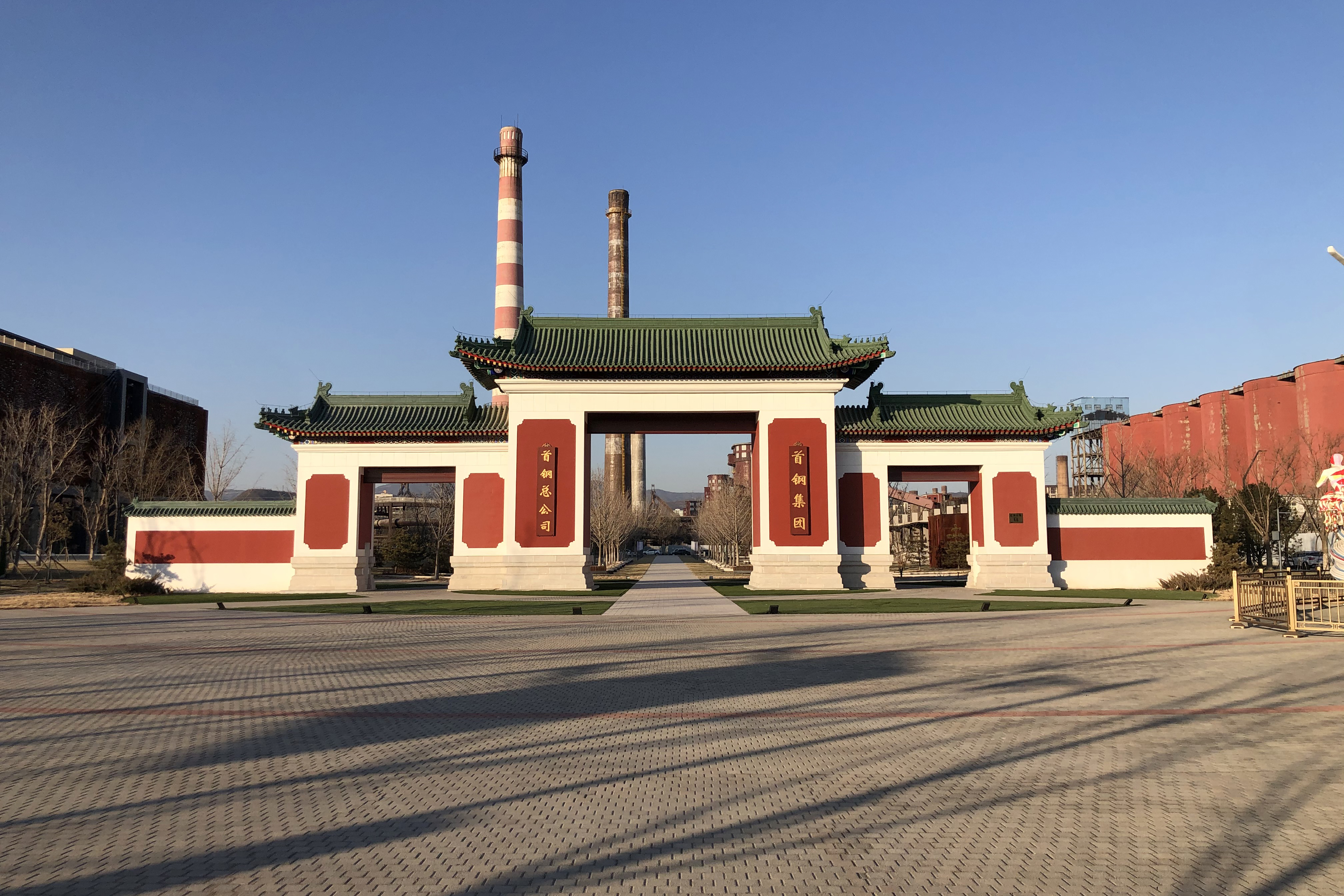
- Replica of the east gate of Shougang Shijingshan Factory
- Formerly: Shougang Corporation
- Type: State-owned enterprise
- Industry: Steel manufacturing, mining, investment
- Founded: 1919
- Founder: Longyan Iron Mine Limited
- Headquarters: Beijing, China
- Area served: China and international
- Key people: Zhu Jimin (Chairman and Party Committee Secretary)
- Products: Steel, iron ore, coking coal, building materials
- Revenue: US$13.4 billion (2024)
- Owner: People's Government of Beijing (79.40%)
- Number of employees: 90,000 (2024)
- Parent: State-owned Assets Supervision and Administration Commission of the Government of Beijing
- Website: www.shougang.com.cn

Shougang Group Co., Ltd. (Chinese: 首钢集团有限公司), formerly known as Shougang Corporation, is a major state-owned enterprise based in Beijing, China. Founded in 1919, it is one of China's oldest and most prominent steel producers. Over the years, Shougang has diversified into mining, real estate, environmental services, and technology-related industries.

== History ==
Shougang originated as the Shijingshan Steel Plant in Beijing's Shijingshan District in 1919. It was renamed "Shougang" (short for "Capital Steel") in 1967. For decades, it was one of the largest steel producers in northern China.

Due to growing environmental concerns in the capital, Shougang began relocating its steelmaking operations to Caofeidian District in Tangshan, Hebei Province, starting in 2005. The relocation was completed by 2010, freeing up the original industrial site for redevelopment.

== Operations ==
=== Steelmaking ===
Shougang's core steelmaking activities are now centered in Caofeidian, with major subsidiaries including:

- Beijing Shougang Co., Ltd. (SZSE: 000959)
- Shougang Tonghua Iron & Steel (Jilin)

Shougang produces a wide range of steel products for construction, automotive, infrastructure, and manufacturing industries.

=== Mining ===
==== Shougang Mining Company ====
Based in Qianxi County, Hebei, Shougang Mining Company oversees five major iron ore mines: Dashihe, Shuichang, Xingshan, Tangshouma, and Macheng. It is also involved in sand and gravel aggregate production and is pursuing automation and green mining technologies.

==== Shougang Fushan Resources Group ====
Listed in Hong Kong, Shougang Fushan Resources operates three coking coal mines in Shanxi Province (Xingwu, Jinjiazhuang, Zhaiyadi) with a combined coal preparation capacity of 6.3 million tonnes per year.

==== Shougang Hierro Perú ====
Shougang acquired Peru's Marcona Iron Mine in 1992 through its subsidiary Shougang Hierro Perú. Located in the Marcona District on the Pacific coast, the open-pit mine is one of Latin America's major iron ore operations. It has faced criticism over labor practices and environmental impact.

=== Infrastructure Asset Management ===
Shougang Group maintains a strategic presence in Hong Kong through its red chip subsidiary, Shoucheng Holdings Limited (SEHK: 697). Originally engaged in steel and trading, the company restructured in the late 2010s and now focuses on infrastructure asset management, intelligent parking, and green energy investment across China. It serves as Shougang's offshore investment and capital platform.

== Shougang Park and Redevelopment ==
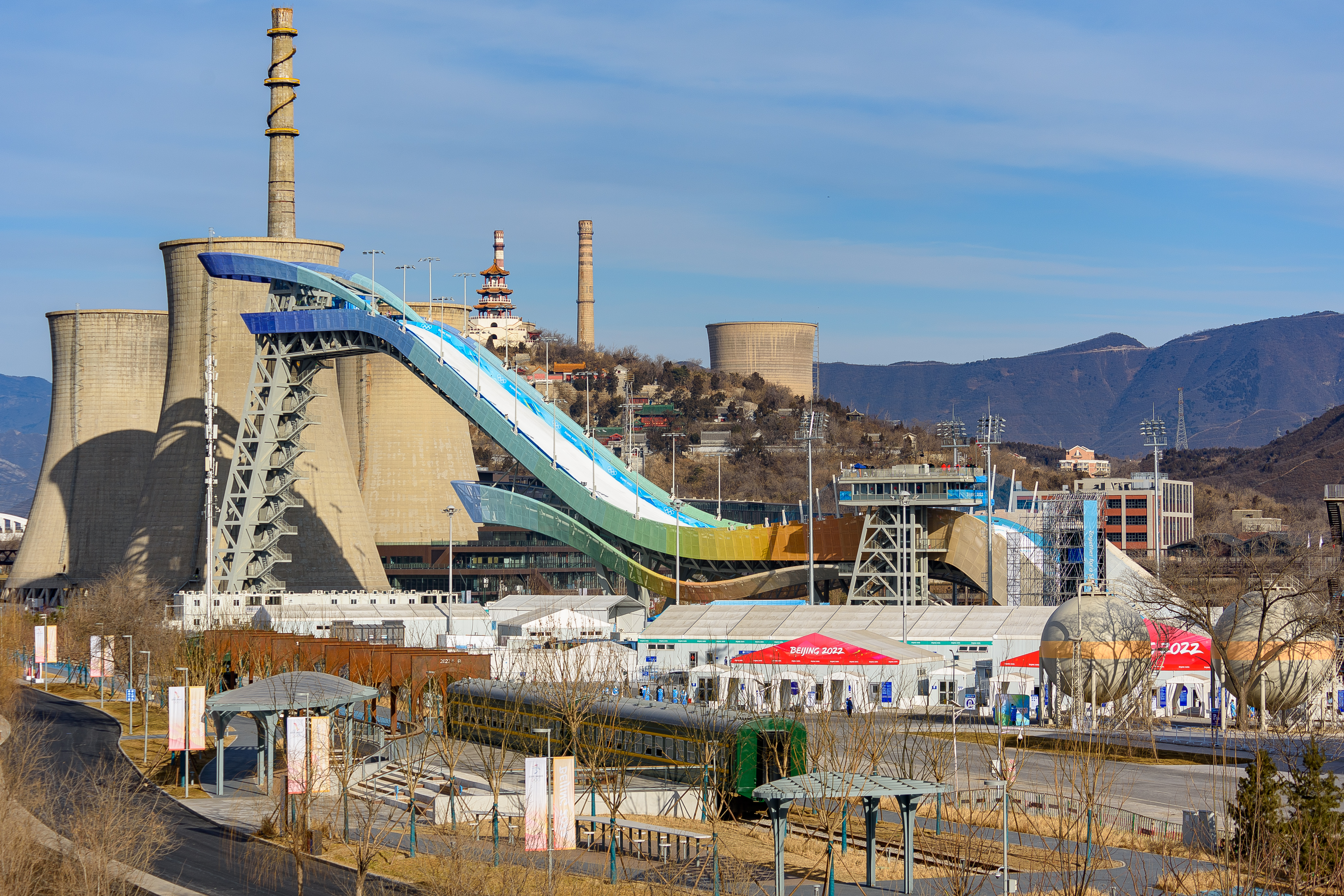
Big Air Shougang in Shougang Park

Following the closure of its Beijing mill, Shougang transformed the old industrial site into Shougang Park. The park integrates culture, tourism, sports, and business, and was developed using green and "sponge city" design principles.

One highlight is the Big Air Shougang ski jump, constructed for the 2022 Winter Olympics. The surrounding area includes offices, convention spaces, and museums.

== SoReal Metaverse Theme Park ==
In partnership with Sky Limit Entertainment, Shougang redeveloped the No. 1 Blast Furnace into the SoReal Metaverse Paradise, a VR and immersive technology park featuring exhibitions, e-sports, holography, and 5G applications. The theme park is part of Shougang's long-term asset management, but operations are now largely run by commercial partners.
