= Integral Education =

Educational views of Brazilian Integralism

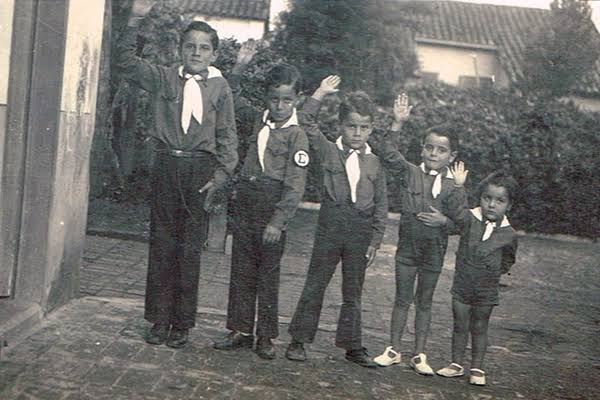
A group of children at Minas Gerais (1940), dressed in Brazilian Integralist uniform and saluting.

Integral Education (Portuguese: Educação Integral) is a concept within Brazilian Integralism, referring to an educational model that would address students from an Integralist point of view, aimed at educating holistically both physical, intellectual, civic and spiritual aspects of human beings. Integral Education was deeply influenced by conservative politics and philosophical idealism, and was seen as a key aspect of the Integralist revolution against materialism. Nonetheless, Integralists never sought to develop their own pedagogical school and considered Integral Education as a mere consequence of the movement's ideas.

Integral Education would be based on conservative and functionalist ideals and was to teach sacrifice, discipline and obedience from a moralist and idealist point of view. Despite considering spiritual and patriotic education a priority, Integralists were interested in elevating the cultural level of the population in order to make them fit citizens for the new Integral state. The educative program, based on Traditional Catholicism, would attempt to transform the individuals in order to make them morally ascetic and willing to sacrifice everything for the nation.

The concept is derived from Plínio Salgado's idea of the "Integral man". According to Salgado, modern society forced the division and contradicition of people's different aspects, such as the spiritual and political, by promoting an individualistic and de-spiritualized way of living and denying the spiritual dimension of humans. The revolution that was to be led by the Integralist movement would bring into existence a New Man characterized by a deep spirituality, both religious and patriotic. Integralists emphasised the need of an "inner revolution" carried out by each individual that would create a vanguard to lead the nation to its palingenesis.

As most Brazilian intellectual movements of the early 20th-century, Integralists were deeply concerned with the high illiteracy rates in the country and considered the lack of education as a major obstacle for development. An Integral approach to education would, theoretically, carry out a "civilizing and educational process" that would turn the "ignorant and anarchic mobs into a productive and ordered people". Education would also be key for the nation-building process Integralists wanted to achieve as a part of their "spiritual revolution" against liberalism.

Integralists sought to promote their ideas to the foundation of private and free Integral schools across the country, taking advantage of the null involvement of the government in educative matters. At the moment of its dissolution, the movement had founded nearly 3,500 centers of alphabetization and a large number of schools.
