= Liang Jun =

Liang Jun may refer to:

- Liang Jun (fencer) (born 1969), Chinese fencer
- Liang Jun (tractor driver) (1930–2020), Chinese folk hero and model worker
- Liang Jun (activist) (born 1945), Chinese activist and teacher
- Liang Xinjun (born 1968), Chinese entrepreneur
