= Iron Girls =

Mao-era Chinese term for women in laborious jobs

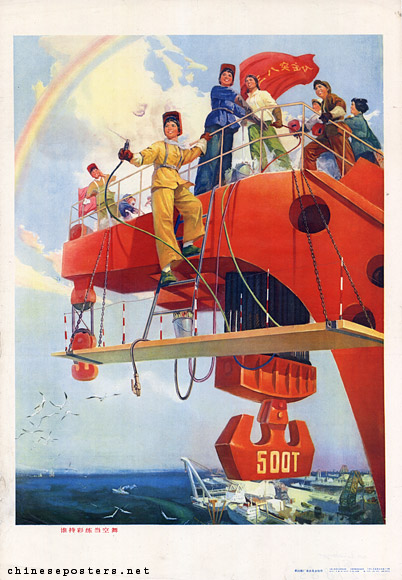
A propaganda poster with Iron Girls

Iron Girls (sometimes translated as Iron Women) is a term that was popularized in the People's Republic of China during the 1950s through the 1970s. It was used to define a new idealized emerging group of working women who were strong and capable of performing highly demanding labor tasks, usually assigned to men. These tasks included repairing high-voltage electric wires, working at farmland, or heavy physical work. Beginning during the Great Leap Forward, Iron Girls were a symbol of shifting gender norms during the Cultural Revolution of the 1960s and 1970s, and in the years following the cultural revolution they faced harsh criticism. Iron Girls relied on the idea that men and women were inherently equal, but this idea was criticized by some feminists for its emphasis on the division of labor.

Accounts of Iron Girls are limited, aside from state propaganda which was circulated during the Cultural Revolution. Propaganda images emphasized women with strong physical attributes as well as their ability to perform in jobs which had been dominated by men in the years prior to the Cultural Revolution. Firsthand narratives in the form of memoirs which focus on other social issues at the time are some of the only pieces of evidence of the era available to historians, making it difficult to understand the reality of life as an Iron Girl.

The relative equal opportunities for women in labor was a deviation from traditional Chinese models, where there was a large gendered division of labor. After the death of Mao Zedong, the idea and depictions of Iron Girls would be heavily mocked and the Chinese government would encourage women to take up traditionally female roles.

== Origin ==
=== Iron Men ===
Iron men initially referred to male oil workers in Daqing. Wang Jinxi was the first "Iron Man," or model worker, at the Daqing oil field. Wang Jinxi and his drilling team took the train to Saertu on March 25, 1960. However, his drilling machine had not arrived yet. On April 4, he and his crew finally found their drilling machine in a train car on the Binzhou line, but there were no machines available to move the sixty tons of equipment. Wang and his team moved all the equipment several kilometers to their work site over four days and had it installed by April 11. The host of the family assigned to house Wang found him sleeping next to the power generation when he did not turn in for the night and said of him, "Your team leader is an iron man!" At the First Daqing Oil Field Technology Colloquium at the Anda Railway Workers' Club, General Yu called Wang to center stage and pronounced, "Learn from the Iron Man! Salute the Iron Man!" News of the Iron Man spread throughout the Daqing oil field so that workers would visit Wang's site. Following Kang Shi'en's Ten-Thousand-Person-Swearing-In-Conference on April 20, new iron man worker models arose, including the "Red Flag" work units.

=== Creation of the Iron Girl ===
The term "Iron Girl" originated from the Dazhai Young Women Pioneer's Team for agricultural production.

Dazhai is a village located in Shanxi province. Dazhai women have participated in arduous farm-work since the 1930s. Most of Dazhai's able-bodied men left the village for the Second Sino-Japanese War (1937–1945), leaving the women to take a more prominent role in agricultural work. These women continued working the fields after the war. In the 1950s, Mao Zedong's government required county officials to work in the fields for a month each year. In 1959, Zhao Mancang and his team of officials worked the fields in Dazhai but after 10 days of working with the men, they decided to switch and work with the women. Zhao said, "Originally we thought working with women in the fields would be less strenuous, but actually women's labor was more intense. . . Dazhai women had a particular habit while working in the fields. They did not chat and often continued working without any break. So following women in the fields for one week was even worse than before. Some on our team had such severe bodily pains that they could not sleep at night. Our county judge did not even have the strength to hold his bowl after a day's work in the fields. He dropped his bowl in the canteen." Dazhai women worked hard to produce grain in the poor mountainous region.

In 1963, a flood destroyed the terraced farmland surrounding the main village and collapsed many of the cave houses. Twenty-three girls, ages thirteen to sixteen, formed a youth task force to help restore the village. Chen Yonggui (1915–1986), the illiterate village leader, told the girls to leave early one day but they refused, saying, "Since the men do not go home, we will not go home, either. Why should we go back first?” He responded by saying, “You girls are made of iron!” Following this interaction, the girls renamed their youth task force the Iron Girls Brigade. This was the first use of the term "Iron Girls." Stories about these women began to circulate: "one cut her finger to the bone but kept on working, another became a crack shot in the militia."

The Shanxi provincial head told Mao Zedong about Dazhai in 1964 due to the large harvest they accomplished the year before despite the flood. Mao made Dazhai a national model for agriculture. Mao organized the "Learn from Dazhai in agriculture" campaign. Stories of the Iron Girls Brigade were spread through national publicity.

==== Guo Fenglian ====
Guo Fenglian was the first nationally recognized Iron Girl. She worked the fields in the 1950s, saying that girls worked hard "to produce more grain so that we would be able to fill up our stomachs; and that would also be our contribution to socialism.” In 1963, at the formation of the girl's youth task force, Guo Fenglian was elected the brigade leader at age seventeen. With the promotion of Dazhai in 1964, she became a national celebrity. She received so many admiration letters that her team members had to help her respond. She met both Chairman Mao and Premier Zhou Enlai and became friends with Mao's wife Jiang Qing. In 1973, Guo was promoted to the head of Dazhai and joined county, provincial, and national leading bodies. In 1980, following the end of the cultural revolution, state rhetoric against masculine women rose as they tried to push a return to femininity. Due to this, Guo lost all leadership positions she had previously held.

== History ==
=== Qing Empire ===
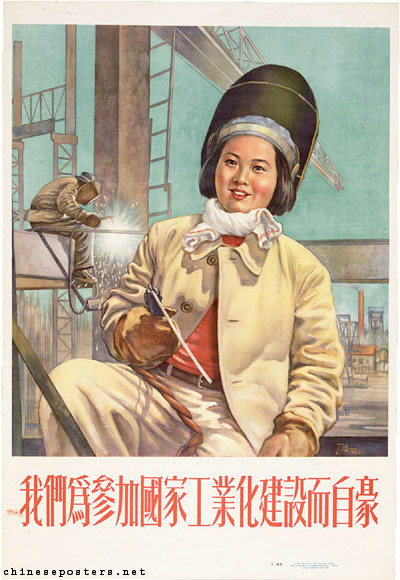
Propaganda poster reading "We are proud to take part in the nation's industrial development"

Under the Qing Empire, and to a degree the Republic of China, labor was heavily gendered which was exacerbated through practices such as footbinding and the civil service exam. Upper-class women were expected to spend the majority of their time inside the home where they were tasked with managing the household. Girls of these households would generally be educated in fields such as weaving and art which were seen as advantageous traits to have when it came time for arranging marriage. Boys were expected to spend the majority of their time studying for the civil service exam and were educated by tutors and even their educated mothers. Men who passed the civil service exam were often away from home as official government work required for men to travel to outside provinces.

For lower-class families the gender stratification was not as wide. Most lower-class men and boys could not afford the lessons needed to pass the civil service exam and women did not have their feet bound as tightly as privileged women. In many farming families women would often work alongside their male family members despite having bound feet.

=== Maoist China ===
Mao Zedong saw labor as the tool of women's liberation. In his writings Mao Zedong saw rural peasant women as less oppressed by men than other women due to their ability to work and attributes many of rural women movements to their ability to work and therefore have a say in family and political issues.

Under Mao Zedong's government, many of the social structures and laws surrounding women and marriage were discarded and replaced with a system that emphasized the similarities between men and women. The 1950 Marriage Law would outlaw many of the previous systems of marriage such as arranged marriage and concubinage. In addition to this, it made obtaining a divorce easier for both genders and equalized the distribution of property after divorce.

During the 1950s, urban Chinese women started to join male-dominated fields. A way to promote women's new roles under collectivization was the formation of labor models. Labor models were idealized women who excelled in production and were used by the state to encouraged other women to follow their example and mobilize. Women's participation in male fields was praised. The Great Leap Forward's focus on total workforce mobilization resulted in opportunities for women's labor advancement. Women did traditionally male work in both fields and factories, including major movements of women into management positions.

This tendency continued during the Cultural Revolution as even more rural women were incorporated into men's agricultural work. The Iron Girls propaganda helped advance these efforts as they were national labor models. According to the Chinese Communist Party's central committee, the increasing participation of women in heavy industry was a result of answering the state's call. The term “Iron Girls” became popularized around the 1960s, which was a metaphor to represent the young working women in the rural countryside. The first Iron Girl brigade was formed in 1963 in Dazhai in order to address the agricultural losses caused by a flood. They appeared as a model production squad, and were able to shoulder heavy labor with their “iron shoulders, hence the name. Initially, the brigade did not have the goal to contend with men or challenge traditional gender norms. However, when Mao Zedong used the Dazhai brigade as an example of mobilization techniques, they started to facilitate different agendas. In the wake of Dazhai's Iron Girls brigade propaganda, many new specialized groups started to form in an array of different male-dominated fields (like coal mining, transportation, fishing etc.)

Localized labor shortages and feminization of agriculture also contributed to the rise of the Iron Girls. Men were migrating towards non-agricultural sectors, like joining the army or working in cities. Men had more opportunities, so when they left, women had to replace their work. During the 1960s, agriculture was feminized in many areas, as women were responsible for 87.5% of agricultural work at the time. In urban areas, women's brigades were also on the rise, because of the government's new employment policies: with the sudden employment of a large number of educated females, the government had to assign some of them to physically demanding tasks, rather than just the bureaus. Therefore, they did not have another choice. Yet even in the frontlines, women outnumbered men, and each brigade was only assigned a few men to boost morale. Then when there weren't enough men, all-women groups were formed and they were assigned tasks that other people did not want to do. However, the single-sex groups started demonstrating high levels of productivity, because they were able to draw from a gender-based identity which was rooted in increasing their confidence and strength. Furthermore, women's brigades became a source of pride for the workers, because their work was attracting attention and respect from the public, which further incentivized them to work enthusiastically. In addition to their commitment to their work, the women were also applauded for being loyal and following instructions carefully. Therefore, many local administrations were inclined to utilize their services, since they were faithful to commanders, and were increasingly productive after even after minimal incentives.

The ability of women to perform the same tasks as men was emphasized during the Maoist era and the Iron Girls who took up traditional masculine roles, such as electricians or tractor drivers, were celebrated by Chinese media. However, the vast majority of Chinese women still did not work in these traditionally masculine fields and continued to work in areas such as textiles, which were historically dominated by women. Although the rhetoric of the Iron Girl helped women achieve praise and prominence in fields they were typically excluded from, its main goal was not to address women's issues or liberation. Feminism was considered bourgeois by the Chinese government and the industrialization and development of the state were the primary motivating factors for the state to push for further inclusion of women in more “masculine” fields.

=== Sent-down youth ===
Praise of masculinization was not limited to rural areas. Urban women were taking up what were traditionally men's jobs. Female Red Guards followed the same beliefs as the Iron Girls: that women could do whatever men could do. They too could become masculine and equal to their male counterparts through their revolutionary efforts. However, Red Guards devolved into violence. Sent-down youth was the government response to the violence incited by the Red Guards in the cities. In 1968, the People's Liberation Army went into the cities to end the conflicts that had spread to the factories. The central government enacted a campaign to "send down" the youth as a long-term solution to ending urban violence and unemployment. These young people were “to learn from the poor and lower-middle peasants” by working in the countryside.

Sent-down youth were surprised by the gender inequality in the countryside. They believed women could do whatever men could, including men's jobs. In the countryside, though, women still faced subjugation. In Inner Mongolia, there was a division of labor between men's outer work and women's inner domestic work. For the sent-down youth to participate in traditionally male-centric hard labor, they had to adopt a male identity. A male identity meant the ability to compete in arduous and physically demanding labor. They "did the heavy jobs at the bottom of the well... We refused to display any weakness: we forged iron, constructed buildings, and carried 200-jin gunnysacks. We became true laborers." Their fellow villagers regarded them as extremely masculine due to the tasks they took on. Hence, sent-down youth were allowed to participate in the fields because they were not regarded as wholly female, whereas peasant women from the countryside remained in their domestic sphere.

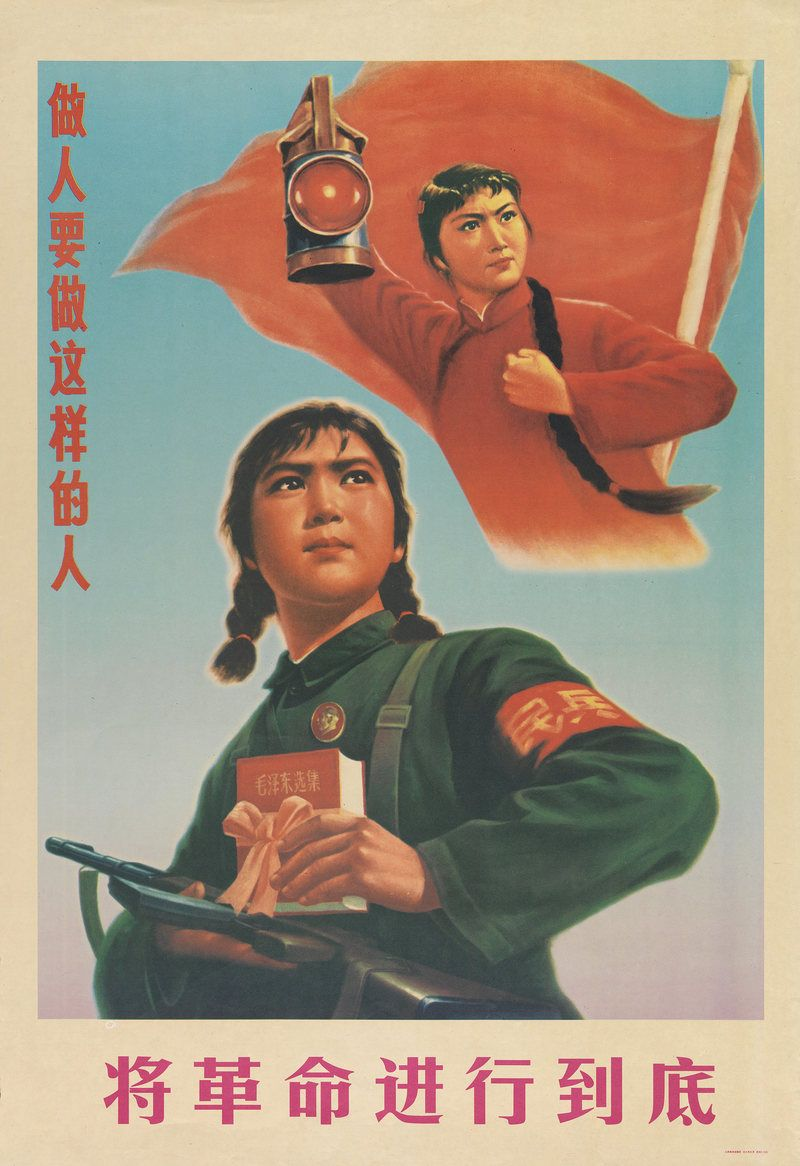
A propaganda poster

The sent-down youth regarded themselves as crusaders for change and equality in the workplace. Many of them regarded themselves as Iron Girls. Even those that didn't emulated "Iron Girlism," the idea women could be equal to men through participation in extremely masculine hard labor. They believed their example would inspire other rural women. These adolescent urban-educated sent down girls supported Mao's slogan of equality and idolized the agenda of the Iron Girls. Therefore, their missionary-like attitudes helped further the state propaganda. However, not all sent-down girls were leaders of gender equality within the workforce. Many found this new lifestyle difficult to maintain, and chose to get married in order to escape the hardships of working in the fields.

Account of Xiao Sun, a newly sent-down teen, exemplifies the youth's commitment to Mao's propagandas. As Xiao was sent to the countryside from Chengdu, she was first assigned to be a health worker in a factory but, she wanted a more demanding job. Therefore, she asked to be placed in the mines, but was informed that there was a regulation prohibiting women from working in the mines. Then she replied “but the times have changed. Men and women are the same! Why can't women comrades do the same things men comrades can do?”, which granted her the opportunity to work alongside men.

In her memoire, Spider Eaters, the Chinese-American writer Rae Yang describes her experiences in the Great Northern Wilderness as a sent-down female. The memoire includes vivid descriptions of the rising class of Iron Girls as masculine, loud, and strong. Nevertheless, Yang describes her experience as an empowering one, since men and women truly did enjoy full equality under the new system of the Cultural Revolution: women were able to do all the jobs men did, and even better at times. However, there was still an inherent inequality in the system. Women were assumed to take over a male identity to perform tasks that are usually assigned to men. And the “female designated” tasks like domestic labor were not regarded as highly. When women worked the same amount as men, they still would not be paid equally. Sent-down girls could only earn seven work points a day, while boys could earn nine. However, it is difficult to compare the actual labor divisions of men and women due to a lack of data from the period. The Maoist years were very strict about the distribution of data, and even if it was accessible, many production units were inflating their data to fulfill government quotas, so they were not as accurate. Therefore, we must rely on personal narratives and testimonials of these workers. The accounts told by the sent-down youth mostly focus on individual experiences and their perceptions of the responsibilities of rural women.

== Art and media ==
=== Propaganda ===
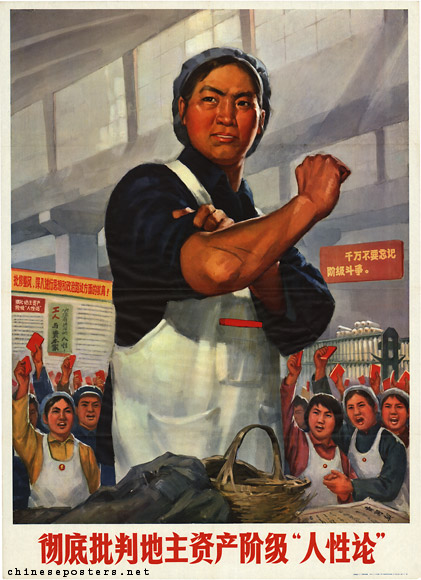
Poster reading "A thorough criticism of the landlord and bourgeois theory of human nature"

Media in the 1950s and 1960s promoted women's mobilization into the agricultural sector. The ACWF's magazine Women of China worked to "acknowledge rural women's contribution to socialist construction and to promote women's entrance into traditionally male spaces and occupations." The 1962 film Li Shunagshuang promoted women joining the state's collectivization effort. However, it was criticized during the Cultural Revolution for its attention to "petty bourgeois" personal matters, these personal matters referring to those between husband and wife.

During the Cultural Revolution, depictions of iron girls became a frequent subject of art, often shown in spaces and activities traditionally associated with male authority as part of an effort to develop the new socialist woman. Media emphasized women's roles as paid laborers and the increasing number of women in the workforce. Some media also highlighted achievements of women in previously female-dominated industries. The way in which Iron Girls were presented in media was primarily to highlight women's participation in the workforce, rather than to suggest radical shifts in gender dynamics. The main focus of Iron Girls in the media was to inspire more women to join the workforce, and to show women that they could become like men. The focus of the propaganda was not to change society's perspective on gender as a whole.

Media often overlooked the important roles women traditionally played in society as wives and mothers, and the important work they performed in the home to keep households running. Media accounts of single women dominated propaganda, which disregarded the work of women in the domestic sphere. Often, propaganda celebrated women who left traditional domestic roles in favor of work in factories, in the countryside, or in other spaces previously dominated by men. Young women received praise for going against cultural norms and leaving the domestic sphere. Tasks such as raising children and caring after family members were presented as obstacles in the state media. There was very little attention paid to the importance of women looking after children and families and continuously performing tasks in the home.

After the Cultural Revolution in the 1970s, the idea of Iron Girls became the subject of satire due to criticism that the idea of women performing the same work as men went against natural expectations of women. In the Post-Mao era, gender became much more defined as the view of women in the workforce shifted.

State propaganda and artwork showed a preference for women who were larger, muscular, or had features similar to that of men. Images presented women performing physically demanding jobs which had previously been dominated by men. The images showcased muscular women lifting heavy objects and groups of women joyously performing tasks. In images where women weren't smiling, they were often featured with stern expressions to emphasize the seriousness of their tasks. The images also reinforced the Iron Girls idea that women and men could perform the same activities, and they focused primarily on women looking and acting more like men and women having the same physical attributes as men. State propaganda was used to show that women could and should act like men in their work.

=== Literature ===
First hand accounts of the Iron Girls are extremely limited because most first hand evidence are memoirs that do not focus on labor. These memoirs mostly focus on other struggles faced by women during the 20th century. These sources are set in a narrative framework rather than analytical. Any accounts that do focus on the intersection of gender and labor are primarily personal testimonies and secondhand sources. Many sources were written by intellectuals which focused primarily on social issues and not labor, but there are some accounts of sent-down youth. Additionally, the primary source of evidence on Iron Girls is state media and propaganda. Accounts present in the media were overwhelmingly positive when pertaining to the life experiences of urban and rural women. These positive accounts focus on the experience of the urban and rural youth, and how their opportunities to become members of the workforce impacted their lives for good.

The collection of data concerning how active women were in the workforce is another aspect that is difficult to get and accurate view of because of instances in which some production units would inflate their labor statistics in order to reach quotas. This means that the numbers of women historians do have a record of could be inaccurate. Also obstructing researchers' ability to gain accurate information is the fact that surveying women for research purposes was not allowed during the Cultural Revolution. These factors contribute to a limited knowledge of the experience of the Iron Girls and their personal lives. Information missing concerning the Iron Girls is what kind of work men were assigned compared to women, the gendered aspects of the workplace, and how other rural citizens felt about this change in gendered labor. In addition, researchers have tried to understand how the Iron Girls themselves felt about their positions in the workforce and in their society as a whole. This lack of data makes it difficult for researchers and historians to understand what life was like as an Iron Girl, and how other members of the communities felt about Iron Girls.

After the death of Mao, there was a shift in tone in literature from the positive narratives found during the Cultural Revolution. Scar literature of the 1970s and 1980s offered a much more negative glimpse in reflecting on the events of the Cultural Revolution. It reflected on the time period while highlighting the struggle of Chinese citizens and the suffering they endured. Additionally, it was used as a source to reflect on the Cultural Revolution in attempts to heal the impacts of it. In the 1990s there was another shift in tone, and literature became nostalgic for the Cultural Revolution. More specifically, women had nostalgia for the different opportunities they were presented with at this time to cross gender barriers in the workforce. Many women reflected on their ability to see the country in their work, develop themselves as independent women, and experience life in a different way than women who came before and after them.

== Criticisms ==
=== Post-Mao era ===
The death of Mao Zedong ushered in China's Reform Era where many Maoist economic and social reforms were altered or repealed. The role of women in Chinese society would again change, this time towards a more biological determinist view and the belief that women had an essential femininity and were fit for certain tasks and unfit for others. The image of the Iron Girl would be abandoned and the state would advocate for women to take up roles that were once again gendered. For example, many factory worker positions were filled by women while managerial positions were taken by men, as women were seen as easier to control and could learn assembly line work quicker than men. Some of the rural women who took up these jobs in the cities would find more economic freedoms and even social mobility but also had to adapt to a society that placed increasing importance on gender.

In the 1980s, iron girls “became the symbol of masculinization of women in the socialist period.” During the Mao period, women were told to become like men, however, this was seen as a gross gender altering in the 1980s. “The idea that women could or should behave like men was explicitly rejected as just another ill-conceived Cultural Revolution attempt to challenge human nature.” Women's femininity and domesticity were valued instead in the post-Mao era.

Iron girls and concepts of female masculinity were mocked by the media and scholars. In 1979, on a popular crosstalk, xiangsheng, two men, Mr. A and Mr. B. criticized a local Iron Girl for her unappealing masculinity. Mr. B asked Mr. As if he would have “such a capable maiden for his wife.” Mr. A responded that “he would be afraid that such a woman might flatten him with a random swing of her overdeveloped biceps, not to mention what might happen if she actually got angry.” Iron girls became a tool for comedy. They were regarded to have cartoon-like strength and look overly butch. In 1986, a group of male scholars in Beijing claimed, “A woman who becomes masculine is a mutant. Capable women should be different from men. They have their own special charm, for example exquisiteness and depth of emotions, and well-developed imagistic thinking. Women's own latent abilities should be called forth. The appearance of "fake boys" and "iron women" is a disguised form of discrimination against women; it belittles them. Its basic point still is that men are better than women, and that therefore when women are strong they should resemble men.”

The gender sameness of the revolutionary period was dissolved in the 1980s. Arguments against female masculinity post-Mao can also be tied to the rise of the myth of yinsheng yangshuai. Yinsheng yangshuai was the “women-are-too-strong-and-men-are-too-weak phenomenon.” Literary scholar Xueping Zhong believed this occurrence identified a “male ‘marginality complex.’” There was anxiety about male feminization post-Mao era as a reaction to female masculinization in the Mao era. In the post-Mao era, a man should be masculine and a female should be feminine.

=== Feminist critiques ===
During the 1980s, Iron Girls became subject to heavy criticism and mockery due to its focus on a gendered division of labor. Women's labor was more closely tied with their biological abilities and inabilities, while no such constraint was discussed for men. The controversy with the Iron Girls movement was the absence of gender issues among its agenda. Women and Men were expected to be the same, rather than different in their own ways. This was an issue that was also observed within the Chinese Communist Party, which regarded feminism as a “bourgeois” concept.

The message of the Iron Girls was very limited in regards to true feminism and equality, because they simply pushed women to become more like men. The government regarded masculine qualities as preferable to that of the domestic women, and depicted the standard of success as the imitation of men's talents. It was never argued that men could also strive to become more like women. This restricted women's development, because as long as the agenda of Iron Girls continued, the Communist Party believed the issue of gender inequality was alleviated. However, Iron Girls were only a small amount of the population, so majority of the population did not see any gender-related changes a push for equality during this decade.

=== Labor inequality ===
Another criticism of this movement was its disregard of women's contribution to the domestic workforce. Even though women were encouraged to join previously male-dominated professions, they were still expected to be responsible for the domestic sphere. Yet these efforts were not applauded as an important contribution to society, and was mostly ignored. The issues of women's labor during the Cultural Revolution was condensed into the new rise of Iron Girls. However, the Iron Girls were not representative of the entire Chinese society, as they were only a small portion of it. The model was heavily shaped and manipulated by local officials and urban women, and did not depict the entirety of cultural norms about labor.

The Iron Girls movement also exceeded the physical capacity of many women. In turn, they suffered physical and gynecological diseases.
