= Integral state =

Political concept in Brazilian Integralism

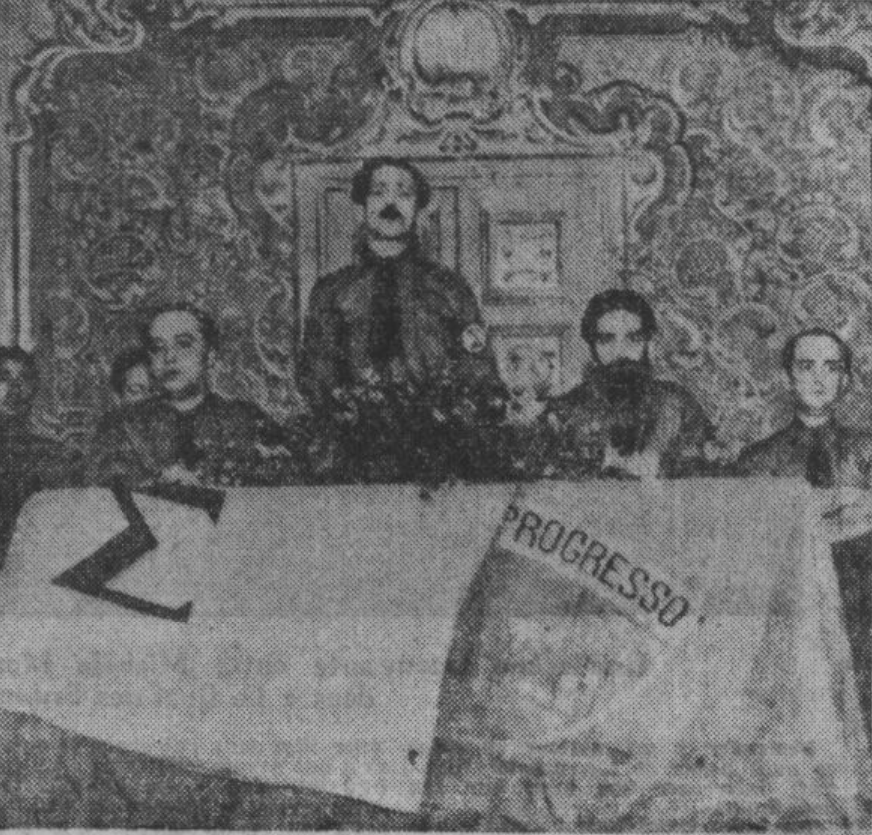
Plínio Salgado giving a speech at Rio de Janeiro, 1938

The Integral state theory (Portuguese: Teoria do Estado integral) is a political concept developed by Plínio Salgado as an Integralist conception of the state, deriving explicitly from his idea of the Integral man (Portuguese: Homem integral).

Salgado understood modern state theory as inherently flawed, pointing out that its materialist basis saw human beings either from an economicist or political perspective and denied entirely their spiritual dimensions. These postures would lead, theoretically, to the liberal or totalitarian state that had caused the de-spiritualization of the West in the pursuit of materialist needs. The Integral state, contrastingly, would rejoin all aspects of the new Integral man through corporatist and organicist mechanisms that would allow political, economic and spiritual issues to be addressed simultaneously.

The Integral corporate state would comprise not only economic and productive corporations, but would also include social and cultural organisms such as the Catholic Church, the Army, the magistrates, the artists, the scientists and other social groups who would be granted political representation and power as a way of abolishing political parties and liberal democracy in favour of a model where the only means for political action would be corporate representation.

Brazilian Integralists saw the state as a "spiritual organism" that, rejecting both the ineffective liberal state and the "fetishist" totalitarian state, would be an instrument for the "spiritual revolution" the movement would lead by restoring traditional values and Catholic spirituality. Through active state intervention in society, Integralists aimed at creating a new Catholic social order backed on a strong national identity and a spiritualist conception of life. The state was to become a point of reference for social ethics by giving value to social hierarchy, order and morality.

Logo of the AIB, displaying the Brazilian map and the Greek Sigma.

The Integral state theory was seen by its supporters as a way to build up communitarianism and organize all Brazilians in a "great family" that would unite all races under the same national identity. Integralists saw Brazil as lacking the national cohesion needed to create a nation state due to the influence of an individualistic liberal state, and advocated for a system that, basing itself on traditional values and religion as a foundation for the new nation, would give Brazil an effective framework to develop an actual national sentimient. Brazilian Integralism used the Sigma as an emblem to symbolize, among other things, the "summatory" of all ethnic groups under a single nationalist cause.
