= Model worker =

Communist Chinese political term

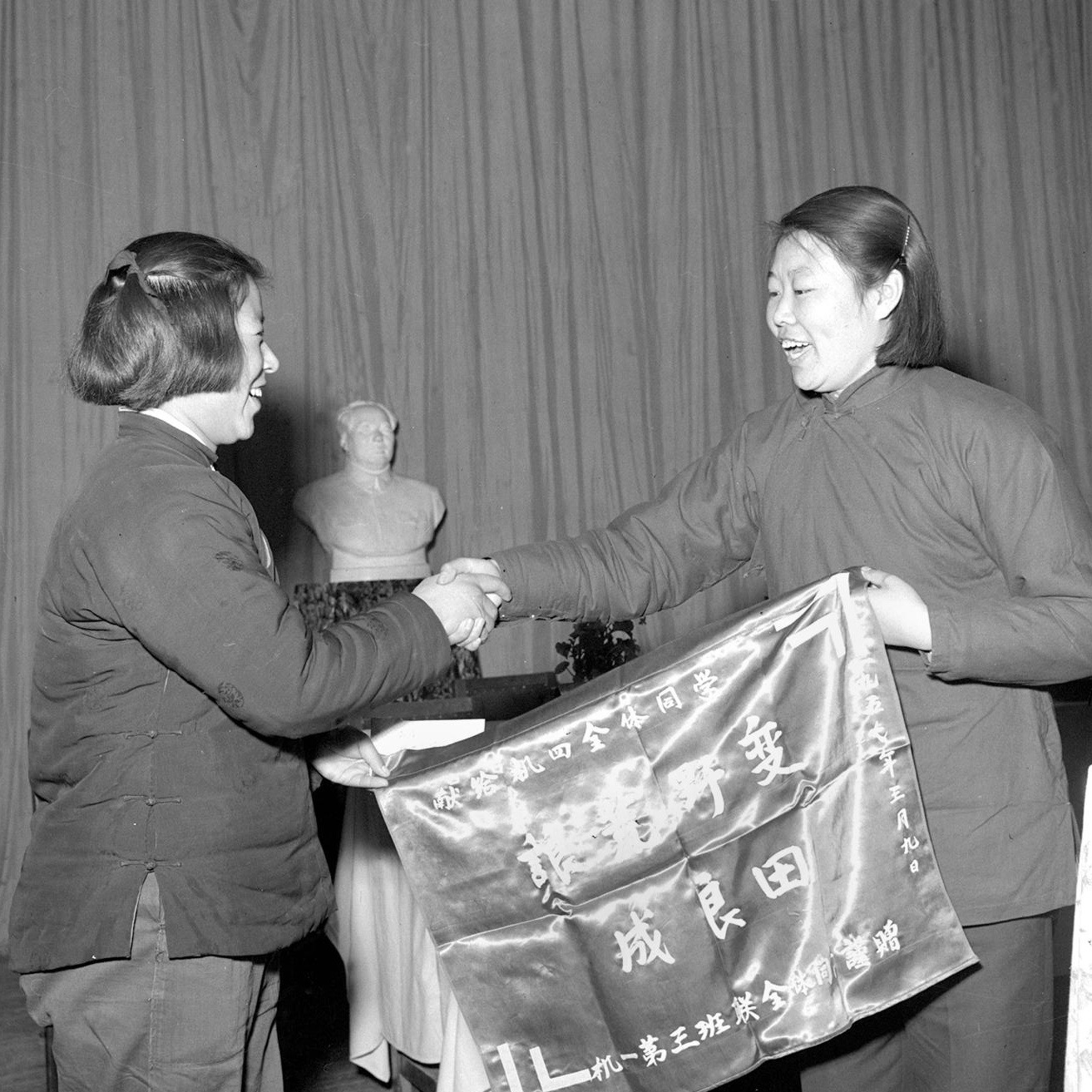
Liang Jun, the first female tractor driver in China, graduated from Beijing Academy of Agricultural Mechanization in 1957.

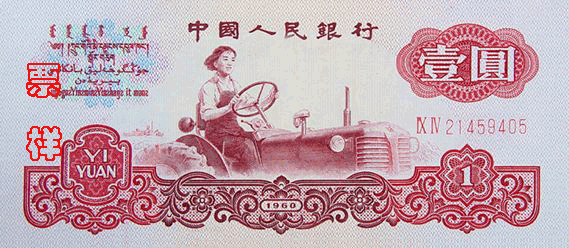
The third set of Renminbi 1 Yuan is model worker and female tractor driver Liang Jun

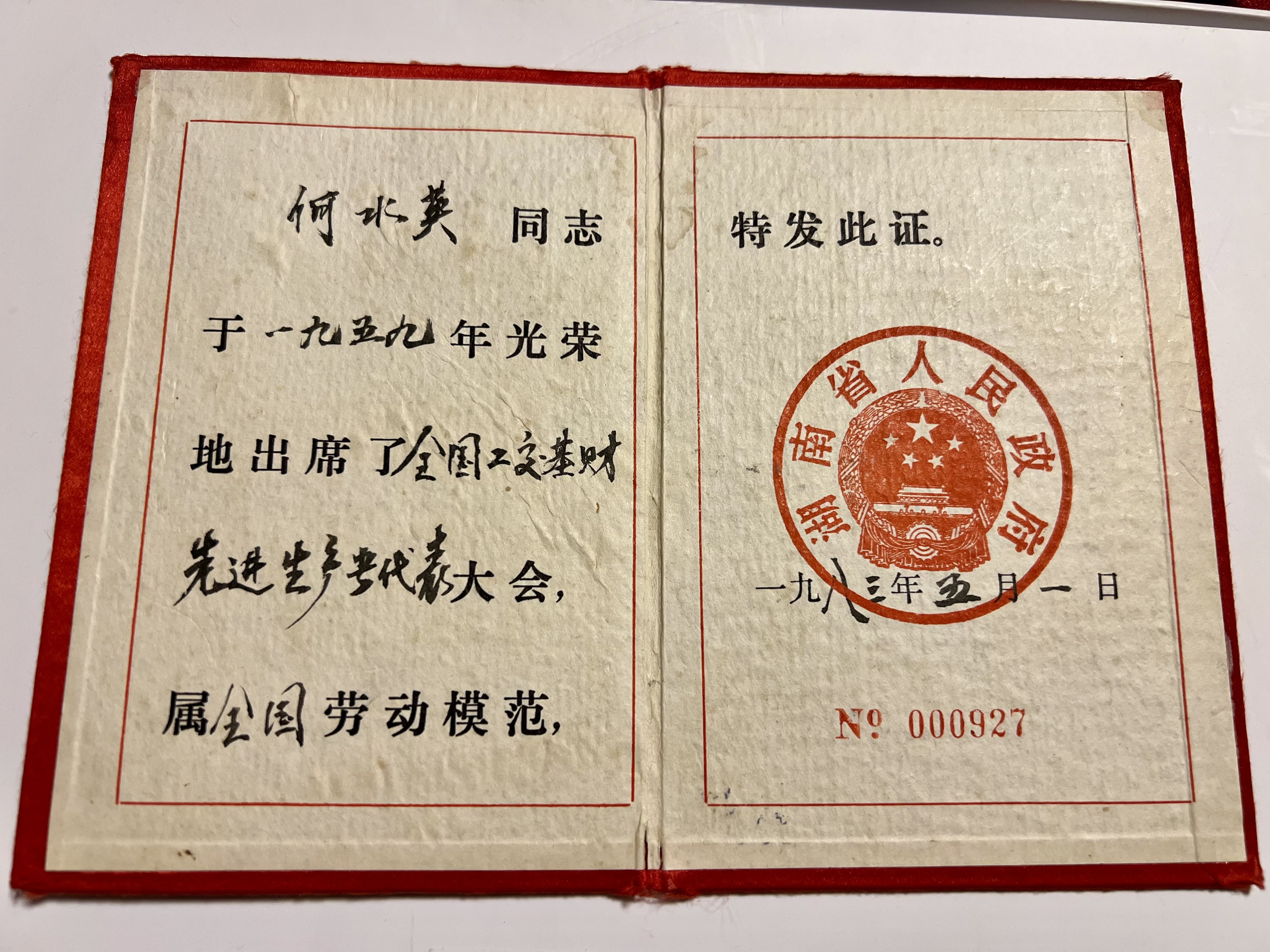
an identification of a 1959 model worker issued in 1983

Model worker (Chinese: 劳动模范; pinyin: láodòng mófàn, abbreviated as 劳模 or láomó) is a term in the People's Republic of China that refers to a worker who exhibits some or all of the traits appropriate to the ideal of the socialism. Exemplary workers come from various sectors of the Chinese economy and can be both men and women. Since the founding of the People's Republic in 1949, thousands of male and female model workers have been selected from a wide range of sectors. A few model workers also came from ethnic minority groups to showcase the ethnic unity policy of the Chinese Communist Party (CCP). Higher authorities take charge of the decision on selecting a model worker based on their work performance, and political consciousness, patriotism, "worship of science," activities in environmental protection, and the pursuit of excellence. Central and provincial-level departments in China select national model workers. Some cities and large companies also have processes for selecting and praising local model workers.

Displaying the ideals of socialism, model workers bear the highest expectations from the new state to guide and correct their fellow workers in everyday production and behavior. The Model Workers are supposed to inspire people by their own work performance and political consciousness by setting good examples. People learn from the Model Workers and can become the new citizens the state requires. On the other hand, the Model Worker is also a coercive project. It attempts at aggressively correct people who are outliers of the new socialist scheme. Outliers become "bad elements" in contrast to the "good" Model Workers and the outliers are also forced to reform themselves.

The state consistently uses model worker as one of the central propaganda strategies to realize socialist goals. As a political term, it originates from the Yan'an period of the Chinese Communist Party in the 1930s. The party leaders introduced the Soviet Stakhanovite model and hoped to increase agricultural and industrial productivity when it was cut off from military resources in the Shaan-Gan-Ning border region. After the Communist Revolution in 1949, the Model Worker policy continues as a fundamental component of the political and cultural system in the new state. It plays a key role in many of the political campaigns such as the Great Leap Forward by setting up exemplary workers who define the ideal production. As a propaganda tool, the Model Worker has wide visual representations in cinema and posters to broadcast the ideals of the socialist state to China's vast population. Underlying the propaganda, the appeals of nationalism, the development of socialism and economic prosperity based on a new system propel the application of Model Worker in the People's Republic. The Maoist ideology composed of these three elements seeks to transform people's thought and behaviors on the road of creating new citizens for the new socialist China. The Model Workers represents the concrete examples of how the state wishes to intervene in the daily lives and production of ordinary people.

Model workers are often afforded privileges not available to other citizens or Communist Party members. "The possibility to become a model worker offered peasants and workers one of the few opportunities for upward mobility other than joining the army," writes scholar Yu Miin-lin. Model workers have an easier time joining the Communist Party, and also to become a higher-level cadre, manager, or other leader.

== Historical development ==
=== The Republican era (1936-1949) ===
The Communist Party promoted the ideals of model workers in the border regions. This discourse sought to change popular attitudes toward physical laborer from "suffering" to "glory" through emulation of "labor heroes". It sought to frame labor as central to building personal dignity, prosperity in the family, social recognition, and the development of the state.

In the late 1930s, the Chinese Communist Party (CCP) introduced the Soviet Stakhanovism to the Shaan-Gan-Ning border region under its control. Decades of military conflict with Kuomintang forced the CCP to the northwest, where it strove to survive by promoting agricultural productivity and military strength. Stakhanovism originated from the Second Five-Year Plan of the Soviet Union and carried strong Soviet traits. However, the Chinese Communist leadership did not borrow the idea without mediation. Under the influence of the Stakhanovist predecessor, Model Worker campaigns were launched to increase productivity and the popularity of the Party among the people in the border region.

Stakhanovism was rooted in Russian literature and the Soviet context. It refers to an optimistic hero who was willing to devote himself to the larger good. He acts without meaningless talk. It later referred to young soldiers in the Communist brigades who were diligent and efficient in fulfilling production quotas. The Soviet leaders realized the potential significance of the Stakhanovite image in promoting productivity facing the Second Five-Year Plan. They made miners and other obscure workers as “national heroes” nationwide to stimulate competition to complete the production quota. Stakhanovism thus symbolized the labor momentum to construct socialism in the Soviet Union. The ideal Stakhanovite refers to someone who bridged the gap between manual labor and mental labor, and someone who worked efficiently but could enjoy high class culture during leisure times.

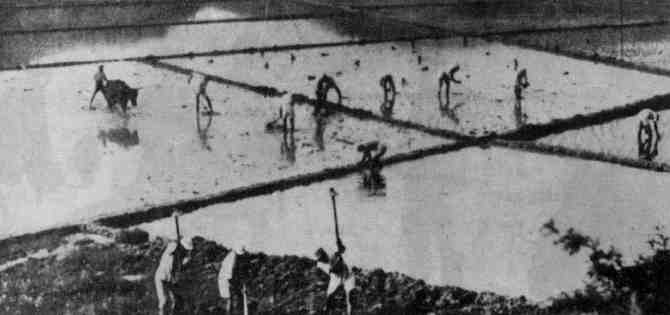
Soldiers from 359th brigade of the Eighth Route Army working at Nanniwan in 1943

When the Soviet Stakhanovite movement was about to run out of steam due to routinization by mid 1930s, the Chinese Communist Party sought to borrow the idea for the border region under its control. The Party aimed at eradicating the three major differences that haunted China: the difference between manual labor and mental labor, the difference between the city and the countryside, and the difference between factory work and farm work. And the Stakhanovite fit into the scheme of bridging the gap between the three major differences and provided a ready-made example for the Party to remake the people.

The first CCP campaign to honor model works began in 1942. The CCP adapted the Soviet Stakhanovism to suit the practical situation on the ground. The earliest CCP mentioning of Stakhanovism can be dated back to 1936, though the Party did not implement Stakhanovite campaign until 1942 when the Kuomintang cut off from supplies in the border region. During the Great Production Campaign, the Party leaders selected Zhao Zhankui, a factory worker, as the Chinese Stakhanovite. The CCP leaders avoided using the wording of "Stakhanovite" to simplify the propaganda and Zhao Zhankui became equivalent of hard work and high political consciousness. Here high political consciousness referred broadly to the love for work and devotion to the public good.

As the Zhao Zhankui campaign proved successful, the CCP routinized the Model Worker system in the border region and carried it over across 1949 after its victory over the Kuomintang. The CCP leadership regularly held conferences for labor models in the border region and awarded them with certificates. Model Worker was one of the fundamental propaganda policies to stimulate economic production in the border region under the CCP.

Beginning in 1943, the Communist Party publicized the efforts of female model workers in agriculture.

=== Early PRC (1949-1966) ===
Four major national conferences for Model Workers were held in the 1950s until the end of the Cultural Revolution. Each conference marked significant milestones in the socialist construction of Maoist China. And the selection and the propaganda around Model Workers functioned as support for and confirmation of the official narrative.

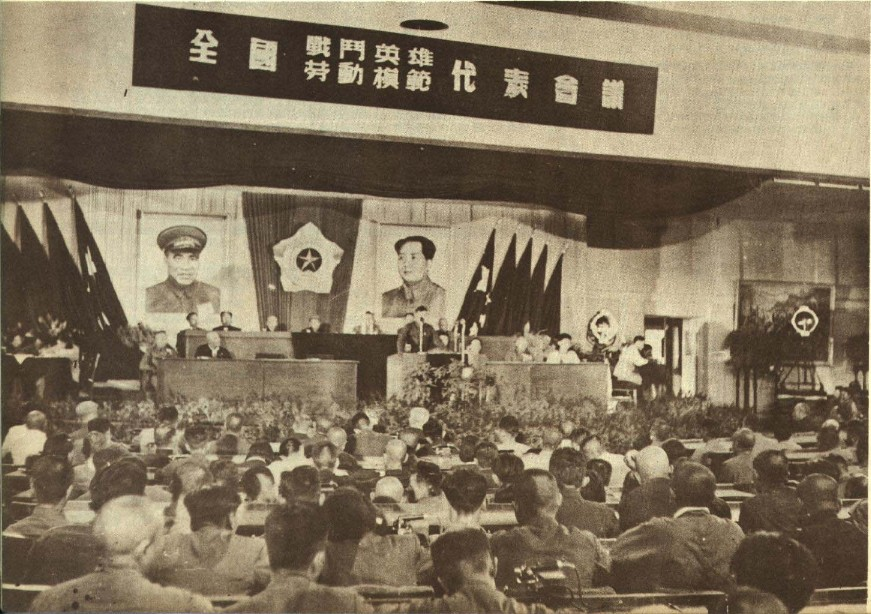
the 1950 National Conference for Model Workers of Battlefield Heroes, Workers, Peasants and Soldiers in Beijing

From September 25 to 30, 1950, the National Conference for Model Workers of Battlefield Heroes, Workers, Peasants and Soldiers was held in Beijing. Mao Zedong delivered a speech at the beginning of the Conference to celebrate the liberation of major parts of China thanks to the "excellence performance of workers from the military and economic fronts." Although the CCP just won the Civil War over Kuomintang, Mao warned that China still confronted the military threats from the "American imperialists" and Chiang Kai-shek regime on Taiwan, so it was imperative for the Chinese workers to continue consolidating national defense for the construction of the nation in the long term. To encourage workers to participate in building socialism, this conference awarded 464 model workers, among whom 208 were from the industrial sector, 198 from the agricultural sector, and 58 others from the military. About one tenth of the model workers were female. Liu Shaoqi, Vice-Chairman of the Central People's Government, Zhou Enlai, Premier of the State Council, Chen Yun, Vice-Premier of the State Council, and Nie Rongzhen, Acting Chief of the General Staff of the People's Liberation Army, also delivered addresses.

The CCP launched a series of radical social revolutions in the early 1950s. The Land Reform destroyed the traditional rural order by distributing land to peasants. The CCP leaders mobilized peasants to exert violent struggles against “class enemies” such as the “landlords” and “rich peasants.” When the Party announced the Land Reform successful, it implemented the Three- and Five-Anti Campaigns in the urban areas. The two Campaigns aimed at eradicating corruptive behavior and bureaucratic practices within the Party itself to preempt capitalist tendencies. Meanwhile, the Campaigns served to "rectify" the Model Workers to create pure new citizens. The National Conference of Representatives of Advanced Producers (Chinese: 全国先进生产者代表会议) took place in Beijing from April 30 to May 10, 1956. The Central Committee of the Chinese Communist Party and the State Council awarded the title of National Advanced Collective to 853 out of 5556 delegates and the title of National Advanced Producer to 4703 delegates. Mao Zedong, Liu Shaoqi, Zhou Enlai, Zhu De, and other Party and state officials attended the conference.

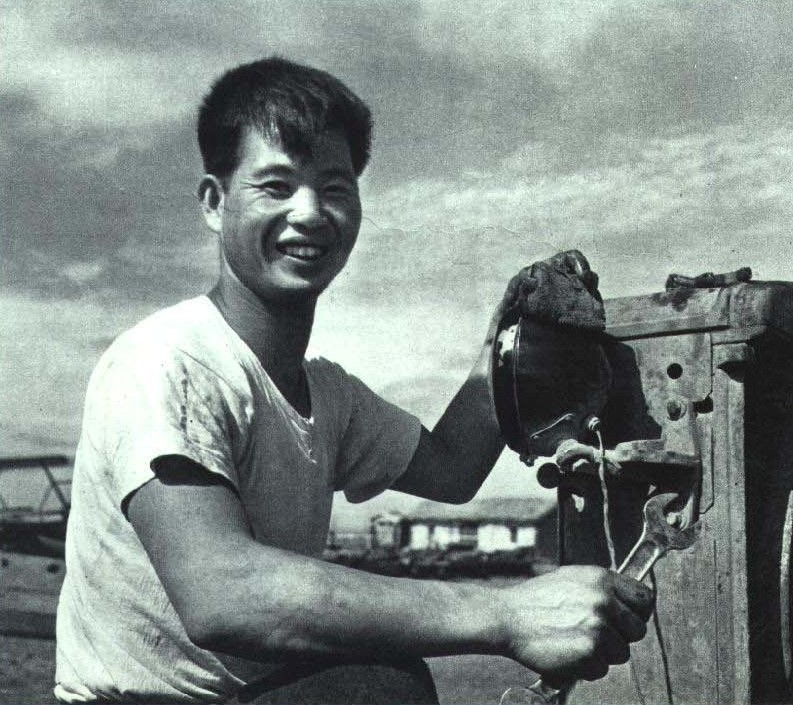
Hao Huanwen (郝焕文), Model Worker of the 1960s, Pioneer of the Great Northern Wilderness.

Many Model Workers were found to be indulged in materials comfort after the nominations. Yu Miin-lin lists several major categories of rewards Model Workers could receive. The first category was mainly honorific. The Model Worker Conference invited many attendees to Beijing, providing them with a unique opportunity to explore the capital. The second reward concerns promising official careers as party members. Many Model Workers thus became party members, enjoying a smooth and fast route of upward mobility. As a new invention after 1949, the third category includes superior material gains compared to their co-workers. Model Workers enjoyed vacation, the chance to travel abroad to the Soviet Union and housing offers. All these honorific and material provisions made Model Workers a privileged class in Maoist China. Some of them refused to treat their former co-workers equally, believing they were inferior to them. They not only failed to complete their own tasks but also asked others to do it for them. Acts like these greatly jeopardized the reputation of the Model Workers and the propaganda related to it.

The National Congress of Advanced Collectives and Advanced Producers in Socialist Construction in Industry, Transportation, Capital Construction, Finance and Trade (全国工业、交通运输、基本建设、财贸方面社会主义建设先进集体和先进生产者代表大会), known as the National Qunyin Conference (Chinese: 全国群英会), took place in Beijing from October 25 to November 8, 1959. There were 6,577 delegates, and the CPC Central Committee and the State Council conferred 2,565 titles to national advanced collectives and 3,267 titles to national advanced producers. On October 25, the Congress commenced at the Great Hall of the People, attended by Party and state leaders including President Liu Shaoqi, Premier Zhou Enlai, Chairman of the Standing Committee of the National People's Congress Zhu De, and Vice Premier Deng Xiaoping, with Liu Ningyi, Chairman of the All China Federation of Trade Unions, officiating the opening ceremony. Li Fuchun, Bo Yibo, Tan Zhenlin, Li Xiannian, Nie Rongzhen, Lu Dingyi, Hu Yaobang, and Cai Chang presented special reports. Zhou Enlai, Premier of the State Council, hosted a banquet for all delegates. Zeng Shan delivered the closing speech.

On International Women's Day in 1960, the designation of "March 8 Red Flag Bearer" was created to recognize more women among the ranks of model workers.

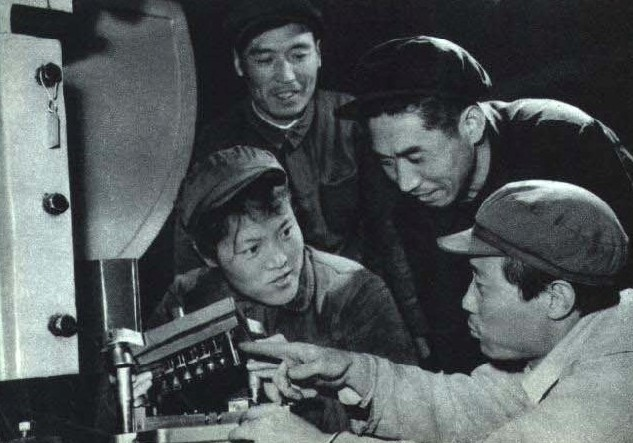
Female model worker Wei Fengying (尉凤英) enhances plant efficiency by upgrading procedure for cold stamping machining in 1964

From June 1 to 11, 1960, the National Conference of Representatives of Advanced Units and Workers in Socialist Construction in Education, Culture, Health, Sports, and Journalism (Chinese: 全国教育和文化、卫生、体育、新闻方面社会主义建设先进单位和先进工作者代表大会, 全国文教群英会) convened in Beijing. A total of 5806 delegates attended the meeting, during which the CCP Central Committee and State Council awarded the title of National Advanced Unit to 3092 units and the title of National Advanced Worker to 2686 individuals. On June 1, the meeting commenced in the Great Hall of the People, attended by leaders like Liu Shaoqi, Zhou Enlai, Zhu De, Soong Ching Ling, Dong Biwu, and Deng Xiaoping.

The Model Workers publicity provided examples of hard work and political devotion to the Party's calls. All kinds of posters and stories about heroic deeds of Model Workers in iron production were disseminated nationwide as inspiration for people to believe in the possibility of "Exceeding the UK, catching the USA." (Chinese: 赶英超美) As women became increasingly needed to work in agriculture and industry, and encouraged by policies of the Great Leap Forward to do so, the phenomenon of Iron Women model workers arose. Women did traditionally male work in both fields and factories, including major movements of women into management positions. Women competed for high productivity, and those who distinguished themselves came to be called Iron Girls.

=== The Cultural Revolution Period (1966-1976) ===
The Cultural Revolution interrupted the Model Workers' selection process and national conferences. James Farley argues that the Model Workers propaganda campaigns in fact laid the foundation for the arrival of the Cultural Revolution. The creation of "pure" and "perfected" model workers brewed the cult of personality for Mao. For example, Lei Feng embodies all the qualities the state requires for socialist construction, including love for the nation, selflessness, devotion to work without thinking about repayment, etc.

During the Cultural Revolution, many Model Workers were heavily struggled against by the Red Guards because of their family background and/or their previous association with “bourgeois” lifestyles. Some other model workers joined the Red Guards and the Revolutionary Committee, taking the orders from above to struggle against others. They soon lost power after the 10-year turmoil during the Cultural Revolution.

=== Reform era (1977-2000) ===
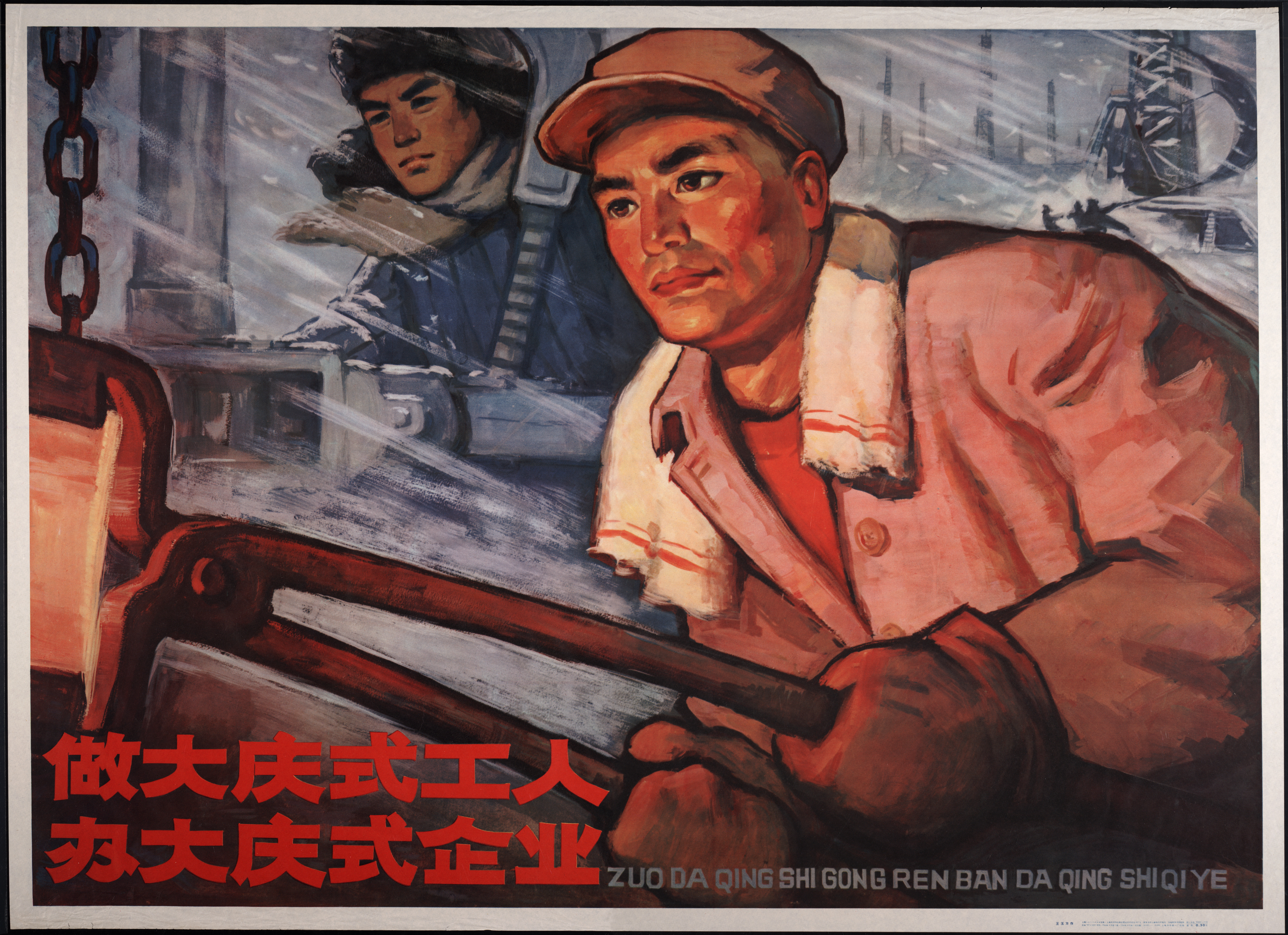
Enterprises of the Daqing Style

The selection and national conference of Model Workers did not resume until 1977, when the National Conference for Learning from Daqing was held in the Daqing Oil Field and Beijing. On April 20, 1977, the conference took place at the Daqing Oil Field and in Beijing. From May 14 to May 20, 1977, over 7,000 delegates from the CCP Central Committee and the State Council recognized 385 companies as National Advanced Producers and 2,126 companies as National Daqing-style companies. The meeting began at the Daqing Oilfield, led by Chairman of the CCP Central Committee and Premier Hua Guofeng. Vice Premier Li Xiannian gave the opening address, and Song Zhenming, Secretary of the CCP Daqing Municipal Party Committee, talked about the basic experiences of Daqing. The conference also called for the further elimination of the Gang of Four, and tried to motivate people all across the country to learn from Daqing's perseverance in technology and frugality in management.

The National Science Conference took place in Beijing from March 18 to 31, 1978. Approximately 6,000 delegates participated in the conference, during which the CCP Central Committee and the State Council conferred 826 titles to national advanced collectives and 1,213 titles to national advanced scientific and technology workers. The conference commenced at the Great Hall of the People on March 18, with Hua Guofeng, Chairman of the CCP Central Committee and Premier of the State Council, presiding over the opening ceremony, while Deng Xiaoping, Vice-Chairman of the CCP Central Committee and Vice-Premier of the State Council, presented a report. This conference was a significant assembly conducted during a period when the country required extensive efforts, and it is also considered a pivotal event in the history of China's scientific and technological advancement.

The National Finance and Trade Conference (Chinese: 全国财贸学大庆学大寨会议) took place in Beijing from June 20 to July 9, 1978. Over 5,000 delegates from the CCP Central Committee and the State Council gave 736 businesses the National Finance and Trade Front Daqing-style enterprise designation and named 381 people National Model Workers and Advanced Producers. On June 20, the General Assembly commenced at the Great Hall of the People, presided over by Chairman Huaguofeng with Vice Chairman Li Xiannian. These conferences at the beginning of the reform era differed from each other in title, scale, frequency, subjects, and selection criteria. The national conference for Model Workers had not yet been institutionalized.

On September 28, 1979, the State Council recognized advanced businesses in industrial transportation and capital construction at the National Model Workers Conference (Chinese: 国务院表彰工业交通、基本建设战线全国先进企业和全国劳动模范大会) held in the Great Hall of the People in Beijing. The meeting hosted 340 delegates, during which the State Council conferred 118 titles of National Advanced Enterprises and 222 titles of National Model Workers. Hua Guofeng, Deng Xiaoping, Li Xiannian, and Ye Jianying, participated at the summit. On December 28, 1979, the State Council recognized the exemplary national units in agriculture, finance and trade, education, health, and scientific research during the National Model Workers Conference (Chinese: 国务院表彰农业、财贸、教育、卫生、科研战线全国先进单位和全国劳动模范大会) convened at the Great Hall of the People. The meeting had 691 delegates, with the State Council conferring 351 titles to national advanced units and 340 titles to national model workers. Hua Guofeng, Deng Xiaoping, and Li Xiannian participated in the conference.

From 1989 onwards, the national conference for Model Workers underwent increasing institutionalization in three ways. First, all the various previous names of the conference became "The National Conference for Appraising Model Workers and Advanced Producers". Second, it became a comprehensive conference covering both mental and manual laborers from all sectors. All workers enjoy the same standards of appraisal and rewards. Third, the selection of Model Workers became regular, taking place every five years, with each time awarding around 3,000 people. The system of "Two Reviews and Three Public Releases" was established to ensure that two reviews and three public releases on the departmental, local and national media will be made before the Model Workers are finalized.

Beijing hosted the National Commendation Conference for Model Workers and Advanced Workers from September 28 to October 2, 1989. The congress hosted 3,065 participants, and the State Council recognized 2,790 individuals as national model workers and national advanced workers. On September 28, the congress commenced at the Great Hall of the People, attended by Jiang Zemin, Li Peng, Yang Shangkun, and Wan Li.

On April 29, 1995, the National Commendation Conference for Model and Advanced Workers took place. Over 7,000 individuals participated in the meeting. Jiang Zemin delivered a speech at the conference. The Standing Committee of the Political Bureau, comprising Jiang Zemin, Li Peng, Qiao Shi, Li Ruihuan, Zhu Rongji, Liu Huaqing, and Hu Jintao, participated in the meeting. The CCP Central Committee resolved to commend 2,877 national model and advanced workers.

On April 29, 2000, the National Commendation Conference for Model and Advanced Workers convened at the Great Hall of the People. Jiang Zemin, Li Peng, Zhu Rongji, Li Ruihuan, Hu Jintao, Wei Jianxing, and Li Lanqing convened a meeting and resolved to confer the honorary title of National Model Worker upon 1,931 individuals and the honorary title of National Advanced Worker upon 1,015 individuals. During the conference, the CCP Central Committee and the State Council explicitly stated for the first time that the National Model Worker is the preeminent accolade awarded by the state to laborers.

=== 21st century (2001-Present) ===
On April 30, 2005, the 2005 National Conference honoring Model Workers and Advanced Workers (Chinese: 2010年全国劳动模范和先进工作者表彰大会) took place in the Great Hall of the People in Beijing. The Politburo Standing Committee of the Chinese Communist Party, including Hu Jintao, Wen Jiabao, Jia Qinglin, Zeng Qinghong, Huang Ju, Wu Guanzheng, Li Changchun, and Luo Gan, convened a meeting that resolved to bestow the honorary title of National Model Worker upon 2,124 individuals and the honorary title of National Advanced Worker upon 845 individuals.

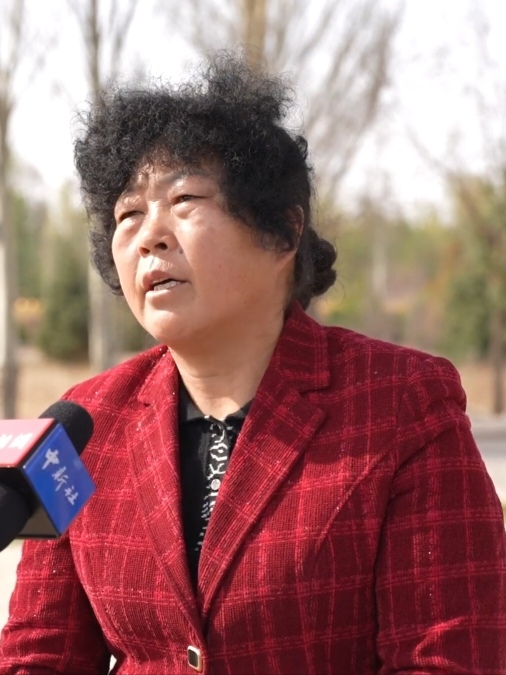
Model worker Yin Yuzhen has dedicated over forty years to the management of the Mu Us Desert and is renowned as the "Heroine of Sand Control."

On April 27, 2010, the 2010 National Commendation Conference for Model and Advanced Workers (Chinese: 2010年全国劳动模范和先进工作者表彰大会) took place in the Great Hall of the People in Beijing. The Politburo Standing Committee of the Chinese Communist Party, including Hu Jintao, Wu Bangguo, Jia Qinglin, Li Changchun, Xi Jinping, Li Keqiang, He Guoqiang, and Zhou Yongkang attended. The conference resolved to bestow the honorary title of National Model Workers on 2,115 individuals and the title of National Advanced Workers on 870 individuals.

On April 28, 2015, the General Assembly to Commemorate May Day and Recognize National Model Workers and Advanced Workers (Chinese: 2015年庆祝“五一”国际劳动节暨表彰全国劳动模范和先进工作者大会) convened at the Great Hall of the People in Beijing. Xi Jinping, Li Keqiang, Zhang Dejiang, Yu Zhengsheng, Wang Qishan, Zhang Gaoli, and Liu Yunshan attended this conference, which resolved to bestow the honorary titles of National Model Workers on 2,064 individuals and National Advanced Workers on 904 individuals. In his speech celebrating model workers, Xi emphasized that of the twelve socialist core values, patriotism is "the deepest, the most fundamental, and the most enduring value."

On November 24, 2020, the 2020 National Commendation Conference for Model and Advanced Workers (Chinese: 2020年全国劳动模范和先进工作者表彰大会) took place at the Great Hall of the People in Beijing. Xi Jinping, Li Keqiang, Li Zhanshu, Wang Yang, Wang Huning, Zhao Leji, and Han Zheng attended this conference, which resolved to bestow the title of national model workers upon 1,689 individuals and the title of national advanced workers upon 804 individuals.

== Criteria for selection ==
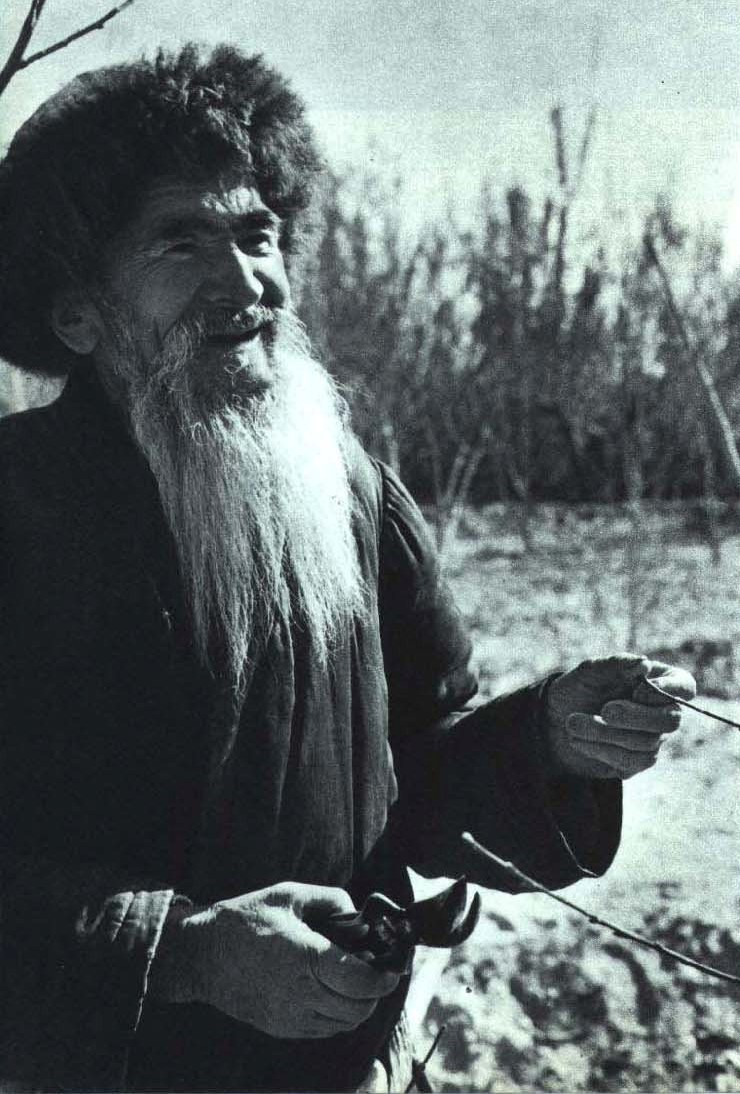
Shayfu Shayti (沙依甫·沙依提), a Model Forestry Worker in Hotan Region in 1964

Model Workers are selected at various administrative levels to reward those workers who make great contribution to the construction of socialism. From the State Department to provincial, from municipal to county, governments award the honorific title of "Model Worker" to workers regularly. In theory, workers need to receive recommendations from the "mass" and then local governments above the county-level grant nominations to these workers. Due to the varying administrative levels of the governments that confer nominations, Model Workers likewise exhibit differing levels. The State Department nominates National Model Workers, whilst province and municipal governments, as well as autonomous regional authorities, nominate province Model Workers. Individuals designated by municipal and county authorities are recognized as Model Workers at the municipal and county levels. Model Workers at all levels possess distinct qualities. Only individuals who satisfy the criteria may be designated as Model Workers.

The specific requirements for the contribution to the society vary due to different levels (national, local, and departmental) of the Model Workers. However, the general principle remains the same. For instance, the State Department may nominate anyone who meets the following criteria as a Model Worker:

1. People who greatly accomplish and overfill the production quota planned by the state.
2. People who greatly improve the quality of products.
3. People who greatly save material resources, money, and labor, especially power, fuel, and raw materials.
4. People who greatly transform and promote new technologies.
5. People who greatly contribute to the research of science and technology, the design of products, and engineering.
6. People who greatly contribute to production, transportation, logistics, construction, and management.
7. People who greatly contribute to commerce (including foreign trade), the service sector, and finance.
8. People who greatly contribute to culture, education, public health, and sports.
9. People who greatly contribute to the administrative work for enterprises, industries, and research institutions.

Aside from contributing to society, attitudes towards society are another strand of criteria to select Model Workers. In other words, the Communist Party leadership selects Model Workers on the basis of their political consciousness and loyalty to the Party-state. Model Workers at all levels need to adhere to four principles: correctly treat the leadership of the Chinese Communist Party, Marxist–Leninism and Mao Zedong thought, People's Dictatorship, and the socialist course. The Model Workers should also adopt communist working attitudes, such as dismissing time and payment. Moreover, the Party mandates all Model Workers to love the Party and the state genuinely, love socialism and the people, love labor, struggle for the benefits of the Party-state, and possess the sense of devotion for the construction of socialist material and spiritual civilizations.

Only individuals who significantly contribute to society and exhibit high political consciousness are eligible for selection and nomination as Model Workers.

== Notable model workers ==
=== Zhao Zhankui 赵占魁 ===
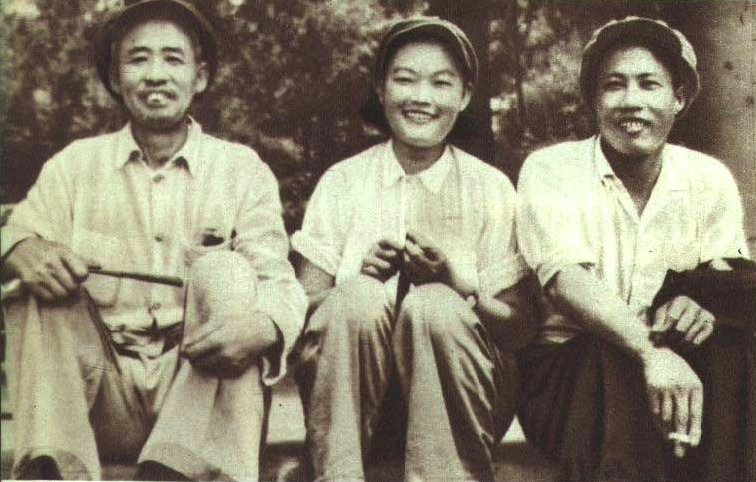
Zhao Zhankui, Li Fenglian, and Zhen Rongdian at the National Congress of Model Workers in 1950.

Zhao Zhankui (1896-1973) was born in a poor peasant's family in Dingxiang County, Shanxi Province. He was awarded as “National Model Worker” in 1950 for his engagement in the “Zhao Zhankui Campaign” in the Shaan-Gan-Ning Border region in the late 1940s. Zhao is one of the first Model Workers and most important activist in the labor movement of early PRC.

Zhao Zhankui was born in a small village in Dingxiang County of Shanxi. Due to his poverty, Zhao left his hometown to work as an apprentice in a blacksmith's shop. Staying in Taiyuan until 1938, Zhao wandered as worker for a copper factory, Taiyuan Arsenal, the Datong-Puzhou Railway. After the invading Japanese troop occupied Taiyuan, Zhao and other workers for the Datong-Puzhou Railway went to Yan’an. In May 1938, Zhao Zhankui entered the Anwu Youth Training Program and later transferred to the Yan’an Workers’ School. One year later, Zhao requested to work in the Yan’an Agricultural Tools Factory where he made great contribution to the making of agricultural tools and military arsenal. In lack of raw materials, machinery, experience and adequate technology, Zhao Zhankui overcame the difficulties with “great passion.” He focused on learning the technology to improve productivity while saving the raw materials and fuel. He was also “keen” at teaching apprentices. Zhao was praised for introducing technical innovations.

Mao Zedong praised Zhao in late 1942, stating that the CPC should "develop a Zhao Zhankui movement in every factory." In 1943, the Party official launched the “Zhao Zhankui Campaign” calling for everyone in the border region to learn from Zhao Zhankui. People at the time compared Zhao Zhankui of Yan'an to "Stakhanov of the Soviet Union". Under the propaganda of the CCP, Zhao Zhankui became not only a role model for work, but also an example for thought. The CCP leadership sought to use the Zhao Zhankui Campaign to improve people's attitude towards work, and to promote the overall productivity in the border region.

After the “Zhao Zhankui Campaign”, Zhao continued to be active in labor movements and politics. In 1948, he attended the Sixth National Labor Conference. In 1949 and 1950, he was elected as the representative for the National People's Congress, and the standing committee member of the Northwestern Labor Union. The Central Government also appointed him as the Vice Minister of the Ministry of Labor for the Northwestern Military and Political Committee.

=== Huang Baomei 黄宝妹 ===
Huang Baomei (1931-) was born into an impoverished family in Pudong, Shanghai. At the age of 12, she earned a living with her mother as salt peddlers on the street. One year later, Huang became a child textile worker in the Japanese Yufeng Cotton Mill. When the Communist Party took over the factory, it was "nationalized" and renamed as the Shanghai No.17 Cotton Mill.

Huang Baomei was reported to invent a novel way of spinning when she continued to work for the Shanghai No.17 Cotton Mill. Saving the roller lap in spinning, Huang Baomei's technology was reported to save one third of the human labor and enabled the machine to run 24 hours a day; Huang was said to be the best female worker in the Shanghai No.17 Cotton Mill to waste the least roller lap. Because of her “outstanding work performance”, Huang was honored the National Model Worker title twice in 1956 and 1959, and received the opportunity to meet Chairman Mao.

As a National Model Worker, Huang Baomei started to influence many other ordinary people through propaganda. The “advanced life” of her was soon made into a film where Huang Baomei and her co-workers all starred themselves. The film turned out to be successful owing to the “genuine” feelings of the actresses that might have better engaged the audience. Just like other propaganda films of this period, Huang Baomei was filled with state indoctrination, urging viewers to participate in the socialist construction whole-heartedly like the protagonist.

The social impact of National Model Worker Huang Baomei also lies in her fashion choices. According to historian Kar Gerth, Huang Baomei became a fashion icon after her trip to the Soviet Union. Seeing the pretty outfit of Soviet women, Huang felt inspired to follow suit since the Soviet clothing style represented the best version of socialism to her. Back in China, the Soviet-influenced Huang Baomei was broadcast by the state media. Not only did her female colleagues in the factory imitate her style. Women across the whole country who saw Huang Baomei's picture started to desire for the style. By the example of Huang Baomei, Professor Gerth argues that the state sought to channel people's consumerist desires to the direction it wanted.

=== Wang Jinxi ===
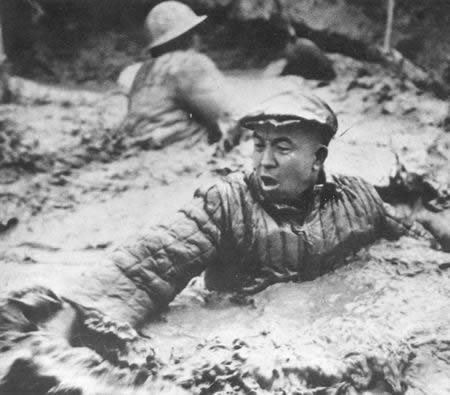
"Iron Man" Wang Jinxi blocking the blowout in the mud pool

"Iron Man" Wang Jinxi was the most significant model worker in Daqing oil field, and remains one of the most celebrated working class models in China. An experienced oil worker from the Yumen Oil Field, Wang was one of the first oil workers to arrive to work the Daqing field in Saertu. At Daqing, Wang was one of the first model workers selected by Yu Qiuli due to Wang's devotion to the oil production industry and to competitive work. He repeatedly led his drilling team in reaching new records. Wang was promoted at conferences and ceremonies, including a ten thousand person swearing in ceremony for the drilling campaign in Saertu where he cheered what became his famous slogans, "I am willing to sacrifice twenty years of my life to develop a big oil field for the motherland!" and "Charge when the conditions are ripe, and charge even when the conditions do not permit it!"

Wang was appointed vice head of the Daqing Drilling Headquarters. In 1968, he was appointed vice director of the Daqing Revolutionary Committee (such Revolutionary Committees were replacing government bodies during that stage of the Cultural Revolution). In 1969 he was appointed to the Communist Party's Central Committee. Wang died of cancer in 1970.

=== Other notable workers ===
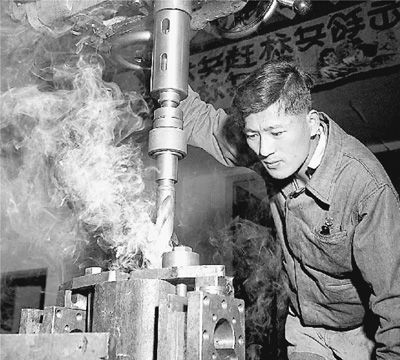
Ni Zhifu, model worker in 1959

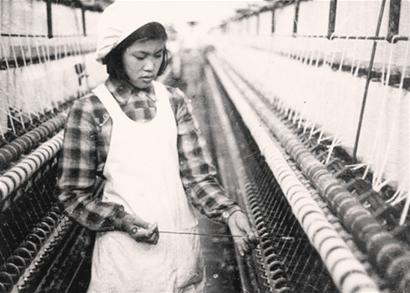
Hao Jianxiu, model worker in 1951

Wu Manyou was publicized as a "labor hero" through campaigns to "emulate Wu Manyou" in the Yan'an Soviet. Wu's statement that his success relied on the fact that he "ha[d] no secret, but to work" was emphasized in political discourse to draw a contrast to the old rural ruling class, which was described as despising labor and exploiting the laboring class to enrich itself. Another Yan'an-era figure deemed a labor hero was Liu Jianzhang, director of the South District Cooperative, which was promoted throughout the border region as a model of people-managed cooperative.

One of the earliest model workers was the teenage textile worker Hao Jianxiu (awarded 1951), who invented the "Hao Jianxiu Work Method". She was sent to study at East China Textile Engineering Institute and was elevated to the upper echelon of Chinese politics, serving as Minister of Textile Industry, secretary of the CPC Central Secretariat, and vice chair of the State Planning Commission.

Another prominent model worker was Ni Zhifu (awarded 1959), a fitter who invented the "Ni Zhifu drill". He was elevated to leadership positions in the municipal governments of Beijing, Shanghai, and Tianjin, and became a member of the Politburo of the Chinese Communist Party. He also served as Chairman of the All-China Federation of Trade Unions.

Meng Tai was the most prominent model worker from Anshan Iron and Steel Company (Angang). Among Meng's accomplishments was collecting a trove of machine parts which were used to restore Angang's Blast Furnace No. 2 (later nicknamed, Meng Tai warehouse). Meng was seated to the National People's Congress in 1954. In 1959 he was named a National Model Worker. Another model worker from Angang, Wang Chonglun, organized the Wang Chonglun Advanced Producer School in December 1953, modeled on the Stakhanovite School of the Soviet Union. Wang also invented a semi-automated drilling machine that increased worker speed by a factor of fourteen. The experiences of Meng and Wang are portrayed in the 2022 film Steel Will.

Geng Changsuo was designated as a national model worker for his contributions to agriculture. He was also a village-level official in Hebei province.

Liang Jun was a model worker regarded as the first Chinese female tractor driver.

Bao Wenxi was a history teacher and labor model regularly consulted by PRC officials on educational policy.

Shi Chuanxiang was a night soil porter and national model worker.

Guo Qingsi was a national model worker celebrated for his use of hydraulic mining for coal.

== Culture ==
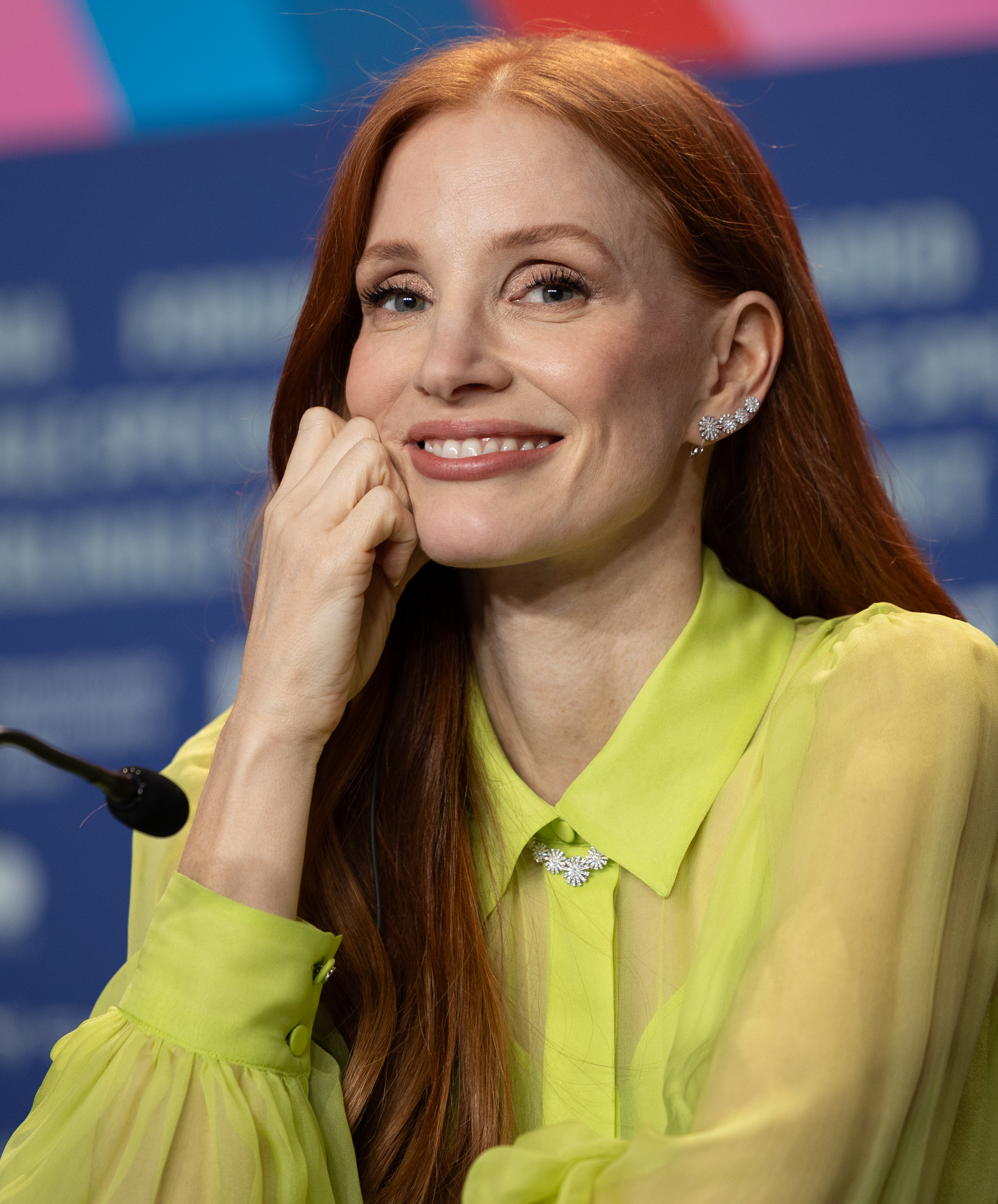
Jessica Chastain was endearingly referred to as "Lady Model Worker" by her Chinese fans

In the 21st century, the term "Model worker" remains a favorable character assessment in Chinese society. In 2011, Jessica Chastain, who featured in several films including The Tree of Life, The Help, Wilde Salomé, Texas Killing Fields, Coriolanus, Take Shelter, was referred to as "Lady Model Worker" by her Chinese fans due to her exceptionally diligent spirit. Jessica is thrilled with this nickname.

Chinese swimmer Zhang Yufei claimed gold and established a new Olympic record in the 200-meter butterfly final at the 2020 Summer Olympics. Merely 80 minutes later, in the women's 4×200 meter freestyle relay final, Zhang Yufei and her teammates shattered the world record and secured another gold medal. To secure these two gold medals, she completed 12 swims, earning commendation from the Chinese nation for her exceptional effort and perseverance, thus leading the media to label her a "Model Worker". In 2024, Zhang Yufei secured 1 silver and 5 bronze medals in the 2024 Paris Olympics, in addition to 2 golds and 2 silvers at the preceding Tokyo Olympics, amassing a total of 10 medals across two Olympic Games, thus establishing a new record for a single Chinese Olympic champion.

== See also ==
- Udarnik
- We Can Do It!
- Serve the People
- Three Old Articles (China)
- The Foolish Old Man Removes the Mountains
- Equal pay for equal work
- March 8th Red Banner Pacesetter
