= Yin Yuzhen =

Chinese environmental activist

- 殷玉珍
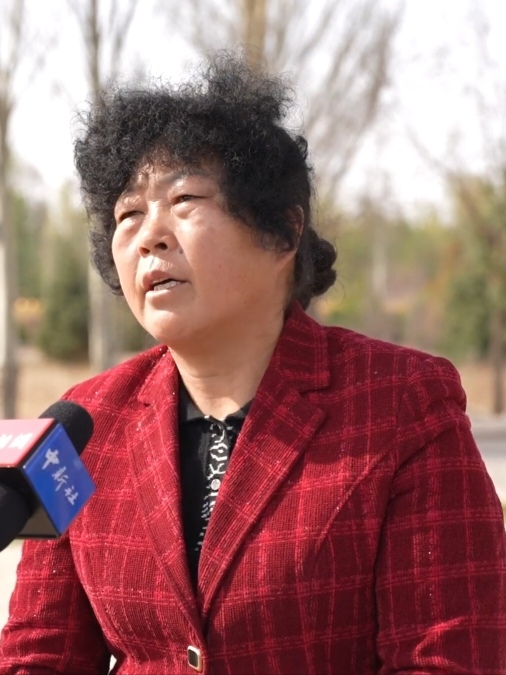
- Yin in 2024
- Born: 1965/1966
- Years active: 1985-present
- Known for: Combating desertification

Yin Yuzhen is a Chinese environmentalist known for her personal efforts to combat desertification over the course of 40 years. Yin has engaged in extensive tree-planting efforts in the Uxin Banner of China's semi-arid western region. Beginning in 1985, Yin experimented with various plants in her backyard aiming to combat soil erosion and improve the barren landscape. Over the years her efforts expanded, attracting the attention and support of local authorities and the community. Her reforestation project, starting as a personal initiative, gained significant recognition and state support, leading to substantial environmental improvements in the area.

== Early life ==
Yin Yuzhen was born in Jingbian County, Shaanxi Province, in a small village. As the fifth of seven siblings, she was accustomed to hard domestic work from an early age. Growing up poor, she did not have jewellery such as rings, necklaces, or earrings. Such luxurious items made no sense as her family could barely afford food to get by, let alone the clothes on their backs. Having not attended school, she was nineteen when her parents arranged her marriage to Bai Wanxiang, a resident of the Mu Us Desert.

She began her married life in a cave dwelling in the desert. She recalled the first time she set eyes on the dwelling, she wept for seven days, consuming only water. The floor was covered with firewood and dry deadwood. The roof of the house was constructed out of an assortment of wood tied together with rope and straw. The entrance required her to bend down to get inside. To sleep, she could only curl up into a ball. In the first forty days of living there, she did not see another human being. She was so deprived of other human interaction that the first human contact she had ended in failure. She ran to the man, ultimately scaring him off. She often contemplated hanging herself but stated that she simply did not have the ability to do it. She did not have the necessary materials and there was not a tree in sight for miles. The Mu Us Desert, covering 48,300 square kilometres (18,600 square miles), is described as a sterile environment with one wind per year traveling from the spring till winter. These winds made it difficult for outsiders to enter the village, essentially cutting Yin off from the rest of the country. She at times contemplated leaving the village. When consulting her husband on the matter, he begged her to stay with him as he would not survive in the desert alone. Frustrated with the living conditions, Yin decided she would rather wear herself down by planting trees to combat the desert than be consumed by it. As she worked to fight the desert, she created a song that she would sing to herself to keep her going through the troubling times:

Desert Hymn

The sandstorm in the Maowusa Desert is filling the skies

I wish for green trees in the desert to keep me company

I kept a tree alive and it started to spread

I wish that the lands would be fertile and abundant

== Tree planting ==
Yin sold the family's livestock in exchange for 600 saplings. The first ones she planted were in front of her home. Her husband had neither knowledge of forestation nor planting trees. Together they learned through significant trial and error. The harsh desert climate combated the initial saplings through powerful winds and significant drought. Out of the 600 saplings planted, only twelve survived. Determined, Yin pressed on using the surviving twelve to propel her journey forward. To purchase more saplings, the two worked odd jobs. They built houses and did farm work in exchange for saplings. Over the course of thirty years, Yin learned how to change a barren desert into a lush forest. Her efforts gradually attracted wildlife that had not lived in the land in decades. She treated the animals that came as her children.

Discovering that water sources in the desert were exceedingly deep (390 feet), predicting the weather became increasingly important based on the last snowfall. Several saplings were prepared in advance to anticipate the number of trees needed to be planted in that limited window to give them the best possible chance for survival.

Initially planting trees such as willows and poplars, Yin discovered that the lifespan of said trees only lasted several decades and found an alternative in pine trees that can last several thousand years. She has reclaimed more than 70,000 acres of desert as of 2025 as part of the Three-North Shelterbelt Project. In 2005, Yin was recognized as a model worker in China that safeguards the environment and quickly gained government support. With the government supporting her, the forestation rates significantly increased. Yin stated that before the media discovered her, she had nothing. Afterwards, numerous avenues of support and funds began to appear. She went from a humble individual to a national icon overnight. Yin was nominated for a Nobel Peace Prize from the Chinese government.

Funding these efforts, the Chinese government felt that this desert could be promptly tamed with the creation of a monocultural forest. Yin had expressed concerns for such a monocultural forest, especially the relative lack of ecological balance resulting from the mass planting of trees. Previously, poplar trees were planted in mass amounts, quickly growing and thriving on deep groundwater. This depleted valuable groundwater resources and resulted in further desertification. The use of a monocultural forest accelerated the very desertification it sought to combat. The rapid state-sponsored target-driven forestation would destroy the very ecosystems that they were trying to create and save. Efforts such as these in the name of ecological salvation can do more harm than good such as green-grabbing in the name of tree conservation and planting that can uproot individuals that are living in the environment that is targeted. Yin has noted that her trees are deprived of topsoil and do require constant watering for the moment as a result of this green grabbing. With her trial and error experience to develop a self-sufficient ecosystem, a diversification of various factors such as animal and fungal species and trees exists alongside each other is essential. Poplar trees can be quite profitable as the cutting and selling of these quick-growing trees make up 57.9% of the Uxin Banner in 2019.

== Response ==
As a result of her overall success, Yin has gained significant government support and has been able to plant watermelons, pear trees, peach trees, apricot trees, and other plants. Her backyard experiment was built into an ecological park, the production of which generates considerable revenue for Yin and her family. Her environment is in constant expansion due to outside investment attempting to meet China's afforestation efforts. Yin states that she cares about what people think of her now, feeling as though she has to be constantly viewed as a model worker, which the Chinese government imposed on her.

Yin states that she feels like a warrior emerging from gunfire when she is surrounded by her trees, which give her strength. She views the trees and the animals that inhabit them as her children. She has left her old dwelling behind for a modern house and has four children and six grandchildren. In her later years, Yin constantly looks to grow in other aspects of her life; she now has an ecologically friendly restaurant, office building, and a patriotism education base in her vicinity.

Her work inspired others in her village to undertake similar tree planting projects to control the sand. Her once-barren farm is now an ecological tourism center, hosting visitors from different walks of life to come and observe. Even before Yin initiated her project, in 1978, China launched anti-desertification efforts in an attempt to combat desert areas of Northern China. Data according to the State Forestry Administration shows that the forest stratification has grown from 5.05% in 1977 to 12.4% in 2012 Many have attributed feats like this to Yin Yuzhen, who looks to expand her legacy onward and hopes to draw out economic opportunities from previously desolate land by harvesting mass amounts of economic crops.

== Mentorship ==
In 2014, American Donald Ashton Jones visited Yin and joined in her tree planting efforts. He learned to plant trees and worked alongside Yin to plant over 50 trees per day. Over 10 years, he planted over 2,000 trees in the desert. In 1999, American Ronald Sakolsky donated $5,000 anonymously to plant trees. Yin re-established contact with him in 2026 after an extensive search. She stated that she had never seen that much money, and that with it she had purchased many saplings which have since grown into 50,000 trees. Similarly, a South Korean family donates money to the project and visits annually.

== Awards and recognition ==
Yin's afforestation efforts have been recognized by individuals such as Chinese Communist Party general secretary Xi Jinping, who, during the 2020 National People's Congress, described the actions of those such as Yin as a remarkable achievement and an overall improvement of the ecology in China. As well as being nominated for a Nobel Peace Prize by the Chinese government, Yin has received over sixty awards in China as abroad. In 2013 she was awarded the Somazzi Prize, awarded to those who exemplify efforts of astounding peace and achievement regarding human rights. Later in 2015, she was recognized by China and elected to be one of the Top 10 "Love Your Hometown" Figures of the Year.

== See also ==
- Li Yunsheng
