= New Man (utopian concept) =

Utopian concept involving the creation of a new ideal human being or citizen

The New Man is a utopian concept that involves the creation of a new ideal human being or citizen replacing un-ideal human beings or citizens. The meaning of a New Man has widely varied and various alternatives have been suggested by a variety of religions and political ideologies.

== Philosophical and religious versions ==
=== Baháʼí New Race of Men ===
Baháʼí literature states that training children in the world-embracing teachings of Baháʼu'lláh will cause a "truly new race of men" to emerge ("khalq-i-jadíd", also translated as a "new creation" by Shoghi Effendi or as "spiritual rebirth"). The Bab in a letter, after expounding the purpose of his message, declares triumphantly "Wherefore are all part of a New Creation (khalq-i-jadíd) for We, we indeed originated that [new] creation...We did indeed initiate a new, eschatological creation." Abdu'l Baha describes how "after the coming of the spiritual springtime, all phenomena become imbued with the life of a new creation and are reformed in the process of a new genesis". It is prophesied that a time is approaching when a new race of men will have been raised up that is "incomparable in character", who will be tasked with "helping to rebuild the world with the aid and inspiration of the Bahá'í teachings" and who will "purge mankind" of its current "defilement" and corruption. Abdu'l Baha explains that the only remedy to the current societal trend towards self-centered materialism is the power of a "new creation" where "the hearts and souls be revived" by "the breaths of the holy spirit." In the process of working towards the more just, unified society envisioned by Baha'u'llah, the Baha'i writings predict reactions of fear and dismay will emerge from some.

Baha'u'llah emphasises the selfless, altruistic nature of this new humanity that will come into being, writing that, "To be purged from defilement is to be cleansed of that which is injurious to man and detracteth from his high station—among which is to take undue pleasure in one's own words and deeds, however worthy they may be. True peace and tranquillity will only be realized when every soul will have become the well-wisher of all mankind." The Baháʼí writings also clarify that the initial response of fear will be short-lived, saying, "The fears and agitation which the revelation of this [God's] law provokes in men's hearts should indeed be likened to the cries of the suckling babe weaned from his mother's milk, if ye be of them that perceive. Were men to discover the motivating purpose of God's Revelation, they would assuredly cast away their fears, and, with hearts filled with gratitude, rejoice with exceeding gladness". Philosopher Ian Kluge identifies what he terms, "the process of revolution and transformation from within" as only a part of a wider process of radical change initiated in this current era of history, citing this quote from the Baha'i writings: the "whole creation was revolutionized and all that are in the heavens and all that are on earth were stirred to the depths. Through that Word the realities of all created things were shaken, were divided, separated, scattered, combined and reunited, disclosing entities of a new creation..."

The Baháʼí Faith also emphasises how this ideal human state is a distant goal towards which all must strive - "we can see that the process of recreating ourselves to be part of a new race of men will be an ongoing struggle for years to come". Abdu'l Baha writes that, "We must strive unceasingly and without rest to accomplish the development of the spiritual nature in man, and endeavor with tireless energy to advance humanity toward the nobility of its true and intended station". He also stresses, however, that we have no claim to moral superiority over others: "Let us therefore be humble, without prejudices... Let us never say, "I am a believer but he is an infidel," "I am near to God, whilst he is an outcast." We can never know what will be the final judgment!", further highlighting, "Who are we that we should judge? How shall we know who, in the sight of God, is the most upright man?"

Regarding this new state in humanity's evolution, it is also stated that "souls will arise and holy beings appear" who will "labor ceaselessly", "scatter in the world, and travel throughout all regions", "raise their voices in every assembly, and adorn and revive every gathering", "speak in every tongue, and interpret every hidden meaning", "reveal the mysteries of the Kingdom, and manifest unto everyone the signs of God", "perfume and revive the souls of men", and "reinvigorate the peoples and nations of the world". Baháʼí economist, John Huddleston, in discussing the three necessary dimensions required to achieve World Peace writes that "The first dimension is the creation of a new race of men: the adoption of the highest ethical standards by every man, woman, and child on the planet". In the Lights of Irfan annual publication, philosophy scholar Ian Kluge provides a comparative treatment of Baháʼí and Nietzschean concepts, including the Baháʼí new race of men and Nietzsche's Übermensch.

=== Nietzschean Übermensch ===
Philosopher Friedrich Nietzsche's concept of an Übermensch ("Overman") was that of a New Man who would be an example to humanity through an existentialist will to power that was vitalist and irrationalist in nature. Nietzsche developed the concept in response to his view of the herd mentality and inherent nihilism of Christianity, and the void in existential meaning that is realized with the death of God. Übermensch is the goal of humanity and the world-focused will of the Übermensch emerges as the new meaning of life on Earth, a norm-repudiating individual who overcomes himself and is the master in control of his impulses and passions.

== Political versions ==
=== Communist ===
The Soviet man was to be selfless, learned, healthy, muscular, and enthusiastic in spreading the communist Revolution. Adherence to Bolshevism, and later Marxism–Leninism, and individual behavior consistent with those philosophies' prescriptions, were among the crucial traits expected of the New Soviet man, which required intellectualism and hard discipline. He was not driven by crude impulses of nature but by conscious self-mastery, a belief that required the rejection of both innate personality and the unconscious, which Soviet psychologists therefore rejected.

He treated public property with respect, as if it were his own. He should regard himself as being Soviet (culturally, ethnically, and linguistically) rather than Russian, Ukrainian, Belarusian, or any of the many other people and cultures found in the USSR.

His work required exertion and austerity, to show the new man triumphing over his base instincts. Alexey Stakhanov's record-breaking day in mining coal caused him to be set forth as the exemplar of the "new man" and the members of Stakhanovite movements tried to become Stakhanovites.

This could also be a new woman; Pravda described the Soviet woman as someone who had and could never have existed before. Female Stakhanovites were rarer than male, but a quarter of all trade-union women were designated as "norm-breaking." For the Paris World Fair, Vera Mukhina depicted a momentual sculpture, Worker and Kolkhoz Woman, dressed in work clothing, pressing forward with his hammer and her sickle crossed.

Alexander Zinoviev put forth the satirical argument that a new kind of person was indeed created by the Soviet system, but held that this new man - which they call Homo Sovieticus - was in many ways the opposite of the ideal of the New Soviet man.

==== In Chinese communism ====
Similar to the Soviet perspective, the Chinese Communist Party (CCP) emphasized the value of physical labor as a central factor in developing people into new socialist citizens.

From 1942–1944, the CCP instituted the Yan'an Rectification Movement, which sought to eliminate ideological differences among the cadres and intellectuals and to mold them into socialist new men. Following this campaign, the CCP's ideology consolidated around Mao Zedong Thought.

The idea of the Soviet New Man also inspired efforts in the People's Republic of China to develop a citizenry committed to transforming China into a strong and industrialized country. China's promotion of model workers was part of this effort. During the Cultural Revolution, depictions of iron girls became a frequent subject of art, often shown in spaces and engaged in activity traditionally associated with male authority as part of an effort to develop the new socialist woman.

In Deng Xiaoping's speech at the 1979 national congress of China Federation of Literary and Art Circles, he emphasized the role of the arts in developing the new socialist person.

==== In Cuban communism ====
The Cuban state sought to develop the socialist New Man through its voluntarism-focused Revolutionary Offensive campaign. Among the qualities Che Guevara theorized for the New Man, were generosity, indignation against injustice, realism, and being romantic. Efforts from 1986 to 1990 to develop the New Man included efforts to increase moral, as opposed to economic incentives.

Cuba again sought to promote the socialist revolutionary ideals of the New Man during the Battle of Ideas, a political campaign launched by Fidel Castro in 2000 following the popular mobilizations seeking the return of seven year-old Elián González from the United States.

=== Fascist ===
Fascism supports the creation of a New Man who is a strong-willed, dynamic archetype, a figure of direct action and bellicose violence. An anti-individualist, he is characterized by a sense of confidence and masculinity, quiet dignity and self-worth, determination, and authoritativeness. With a detachment from romantic love, family background and schooling, his worldview is romanticized, passionate, serious and realist, preoccupied with the honoring of fallen heroes, a strong belief in personal responsibility, national rebirth and renewal. He regards himself as one component of a disciplined mass that has shorn itself of individualism, party politics, discrimination, and cohesive class orientation in favor of a united, paramilitarist effort. One example of this was the idea of the Political Soldier, which was developed by the leaders of the Official National Front in the UK in the 1980s and became part of the ideology of the Third Position.

=== Liberal ===
Thomas Paine and William Godwin believed that the spread of classical liberalism in France and the United States constituted the birth of a New Man and a new era.

=== Transhumanist ===
Transhumanism welcomes the creation of a literal new man by enhancements through cybernetics and other "human enhancements", and look toward the singularity as the point in time in which the new man arrives. Scholar Klaus Vondung argues that Transhumanism represents the final revolution. Others have made similar observations.

=== Utopian socialist ===
Utopian socialists such as Henri de Saint-Simon, Charles Fourier and Robert Owen saw a future Golden Age led by a New Man who would reconstruct society.

== See also ==
- Confucian Junzi
- Eugenics
  - New eugenics
- Heroic realism
- New Man (gender stereotype)
- New Woman
