= Wang Jinxi =

Chinese model worker (1923–1970)

- 王进喜; Wang Chin-hsi
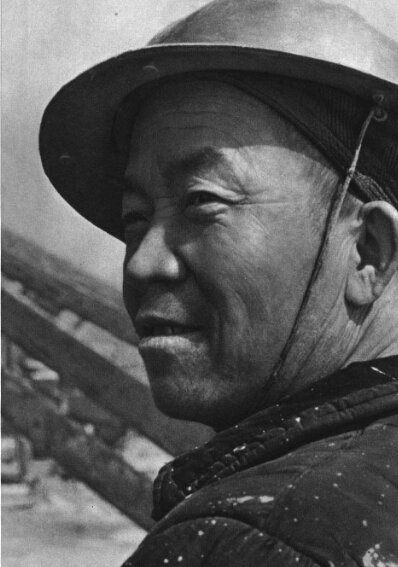
- Wang Jinxi in 1966
- Born: 8 October 1923; Yumen City, Gansu, Republic of China
- Died: 15 November 1970 (aged 47); Beijing, China
- Occupations: roughneck model worker
- Political party: Chinese Communist Party

Wang Jinxi
- Traditional Chinese: 王進喜
- Simplified Chinese: 王进喜
Transcriptions
Standard Mandarin
- Hanyu Pinyin: Wáng Jìnxǐ
- Wade–Giles: Wang^{2} Chin^{4}hsi^{3}

Wang Jinxi or Wang Chin-hsi (simplified Chinese: 王进喜; traditional Chinese: 王進喜; pinyin: Wáng Jìnxǐ; 8 October 1923 – 15 November 1970) was a Chinese oil worker and model worker, known as "Iron Man" Wang, who led the No. 1205 drilling team in the opening of the Daqing Oil Field in 1960. He was presented as the first national role model of China's industrial sector, and his devotion to developing the country's petroleum industry was promoted nationwide.

Wang became deputy commander of the Daqing drilling headquarters, was a deputy to the 3rd National People's Congress, and in 1969 was elected to the Central Committee of the Chinese Communist Party. He was attacked during the Cultural Revolution, and died of stomach cancer in 1970, at the age of 47. His story was revived in later campaigns, notably after the protests of 1989, and he has been the subject of films, a television series and a memorial hall in Daqing.

== Early life ==
Wang Jinxi was born on 8 October 1923 in Chijinbao, Yumen County, Gansu, into a poor peasant family. At the age of six, he begged on the streets with his blind father, and at ten he herded cattle for a landlord. In 1938, at the age of 15, he began work as a labourer at the Yumen Oil Company. According to a 2004 profile by People's Daily Online, he was dismissed after injuring his leg at work and later returned under another person's name. The same profile states that in more than a decade at Yumen, where American experts controlled the drilling techniques, he was never allowed to operate a drilling rig.

== Yumen oil field ==
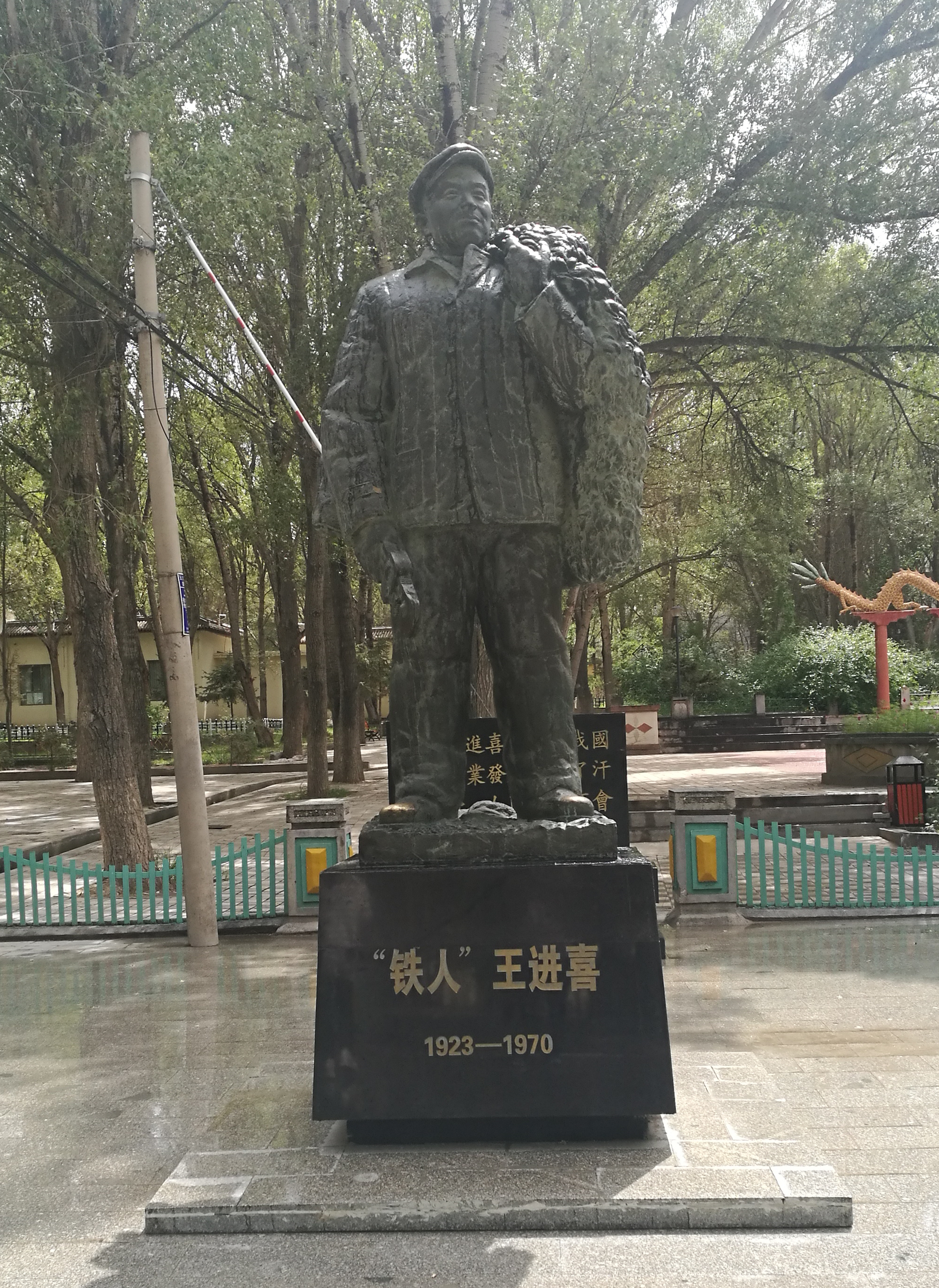
Statue of Wang in Yumen, Gansu

In July 1949, Wang joined a team that protected the oil field from Nationalist forces, helping to hide machinery in the mountains and to patrol at night, and Yumen came under communist control that September. In the spring of 1950, he passed an examination and became one of the first generation of drilling workers in the People's Republic of China. He joined the Chinese Communist Party on 29 April 1956. The same year, he became captain of a drilling team, referred to in different accounts as the Beiwu No. 5 team and as team 1259, which was later renamed the 1205 drilling team. In 1957, during a shortage of imported materials, he had old drill bits cleaned and reused so that drilling could continue.

In July 1958, the Ministry of Petroleum Industry launched a competition for high-speed drilling, and in September his team drilled more than 5,009 metres in a single month, a national record at the time. On 6 October 1958, the ministry named it the "Steel Drilling Team". In 1959, Wang attended the national conference of model workers in Beijing and was named a national model worker. He also attended the celebrations of the tenth anniversary of the People's Republic. In Beijing, he saw buses fitted with gas bags in place of petrol because of the country's fuel shortage, and was moved to tears. He later told colleagues, "The gas bags alerted me to the pressure our country was under."

== Daqing ==
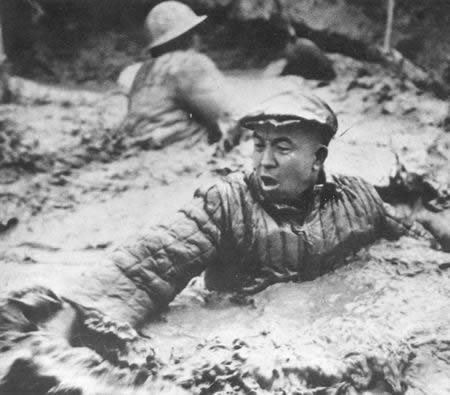
Wang Jinxi blocking the blowout in the mud pool

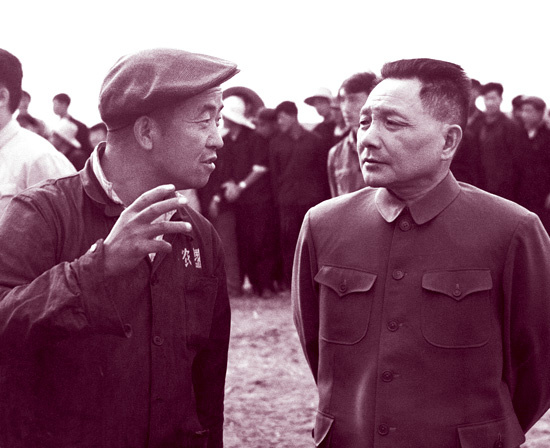
Wang Jinxi (left) with Deng Xiaoping (1961)

Oil was struck in Heilongjiang on 26 September 1959, and the new field was named Daqing to mark the approaching national anniversary. The Songliao petroleum campaign to develop it began in February 1960. Wang volunteered to join the campaign, and before leaving Yumen he knelt and kowtowed to his mother in farewell. On 15 March 1960, he set out with the 37 members of the 1205 team, and on 25 March they arrived at Saertu station in Daqing. Without cranes or enough trucks, the team moved a drilling rig weighing more than 60 tonnes by hand, and raised its derrick in three days and nights using rollers, crowbars and ropes. As the water pipeline was not yet ready, Wang led the workers in breaking the ice on a nearby pond and carrying more than 50 tonnes of water to the well site in basins and buckets. Drilling of the well, Sa-55, began on 14 April, and it was completed on 19 April 1960 at a depth of 1,200 metres, in a record five days and four hours.

On 29 April 1960, Wang's right leg was injured as the team prepared to move to its second well. He returned to work on crutches without staying in hospital. When the second well blew out at a depth of about 700 metres, there was no baryte on site to weight the drilling mud, and Wang decided to add cement instead. Because there was no mixer, he threw away his crutches and jumped into the mud pit to stir it with his body, and his workers followed him. The blowout was brought under control after about three hours, and the strongly alkaline mud left large blisters on his skin.

A landlady, Auntie Zhao, who saw him working at the site day and night, remarked that he was a true "iron man", and the name spread across the oil field and, through the press, across China. He is remembered for his vow that he would rather live twenty years less than fail to take the great oil field. The Shanghai Daily renders his words as:

"I would give up 20 years of life so that China can produce oil on its own land."

He also told his co-workers:

"We have to do everything possible. And we have to make the impossible possible."

The Christian Science Monitor wrote that myth mingled with reality in the party's accounts of him, and The World of Chinese notes that it is difficult to separate hagiography from fact in his story. According to the Monitor, the strike at Daqing ended China's reliance on Soviet oil imports, and by 1963 the field was producing more than half of the country's crude oil.

== Later career ==
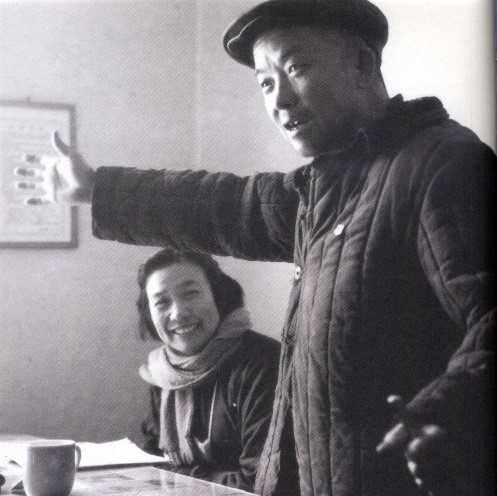
Wang (right) with Sun Weishi, while rehearsing for the play The Rising Sun

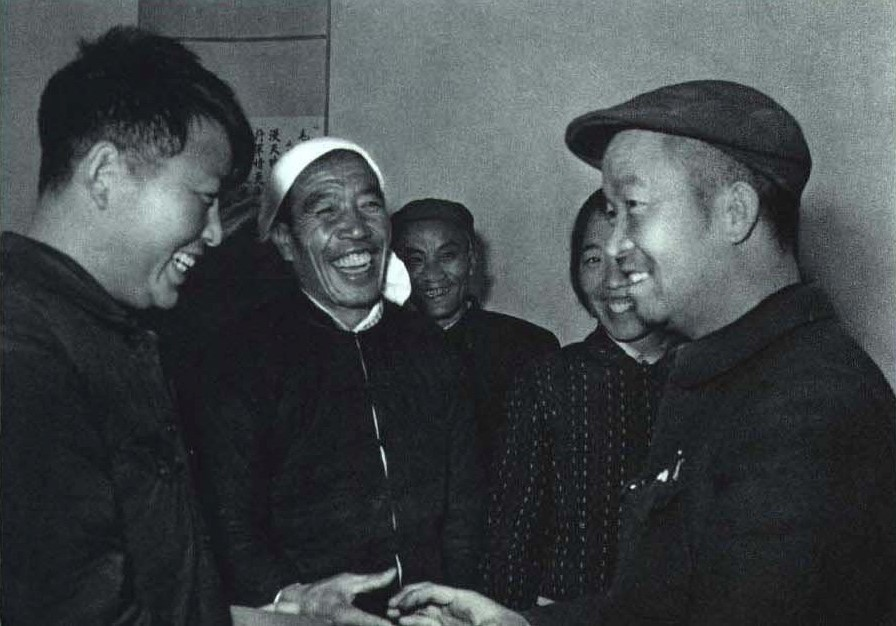
Wang Jinxi (right), during the 3rd National People's Congress (1965)

In 1961, Wang became leader of a drilling brigade, although his injured leg had not fully healed. The oil workers' exploits were depicted in the play The Rising Sun, by Sun Weishi. The plot focused on the contributions that women made in agriculture and the construction of oilfields, and featured a cast made up exclusively of local people.

In 1964, Wang was elected a deputy to the 3rd National People's Congress. On 26 December 1964, at the 71st birthday dinner of Mao Zedong, Mao praised him and called him an "industrial leader". In 1965, he became deputy commander of the oil field's drilling headquarters. In 1966, the State Council appointed him deputy commander of the Daqing Petroleum Campaign Command, and he was named one of the Ministry of Petroleum Industry's "Five Good" models. On 4 June 1966, he was part of a Chinese delegation that visited the People's Republic of Albania. People's Daily Online states that in 1966 the drilling team he led reached an annual footage of 100,000 metres, which it describes as a world record.

== Cultural Revolution ==
Following the start of the Cultural Revolution in 1966, Wang was condemned as a supporter of Liu Shaoqi, and was also criticised for letting his wife, Wang Lanying, wash his feet. On 23 December 1966, Zhang Chunqiao publicly criticised him, questioning his motives and his privileges. According to the 2007 book The Soul of China, as cited by The World of Chinese, he was beaten, branded with a hot iron and pressed to confess, but refused, and he was rescued when Zhou Enlai ordered the army to impose military control at Daqing. The magazine also records him as saying under this pressure, "It doesn't matter whether I am an iron man or a clay man." His former apprentice Xu Wanming recalled that during the Cultural Revolution someone reported Wang to the authorities as a "big foreman".

Wang was vice head of the Daqing Drilling Headquarters, and in 1968 he was appointed vice director of the Daqing Revolutionary Committee. In April 1969, at the 9th Party Congress, he was elected a member of the Central Committee as a representative of the workers.

== Illness and death ==
In April 1970, after attending an oil industry meeting in Yumen and returning to Daqing, Wang was diagnosed with late-stage stomach cancer. He died in Beijing at 11:42 pm on 15 November 1970, at the age of 47.

== Legacy ==
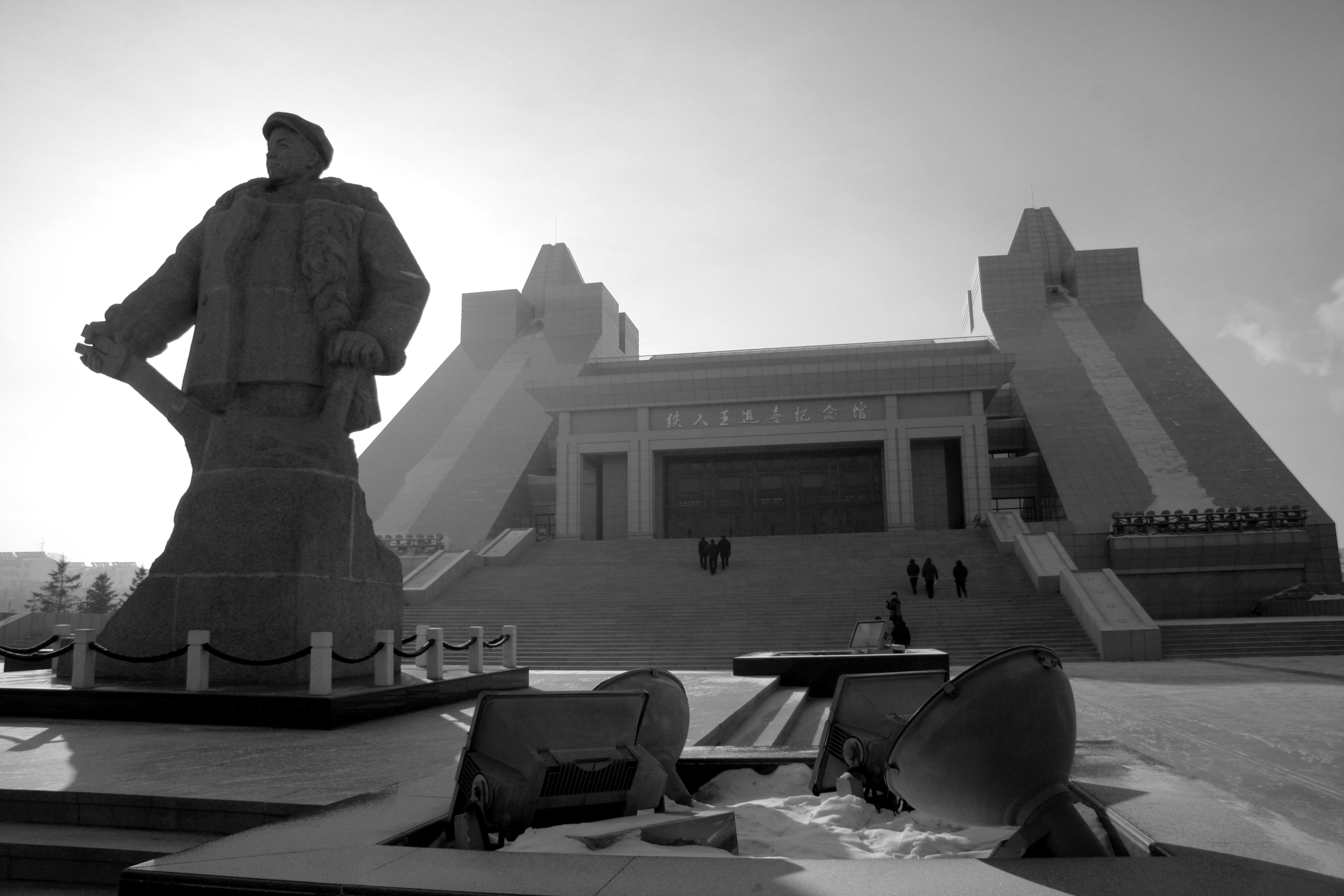
Memorial to Wang in Daqing

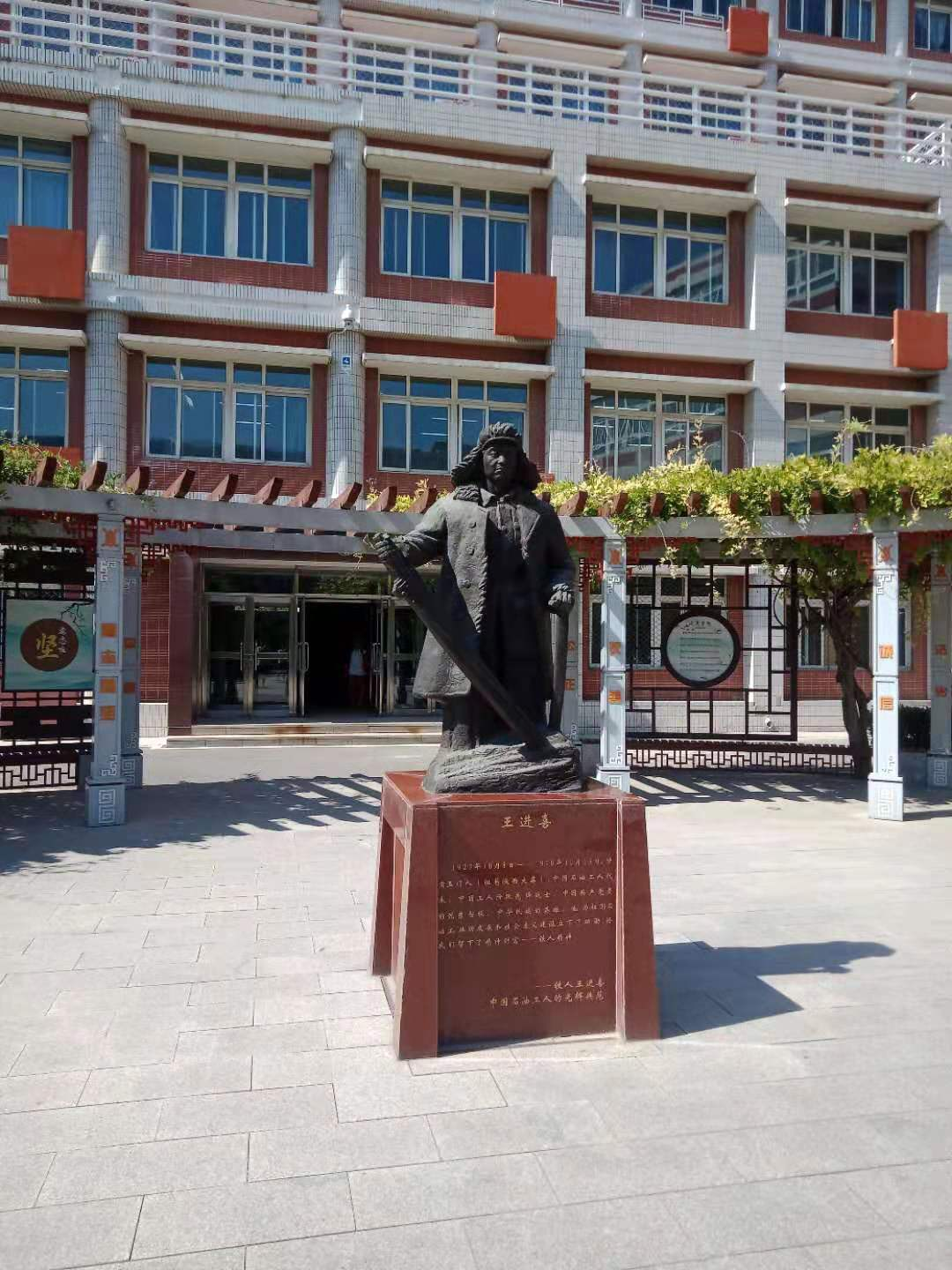
Statue of Wang in Beijing

In 1964, a documentary, Iron Man Wang Jinxi (Tieren Wang Jinxi), produced by China's News and Documentary Studio, urged industrial workers to learn from his leadership and heroism. The Shanghai Daily describes him as the first national role model in the industrial sector.

On 25 February 1990, after the protests of the previous spring, the party's general secretary, Jiang Zemin, visited Daqing and met Wang's widow, Wang Lanying, and their children, as the party launched a campaign to spread the "Iron Man spirit". An eight-part television series about him, directed by Wang Chitao, was broadcast nationally. The Monitor reported that propagandists were reviving him to promote patriotism, socialist zeal and obedience, and quoted the historian Merle Goldman as saying that the leaders were "promoting blind patriotism".

In September 2009, Wang was voted one of the 100 most notable figures in the history of the People's Republic, and the magazine China Comment later selected him as one of the ten most influential figures of the past century. In 2019, he was included in the "Most Beautiful Strivers" series honouring figures in the history of the People's Republic. The Iron Man Wang Jinxi Memorial Hall in Daqing is 47 metres tall, and visitors climb 47 steps to enter it, one for each year of his life. In September 2023, the Daqing oil field marked the centenary of his birth by naming eight of its workers "New Models of the Iron Man Spirit". The 1205 drilling team that he led is still active.

== Representation in media ==
Wang famously wrote in a poem, "If an oil worker roars once, the Earth will shake three times!" The World of Chinese notes that his unpolished poetry suited the party's image of an ordinary worker who had risen through devotion.

In 1974, Wang's life was made into the feature film The Pioneers (Start an Undertaking). Zhang Lianwen played the starring role of Zhou Tingshan, a character modelled on Wang. The 2009 film Iron Man (Tieren) is based on his life, with Wu Gang in the title role. In 2021, the Liaoning Ballet of China created a dance drama, Iron Man, about his life.

== See also ==
- Lei Feng
- Dong Cunrui
- List of campaigns of the Chinese Communist Party
- Zhang Side
