= Liang Jun (tractor driver) =

Chinese tractor driver (1930–2020)

- 梁军
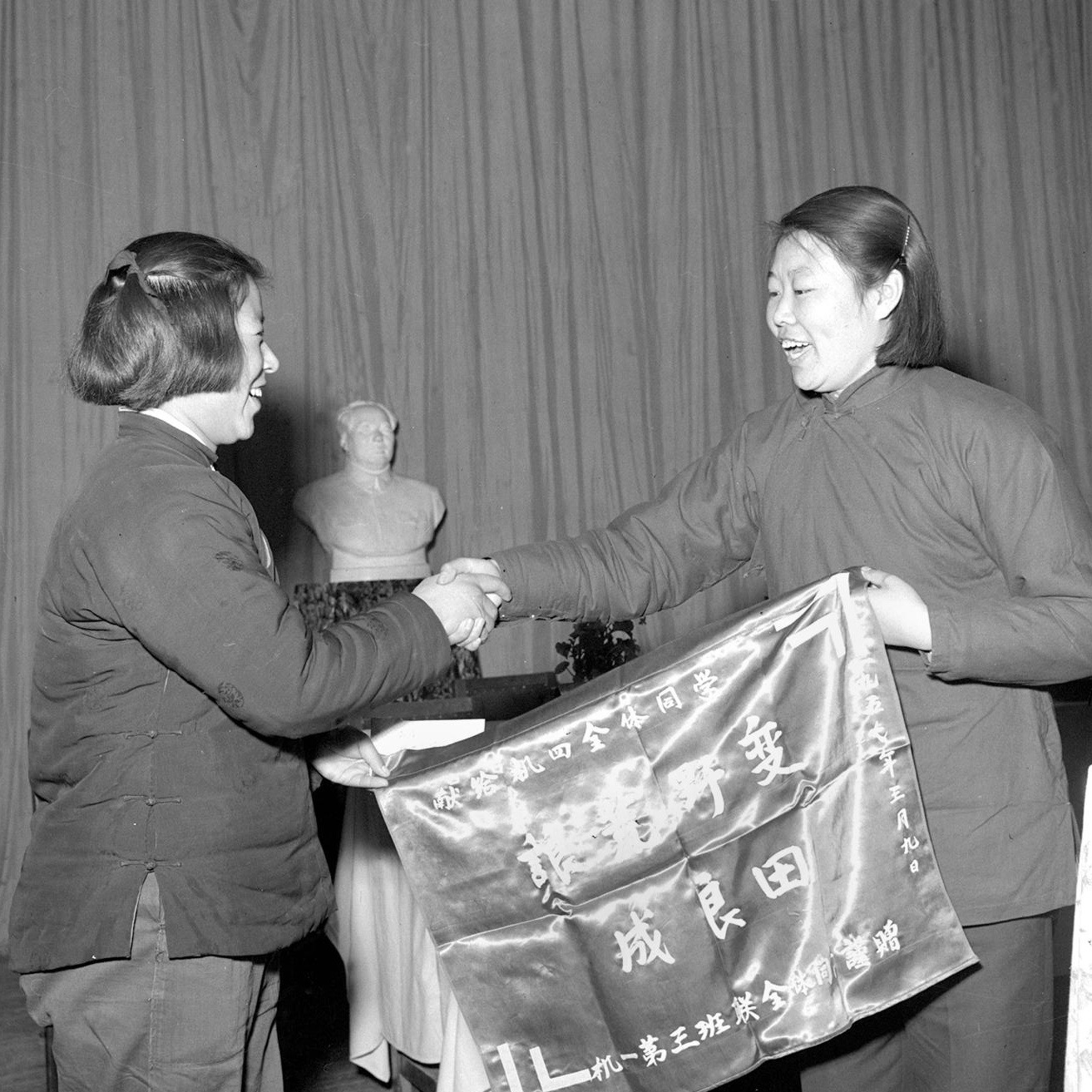
- Liang Jun graduating from the Beijing Agricultural Machinery Academy in 1957
- Born: April 1930; Mingshui County, Heilongjiang, Republic of China
- Died: 14 January 2020 (aged 90); Harbin, Heilongjiang, People's Republic of China
- Known for: China's first female tractor driver
- Political party: Chinese Communist Party

Liang Jun
- Traditional Chinese: 梁軍
- Simplified Chinese: 梁军
Transcriptions
Standard Mandarin
- Hanyu Pinyin: Liáng Jūn
- Wade–Giles: Liang^{2} Chün^{1}
- IPA: [ljǎŋ tɕwə́n]

Liang Jun (Chinese: 梁军; April 1930 – 14 January 2020) was believed to be the first female tractor driver in China who later became a folk hero and model worker. She is depicted on the one yuan banknote of China's third renminbi series. She served as a politician, both provincial and national, and advisor on agricultural matters.

She is celebrated for breaking down class and gender barriers.

== Early life ==
Liang was born in 1930 in Mingshui County, Heilongjiang; her family were peasants and so gave her to a nearby landlord to be a child bride when she was twelve. When Liang was 15, the province was liberated during World War II. As the Chinese Communist Party (CCP) came into power, Liang was allowed to go to school. Tina Mai Chen, a specialist in Chinese history, interviewed Liang in 1996; Chen says that "She took on the idea of getting an education, of also challenging the ideas of her fellow male students and other teachers to show that women could do the work". In 1947, Liang began a work-study program at Mengya teaching school in Dedu County. Here she read books on workers ethics and powerful women, and saw Soviet films (including Heroine, about a Soviet woman who takes on a Nazi army) and exhibitions that depicted female tractor drivers. She chose this occupation, going into further education at a specialist tractor driving school. In 1948, the province began a tractor driving course, and Mengya was given three places for their students; Liang signed up, not knowing she was the only female until it began. The course had 70 students in total.

== Career ==
Chen notes that Liang's dedication "fits into the Socialist project of glorifying the worker". Part of the rise of the People's Republic of China (PRC) involved this, termed by Chen as "celebrating women in particular roles".

Liang is popularly seen as China's first female tractor driver, though this may not entirely be the case: before the PRC promoted Liang as such, other women may have been training to drive tractors in other parts of the country. The PRC promoted the model worker concept by creating a generation of 'first women' in various roles, and "no occupation [was] more promoted than that of the female tractor driver". (Note: The BBC is here quoting the Oxford Handbook of the History of Communism.)

Though she became a folk hero across China because of the image as a first woman, Liang continued to work, and was said to have "devoted her whole life to farm machinery". Her rise to notoriety involved stories spreading across the country that she, a woman, took tractors out to explore the wilderness. Liang's story inspired other women to become tractor drivers, and the first all-female team was formed in 1950, with Liang made its leader. In 1951, the local government funded Liang to receive further training from the newly created Beijing Agricultural Machinery Academy, and the Beijing Agricultural Mechanization College in 1952. Liang returned to her province and began working for the government there, heading up agricultural development programs.

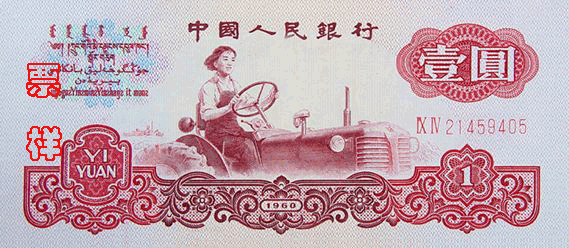
Liang on a yuan banknote

As a folk hero, in December 1949 she was selected as the CCP's delegate for the Asian Women's Conference. In 1957, Liang became one of the agricultural instructors to the explorations into China's northern wilderness. She continued as an instructor for the 1960 expedition. When the first tractor manufacturing plant in China was opened in Harbin in 1959, Liang was involved. In 1962, an image of her driving a tractor became the face of the one yuan banknote. Between 1954 and 1966, Liang was elected to be a member of the National People's Congress on three consecutive occasions. She continued to work in her province's government agricultural sector until she retired in 1990. Her life is included in Chinese primary school textbooks, and films have been made about her.

== Death ==
Liang died on 14 January 2020 at the age of 90 in Harbin. She had been suffering a long illness, with her son reporting that she had died peacefully after putting up "a good fight". In the years before her death, Liang had suffered various illnesses, becoming bedridden.
