= Song Zhenming =

Former Chinese Petroleum Industry Minister

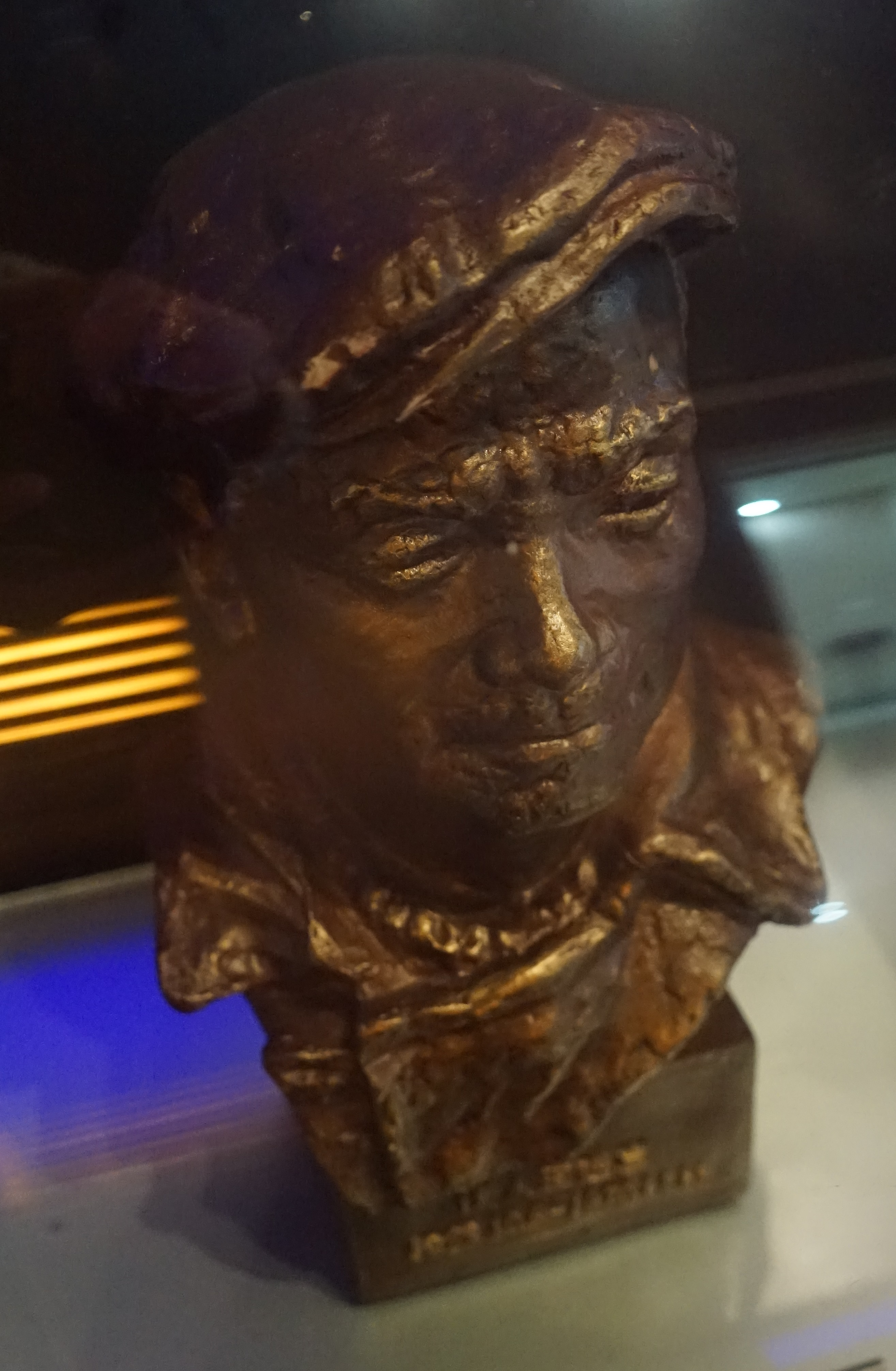
The Iron Man statue placed on the desk of former Chinese Petroleum Minister Song Zhenming during his lifetime. It was later donated to the Ironman Hall by his family. National third-level cultural relics.

Song Zhenming was a Petroleum Industry Minister in the People's Republic of China. He was among the second generation of PRC state energy sector leadership.

== Career ==
During the Cultural Revolution, Song was required to attend a May Seventh Cadre School.

He was removed from office after the collapse of an oil rig in the Bohai sea which killed 72 oil workers in November 1979. Song was accused of falsifying reports in a cover-up during the investigation into the accident. Song wrote a self-criticism which was published in all major Chinese newspapers on 26 August 1980, and was removed from office that day.

As General Manager of China Oil Development Corporation in 1985, Song was involved in the opening of large areas of the Chinese interior for oil exploration by foreign firms.

Song's last wish was for his ashes to be spread around the first oil well at which he had worked.
