= List of European countries by steel production =

The following is a list of European countries by steel production. Figures are from the World Steel Association.

Crude steel production (million tonnes):
Rank	Country/Region	2007	2008	2009	2010	2011	2012	2013	2014
—	World	1,351.3	1326.5	1,219.7	1,413.6	1,490.1	1,547.8	1,650.4	1,670.1
-	European Union (28)	210.2	198.2	139.3	172.8	177.7	169.4	166.4	169.3
5	Russia	72.4	68.5	60.0	66.9	68.7	70.6	69.0	71.5
7	Germany	48.6	45.8	32.7	43.8	44.3	42.7	42.6	42.9
8	Turkey	25.8	26.8	25.3	29.0	34.1	35.9	34.7	34.0
10	Ukraine	42.8	37.3	29.9	33.6	35.3	32.9	32.8	27.2
11	Italy	31.6	30.6	19.7	25.8	28.7	27.2	24.1	23.7
14	France	19.3	17.9	12.8	15.4	15.8	15.6	15.7	16.1
17	Spain	19.0	18.6	14.3	16.3	15.6	13.6	14.3	14.2
18	United Kingdom	14.3	13.5	10.1	9.7	9.5	9.8	11.9	12.1
19	Poland	10.6	9.7	7.2	8.0	8.8	8.4	8.0	8.6
20	Belgium	10.7	10.7	5.6	8.1	8.1	7.4	7.1	7.3
21	Austria	7.6	7.6	5.7	7.2	7.5	7.4	8.0	7.9
23	Netherlands	7.4	6.8	5.2	6.7	6.9	6.9	6.7	7.0
27	Czech Republic	7.1	6.4	4.6	5.2	5.6	5.1	5.2	5.4
31	Slovakia	5.1	4.5	3.7	4.6	4.2	4.4	4.5	4.7
33	Sweden	5.7	5.2	2.8	4.8	4.9	4.3	4.4	4.5
34	Kazakhstan	4.8	4.3	4.1	4.3	4.7	3.9	3.3	3.7
35	Romania	6.3	5.0	2.7	3.9	3.8	3.8	3.0	3.2
36	Finland	4.4	4.4	3.1	4.0	4.0	3.8	3.5	3.8
38	Belarus	2.4	2.6	2.4	2.5	2.6	2.7	2.2	2.5
40	Luxembourg	2.9	2.6	2.2	2.6	2.6	2.2	2.1	2.2
40	Greece	2.6	2.5	2.1	1.8	2.0	1.2	1.0	1.0

== See also ==
- Steel industry
- List of countries by steel production
- Global steel industry trends
- List of steel producers
- List of countries by iron ore production
