= Ilva (company) =

Italian steel company

ILVA S.p.A.
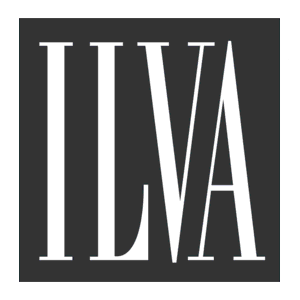
- Formerly: Società Anonima ILVA
- Type: State-owned company
- Industry: Steel
- Predecessor: Taranto steelworks, as asset of Italsider S.p.A (1964)
- Founded: 1905; 121 years ago (as Società Anonima ILVA; 1995 February 8; 31 years ago
- Fate: The Taranto steelworks, part of the ILVA S.p.A. corporate assets, were acquired by the Gruppo Riva in 1995; 31 years ago.
- Successor: Taranto steelworks, as asset of ArcelorMittal Italia S.p.A. (2018–2020)
- Headquarters: Genoa, Italy
- Key people: Oscar Sinigaglia; Agostino Rocca; Giovanni Gambardella; Alessandro Danovi; Francesco di Ciommo; Daniela Savi (Extraordinary Commissioners)
- Products: Flat steel products, stainless steel, alloy steel
- Revenue: $7.7 billion (1989)
- Operating income: $487 million (1989)
- Number of employees: 10000
- Website: https://www.gruppoilvainas.it/

ILVA S.p.A. is an Italian steel company in Taranto, that for much of the 20th century was Italy's largest steel producer and one of the largest in Europe.

== History ==
ILVA was established in 1905 in Genoa and existed through the decline of European steel manufacturing during the 1970s and 1980s until its final privatization in 1995. ILVA main assets, including giant Taranto steelworks, Europe's largest, were acquired by Gruppo Riva. In 2012, Taranto steel plant was at the centre of an environmental scandal, that led to the arrest and conviction of some Riva family members and the transfer of the steelworks to ArcelorMittal.

=== Early history (1905–1934) ===
The company was founded in Genoa on 1 February 1905, its namesake being the Latin name for Elba island, seat of plentiful iron ore deposits that fuelled the first blast furnaces built in Italy in the late 19th century. Ilva was born from the merger of the steel activities of Siderurgica di Savona group, of Acciaierie di Terni and of its subsidiary Ligure Metallurgica. The initial share capital of the limited company was 12 million Italian lire; this was increased to 20 million lire when Elba group joined shortly after. The new company, controlled by Genoese financers, was set up with the political and financial backing of the Italian state, in order to build the Bagnoli steel plant, as part of the 1904 law for the development of Naples, prepared by economist and later prime minister Francesco Saverio Nitti. During the First World War, Ilva benefited from big state contracts, but the end of the war effort and the postwar recession, combined with the effects of the red scare of 1920–1921, brought it close to bankruptcy, and Banca Commerciale Italiana assumed control of the company in 1922.

=== From IRI to italsider (1934–1995) ===
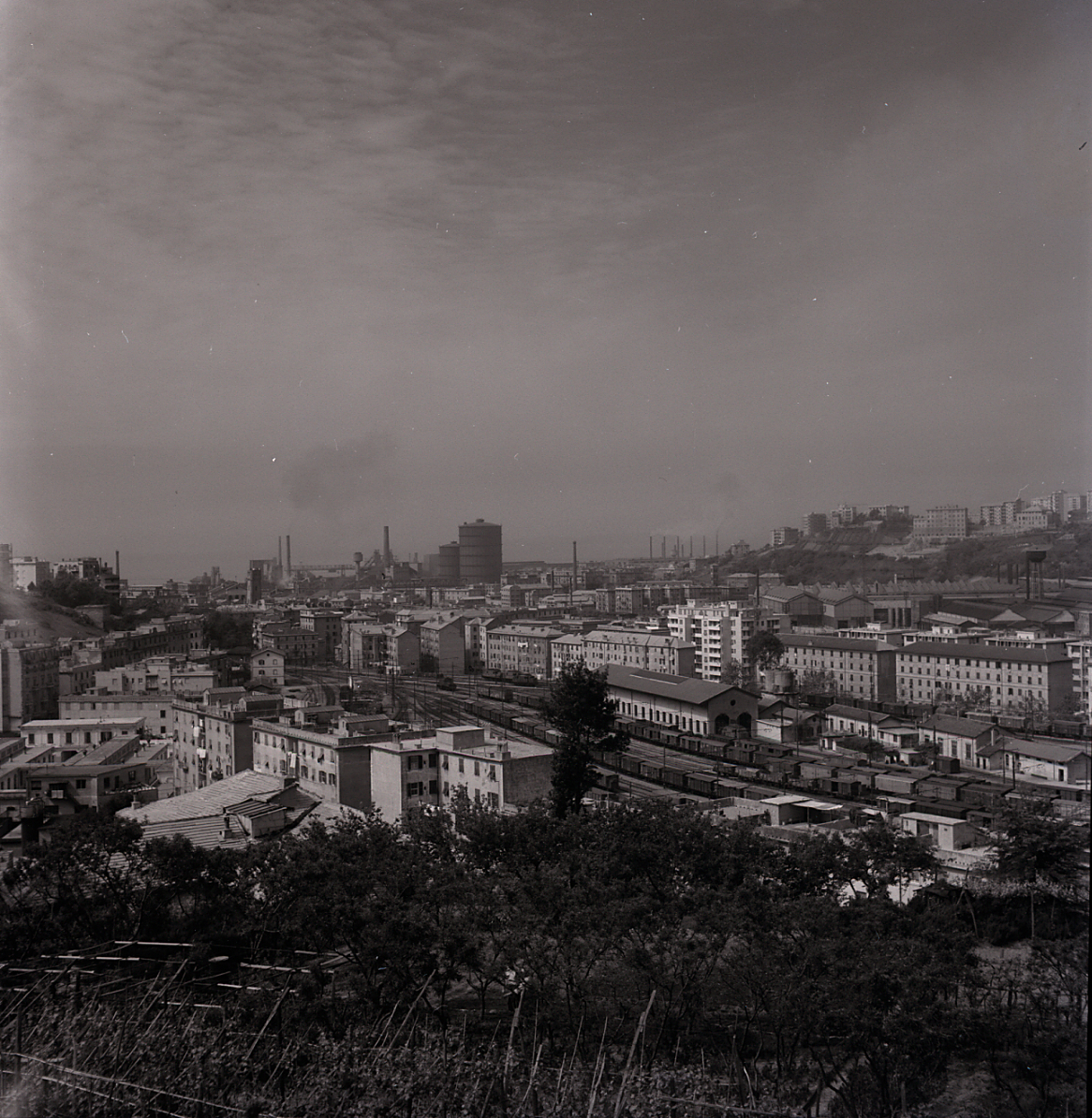
Genoa, Polcevera Valley, view of the Campasso railway park, on the border between the Sampierdarena and Rivarolo (Certosa) neighborhoods. In the background, the Cornigliano steelworks, with the blast furnace at its center, and the Coronata hill in 1965

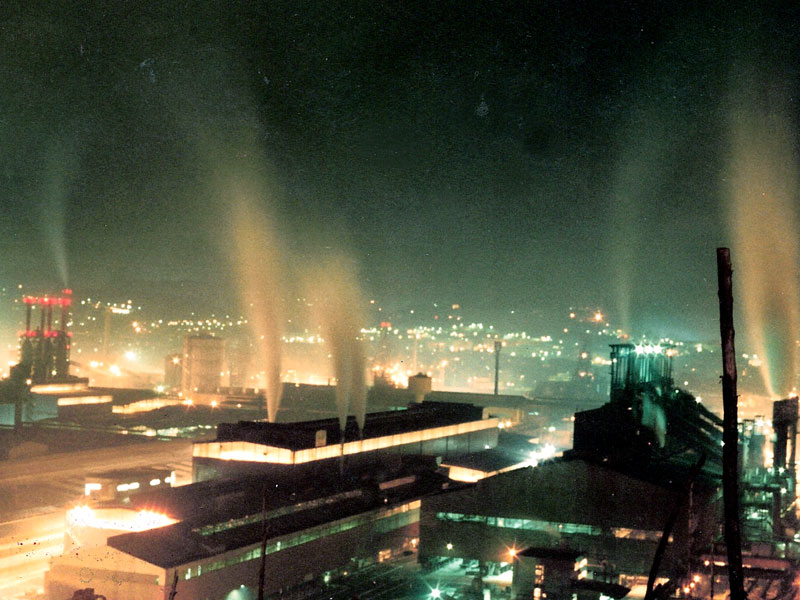
View of the Bagnoli Steelworks at night before its closure in 1992

Ilva continued to struggle during the 1920s, until the 1929 crash dealt a fatal blow to the company, that in 1934 was eventually acquired by IRI, the public holding company established in 1933 by the Fascist regime to rescue, restructure and finance banks and private companies that went bankrupt during the Great Depression. Ilva thus became part of Finsider, IRI's holding specializing in steel production (that controlled also Acciaierie di Cornigliano S.p.A. steelworks, known as SIAC, and many other smaller steel companies, among which Terni Acciai Speciali S.p.A. (it.) and Dalmine S.p.A.). After the Second World War, IRI president Oscar Sinigaglia used Marshall Plan funds to rebuild and modernize SIAC steelworks in Cornigliano and merged them with Ilva in 1961, creating a new company called Italsider.

The new company expanded rapidly in the 1960s. In 1965, giant Taranto integrated iron and steel complex became operational, employing 5,000 workers and adding 10.5 million tons of capacity to Italsider. By the early 1970s, steel production in the EEC was suffering from overcapacity and foreign competition. Italsider made no exception, taking very heavy losses during steel crisis that hit all the Western economies in the late 1970s and especially in the 1980s. In 1984, Italsider sold SIAC to COGEA, a consortium of private steel companies dominated by Falck Group, that in turn resold it to Gruppo Riva in 1988. In 1992, Italsider, in a last attempt to reduce overcapacity and losses, closed Bagnoli steelworks in Naples.

=== Gruppo Riva ownership and environmental scandal at Taranto (1995–2012) ===
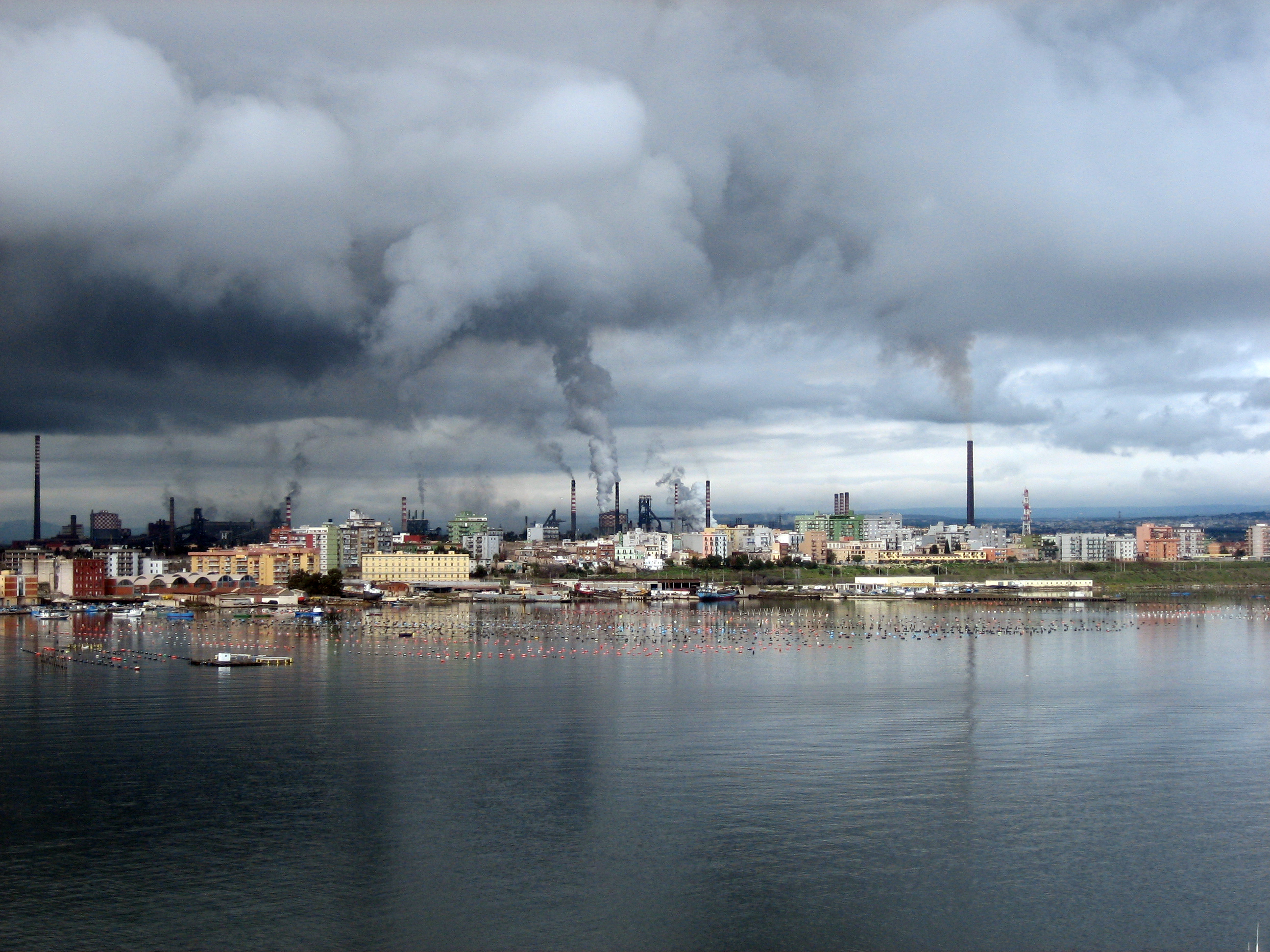
Taranto steelworks in 2007

In 1995, the Italian state decided to get rid of loss-making ILVA and its subsidiaries. Gruppo Riva purchased the Taranto steel plant, the German-based multinational ThyssenKrupp took over Acciai Speciali Terni S.p.A. (AST); Dalmine S.p.A. (steel pipes and tubes) was sold to Tenaris; and other plants were ceded to Gruppo Lucchini. Thus, Gruppo Riva came to own Taranto steelworks in southern Italy, Europe's largest steel plant. During a 2012 inquiry, Taranto steel plant has been found to produce elevated emissions of dioxin, correlated to abnormally high cancer incidence in the area, bringing to the seizure of the plant by the Italian state. According to the European Pollutant Emission Register, emissions of dioxin by Taranto steel plant accounted for 30.6 per cent of all emissions in Italy in 2002, and much more according to an inquiry by PeaceLink NGO.

=== From the commissioners to ArcelorMittal (2012–2018) ===
In 2012, an investigation for environmental crimes and pollution led the Taranto prosecutor to order the seizure without the right to use the plants in the furnace area. To safeguard the establishment and employment, the Italian government initiated the company commissioner procedure and launched an international tender for an assignment of the same. Since January 2015, the company has been under extraordinary administration pursuant to the Marzano Law.

By March 2017, ArcelorMittal was leading a consortium bidding for ILVA. The ArcelorMittal consortium was selected as the preferred bidder over a different consortium led by JSW Steel after it was able to pledge a production increase and guarantee employment levels. The final decision was waiting on Italy's ministry of economic development. In June 2017, the lease was agreed. On 5 June, ArcelorMittal and partners won approval to purchase Ilva for €1.8 billion. The buyers were the AM Investco consortium, which beyond ArcelorMittal included Marcegaglia and Banca Intesa Sanpaolo. In its bid, AM Investco also pledged to make investments into Ilva of €2.4 billion until 2023. The consortium's plan would cut the 14,220 jobs down to under 10,000 by 2018 and would stabilize at 8,500 by 2023. In November 2017, the agreement had yet to be approved by the European Commission competition bureau.

=== ArcelorMittal Italia (2018–2020) ===
ILVA became part of ArcelorMittal Group as of 1 November 2018. The Italian government wanted to hold ArcelorMittal liable for the health impacts of the steel plant. On 5 November 2019, ArcelorMittal announced its intention to withdraw from the transfer agreement, returning it to ILVA, in extraordinary administration, within 30 days. Procedures to shut down the plant were started, then on 18 November interrupted under legal and political pressure.

=== Return to ownership of the Italian state (2020–2021) ===
In 2020, the process of returning to commissioners' management and ownership of the Italian state began under the protection of the penal shield. The implementation of all the modernization procedures and environmental sustainability of the Taranto plant would continue.

=== Acciaierie d'Italia (2021–present) ===
Acciaierie d'Italia S.p.A.
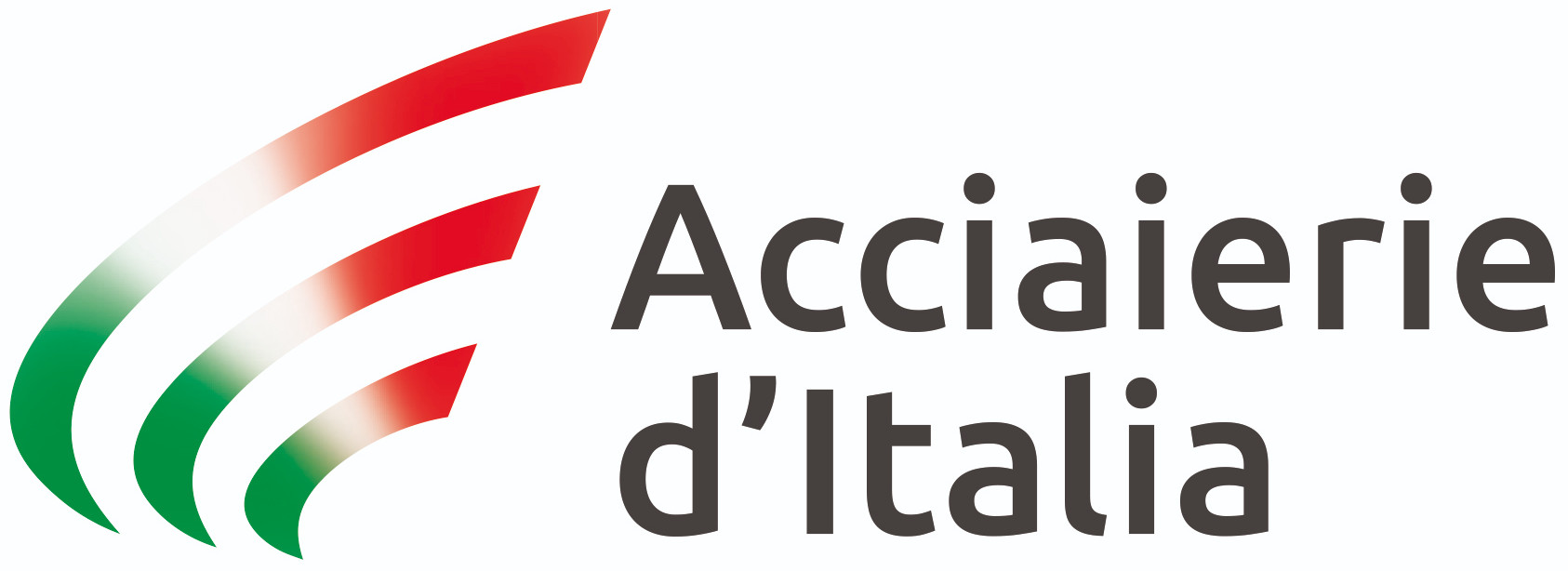
- Formerly: Arcelor Mittal Italia S.p.A.
- Type: State-owned company
- Industry: Steel
- Founded: 2018 May 18; 8 years ago
- Headquarters: Italy
- Key people: Lucia Morselli (former CEO, until February 2024); Giovanni Fiori; Giancarlo Quaranta; Davide Tabarelli (Extraordinary Commissioners)
- Products: Flat steel products, stainless steel, alloy steel
- Website: acciaierieditalia.com

On 23 April 2021, an extraordinary meeting of shareholders approved the change of the company name of Am InvestCo Italy to Acciaierie di Italia Holding. Its subsidiaries also changed names: Arcelor Mittal Italia became Acciaierie d'Italia, Arcelor Mittal Italy Energy became AdI Energia, ArcelorMittal Italy Maritime Services became AdI Servizi Marittimi, ArcelorMittal Italy Tubular became AdI Tubiforma and ArcelorMittal Socova became AdI Socova. It was forecast at the time that, because of scheduled additional investments, the Italian state would control 60% while ArcelorMittal would hold the balance. Instead, Acciaierie d'Italia Holding is held by Invitalia, with a stake of 38%, while the remaining 62% is owned by ArcelorMittal SA.

=== Return of the commissioner management under the control of the Italian state (2024) ===
ArcelorMittal has exhibited behaviors aimed at minimizing investments since the acquisition, a large recourse to the Cassa Integrazione, poor commitment to maintenance activities, delays in paying suppliers, and absence of strategic plans, starting from those relating to the concrete start of a decarbonization project. The real aim of ArcelorMittal was to slowly close the company and cynically eliminate a competitor. ArcelorMittal called several times to answer for these serious failures has had an attitude of total indifference. The company was close to productive and financial collapse with serious repercussions for the safety of workers. In this dramatic situation the government intervened to protect an asset considered strategic and placed it under the control of commissioners. As February 2024, Acciaierie d'Italia is under the commissioners' control of the Italian state. On 18 July 2024, former CEO Lucia Morselli was investigated by the Taranto prosecutor's office on serious charges such as fraud against the state and criminal association, as well as for damages and environmental disaster.

=== Search for a new industrial partner ===
After having restored the company's production activity, having secured workers and plants, and having guaranteed payment to suppliers, already in serious financial difficulty due to the defaults of the previous ArcelorMittal management, the Government has resumed the search for an industrial partner that can support the Italian State in the management and optimization of the plants and the company. As of 10 January 2025, ten offers were received to acquire the company. On 4 February, the company was on track to fully recover production, which is estimated between 3.6 and 4 million tons, and customers, with orders further growing. On 20 March, the sale negotiations are started with Baku Steel.

When the sale procedure seemed to reach finalization with the assignment to Baku Steel on 7 May, a serious fire at the Taranto plant blocked the finalization of the sale procedure. The Taranto plant is seriously damaged and the prosecutor's office seizes the plant for investigations into the accident. The investigation finds serious structural damage to blast furnace 1 of the Taranto plant, such as to compromise production and business continuity. Among the hypotheses being examined by investigators is also that of sabotage to avoid the sale to Baku Steel. Furthermore, the compromised situation of the Taranto plant has led the government to safeguard other company activities excluding the Taranto plant considered beyond recovery.

=== New industrial and environmental development plan ===
On 7 July 2025, Adolfo Urso, the Minister for Business and Made in Italy, called a meeting with the unions and local authorities to outline the future of the plants and the company. The new industrial program calls for the complete decarbonization of the furnace plants, which will be entirely electric. Three are planned to be built in Taranto and one in Genoa. The electric furnaces would be powered by gas from a newly built regasification plant in Gioia Tauro, Calabria. This plan was rejected by Rinaldo Melucci, the mayor of Taranto who first resigned, then withdrew his resignation, and then announced that it would not be signed. He also informed the minister that he would meet with the city council, which he ultimately declined to do. Numerous associations, protesters, and opponents want the agreement to fail and the Taranto plant to be permanently closed. While industrial and economic associations support the new plan. They also fear that this situation of protest and sabotage will discourage investment from both Italian and foreign investors.

On 22 July, Marco Bucci and Silvia Salis, respectively the president of Liguria and mayor of Genoa, held an institutional meeting with Urso to evaluating the development plan, securing the areas for the construction of a new electric furnace. On 30 July, Urso called a meeting at the ministry with Italian steel companies to discuss the construction of new electric furnaces. On 12 August, Urso called a new meeting with all the institutions involved to sign a new industrial and environmental development plan. The agreement for the new development program was signed with all the institutions involved, albeit with great reluctance on the part of the mayor of Taranto. However, the timeframe for the company's acquisition was irreparably extended, leading Baku Steel Company to abandon its acquisition on 11 September 2025. Baku Steel Company's withdrawal was primarily due to the obstructive decisions of the mayor of Taranto. The government guarantees business continuity and has a development fund of approximately 700 million euros, against a projected investment of approximately 9 billion euros for the future buyer, most of which will be earmarked for converting the Taranto plants from hot-fired furnaces to electric, eco-sustainable, and non-polluting furnaces. However, the huge expenditure on Taranto's facilities, combined with the lack of support from the mayor of Taranto and some of the citizens, discourages any private investor, both Italian and foreign. On 16 September 2025, blast furnace 4 was temporarily shut down, the only one currently in operation, while blast furnace 2 is waiting to be re-ignited and blast furnace 1 is under judicial seizure. On 16 September 2025, the company announced an increase in the number of workers on furlough to 4,450, of which 3,803 are in Taranto.

The best option is to build a new electric furnace in Genoa, eco-sustainable and non-polluting with a low environmental impact, powered by gas or renewable energy in the areas formerly occupied by decommissioned hot furnaces, pursuing an efficient business model. This would produce high-quality steel at a reasonable price and with little or no environmental impact. Unfortunately, the Taranto plants would be decommissioned and the Taranto workers would be employed to reclaim the area. The planned private investment would be reduced to €1.6 billion, of which €600 million would be financed by the development fund and €100 million would be allocated to the reclamation of Taranto's decommissioned industrial areas.

On 27 September 2025, the commissioners announced that they had received 10 offers relating to the sale of all or part of the company's assets. Among offers received, two are for all of the company's assets, submitted by Bedrock Industries and the Flacks Group + Steel Business Europe consortium, while the others are for only part of the company's assets. The eight bids for individual assets were submitted by Renexia, Industrie Metalli Cardinale, Marcegaglia, Marcegaglia + Sideralba, CAR s.r.l, Marcegaglia + Profilmec + Eusider, Eusider, and Trans Isole. The commissioners had set aside a period of time to evaluate the offers. On 29 September 2025, the unions avoided a meeting with the Ministry of Labour to resolve the issue of workers' extraordinary redundancy funds. Europa Verde - Alleanza Verdi e Sinistra, far-left political parties, have made a symbolic offer of 2 euros to purchase ILVA, clearly intending to mock the commissioners and the government, whose real political goal is the closure of polluting hot-fired furnaces. On 29 September 2025, the Ministry of Labour announced the closure of the redundancy fund for workers in the absence of unions. On 30 September 2025, Confindustria President Emanuele Orsini met with the unions, reiterating that steel production is crucial to Italy's development and that ILVA represents a strategic asset that employs more than 15,000 people. On 1 October 2025, Unione Sindacale di Base intended to initiate legal proceedings for failure to comply with a 2018 agreement regarding 1,600 workers on furlough. On 1 October 2025, Minister Adolfo Urso reported to the Chamber of Deputies that ILVA's decarbonization is an unavoidable requirement for the offers received, which must be consistent with the signed development plan. On 2 October 2025, unions received assurances of an extension of workers' redundancy payments and an increase in the number of workers on redundancy payments. On 16 October 2025, the unions called a general strike of all ILVA workers with demonstrations and marches and demanded a direct confrontation with the government. On 15 October 2025, the Italian government called the unions to a meeting on 28 October 2025. The general strike was confirmed for 16 October 2025. The number of workers on furlough went from 3,062 to 4,450. On 20 October 2025, the unions fear the company's closure and are calling for its nationalization, as stated by CGIL General Secretary Maurizio Landini. The cost for the nationalization and implementation of the new development plan, entirely borne by the Italian state, would be estimated at around 10 billion euros. On 24 October 2025, the government's meeting with the unions, originally scheduled for 28 October, was postponed to 11 November 2025. On 30 October 2025, company operations continued at the Taranto plants, albeit at a reduced and suboptimal rate, and with workplace accidents. On 31 October 2025, environmental associations in Taranto called a demonstration for 29 November 2025, to demand the closure of the Taranto plants. On 7 November 2025, Minister Adolfo Urso declared that the Italian Constitution does not permit the nationalization of the steel plant. On 10 November 2025, maintenance and safety checks continued at the Taranto plants to prevent accidents like the one that occurred on 7 May 2025. On 11 November 2025, the government convened a meeting with the unions to outline ILVA's future. The tense meeting culminated in the development of a new implementation plan. The plan envisages an increase in the number of staff on furlough from the current 4,550 to approximately 5,700 until 31 December 2025, while from 1 January 2026, they will rise to 6,000 people on furlough. This is to allow the shutdown of hot furnaces and begin building electric furnaces and decarbonized, eco-friendly and eco-sustainable plants according to the previously signed development plan. As of 11 November 2025, according to the unions, the Taranto plant's effective workforce is 7,938 units, including 5,371 workers, 1,704 managers and 863 other employees. On 12 November 2025, after a phase of consultation between the government and the unions, the government outlined an implementation plan for the development plan already signed. This plan will take place over four years, allowing for the reconversion of the plants and the maintenance of production continuity..

=== Four-year implementation plan and new stakeholders involved (2026–2030) ===
On 12 November 2025, the unions do not trust the implementation plan proposed by the government and fear the closure of the company. Confindustria Taranto requests clarity on the financial resources included in the implementation plan. The government outlines the main points of the implementation plan. A new phase of consultation between the government and the unions followed, and the government called the unions back for a new meeting on 18 November 2025.The meeting between the government and the unions took place as scheduled, but after four hours of discussions, the unions expressed distrust of the proposed implementation plan and called a general strike. What did not convince the unions was the number of workers on furlough, which they deemed excessive. Meanwhile, the government intervened, clarifying that no further extension of the furlough program is planned and that the proposed training will help employees acquire the skills needed to process steel using low-impact technologies, as required by the previously signed development plan. On 19 November 2025, a general strike was called in the factories, with occupation and demonstrations, in Genoa several roads towards Sestri Ponente were blocked, causing serious inconvenience to citizens. The road blockade remained in place until the following day. On November 20, 2025, Minister Adolfo Urso called a new urgent meeting for 28 November 2025, with all interested institutional bodies and trade unions. But the meeting held on 28 November 2025, according to the unions, was inconclusive, especially for the Taranto plant. Production continued in Genoa and Novi Ligure, while production in Racconigi was stopped. The unions pushed for nationalization of company. On 30 December 2025, The Flacks Group has reached an agreement with the Italian government for the acquisition of the Ilva steelworks at Taranto in Puglia.

=== Judicial intervention and the decision of the Court of Cassation (2026–2027) ===
In January 2026, while the Italian government, through a specific decree-law, was preparing to implement the planned strategy, providing assurance on business continuity, on 12 January 2026, a worker at Steel Plant 2 in the Taranto facility died, and the unions immediately called for 24 hours of strike. The following day, Steel Plant 2 in Taranto presented safety issues regarding gas leaks, which were promptly resolved. Steel Plant 2 remained under maintenance awaiting to return to operation. The extraordinary commissioners of Acciaierie d'Italia, Giovanni Fiori, Giancarlo Quaranta and Davide Tabarelli, have initiated legal action seeking 7 billion euros in damages against the executives and ArcelorMittal for the material, economic, and financial collapse of Acciaierie d'Italia S.p.A. On 26 February 2026, the civil court of Milan, at the request of the residents of the Municipality of Taranto, ordered the suspension, starting from 24 August 2026, of the production activities of the furnaces at the Taranto steel plant. The following day, Minister Urso had expressed strong concern about business continuity.

=== Unsustainable High Debt ===
As of June 30, 2026, Acciaierie d'Italia S.p.A.'s total debt, as reported in the balance sheet, amounts to €8.481 billion. The largest component is represented by insolvency debt, amounting to approximately €5.495 billion. Debts to suppliers amount to 1.750 billion, while financial debts amount to 1.142 billion; there are also other debts totaling 93.8 million. A high level of debt, already incurred under ArcelorMittal’s management, which expanded further during the administration by the government-appointed commissioners as they sought to address the serious failures and mismanagement of the preceding ArcelorMittal administration. Rather than producing steel, Acciaierie d'Italia S.p.A. has generated a high, unsustainable level of debt. As of September 30, 2026, the amounts past due and unpaid by Acciaierie d'Italia S.p.A. for gas consumption total approximately 1.1 billion euros, as reported by Autorità di Regolazione per Energia Reti e Ambiente (ARERA) to the Italian Parliament and Government.

== See also ==
- Steel industry in Italy
- List of steel producers
- List of countries by steel production
- List of tallest structures in Italy
