= Riva Group =

Italian steel producer

- Type: Private
- Industry: Steel
- Founded: 1954
- Founder: Adriano and Emilio Riva
- Headquarters: Milan, Italy
- Key people: Claudio Riva, Chairman
- Products: Hot rolled flat steel Bars; Iron rod Slabs
- Revenue: €4.37 billion (2021)
- Number of employees: approximately 5,500 (2021)
- Website: www.rivagroup.com

Riva Group is a major Italian steel producer. Riva is a privately held company, the whole shareholders' equity being held by the Riva family. As of 2022, it ranks 69th in the global ranking of steel producers compiled by the World Steel Association. Riva is the leading European producer of electric arc furnace steel, hence producing based on the reuse of ferrous scrap, following a circular economy approach and with low CO_{2} emissions.

== History ==
Riva Group was founded in 1954 in Milan by Adriano and Emilio Riva as an iron scrap trading business. In 1957, the first mini-mill was built in Caronno Pertusella near Milan. A few years later, this plant became the first steelworks in Italy to use continuous casting, in partnership with steel plant engineer Danieli. In the 1960s, Riva expanded in Italy by purchasing smaller rivals. Since the installation of the first continuous casting machine in 1964, it has consistently invested in technological innovation to produce steel using electric arc furnaces, starting from ferrous scrap. This approach is aligned with circular economy principles and aims at reducing CO_{2} emissions, emphasizing the infinite recyclability of steel. In this regard, in 2022, the Riva Group acquired eight collection and crushing sites for ferrous materials, establishing the Trentetrois company.

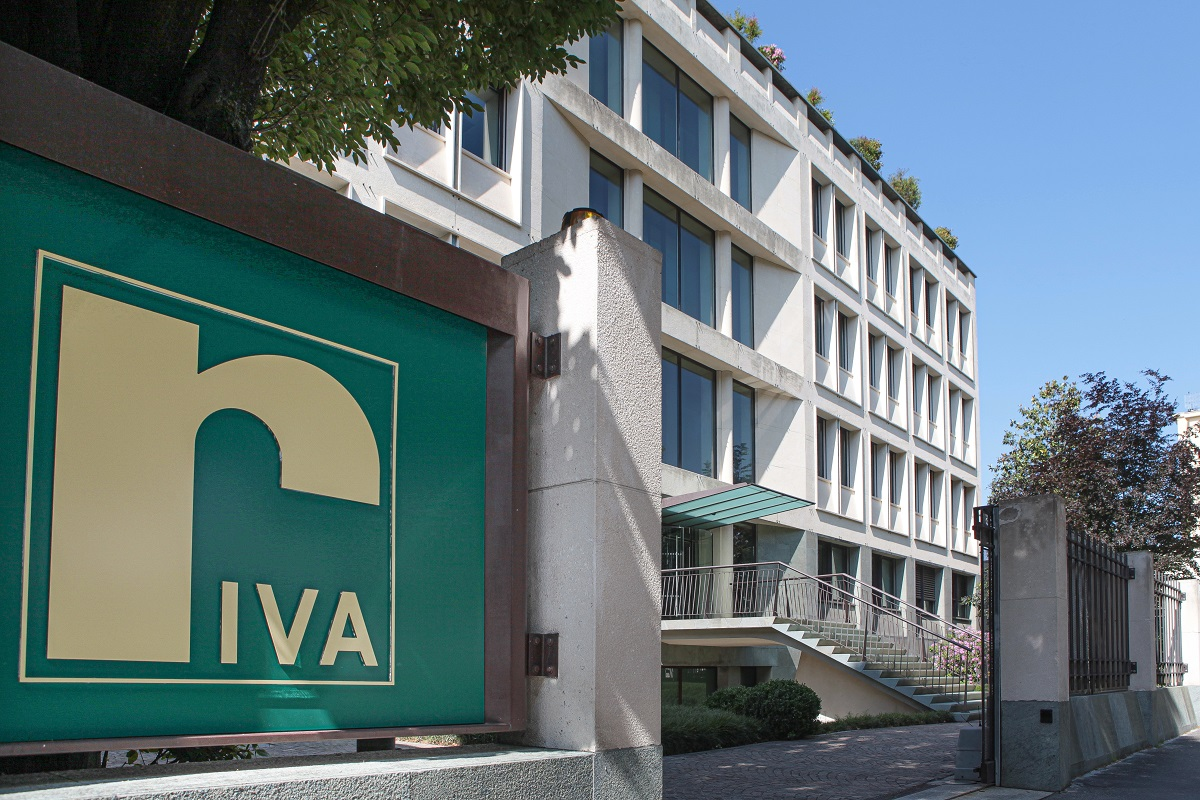
Headquarters of the Riva Group in Milan

Starting from the 1970s, Riva took part in the privatization process of the ailing European steel industry by making further acquisitions in European countries such as

- a minority share (1971), and then full control (1978) of Siderúrgica Sevillana in Spain,
- the establishment of Associated Steel Industries (ASI) in Montreal, Canada,
- a minority share (1976), then management and finally full control (1997) of the Iton Seine steelworks in France,
- the previously state-owned steelworks Acciaierie di Cornigliano in Genoa,
- the Thy-Marcinelle plant in Charleroi, Belgium,
- the Alpa plant in Gargenville, France,
- in 1992, it acquired directly from the German Treuhandanstalt two important plants (Brandenburger Elektrostahlwerke and Henningsdorfer Elektrostahlwerke) in the former German Democratic Republic.

In 1995, Riva Group purchased the ILVA plant in Taranto from the Italian government, becoming one of the main European steel producers. It is also actively engaged in research and development, particularly focusing on technological innovation. Since the 1990s, it established a research and development laboratory at the plant in Lesegno (Cuneo, Italy), equipped with high-tech apparatus. Among them, the Gleeble 3800 thermomechanical simulator stands out as the only one of its kind in Italy. This simulator is utilized to replicate the entire steel processing cycle on tailor-made specimens. From a technological and production standpoint, this enables the conduct of thermal, chemical, and mechanical analyses and tests on various metal types. It replicates on samples weighing just a few hundred grams what is subsequently achieved on a large scale (hundreds and thousands of tons).

On March 8, 2006, the Court of Cassation convicted Emilio Riva to 18 months granting conditional leniency, with regard to events occurred from December 1997 to November 1998 related to an attempted illegal coercion of some ILVA employees which Emilio Riva had been charged with others. On June 16, 2010, the Court of Cassation declared the extinction because of the statute of limitations of all the violations which Emilio Riva, among others, had been charged with, as to the events occurred from July 2000 to September 2002 related to the supposed violation of anti-pollution regulations in the management of the Ilva factory of Taranto.

On January 19, 2009, the Court of Appeal of Genoa declared null and void the first instance's verdict related to the charge of pollution and declared the extinction because of the statute of limitations of the other minor charges which Emilio Riva and two of his sons had been charged with in the management of the ILVA factory of Genoa, with regard to events occurred from 1995 to 2002 related to the violation of anti-pollution regulations.

On February 2, 2012, a report by Istituto Superiore di Sanità revealed extreme levels of air pollution and an abnormal incidence of cancer and cardiovascular diseases around the city of Taranto, where the ILVA giant steelworks are located. Following the report, Emilio Riva and his son Nicola, along with Taranto plant top managers, were arrested for allegedly causing an environmental disaster, and the plant was seized. However, the resulting Ambiente Svenduto (Italian for "environment undersold") trial has been mostly inconclusive. Emilio Riva died in 2014, aged 87, while his brother Adriano Riva, that succeeded Emilio at the top of the family business after the scandal, died in 2019, aged 88, after having reached a €1.3 billion settlement with the Italian state. On 24 April 2018, another son of founder Emilio, Fabio Riva ex-deputy of Riva Group, was convicted for fraud and sentenced to 6 years and 3 months in jail. In May 2018 the Italian state, which had escheated ILVA due to the incidents, now sold the Taranto plant to ArcelorMittal for 1.8 billion. Also included in the transaction were the Genoa steelworks and the Novi Ligure steelworks.

In July 2019, the Milan Court issued a verdict of acquittal, stating that the alleged offense did not exist, in a case initiated by the Milan Public Prosecutor’s Office regarding the bankruptcy accusations against ILVA and its controlling entity, RIVA Fire. The Milan Court explicitly excluded any responsibility of the Riva family in the management of the Taranto plant, asserting that “between 1995 and 2012, in the management of ILVA Taranto by the Riva family, the company made investments ‘in environmental matters’ for ‘over one billion euros’ and ‘over three billion euros for the modernization and construction of new plants’”. The Milan Court also refuted the “claimed general depletion of the structure”, emphasizing that under the Riva Group’s management, the company achieved performance and results positioning it “at the top of the European steel market”. It further stated that only the court-appointed administration prevented the owning Riva Group from continuing the adjustments to the new environmental regulations published in March 2013 and the industrial relaunch of ILVA after the hiatus imposed in 2012 by the judges of Taranto.

On 31 May 2021, the former owners of the Ilva steelworks, Fabio and Nicola Riva, were sentenced to 22 and 20 years in jail respectively for allowing it to spew out deadly pollution. Several other people were also sentenced, including former President of Apulia Nichi Vendola to 3.5 years in prison.

== Corporate organization ==
At the helm of the Riva Group is Riva Forni Elettrici, headquartered in Milan, which directly oversees Riva Acciaio. Riva Acciaio operates in Italy with five facilities located in Caronno Pertusella (VA), Lesegno (CN), Sellero, Malegno, and Cerveno in Valle Camonica (BS). In addition to its Italian plants, the Group extends its presence across Europe with an additional twenty-three units spanning Germany, France, Spain, and Belgium. Moreover, the Group has a facility in Canada.

=== Production in 2022 ===
The Group’s core production revolves around steel and its derivatives. In 2022, the Group achieved a raw steel production of 5.70 million tons.

== Awards ==
Due to the important role played in the privatization of the European steel industry, Emilio Riva was awarded the Grand Cross of Merit by the King of Belgium (2000), the Grand Cross of Merit of the Federal Republic of Germany (2002) and the French Legion of Honour (2005). Étienne Davignon, former European Commissioner and Vice-president of the European Commission, has defined Emilio Riva as “prophet of this dynamic and optimistic vision of private enterprise”, affirming that “steelmaking is not an industry like the others, and the Riva Group is not an industrial group like the others”. In September 2021, the Riva Group facilities in Valle Camonica were honored with the Safety Award for the year 2020/2021. This recognition was conferred by the Italian Metallurgy Association, acknowledging the interventions made in the field of health and workplace safety.

== See also ==
- List of steel producers
- Ilva (company)
- Thy-Marcinelle, Belgian subsidiary
- History of the Riva Group since 1954
- Official web site Ilva Taranto plant
- Official web site School project Ilva Taranto
- Official web site Centro Studi Ilva Taranto
