= Società Italiana Acciaierie Cornigliano =

Italian steelworks company

Società Italiana Acciaierie Cornigliano (SIAC)
- Industry: Steel industry
- Founded: 1934 in Genoa, Liguria, Italy
- Fate: 1967 the company was incorporated into Italsider.
- Headquarters: Italy
- Key people: Oscar Sinigaglia; Agostino Rocca
- Products: Steel
- Owner: Italian government

Società Italiana Acciaierie Cornigliano (SIAC) was an Italian steelworks company.

== History ==
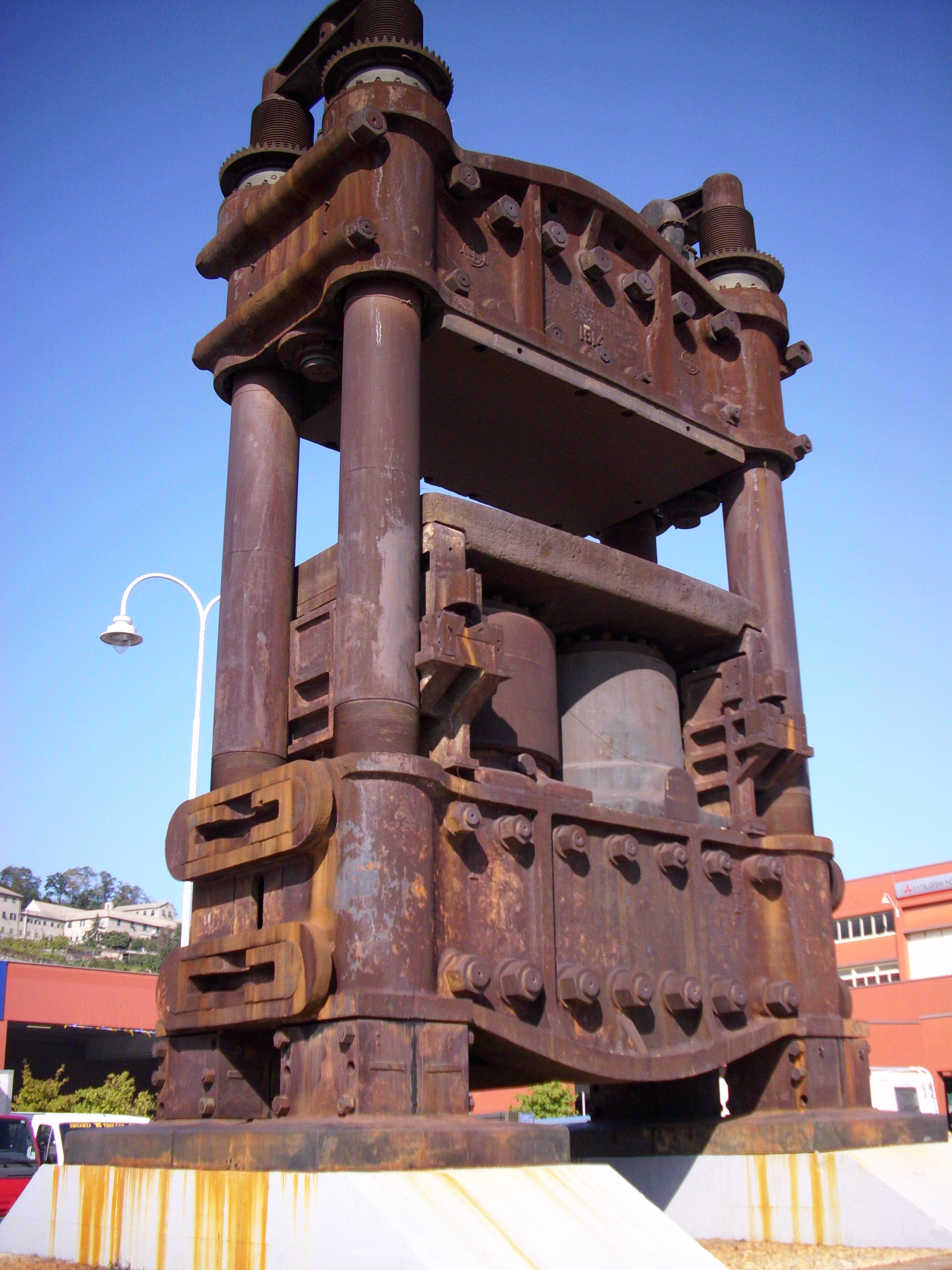
The 15000 tons forging press before the restoration in 2011 in the Ansaldo-SIAC factory in Campi.

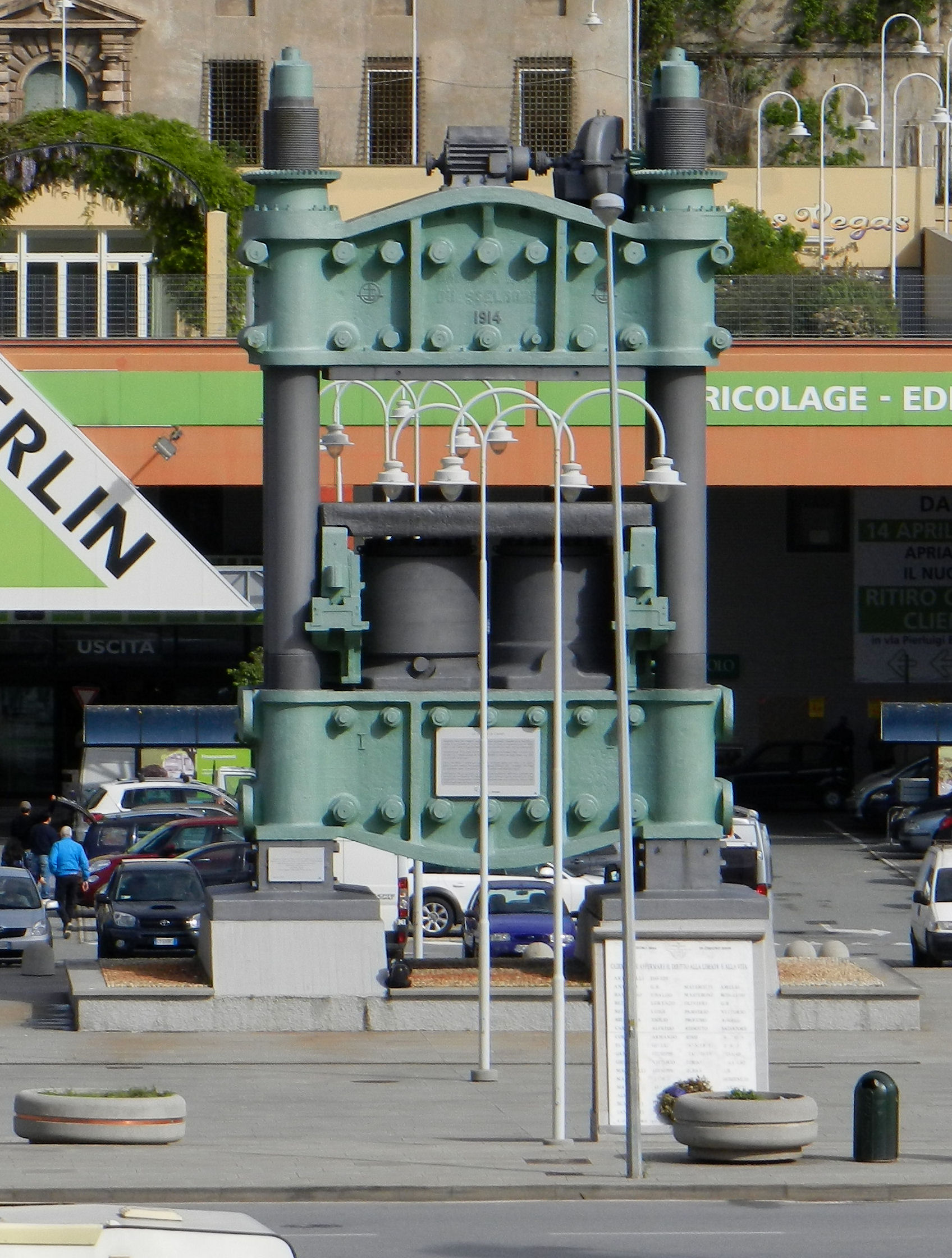
The 15000 tons forging press after the restoration in the Ansaldo-SIAC factory in Campi.

It was established in 1934 to group the Ansaldo steelworks - started up in 1898 and centered on the Genoa Campi plant.

In the same year the company passed under the control of the Istituto per la Ricostruzione Industriale (IRI).

In 1938 the entire stock package was held by Finsider.

In 1939 the SIAC started the construction of the Genoa Cornigliano plant that, after the destruction of the Second World War, was dedicated to Oscar Sinigaglia.

In 1951 the SIAC entrusted the reconstruction and expansion of the Oscar Sinigaglia plant to Cornigliano Società per Costruzione Impianti Industriali (founded by Finsider in 1948), which will take over the name of Cornigliano S.p.A.

On April 14, 1951, for expanding the plant, the Castle Raggio was demolished, which was already heavily damaged by the bombings of the Second World War.

In 1961, the SIAC merged with ILVA - Alti Forni e Acciaierie d'Italia and the new company took the company name of Italsider - Alti Forni e Acciaierie Riunite ILVA e Cornigliano. In 1964 the company was renamed simply Italsider S.p.A.

== See also ==
- Steel industry in Italy
- ILVA
