= Synagogue of Senigallia =

Synagogue in Italy

- Sinagoga di Senigallia
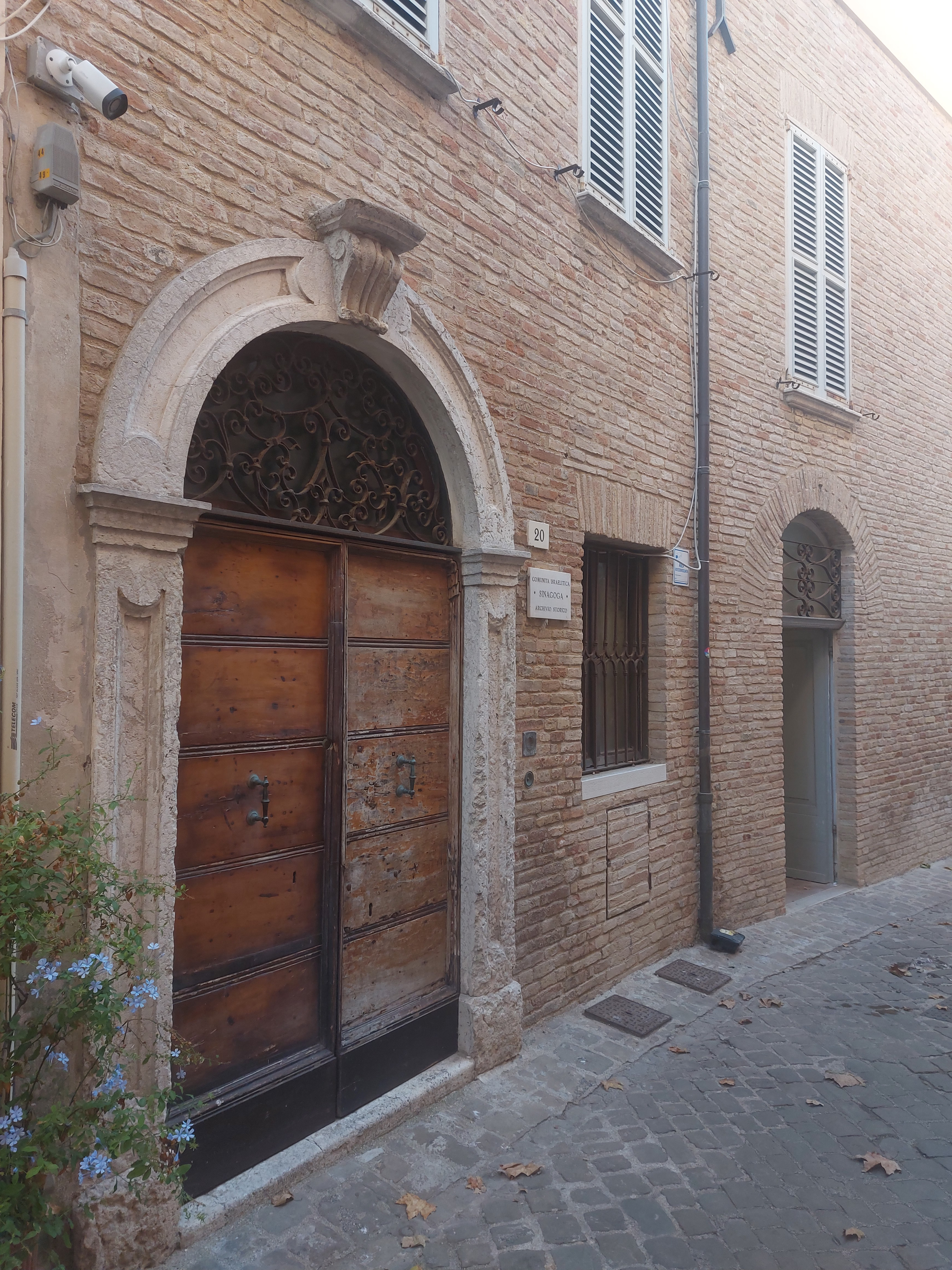
- Synagogue entrance

Religion
- Affiliation: Judaism
- Rite: Italian rite

Location
- Location: Via dei Commercianti 20, Senigallia, Italy
- Interactive map of Synagogue of Senigallia
- Coordinates: 43.715152°N 13.218808°E

Architecture
- Creator: Senigaglia family
- Completed: 1634

The Synagogue of Senigallia (Italian: Sinagoga di Senigallia) is a synagogue located in Senigallia, Italy. It has historically worshipped in the Italian rite, but draws some influence from German and Levantine rites due to interactions with other Jewish communities.

== History ==
The synagogue began construction in 1634, a year after the establishment of the Jewish ghetto in the city. The old synagogue on Via Arsili (then Via della Sinagoga) was abandoned, as it was not included in the newly-defined zone of Jewish habitation. In the early 1640s, the congregation was an early Jewish adapter of art music for choral purposes in the synagogue, which was hotly contested at the time. The synagogue was defended in its use of said music by Rabbi Nethanel Trabot of Modena, and was opposed by many on grounds of its Kedusha during services.

The building designed had three floors, and the shul occupied the top two floors. Following the 1930 Senigallia earthquake, the stability of the building came under threat and the shul was moved to the bottom two floors. The walled-up windows from the original layout are still visible from the women's section.

The synagogue was looted by Sanfedismists during the Italian and Swiss expedition of 1799, destroying the furnishings dating to that century, along with further violence against Jews in their ghetto. The interior was rebuilt in the early 1800s, but was damaged during the 1930 earthquake.

The local Jewish population, which has significantly declined in the last century, has caused problems for the local synagogue. It is not entirely abandoned, but has experienced maintenance issues associated with dwindling use and upkeep. It was announced by the European Economic Community that funds would be allocated for its restoration.

== Description ==
After the entrance to the building, the main section and women's section are separated through two different doors. The shul is rectangular and is illuminated by four large windows embedded in the entrance wall, surmounted by 19th-century valances.

The right side of the building (facing towards Jerusalem) holds the Torah ark, which is painted white and has gold friezes, surmounted by a dome. The left wall has a bema made of wood with similar golden friezes, a lecturn, and Sabbath candles. The lower part of the walls are covered with wooden panelling, acting as backrests for the pews. The center of the room has a long table with two rows of desks.

== See also ==
- List of synagogues in Italy
