= Senigaglia family =

Italian Jewish family

The Senigaglia family (sometimes spelt Sinigaglia) is an Italian Jewish family, whose origins can be traced back nearly 800 years, the period between the High Middle Age and the Renaissance.

Daniel and Isac da Senigallia, bankers at la Volta Mantovana, moved to Mantua.

They restarted their banking activities and built a house, a school and a synagogue. In 1656 they sold everything to the Almansi family.

Another branch of the family lived in Lugo: they became rich merchants and goldsmiths, and changed their name to Sinigaglia

A third branch established themselves in Gorizia a small town 40 kilometres north of Trieste

== Crests ==
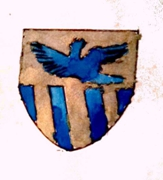
Lugo branch crest. a blue eagle flying in a silver background

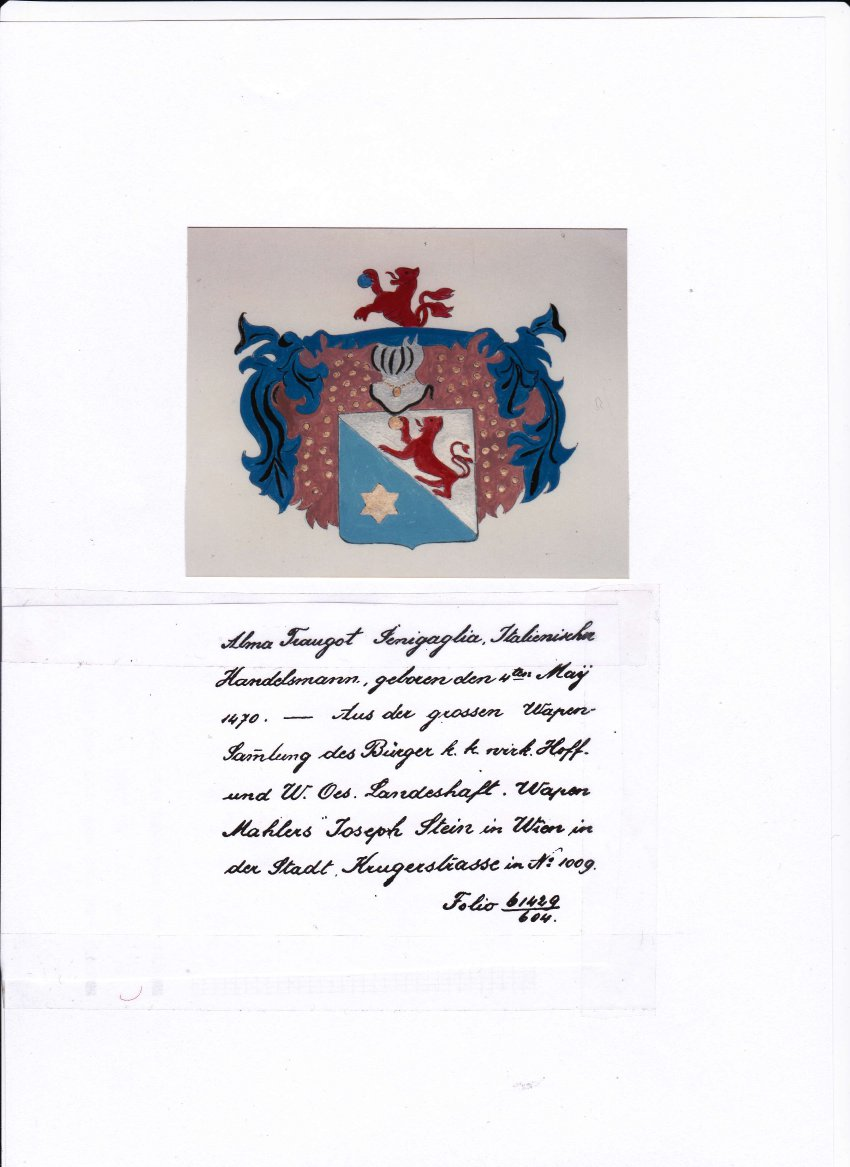
Gorizia branch crest.The golden coins seen on the red part of the crest are a family legend: they would have been lent to Napoleon, and never returned. In exchange of the loan, the Emperor would have granted the right of displaying the gold on the crest for as long as the loan was not paid back

Two family crests are known:

== Notable individuals ==
- Oscar Sinigaglia, founder of the Italian steel industry
- Leone Sinigaglia, Italian composer

== See also ==
- History of the Jews in Italy
