= List of countries by steel production =

Steel production

In 2023, total world crude steel production was nearly 1.9 billion tons (Gt). The biggest steel producing country is currently China, which accounted for 54% of world steel production in 2023. In 2020, despite the COVID-19 pandemic, China became the first country to produce over one billion tons of steel. In 2008, 2009, 2015 and 2016 output fell in the majority of steel-producing countries as a result of the global recession. In 2010 and 2017, it started to rise again. Crude steel production contracted in all regions in 2019 except in Asia and the Middle East. India is the 2nd leading producer of iron and steel industries.

== Steel production ==
=== 2015–2025 ===
This is a list of countries by steel production from 2015 to 2025, based on data provided by the World Steel Association. All countries with annual production of crude steel at least 1 million metric tons.

Crude steel production in 2015–2025 (million metric tons)
Country/Region	2025	2024	2023	2022	2021	2020	2019	2018	2017	2016	2015
World	1,849.4	1,886.3	1,904.1	1,889.2	1,962.5	1,883.3	1,874.4	1,808.4	1,674.8	1,606.3	1,620.4
China	960.8	1,005.1	1,028.9	1,018.0	1,035.2	1,064.8	995.4	920.0	831.7	786.9	803.8
India	164.9	149.4	140.8	125.3	118.2	100.3	111.4	109.3	101.5	95.5	89.6
United States	82.0	79.5	81.4	80.5	85.8	72.7	87.8	86.6	81.6	78.5	78.9
Japan	80.7	84.0	87.0	89.2	96.3	83.2	99.3	104.3	104.7	104.8	105.2
Russia	67.8	71.0	76.0	71.5	77.0	71.6	71.7	72.0	71.3	70.5	71.1
South Korea	61.9	63.6	66.7	65.8	70.4	67.1	71.4	72.5	71.1	68.6	69.7
Turkey	38.1	36.9	33.7	35.1	40.4	35.8	33.7	37.3	37.5	33.2	31.5
Germany	34.1	37.3	35.4	36.9	40.2	35.7	39.6	42.4	43.6	42.1	42.7
Brazil	33.3	33.9	32.0	34.1	36.1	31.4	32.6	35.4	34.4	30.2	33.3
Iran	31.8	31.4	30.7	30.6	28.3	29.0	25.6	24.5	21.8	17.9	16.1
Vietnam	24.7	22.0	19.2	20.0	23.0	19.9	17.5	15.5	10.3	7.8	5.7
Italy	20.7	20.0	21.1	21.6	24.4	20.4	23.2	24.5	24.0	23.3	22.0
Indonesia	19.0	18.6	16.8	15.6	14.8	12.9	7.8	6.2	5.2	4.8	4.9
Taiwan	17.1	19.2	19.1	20.8	23.2	21.0	22.0	23.2	23.2	21.8	21.4
Mexico	13.5	13.8	16.4	18.4	18.5	16.8	18.4	20.2	20.0	19.0	18.3
Spain	11.9	11.9	11.4	11.6	14.2	11.0	13.6	14.3	14.5	13.6	14.9
Canada	11.5	12.3	12.2	12.1	13.0	11.0	12.9	13.4	13.7	12.7	12.5
Saudi Arabia	10.8	9.6	9.9	9.9	8.7	7.8	8.2	5.2	4.8	5.5	5.7
Egypt	10.6	10.7	10.4	9.8	10.3	8.2	7.3	7.8	6.8	5.0	5.5
France	9.8	10.8	10.0	12.1	13.9	11.6	14.4	15.4	15.5	14.6	15.0
Malaysia	9.0	9.0	7.5	7.2	6.7	6.6	6.8	4.1	2.8	2.8	3.8
Austria	7.6	7.1	7.1	7.5	7.9	6.8	7.4	6.9	8.1	7.4	7.7
Ukraine	7.4	7.6	6.2	6.3	21.4	20.6	20.8	21.1	22.7	24.2	22.9
Belgium	7.2	7.1	5.9	7.0	6.9	6.1	7.8	8.0	7.7	7.7	7.2
Poland	7.2	7.1	6.4	7.4	8.5	7.9	9.0	10.8	10.3	8.9	9.1
Netherlands	6.5	6.4	4.7	6.1	6.6	6.1	6.7	6.8	6.8	6.9	7.0
Algeria	5.3	4.5	4.4	4.3	3.5	3.0	2.4	2.3	0.4	4.62	4.4
Australia	5.2	4.7	5.3	5.6	5.8	5.5	5.5	5.7	5.3	5.3	4.9
Thailand	5.0	4.9	5.0	5.3	5.5	4.5	4.2	6.4	4.5	3.8	3.7
Bangladesh	4.5	4.5	5.0	6.0	5.5	4.7	5.1	3.8	3.5	—	—
South Africa	4.5	4.7	5.0	4.5	5.0	3.9	6.2	5.7	6.3	6.1	7.6
Kazakhstan	4.3	4.2	3.9	4.2	4.5	3.9	4.1	4.0	4.4	4.2	3.6
Argentina	4.0	3.9	4.9	5.1	4.9	3.7	4.6	5.2	4.6	4.1	5.0
Sweden	4.0	4.0	4.3	4.4	4.7	4.4	4.7	4.7	4.7	4.62	4.4
United Arab Emirates	3.8	3.7	3.8	3.7	3.0	2.7	3.3	3.2	3.3	3.2	3.0
Finland	3.7	3.7	3.8	3.5	4.3	3.5	3.5	4.1	4.0	4.1	4.0
Slovakia	3.7	3.9	4.4	3.9	4.9	3.4	3.9	5.2	5.0	4.8	4.6
Pakistan	3.6	4.1	5.3	6.0	5.4	3.8	3.3	4.7	5.0	3.6	2.9
Iraq	3.0	3.0	2.8	3.3	2.8	2.0	2.0	2.0	2.0	2.0	2.0
Oman	3.0	3.0	2.9	2.9	2.8	2.5	2.0	2.0	2.0	2.0	2.0
Czech Republic	2.5	2.5	3.4	4.3	4.8	4.5	4.4	4.9	4.6	5.3	5.3
United Kingdom	2.5	4.0	5.6	6.0	7.2	7.1	7.2	7.3	7.5	7.6	10.8
Others	2.3	2.3	1.4	0.3	0.3	0.3	—	—	—	—	—
Portugal	2.1	1.9	2.0	1.9	2.0	2.2	—	—	—	—	—
Luxembourg	1.8	1.8	1.9	1.9	2.1	1.9	—	—	—	—	—
Belarus	1.8	2.3	2.3	2.0	2.5	2.5	2.6	2.5	2.4	2.2	2.6
Kenya	1.8	1.8	1.4	0.5	0.5	0.4	—	—	—	—	—
Philippines	1.8	1.8	1.9	1.6	1.6	0.9	—	—	—	—	—
Qatar	1.7	1.2	1.1	1.1	1.0	1.2	—	—	—	—	—
Peru	1.6	1.6	1.6	1.8	1.2	0.7	—	—	—	—	—
Morocco	1.5	1.4	1.4	1.6	1.1	1.0	—	—	—	—	—
Serbia	1.4	1.4	1.5	1.7	1.7	1.5	—	—	—	—	—
Colombia	1.4	1.3	1.4	1.3	1.3	1.1	—	—	—	—	—
Greece	1.4	1.3	1.2	1.5	1.5	1.4	—	—	—	—	—
Switzerland	1.2	1.2	1.2	1.2	1.3	1.2	—	—	—	—	—
Nigeria	1.2	1.2	1.2	0.7	0.7	0.7	—	—	—	—	—
Bahrain	1.2	1.2	1.3	1.2	1.2	0.9	—	—	—	—	—
Libya	1.1	0.9	0.9	0.7	0.7	—	—	—	—	—	—
Kuwait	1.1	1.0	1.0	0.9	1.3	1.3	—	—	—	—	—
Uzbekistan	1.0	1.0	1.0	1.0	1.1	0.9	—	—	—	—	—
Romania	0.9	1.4	1.6	2.6	3.4	2.8	3.5	3.5	—	—	—
Chile	0.5	0.8	1.2	1.2	1.3	1.2	—	—	—	—	—

=== 1980–2015 ===
This is a list of countries by steel production from 1980 to 2015, based on data provided by the World Steel Association. All countries with annual production of crude steel at least 2 million metric tons.

Crude steel production in 1980–2015 (million metric tons)
Country/Region	2015	2014	2013	2012	2011	2010	2000	1990	1980
World	1,620.4	1,670.1	1,649.3	1,552.9	1,490.1	1,413.6	850.1	770.4	716.4
China	803.8	822.7	779.0	724.7	683.3	626.7	128.5	66.4	37.1
India	89.6	87.3	81.2	77.3	72.2	68.3	26.9	15.0	9.5
Japan	105.2	110.7	110.6	107.2	107.6	109.6	106.4	110.3	111.4
United States	78.9	88.2	87.0	88.6	86.2	80.6	101.8	89.7	101.4
Russia	71.1	71.5	69.4	70.6	68.7	66.9	59.1	89.6	—
South Korea	69.7	71.5	66.0	69.3	68.5	58.5	43.1	23.1	8.5
Germany	42.7	42.9	42.6	42.7	44.3	43.8	46.4	44.0	51.1
Turkey	31.5	34.0	34.7	35.9	34.1	29.0	14.3	9.4	2.5
Brazil	33.3	33.9	34.2	34.7	35.2	32.8	27.9	20.6	15.3
Iran	16.1	16.3	15.4	14.5	13.0	12.0	6.6	1.4	0.5
Ukraine	22.9	27.2	32.8	32.9	35.3	33.6	31.8	54.6	52.3
Italy	22.0	23.7	24.1	27.2	28.7	25.8	26.8	25.5	26.5
Taiwan	21.4	23.1	22.3	20.7	20.2	19.8	—	—	—
Indonesia	4.9	4.4	2.6	2.3	3.6	3.6	2.9	2.8	0.5
Mexico	18.3	19.0	18.2	18.1	18.1	17.0	15.6	8.7	7.1
Canada	12.5	12.7	12.4	13.5	13.1	13.0	16.6	12.3	15.9
Spain	14.9	14.3	13.7	13.6	15.6	16.3	15.8	12.9	12.8
France	15.0	16.1	15.7	15.6	15.8	15.4	21.0	19.0	23.1
Egypt	5.5	6.5	6.8	6.6	6.5	6.7	2.8	2.2	1.0
Saudi Arabia	5.7	6.3	5.4	5.2	5.3	5.0	3.0	1.8	0.1
Malaysia	3.8	4.3	4.7	5.6	5.9	4.1	3.7	1.1	0.2
Vietnam	5.7	5.9	5.6	5.3	4.9	2.7	0.3	0.1	0.1
Austria	7.7	7.9	7.9	7.4	7.5	7.2	5.7	4.3	4.6
Belgium	7.2	7.3	7.1	7.4	8.1	8.1	11.6	11.5	12.3
Poland	9.1	8.6	8.0	8.4	8.8	8.0	10.5	13.6	19.5
Netherlands	7.0	7.0	6.7	6.9	6.9	6.7	5.7	5.4	5.3
Thailand	3.7	4.1	3.6	3.3	4.2	3.7	2.1	0.7	0.5
Australia	4.9	4.6	4.7	4.9	6.4	7.3	7.1	6.6	7.6
South Africa	7.6	6.6	7.2	7.1	6.7	8.5	8.5	8.7	9.1
Algeria	4.4	4.5	4.4	4.3	4.9	4.8	5.2	4.5	4.2
Kazakhstan	3.6	3.7	3.3	3.9	4.7	4.3	4.7	7.4	—
Pakistan	2.9	2.4	1.9	1.6	1.6	1.4	1.0	0.8	—
Sweden	4.4	4.5	4.4	4.3	4.9	4.8	5.2	4.5	4.2
United Kingdom	10.8	12.1	11.9	9.6	9.5	9.7	15.2	17.8	11.3
Slovakia	4.6	4.7	4.5	4.4	4.2	4.6	3.7	5.1	—
Argentina	5.0	5.5	5.2	5.0	5.7	5.1	4.5	3.6	2.7
United Arab Emirates	3.0	2.4	2.9	2.4	2.0	0.5	0.1	—	—
Finland	4.0	3.8	3.5	3.8	4.0	4.0	4.1	2.9	2.5
Oman	2.0	2.1	2.1	2.0	2.0	1.5	1.1	0.8	0.7
Iraq	2.0	2.1	2.1	2.0	2.0	1.5	1.1	0.8	0.7
Czech Republic	5.3	5.4	5.2	5.1	5.6	5.2	6.2	9.7	—
Belarus	2.6	2.5	2.2	2.7	2.6	2.5	1.5	1.5	—
North Korea	1.25	1.25	1.25	1.28	1.3	1.3	1.5	7.0	5.8
Hungary	1.68	1.15	0.88	1.54	1.75	1.68	1.87	2.96	3.76
Bulgaria	0.54	0.61	0.52	0.63	0.84	0.74	2.02	2.18	2.57
Others	—	28.4	29.5	29.9	29.5	23.3	—	—	—

== Exports and imports ==
This is a list of the top (net) steel exporters and imports in 2023, in millions of tonnes. The net exports is the amount of exports minus the amount of imports, while the net imports is the amount of imports minus the amount of exports.

Country	Exports	Net exports	Imports	Net imports
China	94.3	83.2	11.0	–
Japan	32.2	26.3	–	–
South Korea	27.0	12.0	15.0	–
European Union	26.0	–	39.2	22.0
Germany	22.5	3.8	18.7	–
Italy	16.1	–	18.7	–
Belgium	14.6	3.0	11.6	–
Russia	13.9	12.7	–	–
Turkey	12.7	–	18.0	5.2
Brazil	12.3	7.3	–	–
Iran	11.9	10.2	–	–
Netherlands	11.8	2.8	9.0	–
France	9.9	–	11.8	–
India	9.9	–	9.8	–
Indonesia	9.6	–	12.4	2.8
Taiwan	9.5	2.0	7.5	–
United States	8.9	–	26.4	17.6
Vietnam	8.6	–	14.0	5.4
Spain	7.8	–	10.2	–
Malaysia	7.6	–	7.1	–
Oman	–	3.8	–	–
Austria	–	3.6	–	–
Ukraine	–	2.2	–	–
Slovakia	–	1.5	–	–
Luxembourg	–	1.5	–	–
Mexico	–	–	17.5	14.4
Thailand	–	–	13.7	12.0
Poland	–	–	11.6	6.5
Canada	–	–	8.6	–
Egypt	–	–	–	15.2
Philippines	–	–	–	6.9
United Arab Emirates	–	–	–	4.5
Iraq	–	–	–	4.4
Saudi Arabia	–	–	–	3.4
Czech Republic	–	–	–	2.7
Singapore	–	–	–	2.7

== World steel production trend ==
Development of the worldwide production of steel in millions of tons.

World production in millions of tons
1900–1925		1925–1950		1950–1975		1975–2000		2000–2023	
Year	Prod.	Year	Prod.	Year	Prod.	Year	Prod.	Year	Prod.
1900	28.3	1925	90.4	1950	191.6	1975	643.0	2000	850.1
1901	31.0	1926	93.4	1951	211.1	1976	675.5	2001	851.1
1902	34.5	1927	101.8	1952	211.6	1977	675.6	2002	904.2
1903	36.1	1928	110.0	1953	234.8	1978	717.2	2003	969.9
1904	36.3	1929	120.8	1954	223.8	1979	746.4	2004	1,071.4
1905	44.9	1930	95.1	1955	270.0	1980	716.4	2005	1,144.0
1906	51.2	1931	69.6	1956	283.5	1981	707.0	2006	1,247.1
1907	53.0	1932	50.7	1957	292.5	1982	645.0	2007	1,351.3
1908	41.4	1933	68.0	1958	274.3	1983	663.4	2008	1,326.5
1909	54.2	1934	82.4	1959	305.7	1984	710.3	2009	1,219.7
1910	60.3	1935	99.5	1960	346.4	1985	718.9	2010	1,413.6
1911	60.5	1936	124.3	1961	351.3	1986	714.0	2011	1,490.1
1912	72.8	1937	135.7	1962	360.1	1987	735.5	2012	1,552.9
1913	76.4	1938	110.0	1963	387.1	1988	780.1	2013	1,649.3
1914	60.4	1939	137.1	1964	433.4	1989	786.0	2014	1,670.1
1915	66.6	1940	140.6	1965	454.0	1990	770.4	2015	1,620.4
1916	78.2	1941	153.8	1966	472.7	1991	733.6	2016	1,606.3
1917	82.0	1942	151.4	1967	497.2	1992	719.7	2017	1,674.8
1918	77.2	1943	159.6	1968	529.8	1993	727.5	2018	1,808.4
1919	58.5	1944	151.2	1969	574.6	1994	725.1	2019	1,869.9
1920	72.5	1945	113.1	1970	595.4	1995	752.3	2020	1,883.3
1921	45.2	1946	111.6	1971	582.6	1996	750.1	2021	1,962.5
1922	68.8	1947	136.0	1972	630.7	1997	799.0	2022	1,889.2
1923	78.3	1948	155.3	1973	697.5	1998	777.3	2023	1,904.1
1924	78.5	1949	160.0	1974	703.8	1999	789.3	2024	1,886.3
1925	90.4	1950	191.6	1975	643.0	2000	850.1	–	

== See also ==
- Steel industry
- Global steel industry trends
- List of steel producers
- List of countries by iron ore production
