= History of the steel industry (1970–present) =

The global steel industry has been going through major changes since 1970. China has emerged as a major producer and consumer, and India has, to a lesser extent. Consolidation has been rapid in Europe. According to the 2019 International Energy Agency (IEA) report, the iron and steel industry directly contributed 2.6 Gt to global CO_{2} emissions and accounted for 7% of global energy demand. Singapore is the world's main trading hub for iron, with about 90% of the world's iron ore derivatives traded on their stock exchange.

== Growth of the industry ==
Global steel production grew enormously in the 20th century from a mere 28 million tonnes at the beginning of the century to 781 million tons at the end. Per-capita steel consumption in the US peaked in 1977, then fell by half before staging a modest recovery to levels well below the peak.

=== World steel production in the 20th century ===
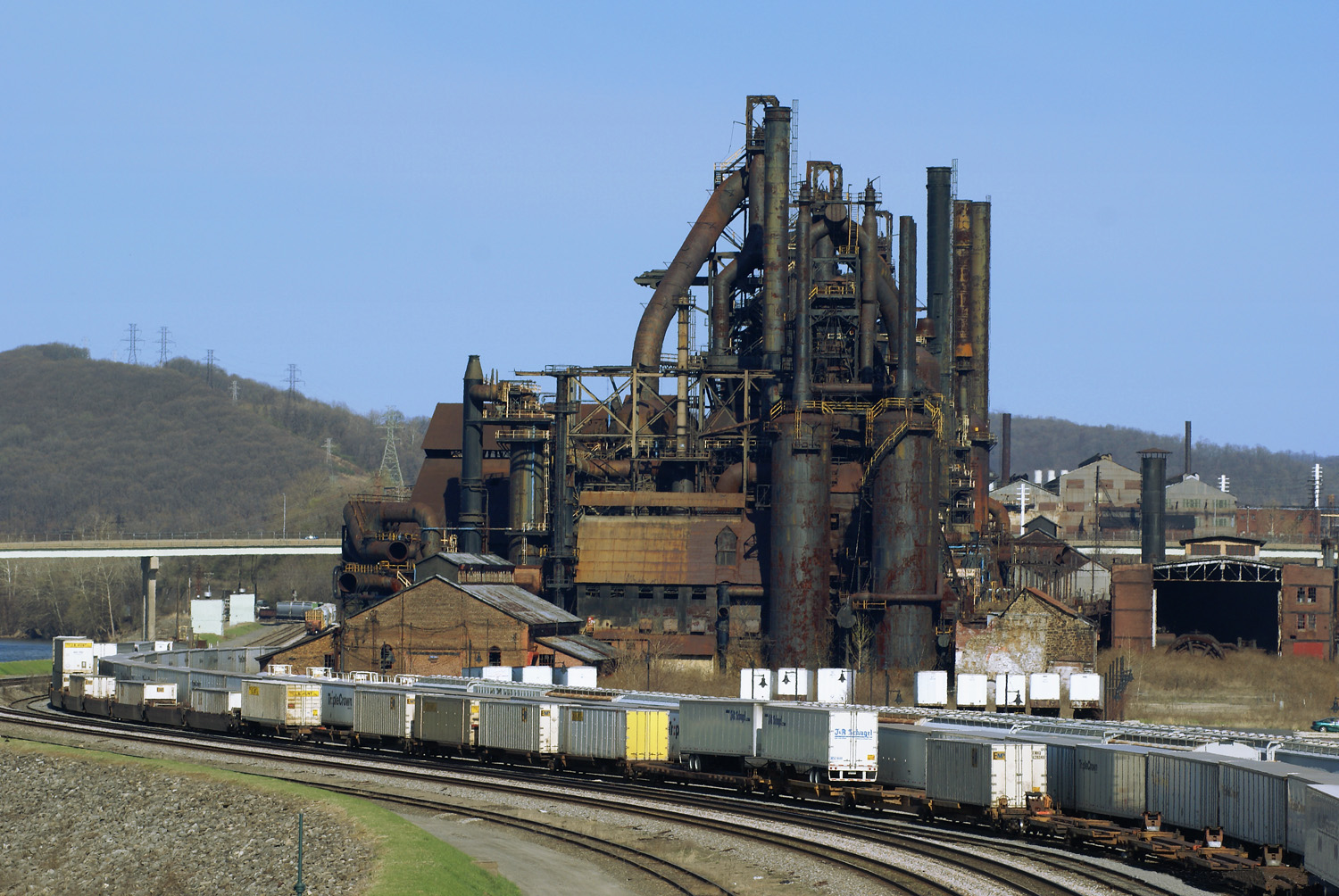
Bethlehem Steel in Bethlehem, Pennsylvania (closed in 2003) was one of the world's largest manufacturers of steel.

Production of crude steel has risen at an astounding rate, reaching 1.691 billion tonnes by 2017.

During the 20th century, the consumption of steel increased at an average annual rate of 3.3%. In 1900, the United States was producing 37% of the world's steel, but with post war industrial development in Asia and centralised investment by China, by 2017 China alone accounted for 50%, with Europe (including the former Soviet Union) down to 24% and North America down to 6%.

For details of country-wise steel production see steel production by country.

== Growth potential of the industry ==
Amongst the other newly steel-producing countries, in 2017 South Korea produces 71 million tonnes, nearly double Germany; and Brazil 34 million tonnes; all three countries have not changed much since 2011. Indian steel production in 2017 was just over 100 million tonnes; up substantially from 70 million tonnes in 2011 – compared to only 1 million tonnes at the time of its independence in 1947. By 1991, when the economy was opened up steel production grew to around 14 million tonnes. Thereafter, it doubled in the next 10 years, and then it is doubling again, maybe over a slightly longer span.

The world steel industry flattened from 2007 to 2009 at 1,300 million tonnes, before rising again, due to worldwide recession starting in 2008, with its heavy cutbacks in construction, sharply lowered demand and prices falling 40%. Showing the impact of that plateau, in 2007 ThyssenKrupp spent $12 billion to build the two most modern mills in the world, situated in Alabama and Brazil. They lost $11 billion on the new plants, which sold steel below the cost of production. Finally in 2013, the plants were sold at under $4 billion.

Nowadays, the steel industry is on the edge of a major technological evolution to deal with the huge amounts of CO_{2} produced in the conventional steelmaking process. The use of blast furnaces and basic oxygen furnace produces around 1.8 ton of CO_{2} per ton of steel produced. In order to reach the climate objectives as stated in the Paris Climate Agreement, the European Green Deal, etc., the steel industry will have to implement carbon capture and sequestration or carbon capture and utilization technology or change to less conventional steelmaking technologies such as the electric arc furnace route. Other alternatives are the use of biomass, plastic waste or hydrogen as reducing agent in the blast furnace instead of coal.

== Reduction in workforce ==
A modern steel plant employs very few people per tonne, compared to the past. In South Korea, Posco employs 29,648 people to produce 28 million tonnes.

During the period 1974 to 1999, the steel industry had drastically reduced employment all around the world. In the US, it was down from 521,000 to 153,000. In Japan, from 459,000 to 208,000; Germany from 232,000 to 78,000; UK from 197,000 to 31,000; Brazil from 118,000 to 59,000; South Africa from 100,000 to 54,000. South Korea already had a low figure. It was only 58,000 in 1999. The steel industry had reduced its employment around the world by more than 1,500,000 in 25 years.

== See also ==
- American Iron and Steel Institute
- British Steel Corporation
- Dominion Steel and Coal Corporation, in Canada
- European Coal and Steel Community
- Iron and steel industry in India
- Iron and steel industry in the United States
- Steel production by country
- Steel Industry (Special Measures) Bill
- Steel industry in China
- Steelmaking

== Appendices ==
Both appendices are from IISI material, earlier on the web but now replaced by more recent data.
