= Steel industry in Italy =

Overview of the steel industry of Italy

The steel industry in Italy originated in the 19th century.

== History ==
The beginnings of the steel industry in Italy were strongly influenced by the modest presence of underground iron ore and coal in particular, that occurred in 1880, an increasing import of pig iron from abroad. With the widespread application of iron in the railways and in the mechanical industry in general witnessed the slow renewal of the old ironworks (with the adoption of Martin-Siemens furnaces and converters from scrap iron). The regions of Italy that contributed most to the expansion of production were Liguria, Lombardy, Piedmont, Tuscany. In 1884 the Italian state, including the potential strategic role of the steel industry, built a large modern steel mill for that period at Terni. At the beginning of the 20th century, to improve the use of iron ore national and limit dependence on foreign, were built some coke furnaces for the production of cast iron: in Portoferraio (with the company Elba) in 1902, in Piombino and finally in Bagnoli. During this period, in 1905, the company ILVA was founded with the support of the Italian government, and acquired the management of the plants in Piombino, Savona, Elba, and later, of the largest plant of Bagnoli, to create a large group of steel production and construction of ships.

== See also ==
- Società Italiana Acciaierie Cornigliano
- Ilva
- Arvedi
- Marcegaglia
