= Oscar Sinigaglia =

Italian engineer and industrialist (1877-1953)

- Born: October 20, 1877; Rome
- Died: June 30, 1953 (aged 75); Rome
- Education: Graduated from university in 1900 with a degree in civil engineering
- Occupation: Civil engineer
- Spouse(s): Marcella Mayer 1926 daughter of it:Teodoro Mayer, the founder of the Il Piccolo, Trieste
- Parents: Moise Angelo (father); Gina Fano (mother)

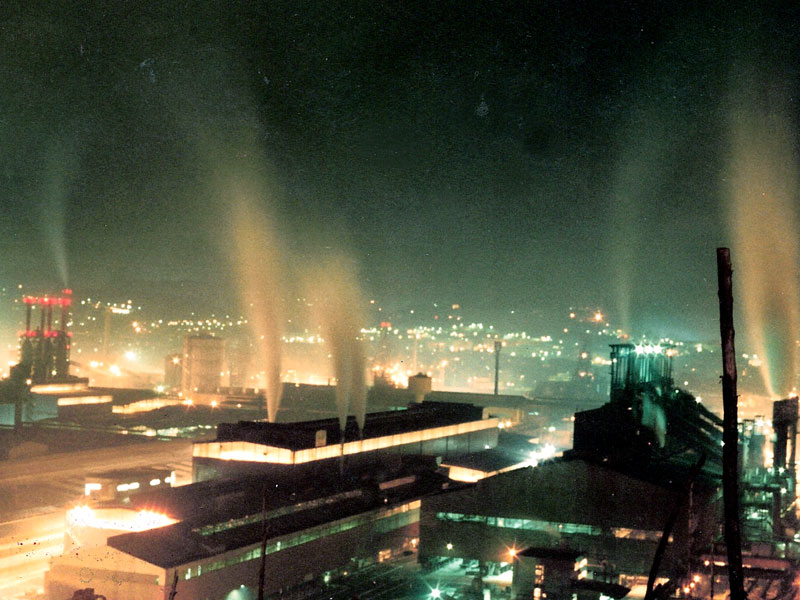
The steelworks in Bagnoli, now decommissioned

Oscar Sinigaglia (1877-1953) was an Italian engineer and industrialist who was born into the Roman Senigaglia family on October 20, 1877.

== Life ==
In 1893, at the age of sixteen, he took over the management of his family's failing business, the Ferriere di Terni, after his father's suicide. Despite inheriting a company plagued by large amounts of debt, liabilities, and interests, his managerial skills allowed him to navigate these financial difficulties. He was eventually able to repay his debts and make the company a success.

After graduating from university in 1900 with a degree in civil engineering, he directed the Ferrotaie society, and also founded the trading company Sinigaglia-Di Porto. In 1908, in the aftermath of the 1908 Messina earthquake in Reggio Calabria and Messina, he took charge as a service engineer to work for earthquake victims.

In 1915, at the beginning of Italy's entrance into World War I, he sold his large and successful steelworks business Alti Forni e Acciaierie d'Italia Ilva (today a successful steel company, Gruppo Riva).

=== Army service ===
After selling his company, he entered the Italian Army as volunteer. During his service in the Italian Army, he earned a silver medal and two bronze medals for bravery. Starting in November 1917, he was Aide-de-camp of Armando Diaz as Chief of Staff of the Italian Army.

In 1918, at the end of the First World War he supported the cause of Italian Fiume, becoming a Nationalist leader and one of the first members of the Fasci Italiani di Combattimento.

=== Marriage ===
In 1919, he was next to his future father-in-law Teodoro Mayer in provision of capital necessary to refound "Il Piccolo" which was destroyed in a fire set by a pro-Austrian in the evening of 23 May 1915. Sinigaglia later married Mayer's daughter, Marcella, in 1926. Thanks to his intervention, the Trieste newspaper returned to print in 20 November 1919. Sinigaglia remained on the board of directors of the company publishing until 1927. During this time he worked for the Italian Ministry of Arms and Ammunition before moving to the head of the Società Finanziaria Industriale Italiana and connected it to the Banca Commerciale Italiana; he conferred the same credit institution all of its state holdings, including the package of Ilva control. Sinigaglia also worked with Ernesto Manuelli and Agostino Rocca, persons with great influence on the subsequent developments of the Italian steel industry.

=== 1930s ===
From 1932 to 1935 he worked directly in Ilva, first as a trustee of Sofindit and then as president. The Roman industrial community expressed Sinigaglia's views of Ilva leadership; in his opinion it was too engaged in personal profit at the expense of the production of wealth, and profit for the community. This made it poorly competitive and did not allow it to hire workers, often forced to emigrate.

The reasons for his resignation, remain unclear, perhaps due to 'escalation of conflict with the leadership of Ilva, which made leverage racial motivation for the removal of a president by the "revolutionary" ideas. Later he held various positions in the Istituto per la Ricostruzione Industriale as a technical trust.

In 1938 as Jew he was ousted from the Italian public life as a result of the Italian Racial Laws. During World War II, he fled with his wife Marcella to Abruzzo, where he converted to Catholicism. After the war, he joined the Christian Democracy (Italy) and became a friend of Alcide De Gasperi.

=== After WWII ===
Possibly because of a vow made during WWII, he ceded to the Vatican Vianini Lavori a Centrifugal casting (industrial) company he owned. In 1945 he became the first commissioner and later the president of Finsider, of which he was in charge of until his death in 1953. During his time as president of Finsider, he oversaw and coordinated the financial Istituto per la Ricostruzione Industriale steel activities. In this capacity, Sinigaglia vigorously rejected the idea that Italy renounced its heavy idea (?) and started the reconstruction and rehabilitation of the Italian steel industry, better known as "Sinigaglia plan", approved by the Italian government in 1948. By 1948 there were three well-built steel mills in Italy: one in Genoa-Cornigliano (then entitled to his name), to Bagnoli and Piombino. The concentration of production in large and modern factories allowed for the alignment of the Italian iron and steel costs to that of the international steel industries. This consequently had a positive impact on the development of various industries.

=== Awards ===
In 1952 he was awarded with the Order of Merit for Labour. In 1955 was built a vessel bulk carrier, Oscar Sinigaglia, with a gross tonnage of 11249.

The Viale Oscar Sinigaglia in Giuliano-Dalmata is named after him.

41.820498°N 12.482224°W
