= World Steel Association =

International trade body

- Abbreviation: worldsteel
- Formation: 10 July 1967
- Type: Industry trade group
- Headquarters: Brussels, Belgium
- Location: Brussels
- Key people: Chairman 2025-2026: Uğur DALBELER, Çolakoğlu Metalurji A.Ş. Vice Chair 2025-2026: Thachat Viswanath NARENDRAN, Tata Steel; Abdulqader ALMUBARAK, Saudi Iron and Steel Company (Hadeed); Treasurer 2025-2026: Mark VASSELLA, BlueScope Steel Limited
- Website: www.worldsteel.org

World Steel Association, abbreviated as worldsteel, is the international industry association for the iron and steel sector. The association is one of the largest and most dynamic industry associations in the world, with members in every major steel-producing country. worldsteel represents steel producers, national and regional steel industry associations, and steel research institutes. Members represent around 85% of global steel production.

It is a non-profit organisation with its headquarters in Brussels, Belgium and a second office in Beijing, China, whose purpose is to promote steel and the steel industry to customers, the industry, media and the general public.

== Membership ==
Regular members consist of companies that have actual raw steel production, including steel alloys and stainless steel, and operate as independent commercial enterprises. State-controlled companies must be free to make their own economic and investment decisions and operate in a market-based economy.

Affiliated members consist of associations or federations of steel producers and any technical society or institute concerned with matters affecting the steel industry.

== Areas of activity ==
The World Steel Association's key areas of activity include:

Safety and health:

The World Steel Association promotes a policy that ensures zero harm to any employee or contractor of the steel industry. The aim is to achieve an accident-free workplace across the industry.

Climate Action:

The World Steel Association has developed a global approach to tackle climate change. The World Steel Association has a policy paper on climate change and the production of iron and steel.

Economics:

The association publishes monthly production statistics and two annual statistical publications: the Steel Statistical Yearbook and World Steel in Figures. Information on future trends is published twice a year, in the form of a short range outlook for steel demand.

Sustainability:

The association and its member companies have formulated a policy on sustainable development to measure the industry's economic, environmental and social performance. The World Steel Association publishes a sustainability report every year.

Automotive:

The World Auto Steel programme stimulates innovation and the use of steel in the automotive sector.

Technology:

Modern steelmaking relies on advanced technologies. worldsteel plays an important role in benchmarking best practices, helping its members improve their businesses. Representatives from member companies meet regularly to exchange information on technological, manufacturing and operational performance.

== History ==
The World Steel Association was founded as the International Iron and Steel Institute (IISI) in Brussels, Belgium on 10 July 1967. IISI opened a second office in Beijing, China, in April, 2006. The organisation changed its name to World Steel Association in October 2008.

== See also ==
- List of European countries by steel production
