= The Call (painting) =

Painting by Paul Gauguin

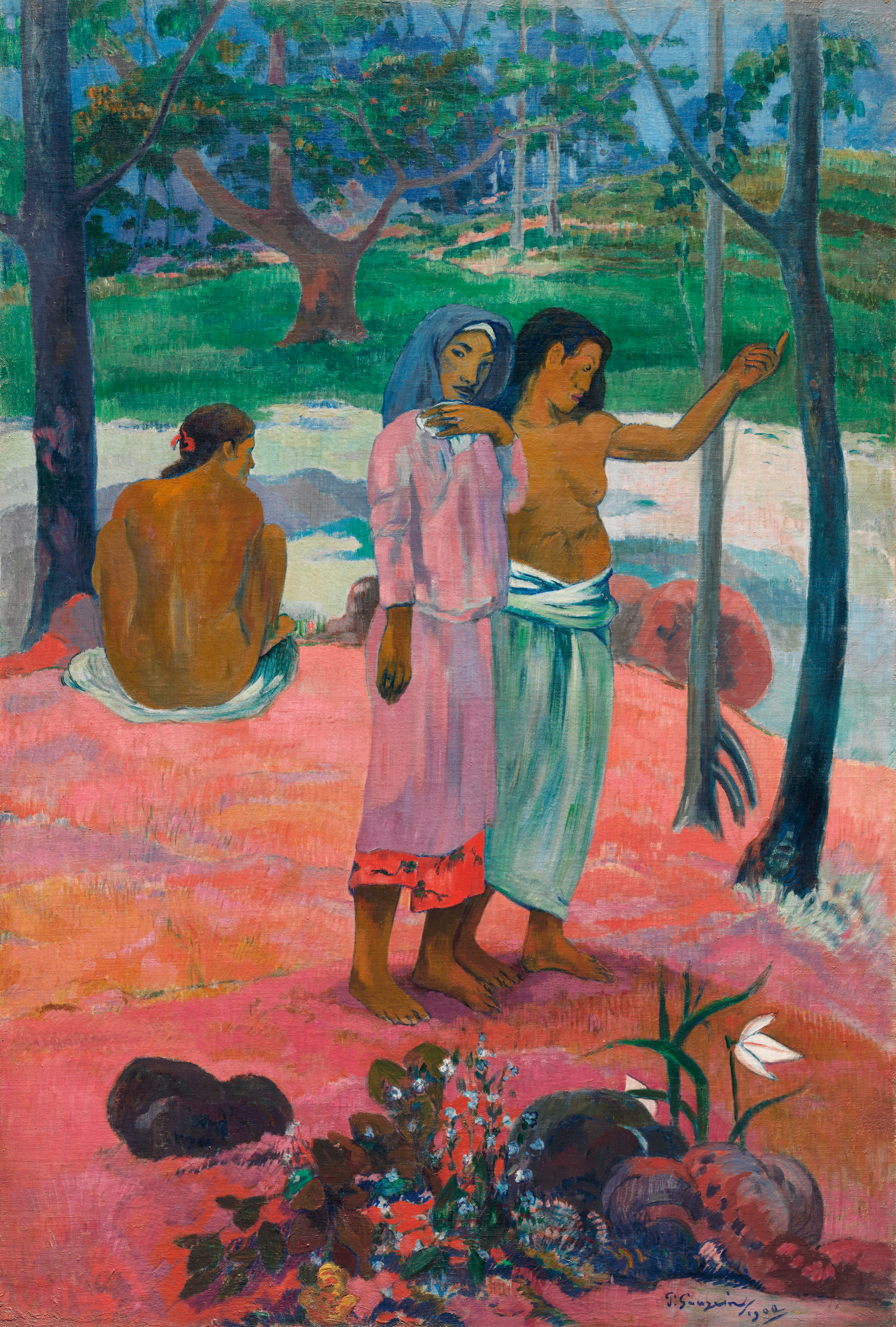
- Artist: Paul Gauguin
- Year: 1902
- Medium: oil on canvas
- Dimensions: 131.3 cm × 89.5 cm (51.7 in × 35.2 in)
- Location: Cleveland Museum of Art, Ohio, USA

The Call is a 1902 painting by Paul Gauguin, produced in Marquesas, Polynesia a year before the artist's death. It is now in the Cleveland Museum of Art.

The pose of woman on the right extending her hand is a reference to a frieze from the Parthenon.
