= The House in Nazareth =

1630 painting by Francisco de Zurbarán

Christ and the Virgin in the House at Nazareth
- Year: c. 1630
- Dimensions: 165 cm (65 in) × 218.2 cm (85.9 in)

The House in Nazareth is a 1630 oil on canvas painting by the Spanish artist Francisco de Zurbarán, now in the Cleveland Museum of Art. Zurbaran also produced other variants on the same theme using a similar composition.

The painting shows Jesus as a child to the left weaving a small crown of thorns, one of which has pricked his finger, with the Virgin Mary to the right with a vase of lilies and roses referring to the virgin birth. Neither figure has a halo, though some cherubs' heads appear in a burst of heavenly glory at the top left of the painting. The white cloths around the room symbolise Christ and Mary's purity, the pigeons represent the human soul (whose resurrection Jesus' future Passion will bring) and a pot of water at Jesus' feet alludes to baptism. On the table are open books (suggesting the prophecies of the Messiah in the Hebrew Bible) and pears (symbolising Christ's love for humanity and salvation).

The very conception of painting flees from the ostentatiousness of certain currents of the pictorial Baroque. The composition, bifocal, is very simple. Objects and characters are clearly described; The insistence on the material quality of the objects and their individualization is very striking, facilitated by Zurbarán's dedication to the still life genre. The contrasting light, very typical of tenebrism, gives the painting the appearance of a theatrical performance, and refers to the work of Caravaggio.
