= Harold Woodbury Parsons =

American art historian and dealer

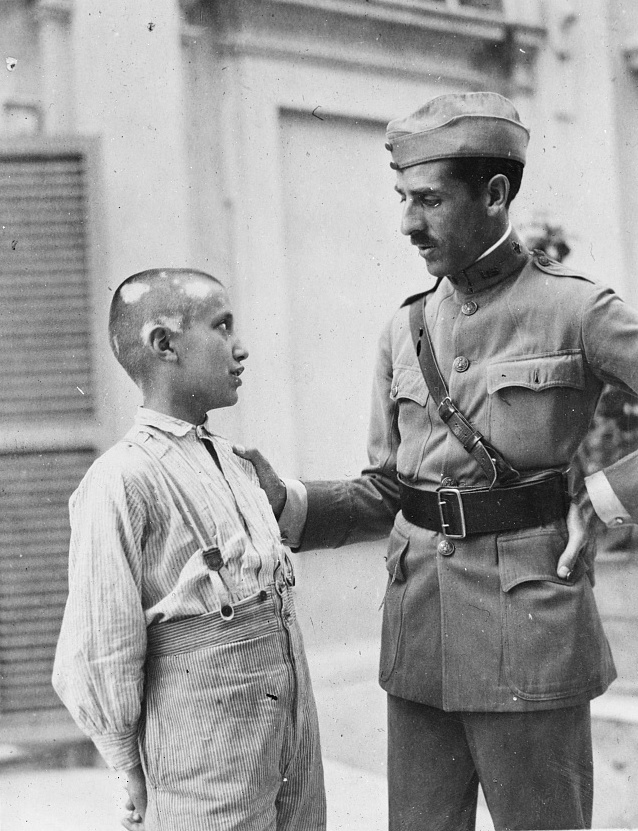
Capt. Harold W. Parsons, of Boston, American Red Cross

Harold Woodbury Parsons (July 13, 1882 – May 27, 1967) was an American art historian and dealer from Lynn, Massachusetts. In 1930 he was brought in as art advisor to the Nelson-Atkins Museum. In 1960, he was instrumental in exposing certain supposed Etruscan masterpieces as fakes.

Parsons died in Rome, aged 85, of myocardiosclerosis and heart failure. His ashes were interred at Campo Verano.
