= 2013 in art =

The year 2013 in art involved various significant events.

== Events ==
- March 9 – The identification of Portrait of Olivia Porter as an original work of the 1630s by Sir Anthony van Dyck is announced. It is in the collection of the Bowes Museum, County Durham, England.
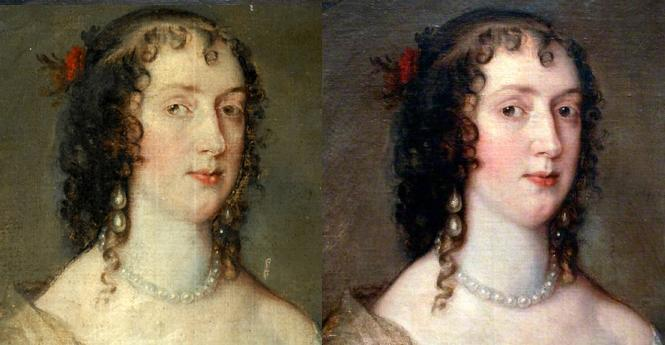
  Portrait of Olivia Boteler Porter by Anthony van Dyck before and after restoration. The version on the left was the photograph originally posted to the Your Paintings website.
- March 18 – The identification of Self-portrait wearing a white feathered bonnet as an original work of 1635 by Rembrandt is announced. Hanging in Buckland Abbey, Devon, England, it is the only painting by this artist in the collection of the British National Trust for Places of Historic Interest or Natural Beauty to whom it was gifted in 2010.
- April – The philanthropist and art collector Leonard Lauder promises for donation his important collection of Cubist works by artists including Pablo Picasso, Georges Braque and Juan Gris estimated to be valued at over one billion US dollars to the Metropolitan Museum of Art in New York City.
- April 13 – The Rijksmuseum in Amsterdam is re-opened by Queen Beatrix of the Netherlands after a ten-year refurbishment.
- May – Extension to Lenbachhaus art museum, designed by Foster and Partners, is opened in Munich.
- May 9 – Charles Ray's sculpture "Boy with Frog" is removed by the city of Venice from where it stood before the Punta della Dogana overlooking where the Grand Canal meets the Giudecca Canal. The work which had been commissioned by Francois-Henri Pinault to stand outside the aforementioned historic building which serves as an annex to his main museum housed in the Palazzo Grassi is replaced by a contemporary copy of a streetlamp which once stood at the same spot.
- July–October – Gromit Unleashed in Bristol, England.
- July 10 – Reclusive English artist Audrey Amiss dies at the age of 79 in London, leaving behind a personal archive including hundreds of albums and books, and around 50,000 sketches.
- July 14 – The dedication of the statue of Rachel Carson in Woods Hole, Massachusetts.
- July 25 – Katharina Fritsch's sculpture Hahn/Cock is unveiled on the fourth plinth, Trafalgar Square, London.
- October – The English street artist Banksy stages an entire month of daily public installations all over New York City entitled "Better Out Than In".
- October 21 – Cleveland Museum of Art director David Franklin resigns citing personal reasons. Numerous published sources later revealed that the married Franklin had been involved in an affair with a subordinate. When this revelation came to the attention of the board, Franklin chose to leave. The woman in question, Christina Gaston, committed suicide.
- November 3 – The magazine Focus reveals that in March 2012, 121 framed and 1,258 unframed artworks were discovered by German customs authorities in an apartment in Schwabing, Munich. Seized from the possession of Cornelius Gurlitt, son of 1930s and later degenerate art dealer Hildebrand Gurlitt, the cache includes works by Marc Chagall, Henri Matisse, Otto Dix and others.
- November 12 – The triptych Three Studies of Lucian Freud by the painter Francis Bacon sells for US$142.4 million (including the buyer's premium) to an unnamed buyer at Christie's New York auction house, becoming the most expensive work of art ever to be sold at auction. The 2013 sale also represents the highest price paid for a work by a British artist, beating Bacon's Triptych 1976, which fetched $86.3 million in May 2008.
- November 19 – Museo Júmex in Mexico City, designed by David Chipperfield, is opened to show part of the contemporary art Colección Júmex.
- November 20 – The "Graffiti Mecca" 5Pointz on the sides of a twentieth-century warehouse in Long Island City, Queens, New York, is whitewashed by a team of painters in the employ of the site's new developers.
- November 25 – "The Church of Vezzoli", the PS1, New York City leg of Italian artist Francesco Vezzoli's three part retrospective, "The Trinity", is cancelled after the church he arranged to buy in the town of Montegiordano for deployment in the exhibition is remanded in Italy prior to its leaving the country for the United States.
- November 28 – The Tetley (Leeds) opens as a contemporary art gallery in England.
- December 4 – Pérez Art Museum Miami, designed by Herzog & de Meuron, is opened.
- December 12 – From today until March 16, 2014, the Dying Gaul is put on display in the main rotunda of the west wing of the National Gallery of Art in Washington D.C. This temporary tenure marks the first time the antiquity has left Italy since it was returned in the second decade of the nineteenth century after Napoleon brought it to the Louvre in 1797 as a plunder of war.

== Exhibitions ==
- February 1 until May 6 – "Carl Andre: Mass & Matter" at the Turner Contemporary, Margate, England.
- February 3 until May 9 – "Llyn Foulkes" at the Hammer Museum at UCLA in Los Angeles, California.
- February 15 until May 8 – "Gutai: Splendid Playground" at the Solomon R. Guggenheim Museum, New York City.
- March 5 until May 27 – "Street" by James Nares at the Metropolitan Museum of Art in New York City
- March 16 until June 16 – Karl Stirner "Transformations II: Works in Steel" at the Michener Art Museum in Doylestown, Pennsylvania
- March 23 – August 11 – "David Bowie is" at the Victoria and Albert Museum in London, England.
- May 3 until September 29 – "Jack Goldstein x 10,000" at the Jewish Museum in New York City.
- May 12 until October 6 – "Diaghilev and the Ballets Russes, 1909–1929: When Art Danced with Music" at the National Gallery of Art, in Washington D.C.
- May 23 until October 6 – "Hopper Drawing at the Whitney Museum of American Art in New York City.
- May 29 until November 24 – "Galleria Vezzoli" by Francesco Vezzoli at MAXXI in Rome, Italy.
- June 1 until October 27 – Sir Anthony Caro at the Museo Correr, Venice, Italy.
- June 21 until September 25 – "James Turrell: Video Transcript at the Solomon R. Guggenheim Museum in New York City.
- June 22 until September 23 – "Richard Diebenkorn: The Berkeley Years, 1953–1966" at the de Young Museum in San Francisco, California.
- August 3 until November 3 – Peter Doig: "No Foreign Lands" at the Scottish National Gallery, Edinburgh.
- August 10 until November 3 – "Soundings: A Contemporary Score", at the Museum of Modern Art, New York City.
- August 17 – January 5, 2014 – "Hammer Projects: Maya Hayuk" at the Hammer Museum at UCLA in Los Angeles, California.
- September 22 until January 4, 2014 – "Milloff's Melville" at the Lyman Allyn Art Museum in New London, Connecticut
- September 26 until January 4, 2014 – "Robert Indiana: Beyond Love" at the Whitney Museum of American Art in New York City.
- September 28, 2013, until January 6, 2014 – "The Avant-Gardes of Fin-de-Siècle Paris" at the Peggy Guggenheim Collection in Venice, Italy
- October 2 until January 14, 2014 – "Chris Burden: Extreme Measures" at the New Museum of Contemporary Art in New York City.
- October 4 until January 26, 2014 – "Harry Holtzman and American Abstraction" at the Florence Griswold Museum in Old Lyme, Connecticut.
- October 5 until March 16, 2014 – The Carnegie International at the Carnegie Museum of Art in Pittsburgh, Pennsylvania.
- October 23 until March – "Damage Control: Art and Destruction SINCE 1950" at the Hirshhorn Museum and Sculpture Garden in Washington D.C.
- October 24 until May 26, 2014 – Christopher Wool at the Solomon R. Guggenheim Museum in New York City.
- November 7 until February 2 – ""And Materials and Money in Crisis" (curated by Richard Birkett in dialogue with Sam Lewitt) at MOMUK (museum moderner kunst stiftung ludwig wien) Vienna, Austria.
- December 3 – February 23, 2014 – "Phyllida Barlow: Hoard" at the Norton Museum of Art in West Palm Beach, Florida.
- December 2013 – February 2014 – In 2013, the Brooklyn Rail established Rail Curatorial Projects, an initiative to manifest the journal's goals within an exhibition context. That same year, the Brooklyn Rail was invited by the Dedalus Foundation to curate an exhibition which resulted in Come Together: Surviving Sandy, Year One (2013, Industry City), a momentous exhibition of hundreds of New York and Brooklyn artists. Come Together was named the #1 exhibition in New York City by Jerry Saltz in New York Magazine In 2014, the exhibition was commemorated in a hardcover catalogue.

== Works ==
- March 5 – The Bay Lights, a 75th-anniversary site-specific monumental light sculpture and art installation on the San Francisco–Oakland Bay Bridge designed by light artist Leo Villareal, is inaugurated.
- March 7 – Peter Fischli & David Weiss's Rock on Top of Another Rock is unveiled outside the Serpentine Galleries in London.
- March 16 – "Big Air Package" Christo filled the Gasometer Oberhausen with the "largest ever inflated envelops without aid of a skeleton" and the installation continued until December 30. It was the first major work by the artist following the passing of his wife and artistic collaborator, Jeanne-Claude.
- April – The Coronation Theatre, Westminster Abbey: A Portrait of Her Majesty Queen Elizabeth II, official painted portrait of The Queen to mark her Diamond Jubilee, painted by Australian artist Ralph Heimans is shown at the National Portrait Gallery in Canberra, Australia.
- Pawel Althamer - The Venetians (created for and exhibited at the 55th Venice Biennale)
- Nuray Anahtar – Mustafa Kemal Atatürk (sculpture, Washington, D.C.)
- Lawrence Argent - Flowing Kiss, sculpture, Columbus, Ohio
- Michaël Borremans – The Angel (painting)
- Alex Chinneck – From the Knees of my Nose to the Belly of my Toes is installed in Margate and Under the Weather But Over the Moon in Blackfriars Road, London, England.
- Gregory Coates - "Blue Feather"
- William Cochran – Pillar of Fire (sculpture, Washington, D.C.)
- Devin Laurence Field – Barometer (sculpture, Hillsboro, Oregon)
- Blessing Hancock & Joe O'Connell – Heart Beacon (sculpture, Portland, Oregon)
- Ann Hirsch - Statue of Bill Russell at Boston City Hall in Boston, Massachusetts
- Anthony Padgett - Praying Shell (scultuptural memorial to Chinese labourers who died illegally harvesting cockles - located near Red Bank Farm, on the edge of Morecambe Bay in Lancashire, North West England)
- Juan Carlos Pinto and others - Mosaic mural in memoriam to Ric Menello and then continuing into the Newark Plaza tunnel entrance mural (ongoing) in Brooklyn, New York
- Phil Proctor – Iron Column (sculpture, Atlanta)
- Andy Scott - The Kelpies (sculptures standing between Falkirk and Grangemouth in Scotland)
- Sebastián - Monument to Mexicanness in Juarez, Mexico
- Austin Weishel – Ashes to Answers (sculpture, Washington, D.C.)
- Henry Taylor - Portrait of Steve Cannon
- Ursula von Rydingsvard - Ona at Barclays Center im Brooklyn, New York
- Fred Wilson - "I Saw Othello's Visage in My Mind"

== Awards ==
- Archibald Prize – Del Kathryn Barton for "hugo"
- Carnegie Prize – Nicole Eisenman
- New Year Honours (UK) 2014 (announced December 31, 2013) –
  - Knight Bachelor: Antony Gormley
- Praemium Imperiale laureate for sculpture – Antony Gormley (UK)
- The Venice Biennale (June 1 – November 24):
  - Leone d'Oro (Golden Lion) for lifetime achievement: Maria Lassnig and Marisa Merz
  - Leone d'Oro for the Best Artist of the international exhibition: Tino Sehgal (United Kingdom/Germany)
  - Leone d'Oro for the Best Young Artist: Camille Henrot (France)
  - Leone d'Oro for Best Pavilion: Edson Chagas (Angola)

== Films ==
- Picasso Baby (performance music video)

== Deaths ==
- January 1 – Michael Patrick Cronan, 61, American graphic designer and artist
- January 3 – Ted Godwin, 79, Canadian painter
- January 6 – Ruth Carter Stevenson, 89, American museum founder
- January 7 – Ada Louise Huxtable, 91, American architecture critic (The New York Times)
- January 8 – Kenojuak Ashevak, 85, Canadian Inuk artist
- January 16 – Burhan Doğançay, 83, Turkish artist
- January 19 – Andrée Putman 87, French interior and product designer
- January 25 – Oleg Vassiliev, 81, Russian painter
- January 26 – Shozo Shimamoto, 85, Japanese artist
- January 28
  - Oldřich Kulhánek, 72, Czech painter and graphic designer, designer of banknotes and postage stamps
  - Ceija Stojka, 79, Austrian-Romanian author and painter
- January 30 – Roger Raveel, 91, Belgian painter
- February 6 – Alden Mason, 93, American artist
- February 9
  - Richard Artschwager, 89, American painter, sculptor and illustrator
  - Colin Laverty, 75, Australian collector of indigenous art
- February 24 – Ralph Hotere, 81, New Zealand artist
- February 26
  - Bert Flugelman, 90, Australian sculptor
  - William Perehudoff, 94, Canadian painter
- March 2 – Thomas McEvilley, 73, American art critic and academic
- March 9 – Merton Simpson, 84, American abstract expressionist painter and African and tribal art collector
- March 12 – Ganesh Pyne, 76, Indian painter
- March 23 – Carlos Villa, 76, Filipino American painter
- March 29 – Reginald Gray, 82, Irish painter
- April 1 – Pavel 183, 29, Russian graffiti street artist
- April 9
  - David Hayes, 82, American sculptor
  - Zao Wou Ki (Zhao Wuji), 93, Chinese-French painter
- April 19 – Storm Thorgerson, 69, British graphic designer (The Dark Side of the Moon album cover)
- April 30 – Roberto Chabet, 76, Filipino artist
- May 2 – Charles Banks Wilson, 94, American painter
- May 3 – Herbert Blau, 87, director and theoretician of performance
- May 8 – Taylor Mead, 88, Warhol superstar, actor, New York City art scene regular and poet
- May 15 – Thomas M. Messer, 93, Czech born American director of the Solomon R. Guggenheim Foundation (1961–1988)
- May 21 – Fred Mitchell, 89, American painter
- May 22 – Wayne F. Miller, 94, American photographer
- May 24 – Gotthard Graubner, 82, German painter
- May 26 – Otto Muehl, 87, Austrian artist
- June 1 – Dorothy Napangardi, 60s, Australian indigenous artist
- June 8 – Arturo Vega, 65, Mexican-born American punk graphic designer (logo for The Ramones)
- June 14 – Monica Ross, 62, English performance artist
- June 20 – Jeffrey Smart, 91, Australian painter
- June 21 – Per Ung, 80, Norwegian sculptor
- June 26
  - Sarah Charlesworth, 66, American conceptual artist, photographer
  - Bert Stern, 83, American photographer
- July 6 – John B. Hightower, 80, American museum director
- July 10 – Audrey Amiss, 79, English artist
- July 16 – Alex Colville, 92, Canadian painter
- July 21 – Ronnie Cutrone, 65, American artist
- July 25
  - Walter De Maria, 77, American sculptor of The Lightning Field
  - León Ferrari, 92, Argentine conceptual artist
- August 5 – Ruth Asawa, 87, Japanese American sculptor
- August 10 – Allan Sekula, 62, American artist
- August 17 –Stephen Antonakos, 86, Greek-born American sculptor
- August 28
  - John Bellany, 71, Scottish painter
  - Matt Doust, 29, American born Australian artist
- August 29 – Jack Beal, 82, American painter
- October 8 – Ellen Lanyon 87, American painter
- October 12 – Ulf Linde, 84, Swedish art critic, writer, museum director and member of the Swedish Academy
- October 14 – Frank Moore, 67, American performance artist
- October 23 – Sir Anthony Caro, 89, British sculptor
- October 24 – Deborah Turbeville, 81, American fashion photographer
- October 25 – Arthur Danto, 89, American art critic
- October 27 – Lou Reed, 71, (Art) Rock musician (The Velvet Underground managed by Andy Warhol) and photographer
- November 3 – Leonard Long, 102, Australian painter
- November 12 – Kurt Trampedach, 70, Danish painter and sculptor
- November 23 – Peter B. Lewis, 80, American businessman and arts patron (the Guggenheim Museum and the Cleveland Museum of Art)
- December 1 – Martin Sharp, 71, Australian artist, underground cartoonist, songwriter and film-maker
- December 3 – Sacha Sosno, 76, French sculptor and painter
- December 5 – Günther Förg, 61, German artist, German painter and sculptor
- December 6 – Peeter Mudist, 71, Estonian painter
- December 13 – Harvey Littleton, 91, American glass artist
- December 14
  - C. N. Karunakaran, 73, Indian painter
  - George Rodrigue, 69, American painter (creator of "The Blue Dog" series)
- December 23
  - Robert W. Wilson, 87, American philanthropist, art collector and trustee of the Whitney Museum of American Art
  - Chryssa, 84, Greek American artist
- December 24 – Jean Rustin, 85, French painter
