= WWH (disambiguation) =

WWH may refer to:

- World War Hulk, the 2007 limited series comic book by Marvel Comics
- Whitman-Walker Health, a non-profit community health center in the Washington, D.C.
- Walter Webb Hall, a building on the University of Texas at Austin campus
- Wilh. Wilhelmsen Holding, a Norwegian multinational maritime group
- World-Wide House, an office building in Central, Hong Kong
- Wentworthville railway station, the station code WWH
