= David Franklin =

David Franklin may refer to:

- David Franklin (actor) (born 1962), Australian actor
- David Franklin (broadcaster) (1908–1973), British panel member of the radio show My Music, former opera singer
- David Franklin (curator), former director of the Cleveland Museum of Art
- David Franklin (scientist) (born 1961), American microbiologist and whistleblower regarding pharmaceutical fraud

== See also ==
- David Franklin Houston
- Dave Franklin (1895–1970), Tin Pan Alley songwriter
