= William Griswold (museum director) =

American museum director and curator

- Born: September 19, 1960 (age 66); Harrisburg, Pennsylvania, US
- Education: Trinity College (BA); Courtauld Institute of Art (PhD)
- Occupations: Museum director and curator
- Employer: Cleveland Museum of Art
- Honors: Ordre des Arts et des Lettres; Royal Order of Sahametrei

William M. Griswold (born September 19, 1960) is an American museum director and curator who is director of the Cleveland Museum of Art.

After earning a PhD studying the drawings of Piero di Cosimo in 1988, Griswold held positions as a drawings curator at the Metropolitan Museum of Art and the Morgan Library & Museum. Moving into museum administration, he became associate director of the J. Paul Getty Museum in 2001 and served as its interim director from 2004 to 2005. He then served as director of the Minneapolis Institute of Art from 2005 to 2007 and director of the Morgan from 2007 to 2014.

Griswold assumed his position at the Cleveland Museum of Art in 2014, succeeding David Franklin as the ninth director of the museum. In his tenure, he has overseen initiatives to grow and diversify the museum's audience and address barriers present for members of underrepresented groups within its operations. In the two instances that museum staff discovered the questionable provenance of one of its objects, he has personally led negotiations resulting in their return to their respective countries of origin.

== Early life and education ==
William Griswold was born in Harrisburg, Pennsylvania on September 19, 1960. His father, Robert Edward Griswold, worked as a clinical chemist, while his mother was a homemaker. Growing up in Camp Hill, Pennsylvania, Griswold's family regularly went on road trips to visit museums.

Griswold obtained a bachelor's degree in art history from Trinity College in Connecticut, where he also took classes on French and English literature. Afterwards he went to the Courtauld Institute of Art in London, where he studied the Florentine drawings of the early Renaissance period. In 1988, he completed his dissertation on the collected drawings of Piero di Cosimo, whose "originality and eccentricity" he was drawn to. He would first visit the Cleveland Museum of Art in the 1980s, where he would later serve as director. He admired its holdings of Asian art and The Crucifixion of Saint Andrew.

== Curatorial work ==
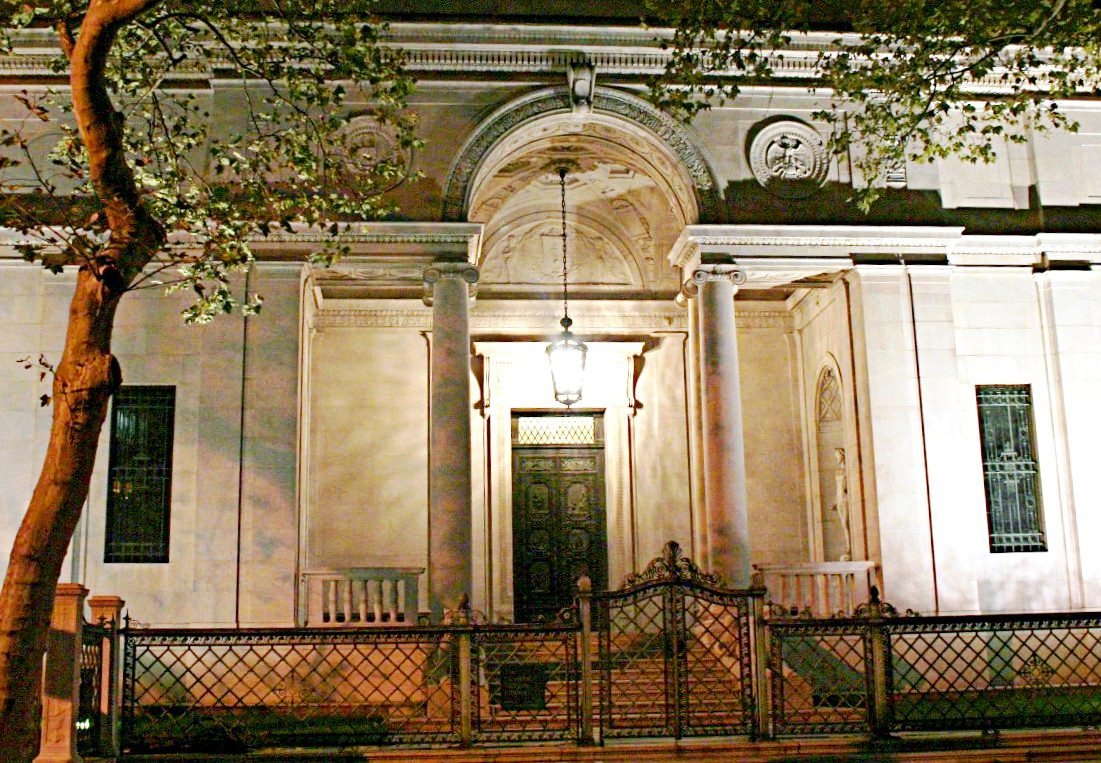
The Morgan Library & Museum, where Griswold was a curator and later director, pictured in 2006.

Griswold first worked at the Metropolitan Museum of Art in New York City from 1988 to 1995, where he cataloged Italian drawings as a curator of drawings and prints. From 1995 to 2001, he was the Charles W. Engelhard Curator at the Pierpont Morgan Library and managed its department of drawings and prints. He oversaw the creation of the museum's Drawing Study Center and organized its first major exhibition of 20th-century art and acclaimed exhibitions of the collections of Pierre Matisse and the Hermitage and Pushkin Museums. From 1996 to 2001, Griswold was an associate editor of Master Drawings, a periodical that primarily covers drawings in America and Europe from the fourteenth-century onward.

In 2001, Griswold joined the J. Paul Getty Museum in Los Angeles, California. As its associate director, he worked with the museum's six curatorial departments. In collaboration with Peggy Fogelman, the museum's assistant director for education and interpretation, he worked on projects such as a family space and the expansion of museum's education programs. After the sudden resignation of director Deborah Gribbon, Griswold became interim director of the Getty Museum in 2004. In 2005, he was selected as the director of the Minneapolis Institute of Art (Mia), succeeding Evan Mauer.

== Administrative positions ==
When Griswold became director of the Mia in 2005, the museum was nearing completion of a $113 million expansion designed by American architect Michael Graves. In his tenure, he worked to complete the museum's expansion, oversee the installation of more than thirty of its galleries, and organize a funding campaign supporting the museum's endowment. He was later named to the Ordre des Arts et des Lettres for his work with the French Regional & American Museum Exchange while Mia director. In 2007, the Morgan Library & Museum announced its intention to name Griswold as its director.

Griswold returned to the Morgan in 2008 to direct the museum. There, he oversaw the expansion and diversification of the Morgan's collections, exhibitions, and curatorial departments. Previously, the museum's collection mainly covered Western art before 1900. In an effort to make the museum more relevant to younger audiences, Griswold expanded the museum's drawings department and added a photography department, appointing Princeton University Art Museum curator Joel Smith as the museum's first photography curator in 2012. He oversaw the installation of temporary sculptures by artists such as Mark di Suvero and Xu Bing and presented exhibitions of contemporary art. He also initiated the digitization of over fifteen thousand works that comprised the museum's collection of Old Master drawings. Four years after a renovation and expansion of the museum designed by Renzo Piano, he preceded over a $4.5 million project that restored the McKim building that originally housed the museum.

=== Cleveland Museum of Art ===
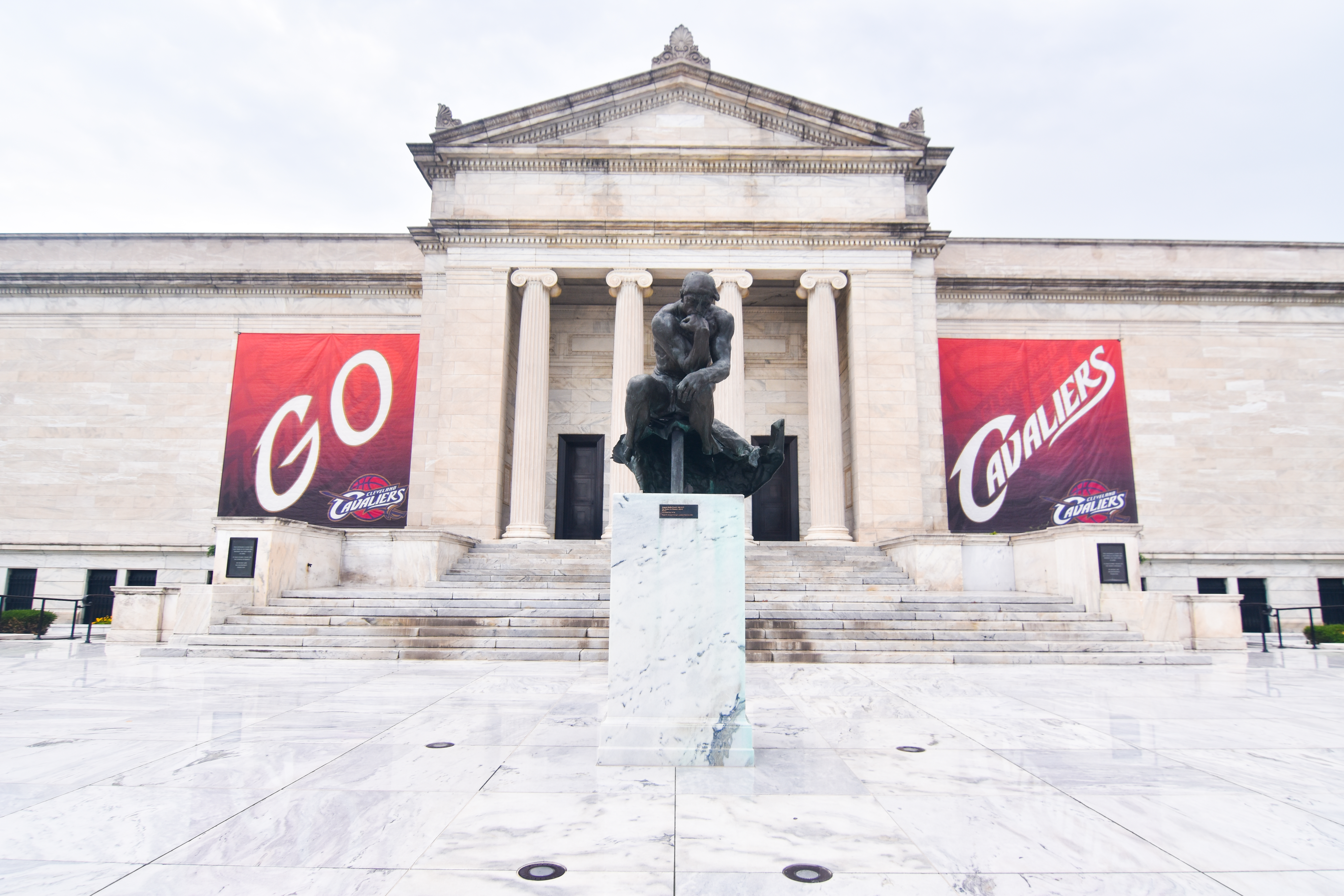
Griswold has directed the Cleveland Museum of Art (pictured in 2015) since 2014.

The Cleveland Museum of Art named Griswold their ninth director in May 2014. His appointment followed the completion of an eight-year $320 million renovation and expansion designed by Uruguayan architect Rafael Viñoly which increased the museum's size by fifty-one percent. Griswold commented on the circumstances preceding his appointment in a 2017 interview with arts journalist Lee Rosenbaum:

I came to Cleveland after a period of repeated changes in the director's office over a number of years... I had incurred a real moral obligation and to serve that institution [the Cleveland Museum of Art] for a good, long period of time, and to break the cycle of departures. It wouldn't be right to consider anything else right now.

After becoming director, Griswold filled vacancies left by curators during or in the aftermath of the directorship of his predecessor, David Franklin. In 2016, he coordinated with museum staff to produce events and exhibitions for a celebration of the museum's centennial. In 2017, his tenure as director was extended through 2024. In 2018, the museum announced an initiative aimed at growing and diversifying its audience and eliminating "barriers for historically underrepresented groups in every aspect of the museum's operations".

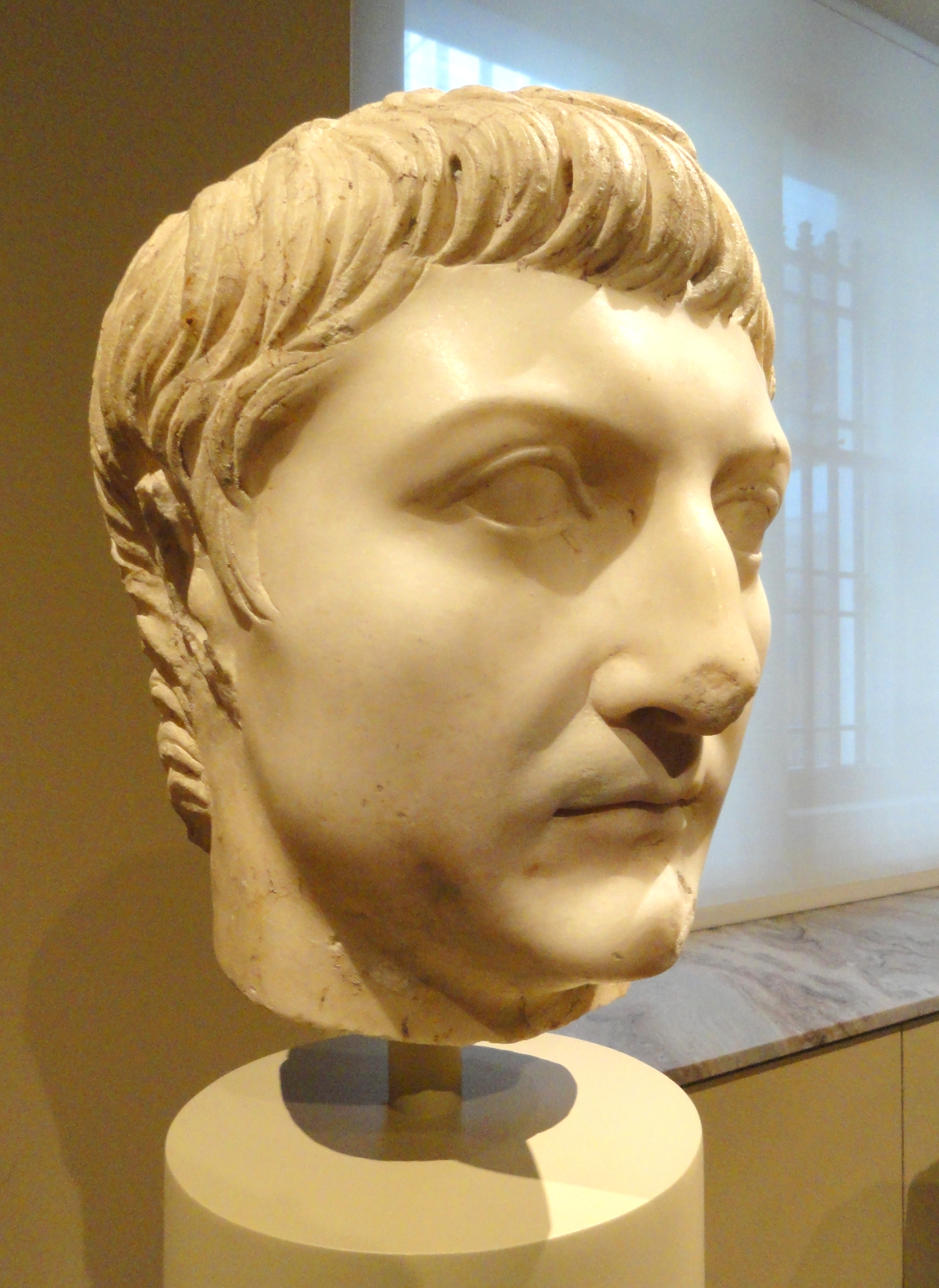
This marble portrait head of Drusus Julius Caesar was acquired by the Cleveland Museum of Art in 2012 and returned to Italy in 2017.

In two instances, the museum discovered the questionable provenance of objects in its collection, following research by staff members. These objects were a tenth-century Cambodian sculpture of Hanuman and an ancient Roman portrait of Drusus Julius Caesar, both purchased by the museum in good faith. Griswold led negotiations with the governments of Italy and Cambodia that resulted in the return of the objects to Cambodia and Italy. The resolution of the situation with the Cambodian government in 2015 also resulted in the museum obtaining a fragment required in the reconstruction of a Krishna statue. Griswold was awarded a medal of the Royal Order of Sahametrei following the exchange with Cambodia. The Cleveland Arts Prize awarded him their inaugural Barbara Robinson Prize in 2018, citing his "proactive approach to returning undocumented antiquities to their rightful origin."

In 2019, Griswold announced that the museum had released more than thirty thousand images of its works and data for 61,500 works from its collection into the public domain as part of its open access initiative. In 2020, Griswold announced temporary staffing reductions due to the COVID-19 pandemic. In 2023, museum trustees extended his tenure, originally set to end in 2024, through early 2027.

== Personal life ==
Griswold lives with his partner, Christopher Malstead, who has worked for Wells Fargo.
