= Iron Column (sculpture) =

Public sculpture in Atlanta, Georgia

- Interactive map of Iron Column
- Location: Eastside Trail, Atlanta, Georgia, United States
- Coordinates: 33.766042°N 84.360088°W
- Designer: Phil Proctor
- Material: Iron
- Height: 23 feet (7.0 m)
- Weight: 26,000 pounds (12,000 kg)
- Dedicated date: August 2013

Iron Column is a public sculpture in Atlanta, Georgia, United States. Located on the Eastside Trail near the Historic Fourth Ward Skatepark, the sculpture was installed in 2013. The piece, designed by Phil Proctor, is made of repurposed railroad artifacts.

== History ==
In December 2012, the Atlanta Beltline requested proposals for a railroad-themed piece of public art as part of their Art on the Atlanta Beltline exhibit. The Beltline offered up to $20,000 for the piece (covered through a donation from the Georgia Chapter of the International Interior Design Association) and in total received over 20 applications, with Phil Proctor's submission being chosen. Proctor's sculpture, Iron Column, was installed on the BeltLine's Eastside Trail near the Historic Fourth Ward Skatepark in August 2013. In April 2014, it was made a permanent installation on the Beltline.

== Design ==
The sculpture is made of repurposed railroad materials, including pieces of spikes, switches, and tracks. It is designed to resemble a Corinthian column, which references the columns on the façade of Atlanta Union Station, a railroad station in the city that was demolished in 1972. The sculpture has a height of 23 feet (7.0 m) and weighs 26,000 pounds (12,000 kg).

== See also ==
- 2013 in art
