= Ashes to Answers =

Memorial in Washington, D.C., U.S.

- Artist: Austin Weishel, www.austinweishel.com
- Year: 2013
- Type: Sculpture
- Medium: Bronze
- Subject: Firefighter Art
- Dimensions: Life-Size, 6.3ft tall
- Location: Washington, D.C., United States; 38.897152°N 77.019168°W
- Website: austinweishel.com

Ashes to Answers is an outdoor 2013 sculpture by Austin Weishel, installed at Fifth and F streets NW in Washington, D.C., in the United States. The work serves as a monument to arson dogs.

== See also ==
- 2013 in art
