= Statue of Bill Russell =

Statue in Boston, Massachusetts, U.S.

- Artist: Ann Hirsch
- Subject: Bill Russell
- Location: Boston, Massachusetts, U.S.; 42°21′35.3″N 71°3′27.5″W

A statue of former professional basketball player Bill Russell is a bronze sculpture by American artist Ann Hirsch is installed outside Boston's City Hall, in the U.S. state of Massachusetts. The bronze sculpture was unveiled in 2013, and subsequent statues have been added to the memorial.

== See also ==
- 2013 in art
