= Deborah Turbeville =

American photographer

- Turbeville in 1987
- Born: Deborah Lou Turbeville; July 6, 1932; Stoneham, Massachusetts
- Died: October 24, 2013 (aged 81); New York, New York
- Known for: Photography

Deborah Lou Turbeville (July 6, 1932 – October 24, 2013) was an American fashion photographer. Although she started out as a fashion editor at Harper's Bazaar, she became a photographer in the 1970s.

Her photographs appeared in numerous publications and fashion advertisements, including ads for Bloomingdale's, Bruno Magli, Nike, Ralph Lauren and Macy's.

== Early life and education ==
She was born in 1932 in Stoneham, Massachusetts, into a wealthy family in New England that desired to be both distinguished and isolated, but paradoxically suffered from this isolation.

Deborah's mother and aunts inherited a large house from her paternal grandfather, isolated in the periphery of Boston. Deborah's father, who was from Texas, also lived in the house. This familial community, which cultivated its members' intellectual superiority through frequent trips to Boston's opera and cinemas, also suffered from this exile in the suburbs.

Deborah had an older brother called Tom, who lived in New York on Riverside Drive at the same time Deborah was living there.

She was a student at Brimmer and May School in the Bay of Boston, and has always cited as her first sources of inspiration the narrow cobble streets, Louisburg Square, snow and tinted windows.

In addition to her family home on the outskirts of Boston, Turbeville also spent her summers in their vacation home in Ogunquit in Maine.

== Photographic style ==
According to Turbeville, her work was deeply inspired by her childhood: "I am like a child, I must manage it every hour of every day."

Turbeville's photographs are recognizable by their grain, by their colors of pastel, sepia, or black and white, and by the image blurring. She sometimes reworks her shots by scraping or taping them with the help of her assistant and collaborator, Sharon Schuster. According to Pete Silverton, these photographs are "consciously damaged goods." Furthermore, according to Turbeville, "I destroy the image after having created it (...) Erasing a bit in such a manner that it is never completely there..." Or: "The idea of disintegration is really at the heart of my work." This work of alteration is one of the elements that make Turbeville an artist, as she provokes a reflection on the medium, and the medium is in itself significant. Her images, "scraped, twisted, erased, damaged artificially to give the impression of old clichés, contradict the technical perfection that even an amateur photographer can get these days. Turbeville exposes the lie that with technique and determination an artist who seeks to create imaginative content resonates ambiguities." "Yes, the images' apparent stillness hides an undercurrent of violence (...) This violence is reinforced by the artist in her work: she violates her own images."

She is widely credited with adding a darker, more brooding element to fashion photography, beginning in the early 1970s – she, Guy Bourdin and Helmut Newton changed it from traditional, well-lit images into something much more "edgy" looking. However, unlike the "urban erotic underworld" portrayed by her contemporaries, Turbeville's aesthetic tended towards "dreamy and mysterious," a delicate female gaze. She was the only woman and only American among this trio. In 2009, Women's Wear Daily wrote that Turbeville transformed "fashion photography into avant-garde art."

== Subjects ==
During the 1970s, fashion photography moved more towards sexual provocation and tended to become, according to Nancy Hall-Duncan, "a subdivision of the culture of pornography." Turbeville took its misty atmospheres and combined them with models that communicated neither between one another nor with the viewer. Nancy Hall-Duncan notes that these women seemed "locked in their solitude," an impression reinforced "by lazy, soft poses." And, she added: "In the broadest sense, Turbeville's photographs reflected the psychological collapse of the modern world, but people with whom Turbeville recognized her failure to communicate perfectly. She was even scared of them, as she could not have the smallest preconceived idea of them. "I am often scared, of people. This is found in the photos I take: almost the feeling of humiliation or embarrassment. The young women lower their eyes, or look elsewhere, they cannot look the lens in the face. And I, I cannot force them to look directly in the lens, or make a face like everything is great and it's truly cool!" Indeed, in the collective book Women on Women, about women photographing other women, she wrote that in her photos, "there is the gnawing feeling that something is wrong. My work is not complete if it does not contain some vestige of this frustration in the final prints."

Thus, in her work in fashion photography, she tried to avoid a "stereotypical ideal" and glamour: "It wasn't the perfectly beautiful girl who made me want to take photos, but the girl with an intrigue in her face, with a profoundness below the surface." Accordingly, the models themselves take precedence over the "innocuous, -hued separates of the seventies and eighties," despite their averted gazes.

== Death ==
Turbeville died from lung cancer at St. Luke's-Roosevelt Hospital Center in Manhattan on October 24, 2013, at the age of 81.

== Publications ==
=== Publications by Turbeville ===
- Wallflower. Congreve, 1979.
- Unseen Versailles. Doubleday, 1981. Introduction by Louis Auchincloss.
- Les Amoureuses du Temps Pass. Parco, 1985.
- Photographers Contemporains I. Centre Georges Pompidou/M.N.A.M., 1986.
- Newport Remembered. Harry Abrams, 1994. Introduction by Louis Auchincloss.
- The Voyage of the Virgen Maria Candelaria. Parco, 1996.
- Studio St. Petersburg. Bulfinch, 1997.
- Past Imperfect. Steidl, Germany 2010. ISBN 978-3-86521-452-2.
- Casa No. Name. Rizzoli, 2009.
- Comme des Garçons 1981. 2017

=== Publications on Turbeville ===
- Yearbook of Photography. Time-Life, 1976.
- Women By Women. Aurum, 1978.
- Alexander Liberman The World of American Vogue: Fifty Years of Fashion.
- Hall-Duncan, Nancy. The History of Fashion Photography.
- The Idealizing Vision. Aperture, 1990.
- Wedding Days, Images of Matrimony. H2O/Graystone, Tokyo, 1996.
