= Sacha Sosno =

French sculptor and painter

- Born: Alexandre Joseph Sosnowsky; 18 March 1937; Marseille, France
- Died: 3 December 2013 (aged 76); Monaco
- Known for: Sculptor, painter

Alexandre Joseph Sosnowsky (18 March 1937 – 3 December 2013), better known by the name Sacha Sosno, was an internationally renowned French sculptor and painter. Working most of the time in Nice, in his last decades Sosno achieved international recognition for his monumental outdoor sculptures in Côte d'Azur, France. Along with Yves Klein, Arman and Cesar, he was part of the New Realist (Nouveau réalisme) movement. Sosno had a singular artistic approach: the concept of obliteration. His sculptures are masked by empty or full space, inviting the viewer to use his own imagination.

== Biography ==
"Sosno, Grande Venus, 1984

Sosno was born in Marseille. His father was Estonian and his mother was French. Sosno spent his childhood in Riga, Latvia. During World War II, his family managed to escape to Switzerland and later to France. He began painting in 1948 when he was inspired by his neighbour Henri Matisse but stopped in 1956. In 1958 he studied in Paris (political science & oriental languages) following courses at the Law Faculty and at the Cinema Institute at the Sorbonne. In 1961 went back to Nice and founded the magazine "Sud Communications" (Eng: Southern Communications), in which he then published his first theory of the "School of Nice". Shortly afterwards, he began his long friendship with Martial Raysse. In the 1960s after a term of military service in Toulouse and stints as a war reporter in Ireland, Bangladesh and Biafra, Sosno returned to painting. In 1974 he sold his art studio in Paris in order so that was free to cross the Atlantic by sailboat. Three years later, Sosno returned to France to make his first sculpture, "Obliterated Cars".

In 1983 Sosno was the subject of a one-man show at the Musée des Beaux-Arts de Nice. Then in the year following he had his first one-man show in the United States at the Aldrich Museum of Contemporary Art in Ridgefield, Connecticut. IN 1986 The Galerie Beaubourg in Paris commissioned a piece from the artist. Between 1986 and 1988 Sosno developed several projects which brought together sculpture and architecture, including the Hotel Elysée Palace (today running under Marriott flag and named AC Hotel Nice) with architect Georges Margarita, a 28-meter high work, which incorporates a 19-meter high bronze and 420 tons of granite. In 1989 and 1990 he had four one-man shows in the U.S.: in the Floridian cities of Miami, West Palm Beach, Sarasota and Tampa. Then in the nineteen nineties the artist set up his workshop on the hills of Nice where he planted vines and olive trees. In the last decades many international exhibitions of his work were stage in nations such as France, Russia, China and Italy. Sosnp's most recognizable work remains the "Tête Carrée" (square head building) library in Nice, France which he completed in 2002 in collaboration with architects Yves Bayard and Francis Chapus.

== Style ==
Sosno's work has been termed l'art d'oblitér or the ‘art of obliteration’ as a result of his idiosyncratic voids or solids added to an artwork, which obliterate or distort the full picture or figure. Thus giving the viewer the task of imagining what is absent: "I only do 50% of the work; other people have to finish creating the sculpture". His pieces frequently display either the absence of material or an obstructing addition. For example, in "Tete aux quatre vents femme", Sosno removed sections of the bronze work, leaving holes where the face, ears and back of the head ought to be. This requires the audience to use its imagination in constructing the full image. Sosno's creative work is self-sufficient, soaring and martial, cultural, a protest.

== Architecture (inhabited sculpture) ==
Sosno possessed a passion for architecture. He believed architecture must be imbued with the artistic. In 2000 Sosno started to work on Tête Carrée (The Square Head), a 26-meter high monumental sculpture – the Central Library in Nice with architects Yves Bayard and Francis Chapuis, financed by the Ministry of Culture, the Regional Council, the County Council and the City of Nice. One year later the installation of the aluminium structure began. When the work was completed in 2002 it became the first inhabited monumental sculpture in the world, the first construction entirely in aluminum and the first building shaped and raised thanks to naval techniques.
