= Whitman-Walker Health =

Non-profit health center in Washington, D.C., U.S.

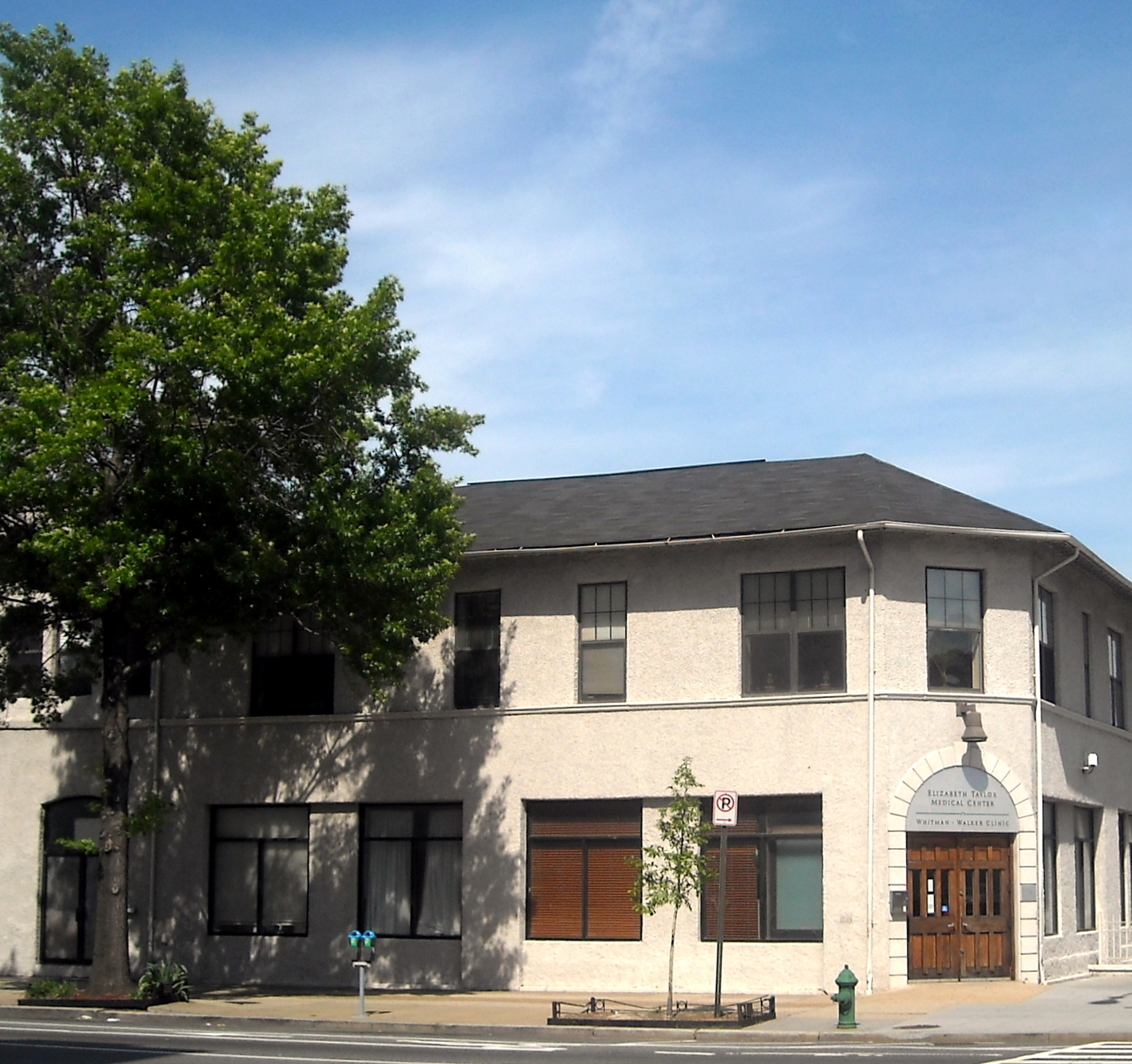
- WWH's Elizabeth Taylor Medical Center
- Abbreviation: WWH
- Established: November 1973; 52 years ago
- Type: non-profit community health center
- Purpose: HIV/AIDS healthcare LGBT healthcare
- Location: Washington, D.C., U.S.
- Website: www.whitman-walker.org
- Formerly called: Whitman-Walker Clinic

Whitman-Walker Health (WWH), formerly Whitman-Walker Clinic, is a non-profit community health center in the Washington, D.C. metropolitan area with a special expertise in HIV/AIDS healthcare and LGBT healthcare. Chartered as an affirming health center for the gay and lesbian community in 1978, Whitman-Walker was one of the first responders to the HIV/AIDS epidemic in D.C. and became a leader in HIV/AIDS education, prevention, diagnosis and treatment. In recent years, Whitman-Walker has expanded its services to include primary healthcare services, a stronger focus on queer women's care and youth services.

WWH is named for poet Walt Whitman (a former D.C. resident) and Dr. Mary Edwards Walker, a noted Civil War–era physician in the District and women's rights activist.

== Operations ==
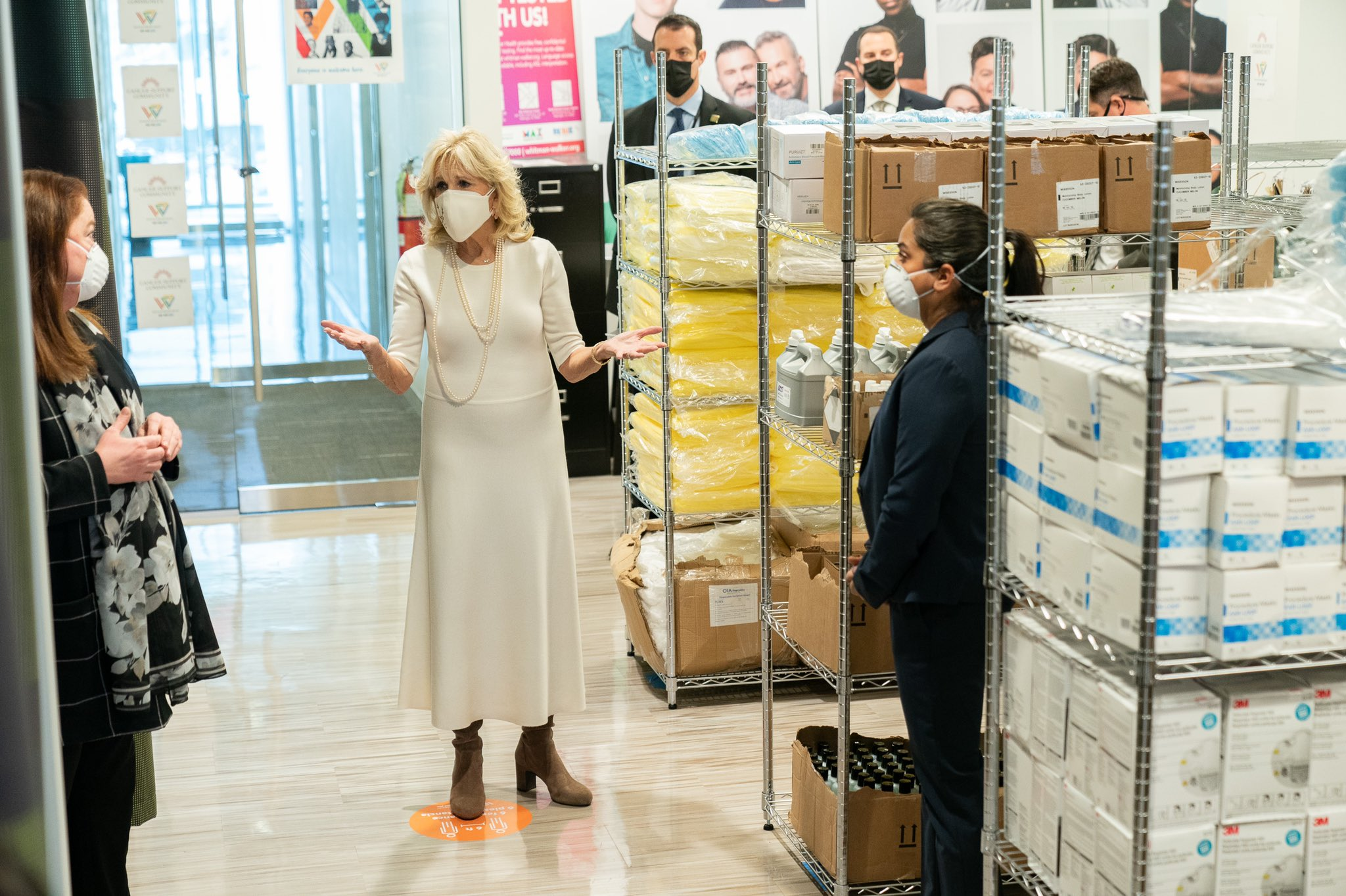
First Lady Jill Biden visiting a Whitman-Walker facility in Washington, D.C., in January 2021

Through three sites in D.C., WWH provides a number of health care services to the D.C. metro area. They include primary medical and dental care; mental health and addictions counseling and treatment; HIV education, prevention and testing; legal services; medical adherence case management; a pharmacy open to all; and more.

Whitman-Walker's newest medical facility is at 1525 14th Street, NW. This 42,000 square foot building opened in May 2015. It houses 28 medical exam rooms, nine dental chairs, a street-facing pharmacy, behavioral health therapy rooms and more.

Administration continues to operate out of the Elizabeth Taylor Medical Center located at 1701 14th Street, NW in the Logan Circle neighborhood of Washington, D.C. WWH also provides primary medical services, dental care and legal services out of its Max Robinson Center in the primarily African-American neighborhood of Anacostia in Southeast D.C.

Annually, WWH produces The Walk to End HIV, formerly AIDS Walk Washington, which is held in October, and is the largest community-based fundraising event for WWH's HIV services.

== History ==
=== 1970s ===
Whitman-Walker was founded in November 1973 as the Gay Men's VD Clinic, part of the Washington Free Clinic. The VD Clinic operated in the basement of the Georgetown Lutheran Church with an all-volunteer staff. In 1976, after receiving complaints from the church, the VD Clinic split off as an independent organization and hired its first full-time staff.

Whitman-Walker Health was chartered as "Whitman-Walker Clinic" by the government of the District of Columbia on January 13, 1978. The D.C. Department of Human Resources provided WWH $15,000, the first city funds to support the organization. In October, Whitman-Walker Clinic opened a new, rented facility at 1606 17th Street, NW.

=== 1980s ===
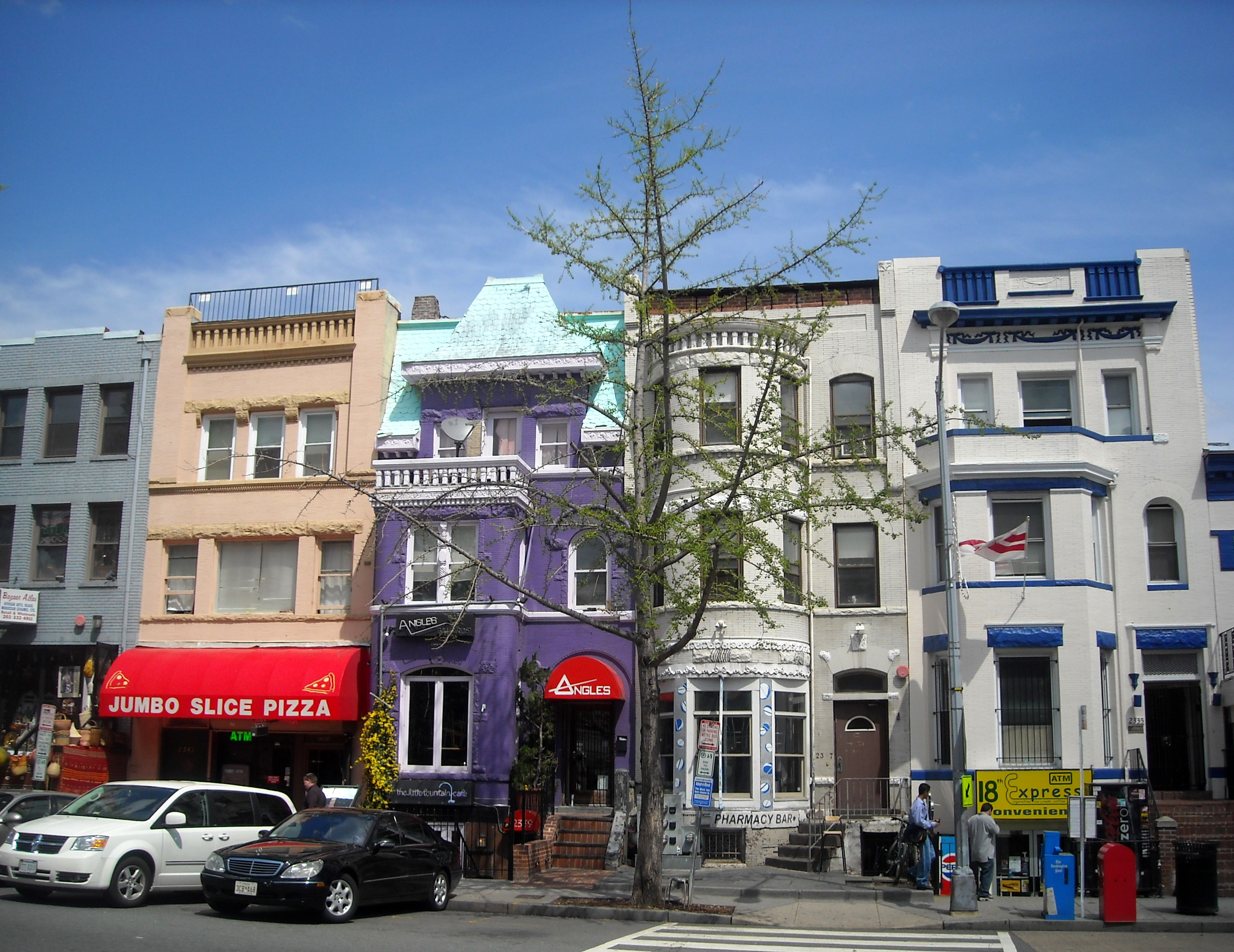
From 1980 to 1987, Whitman-Walker Clinic was located at 2335 18th Street, N.W., visible on the far right-hand side.

In 1980, a financial crisis threatened the clinic. The administrator resigned, programs were eliminated and the clinic moved into a more affordable space on 18th Street in Adams Morgan.

In 1981, Jim Graham became the clinic's president and Larry Medley became the third WWC administrator. Whitman-Walker hired its first board-certified medical technologist for an in-house laboratory offering testing for various sexually transmitted diseases.

On June 5, 1981, the Centers for Disease Control and Prevention's Morbidity and Mortality Weekly Report featured an account of five young gay men in Los Angeles with cases of rare pneumonia. This was the first medical report on what would famously come to be known as HIV/AIDS.

In 1983, as AIDS began taking a larger toll, WWC assumed a leadership role in fighting the epidemic. The clinic launched its AIDS Education Fund to provide up-to-date information, counseling and direct services to people with AIDS; the Buddy program to help people living with AIDS was started; an AIDS information hotline (which was the recipient of the first D.C. contract awarded for AIDS services) was created; and an HIV/AIDS prevention advertising campaign was launched. To support these new programs, WWC benefited from D.C.'s first AIDS fundraiser which raised $4,400.

On April 4, 1983, WWC presented the first D.C. AIDS Forum at the Lisner Auditorium at George Washington University. The forum distributed AIDS prevention information and catered to the 1,200 men in attendance. A second AIDS forum for people of color was held on September 28.

In 1984, WWC opened its AIDS Evaluation Unit, the first gay, community-based medical unit in the U.S. devoted to the evaluation and diagnosis of AIDS symptoms. Fifty-five patients were treated the first year and 50 percent had AIDS.

The first support group for people with AIDS (PWA) began. Sunnye Sherman, a WWC client, stepped forward as one of the first women openly living with AIDS in the nation. She acted as a strong support system for other people with AIDS and educated the community on her experience.

Whitman-Walker opened the Robert N. Schwartz, M.D., house, the city's first home for people with AIDS, in 1985. The second house opened in December.

Later that year, WWC began anonymous testing for what was then called HTLV-III, but is now called HIV. Whitman-Walker became the largest testing site in the region.

The AIDS treatment center rapidly expanded and became a full-time clinic in 1986.

Through 1986, WWC continued to expand HIV/AIDS services. The housing program grew with the opening of four houses. Whitman-Walker also opened a food bank and hired its first full-time lawyer to provide clients with legal services related to AIDS discrimination. These services largely consisted of wills, powers of attorney and disability entitlements.

In 1987, WWC opened a dental clinic for patients with HIV/AIDS, one of only three in the country at the time. Whitman-Walker also opened the Scott Harper House for gay men and lesbians recovering from substance abuse, a facility still open to this day.

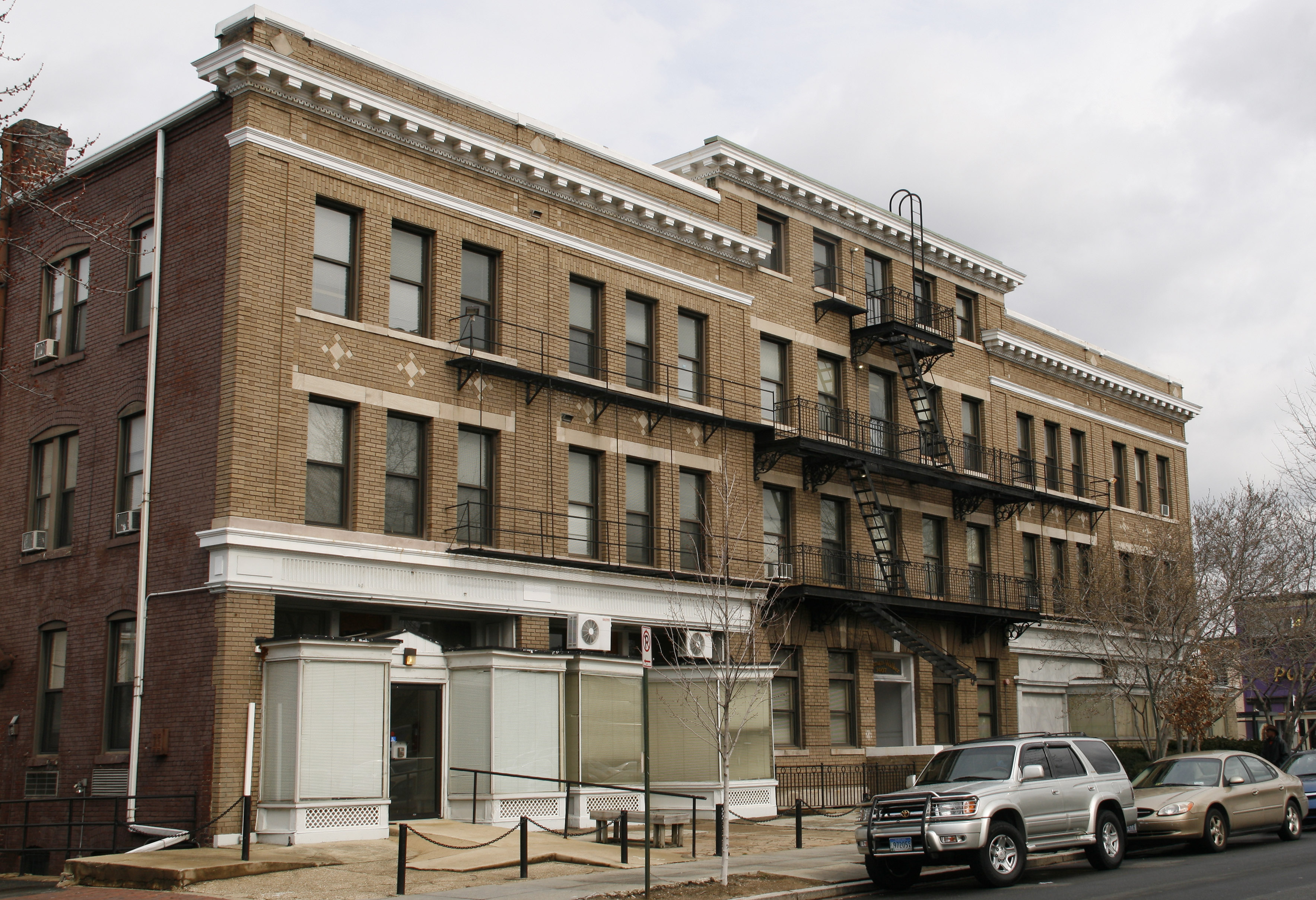
The Whitman-Walker Clinic's former medical facility located at 1407 S Street, NW

Also in 1987, WWC moved to a larger building, located at 1407 S Street, NW (formerly the Evelyn Towers Apartments). This facility would operate as the organization's headquarters for more than two decades. Whitman-Walker was able to purchase the building in 1988. At this time, D.C. Mayor Marion Barry and the Eugene and Agnes E. Meyer Foundation were the clinic's primary financial supporters. Simultaneously, individual contributions from the local LGBTQ community made up about half of the organization's income.

Whitman-Walker brought the first AIDS Walk to D.C. in 1987.

Whitman-Walker encountered resistance when it began to offer services through the Northern Virginia AIDS Project in 1987. Although the clinic had started its Northern Virginia AIDS Project in 1987, it was unable to find space for its operations for some time. In one case, the clinic was denied housing by a landlord who allegedly did so out of fear and/or homophobia. The landlord claimed the clinic had not met certain leasing and payment requirements, and a judge agreed. Whitman-Walker eventually found other space and opened its Northern Virginia AIDS (NOVAA) Project office in Arlington, offering case management and education services.

In 1988, WWC expanded its services throughout the D.C. metropolitan region, providing access to new HIV treatments an opening an on-site, at-cost pharmacy.

=== 1990s ===
The Lesbian Services and Mental Health Services programs had full-time, paid staff.

In December 1990, WWC dedicated the Stewart B. McKinney House, its first house specifically for families with HIV.

Passage of the Ryan White CARE Act in 1991 led to the infusion of federal grant funds, helping to reinforce the clinic's finances. Whitman-Walker expanded to include a transportation service, interpreting services, a Spanish-speaking physician and a full-time dentist.

In June 1991, WWC began construction of a new outpatient care center for people with AIDS. The center was dedicated as the Bill Austin Day Treatment and Care Center. Then-First Lady, Barbara Bush, made a highly publicized visit to open the Austin Center.

In 1992, WWC opened its Max Robinson Center in Southeast D.C. (2301 Martin Luther King Jr. Avenue, SE) and Whitman-Walker Clinic of Southern Maryland (7676 New Hampshire Avenue in Silver Spring). The Lesbian Health Clinic also opened and offered a wide range of gynecological and wellness services to lesbians and bisexual women in the region.

The clinic's expansion efforts caused conflict with some other service groups. For example, in 1993 WWC applied for a million-dollar HIV/AIDS grant and competed for the grant against a coalition of primarily African-American service and outreach groups for it. The clinic won the grant, angering some community leaders and activists who felt the city had discriminated against black organizations in favor of the white-led Clinic. Local community leaders also opposed the clinic's expanding housing program, fearing for the health and safety of their communities.

Whitman-Walker adopted oral testing for HIV in 1993 before most major AIDS clinics in the U.S. That same year, WWC dedicated the Elizabeth Taylor Medical Center, designed to provide holistic care to patients with all service needs met under one roof, named in honor of actress and AIDS activist Dame Elizabeth Taylor. Taylor attended the building's opening ceremony.

Further expansion came in 1994 as the Northern Virginia AIDS (NOVAA) Project of Whitman-Walker Clinic grew and was formally renamed Whitman-Walker Clinic of Northern Virginia. The HIV testing and counseling program expanded to Max Robinson Center.

In 1995, the clinic established a program under which patients could sell their life insurance policies to the organization in exchange for an annuity. Critics claimed that Whitman-Walker would benefit only if its patients died, making this a conflict of interest.

The 1997 AIDS Walk Washington was the organization's most successful Walk ever. About 25,000 people helped raise $1.7 million.

At the beginning of 1998, Washington AIDS Partnership awarded WWC with a $42,000 grant to expand the clinic's Needle Exchange Program. The program conducted one-to-one syringe exchanges. The program counseled drug users, administered HIV tests and significantly reduced the transmission of HIV. Unfortunately, later that year, Congress passed a District budget with restrictions on federal funding for organizations conducting needle exchange programs. In response, an independent corporation was incorporated to fill the need: Prevention Works, Inc.

In early February 1998, WWC Legal Services and Lambda Legal Defense and Education Fund filed an amicus brief in the U.S. Supreme Court Case of Bragdon v. Abbott, a case of discrimination by a dentist to his patient who was HIV-positive. On June 25, 1998, the Supreme Court decided in favor of the patient. With the successful use of the Americans with Disabilities Act (ADA), this case made it harder for doctors to justify discrimination against HIV-positive patients.

Jim Graham, long-time executive director of WWC, resigned at the end of 1998 to serve on the D.C. City Council representing Ward One. Graham's replacement was Elliott Johnson, who came to the clinic from the Los Angeles County Health Department. Johnson briefly served as executive director.

In 1999, the counseling and testing program went mobile with a van that provided testing at health fairs, festivals and bars. Whitman-Walker more than tripled its testing rates through this outreach. This program is still in effect today and supports the 10,000 free HIV tests that WWH administers annually.

=== 2000s ===
Cornelius Baker, an HIV-positive civil rights and HIV activist, was selected as executive director in January 2000.

Also in 2000, WWC renovated Elizabeth Taylor Medical Center to place nearly all client services under one roof.

That same year, the Rev. Jesse Jackson received an HIV test at Max Robinson Center as part of a campaign to encourage African-Americans to get tested.

Whitman-Walker played a fundamental role in organizing the National Coalition for LGBT Health along with 50 other local, state and national organizations. Cornelius Baker was named one of the first co-chairs of the Coalition.

As the HIV/AIDS epidemic entered the 21st Century, WWC was faced with a changing epidemic and difficult decisions. With improved medical treatment, HIV/AIDS patients began to live longer and required more services for longer periods of time. This change put an additional financial strain on the clinic as it continued providing services to a growing patient base.

Simultaneously, funding problems began to beset the clinic. Funding for the federal Ryan White CARE Act was frozen at its 2001 level for several years. Major fundraising events, such as the AIDS Ride (which went bankrupt) and the AIDS Walk (which saw reduced attendance in 2000 and 2001), were not successful.

In 2003, the clinic began offering OraQuick's rapid oral HIV test, which gave results in 20 minutes. Whitman-Walker also instituted a sliding fee scale so that those who could afford to contribute to their care could do so.

2004 brought both good and bad news for WWC. The CDC and CareFirst BlueCross BlueShield helped the clinic observe World AIDS Day, December 1, by providing funds for two new mobile HIV testing units. However, financial problems lead to the Schwartz Housing Program's closing and the transition of all housing clients to other providers.

Cornelius Baker resigned as executive director of WWC in December 2004, telling the Washington Blade the clinic's financial difficulties had negatively impacted his health and citing other personal reasons for leaving.

In 2005, WWC opened medical and support services for the transgender community. Services include gynecological exams; STD screenings; chest and breast exams and self-exam instruction; hormone therapy; and mental health services.

In May 2005, WWC faced its biggest financial problem when it was unable to make payroll for the first time in its history. This cash crunch was brought on by the ongoing freeze in Ryan White CARE Act funding levels, reduced donations through special events and late payments from the D.C. government for services rendered.

At the same time, the clinic discovered it had mistakenly overcharged funders for laboratory expenses. After an internal investigation confirmed the error, WWC immediately stopped billing for these services and notified all pertinent funders. This change further impacted revenue.

In early June, the clinic announced that financial difficulties would force it to close several programs, including the Food Bank and the clinic's sites in Virginia and Maryland. Almost immediately, small donors, local governments and corporate partners offered financial support. The District of Columbia provided a one-time grant of $3.2 million. Government entities in Virginia pledged $800,000 to keep Whitman-Walker of Northern Virginia open through December 2006.

These funds enabled the clinic to keep open the food bank and its residential addictions programs. However, Whitman-Walker Clinic of Suburban Maryland closed on September 30, 2005.

In late 2005, the clinic's board of directors adopted a raft of changes to ensure the future viability of WWC. Those changes included:

- Making Whitman-Walker a community health center that would provide health care to the entire community, regardless of HIV status, sexual orientation or gender identity. [43]
- Adopting a new business model to reduce dependence on government funding and private donations that expanded primary medical care services and brought in more clients with private insurance, Medicaid or Medicare. The new model also streamlined the access process for new clients and provided services at more convenient times for clients.
- Reducing the size of the board by half and requiring that a majority of board members be patients of the clinic.

The expansion of services began in early 2006 and included a greater push for the clinic to accept more private and public insurance plans. The clinic also created a public benefits unit to screen new and existing patients for insurance and to enroll them in public assistance programs for which they qualified, such as Medicare, Medicaid and DC Healthcare Alliance.

On March 13, 2006, the WWC Board of Directors announced it was hiring Donald Blanchon to take over as executive director on May 1. Blanchon was formerly chief executive officer of Maryland Physicians Care (a managed care health plan in Maryland) and vice president for Medicaid and Medicare programs at Schaller Anderson (a medical management firm). Blanchon quickly announced his support for the Board's turnaround plan.

A week later, WWC announced it would sell its two properties on 14th Street and the Max Robinson Center in Anacostia in seeking to build new, larger medical treatment facilities in the two respective areas by 2009. However, these plans were ultimately shelved due to the downturn in the real estate market in the area.

In 2007, the Washington Free Clinic closed its doors due to financial problems. Whitman-Walker hired the staff of the Washington Free Clinic, allowing WWC to further expand the medical services it offered.

Over the next three years, WWC continued expanding its services to the community, through adding gynecological services, Hepatitis A and B specialty care, medical adherence services, and the hiring of additional providers.

In March 2007, the Bureau of Primary Health Care, part of the federal Health Resources and Services Administration (HRSA), gave WWC a "Federally Qualified Health Center Look-Alike" designation. The designation is only awarded to clinics that provide care to medically underserved communities and meet other stringent requirements. The benefits of this status include a higher Medicaid reimbursement rate.

Finally in 2007, WWC purchased and installed a state-of-the-art, computerized patient record-keeping system.

On January 11, 2008, Blanchon said the clinic had almost completed its transformation into a primary care medical organization. Whitman-Walker hired Dr. Raymond Martins, assistant clinical professor of medicine at the Georgetown University School of Medicine, as its new chief medical officer, purchased and outsourced its financial management department. Although WWC laid off an unspecified number of employees due to the outsourcing, Blanchon said the clinic was still the area's largest provider of HIV/AIDS education, prevention and treatment.

Whitman-Walker also began considering plans to improve and upgrade the clinic's facilities.

In June 2008, the clinic sold its long-time headquarters at 1407 S Street, NW, to The JBG Companies for $8 million and moved its administrative staff into Elizabeth Taylor Medical Center at 14th Street, NW. Whitman-Walker used the proceeds to pay off $5 million in debts stemming from mortgages on its existing buildings.

The 2008 AIDS Walk was the clinic's most successful in several years, raising $700,000. By year's end, the clinic had served about 10,000 patients, of whom 3,400 were HIV-positive.

Nonetheless, WWC continued to face financial challenges. The global economic downturn in the fall of 2008 had a tremendous impact on revenue: Government reimbursements for medical care had not kept pace with inflation, promised funding from some sources were not delivered, donations had dropped by 29 percent, sales of medical services had decreased, and the number of patients without insurance had risen. The clinic was forced to close Whitman-Walker Clinic of Northern Virginia and its BridgeBack residential addiction treatment center, and laid off 45 employees. Whitman-Walker also outsourced its pharmacy operations to Maxor National Pharmacy Services Corporation (a privately held, for-profit pharmacy management company based in Amarillo, Texas). The clinic was also forced to close its mental health telephone hotline when city funding for the program was eliminated.

After a decade of financial struggle, WWC began seeing a turnaround in the second half of 2009. By the year's end, the clinic's $4 million loss in both 2007 and 2008 had been reduced more than 80 percent to a $650,000 loss.

The turnaround was attributed to several factors:

- A nearly tripling of revenue from third party funding such as private and public insurance.
- Increased revenue from WWC's on-site pharmacy, which approached $500,000 a month by the year's end.
- An increase in patients coming to WWC for care who had insurance or were eligible to receive public benefits.
- The 2009 AIDS Walk raised $100,000 more than expected.
- The difficult decisions to cut financially unsustainable programming.

The creation of stable sources of revenue allowed WWC to decrease its dependency on government funding and private contributions, making it less vulnerable to economic downturns.

At the same time, WWC services continued to expand. Between 2006 and 2010, the clinic more than doubled the number of health care providers on staff, including specialists in gynecology, hepatitis and psychiatry.

=== 2010s ===
In early 2011, WWC announced that it had finished 2010 in the black, something it had not done in a decade. The two percent operating gain represented the third year in a row of financial progress and reflected a tremendous amount of hard work and sacrifice for WWC staff.

Whitman-Walker also saw a 30 percent increase in patients between 2009 and 2010.

In April, Whitman-Walker announced that it was changing its name to "Whitman-Walker Health" and unveiled a new logo and website.

In September, WWH completed extensive renovations of patient service areas in Elizabeth Taylor Medical Center, improving patient flow, expanding the size of the pharmacy, and bringing a new look to the lobby.

The year 2011 also brought some distinctions of merit to WWH, including the "Clinic of the Year" award from the Capital City Area Health Education Center and the Medical Society of the District of Columbia's John Benjamin Nichols Award for Outstanding Contributions to Community Health. Whitman-Walker was also named one of 27 "Leaders in LGBT Healthcare Equality" in the nation by the Human Rights Campaign Foundation.

In March 2012, WWH announced that 2011 had been a highly successful year:

- A $2.6 million operating gain, the second year in a row with a gain, marking a nearly $7 million turnaround since 2007's $4+ million loss.
- Whitman-Walker cared for 15,515 individuals, a nearly 20 percent increase over 2010. The patient base had nearly doubled since WWH began its process to become a community health center in 2006.
- One in seven patients in 2011 lived in Wards Seven and Eight—a 68 percent increase over 2010.
- The number of LGB patients had increased by 77 percent since 2006.
- The number of transgender patients had increased by 185 percent since 2006.
- Whitman-Walker administered more than 10,600 HIV tests in 2011, nine percent of all HIV tests administered in the District of Columbia, with 174 new HIV diagnoses.

Whitman-Walker marked the International AIDS Conference in July 2012 with "Return to Lisner", a community forum on HIV/AIDS held at the site of D.C.'s first AIDS forum on April 4, 1983, also organized by Whitman-Walker. The July 24th forum drew hundreds to the Lisner Auditorium to hear speakers including Jeanne White-Ginder, the mother of Ryan White.

As 2013 began, Whitman-Walker announced the construction of a new medical home set to open in 2015. The new facility would be at 1525 14th Street, NW, about two blocks south of Elizabeth Taylor Medical Center. It would be leased to WWH.

In March 2013, WWH announced that it had ended 2012 with an unaudited $2.4 million surplus. This was the third consecutive year it had finished a year in the black. Whitman-Walker also ended 2012 with high patient satisfaction rates and high quality of care indicators.

Mautner Project, the National Lesbian Health Organization, a D.C.-based nonprofit focused on the health care needs of lesbian, bisexual and transgender women, joined WWH in a collaboration in June 2013. All of Mautner Project's programs and employees became a part of WWH, allowing Mautner's existing clients greater access to more health care services.

In 2014, WWH announced the name change of its annual AIDS Walk to The Walk to End HIV. The name change "reflects a cataclysmic shift to what HIV is today – a chronic, manageable disease", said Don Blanchon at the time of the announcement. AIDS Walk Washington was the first AIDS Walk in the country to change its name and remove AIDS from the title.

2015 marked a new collaboration between the youth-serving organization Metro TeenAIDS (MTA) and WWH. Metro TeenAIDS became a part of WWH in February, maintaining all of MTA's youth services and extending WWH's service reach to young people.

In May 2015, WWH opened its state-of-the-art medical home at 1525 14th Street, NW. In comparison to Elizabeth Taylor Medical Center, the 42,000 square foot building doubled exam room space to 28, tripled dental chairs to nine and allowed for a street-facing pharmacy open to the whole community. With services spread over seven floors, the building (dubbed "1525") houses primary medical care, dental care, behavioral health, legal services, wellness programs, and HIV counseling and testing. Administration staff continues to work out of Elizabeth Taylor Medical Center, and some programs continue to be housed there.

In June, WWH announced that after the completion of a two-year planning and assessment process, its board of directors had decided to redevelop the Elizabeth Taylor Medical Center site with Streetscape via a joint venture partnership model. Whitman-Walker will be the majority owner of the joint venture and will retain major decision-making rights over key issues such as future programming/uses of the site.

=== 2020s ===
In 2025, Whitman-Walker removed all material related to transgender health care from its website in order to shield itself from potential adverse action by the Trump administration. While it continued to quietly provide such care, this was no longer reflected in outward facing materials.

== See also ==
- Healthcare in the United States
- Healthcare in Washington, D.C.
- HIV/AIDS in the United States
- Pillar of Fire, a sculpture honoring Whitman-Walker and healthcare workers
