= Soundings: A Contemporary Score =

2013 contemporary art show

"Soundings: A Contemporary Score" was a survey of new sound art exhibited at the Museum of Modern Art in 2013.

== Bibliography ==
- Beta, Andy (August 7, 2013). "The Art of Noise, Explored". Wall Street Journal. ISSN 0099-9660.
- Cappetta, Andrew (September 4, 2013). "Soundings: A Contemporary Score and The String and the Mirror". The Brooklyn Rail.
- Cotter, Holland (August 8, 2013). "Going to MoMA to See the Sounds". The New York Times. ISSN 0362-4331.
- Davidson, Justin (August 3, 2013). "Justin Davidson on the MoMA's First Sound Art Exhibition". Vulture.
- Gopnik, Blake (August 1, 2013). "Did You Hear That? It Was Art". The New York Times. ISSN 0362-4331.
- Lee, Diana SeoHyung (2013). "ArtAsiaPacific: Soundings A Contemporary Score". ArtAsiaPacific.
- Sugarman, Michael (August 15, 2013). "Go See MoMA's First Sound Art Exhibition". The FADER.
- Sullivan, Robert (August 7, 2013). "At MoMA's First-Ever Sound Art Show, It's Better to Be Seen and Heard". Vogue.
- Vogel, Carol (April 4, 2013). "Sound Art at MoMA, and Big Works at Christie's and Sotheby's". The New York Times. ISSN 0362-4331.
