= Pavel 183 =

Russian street artist (1983–2013)

P183
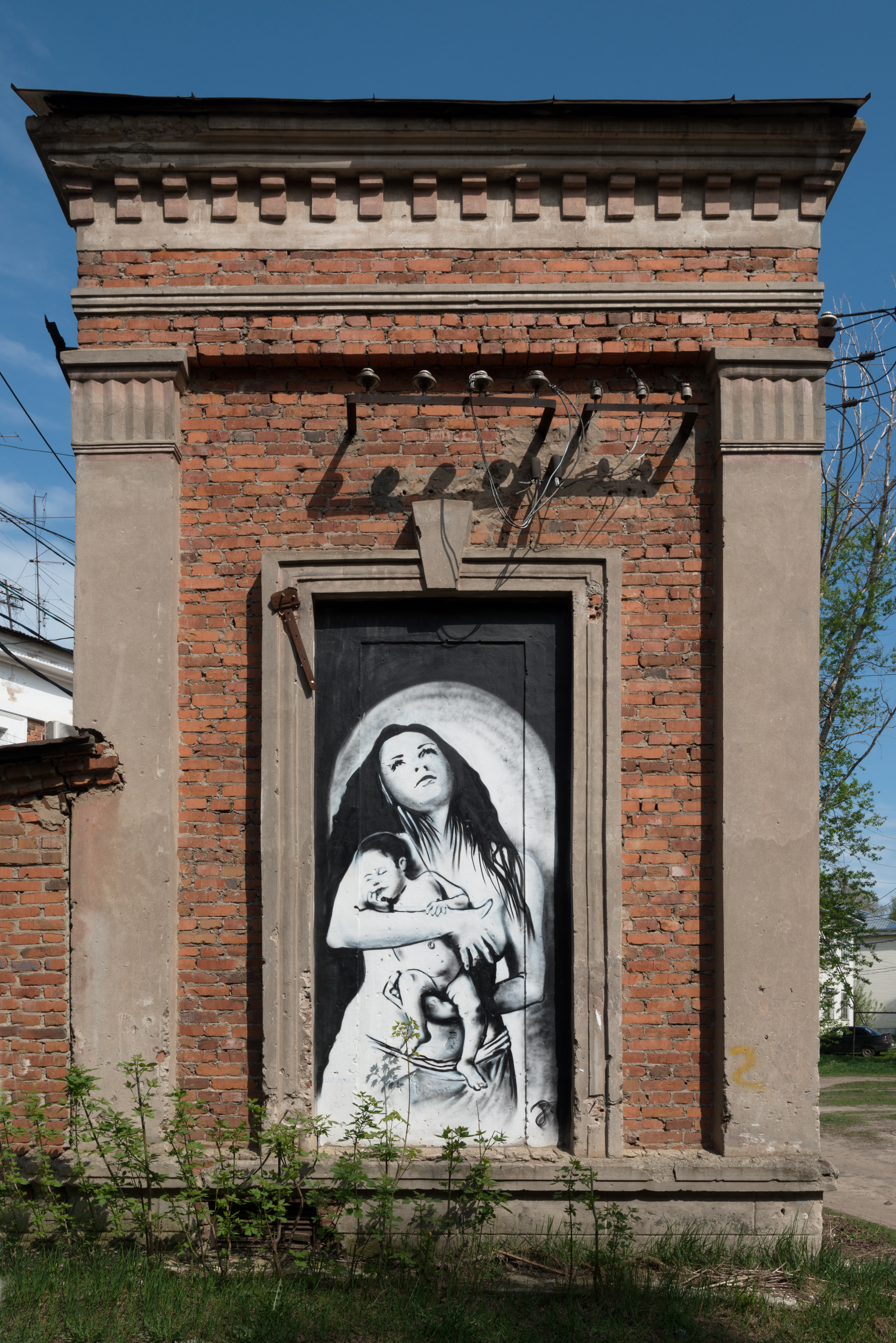
- Artwork by Pavel 183 in Vyksa
- Born: Pavel Pukhov; 11 August 1983; Moscow, Russian SFSR, Soviet Union (present-day Moscow, Russia)
- Died: 1 April 2013 (aged 29); Moscow, Russia
- Education: Communicative design
- Known for: Street art
- Website: 183art.ru

Pavel 183 (Russian: Павел Пухов, romanized: Pavel Pukhov; 11 August 1983 – 1 April 2013), was a Russian street artist, known by some as the "Russian Banksy".

== Art and activism ==
Pavel Pukhov fell in love with free expression when, as an 11-year-old, he stumbled upon Moscow's infamous Tsoi Wall, an alleyway in central Moscow covered in graffiti and messages commemorating the life and cult following of rock star Viktor Tsoi.

Pavel 183's works range from murals spray-painted on public structures to combinations of audio and video, at times accompanied by a political message. His works have been compared with those of the British street artist Banksy, and U.S. artist Keith Haring.

Like Banksy, Pukhov chose to keep his true identity a secret, revealing only a few biographical details on his website, including his birth and residence in Moscow and his degree in communicative design. However, he did not like the comparison, after 14 years spent forming his own style.

He attacked advertising for its power to deprive people of free will. He described designers as money makers and contrasts them with real artists, whose work he respects most. He was best known for his socially critical installations and grey-scale photorealistic murals. Later in his career, Pukhov explored different techniques of creation, eventually learning to draw in the dark with lights and to incorporate existing environmental aides, such as Moscow's waterways and concrete spaces.

While his works addressed political issues, he claimed not to consider himself a "political artist". One of his last works addresses the issue of the 2011 Russian legislative election, the results of which many in Moscow and around Russia have disputed.

== Career ==
Pukhov received a degree in communicative design, but never used the techniques he learned during his studies. He though had several jobs besides his nocturnal graffiti career, such as System administrator work, designer, restorer, art director, etc. In 2012 he garnered the attention of the international press.

Between 2012 and 2013, he was commissioned by theatrical production company Teatralnoye Delo ["Theater Works"] to design the scenery for the rock musical Todd; the company's spokeswoman announced Pavel Pukhov's death.

== Death ==
Pavel 183 died on 1 April 2013 from undisclosed causes. The cause of death was not released, and sources have given conflicting reports regarding the cause of death. The Times' Ben Hoyle wrote the Russian street art community was "in mourning."

== Quotes ==
- What is culture? Culture - a system of prohibitions
