= Pillar of Fire (sculpture) =

Sculpture in Washington, D.C.

- Artist: William Cochran
- Year: 2013
- Type: glass, concrete
- Dimensions: 4.9 m (16 ft)
- Location: 14th and S Streets NW Washington, D.C., U.S.; 38.914188°N 77.032141°W

Pillar of Fire is an illuminated glass sculpture in Washington, D.C. honoring Whitman-Walker Health (formerly Whitman-Walker Clinic) and the healthcare workers who assisted people living with HIV/AIDS during the height of the AIDS epidemic. Designed by artist William Cochran, the sculpture is composed of 370 layers of float glass that changes colors throughout the day. It was installed in 2013 in front of the old Whitman-Walker Clinic site at 14th and S Streets NW. The design was inspired by the ancient tale of a pillar of fire that led Israelites in their crossing of the Red Sea and through the desert after they fled Egypt.

== Design ==
Pillar of Fire is a 16 feet (4.9 m) high illuminated glass sculpture in the shape of a slender column which represents the pillar of fire that guided the Israelites at night. The glass weighs 2,000 pounds and is rigidly post-tensioned to a durable glass and steel rod placing the column under 15,000 pounds of pressure. The column is composed of 370 egg-shaped layers of float glass with unpolished edges that reflects natural light and is illuminated from within. The glasses ever-changing lights responds to changing atmospheric and lighting conditions throughout the day. An internal and external programmable lighting system creates the illumination. The color design at night is an abstraction of the rainbow flag, a symbol of LGBT pride. A plaque on the sculpture's concrete base says the artwork is dedicated to "Whitman-Walker Clinic and the many health care workers who served the LGBT community in this building from 1987 to 2008, the early years of the pandemic."

== Artists ==
The sculpture was designed by artist William Cochran of Frederick, Maryland, who specializes in large-scale public art installations. On choosing the design of the memorial, Cochran said "The title comes from this notion that when we get scared, as humans, we tend to bring out these old, dark myths of the Old Testament God that punishes people for sin and things that don’t make any sense. It’s darkness...And a place like Whitman-Walker has to work uphill against that to bring dignity and compassion to people caught up in a terrible situation...The 'pillar of fire' refers to the health care workers at Whitman-Walker, who did, in a moment of history, something so incredible that it can be an example for all of us, for the ages."

Lighting consultant John Coventry of Chevy Chase, Maryland, designed and donated the programmable lighting system. Acclaim Lighting of Los Angeles provided additional materials. Engineering services were provided by New York firm Eckersley O’Callaghan, which specializes in structural glass, and the assembly and installation was completed by Service Glass Industries of Frederick.

== History ==
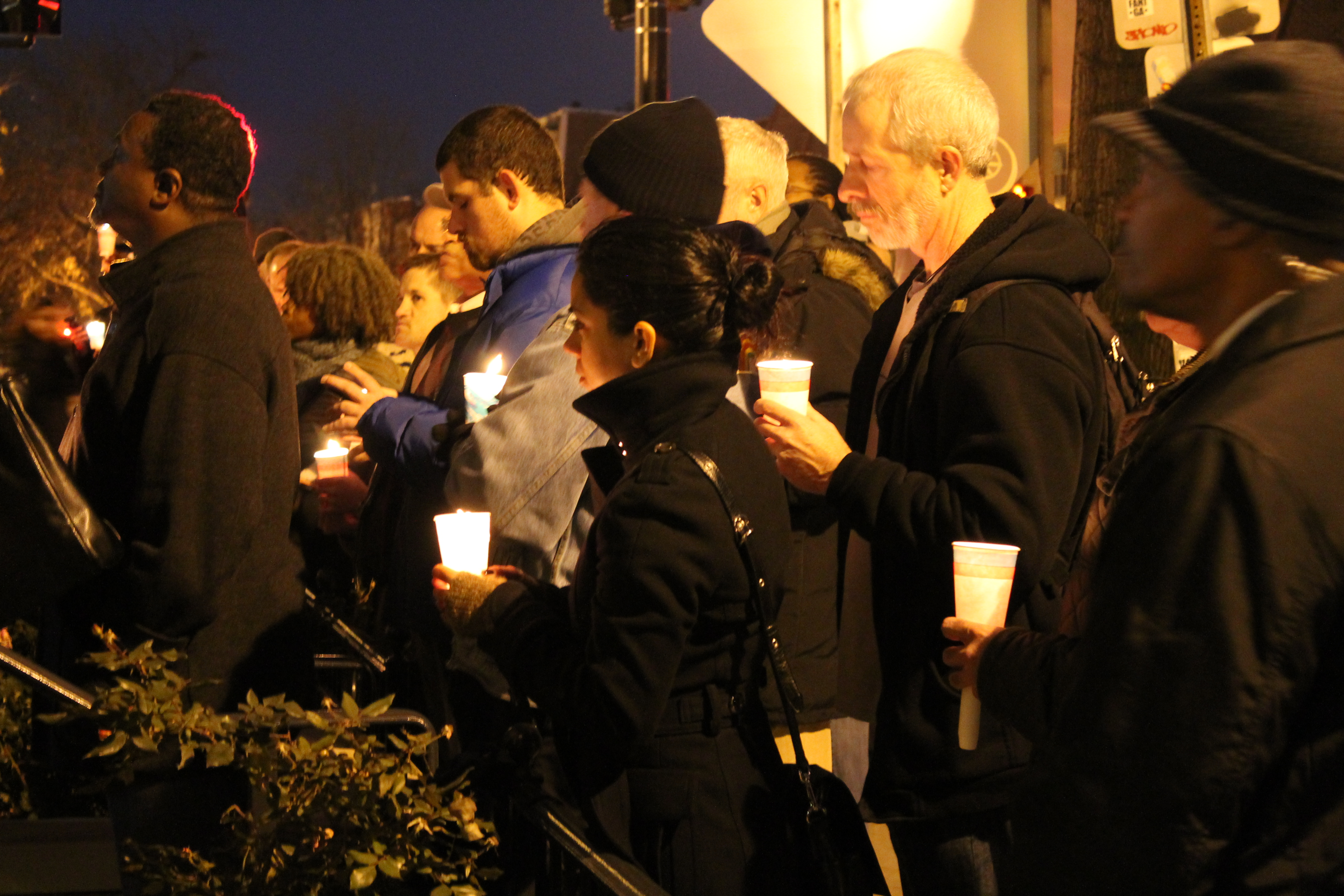
Whitman-Walker Health's 25th anniversary of holding a vigil on World AIDS Day in 2013. Attendees are gathered at the Pillar of Fire sculpture.

In 2008, JBG Smith purchased the Whitman-Walker Clinic's former building located at 1407 S Street NW in the Logan Circle neighborhood of Washington, D.C. The Historic Preservation Review Board (HPRB) suggested a plaque be placed on the building noting the history of the clinic. Instead the company wanted a more prominent way of honoring the healthcare workers and clinic's role in assisting people living with HIV/AIDS during the height of the AIDS epidemic. James Nozar, a vice president of JBG, said "We thought the work of the clinic during the peak of the AIDS epidemic was worthy of a better memorial than just a plaque." In 2012, JBG announced the memorial would be installed on the corner of 14th and S Streets in front of the renovated building which was incorporated into a 125-unit apartment complex called The District. The plan was approved by the HPRB, Office of Planning and Advisory Neighborhood Commission (ANC). Ramon Estrada, a member of the ANC, noted the area was designated an arts overlay district and the installation of public art was encouraged. The total cost of the project was $80,000.

Pillar of Fire was dedicated on November 4, 2013, with Cochran, representatives from JBG and Whitman-Walker, and Councilmember Jim Graham in attendance. Graham, executive director of Whitman-Walker from 1984 to 2009, stated: "This is a celebration of the human spirit...Because the human spirit that worked in this building, that worked with individuals who, very often, were very poor and facing what was then thought to be a terminal illness – and was, in fact a terminal illness – who had no resources, no support system, very little in the way of friends and supporters, often abandoned by their family, abandoned by their employers. They came to this building as a place of hope and response." The following month Mayor Vincent Gray and around 75 people held a candlelight vigil at the new memorial on World AIDS Day.

== See also ==
- List of public art in Washington, D.C., Ward 2
- Outdoor sculpture in Washington, D.C.
