= Walter Webb Hall =

Building in Austin, Texas, U.S.

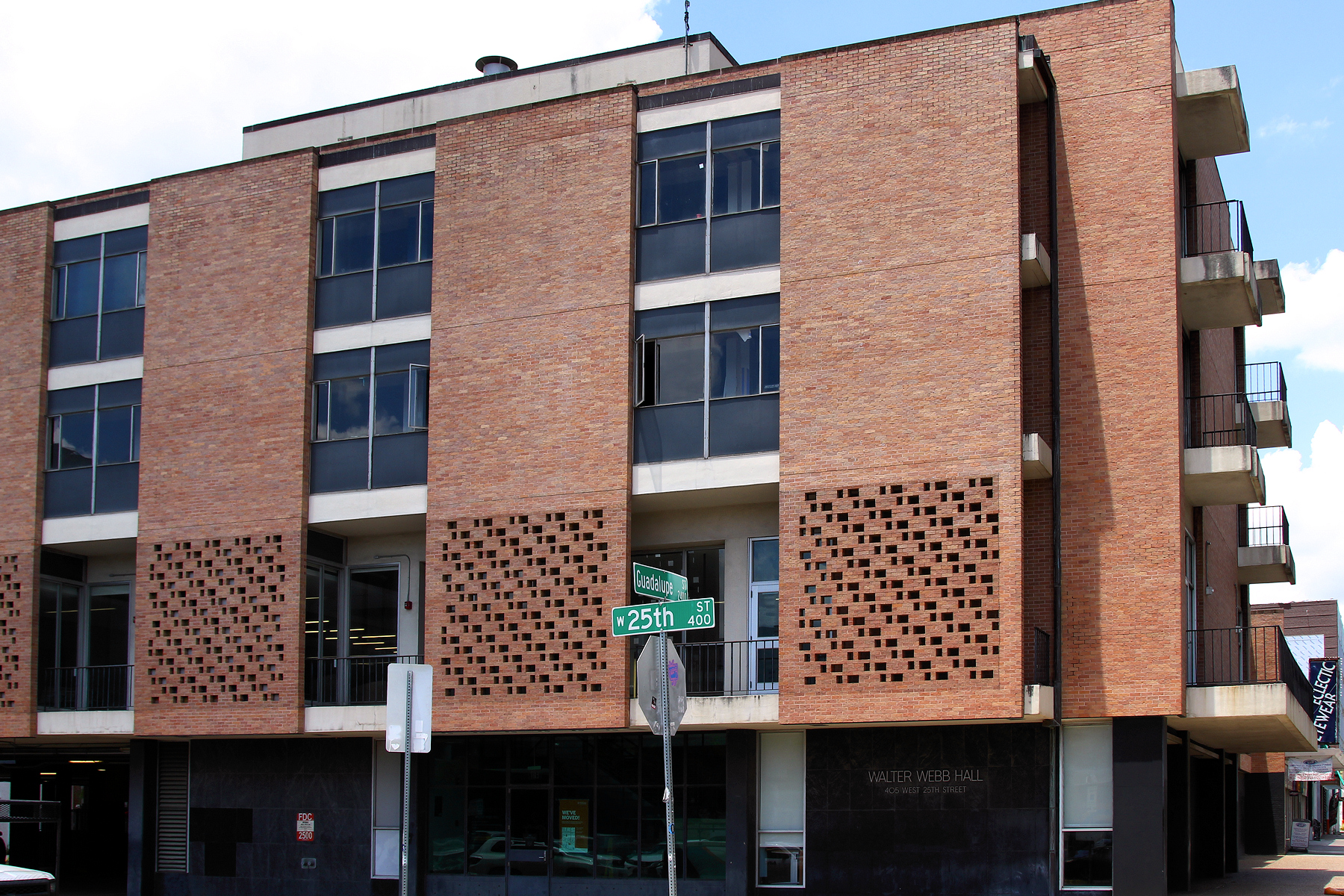
- Interactive map of the Walter Webb Hall area

General information
- Location: Austin, Texas, United States
- Coordinates: 30°17′21.5″N 97°44′30.5″W

Walter Webb Hall (WWH) is a building on the University of Texas at Austin campus, in the U.S. state of Texas. The building was completed in 1973, and has housed the campus club and faculty center.

The Texas Historical Association started renting space in the building in 2015.
