= Mark Milloff =

American painter

- Born: 1953 (age 72–73); Miami, Florida, U.S.
- Education: Connecticut College, Maryland Institute College of Art (MICA)
- Known for: Painting

Mark Milloff (born 1953 in Miami, Florida) is an internationally exhibited American painter and art professor. He is best known for his heavily layered oil paintings.

== Work ==
Mark attended and graduated from Connecticut College with a Bachelor of Arts and Maryland Institute College of Art (MICA) with his Master of Fine Arts. He has been exhibiting his work for over thirty years beginning with exhibitions at the Alan Stone Gallery in New York City, while he was still in graduate school. At present Milloff is a professor of art at the Rhode Island School of Design, where among his students has been Jordan Wolfson.

In 2013 his work was the subject of a one-man exhibition at the Lyman Allyn Art Museum in New London, Connecticut, "Mark Milloff: An Artist Renders the Whale". Milloff along with Kyle Anderson make up the musical duo the "Cannibal Ramblers" whose sound has been spoken of as "death Delta, Punk and country Blues being dragged by a runaway train....".

He currently lives in Providence with his wife Christine and two children.
