= David Franklin (curator) =

David Franklin is an art historian with expertise in Italian Renaissance art, a curator, and a former art museum director.

== Thomson Collection ==
David Franklin is employed by the Thomson Collection in Toronto, Ontario. On April 8, 2015, he gave his first public lecture under this affiliation at the National Gallery of Canada's Wednesday Morning Lecture Series, focusing his remarks on Piero de Cosimo's painting. Franklin helped plan the Canadian Photography Institute, which has promised gifts from the Archive of Modern Conflict and major funding from Bank of Nova Scotia. He is an editor of The Canadians (2016), a selection of photographs from The Globe and Mail archives. Mr Franklin was also the managing editor of All at War: German photography by German Soldiers 1939-45, by I. Jeffrey.

== Cleveland Museum of Art ==
Franklin was named director of the Cleveland Museum of Art in 2010. While Franklin, a Renaissance scholar was Director of the Cleveland Museum of Art, a donation of $1,000,000 was made by Leigh Carter in 2013 to the museum's endowment to fund a permanent fellowship to help the museum's director conduct research on special art historical projects.

Dr. Franklin presented his vision for the museum at the City Club on February 25, 2011. World Famous Cleveland Club Lecture

And on May 23, 2011, Franklin participated in a discussion to celebrate International Museums Day, at the Toledo Museum of Art.

He gave a TED Talk May 26, 2011. TEDxCLE Talk

On October 30, 2012, he presided over the public opening of the atrium of the Cleveland Museum of Art. Cleveland Museum of Art Atrium opening

After a three-year tenure, Franklin abruptly resigned on October 21, 2013, citing personal reasons and a need "to do more research and writing". Soon thereafter, the Cleveland Scene revealed that Franklin (married with two children) had been in a romantic relationship with an employee of the museum. The board of directors at the museum had been made aware of the affair when the employee was found to have apparently committed suicide in her Cleveland Heights apartment, shortly after she and Franklin were supposed to have travelled to Spain together, and one week before they were supposed to travel to Italy. According to police reports, David Franklin called the 911 himself and was the only person present at the scene. When police came to investigate the suspicious death, Franklin lied to the officers, pretending having received a text message from the woman, which, according to the Police, never happened. He claimed to have run to the apartment after receiving this text message and to have discovered the body by entering the apartment through an open door. In the course of the investigation, it became apparent that the employee's digital camera and cell phone were missing. These items were eventually recovered. Police have also discovered that a major transfer of data had been done from the woman's phone shortly after she was found dead. As the family could not believe many details of the reported story, a detective was assigned to further investigate the death and Franklin's story. When this revelation came to the attention of the board, Franklin was forced to resign.

== National Gallery of Canada ==
Previously, Franklin served as deputy director of the National Gallery of Canada. He worked at the National Gallery of Canada for twelve years, beginning as the curator of prints and eventually rising to the post of deputy director and chief curator. In 2009, the National Gallery of Canada Foundation received a donation from the philanthropists Donald and Beth Sobey for The Donald and Beth Sobey Chief Curator's Research Endowment. While at the National Gallery, Franklin became involved in a controversy involving the firing of a subordinate. The unsubstantiated action of completely removing emails, by deleting emails from his system's trash, was seen as a move to remove evidence of wrongful termination. Franklin denied this. He was removed from his post, and after suing the institution, was restored to his position. Mr. Franklin was fully reinstated and the National Gallery of Canada paid all legal costs. He continued to co-curate the Art of Papal Rome exhibition (2009) for the National Gallery of Canada, as well as Carvaggio and his Roman circle, which was also shown at the Kimbell Art Museum in 2011.

== Education and scholarship ==
1991–94, the Slade and Shuffrey Fellow in Italian Renaissance Art, Lincoln College, University of Oxford. 1994–98, Post-doctoral research Fellow at All Souls College, University of Oxford Franklin holds a B.A. (Honours) from Queen's University, a Master's and PhD from London's Courtauld Institute of Art with specialization in Italian Renaissance art. He won two prizes from Yale University Press for his first book, and remains active as a scholar.

== Publications and Books ==
Gergely Papp 1938-1963, Ecsegfalva, Hungary, Bone Idle Books, 2018

Polidoro da Caravaggio, London and New Haven, Yale University Press, 2018.

Contributing author to Piero di Cosimo: The Poetry of Painting in Renaissance Florence, Gretchen A. Hirschauer and Dennis Geronimus, eds., Washington, National Gallery of Art, 2015. (Recipient of an Honorable Mention in the category of Art Exhibitions at the 2016 PROSE awards.)

Treasures of the Cleveland Museum of Art, edited by David Franklin and C. Griffith Mann, Scala Publishing, 2012.

Treasures of the National Gallery of Canada, edited by David Franklin, Yale University Press. 2003.

Painting in Renaissance Florence from 1500 to 1550, London and New Haven, Yale University Press, 2001.

Rosso in Italy: The Italian Career of Rosso Fiorentino, London and New Haven, Yale University Press, 1994. (Recipient of the Mitchell Prize for the History of Art in the First Book, 1995.)

Modigliani. Between Renaissance and Modernism.

"Rosso Fiorentino, Marcillat and Vasari in Arezzo: the Reinvention of the Image of the Immaculate Conception", in La Disputa sull'Immacolata Concezione nella Toscana del Cinquecento, ed. C. Hollberg, Florence 2022, pp. 109-123.

"A rediscovered 'Pietà' by Andrea del Sarto", The Burlington Magazine, 166, 2024, pp. 236-243.

== Exibibition Catalogues ==
Forty-Part Motet by Janet Cardiff (Cleveland Museum of Art, 2013).

Caravaggio and his Roman circle (National Gallery of Canada and the Kimbell Art Museum, 2011).

From Raphael to the Carracci: The Art of Papal Rome (National Gallery of Canada, 2009).

Leonardo da Vinci, Michelangelo and the Renaissance in Florence (National Gallery of Canada, 2005).

The Art of Parmigianino (National Gallery of Canada and the Frick Collection New York, 2003).

Italian Drawings from the National Gallery of Canada 2003.

== Awards ==
Franklin was inducted a fellow at Hiram College in 2011 for his significant professional achievement and efforts that substantially enriched the college and their communities.

The Stella della solidarietà italiana (Star of Italian Solidarity) by the Republic of Italy in 2009, in recognition of David Franklin's knowledge of Italian art and his contribution to its appreciation in Canada.

1995 Governors' Award for Yale University Press, voted best book by author under the age of forty

1995, Gold medal awarded by the Comune of Piombino for the essay "Rosso Fiorentino e Jacopo V Appiani: L'Arte a Piombino nella prima parte del Cinquecento"

1995 Eric Mitchell Prize for Rosso in Italy: The Italian Career of Rosso Fiorentino.

1988–1990, Social Sciences and Humanities Research Council of Canada, Doctoral Fellowship

1985–1988, Commonwealth Scholarship
