= Rahile Omer =

Uyghur detainee (2003–2026)

- راھىلە ئۆمەر
- Born: 2003; Lengger, Konasheher County, Xinjiang, China
- Died: c. October 2026 (aged 23); Peyziwat County, Xinjiang, China
- Known for: Youngest Uyghur detained by the Chinese government
- Criminal charges: Disturbing public order
- Criminal penalty: 12 years' imprisonment
- Criminal status: Convicted

Rahile Omer (Uyghur: راھىلە ئۆمەر, Chinese: 拉希尔·奥马尔; pinyin: Lā Xī Ěr Ào Mǎ'ěr; c. 2003 – c. October 2026) was an Uyghur woman who was believed to be the youngest Uyghur person detained by the Chinese government when she was arrested in 2017 at the age of 14. After being held in various re-education camps, in 2021 Rahile was sentenced to 12 years in prison on charges of "disturbing public order" and transferred to a prison, where she died in late 2026.

== Early life ==
Rahile was born and raised in Lengger, a village in Konasheher County, Xinjiang, China, near the city of Kashgar. Her father was reported to be a government official, though his exact identity was unknown.

== Arrest and detention ==
On 3 July 2017, Rahile's parents were arrested and detained by Chinese security officers. It was reported that her mother was subsequently sentenced to eight years in prison. Rahile's parents' detention status has not been verified, though Uyghur media outlets stated that both of them had died by the time of Rahile's own death in 2026.

Following her parents' arrest, Rahile was designated as a "class 12" individual by Chinese authorities, meaning that she was linked as a person of interest to an ongoing police investigation. Rahile was arrested on 28 September 2017, two months after her parents, on charges of "illegally gathering to disturb social order".

Between 2017 and 2019, Rahile was held at the Opal training centre in Konasheher County; in 2019, she was moved to a detention centre in Toqquzaq, where she remained until 2021. Both locations were officially designated by the Chinese government as "vocational education and training centres" but have been described as concentration camps by human rights groups.

In October 2021, at the age of 18, Rahile was convicted of "disturbing public order" and sentenced to 12 years in prison, and was moved to a prison in Payziwat County. Radio Free Asia reported that she had been found guilty after not providing information to Chinese authorities about other Uyghurs, and after being caught praying in her dormitory; a judge concluded that she was "not re-educated".

In 2022, 5, 074 mug shots of Uyghur detainees were leaked to German anthropologist Adrian Zenz in what became known as the Xinjiang Police Files. One of the photographs, dated 20 March 2018, was subsequently identified as being of Rahile, taken at a police station in Toqquzaq when she was 15. Rahile was the youngest of 15 minors identified from the photographs, with the BBC describing her as the youngest Uyghur detainee held by China.

== Death and response ==
On 6 November 2026, Radio Free Asia reported that Rahile had died in prison in Peyziwat County at the age of 23. It shared information provided by an anonymous Chinese official based in Xinjiang, who stated that she had died of a heart condition, potentially linked to tuberculosis, the previous month; a second officer, also anonymous, alleged she had died two months earlier. A social media post, however, suggested Rahile had died of depression linked to the deaths in custody of both her parents.

Human Rights Watch's China researcher Yalkun Uluyol called on state governments to pressure their Chinese counterparts to reveal what happened to Rahile. Similarly, Rahima Mahmut, executive director of Stop Uyghur Genocide, said that the Chinese government had responsibility for Rahile's health and wellbeing, and so needed to provide an explanation into what led to her death. She further added that she would "never forget" the mugshot of Rahile found in the Xinjiang Police File, and commented on how little was known about her suffering between her detention in 2017 and death in 2026.

Mamtimin Ala, the president of the East Turkistan Government in Exile, stated that Rahile's story reflected the suffering of Uyghur people, adding that she represented "a genocide and a crime against humanity".
