= Xinjiang Victims Database =

Database of Xinjiang re-education camp detainees

- Formation: September 2018
- Founder: Gene Bunin
- Type: Database
- Purpose: Database of Xinjiang camp detainees
- Website: https://shahit.biz/eng/

The Xinjiang Victims Database is a database which attempts to record all currently known individuals who are detained in Xinjiang re-education camps in China. The database has documented over 16,000 victims. It was founded by Gene Bunin, who started the database in September 2018.

The database contains the names and biographical details of people who are thought to be detained in the camps. Many of the profiles also contain personal testimonies by the families and friends of the detainees.

== Origin ==
Gene Bunin is a Russian-American linguistic researcher, who lived in Xinjiang until 2018, when Chinese police forced him to leave. He created the database to “have one place" to store detailed information of people interred in prison camps or disappeared after only "limited attempts" had been made to identify detainees.

== Image sourcing controversy ==
On 6 January 2023, the Xinjiang Victims Database published a list of "over 2,000 Ürümqi police officers" along with a gallery of portraits. However, it was pointed out that images of two Xinjiang police officers listed in the database actually were of the Hong Kong celebrities Andy Lau Tak-wah and Chow Yun-fat. After it drew attention on social media and was mocked by Chinese state media, the Xinjiang Victims Database later responded stating that the data was sourced from "the file cache of a Urumqi database" obtained by the US news organization, The Intercept, which had included a photo of Andy Lau, and added that some of the photos of the police officers “aren’t always of themselves”.

== See also ==
- China Cables
- Xinjiang papers
- Xinjiang Police Files
