= Mihrigul Tursun =

Former Uyghur detainee

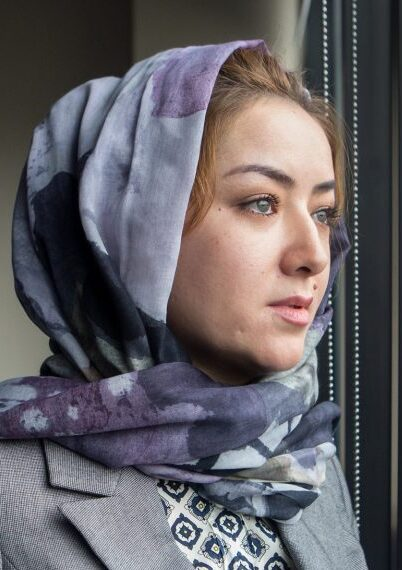
- Born: 28 December 1989 (age 36); Cherchen, Xinjiang, China
- Education: Guangzhou University; British University in Egypt
- Known for: Former detainee in Xinjiang re-education camps
- Children: 2 sons, 1 daughter

Mihrigul Tursun (Uyghur: مېھرىگۈل تۇرسۇن, romanized: Mehrigül Tursun; born 28 December 1989) is a reported former Uyghur detainee from Xinjiang, China.

After immigrating to the United States in 2018, Tursun claimed that she was taken into the custody of Chinese authorities several times, including being imprisoned at one of a network of Xinjiang re-education camps for Uyghurs, subject to torture, and that one of her sons died while she was in the custody of Chinese authorities in 2015. Her story was widely reported in international media.

In 2019, China's Ministry of Foreign Affairs denied Tursun's allegations and gave their own account of events.

== In China ==
Mihrigul Tursun was born in China on 28 December 1989. Her family lives in the Qiemo County, Bayingolin Mongol Autonomous Prefecture, in Xinjiang. In May 2015 after returning from Egypt, where she was studying, and where she had married and had triplets, while her husband remained in Egypt, she was allegedly taken into custody by Chinese authorities, imprisoned for several weeks in the Xinjiang re-education camps, and during that time, according to her testimony, one of her infant sons died in a hospital under mysterious circumstances. According to Tursun, she was arrested because she had lived for a time in Egypt, and that was enough to attract the attention of the authorities due to a perceived threat of religious radicalization (she was arrested at the airport immediately following her arrival). According to Chinese authorities, she was arrested on suspicion of inciting ethnic hatred and discrimination. She was later detained again in April 2017 and January 2018.

In early 2018 she was given permission to take her children to Egypt, where they had been born and whose citizenship they also hold. In September 2018 she immigrated to the United States with her two other children.

== In the United States ==
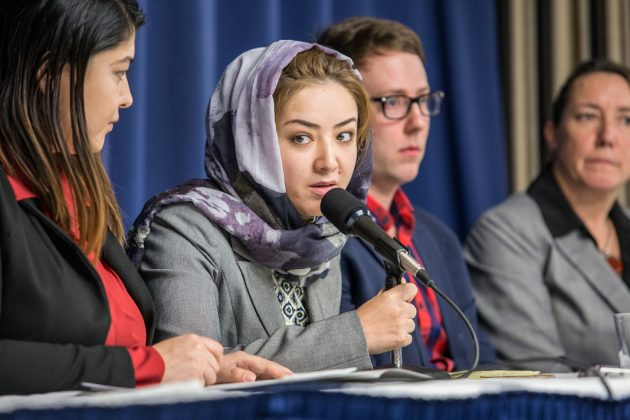
Mihrigul Tursun testifies at the National Press Club in Washington.

On 26 November 2018, Mihrigul Tursun gave testimony at National Press Club in Washington, DC. There she claimed that detainees in those camps are beaten, starved, electrocuted, and strip-searched. She said:

"My hands bled from their beatings, each time I was electrocuted, my whole body would shake violently and I could feel the pain in my veins, I thought I would rather die than go through this torture and begged them to kill me."

On 28 November 2018, Mihrigul Tursun, speaking through a translator, testified before the Congressional-Executive Commission on China about her experience over a series of three internments. She said: "There were around 60 people kept in a 430 square feet [40 m^{2}] cell so at nights, 10 to 15 women would stand up while the rest of us would sleep on sideways so we could fit, and then we would rotate every 2 hours. There were people who had not taken a shower over a year."

In December 2018, Tursun received a Citizen Power Award.

Tursun in an interview stated that she has not seen her husband since 2015, and she has learned that upon his return to China in 2016 he was arrested and sentenced to 16 years of imprisonment (of which his family was not informed and about which she learned only in 2018).

While in the US, she also learned that she had been forcibly sterilized, allegedly during compulsory treatments while in custody in China.

In 2019 What Has Happened to Me – A Testimony of a Uyghur Woman, a Japanese comic book recounting the story told by Mihrigul Tursun, illustrated by artist Tomomi Shimizu, has become a viral hit on the Internet.

== According to the Government of China ==
Responding to a CNN report, in 2019 China's Foreign Ministry Spokesperson Hua Chunying denied Tursun's allegations and gave their own account of the events.

According to Hua, Tursun was taken into custody by Qiemo County police for 20 days from 21 April – 20 May 2017 on suspicion of inciting ethnic hatred and discrimination but she was never jailed or put in a "vocational training center" (the government's term for the re-education camps). Hua said that apart from those 20 days, she was totally free during her stay in China and traveled abroad extensively.

Hua also said that while detained, she was diagnosed with an unspecified infectious disease, rejected Tursun's claim that one of her sons died in Ürümqi's Children's Hospital, and said that her husband, an Egyptian, left the country with her and her children, returning to Egypt in April 2018.

== See also ==
- Tursunay Ziyawudun
- Uyghur Americans
- Uyghur Human Rights Policy Act
- Magnitsky Act
- United States sanctions against China
