= Chimengul Awut =

Uyghur writer

Chimengul Awut is a poet and editor of the state-owned Kashgar Publishing House. In July 2018, she was arrested along with 3 others (a deputy editor-in-chief and two former editors-in-chief) by the Chinese Government, for their writings in books that were deemed "problematic" or "dangerous." She is a Uyghur. She was detained as part of Uyghur detention, and was released in late 2020. Her poem The Road of No Return won the Tulpar Literature Award in 2008.
