= Xinjiang Data Project =

China-focused Australian research project and website

- Founder: Australian Strategic Policy Institute
- Purpose: Publicize human rights violations in Xinjiang
- Location: Barton (Canberra), Australia
- Official language: English
- Funding: United States Department of State
- Website: xjdp.aspi.org.au

The Xinjiang Data Project is a China-focused Australian research project created and managed by the Australian Strategic Policy Institute (ASPI). The project states that it has identified grave human rights violations in Xinjiang, including the mass detention of minorities, and compulsory sterilizations.

The researchers found that one out of every three mosques have been demolished in Xinjiang since 2017.

== Launch and funding ==
The ASPI launched the Xinjiang Data Project in September 2020 as a part of its International Cyber Policy Centre. According to the project's website, initial funding for the project came from the United States Department of State.

== Publication of information from Xinjiang ==
According to the project, satellite data has allowed it to locate "380 suspected detention facilities" in Xinjiang, and to estimate that 35 % of mosques in the region have been demolished, including a pilgrimage town, Ordam Mazar. The project says that it has also used interviews from former inmates to collect information. The project has promoted research by Adrian Zenz, a senior fellow at the Victims of Communism Memorial Foundation, who says that the Chinese government has embarked on a program of mass sterilization in Xinjiang.

According to the researchers, development in the region is being used as a "facade for cultural erasure and desecration of religious sites."

The Chinese government has responded that the camps are vocational training and re-education programs meant to alleviate poverty and counter terrorism.

== See also ==
- 2020s in political history
- Human rights in China
- Australia–China relations
- Australia–United States relations
- China–United States relations
- Australia-Taiwan relations
- Xinjiang Victims Database

== References cited ==
- "China running 380 detention centres in Xinjiang: Researchers". Al Jazeera English. 24 September 2020.
- Munro, Kelsey (25 September 2020). "Xinjiang Data Project website launch". Australian Strategic Policy Institute.
- "Committee on the Elimination of Racial Discrimination reviews the report of China". Office of the United Nations High Commissioner for Human Rights. 13 August 2018.
- Graham-Harrison, Emma (23 September 2020). "China has built 380 internment camps in Xinjiang, study finds". The Guardian.
- "The Xinjiang Data Project". Australian Strategic Policy Institute.
- Robin, Myriam (15 February 2020). "The think tank behind Australia's changing view of China". Australian Financial Review.
- "China appears to add a sickening new dimension to its treatment of Uighurs". The Washington Post. 3 January 2020. Archived from the original on 2020-01-03.
- Zenz, Adrian (21 July 2020). "Sterilizations and Mandatory Birth Control in Xinjiang". The Zinjiang Data Project. Australian Strategic Policy Institute.
- Hellstern, Remy; Park, Daniel C.; Lemieux, Victoria; Salimjan, Guldana (18 July 2022). "Leveraging Blockchain-Based Archival Solutions for Sensitive Documentation: a Xinjiang Case Study". Digital Society. 1 (1): 4. doi:10.1007/s44206-022-00007-1. ISSN 2731-4669. PMC 9289082. PMID 36147998.
