= Beijing Rules: How China Weaponized Its Economy to Confront the World =

2023 book by Bethany Allen

Beijing Rules: How China Weaponized Its Economy to Confront the World is a 2023 nonfiction book by American journalist Bethany Allen. The book examines how the Chinese Communist Party (CCP) has used market access, trade restrictions, and influence over multinational companies and international institutions to advance its political objectives abroad, a practice Allen terms "authoritarian economic statecraft." It was published in the United States by Harper on August 1, 2023, and in the United Kingdom by Hachette under the title Beijing Rules: China's Quest for Global Influence.

== Overview ==
Drawing on her long reporting career, including work on the International Consortium of Investigative Journalists' China Cables project, Allen argues that the assumption underlying decades of Western policy toward China—that integrating Beijing into global markets would gradually liberalize its political system—has proven naive. She argues capitalism functions as a two-way street, allowing authoritarianism to spread internationally just as democratic values were once expected to. The book argues that the CCP has instead built a system of state-directed capitalism that it uses to extend political control beyond China's borders by linking market access and corporate profit to political compliance.

Allen opens the book with the global scramble for personal protective equipment (PPE) in the early days of the COVID-19 pandemic, treating it as a turning point that revealed the depth of Western economic dependence on China and pushed several democracies to reconsider that relationship.

== Contents and major themes ==
=== Authoritarian economic statecraft ===
Allen frames her central concept, "authoritarian economic statecraft," as an alternative to more commonly used terms such as sharp power, contrasting it with conventional uses of economic statecraft, such as sanctions, by the United States and other democracies.

=== Corporate and institutional pressure ===
A chapter on the video-conferencing company Zoom describes how the firm's presence in China subjected it to domestic law requiring the sharing of user data with the Ministry of State Security, China's principal civilian intelligence agency. Allen reports that a China-based Zoom executive, in a case later detailed in a U.S. Department of Justice indictment, exceeded the company's own authorizations to suspend the accounts of certain U.S.-based users and disrupted online commemorations of the 1989 Tiananmen Square crackdown.

=== Economic coercion against states ===
The book examines Beijing's use of trade restrictions as political retaliation citing two cases. After Australia called for an international investigation into the origins of COVID-19 in 2020, China issued a list of grievances and banned a range of Australian exports, including coal, beef, barley, wine, and timber. A similar pattern followed when Lithuania allowed a "Taiwanese Representative Office" in Vilnius rather than a "Taipei" office in 2021, after which China blocked Lithuanian imports and extended informal secondary pressure to firms elsewhere in Europe that used Lithuanian-sourced parts. Allen argues these episodes show how Beijing's definition of its "core interests," historically tied to territorial sovereignty, has broadened to include foreign criticism of the Chinese government more generally.

=== Diaspora communities ===
Allen examines the 2020 imposition of the National Security Law in Hong Kong as part of the same broader pattern of coercive statecraft, and describes what she calls a CCP "dual-function strategy" toward overseas Chinese communities, in which party-linked organizations claim to represent diaspora interests while serving party political aims. In a Wire China interview, Allen said the concept describes how the United Front Work Department works to co-opt or, in some cases, directly create community organizations; she cited the National Association for China's Peaceful Unification as an example of a body she characterized as a direct extension of the United Front Work Department, alongside other organizations that host genuine cultural activities but are at times mobilized on the party's behalf, such as organizing demonstrations during visits by Chinese leaders. She argued that this dynamic polarizes debate in host societies and leaves diaspora communities facing both surveillance from Beijing and suspicion at home.

=== Policy Recommendation ===
In Beijing Rules, Bethany Allen advocates building a “democratic economic statecraft” to counter China’s “authoritarian economic statecraft.” She argues that Western governments must deliberately re-link economic activity with democratic principles (free speech, transparency, rule of law, etc.), rather than treating markets as purely neutral or leaving responses to individual companies or civil-society pressure alone.

== Reception ==
Beijing Rules was longlisted for the Financial Times and Schroders Business Book of the Year Award in 2023.

Reviewing the book in Journal of Democracy, Theresa Fallon, director of the Centre for Russia Europe Asia Studies, credited Allen with an informative and extensive account of the CCP's confrontational tools of influence, writing that the book should puncture optimistic assumptions about Beijing's intentions. Fallon was more critical of the book's geographic focus, arguing that Allen concentrates her analysis on the United States and assumes too readily that Western partners will follow the American lead on China policy, and questioned the practicality of some of the book's policy proposals given competing demands on US government budgets.

A review for the Council on Foreign Relations by Abi McGowan described the book as an expert overview of China's conduct on the international stage, compiling Allen's reporting into a comprehensive account of Beijing's pursuit of global influence alongside advice for democracies on how to respond. The review noted that the book's timeliness underscores how much both China and the wider geopolitical environment have shifted since the COVID-19 outbreak in Wuhan.

Kirkus Reviews, in a starred review, called the book a penetrating study of Beijing's strategy for achieving global dominance and praised Allen for showing courage in writing it, given the long, powerful, and patient reach of the Chinese government. Publishers Weekly described it as an elegantly written investigation that blends economic history with vivid reporting. The Guardian called the book a timely read that helps separate legitimate concerns about the Chinese government's conduct from a rise in anti-Asian racism in the West.
