= Merdan Ghappar =

Uyghur prisoner in China

Merdan Ghappar is a Chinese model and a prisoner of Uyghur heritage. He became known for his internment in one of China's Xinjiang re-education camps in 2020. Merdan managed to smuggle video footage and text messages from his re-education camp to family members in Europe, who then passed the material on to the press. As of 5 August 2020, his status was unknown.

== Childhood and early career ==
Merdan was born in Kucha, Xinjiang, China. He studied dance at Xinjiang Arts University before moving to Eastern China in 2009, eventually finding work as a model for online marketplace Taobao in Foshan.

== Detentions ==
=== Background ===
As a Uyghur, Merdan risked detention in the Xinjiang re-education camps. While living in larger Chinese cities, Merdan was told by his modeling boss to hide his Uyghur heritage and describe himself as having European features. When he attempted to purchase an apartment, local and government authorities denied him from changing his registered residency location out of Xinjiang under the hukou system and he was forced to register it under a Chinese friend's name.

=== Detentions since 2018 ===
Merdan lived in Foshan until 30 July 2018, when he was arrested and charged with "selling five grams of marijuana" by the Nanhai District Court of Foshan in South China's Guangdong Province. His family denies the charges, and his friends protested that the charge was trumped up, stating that he already had sufficient money and popularity and so had no need of selling drugs. Merdan was sentenced to 16 months in prison, and he was released in November 2019. One month later in December, he was forced to return to his registered residency location (hukou) and told it was for a "routine registration procedure". Evidence shows that he was not suspected of any further offense. In January 2020 he was flown to Xinjiang and taken to his home city of Kucha, after which he disappeared into the camps. According to his uncle, the likely reason for Merdan's detention was Merdan's uncle's involvement in overseas protests against the Chinese government.

According to Merdan's account (later smuggled out), he was placed in a holding cell with other Uyghur political prisoners before being sent to a re-education camp. He described being subjected to Chinese government propaganda, being abused by guards, and listening to other prisoners being tortured. Initially held with other prisoners, Merdan was still incarcerated when the COVID-19 pandemic forced the camp's administration to adopt containment measures, including the taking of prisoner's temperatures to test for COVID-19 symptoms. When his temperature was found to be higher than average, he was separated from the main body of prisoners; he was also allowed access to usually-restricted personal effects, which included his personal phone. Using the phone, Merdan used WeChat to send a number of text messages to his family describing conditions in the camp, and also took self-videos of himself (one of which showed how he had been handcuffed to his bed).

Merdan 's messages continued for several days before ceasing. As of 5 August 2020, his status is unknown.

=== Report from internment ===
Merdan sent his messages and videos to his family, who in turn forwarded them to his uncle in the Netherlands. Though they were aware that publishing his content would put him in danger, Merdan's family chose to send his content to the press. Professor James Millward of Georgetown University translated Merdan's texts to English.

German anthropologist Adrian Zenz noted that Merdan's material was particularly important as it showed that the Xinjiang camps were still in use.

=== Government reactions ===
In a fax released in early August 2020, Chinese authorities claimed that Merdan had been detained due to a risk of self harm and due to aggressive actions against police officers. University of Colorado anthropologist Darren Byler described the official reaction as an example of "victim blaming that is often used by the police when caught using excessive force".

=== Support campaign ===
In late August 2020, Amnesty International launched a support campaign for Merdan.

=== Media attention ===
Ruth Smeeth, chief executive officer of Index on Censorship, cited the media attention to Merdan's detention as an example justifying freedom of the press, online social media and "global news coverage".
