= Xinjiang papers =

Collection of leaked internal Chinese government documents

Map showing the location of Xinjiang, China

The Xinjiang papers are a collection of over 400 pages of what are claimed to be internal Chinese government documents describing the government policy regarding Uyghur Muslims in the Xinjiang region. In November 2019, journalists Austin Ramzy and Chris Buckley at The New York Times broke the story that characterized the documents as "one of the most significant leaks of government papers from inside China's ruling Communist Party in decades." According to The New York Times, the documents were leaked by a source inside the Chinese Communist Party and include a breakdown of how China created and organized the Xinjiang re-education camps. Human rights groups, like Amnesty International, consider the Xinjiang Papers credible and use them to build reports.

In response to the Xinjiang papers' publication, the Chinese government claimed the documents were "sheer, pure fabrication". The leak has led to increased scrutiny and criticism of China's camps in Xinjiang.

== Description and contents ==
The Xinjiang papers are a collection of over 400 pages of leaked internal Chinese documents detailing the detention of Uyghur Muslims in Xinjiang by the Chinese Communist Party. They consist of internal speeches by CCP General Secretary Xi Jinping and other officials, reports of population control and surveillance of Uyghur Muslims in Xinjiang, and internal investigations into local officials.

=== Internal Speeches by Xi and other officials ===
In a series of internal speeches in 2014, Xi called for a "struggle against terrorism, infiltration, and separatism" in Xinjiang. Responding to terror attacks in Xinjiang, Xi called for the Chinese government to be "as harsh as them" and "show absolutely no mercy." Xi compared Islamic extremism to a "virus-like contagion" and a "dangerously addictive drug", which would require "a period of painful, interventionary treatment." Xi mentioned that camps must implement "effective educational remolding and transformation of criminals", and that "education and transformation" must continue after people were released.

Xi warned that unrest in Syria and Afghanistan would allow terrorist organizations to infiltrate into Central Asia and launch terrorist attacks in Xinjiang. He stated that if violence spread to other parts of China, "social stability will suffer shocks, the general unity of people of every ethnicity will be damaged, and the broad outlook for reform, development, and stability will be affected." In their campaign in Xinjiang, Xi encouraged officials to emulate America's "war on terror" following the September 11 attacks. According to The New York Times, Xi's speeches show how he views threats to the party through the lens of the collapse of the Soviet Union, which he attributed to "ideological laxity and spineless leadership."

The Xinjiang papers also contain internal speeches by other CCP officials. Zhu Hailun, Xinjiang's former top security official, cited terrorist attacks in the United Kingdom as a "warning and lesson" for China to adequately control the propagation of extremism. Zhu claimed that the UK's terrorist attacks could be attributed to the British government's "excessive emphasis on human rights above security." Chen Quanguo, Party Secretary of Xinjiang, said that struggling against terror and safeguarding stability was a "protracted war" and a "war of offense."

=== Reports of population control and surveillance ===
The documents contain directives and reports on the surveillance and control of Uyghur Muslims in Xinjiang. According to the leaked papers, the detention and surveillance of Uyghur Muslims expanded rapidly after the appointment of Chen Quanguo as the Party Secretary of Xinjiang in 2016. Chen ordered officers to "prepare for a smashing, obliterating offensive" and "round up everyone who should be rounded up." This included the detention of anyone with "symptoms of religious radicalism or antigovernment views", including giving up smoking or drinking, wearing long beards, praying outside mosques, and studying Arabic.

The documents contain a script for local officials in Turpan to use in order to answer questions asked by the children of parents sent to camps. Officials were instructed to tell returning students that their parents were in a "training school set up by the government" because they had been "infected by unhealthy thoughts." If students asked why their parents could not come home, officials were to say that they needed to "undergo enclosed, isolated treatment", and their unhealthy thoughts needed to be "dealt with like detox for drug addicts." Students were instructed to "not believe or spread rumors" and "abide by the states' laws and rules", which could then "add points" for their relatives and shorten their detentions.

=== Internal investigations into local officials ===
The documents state that the detention campaign faced doubts and resistance from local officials, some of whom were purged or jailed. They specifically mention Wang Yongzhi, the former Party Secretary of Yarkand County. Wang privately disagreed with the scale of the detentions and ordered the release of over 7,000 inmates, which allegedly led him to be stripped of power and imprisoned. According to The New York Times, the party "made an example" of Wang to show they would not tolerate any resistance to their campaign.

== Publication by The New York Times ==
On November 16, 2019, Ramzy and Buckley of The New York Times published the Xinjiang papers in an article titled "'Absolutely No Mercy': Leaked Files Expose How China Organized Mass Detention of Muslims". The documents were published along with translated excerpts and their own analysis. Ramzy and Buckley state that the documents were provided by a Chinese government official who requested anonymity and hoped to "prevent party leaders, including Mr. Xi, from escaping culpability for the mass detentions."

The publication of the Xinjiang papers was followed by the China Cables leak a few days later. Other documents allegedly leaked from Chinese government sources include the Aksu List and the Karakax List. Following the Xinjiang papers leak, the Xinjiang regional government ordered government officials to tighten control on sensitive information by deleting data, destroying documents, and restricting information transfer.

Along with other reports of Uyghur repression in China, "Absolutely No Mercy: Leaked Files Expose How China Organized Mass Detention of Muslims" was nominated for a Pulitzer Prize in 2020 under the International Reporting category.

== Reactions ==
=== Domestic ===
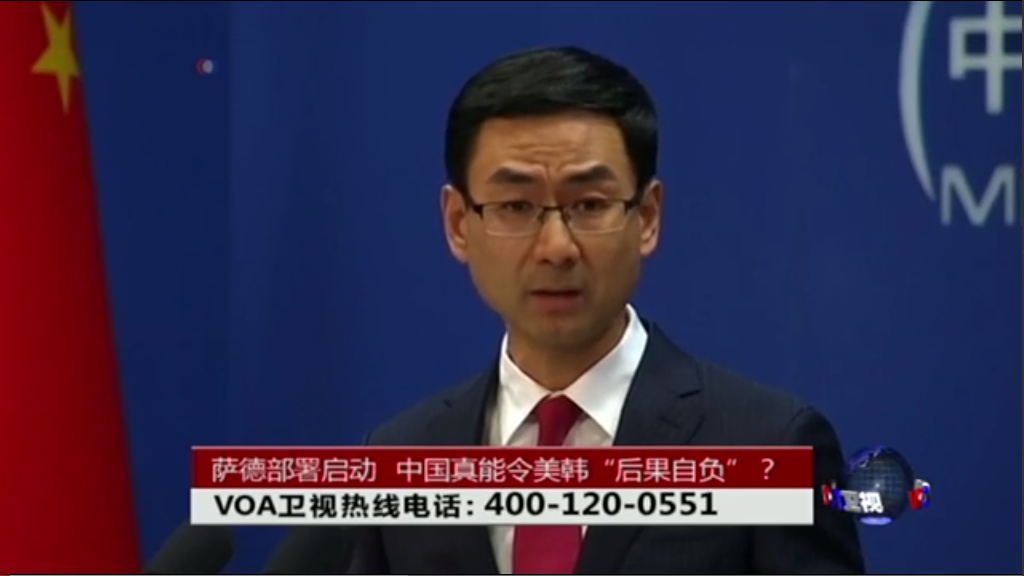
Geng in a press conference in 2017

China's Ministry of Foreign Affairs spokesman Geng Shuang responded to The New York Times report in a press conference on November 18, 2019. Geng said that Xinjiang-related issues are purely domestic affairs and the government's measures "have been endorsed by all ethnic groups." Geng accused The New York Times of using "clumsy patchwork and distortion" to "hype up the so-called 'internal documents'" and "smear China's counter-terrorism and de-radicalization efforts."

A spokesperson for the Xinjiang regional government stated that the report was "full of nonsense, lies, and sinister intentions" and was "completely fabricated." China's ambassador to the United Kingdom described the documents as "sheer, pure fabrication".

While The New York Times said that Wang Yongzhi was arrested for refusing to carry out detentions, a 2018 report from China Daily wrote that Wang was removed for "serious disciplinary violations" including "bribery, corruption, and abuse of power." Following The New York Times publication, some netizens shared the article on Chinese platform Sina Weibo and wrote tributes to him on social media.

=== International ===
==== Australia ====
Australian Foreign Minister Marise Payne called The New York Times report "disturbing" and stated that it reinforced Australia's resolve to raise their human rights concerns with Beijing. Penny Wong, foreign affairs spokesperson for the Australian Labor Party, called the report "deeply disturbing" and urged China to respond "transparently and swiftly." Australian Greens leader Richard Di Natale described the report as "horrifying" and stated that Australia needed to "play an active diplomatic role in putting maximum pressure on China."

==== Canada ====
Citing evidence from the "Chinese Government's own documents, satellite imagery, and eyewitness testimony", Global Affairs Canada issued a joint statement with the United Kingdom calling for China to end its "human rights violations and abuses" in Xinjiang. Canada called on China to allow independent members of the international community to investigate the situation in Xinjiang. In coordination with the UK and other international partners, Canada announced business measures to address human rights abuses in Xinjiang. These measures include the prohibition of imports produced by forced labor, a Xinjiang Integrity Declaration for Canadian companies, and the issuance of a third-party analysis on forced labor and supply chain risks.

==== United Kingdom ====
Following the Xinjiang papers and China Cables leaks, the UK cited the "Chinese authorities' own government documents" as evidence of human rights violations against Uyghur Muslims, including forced labor and extrajudicial detention. In coordination with international partners, including Canada, the UK announced business measures to ensure that UK organizations are not "contributing to the abuse of the Uyghur Muslims in Xinjiang." This includes a review of export controls to Xinjiang and the introduction of financial penalties for organizations violating the Modern Slavery Act.

==== United States ====
In a press conference on November 26, 2019, Secretary of State Mike Pompeo said that the Xinjiang papers "detail the Chinese party's brutal detention and systematic repression of Uyghurs." Pompeo said that the documents align with a growing body of evidence that China is committing human rights violations. He called for the Chinese government to end its policies in Xinjiang and "immediately release all those who are arbitrarily detained." In a speech to the United States Senate, Senate Majority Leader Mitch McConnell called the leaked documents a "handbook for [an] Orwellian campaign to effectively erase a religious and ethnic minority."

Several US politicians retweeted the article by The New York Times, including Joe Biden, Ilhan Omar, Chuck Schumer, and Elizabeth Warren. Biden described China's treatment of Uyghur Muslims as "among the worst abuses of human rights in the world today", while Omar called the documents a "chilling portrait of the Chinese government's campaign of mass detention and ethnic cleansing." Schumer wrote that the Xinjiang papers "exposes the Chinese Communist Party's lies" and reveals a "brutal [and] repressive campaign" against Uyghur Muslims. Warren described China's treatment of Uyghur Muslims as a "horrifying human rights violation" and said that "we must stand up to hatred and extremism at home -- and around the world."

Several US lawmakers cited the Xinjiang papers in calling for the passage of the Uyghur Human Rights Policy Act, which condemns human rights violations in Xinjiang and calls for sanctions against Chen Quanguo. The Uyghur Human Rights Policy Act was signed into law by President Donald Trump on June 17, 2020. Under the Global Magnitsky Act, the US has imposed sanctions on Chen Quanguo, Zhu Hailun, and two other government officials "in connection with serious human rights abuses" in Xinjiang.

The Xinjiang papers leak also prompted calls for the US to boycott the 2022 Beijing Winter Olympics. While US Department of State spokesman Ned Price said the US wished to discuss a possible boycott with allies to object to China's treatment of Uyghur Muslims, the State Department has denied that any discussions had been ongoing.

== Allegations of human rights violations ==
The Xinjiang papers leak contributed to accusations of extrajudicial detention and genocide against the Chinese government. According to the Australian Strategic Policy Institute, the documents demonstrate the "scale and depth of Beijing's Xinjiang program" and make it difficult for China to deny allegations of Uyghur and Muslim persecution.

Some claim that the documents constitute a "direct linkage" between CCP leadership and human rights abuses in Xinjiang. Dolkun Isa, president of the World Uyghur Congress, said that the papers "reveal a premeditated policy from the highest levels of the Chinese government to eradicate our identity." According to an article in International Security, the Xinjiang papers "confirm the importance of terrorism in the minds of senior party leaders, including Xi Jinping."

The Xinjiang papers have been cited as evidence of Uyghur genocide by the Chinese government against Uyghur Muslims. Along with other leaked documents, the publication of the Xinjiang papers led to increased attention and scrutiny of China's camps in Xinjiang.

== See also ==
- Antireligious campaigns in China
- China Cables, November 2019 data leak
- Racism in China
- Human rights in China
- Persecution of Uyghurs in China
- Xinjiang conflict
- Xinjiang Police Files, May 2022 data leak
