= Xinjiang Zhongtai Group =

Chinese state-owned business group

Xinjiang Zhongtai Group (Chinese: 新疆中泰集团有限责任公司) is a state-owned business group in China. It was founded in 2001 and has been listed among the Fortune Global 500 companies. The group has been listed in the Shenzhen stock market since 2006, and as of 2019 officially had 22,700 employees. It operates investment, asset management, and other businesses.

The involvement in forced Uyghur labour brought the company international attention and US sanctions.

The company is mostly producing PVC, ionic membrane caustic soda, calcium carbide and further chemicals, causing multiple environmental and health hazards. They are also involved in textile and agricultural production in Xinjiang and produce 20% of China's cotton.

The group has 43 wholly owned subsidiaries, making it difficult to oversee its activities. It runs at least 32 subsidiaries manufacturing clothes, including the Xinjiang Linhua group, responsible for expropriation and Guangzhou Zhongtai New Material Co. (广东中泰新 材料科技有限公司).

== Human rights violations ==
The Zhongtai Group is responsible for the transfer of more than 5,000 citizens to be "surplus laborers." Confirmed by state media and corporate publicity. Zhongtai is involved in reeducation programs. They operate ideological and vocational training facilities passed by thousands of rural farmers. There they teach vocational skills, anti-terrorism, labor discipline, ethnic unity, patriotism, cultural skills and legal knowledge, as well how "to bear hardships and stand hard work." They make use of these workers at Zhongtai and other local companies.

There is evidence for about 1,000 people being forced to work at Zhongtai's Aral Fulida cotton and viscose processing plant. Xinjiang Lihua Cotton Industry Co. also profited from land transfers of indigenous lands, retrieved by the state. Between 2017 and March 2018 alone they transferred about 1.95 million mu of Uyghur Region residents' land, involving thousands of farmers. In Shayar Country, Lihua 'accompanied' farmers in investing their land in cooperatives, who then transferred the land to the company for unified management. The farmers, landless and jobless, are then transferred to work in the factories. Through this system the company justifies the transfer of former farmers to their factories.

== International affairs ==
The US Department of Homeland Security put the company on a list of sanctioned companies in September 2023 because of their use of Uyghurs, Kazakhs, Kyrgyz, or members of other persecuted groups by forced labour in Xinjiang region.

They co-operate with the German BASF, one of the biggest global suppliers of chemicals.
