= Frank N. Pieke =

Dutch anthropologist

Frank Nikolaas Pieke (born 23 September 1957 in Amsterdam) is a Dutch cultural anthropologist and expert on modern China. He was director and CEO of the Mercator Institute for China Studies (MERICS) in Berlin but served less than two years of what was meant to be a five year term.

== Life ==
Frank N. Pieke studied cultural anthropology and Chinese studies at the University of Amsterdam and the University of California, Berkeley, where he received his PhD in cultural anthropology in 1992.

From 1995 to 2010, Pieke taught Modern Politics and Society of China at St Cross College, University of Oxford. He was the founding director of the Oxford China Centre from 2007 to 2010. In 2010 he was appointed as the chair professor of Modern China Studies at Leiden University in the Netherlands. From 2016 to 2017, he served as academic director of the Leiden University Institute of Area Studies. He was also the director of the LeidenAsiaCentre from 2013 to 2018.

On May 24, 2018, Stiftung Mercator announced that Frank N. Pieke would become the new director of the MERICS in Berlin. Pieke assumed his position on August 1, 2018 but left again before the end of his term after less than two years.

In 2021–2022, he was a Fellow at the Swedish Collegium for Advanced Study in Uppsala, Sweden.

== Selected works ==
Knowing China. A Twenty-First Century Guide. Cambridge: Cambridge University Press, 2016, ISBN 978-1-107587618.

The Good Communist: Elite Training and State Building in Today’s China. Cambridge: Cambridge University Press, 2009, ISBN 978-1-107587618.

Transnational Chinese: Fujianese Migrants in Europe. Stanford: Stanford University Press, 2004, ISBN 978-0804749947.
