= Sebastian Heilmann =

German political scientist and sinologist

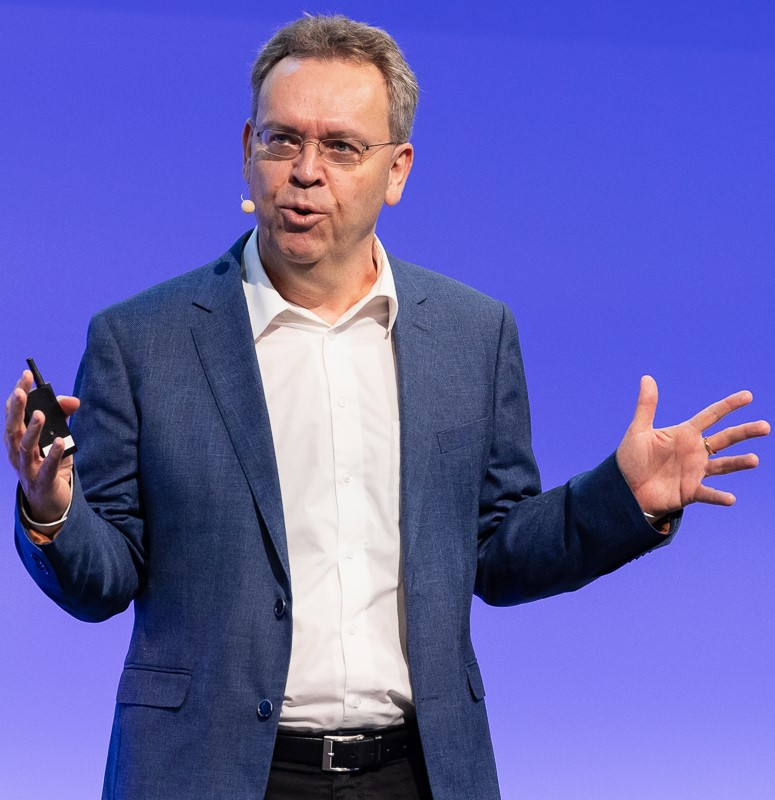
Sebastian Heilmann (2025)

Sebastian Heilmann (born 1965 in Offenbach am Main) is a German political scientist and sinologist and has been a professor at the University of Trier since 1999. From 2013 to 2018 he was the founding director of the Mercator Institute for China Studies (MERICS), established by the Stiftung Mercator to conduct policy-oriented China research and communicate its findings to the public.

== Life ==
Heilmann studied political science, sinology and comparative linguistics from 1984 to 1990 in Tübingen and Nanjing (PRC). He subsequently conducted research at Stanford University and in Beijing.

In 1993, Heilmann received his doctorate under Jürgen Domes at the Faculty of Law and Economics of the Saarland University.

From 1994 to 1999, he was a research fellow on Chinese politics at the Institute of Asian Studies in Hamburg. During this time, he led several externally funded projects and advised, among others, the Federal Government, the Federal President’s Office, the Senate and Parliament in Hamburg, as well as political foundations. In 1999, Heilmann completed his habilitation at the University of Münster and subsequently taught there as a private lecturer for a short period of time. In the same year, he received a professorship in political science with a focus on East Asia at the University of Trier.

From 2000 to 2006, Heilmann led the Research Group on Equity Market Regulation (REGEM) at the University of Trier, with the participation of financial market actors from Luxembourg and Frankfurt. In 2005–2006, he was a guest researcher at the Fairbank Center at Harvard University, where he studied Chinese economic and innovation policy. In 2007 and 2009 he served as “Coordinate Scholar” at the Harvard-Yenching Institute in a multi-year research and publication project on the foundations of “adaptive authoritarianism” in China. In 2011/2012 he was a Visiting Fellow at the University of Oxford (Merton College and China Centre).

From 2010 to 2013, he headed a project group on "Industry and Technology Policy of the PRC" funded by the German Federal Ministry of Education and Research. In 2012, Heilmann was appointed to the editorial board of The China Quarterly. From 2013 to August 2018, he founded and directed the Berlin-based Mercator Institute for China Studies (MERICS), which developed into the largest China-focused think tank in Europe.

From 2014 to 2018, Heilmann was one of 15 German representatives in the German-Chinese Dialogue Forum. This advisory forum was founded in 2005 by the governments of both countries to promote broad non-governmental dialogue and bilateral confidence-building.

Heilmann’s research and publications focus on China’s political system, China’s international relations, as well as economic and innovation policy. In 2018 he announced that, for family reasons, he would return to his professorship at the University of Trier. Since 2019, he has focused his teaching, research and public speaking on geopolitical and geoeconomic issues, particularly the consequences of China’s global rise for trade, supply chains, infrastructure and technologies.

== Research interests ==
- Political system and economic policy in the PR China.
- China’s foreign policy and external economic relations.
- Policy innovation through experimental programs in international comparison.
- Geopolitical and geoeconomic dynamics in the US-China-EU triangle.

== Reception ==
International reviews have highlighted Heilmann’s research contributions with regards to the Chinese Communist Party (CCP)'s political system and Chinese industrial, innovation, and development policy. The China Review described him as "one of Europe's most renowned China experts". The New York Review of Books praised the volume Mao’s Invisible Hand, co-edited by Heilmann with Elizabeth J. Perry (Harvard University), as “one of those books that make one feel good about scholarship”. The book examined the foundations of the Chinese political system’s unexpected adaptability and resilience, in obvious contrast to the demise of the party states in Eastern Europe in 1989–91. The Journal of Asian Studies characterized Mao’s Invisible Hand as “breathtaking overview of China’s adaptive governance” and a “revolutionary new perspective on today’s Chinese state and its continuities with the past.” His edited work China's Political System (2016) was characterized by the International Institute for Asian Studies as "a comprehensive, authoritative account of the contemporary political landscape of the Middle Kingdom". His book Red Swan: How Unorthodox Policy-Making Facilitated China's Rise (2018) has been described as: "well argued and provocative" for specialists and at the same time "informative and digestible" for a broader readership.

Writing with Elizabeth Perry, Heilmann contends that policy-making in China is influenced by the Chinese Communist Revolution, resulting in a policy approach that combined centralized leadership with intense mass mobilization, and that this mode of governance is defined by continuous experimentation and improvisation. Heilmann writes that the state's "unusual adaptive capacity" in economic matters is attributable to an "institutional structure that ... enables it to try out alternative approaches to overcome long-standing impediments to economic development, tackle newly emerging challenges, and grasp opportunities when they open up."

Heilmann’s theses have not remained uncontested. Critics warn against portraying China’s policy approaches as exceptional or unique. Local policy experiments are not limited to China but are also common in Western political systems – the difference lies more in implementation than in a singular concept. Beyond these debates, Heilmann has also faced political criticism. Chinese state media in particular reacted sensitively to his commentaries and studies on Chinese industrial policy. His 2015 thesis that under General Secretary of the Chinese Communist Party Xi Jinping there was a “reverse thrust” and departure from the reform and opening course – with “serious consequences for the economic and social exchanges of Western countries with China” – was hotly debated and criticized in German foreign policy and business circles.

During his tenure as founding director of the Mercator Institute for China Studies (MERICS), a study on the Chinese industrial and innovation program "Made in China 2025" received sharp criticism from Chinese state-affiliated media. The study explicitly warned that the Chinese plans posed an immediate threat to German and European industrial bases. The Global Times subsequently accused MERICS of biased research and called its researchers "misguided academics".

== Selected publications ==
- Geoeconomics: How Geopolitical Rivalries Reshape Global Markets, Berlin: GeoEcon Publishing. (co-authored with Bastian M. Dürr)
- Red Swan: How Unorthodox Policy-Making Facilitated China's Rise. Hong Kong: Chinese University Press, 2018.
- China's Political System (editor). Lanham, Boulder, New York, London: Rowman & Littlefield, 2017. ISBN 978-1442277342
- China’s Core Executive: Leadership Styles, Structures and Processes under Xi Jinping, MERICS Papers on China 1, Berlin, 2016. (co-edited with Matthias Stepan)
- China’s Foreign Political and Economic Relations: An Unconventional Global Power (co-authored with Dirk H. Schmidt). Lanham, Maryland: Rowman &Littlefield, 2014.
- “The Reinvention of Development Planning in China, 1993-2012” (co-authored with Oliver Melton), Modern China, November 2013.
- Mao’s Invisible Hand: The Political Foundations of Adaptive Governance in China (co-edited with Elizabeth J. Perry). Cambridge, Mass.: Harvard University Press, 2011.
- “Policy Experimentation in China’s Economic Rise”, Studies in Comparative International Development, March 2008.
- The Political System of the PRC [in German]. Wiesbaden: Springer VS, two editions, 2002 and 2004.
- The Politics of Economic Reform in China and Russia [in German]. Hamburg: German Institute for Asian Affairs, 2000.
