= Xinjiang Police Files =

2022 leaked documents

- Zenz's article on the Xinjiang Police Files
- Location: China: Konasheher County, Kashgar Prefecture, Xinjiang Uyghur Autonomous Region
- Type: Data breach
- Target: Xinjiang re-education camps
- Participants: Adrian Zenz; Anonymous hackers
- Website: www.xinjiangpolicefiles.org
- Photo collection of "students" and extensive background information

The Xinjiang Police Files are said to be leaked documents from the Xinjiang re-education camps, forwarded to anthropologist Adrian Zenz from an anonymous source. On 24 May 2022, an international consortium of 14 media groups (Note: 14 media companies: Aftenposten; Bayerischer Rundfunk; BBC News; Dagens Nyheter; Der Spiegel; El País; ICIJ; Le Monde; L'Espresso; Mainichi Shimbun; NHK World-Japan; Politiken; USA Today; Yle) published information about the files, which consist of over 10 gigabytes of speeches, images, spreadsheets and protocols dating back to 2018.

The Xinjiang Police Files were published at the same time as the UN Human Rights Commissioner Michelle Bachelet started her visit to China on May 23. Her briefing included exploring the situation of the Uyghurs in Xinjiang as part of the visit.

== Background ==
According to estimates by U.N. and U.S. officials, one million Uyghurs and other Turkic groups were held in Chinese government camps in 2018. The existence of China's "re-education" and an extrajudicial program for mass detention were first detected in satellite photos, and testimonies from Uyghur refugees. The documents of the leak were collected during the mass detention program's highest level of intensity.

Initially, China denied the existence of Xinjiang camps; in 2018, the Chinese government started referring to the camps as "vocational training schools", and that attendance was voluntary. China has also referred to the system as a "de-radicalization" program.

A previous investigation into Xinjiang by a large group of media organisations occurred in 2019, and was released under the name China Cables. This leak, based on classified Chinese government documents, exposed the operations manual for Xinjiang detention camps and the region's system of mass surveillance. The Xinjiang Police Files leak is the second major data leak related to Xinjiang, after more than 400 pages of internal documents were leaked in 2019.

The Xinjiang Police Files documents were obtained by Adrian Zenz, a senior fellow at the Victims of Communism Memorial Foundation, who subsequently shared the documents with a group of 14 news organizations. According to Zenz, the files were made available through a "hacking attack directly on police computers and even computers in detention camps" and from public security bureau computer systems in Ili and Kashgar governorates in Xinjiang. The data was evaluated over several weeks by joint research by the media consortium and partially checked for authenticity.

The leak coincided with the first visit by a U.N. human rights diplomat since 2005. According to Zenz, the timing was not intentional.

== Contents ==
The Xinjiang Police Files contain thousands of pictures and documents from the Xinjiang counties of Konasheher and Tekes, and contains details of the internment of more than 20,000 Uyghurs. The files contradict China's official reading that the mass internment facilities are "professional training facilities" visited voluntarily, which served to fight poverty and were directed against extremist ideas.

According to media reports, these Chinese government data, classified as "confidential" or "internal," including thousands of analyzed documents, photos, transcripts of speeches by senior party officials, official orders, and training materials, showed the extent of the persecution and mass detentions in Xinjiang in 2018.

As of May 2022, the Xinjiang Police Files were the most comprehensive publicized leak on the state re-education camps in Xinjiang. Zenz wrote a journal article based on the contents of the files, titled The Xinjiang Police Files: Re-Education Camp Security and Political Paranoia in the Xinjiang Uyghur Autonomous Region, published in the Journal of the European Association for Chinese Studies on May 24.

=== Documents ===
The documents in the leak include confidential government documents, as well as speeches by top Chinese officials, and internal police documents and tutorials.

Two documents from June 2018 are transcripts of speeches by Zhao Kezhi and Chen Quanguo. One document, marked "confidential", outlines what surveillance measures are to be implemented in Yili during a visit of European diplomats, and directed security officers to "strictly" monitor their contacts and work. The files include details of protocols governing policing at the facilities, making it clear that there are armed officers throughout the camps, and that watchtowers contain machine gun posts and sniper rifles.

In the protocols, blindfolds, handcuffs and shackles are specified for any transfers of detainees, either between facilities or externally, for example to hospital. The leak also details a "shoot-to-kill" policy for anyone trying to escape. This was issued by Chen Quanguo, in his role as Xinjiang's party secretary and member of the Politburo of the Chinese Communist Party at the time in 2018. Chen also called for officials to "exercise firm control over religious believers".

Another document, labeled among the "most striking" by the International Consortium of Investigative Journalists (ICIJ), are spreadsheets containing information on 8,000 detainees in Konasheher. According to the leak, at least one of the camps in Konasheher has cells for holding detainees in solitary confinement, and the documents indicate that more than 10,000 people in Konasheher county were recommended for detention, or closer examination, via the Integrated Joint Operations Platform. The files include a list titled "relatives of the detained", which, taken with other information, indicates widespread use of "guilt by association". One 16 year old was apparently held captive due to being related to other detained persons.

One document is a spreadsheet titled "persons subjected to strike hard because of religion"; it lists 330 people sentenced because of religious activities deemed illegal, such as studying the Quran.

=== Images ===
Among the pictures included in the leak are mugshots of over 2,800 people, with some of the pictures showing "dazed men, women and teenagers staring blankly into camera". In total, the set contains 5,074 mugshots photographed between January and July 2018, possibly to collect biometric data. According to Zenz's analysis, about 2,900 had been detained before the pictures were taken, and range from 15 and 73 in age. 15 of the detainees were minors.

Besides mugshots, other images are included. Among them are pictures of interrogations, with one photo showing a young man with hands and feet shackled to a "tiger chair", surrounded by heavily armored guards. Rahile Omer, a 15-year-old girl who had been arrested in 2017 at the age of 14, was identified as being the youngest detainee included in the leak.

Anomalies found on the edges of the mugshots, particularly the bottom edge, were addressed in a BBC report on the files stating that the images were rotated to allow for better integration in facial recognition software.

== Reactions ==
According to the International Consortium of Investigative Journalists, the leak is "irrefutable evidence of the highly militarized nature of the camps and present a stark contrast with those, previously published, that were taken on government-organized press tours", as well as stating that "taken together, the photographs and documents refute the Chinese government's claims that the camps are merely 'educational centers'".

The Chinese government has denied accusations of human rights violations, calling them "fabricated lies and disinformation", and stating what they call "training centers" are used to aid poverty and "de-radicalize" extremists. Liu Pengyu, a spokesman for the Chinese embassy in Washington D.C., told ICIJ that "Xinjiang has taken a host of decisive, robust and effective deradicalization measures". Chinese foreign ministry spokesperson Wang Wenbin called the leak "the latest example of anti-China forces trying to smear China", stating "[i]t is just a repetition of their old tricks. Spreading rumours and lies won't cloud the judgment of the world and cannot cover up the fact that Xinjiang enjoys stability and prosperity, and residents there are living happy and fulfilling lives".

On May 23, 2022, British Foreign Secretary Liz Truss asked for "unfettered access to the region so that [Bachelet] can conduct a thorough assessment of the facts on the ground". She also stated that the leaked files contained "shocking details of China's human rights violations"

German foreign minister Annalena Baerbock called for a transparent investigation after “shocking reports and new evidence of very serious human rights violations in Xinjiang”. German minister of the economy Robert Habeck called the latest leak "particularly shocking".

On May 29, 2022, US Secretary of State Antony Blinken said "genocide and crimes against humanity are ongoing" in Xinjiang province, and that China "restricted and manipulated" UN Human Rights Commissioner Michelle Bachelet's visit. Linda Thomas-Greenfield, US ambassador to the United Nations, tweeted: "Horrified by the Xinjiang Police Files, which spotlight China's mass incarceration of Uyghurs and other ethnic and religious minorities."

== See also ==
- China Cables, November 2019
- Xinjiang papers, November 2019
- Xinjiang Victims Database
- Xinjiang Person Search Tool, a search engine launched by Adam Zenz and the Victims of Communism Memorial Foundation that leverages the leaked files to allow family members to directly search for imprisoned relatives by their Chinese ID or name.
