= Xinjiang re-education camps =

Chinese prison camps in the Xinjiang region

- Indoctrination camps, labor camps
- Detainees listening to speeches in a camp in Lop County, Xinjiang, April 2017
- Other names: Vocational Education and Training Center
- Location: Xinjiang, China
- Built by: Chinese Communist Party; Government of China
- Operated by: Xinjiang Uyghur Autonomous Regional People's Government and the Party Committee
- Operational: 2014–2019
- Number of inmates: Up to 1.8 million (2020 Zenz estimate); Plus ~497,000 minors in special boarding schools (2017 government document estimate)

Xinjiang internment camps

Uyghur name
- Uyghur: قايتا تەربىيەلەش لاگېرلىرى
Transcriptions
- Latin Yëziqi: Qayta terbiyelesh lagérliri
- Siril Yëziqi: Қайта тәрбийәләш лагерлири

Xinjiang re-education camps
- Simplified Chinese: 再教育营
- Traditional Chinese: 再教育營
Transcriptions
Standard Mandarin
- Hanyu Pinyin: zàijiàoyù yíng

Vocational Education and Training Centers
- Simplified Chinese: 职业技能教育培训中心
- Traditional Chinese: 職業技能教育培訓中心
- Literal meaning: Vocational Skill(s) Education-Training Center(s)
Transcriptions
Standard Mandarin
- Hanyu Pinyin: zhíyè jìnéng jiàoyù péixùn zhōngxīn

Xinjiang re-education camps, (Note: sometimes referred to as concentration camps) officially called Vocational Education and Training Centers, (Note: Chinese: 职业技能教育培训中心; pinyin: Zhíyè jìnéng jiàoyù péixùn zhōngxīn; Wade–Giles: Chih²yeh⁴ chi⁴neng² chiao⁴yü⁴ p'ei²hsün⁴ chung¹hsin¹) were facilities operated by the government of Xinjiang and the Xinjiang Uygur Autonomous Regional Committee of the Chinese Communist Party.

The camps were established in 2017 by the administration of CCP general secretary Xi Jinping. Human Rights Watch says that they have been used to indoctrinate Uyghurs since 2017 as part of a "Strike Hard Campaign Against Violent Terrorism", a campaign announced in 2014 after the May 2014 Ürümqi attack. Operations were led by CCP Politburo member and Xinjiang Party secretary Chen Quanguo. The camps were reportedly operated outside the Chinese legal system; many Uyghurs have reportedly been interned without trial and no charges have been levied against them (held in administrative detention). Local authorities were reported to be holding hundreds of thousands of Uyghurs in these camps as well as members of other ethnic minority groups in China, for the stated purpose of countering extremism and terrorism and promoting social integration. In September 2020, the Australian Strategic Policy Institute (ASPI) reported in its Xinjiang Data Project that construction of camps continued despite government claims that their function was winding down. According to researcher Adrian Zenz, mass internments peaked in 2018 and have wound down since then, with officials shifting focus towards forced labor programs. In 2019, the Chinese government claimed the centers have been closed. Individuals in the camps have been shifted into the formal penal system, with remaining camps being converted into prisons or factories using forced labor.

Xinjiang re-education camps have been described as "the most extreme example of China's inhumane policies against Uighurs". The imprisonment of Uyghurs and other Turkic Muslims in the camps constituted the largest-scale arbitrary detention of ethnic and religious minorities since World War II. In 2020, it was estimated that Chinese authorities may have detained up to 1.8 million people, mostly Uyghurs but also including Kazakhs, Kyrgyz and other ethnic Turkic Muslims, Christians, as well as some foreign citizens including Kazakhstanis, in these secretive re-education camps located throughout the region. There have been comparisons between the Xinjiang camps and the Cultural Revolution.

== Background ==
=== Xinjiang conflict ===
Various Chinese dynasties have historically exerted various degrees of control and influence over parts of what is modern-day Xinjiang. The region came under complete Chinese rule as a result of the westward expansion of the Manchu-led Qing dynasty, which also conquered Tibet and Mongolia. This conquest, which marked the beginning of Xinjiang under Qing rule, ended circa 1758. While it was nominally declared to be a part of China's core territory, it was generally seen as a distant land unto its own by the imperial court; in 1758, it was designated a penal colony and a site of exile, and as a result, it was governed as a military protectorate, not integrated as a province.

After the 1928 assassination of Yang Zengxin, the governor of the semi-autonomous Kumul Khanate in east Xinjiang under the Republic of China, Jin Shuren succeeded Yang as governor of the Khanate. On the death of the Kamul Khan Maqsud Shah in 1930, Jin entirely abolished the Khanate and took control of the region as its warlord. In 1933, the breakaway First East Turkestan Republic was established in the Kumul Rebellion. In 1934, the First Turkestan Republic was conquered by warlord Sheng Shicai with the aid of the Soviet Union before Sheng reconciled with the Republic of China in 1942. In 1944, the Ili Rebellion led to the Second East Turkestan Republic with dependency on the Soviet Union for trade, arms, and "tacit consent" for its continued existence before being absorbed into the People's Republic of China in 1949.

From the 1950s to the 1970s, the government sponsored a mass migration of Han people to the region, policies promoting Chinese cultural unity, and policies punishing certain expressions of Uyghur identity. During this time, militant Uyghur separatist organizations with potential support from the Soviet Union emerged, with the East Turkestan People's Revolutionary Party being the largest in 1968. During the 1970s, the United Revolutionary Front of East Turkestan (URFET) was likely formed with Soviet assistance, and its leader later met with U.S. State Department officials in 1996.

In 1997, a police roundup and execution of 30 suspected separatists during Ramadan led to large demonstrations in February 1997 that resulted in the Ghulja incident, a People's Liberation Army (PLA) crackdown that led to at least nine deaths. The Ürümqi bus bombings later that month killed nine people and injured 68 with responsibility acknowledged by Uyghur exile groups. In March 1997, a bus bomb killed two people with responsibility claimed by Uyghur radicals and the Turkey-based Organisation for East Turkistan Freedom.

In July 2009, riots broke out in Xinjiang in response to a violent dispute between Uyghur and Han workers in a factory and they resulted in over 100 deaths. Following the riots, Uyghur radicals killed dozens of Chinese citizens in coordinated attacks from 2009 to 2016. These included the August 2009 syringe attacks, the 2011 bomb-and-knife attack in Hotan, the March 2014 knife attack in the Kunming railway station, the April 2014 bomb-and-knife attack in the Ürümqi railway station, and the May 2014 car-and-bomb attack in an Ürümqi street market. Several of the attacks were orchestrated by the Turkistan Islamic Party (formerly the East Turkestan Islamic Movement) which has been designated a terrorist organization by several countries including Russia, Turkey, the United Kingdom, and the United States (until 2020), in addition to the United Nations.

=== Strategic motivations ===
As a region on the northwestern periphery of China which is inhabited by ethnic/linguistic/religious minorities, Xinjiang has been said (by Raffi Khatchadourian) to have "never seemed fully within the Communist Party's grasp". Part of Xinjiang was once seized by Czarist Russia and it was also independent for a short period of time. Traditionally, the government of the People's Republic of China has favored an assimilationist policy towards minorities and it has accelerated this policy by encouraging the mass immigration of Han people into minority lands. After the collapse of its rival and neighbor the Soviet Union—another huge multi-national communist state with one dominant ethnicity—the Chinese Communist Party was "convinced that ethnic nationalism had helped tear the former superpower to pieces". In addition, terrorist attacks were committed by Uyghurs in 2009, 2013, and 2014.

Several additional potential motives for the increased repression in Xinjiang have been presented by scholars who have conducted research outside China. First, the repression may simply be the result of increased dissent within the region beginning in circa 2009; second, it may be due to changes in minority policy which promoted assimilation into Han culture; and third, the repression may primarily be spearheaded by Chen Quanguo himself, the result of his personally hardline attitude towards perceived acts of sedition. Victor Shih, a political economist at the University of California, San Diego, said in July 2019 the mass internments were unnecessary because "no active insurgencies" existed, only "isolated terrorist incidents". He suggested that because a great deal of money was spent setting up the camps, the money likely went to associates of the politicians who created them.

China's government has used the terrorist attacks of September 11, 2001, in the United States as a justification for its actions against the Uyghurs. It claims that its actions in Xinjiang are necessary because Xinjiang is another front in the "global war on terrorism". Specifically, they say they are trying to rid China of the Shanghai Cooperation Organization's "three evils", which are "transnational terrorism, separatism, and religious extremism", all three of which the CCP says the Uyghurs possess. The true reason for the repression of the Uyghurs is more convoluted, but some argue that this is based on the CCP's desire to preserve China's identity and integrity, rather than its desire to condemn terrorism. Zhang Yun, the CCP Secretary of the Xinjiang Justice Department, suggested in 2015 that "a third" of Xinjiang's population were "polluted by religious extremist forces", and needed to be "educated and reformed through concentrated force".

Additionally, some analysts have suggested that the CCP considers Xinjiang a key route in China's Belt and Road Initiative (BRI), however, it considers Xinjiang's local population a potential threat to the initiative's success, or it fears that opening Xinjiang up may also open it up to radicalizing influences from other states which are participating in the BRI. Sean Roberts of George Washington University said the CCP sees Uyghurs' attachment to their traditional lands as a risk to the BRI. Researcher Adrian Zenz has suggested that the initiative is an important reason for the Chinese government's control of Xinjiang.

In November 2020, when the US dropped the Turkistan Islamic Party from its terrorist list because it was no longer "in existence", the decision was lauded by some intelligence officials because it removed the pretext for the Chinese government's decision to wage "terrorism eradication" campaigns against the Uyghurs. However, Yue Gang, a military commentator in Beijing stated, "in the wake of the US decision on the ETIM, China might seek to increase its counterterrorism activities." The group continues to be designated as a terrorist group by the United Nations Security Council as well as by the governments of other countries.

=== Policies from 2009 to 2016 ===
Number of re-education related government procurement bids in Xinjiang, 2016–2018, according to the Jamestown Foundation

Both prior to and until shortly after the July 2009 Ürümqi riots, Wang Lequan was the Party Secretary for the Xinjiang region, effectively the highest subnational role; roughly equivalent to a governor in a Western province or state. Wang worked on modernization programs in Xinjiang, including industrialization, development of commerce, roads, railways, hydrocarbon development and pipelines with neighboring Kazakhstan to eastern China. Wang also constrained local culture and religion, replaced the Uyghur language with Standard Mandarin as the medium of education in primary schools, and penalized or banned among government workers (in a region in which the government was a very large employer), the wearing of beards and headscarves, fasting during Ramadan and praying while on the job. In the 1990s, many Uyghurs in parts of Xinjiang could not speak Mandarin Chinese.

In April 2010, after the Ürümqi riots, Zhang Chunxian replaced Wang Lequan as the Communist Party chief. Zhang Chunxian continued and strengthened Wang's repressive policies. In 2011, Zhang proposed "modern culture leads the development in Xinjiang" as his policy statement and started to implement his modern culture propaganda. In 2012, he first mentioned the phrase "de-extremification" (Chinese: 去极端化) campaigns and started to educate "wild Imams" (野阿訇) and extremists (极端主义者).

In 2013, the Belt and Road Initiative was announced, a massive trade project at the heart of which is Xinjiang. In 2014, Chinese authorities announced a "people's war on terror" and local government introduced new restrictions, including a ban on long beards and wearing the burqa in public. In 2014, the concept of "transformation through education" began to be used in contexts outside of Falun Gong through the systematic "de-extremification" campaigns. Under Zhang, the CCP launched its "Strike Hard Campaign against Violent Terrorism" in Xinjiang.

In 2019, the World Bank investigated and eventually scaled back a $50 million loan it provided in 2015 suspected of being used partly for detention camps in Xinjiang.

In August 2016, Chen Quanguo, a well-known hardline Party Secretary of Tibet, took charge of the Xinjiang autonomous region. Chen was branded as responsible for a major component of Tibet's "subjugation" by critics.

Following Chen's arrival, local authorities recruited over 90,000 police officers in 2016 and 2017 – twice as many as they recruited in the past seven years, and laid out as many as 7,300 heavily guarded check points in the region. The province has come to be known as one of the most heavily policed regions of the world. English-language news reports have labelled the current regime in Xinjiang as the most extensive police state in the world.

Publishing in 2026, academic and commentator Barry Sautman, citing a 2019 article in Xinjiang Daily, claims that many detainees "were allowed weekends at home." In his book, Sautman asserts that claims of genocide against Uyghurs in China lack evidence, denying charges of forced sterilizations, family separations, boarding schools for Uyghur children, arbitrary detention, torture, mass imprisonment, colonial settlement in Xinjiang, and forced labor. Cornell University anthropologist Magnus Fiskesjö, who compiled the Uyghur Human Rights Project (UHRP), called Sautman's book a "genocide-denialist screed".

==== Antireligious campaigns ====
As a communist state, China does not have an official state religion, but its government recognizes five different religious denominations, namely Buddhism, Taoism, Islam, Catholicism, and Protestantism. In 2014, Western media outlets reported that it has conducted antireligious campaigns in order to promote atheism. According to The Washington Post, the CCP under Xi Jinping shifted its policies in favor of a so-called "Sinicization" of ethnic and religious minorities. The trend accelerated in 2018 when the National Ethnic Affairs Commission and the State Administration for Religious Affairs were placed under the control of the CCP's United Front Work Department.

==== Groups that are targeted for surveillance ====
In 2015, the Chinese state-security apparatus was developing a "Integrated Joint Operations Platform" (IJOP) to analyze information which was collected from its surveillance data. According to an analysis of this software by Human Rights Watch, a member of a minority group might be assessed by the IJOP as falling under one of 36 "person types" that could lead to arrest and internment in a re-education camp. Some of these person types included:

- people who do not use a mobile phone
- people who use the back door instead of the front
- people who consume an "unusual" amount of electricity
- people who have an "abnormal" beard
- people who socialize too little
- people who maintain "complex" relationships
- people who have a family member that exhibits some of these traits and so is "insufficiently loyal"

== History ==
Beginning in 2017, local media outlets generally referred to the facilities as "counter-extremism training centers" (Note: Chinese: 去极端化培训班; pinyin: Qù jíduān huà péixùn bān) and "education and transformation training centers". (Note: Chinese: 去教育转化培训中心; pinyin: Jiàoyù zhuǎnhuà péixùn zhōngxīn) Most of those facilities were converted from existing schools or other official buildings, although some of them were purpose-built. Assignment to a VETC was generally a consequence in lieau of a criminal charge or prosecution.

The heavily policed region and thousands of check points assisted and accelerated the detention of locals in the camps. In 2017, Xinjiang constituted 21% of all arrests in China despite comprising less than 2% of the national population, eight times more than the previous year. The judicial and other government bureaus of many cities and counties started to release a series of procurement and construction bids for those planned camps and facilities. Increasingly, massive detention centers were built up throughout the region and have been used to hold hundreds of thousands of people targeted for their religious practices and ethnicity.

In October 2018, the Standing Committee of the Xinjiang Uygur Autonomous Regional People's Congress revised the Xinjiang Uighur Autonomous Region Regulation on De-extremification, adding provisions such as that "institutions such as vocational skill education training centers should carry out trainings on the common national language, laws and regulations, and vocational skills, and carry out anti-extremist ideological education, and psychological and behavioral correction to promote thought transformation of trainees, and help them return to the society and family". CNN noted that "The updated law all but acknowledges the growing reports of mass detentions inside Xinjiang".

During the COVID-19 pandemic in mainland China, there were no reports of cases of the coronavirus in Xinjiang prisons or of conditions in the re-education camps. After program suspensions due to the 2019–20 coronavirus pandemic, Uyghur workers were reported to have been returned to other parts of Xinjiang and the rest of China to resume work beginning in March 2020. In September 2020, the Australian Strategic Policy Institute (ASPI) launched its Xinjiang Data Project, which reported that construction of camps continued despite claims that their function was winding down, with 380 camps and detention centers identified.

According to researcher Adrian Zenz, mass internments peaked in 2018 and have wound down since then, with officials shifting focus towards forced labor programs. In 2019, the Chinese government claimed the centers have been closed. Individuals in the camps have been shifted into the formal penal system, with remaining camps being converted into prisons or factories using forced labor.

=== Leaks and hacks ===
==== The New York Times leak ====
On 16 November 2019, The New York Times released an extensive leak of 400 pages of documents, sourced from a member of the Chinese government, in the hope that CCP General Secretary Xi Jinping would be held accountable for his actions. The New York Times stated that the leak suggests discontent inside the Communist Party relating to the crackdown in Xinjiang. The anonymous government official who leaked the documents did so with the intent that the disclosure "would prevent party leaders, including Mr. Xi, from escaping culpability for the mass detentions."

We must be as harsh as them and show absolutely no mercy. — Xi Jinping on the terror attacks in 2014, (translated from Mandarin Chinese)

One document was a manual aimed at communicating messages to Uyghur students who were returning home and would ask about their missing friends or relatives who had been interned in the camps. It said that government staff should acknowledge that the internees had not committed a crime and that "it is just that their thinking has been infected by unhealthy thoughts." Officials were directed to say that even grandparents and family members who seemed too old to carry out violence could not be spared.

The New York Times stated that speeches obtained show how Xi views risks to the party similar to the collapse of the Soviet Union, which The New York Times stated Xi "blamed on ideological laxity and spineless leadership." Concerned that violence in the Xinjiang region could damage social stability in the rest of China, Xi stated "social stability will suffer shocks, the general unity of people of every ethnicity will be damaged, and the broad outlook for reform, development and stability will be affected." Xi encouraged officials to study how the US responded following the September 11 attacks. Xi likened Islamic extremism alternately to a virus-like contagion and a dangerously addictive drug, and declared that addressing it would require "a period of painful, interventionary treatment."

The China Daily reported in 2018 that CCP official Wang Yongzhi was removed for "serious disciplinary violations". The New York Times obtained a copy of Wang's confession (which the report noted was likely signed under duress) and stated that The New York Times believed he was sacked for being too lenient on Uyghurs, for example his release of 7,000 detainees. Wang had told his superiors that he was concerned that the actions against the Uyghurs would breed discontent and thus result in greater violence in the future. The leaked documents stated, "he ignored the party central leadership's strategy for Xinjiang, and he went as far as brazen defiance. ... He refused, to round up everyone who should be rounded up". The article was discreetly shared on the Chinese platform Sina Weibo, where some netizens expressed sympathy for him. In 2017, there were more than 12,000 investigations into party members in Xinjiang for infractions or resistance in the "fight against separatism", which was more than 20 times the figure in the previous year.

==== ICIJ leak ====
On 24 November 2019, the International Consortium of Investigative Journalists (ICIJ) published the China Cables, consisting of six documents, an "operations manual" for running the camps and detailed use of predictive policing and artificial intelligence to target people and regulate life inside the camps.

Shortly after the publication of the China Cables, leaker Asiye Abdulaheb went on to provide Adrian Zenz with the "Karakax list", allegedly a Chinese government spreadsheet that tracks the rationale behind 311 of the internments at a "Vocational Training Internment Camp" in the seat of Karakax County in Xinjiang. The purpose of the list may have been to coordinate judgments on whether an individual should remain in internment; in some entries, the word "agree" was written beside a judgment. Records detail how subjects dress and pray, and how their relatives and acquaintances behave. One subject was interned because she wore a veil years ago; another was interned for clicking on a link to a foreign website; a third was interned for applying for a passport, despite posing "no practical risk" according to the spreadsheet. In general, the subjects on the Karakax list all have relatives living abroad, a category that reportedly leads to "almost certain internment". 149 subjects are documented as violating birth control policies. 116 of the subjects are listed without explanation as "untrustworthy"; for 88 of these, this "untrustworthy" label is the only reason listed for internment. Younger men, in particular, are often listed as "untrustworthy person born in a certain decade". 24 subjects are accused of formal crimes, including six terrorism-related allegations. Most of the subjects have been released, or scheduled for release, following the end of their one-year internment term; however, some of these are recommended for release into "industrial park employment", raising concerns about possible forced labor.

==== Xinjiang Police Files hack ====
The 'Xinjiang Police Files', a large body of police files derived from data found in a hack of a local computer server, was sent to the German anthropologist Adrian Zenz, who works for the Victims of Communism Memorial Foundation. Zenz has been sanctioned by the Chinese government since 2021. He has been instrumental in exposing the camp system in Xinjiang. The files and some English translations are partly accessible via their special homepage set up by this foundation or via the links to an academic repository in Zenz' article in the Journal of the European Association for Chinese Studies.

The data was evaluated by journalists from 14 media companies worldwide, including the British BBC, Le Monde in France and El País in Spain. In Germany, Bayerischer Rundfunk and Der Spiegel examined and researched the data. According to the evaluation of a number of digital forensic scientists and other experts, the Xinjiang Police Files come from the computers of the Chinese authorities. It is the largest data leak on Chinese state-run re-education camps that has been made public outside of China to date.

In May 2022, the BBC published summaries of the Xinjiang Police Files. The Xinjiang Police Files were published during the first visit by a UN human rights commissioner to China in 14 years. By combining the photographs of some 5,000 Uyghurs contained in the data with other data in the hack, details of over 2,800 detentions emerged. Other documents in the leak included police protocols for running an internment camp.

== Camp facilities ==
In urban areas, most of the camps were converted from existing vocational schools, CCP schools, ordinary schools or other official buildings, while in suburban or rural areas the majority of camps were specially built for the purposes of re-education. These camps were guarded by armed forces or special police and equipped with prison-like gates, surrounding walls, security fences, surveillance systems, watchtowers, guard rooms, and facilities for armed police. The Xinjiang Zhongtai Group is running some of the reeducation camps and uses reallocated workers in their facilities.

While there is no public, verifiable data for the number of camps, there have been various attempts to document suspected camps based on satellite imagery and government documents. On 15 May 2017, Jamestown Foundation, a Washington, DC-based think tank, released a list of 73 government bids related to re-education facilities. On 1 November 2018, the Australian Strategic Policy Institute (ASPI) reported on suspected camps in 28 locations. On 29 November 2018, Reuters and Earthrise Media reported 39 suspected camps. The East Turkistan National Awakening Movement reported an even larger numbers of camps. In November 2019, researcher Adrian Zenz estimated that the number of re-education camps in Xinjiang had surpassed 1,000.

In a 2018 report from US government-funded Radio Free Asia, Awat County (Awati) was said to have three re-education camps. An RFA listener provided a copy of a "confidentiality agreement" requiring re-education camp detainees to not discuss the workings of the camps, and said local residents were instructed to tell members of re-education camp inspection teams visiting No. 2 Re-education Camp that there was only one camp in the county. The RFA listener also said the No. 2 Re-education Camp had transferred thousands of detainees and removed barbed wire from the perimeter of the camp walls.

Satellite analysis by Spain-based GMV showed that internment facilities in Xinjiang underwent significant expansion during 2017 and 2018. Using publicly available satellite imagery, GMV assessed 101 suspected sites linked to the region's re-education camp system, identifying 44 as highly likely to have been security facilities based on features such as perimeter fencing and watchtowers. The analysis revealed a sharp increase in both the number and scale of new constructions beginning in 2017, with a continued trend in 2018 toward larger facilities, despite a slight decline in the number of new projects. Overall, the secure area of the 44 sites expanded by approximately 440 hectares since 2003, reflecting a substantial increase in infrastructure associated with the detention of Uyghurs and other Muslim minorities.

=== Boarding schools for the children of detainees ===
The detention of Uyghurs and other ethnic minorities has allegedly left many children without their parents. The Chinese government has allegedly held these children at a variety of institutions and schools colloquially known as "boarding schools", although not all are residential institutions, that serve as de facto orphanages. In September 2018, the Associated Press reported that thousands of boarding schools were being built. According to the Chinese Ministry of Education children as young as eight are enrolled in these schools.

According to Adrian Zenz and BBC in 2019, children of detained parents in boarding schools were penalized for failing to speak Mandarin Chinese and prevented from exercising their religion. In a paper published in the Journal of Political Risk, Zenz calls the effort a "systematic campaign of social re-engineering and cultural genocide". Human Rights Watch said that the children detained at child welfare facilities and boarding schools were held without parental consent or access. In December 2019, The New York Times reported that approximately 497,000 elementary and junior high school students were enrolled in these boarding schools. They also reported that students are only allowed to see family members once every two weeks and that they were forbidden from speaking the Uyghur language.

=== Locations ===
External image
- Interactive map by Australian Strategic Policy Institute (ASPI)

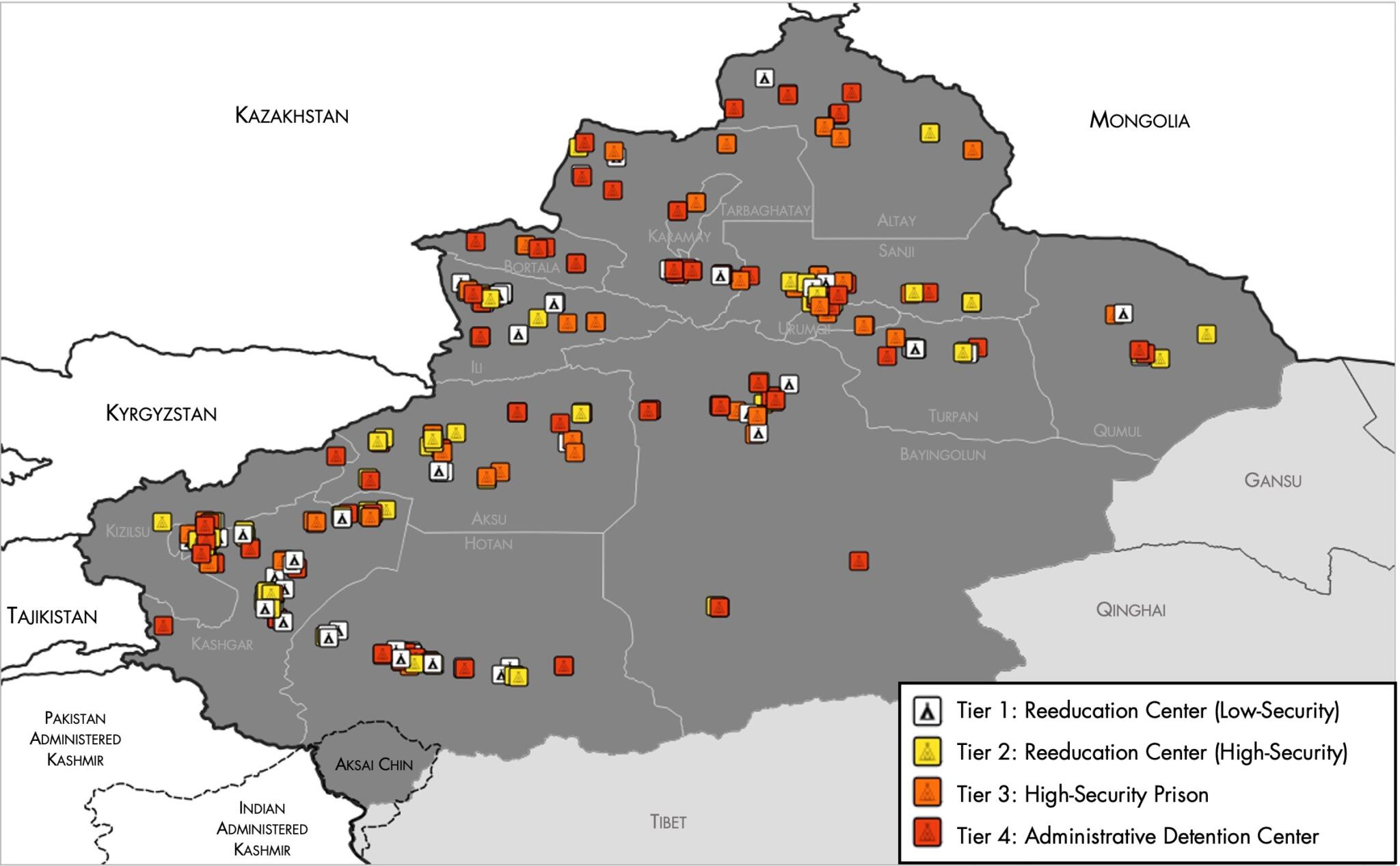
Camp locations identified by the U.S. National Geospatial-Intelligence Agency and ASPI

Numerous locations have been identified as re-education camps. The Australian Strategic Policy Institute, whose funding is primarily from the Australian Government with overseas funding primarily from the US State Department and Department of Defense, had identified more than 380 "suspected detention facilities".

- Camps in Akto County (Aktu, Aketao), Kizilsu Kyrgyz Autonomous Prefecture
- Four detention centers in Aksu City (Akesu), Aksu Prefecture
- Artux City Vocational Skills Education Training Service Center in Artux in Kizilsu Prefecture
- Jiashi County Secondary Vocational School (伽师县中等职业学校) in Payzawat County (Jiashi), Kashgar Prefecture
- Three detention centers in Kalpin County (Kelpin, Keping), Aksu Prefecture
- Eight vocational training centres in Lop County (Luopu), Hotan Prefecture
  - Lop County No. 4 Vocational Skills Education and Training Center

Information reasonably indicates that this "re-education" internment camp, which is often called a Vocational Skills Education and Training Center, is providing prison labor to nearby manufacturing entities in Xinjiang. CBP identified forced labor indicators including highly coercive/unfree recruitment, work and life under duress, and restriction of movement.
(statement of the US Department of Homeland Security)

- Maralbexi County (Bachu County) re-education camp in Kashgar Prefecture
- Eight camps in Turfan Prefecture
  - No. 4 Training Center (on the road between Turpan and Toksun County)
- Three re-education camps in Uqturpan County (Uchturpan, Wushi), Aksu Prefecture
- Yutian county vocational training centre in Yutian County (Keriya), Hotan Prefecture, among the largest of the camps

== Camp detainees ==
The mass internment of Uyghurs and other Turkic Muslims in the camps has become the largest-scale arbitrary detention of ethnic and religious minorities since World War II.

Many media outlets have reported that hundreds of thousands of Uyghurs, as well as Kazakhs, Kyrgyz and other ethnic minorities, have been held in the camps. Radio Free Asia, a news service funded by the US government, estimated in January 2018 that 120,000 members of the Uyghurs were being held in political re-education camps in Kashgar prefecture alone at the time. In 2018, local government authorities in Qira County expected to have almost 12,000 detainees in vocational camps and detention centres and some projects related to the centres outstripped budgetary limits. Reports of Uyghurs living or studying abroad being detained upon return to Xinjiang are common, which is thought to be connected to the re-education camps. Many living abroad have gone for years without being able to contact their family members still in Xinjiang, who may be detainees.

Uyghur political figure Rebiya Kadeer, who has been in exile since 2005, has had as many as 30 relatives detained or disappeared, including her sisters, brothers, children, grandchildren, and siblings, according to Amnesty International. It is unclear when they were taken away. In February 2021, two of Kadeer's granddaughters appeared in a video on Twitter denying abuses and telling her not to be "fooled again by those bad foreigners".

On 13 July 2018, Sayragul Sauytbay, an ethnic Kazakh Chinese national and former employee of the Chinese state, appeared in a court in the city of Zharkent, Kazakhstan for being accused of illegally crossing the border between the two countries. During the trial she talked about her forced work at a re-education camp for 2,500 ethnic Kazakhs. Her lawyer argued that if she is extradited to China, she would face the death penalty for exposing re-education camps in Kazakh court. Her testimony for the re-education camps have become the focus of a court case in Kazakhstan, which was also testing the country's ties with Beijing. On 1 August 2018, Sauytbay was released with a six-month suspended sentence and directed to regularly check-in with police. She applied for asylum in Kazakhstan to avoid deportation to China. Kazakhstan refused her application. On 2 June 2019 she flew to Sweden where she was subsequently granted political asylum.

According to a Radio Free Asia interview with an officer at the Onsu County police station, as of August 2018, 30,000 persons, or about one in six Uyghurs in the county (approximately 16% of the overall population of the county), were detained in re-education camps.

Russian-American Gene Bunin created the Xinjiang Victims Database to collect public testimonies on people detained in the camps, and its content had been referenced in articles by Al Jazeera, RFA, Foreign Policy, the Uyghur Human Rights Project, Amnesty and Human Rights Watch. On 14 January 2023, the database included photos of Hong Kong actors Andy Lau and Chow Yun-fat in a list of police officers responsible for rounding up "thousands of documented victims", which aroused suspicion on Twitter about the database's authenticity.

When the BBC was invited to the camps in June 2019, officials there told them the detainees were "almost criminals" who could choose "between a judicial hearing or education in the de-extremification facilities". The Globe and Mail reported in September 2019 that some Han people and Christian Uyghurs in Xinjiang who had disputes with local authorities or expressed politically unwelcome thoughts had also been sent to the camps.

Victor Shih, a political economist at the University of California, San Diego, said in July 2019 the mass internments were unnecessary because "no active insurgencies" existed, only "isolated terrorist incidents". He suggested that because a great deal of money was spent setting up the camps, the money likely went to associates of the politicians who created them.

Anonymous drone footage posted on YouTube in September 2019 showed kneeling blindfolded inmates that an analyst at the Australian Strategic Policy Institute said may have been an inmate transfer at a train station near Korla and may have been from a re-education camp.

Anar Sabit, an ethnic Kazakh from Kuytun living in Canada who was imprisoned in 2017 after returning home following the death of her father, was detained for having gone abroad. She found other minorities were interned for offenses such as using forbidden technology (WhatsApp, a V.P.N.), travelling abroad, but that even a Uyghur working for the Communist party as a propagandist could be interned for the offense of having been booked in a hotel by an airline with others who were under suspicion.

According to an anonymous Uyghur local government employee quoted in an article by US government-sponsored Radio Free Asia, during Ramadan 2020 (23 April to 23 May), residents of Makit County (Maigaiti), Kashgar Prefecture were told they could face punishment for religious fasting including being sent to a re-education camp.

=== Research and estimates ===
According to a 2019 report by Mercator Institute for China Studies (MERICS), there were two key studies that had independently estimated that around one million people had been detained in Xinjiang.

Adrian Zenz, a senior fellow in China studies at the Victims of Communism Memorial Foundation, has been primarily cited in the early estimates. Zenz's analysis uses accounting figures derived from documents that were reportedly leaked by anonymous Chinese public security officials to Istiqlal, a Turkey-based Uyghur exile media organization. Using Radio Free Asia reports and his own research, Zenz estimated the total internment figures to be "anywhere between several hundred thousand and just over one million" in 2018. Writing in the Journal of Political Risk in July 2019, Zenz estimated an upper speculative limit to the number of people detained in Xinjiang re-education camps at 1.5 million.

Chinese Human Rights Defenders (CHRD), a US-based advocacy organization, later published their estimate of one million detained Uyghurs. Reportedly, they had based their estimate on the interviews with eight ethnic Uyghur individuals who came from eight different villages in southern Xinjiang between mid-2017 and mid-2018.

According to an official report by the Chinese government, 1.3 million people received "vocational training" sessions annually between 2014 and 2019. According to the Chinese ambassador to Australia Cheng Jingye in December 2019, all of the "trainees" in the centers have graduated and have gradually returned to their jobs or found new jobs with government assistance. Cheng also called reports that one million Uyghurs had been detained in Xinjiang "fake news" and that "what has been done in Xinjiang has no ... difference with what the other countries, including western countries, [do] to fight against terrorists."

=== Conditions in the camps ===
The camps, officially known as Vocational Education and Training Centers, were informally called as "schools", and described by some officials as "hospitals" where inmates were treated for the "disease" of "extremist ideology". According to internment officials quoted in Xinjiang Daily, (a Communist Party-run newspaper) while "requirements for our students" are "strict ... we have a gentle attitude, and put our hearts into treating them". Being in one "is actually like staying at a boarding school." The newspaper quoted a former inmate as stating during his internment he had realized he had been "increasingly drifting away from 'home,'" under the influence of extremism. "With the government's help and education, I've returned. ... "our lives are improving every day. No matter who you are, first and foremost you are a Chinese citizen.'"

Waterboarding, mass rape, and sexual abuse were reported to be among the forms of torture used as part of the indoctrination process at the camps.

Kayrat Samarkand, a Kazakh citizen who migrated from Xinjiang, was detained in one of the re-education camps in the region for three months for visiting neighboring Kazakhstan. On 15 February 2018, Kazakh Foreign Minister Kairat Abdrakhmanov sent a diplomatic note to the Chinese Foreign Ministry, the same day as Kayrat Samarkand was freed from custody. After his release, Samarkand said that he faced endless brainwashing and humiliation, and that he was forced to study communist propaganda for hours every day and chant slogans giving thanks and wishing for a long life to Xi Jinping.

Mihrigul Tursun, a Uyghur woman detained in China, after escaping one of these camps, talked of beatings and torture. After moving to Egypt, she traveled to China in 2015 to spend time with her family and was immediately detained and separated from her infant children. When Tursun was released three months later, one of the triplets had died and the other two had developed health problems. Tursun said the children had been operated on. She was arrested for the second time about two years later. Several months later, she was detained the third time and spent three months in a cramped prison cell with 60 other women, having to sleep in turns, use the toilet in front of security cameras and sing songs praising the Chinese Communist Party.

Tursun said she and other inmates were forced to take unknown medication, including pills that made them faint and a white liquid that caused bleeding in some women and loss of menstruation in others. Tursun said nine women from her cell died during her three months there. One day, Tursun recalled, she was led into a room and placed in a high chair, and her legs and arms were locked in place. "The authorities put a helmet-like thing on my head, and each time I was electrocuted, my whole body would shake violently and I would feel the pain in my veins," Tursun said in a statement read by a translator. "I don't remember the rest. White foam came out of my mouth, and I began to lose consciousness," Tursun said. "The last word I heard them saying is that you being an Uyghur is a crime." She was eventually released so that she could take her children to Egypt, but she was ordered to return to China. Once in Cairo, Tursun contacted U.S. authorities and, in September, went to the United States and settled in Virginia. China's Foreign Ministry Spokesperson Hua Chunying has stated that Tursun was taken into custody by police on "suspicion of inciting ethnic hatred and discrimination" for a period lasting 20 days, but denies that Tursun was detained in a re-education camp.

Former inmates say that they were required to learn to sing the national anthem of China and communist songs. Punishments, like being placed in handcuffs for hours, waterboarding, or being strapped to "tiger chair" (a metal contraption) for long periods of time, were allegedly used on those who fail to follow.

Anar Sabit, a cooperative inmate who had a relatively minor offense of foreign travel, described her confinement in the women's section as prison-like and marked by bureaucratic rigidity but said that she was not beaten or tortured . Before and after her internment, Sabit said that she experienced what Chinese sometimes call gui da qiang, or 'ghost walls' "that confuse and entrap travelers". After her release from internment, she said that she remains a "focus person" in her hometown of Kuytun where she lives with her uncle's family. She described the town as resembling an "open air prison" due to the careful monitoring by cameras, sensors, police, and the neighborhood residential committee, and that she feels shunned by almost all friends and family and worries that she will endanger anyone who helps her. After Sabit moved out of her uncle's house, Sabit lived in the dormitory of the neighborhood residential committee who she said threatened to return her to the re-education camp for speaking out of turn.

According to detainees, they were also forced to drink alcohol and eat pork, which are forbidden in Islam. Some reportedly received unknown medicines while others attempted suicide. There have also been deaths reported due to unspecified causes. Detainees have alleged widespread sexual abuse, including forced abortions, forced use of contraceptive devices and compulsory sterilization. It has been reported that Han officials have been assigned to reside in the homes of Uyghurs who have been in the camps. Rushan Abbas of the Campaign for Uyghurs argues that the actions of the Chinese government amount to genocide according to United Nations definitions which are laid out in the Genocide Convention.

According to Time, Sarsenbek Akaruli, 45, a veterinarian and trader from Ili, Xinjiang, was arrested in Xinjiang on 2 November 2017. As of November 2019, he is still in a detention camp. According to his wife Gulnur Kosdaulet, Akaruli was put in the camp after police found the banned messaging app WhatsApp on his cell phone. Kosdaulet, a citizen of neighboring Kazakhstan, has traveled to Xinjiang on four occasions to search for her husband but could not get help from friends in the Chinese Communist Party. Kosdaulet said of her friends, "Nobody wanted to risk being recorded on security cameras talking to me in case they ended up in the camps themselves."

In May to June 2017, a woman native to Maralbexi County (Bachu) named Mailikemu Maimati (also spelled Mamiti) was detained in the county's re-education camp according to her husband Mirza Imran Baig. He said that after her release, she and their young son were not given their passports by Chinese authorities.

In July 2017, Gulzira Auelkhan, a 42-year-old woman who returned from Kazakhstan to Xinjiang to care for her ailing father, was detained upon arrival without any stated reason. For over 15 months, she was "ferried" across five different prison camps and interrogated at least 19 times. Tortured by electric batons, she was forced to learn mandarin and subsequently sent to a labor camp where she was overworked for over two months, underpaid for her labor, and then given an injection which was described as a "flu shot" which impacted her period cycles and made her lethargic.

According to Time, former prisoner Bakitali Nur, 47, native of Khorgos, Xinjiang on the Sino-Kazakh border, was arrested because authorities were suspicious of his frequent trips abroad. He reported spending a year in a cell with seven other prisoners. The prisoners sat on stools seventeen hours a day, were not allowed to talk or move and were under constant surveillance. Movement carried the punishment of being put into stress positions for hours. After release, he was forced to make daily self-criticisms, report on his plans and work for negligible payment in government factories. In May 2019, he escaped to Kazakhstan. Nur summarized his experience in jail and under constant monitoring after his release saying, "The entire system is designed to suppress us."

According to Radio Free Asia, Ghalipjan, a 35 year old Uyghur man from Shanshan/Pichan County who was married and had a five-year-old son, died in a re-education camp on 21 August 2018. Authorities reported his death was due to heart attack, but the head of the Ayagh neighborhood committee said that he was beaten to death by a police officer. His family was not allowed to carry out Islamic funeral rites.

According to the Xinjiang Police Files, Chen Quanguo issued a shooting order for detainees attempting to escape in 2018.

In June 2018, President of the World Uyghur Congress (WUC) Dolkun Isa was told that his mother Ayhan Memet, 78, had died two months earlier while in detention at a "political re-education camp". The WUC president was unsure if she had been incarcerated in one of the many "political re-education camps".

According to a 2018 report in The New York Times, Abdusalam Muhemet, 41, who ran a restaurant in Hotan before fleeing China in 2018, said he spent seven months in prison and more than two months in a camp in Hotan in 2015 without ever being criminally charged. Muhemet said that on most days, the inmates at the camp would assemble to hear long lectures by officials who warned them not to embrace Islamic radicalism, support Uyghur independence or defy the Communist Party.

In an interview with Radio Free Asia, an officer at the Kuqa (Kuchar, Kuche) County Police Department reported that from June to December 2018, 150 people at the No. 1 Internment Camp in the Yengisher district of Kuqa county had died, corroborating earlier reports attributed to Himit Qari, former area police chief.

In August 2020, the BBC released texts and a video smuggled out of a re-education camp by Merdan Ghappar, a former model of Uyghur heritage. Mergan had been allowed access to personal effects, and used a phone to take videos of the camp he is interned in.

In a January 2021 article co-authored for The Guardian, Gulbahar Haitiwaji, a Uyghur woman living in exile in France, described her experience of detention in a Chinese "re-education" camp in Xinjiang. After returning to China in 2016 under the pretext of signing retirement papers, she was arrested and later held for two years in a facility in Baijiantan, Karamay. Her testimony details the systematic dehumanization, indoctrination, and physical abuse she endured, including forced confessions, mass surveillance, military-style drills, and ideological reprogramming. Haitiwaji recounts being subjected to relentless brainwashing, denial of religious and cultural identity, and suspected forced sterilization. She asserts that the camps aim not just to punish but to erase Uyghur identity. Though eventually declared innocent and released in 2019, she described herself and fellow survivors as “shadows” whose souls were "dead" from the psychological trauma endured. While under detention, Gulbahar was forced to make false confessions. During one of her interrogations, an officer described her daughter, Gulhumar, as a "terrorist" because she had posed in front of the Place du Trocadéro in Paris with an East Turkistan flag. According to her, there were almost 200 women detained at the Baijiantan camp.

In February 2021, the BBC issued further eyewitness accounts of mass rape and torture in the camps. Sayragul Sauytbay told the BBC as a teacher forced to work in the camps that "rape was common" and the guards "picked the girls and young women they wanted and took them away". She also described a woman who was brought to make a forced confession in front of 100 other detainees while the police took turns to rape her as she cried out for help. In 2018, a Globe and Mail interview with Sauytbay found that she did not personally see violence at the camp, but did witness hunger and a complete lack of freedom. Tursunay Ziawudun, a Uyghur who fled to Kazakhstan and then the US, told the BBC that she was raped three times in the camps and kicked in the abdomen during interrogations. In a 2020 interview with BuzzFeed News, Ziawudun reported that she "wasn't beaten or abused" while inside, but was instead subjected to long interrogations, forced to watch propaganda, kept in cold conditions with poor food, and had her hair cut.

=== Forced labor ===
Adrian Zenz reported that the re-education camps also function as forced labor camps in which Uyghurs and Kazakhs produce various products for export, especially those made from cotton grown in Xinjiang. The growing of cotton is central to the industry of the region as "43 percent of Xinjiang's exports are apparel, footwear, or textiles". In 2018, 84% of China's cotton was produced in the Xinjiang province. Since cotton is grown and processed into textiles in Xinjiang, a November 2019 article from The Diplomat said that "the risk of forced labor exists at multiple steps in the creation of a product".

Academics Zhun Xu and Fangfei Lin write that the conclusion of forced labor in cotton production in Xinjiang is insufficiently supported. They cite the historic significance of Uyghur agricultural workers as a long-standing labor force for manual cotton harvesting and staffing companies' widespread recruitment of Uyghur workers due to lower travel costs. In their view, "[T]he labor demand of Uyghur seasonal cotton pickers in south Xinjiang is largely decided by its relatively low degree of agricultural capitalization, not due to the 'special treatment' towards labor migrants of a certain ethnic minority."

The Australian Strategic Policy Institute reported that from 2017 to 2019 more than 80,000 Uyghurs were shipped elsewhere in China for factory jobs that "strongly suggest forced labour". Conditions of these factories were consistent with the stipulations of forced labor as defined by the International Labour Organization. In a May 2025 report, the Bureau of Investigative Journalism (TBIJ) documented the transfer of at least 11,000 individuals from Xinjiang to factories across nine Chinese provinces, including the cities of Tianjin and Chongqing, over the past decade. Official figures suggest the actual number is significantly higher, with Jiangsu province alone reporting 39,000 Xinjiang migrant workers in 2023, and one county transferring over 10,000 people in the first quarter of that year. According to state media, more than 100,000 such transfers have occurred since the program began in 2006.

In 2018, the Financial Times reported that the Yutian / Keriya county vocational training centre, among the largest of the Xinjiang re-education camps, had opened a forced labour facility including eight factories spanning shoemaking, mobile phone assembly and tea packaging, giving a base monthly salary of CN¥1,500. Between 2016 and 2018, the centre expanded 269 percent in total area.

In 2021, former supplier for Nike, Esquel Group, sued the United States Government for listing it on a sanction list for forced labor allegations in Xinjiang. It was later removed from the sanction list due to lack of evidence provided by the US Commerce department.

In October 2021, the CBC in collaboration with the Investigative Reporting Project Italy along with The Guardian reported on the export of tomato products from Xinjiang and tied to forced labor by the Uyghurs. The report identified tomato products being exported to other countries such as Italy to be repackaged for sale in other markets such as Canada.

In June 2021, human rights reports indicated that costs of solar modules had been depressed in recent years due to Chinese forced labor practices in the solar module and wind turbine exports industry. Globally, China dominated manufacturing, installation and exports in the field. The practice of forced labor was blamed for the bankruptcy of firms in the US and German solar industries, multiple times, over the decade 2010–2020. In one report, upon declaring a bankruptcy, the cost of raw materials for manufacturing panels was suggested to be 30% of the total manufacturing costs. It was argued that China do not pay labor costs.

A June 2025 report by Global Rights Compliance said that 15 companies involved in the extraction and processing of critical minerals directly used state-imposed forced labor in Xinjiang and that there were an additional 68 downstream customers. The report warned that significant portions of the world economy may be exposed to products involving forced labor practices. Radio Free Asia stated that the report was based on "analyses of state media, shipping records, and marketing and corporate annual reports.

=== Notable detainees ===
- Ablajan Awut Ayup, rapper
- Merdan Ghappar, model
- Adil Mijit, comedian, suspected detainee
- Mihrigul Tursun (former detainee)

== Responses from China ==
- Prior to October 2018, when international media had asked about the re-education camps, China's Ministry of Foreign Affairs said that they have not heard of this situation. After initially denying the existence of the camps the Chinese government has maintained that its actions in Xinjiang are justifiable responses to the threats of extremism and terrorism.
- On 12 August 2018, a Chinese state-run tabloid, Global Times, defended the crackdown in Xinjiang after a U.N. anti-discrimination committee raised concerns over China's treatment of Uyghurs. According to the Global Times, China prevented Xinjiang from becoming 'China's Syria' or 'China's Libya', and local authorities' policies saved countless lives and avoided a 'great tragedy'.
- On 13 August 2018, at a UN meeting in Geneva, the delegation from China told the United Nations Human Rights Committee that "There is no such thing as re-education centers in Xinjiang and it is completely untrue that China put 1 million Uyghurs into re-education camps". A Chinese delegation said that "Xinjiang citizens, including the Uyghurs, enjoy equal freedom and rights." They said that "Some minor offenders of religious extremism or separatism have been taken to 'vocational education' and employment training centers with a view to assisting in their rehabilitation".
- On 14 August 2018, Chinese Foreign Ministry spokesman Lu Kang said "anti-China forces had made false accusations against China for political purposes and a few foreign media outlets misrepresented the committee's discussions and were smearing China's anti-terror and crime-fighting measures in Xinjiang" after a UN human rights committee raised concern over reported mass detentions of ethnic Uyghurs.
- On 21 August 2018, Liu Xiaoming, the Ambassador of China to the United Kingdom, wrote an article in response to a Financial Times report entitled "Crackdown in Xinjiang: Where have all the people gone?". Liu's response said: "The education and training measures taken by the local government of Xinjiang have not only effectively prevented the infiltration of religious extremism and helped those lost in extremist ideas to find their way back, but also provided them with employment training in order to build a better life."
- On 10 September 2018, China's Foreign Ministry spokesperson Geng Shuang condemned a report about the re-education camps issued by Human Rights Watch. He said: "This organisation has always been full of prejudice and distorting facts about China." Geng also added that: "Xinjiang is enjoying overall social stability, sound economic development and harmonious co-existence of different ethnic groups. The series of measures implemented in Xinjiang are meant to improve stability, development, solidarity and people's livelihood, crack down on ethnic separatist activities and violent and terrorist crimes, safeguard national security, and protect people's life and property."
- On 11 September 2018, China called for UN human rights chief Michelle Bachelet to "respect its sovereignty", after she urged China to allow monitors into Xinjiang and expressed concern about the situation there. Chinese Foreign Ministry spokesman Geng Shuang said: "China urges the U.N. human rights high commissioner and office to scrupulously abide by the mission and principles of the U.N. charter, respect China's sovereignty, fairly and objectively carry out its duties, and not listen to one-sided information".
- On 16 October 2018, a CCTV prime-time program aired a 15-minute episode on what was termed as Xinjiang's 'Vocational Skills Educational Training Centers', featuring the Muslim internees. Sinologist Manya Koetse documented that it received a mixture of supportive and critical responses on the Sina Weibo social media platform.
- In March 2019, against the background of the US considering imposing sanctions against Chen Quanguo, the CCP committee secretary of Xinjiang and most powerful regional figure, Xinjiang governor Shohrat Zakir denied international claims of concentration camps and re-education camps, instead comparing the institutions to boarding schools.
- On 18 March 2019, the Chinese government released a white paper about counter-terrorism and de-radicalization in Xinjiang. The white paper states, "A country under the rule of law, China respects and protects human rights in accordance with the principles of its Constitution." The white paper also contends that Xinjiang has not had violent terrorist cases for more than two consecutive years, extremist penetration has been effectively curbed, and social security has improved significantly.
- In November 2019, the Chinese ambassador to the United Kingdom responded to questions about newly leaked documents on Xinjiang by calling the documents "fake news".
- On 6 December 2019, China's Foreign Ministry spokesperson Hua Chunying accused the US of hypocrisy on human rights issues relating to allegations of torture at Guantanamo Bay detention camp.
- In September 2020, Xi Jinping acclaimed the success of his policies in Xinjiang in a 2-day conference expected to set the country's policy for the next years. The Chinese government published a white paper defending what it termed its "vocational training centers" and stating that the regional government organised 'employment-oriented training' and labor skills for 1.29 million workers a year from 2014 to 2019.
- On 7 January 2021, the US Chinese embassy published a tweet that said: "The minds of (Uighur) women in Xinjiang were emancipated and gender equality and reproductive health were promoted, making them no longer baby-making machines," which drew sharp criticism from human rights groups as well as Sam Brownback, the US envoy on international religious freedom. Subsequently, the tweet was deleted and Twitter locked the embassy's account.
- In March 2021, following sanctions imposed on several Chinese officials by the European Union, the United States, the United Kingdom and Canada, the Chinese government responded with sanctions on several individuals and groups that had criticized China over the camps, including five European Parliament members (among them Reinhard Butikofer, the head of the European Parliament's delegation to China), German scholar Adrian Zenz, and the non-profit Alliance of Democracies Foundation.
- In June 2021, ProPublica and The New York Times documented a Chinese government-backed propaganda campaign on Twitter and YouTube involving more than 5000 videos analysed. They showed Uyghurs in Xinjiang denying abuses and scolding foreign officials and multinational corporations who had questioned China's human rights record in the province. Some of the videos' accounts were removed on YouTube as part of the company's efforts to combat spam and influence operations.
- In October 2022, the Australian Strategic Policy Institute documented a number of CCP-backed Uyghur influencers in Xinjiang posting propaganda videos on Chinese and Western social media which pushed back against abuse allegations. Some of the influencers' accounts were suspended on Twitter for alleged inauthenticity.

== International reactions ==
In 2019, at the United Nations, 54 countries, including China itself, rejected the allegations and supported the Chinese government's policies in Xinjiang. In another letter, 23 countries shared the concerns in the committee's reports and called on China to uphold human rights. In September 2020, the Australian Strategic Policy Institute (ASPI) reported in its Xinjiang Data Project that construction of camps continued despite government claims that their function was winding down. In October 2020, it was reported that the total number of countries that denounced China increased to 39, while the total number of countries that defended China decreased to 45. Sixteen countries that defended China in 2019 did not do so in 2020. Thirty-seven countries have expressed support for China's government for "counter-terrorism and de-radicalization measures", including countries such as Russia, Saudi Arabia, Cuba, and Venezuela; meanwhile 22 or 43 countries, depending on sources, have called on China to respect the human rights of the Uyghur community, including countries such as Canada, Germany and Japan.

In January 2021, the United States Department of State declared China's actions as genocide, and legislatures in several countries have passed non-binding motions doing the same, including the House of Commons of Canada, the Dutch parliament, the House of Commons of the United Kingdom, the Seimas of Lithuania, and the French National Assembly. Other parliaments, such as those in New Zealand, Belgium, and the Czech Republic condemned the Chinese government's treatment of Uyghurs as "severe human rights abuses" or crimes against humanity.

== See also ==
- Dzungar genocide
- East Turkestan independence movement
- Enhanced interrogation techniques
- Ethnocide
- Freedom of religion
- Freedom of religion in China
- Genocide of indigenous peoples
- Human rights in China
- Turkic settlement of the Tarim Basin
- John Sudworth, a BBC reporter who covered the camps
- Laogai – known as "reform through labor" in English
- Mass surveillance in China
- Overseas censorship of Chinese issues
- Pan-Turkism
- Persecution of Muslims
- Protest and dissent in China
- Qincheng Prison, Beijing
- Racism in China
- Re-education through labor
- Religion in China
- Religious persecution
- Secession in China
- Sinicization of Tibet
- Terrorism in China
- Three Evils
- Transnational repression by China
- Two-faced person
- Zhu Hailun
