= Tursunay Ziyawudun =

Former detainee in Xinjiang re-education camps

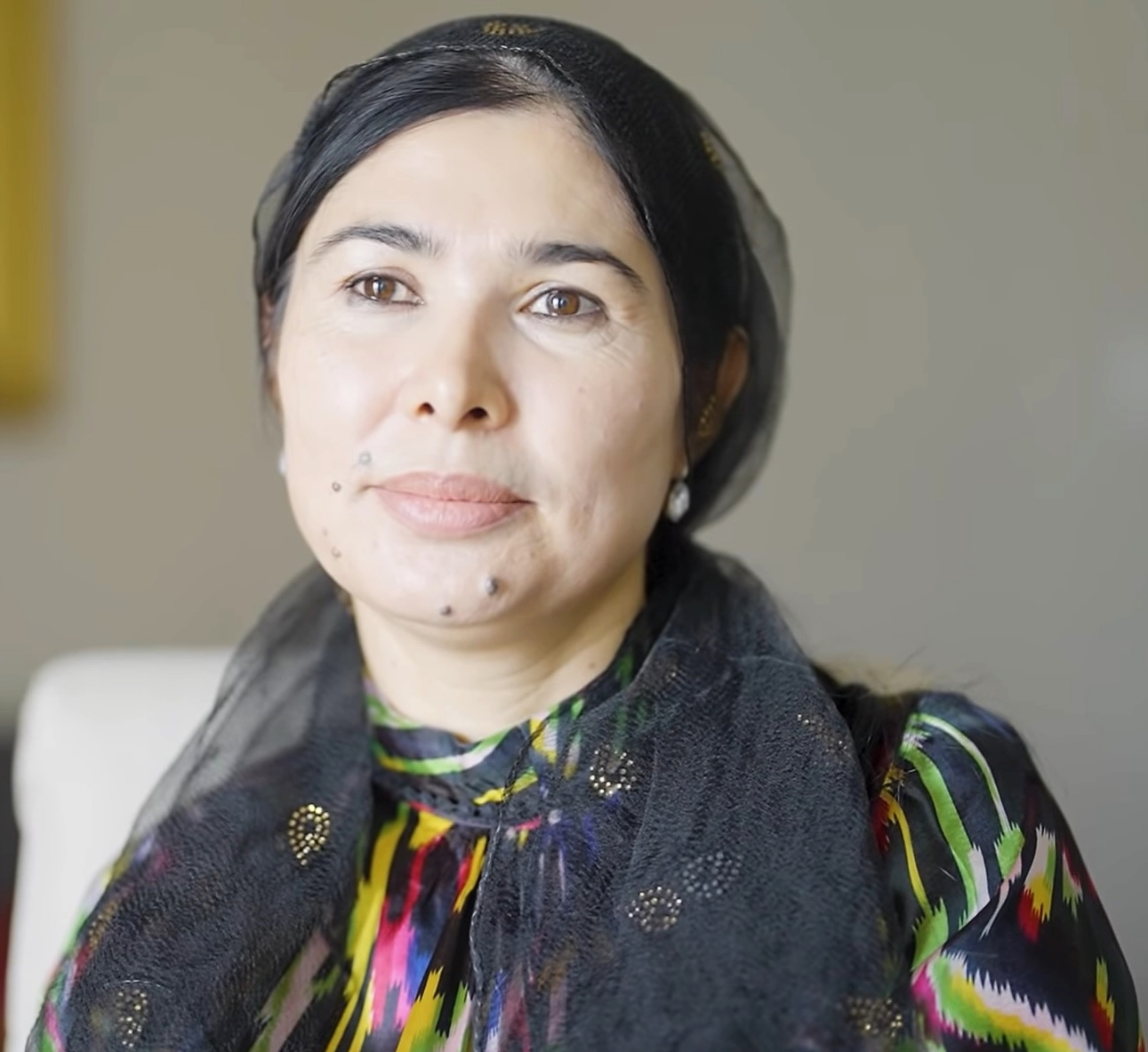
- Ziyawudun on Reason (magazine) TV in 2021
- Born: 10 August 1978 (age 48); Kunes, Xinjiang, China
- Known for: Former detainee in Xinjiang re-education camps

Tursunay Ziyawudun (Uyghur: تۇرسۇنئاي زىياۋۇدۇن; born 10 August 1978), born in Kunes of Xinjiang, is a former Uyghur detainee in one of the re-education camps in Xinjiang, China.

== Testimony ==
Ziyawudun claims that she was taken to one of the re-education camps in April 2017 and was released after a month, at which time she had developed stomach ulcers, but she was detained in March 2018 for the second time. She was released from the camp in December 2018 and was allowed to go to Kazakhstan to unite with her husband in September 2019. She then gave interviews to the press describing the emotional trauma of the re-education camp, even while fearing Chinese retaliation. She also told the Associated Press that she was physically abused during interrogation, kicked in the stomach repeatedly and forcibly sterilized. She said that she is now unable to have children.

== See also ==
- Uyghur Americans
- Xinjiang re-education camps
- Uyghur Human Rights Policy Act
- Magnitsky Act
- United States sanctions against China
