= Victor Shih =

American political scientist

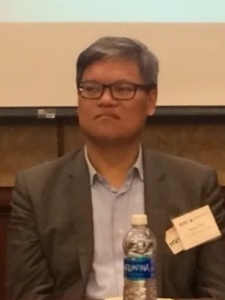
- Shih at a UCSD panel on October 23, 2017
- Citizenship: American
- Education: George Washington University (BA); Harvard University (PhD)
- Occupation: Political scientist
- Employer: University of California, San Diego
- Organization: Center for Strategic and International Studies

Victor Shih (Chinese: 史宗瀚) is an American political scientist. He is the Ho Miu Lam Chair in China and Pacific Relations at the University of California, San Diego (UCSD). He is also a non-resident senior associate with the Center for Strategic and International Studies's Freeman Chair in China Studies.

== Early life and education ==
Shih was born in Hong Kong. He moved to the United States at the age of 12.

Shih holds a BA in East Asian studies from George Washington University (1997) and a PhD in government from Harvard University (2003).

== Career ==
Shih joined UCSD after serving as a principal at Carlyle Group and a professor of political science at Northwestern University. He was appointed director of UCSD's 21st Century China Center in July 2023.

Shih is an associate editor of the Journal of East Asian Studies and serves on the editorial board of China Quarterly.

== Publications ==
=== Books ===
- Coalitions of the Weak: Elite Politics in China from Mao’s Stratagem to the Rise of Xi, Cambridge University Press, May 2022
- Factions and Finance in China: Elite Conflict and Inflation, Cambridge University Press, September 2012

=== Articles ===
- Can one statement fundamentally calm market volatility in China? Atlantic Council, March 24, 2022
- How the Chinese Government Created the Asset Bubble, New York Times, April 15, 2011
- Moral Hazard and China's Banks, Wall Street Journal, June 21, 2010
