= Adrian Zenz =

German anthropologist (born 1974)

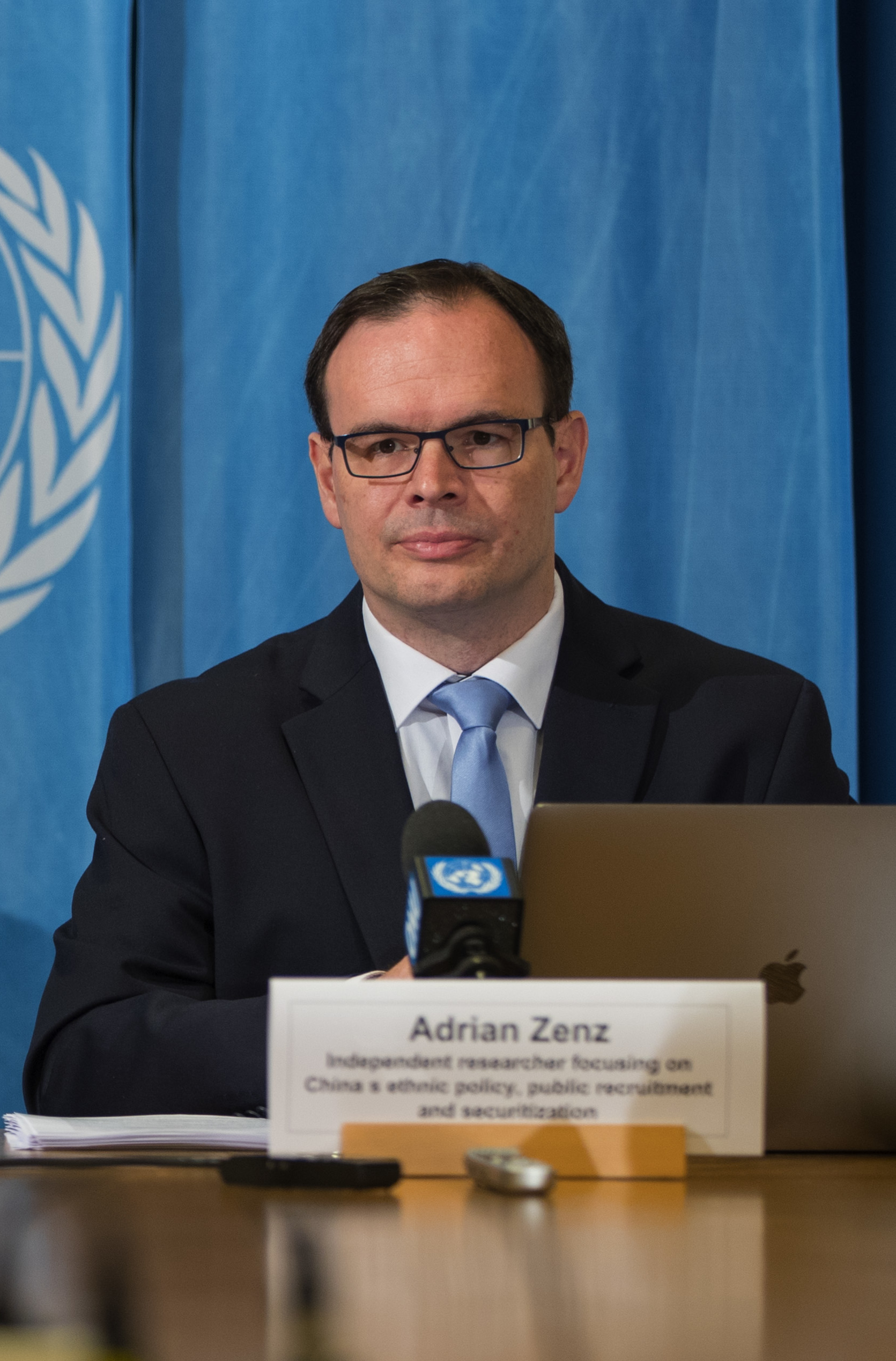
- Zenz in 2019
- Born: Adrian Nikolaus Zenz; 1974 (age 51–52)
- Citizenship: German
- Known for: Research on Xinjiang re-education camps

Academic background
- Education: University of Auckland (MA); University of Cambridge (PhD)
- Thesis: 'Tibetanness' Under Threat?: Assimilation, Career and Market Reforms in Qinghai, P.R. China (2010)
- Doctoral advisor: Hildegard Diemberger

Academic work
- Discipline: Anthropology
- Institutions: Victims of Communism Memorial Foundation; European School of Culture and Theology (Akademie für Weltmission and Columbia International University)

Adrian Nikolaus Zenz (born 1974) is a German anthropologist known for his studies of the Xinjiang re-education camps and persecution of Uyghurs in China. He is a director and senior fellow in China studies at the Victims of Communism Memorial Foundation.

== Career ==
Zenz received a master's degree in development studies from the University of Auckland in 2001, after which he managed development projects in China. He later earned a PhD in social anthropology from the University of Cambridge, with a doctoral thesis on minority education, job opportunities, and the ethnic identity of young Tibetans in western China. He is fluent in Mandarin Chinese.

He was a lecturer in social research methodology at the European School of Culture and Theology, a joint venture between the Evangelical theological institution Akademie für Weltmission and Columbia International University, where he advised doctoral students. In 2018, he moved to the United States. As of 2021, he was a senior fellow in China studies at the Victims of Communism Memorial Foundation, and he served as an advisor to the Inter-Parliamentary Alliance on China.

== Anthropology ==
=== Xinjiang ===
Zenz's most influential work has been his research on the mass detention of Uyghurs and other Turkic Muslim minorities within China's Xinjiang re-education camps. He was one of the first researchers to reveal the existence, size, and scope of these camps.

Zenz's work on the detention of Uyghurs in Xinjiang began in February 2018 and has been based on Chinese government budget plans, bidding papers, leaked documents, spreadsheets, and other official documents. In a May 2018 report published by the Washington, D.C.–based Jamestown Foundation, Zenz initially estimated the number of detained Muslims to range from 100,000 to just over 1 million. He based this estimate on documents published by Istiqlal, a Turkey-based Uyghur exile media organization, which had reportedly been leaked by anonymous Chinese public security officials in the region, along with two reports on Muslim detention quotas by Shohret Hoshur for Radio Free Asia. He then extrapolated from these figures and incorporated information from former detainees and public Chinese government documents that gave indications of the sizes and numbers of the camps.

Since then, his estimate has been cited widely, with many sources, including experts on a United Nations human rights panel, preferring to use the higher end of the estimate's range, while other scholars have questioned its accuracy. In March 2019, Zenz provided an estimate to the United Nations that 1.5 million Uyghurs had been detained in camps, saying that his number accounted for both the increases in the size and scope of detention in the region as well as in public reporting on the stories of Uyghur exiles with relatives in re-education camps. In July 2019, Zenz wrote in the Journal of Political Risk that he speculated that 1.5 million Uyghurs had been extrajudicially detained, which he described as being "an equivalent to just under one in six adult members of a Turkic and predominantly Muslim minority group in Xinjiang".

In November 2019, Zenz estimated that the number of re-education camps in Xinjiang had surpassed 1,000. In July 2020, he wrote in Foreign Policy that his estimate had increased since November 2019, stating that a total of 1.8 million Uyghurs and other Muslim minorities had been extrajudicially detained in what he described as "the largest incarceration of an ethnoreligious minority since the Holocaust" and arguing that the Chinese government was engaging in policies that violated the United Nations Convention on the Prevention and Punishment of the Crime of Genocide.

Zenz has also researched publicly available Chinese government documents that showed that the Chinese government has spent tens of millions of dollars since 2016 on a birth control surgery program that includes cash incentives for sterilization procedures. His research has shown that birth control violations are punishable by imprisonment in the Xinjiang camps, a conclusion that has been corroborated by an AP investigation, which also found that women in Xinjiang were forcibly sterilized and subjected to forced abortions. According to Zenz, population growth rates in the two largest Uyghur prefectures in Xinjiang, Kashgar and Hotan, fell by 84% between 2015 and 2018, due to forced sterilization, contraception, and abortions.

In June 2021, Zenz published a 28-page study in Central Asian Survey, arguing that China has carried out population control in Xinjiang with the explicit "long-term" intent to reduce population growth of the Uyghur ethnic minority.

Zenz published the Xinjiang Police Files, a collection of official police documents he received from anonymous hackers in May 2022. The files include instructions on operating the camps, speeches, and thousands of mug shots taken in 2018.

=== Tibet ===
Zenz is the author of 'Tibetanness' Under Threat?, a 2013 study of the modern Tibetan education system. In the book, he examines the career prospects of students who major in Tibetan-language studies and explores the notion that the greater market value of Chinese-language education threatens Tibetan ethnocultural survival.

In September 2020, Zenz authored a report that said that 500,000 Tibetans, mostly subsistence farmers and herders, were trained in the first seven months of 2020 in military-style training centers. According to BBC News, experts have said these centers "are akin to labour camps".

== Reception ==
Zenz has been the target of a pro-Beijing disinformation campaign, according to U.S.-based cybersecurity firm Mandiant. A fabricated letter was spread through fake news sites, alleging that Zenz received direct funding from US government entities.

=== Xinjiang ===
Zenz's work to expose human rights abuses in Xinjiang has been the subject of widespread international attention and has frequently been cited in media reports.

An analysis published by the Mercator Institute for China Studies in January 2019 said that estimates by Zenz and others that one million Uyghurs had been subject to extrajudicial detention were "credible but remain unavoidably imprecise" and cited Zenz's 2018 study as one of two important studies that "popularized" this number. His work has been described by Frankfurter Allgemeine Zeitung as delivering solid evidence for the extent of the repression that had only been previously known through anecdotal evidence.

As a result of his work on Xinjiang, Zenz has become a target for coordinated disinformation attacks from pro-Beijing and Chinese state-run media as well as other state-affiliated entities. Zenz and his work on Xinjiang have been criticized by the Chinese government, which, according to The Globe and Mail, "has called his findings 'lies'—even when it confirmed them". In March 2021, Chinese state media reported that Chinese companies had filed a lawsuit in Xinjiang against Zenz to recoup economic losses and restore their reputations in response to what Chinese Foreign Ministry spokesman Zhao Lijian described as "Zenz's 'rumors' of forced labor in the region". The lawsuit is one in a series of steps that the Chinese government has taken in order to attack critics of its policies in Xinjiang. On 2 April 2021, a court in Kashgar accepted the civil case brought by a textile company in Xinjiang against Zenz for defamation. During an interview with The Daily Telegraph, published in May 2021, Zenz defended himself against allegations of fabrication, noting that 95% of documents he had analyzed were publicly available government records. He has become the target of repeated cyber attacks, receiving many attempted hacking attacks via email from people posing as Uyghurs. In December 2023, the Financial Times reported that an agent of the Zhejiang branch of the Ministry of State Security had been tasked with discrediting Zenz.

The European Union, United States, United Kingdom, and Canada imposed coordinated sanctions against Chinese government officials over human rights abuses in Xinjiang in March 2021. The US banned imports of cotton from Xinjiang shortly after Zenz published a report describing widespread use of forced labor in the region. The Chinese government responded by imposing retaliatory sanctions against Zenz and others who had criticized it for its human rights abuses in Xinjiang, including nine other people (five of whom are members of the European Parliament), two European Union bodies, the Mercator Institute for China Studies, and the Alliance of Democracies Foundation. The sanctions against Zenz prohibit him from entering the China and restrict his ability to do business with Chinese firms.

=== Tibet ===
A 2019 article in Frankfurter Allgemeine Zeitung described Zenz's research methods on Tibetans as unconventional and exciting little interest in the professional world. It stated that Zenz had analyzed job postings for security personnel in Tibet, compared them with data on self-immolation by Tibetans, and then used that data to draw his conclusions about the Chinese government's policies of repression. Development studies researcher Andrew Fischer described Zenz's early work as an "excellent discussion" of Tibetan education that included "interesting ways of measuring and representing" school outcomes and as offering a "rare insight" into Tibetan education with "fascinating" details and of "immense value".

In 2020, a report from Reuters wrote that the news agency had "corroborated Zenz's findings and found additional policy documents, company reports, procurement filings and state media reports" regarding a growing mass labor program in Tibet. The Chinese Foreign Ministry said in response that work was voluntary and strongly denied the involvement of forced labor.

Robert Barnett, the former director of the Modern Tibetan Studies Program at Columbia University, wrote in March 2021 that Zenz's work on Tibet is generally "well-regarded" and noted that Zenz had been subject to unfair and abusive attacks from Chinese state media. Barnett, however, criticized the methods used in creating a report written by Zenz and published in September 2020 by the Jamestown Foundation, writing that it had not been peer-reviewed prior to publication, did not refer to the findings of other Tibet researchers, and had not been independently verified by field research. He also criticized the timing of and media coverage surrounding the report's publication, arguing that it had been "coordinated with a prominent media campaign" and that notable newspapers had misrepresented the report by overstating Zenz's conclusions regarding the existence of labor camps in Tibet.

== Criticism ==
In a guest commentary in Der Tagesspiegel on 19 February 2020, Mechthild Leutner, emeritus sinologist at the Free University of Berlin and former director of the state-run Chinese Confucius Institute in Berlin, criticized the fact that personalities such as Zenz, who are associated with "fringe evangelical educational institutions", are frequently quoted in the media instead of actual sinologists. According to Leutner, this leads to a lack of differentiated analyses of China in the media. In her statement to the committee, the script of which she did not release for publication, Leutner, who was invited by the left-wing political party Die Linke as an expert to the 66th session of the Committee on Human Rights and Humanitarian Aid in the Bundestag in November 2011, classified the re-education camps in Xinjiang as part of the "preventive measures against extremism", along with programmes "to combat poverty", "for professional qualification", and "to create jobs". These measures supposedly also included the establishment of "centres" for people who were demonstrably involved in "terrorist", "separatist", or "religious" activities. Leutner used the Chinese state term "vocational training centres" for some of the re-education camps and described them in her own words as "deradicalisation centres", which were "created in 2017 and 2018" and "dissolved again in 2019".

In an article published in Die Tageszeitung on 23 September 2020, China correspondent Fabian Kretschmer described Zenz as "controversial", since the Chinese state media accused him of having a "radical evangelical background", and he criticized Zenz for not having visited China in over ten years. According to Kretschmer, the fact that Zenz works for the right-wing conservative think tank Victims of Communism Memorial Foundation, which has "close ties to the CIA", also casts him in a "dubious light". He has, however, stated that Zenz's research is primarily based on publicly available documents and social media publications by Chinese authorities and local governments that originate directly from the Chinese state, and that his work remains "scientifically tenable", even if it is "instrumentalised by the US government for its harsh anti-China policy". When asked about Zenz in his role as "the Western media's most important source for the accusations against the Chinese government" and his claims of "a demographic genocide campaign", sinologist Björn Alpermann of Julius-Maximilians-Universität Würzburg explained in a 2022 interview with the weekly Jungleworld that it is not necessary to "sympathise with Adrian Zenz as a person or approve of the political agenda of his donors to come to the conclusion that birth control in Xinjiang has been tightened".

In Neues Deutschland, Uwe Behrens described a report published in March 2021 by the Newlines Institute for Strategy and Policy as a "string of unverified secondary information and statements by Uyghurs living abroad", which was "ultimately based on the internet research of anthropologist Adrian Zenz".

In 2023, political theorists Alain Brossat and Juan Alberto Ruiz Casado described Zenz as "instrumental" in the process that renamed China's campaign in Xinjiang from "mass arbitrary detentions and related violations" to "genocide". They described the arguments in his 2018 work as "academically flimsy" and criticized his 2019 work for containing misleading or directly false claims.

== Personal life ==
Zenz is a lapsed Catholic-turned-born-again Christian, and he has stated that he feels "led by God" in his research on Chinese Muslims and other minority groups. He co-authored a book re-examining biblical end-times in 2012 with his father-in-law.

== Selected works ==
- with Sias, Marlon L. (5 November 2012). Worthy to Escape: Why All Believers Will Not Be raptured Before the Tribulation. Bloomington, Indiana: Author. ISBN 978-144976908-6. OCLC 817597374.
- — (2013). 'Tibetanness' Under Threat? : Neo-integrationism, Minority Education and Career Strategies in Qinghai, P.R. China. Inner Asia book series. Vol. 9. Leiden: Global Oriental. doi:10.1163/9789004257979. ISBN 978-90-04-25796-2.
- with Leibold, James (14 March 2017). "Xinjiang's rapidly evolving security state". China Brief. Vol. 17, no. 4. Washington, DC: The Jamestown Foundation. OCLC 506242180.
- with Leibold, James (21 September 2017). "Chen Quanguo: The strongman behind Beijing's securitization strategy in Tibet and Xinjiang". China Brief. Vol. 17, no. 12.
- — (6 September 2018). "'Thoroughly reforming them towards a healthy heart attitude': China's political re-education campaign in Xinjiang" (PDF). Central Asian Survey. 38 (1). Informa UK: 102–128. doi:10.1080/02634937.2018.1507997. ISSN 0263-4937. doi:10.31235/osf.io/4j6rq.
  - Condensed: "New evidence for China's political re-education campaign in Xinjiang". China Brief. Vol. 18, no. 10. 15 May 2018.
- — (1 July 2019). "Brainwashing, police guards and coercive internment: Evidence from Chinese government documents about the nature and extent of Xinjiang's 'vocational training internment camps'". Journal of Political Risk. 7 (7). New York City: Corr Analytics. ISSN 2831-3089. OCLC 1302593642.
- — (4 July 2019). "Break their roots: Evidence for China's parent-child separation campaign in Xinjiang". Journal of Political Risk. 7 (7).
- — (10 December 2019). "Beyond the camps: Beijing's grand scheme of forced labor, poverty alleviation and social control in Xinjiang". Journal of Political Risk. 7 (12). doi:10.31235/osf.io/8tsk2.
- — (17 February 2020). "The Karakax list: Dissecting the anatomy of Beijing's internment drive in Xinjiang". Journal of Political Risk. 8 (2).
- — (June 2020). Sterilizations, IUDs, and mandatory birth control: The CCP's campaign to suppress Uyghur birthrates in Xinjiang (PDF) (Report). The Jamestown Foundation.
- — (September 2020). "Xinjiang's system of militarized vocational training comes to Tibet". China Brief. Vol. 20, no. 17.
- — (14 December 2020). Coercive labor in Xinjiang: Labor transfer and the mobilization of ethnic minorities to pick cotton (Report). Center for Global Policy. Archived from the original on 7 February 2021.
- — (24 August 2021). "'End the dominance of the Uyghur ethnic group': An analysis of Beijing's population optimization strategy in southern Xinjiang". Central Asian Survey. 40 (3): 291–312. doi:10.1080/02634937.2021.1946483. ISSN 0263-4937. doi:10.31235/osf.io/d34ce.
- — (9 December 2021). The Xinjiang papers: An analysis of key findings and implications for the Uyghur tribunal in London (PDF) (Report). overview of the 11 leaked Chinese government documents.

== See also ==
- Ethan Gutmann
