= Mercator Institute for China Studies =

German think tank

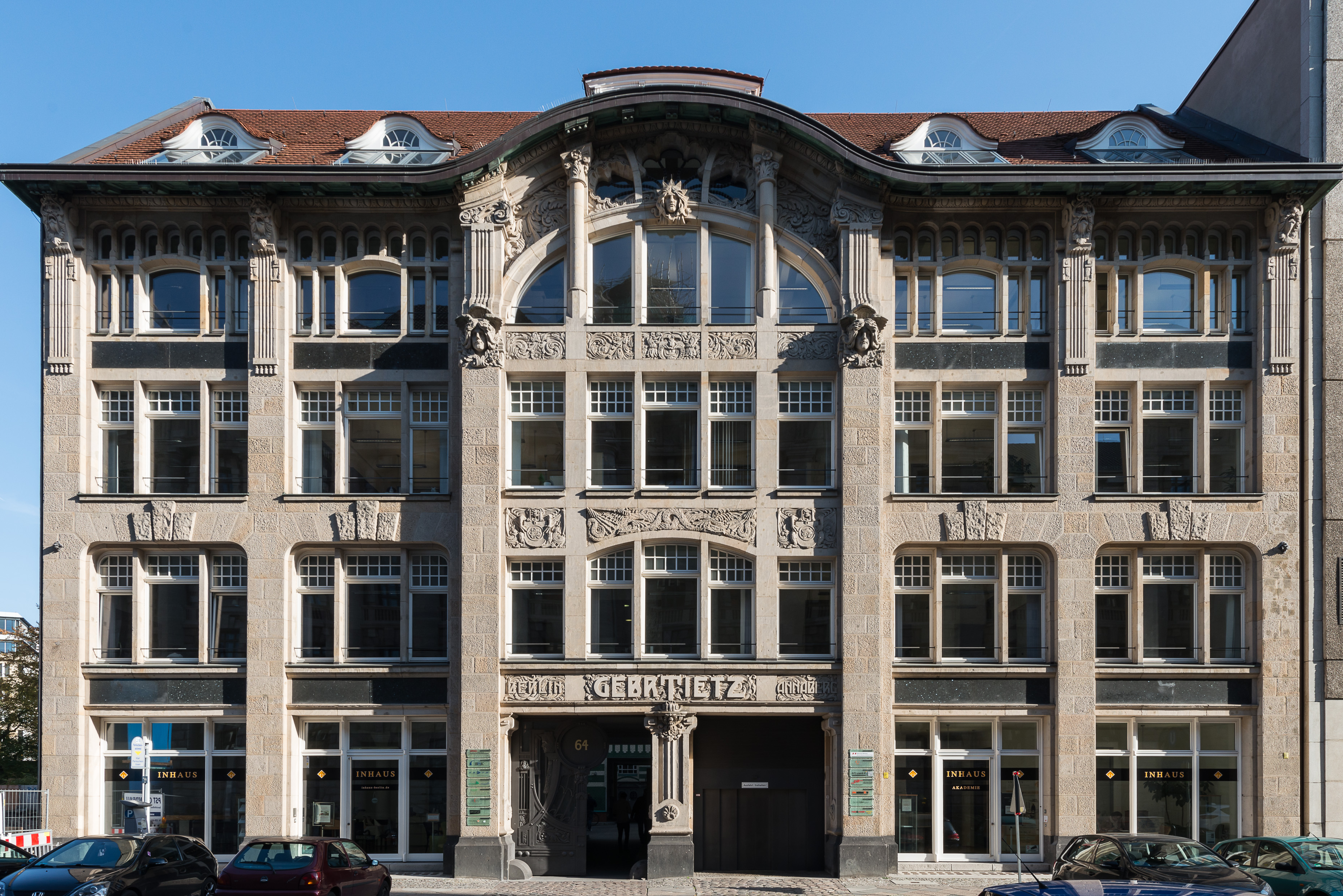
- Formation: 2013; 13 years ago
- Founder: Stiftung Mercator
- Headquarters: Berlin, Germany
- Director: Mikko Huotari
- Staff: 20 academic, 30 in total
- Website: www.merics.org

The Mercator Institute for China Studies (MERICS) is a nonprofit German think tank with a focus on China founded in 2013 by Stiftung Mercator, a private foundation in Germany. The institute's focus is on political, economic, social, technological and ecological developments in China and their global impacts.

== History ==
Based in Berlin, MERICS was founded in 2013 by the private foundation Stiftung Mercator. MERICS is a non-profit organization. Stiftung Mercator is its only shareholder and has committed to provide the institute with 33 million euros in funding for the period from 2013 to the end of 2023.

Its founding director is Sebastian Heilmann, who after five years at the helm of the institute returned to his position as a professor for the political economy of China at the University of Trier. In August 2018, Frank N. Pieke (Director and CEO) took over the position of director. The institute is currently led by Mikko Huotari as Executive Director and Ursula Noack as Chief Financial Officer.

In March 2021, MERICS was one of several entities sanctioned by the Chinese government for "severely harm[ing] China's sovereignty and interests and maliciously spread lies and disinformation," subsequent to sanctions imposed by the European Union on Chinese government officials in Xinjiang for their role in what the EU Council called a "large-scale surveillance, detention, and indoctrination program targeting Muslim ethnic minorities." In July 2025, sanctions on MERICS were at least partially removed, with Director Mikko Huotari being able to travel to China.

== Research ==
MERICS conducts interdisciplinary research on political, economic and social trends in China and their impact on Europe and the global community. The institute advises decision makers in politics, industry and civil society. It also provides analyses and opinion pieces to the public on current trends. MERICS employs a staff of about 30.

The publications of MERICS include topics like:

- The future of digitization in China – from industrial upgrading (Made in China 2025, e-mobility) and the internet economy (e-commerce) to big-data enabled social monitoring (Social Credit System, IT-backed authoritarianism, Digital Leninism)
- China's emergence as a global player in international institutions (G20, United Nations, WTO) and regimes (Paris Agreement on climate change), and as a shaper of new multilateral initiatives (Belt and Road Initiative, Asian Infrastructure Investment Bank)
- China's growing presence as an investor in Europe
- China's political and social development under Chinese Communist Party general secretary Xi Jinping

== Partnerships and events ==
MERICS is an official partner of the Munich Security Conference and an academic partner of the bi-annual Hamburg Summit – China meets Europe. The institute also has partnerships with the Faculty of East Asian Studies at the Ruhr-Universität Bochum and with the University of Duisburg-Essen. The institute hosts regular events from internal expert roundtables to public panels online and at its offices in Berlin.

Formerly, MERICS organized the annual "Trierer China-Gespräche" (Trier China Talks) in cooperation with the alumni association of Trier University, the Konrad Adenauer Foundation, and the Bundesakademie für Sicherheitspolitik (BAKS).
