= National Anti-Fraud Center =

Chinese anti-fraud app

- Other names: 国家反诈中心
- Original authors: Criminal Investigation Bureau, Ministry of Public Security
- Release: March 10, 2021
- Operating system: Android, iOS and HarmonyOS 5
- Available in: Simplified Chinese
- Type: Fraud prevention
- License: Proprietary

National Anti-Fraud Center
- Simplified Chinese: 国家反诈中心
Transcriptions
Standard Mandarin
- Hanyu Pinyin: Guójiā Fǎnzhà Zhōngxīn

National Anti-Fraud Center is a Chinese fraud prevention and reporting mobile application developed by the Ministry of Public Security. It was first published in March 2021. The app advertises that it can maintain telecommunications network security by blocking suspicious content and creating channels for reporting online fraud and raising awareness for fraud prevention, and is heavily promoted by the Ministry of Public Security. The app was temporarily removed from the App Store in 2024 and 2025, but has since been restored.

== Functionalities ==
The National Anti-Fraud Center app detects received calls, SMS and downloaded apps, and if suspicious content is found and identified as fraudulent, it will actively warn users. The app also provides a "I want to report" function, which enables users to submit suspicious cell phone numbers, SMS, websites, apps and other information to the public security department for processing. In addition, the app also pushes articles on fraud prevention to users to promote fraud prevention.

For iOS devices, the app is only available for Apple Accounts with the region set to "China mainland" and cannot be downloaded from accounts set to other regions.

== Reception ==
The app has received mixed reception, with Chinese state broadcaster CCTV stating in September 2022 that the app had successfully intercepted 280 million scam calls and 400 million scam text messages. However, despite government campaigns encouraging installation, the app was poorly received by some users. Quartz reported that the app received a rating of 2.6 out of 5 on the App Store.

=== Controversies ===
The app has also faced many controversies. Citizens are reportedly forced to install it on their phone despite its excessive permission requests, privacy violations, and identifying and interrogating users who visit overseas financial websites.

Registration for this application requires facial recognition, in addition to scanning the phone for installed applications. Some Hong Kong media outlets reported that citizens in Shenzhen were forced to install it on their smartphone, leading to complaints. Citizens who installed the app and visited foreign financial news websites like Bloomberg were reported by French state broadcaster Radio France Internationale to have been tracked by the app and interrogated by the police.

== See also ==
- Phone fraud
- Scam center
- Xuexi Qiangguo
- Green Dam Youth Escort
- Jingwang Weishi
- Mass surveillance in China
