= Dahua Technology =

Chinese video surveillance products company

Zhejiang Dahua Technology Co., Ltd.
- Native name: 大華技術股份有限公司
- Type: Public company; partially state-owned (11.67%)
- Traded as: SZSE: 002236
- Industry: Video surveillance
- Founded: 2001; 25 years ago
- Founder: Fu Liquan
- Headquarters: Hangzhou, Zhejiang, China
- Area served: Worldwide
- Products: Security cameras, network cameras, HDCVI analog-to-HD solutions, NVR/DVR, PTZ cameras, fisheye cameras
- Revenue: $4.98 billion (2021)
- Owner: Fu Liquan; China Mobile; Central Huijin Investment
- Number of employees: +23,000 (2023)

Chinese name
- Simplified Chinese: 浙江大华技术股份有限公司
- Traditional Chinese: 浙江大華科技股份有限公司
Transcriptions
Standard Mandarin
- Hanyu Pinyin: Zhèjiāng Dàhuá Kējì Gǔfèn Yǒuxiàn Gōngsī
- Website: www.dahuatech.com

Zhejiang Dahua Technology Co., Ltd. (commonly known as Dahua Technology) is a publicly traded company based in Binjiang District, Hangzhou, which manufactures video surveillance equipment. A minority of Dahua is state-owned (11.67% as of 2023).

Dahua was founded in 2001 by former defense industry technician Fu Liquan, who serves as the company's chairman and the Secretary of its Communist Party committee. As of 2021, Dahua is the second-largest video surveillance company in the world in terms of revenue, after Hikvision.

== History ==
Dahua was founded in 2001 by Fu Liquan and some of his former colleagues from a state-owned electronics equipment factory. The company initially focused on manufacturing digital video recorders. In 2008, Dahua Technology undertook its initial public offering on the Shenzhen Stock Exchange. In 2018, Dahua acquired security video camera company Lorex. By 2019, following the rollout of the Chinese government's "Sharp Eyes" surveillance program, Dahua had grown to become the second largest video surveillance company in the world.

Dahua is a provider of a suite of digital Smart City products which are marketed for "Safe Cities." In November 2020, Dahua won a US$9 million, 1,900-camera smart city project with the public security bureau of Jiexiu. In April 2021, Motorola Solutions announced that IndigoVision, a Motorola Solutions-owned company, would no longer relabel Dahua cameras, citing U.S. NDAA and supply-chain concerns.

In 2021, Best Buy, Home Depot, and Lowe's stopped selling cameras from Dahua brand Lorex due to concerns about Dahua's complicity in surveillance and human rights violations in Xinjiang. The Security Industry Association, a U.S.-based trade organization representing electronic and physical security solutions providers the United States, terminated Dahua Technology's membership on 1 June 2021, citing unnamed violations of its code of ethics. In November 2021, Dahua was named in the Secure Equipment Act as one of several entities prohibited from receiving U.S. telecommunication equipment licenses due to national security reasons. During the same month, Dahua provided an electronic security system to processed food company Empresa Panamena de Alimentos (EPA) in Panama. At the end of 2022, Dahua Technology entered into an agreement to sell Lorex to Taiwan-based Skywatch for $72 million. In February 2023, the company announced that the sale had been completed.

In 2022, Dahua provided video technology for the Beijing Winter Olympics.

Dahua Technology provided technical support and smart applications for Yellow Dragon Sports Center during the 2022 Asian Games.

In July 2023, Dahua Technology signed an agreement with the Semper Altius School Network and the Anáhuac High School Network in Mexico.

Dahua was a sponsor of the 2023 Tour de Langkawi. It was one of the providers of the main security systems for the 2023 Pan American Games. In April 2023, Dahua designed a security project for Ibagué. In November 2023, Dahua sold 90 million of its Leapmotor shares to Stellantis, ending their equity affiliation.

In 2024, Dahua sold its shares in its U.S. subsidiary, Dahua Technology USA, to a unit of Central Motion Picture Corporation. The same year, Taiwan's Ministry of Justice Investigation Bureau announced an investigation into Dahua for allegedly obfuscating its presence on the island by setting up "two private locations" and listing its employees as working for another company.

=== Sanctions and bans ===
In November 2022, the UK prohibited the use of Dahua equipment in government buildings.

In February 2023, Australia's Department of Defence announced that it will remove cameras made by Dahua from its buildings.

In June 2023, Ukraine's National Agency on Corruption Prevention included Dahua on its International Sponsors of War list for allegedly supplying military equipment to Russia. In March 2024, Ukraine removed public access to the list.

In December 2023, Quebec banned the use of Dahua technology in government.

==== United States ====
In October 2019, the U.S. government placed Dahua on the Bureau of Industry and Security's Entity List for its role in mass surveillance of Uyghurs in Xinjiang and of other ethnic and religious minorities in China. The John S. McCain National Defense Authorization Act for Fiscal Year 2019 barred the use of Dahua equipment in U.S. federal contracts.

In March 2021, the Federal Communications Commission (FCC) declared that Dahua services and equipment "pose an unacceptable risk to U.S. national security." That same year, Sam Biddle of The Intercept reported that the U.S. government continued to purchase Dahua-manufactured equipment post-NDAA, raising questions about the effectiveness of the sanctions.

In October 2022, the United States Department of Defense added Dahua to a list of "Chinese military companies" operating in the U.S.

After President Joe Biden signed into law the Secure Equipment Act of 2021, in November 2022, the FCC imposed an "Interim Freeze Order" on Dahua Technology for national security reasons, effectively barring the sale or import of new equipment made by the company. Dahua Technology has stated that this "Interim Freeze Order" does not impact any of its existing products, nor does it prohibit the company from introducing new products in the U.S. Dahua Technology has remained ambiguous about whether or not it will issue a legal challenge to the FCC in the wake of its order. In the wake of Dahua Technology's statement, surveillance industry publication IPVM issued a report accusing Dahua Technology of "misleading" the American public through its use of the phrase "interim freeze".

In March 2025, the FCC opened an investigation into Dahua Technology and other Chinese companies regarding operations in the U.S. in violation of restrictions. In October 2025, Texas attorney general Ken Paxton announced an investigation into Lorex, citing national security concerns with Dahua as a Lorex supplier. In February 2026, Paxton sued Lorex, alleging that it maintains ties with Dahua.

== Corporate affairs ==
=== Shareholders ===
Dahua Technology is majority owned by Fu Liquan and his wife Chen Ailing. As of 31 December 2020, Fu owned 34.18% of shares as the largest shareholder, while Chen owned 2.38%.

According to its 2020 annual financial report, Dahua Technology is also partially state-owned by Central Huijin Asset Management and China Galaxy Securities Co., Ltd. at 1.05% and 1.82% respectively. Central Huijin Investment is a state-owned enterprise and wholly owned subsidiary of China Investment Corporation, a sovereign wealth fund that reports to the State Council of the People's Republic of China.

In March 2023, Dahua sold $740 million in new stock to China Mobile, closing a deal which had been announced two years earlier. As a result, China Mobile holds a minority stake of 8.8% in Dahua. Combined, the three state interests amount to 11.67% state ownership of Dahua.

=== Partnerships ===
In 2016, Dahua partnered with Dell to build smart security systems. In 2017, Dahua partnered with Beijing University of Posts and Telecommunications (BUPT) to build a joint intelligent video laboratory. Amazon Web Services provides cloud services to Dahua.

In 2019, Allianz Parque contracted Dahua for the arena's security and surveillance systems. Later that year, Dahua began to provide video surveillance to the Vatican Museums over a 5-year period.

In August 2022, Dahua partnered with ABCOM Distribution LLC for a distribution partnership in MENA. In February 2023, Dahua Technology and Al-Futtaim Engineering and Technologies, part of Al-Futtaim Group, partnered to bring security technology to Saudi Arabia.

In May 2024, Dahua announced a partnership with the Dutch esports organization and EAFC academy Team Gullit, in which Dahua will supply Team Gullit staff and players with gaming monitors.

== Cybersecurity vulnerabilities ==
In September 2016, the largest DDoS attack to date, on KrebsOnSecurity.com, was traced back to a botnet. According to internet provider Level 3 Communications, the most commonly infected devices in this botnet were Dahua and Dahua OEM cameras and DVRs. Nearly one million Dahua devices were infected with the BASHLITE malware. A vulnerability in most of Dahua's cameras allowed "anyone to take full control of the devices' underlying Linux operating system just by typing a random username with too many characters." This was exploited, and malware installed on devices that allowed them to be used in "both DDoS attacks as well as for extortion campaigns using ransomware."

In March 2017 a backdoor into many Dahua cameras and DVRs was discovered by security researchers working for a Fortune 500 company. The vulnerability had been activated on cameras within the Fortune 500 company's network, and the data trafficked to China through the company's firewall. Using a web browser, the vulnerability allowed unauthorized people to remotely download a device's database of usernames and password hashes and subsequently gain access to it. By exploiting it, attackers could potentially see live feed from the camera or even turn the camera into a tool for launching cyberattacks. Dahua issued a firmware update to fix the vulnerability in 11 of its products. Security researchers discovered that the updated firmware contained the same vulnerability but that the vulnerability had been relocated to a different part of the code. This was characterized by the security researchers as deliberate deception.

In September 2021, Dahua acknowledged an identity authentication bypass vulnerability affecting over 30 device models that, if exploited, can allow attackers to "bypass device identity authentication by constructing malicious data packets." In October 2021, TechCrunch reported that The Home Depot and Best Buy stopped selling Lorex-branded Dahua and Ezviz products.

A BBC Panorama investigation reported in 2023 revealed IPVM were able to gain access to Dahua's surveillance cameras by exploiting a vulnerability in its software in a live demo, and were able to wiretap the room via the connected camera. Dahua patched the exploit via firmware updates once it was reported to them.

== Surveillance technology ==
As of at least 2024, Dahua Technology and its competitor Hikvision supply a combined 40% of the global market for surveillance cameras.

Dahua has played a role in the mass surveillance of Uyghurs in Xinjiang. In November 2020, after security researchers identified facial identification software code with designations by ethnicity, Dahua removed the code in question from GitHub. In February 2021, the Los Angeles Times published an investigation of Dahua's technology for the purpose of Uyghur surveillance. According to the investigation, Dahua provided a surveillance system that included "real-time Uyghur warnings" with the ability to sort people by ethnicity and skin color.

In May 2023, IPVM reported that Dahua developed a technology that "automatically detects and reports protest signs and protestors' faces to PRC police."

In December 2024, Reuters reported that Dahua and its subsidiaries exited Xinjiang and ceased all operations and projects in the region.
