= Commend International =

Commend International GmbH
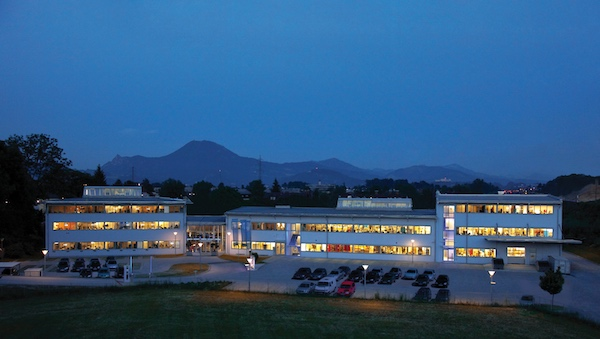
- Commend's R&D and production offices in Salzburg, Austria
- Type: Public
- Industry: Intercom: security solutions
- Founded: 1971
- Headquarters: R&D and Production offices in Salzburg, Austria
- Area served: Worldwide
- Products: Intercom and security hardware & software
- Number of employees: Salzburg: 250, worldwide: 600
- Parent: TKH Group N. V.
- Divisions: Buildings; Transport & Infrastructure; Industry; Maritime
- Subsidiaries: 23 sales offices worldwide
- Website: commend.com

Commend International is an Austrian-based technology provider that specialises in intercom audio/video security systems.

== Company history ==
Commend was established in 1971 with a focus on research and inventions for intercom automation and background noise suppression.

== Products ==
- In the early 2000s, Commend introduced OpenDuplex as a further development of full duplex speech transmission technology.
- In 2012 Commend ventured into virtual server technology with a software-based Intercom server, marketed under the name "VirtuoSIS".
- In 2023 Commend launched an AI-driven voice assistant for call centres under the name "Ivy". It won a New Products & Solutions Award ("Communications & Networking" category) from the Security Industry Association (SIA) upon its launch at the ISC West 2023 security technology trade show.

== Projects ==
- City of Nice (Southern France): large-scale city-wide network of "yellow button" emergency call points; they proved helpful during the 2020 terrorist attack on the city
- "London Underground": large-scale network of help point terminals at stations
- Indian Smart Cities: emergency call systems for the country's "Smart Cities Mission" initiative (136 emergency call boxes at strategic junctions PAN City)
- Ospedale Galeazzi Sant'Ambrogio (Gruppo San Donato): extensive communication network for a major hospital/medical & health care centre near Milan, Italy
