= Gong Hongjia =

Hong Kong businessman

- Born: 1965 (age 60–61); China
- Other name: Kung Hung Ka
- Education: Huazhong University of Science and Technology
- Occupations: Angel investor; businessman
- Known for: Hikvision (co-owner); Tecsun (co-founder)
- Board member of: Hikvision
- Children: 2

Chinese name
- Simplified Chinese: 龚虹嘉
- Traditional Chinese: 龔虹嘉
Transcriptions
Standard Mandarin
- Hanyu Pinyin: Gōng Hóngjiā
Yue: Cantonese
- Jyutping: Gung1 Hung4 Gaa1

Gong Hongjia (Chinese: 龚虹嘉; pinyin: Gōng Hóngjiā; born 1965), also known by his official Hong Kong transliteration Kung Hung Ka, is a Chinese billionaire businessman (with Hong Kong permanent resident status), vice-chairman and the second largest shareholder in Hikvision, a security equipment supplier. He was ranked 15 in the Forbes 2017 China Rich List, as well as 144th in 2021 Forbes billionaires list in May 2021, with a net worth of US$14.4 billion at that time.

== Early life ==
Gong was born in mainland China in 1965. He was educated at Huazhong University of Science and Technology, graduating with a degree in computer science.

== Career ==
Gong became a trader of electronic goods in Southern China (Guangzhou and British Hong Kong) after his graduation. He emigrated to Hong Kong in 1992, five years before the handover of the colony to China. He formerly owned radio manufacturer Tecsun (now known as Tecsun Science & Technology) and smart card company Watchdata. In 2001, he co-invested in Hikvision for 49% stake. In 2017, after Hikvision became a listed company, he sold part of the shares he owned, causing his fortune to reach $13 billion, up from 5.4 billion the previous year, with his rise in rank reflected in the Hurun Report.

Gong also owned Wealth Strategy Holding, which in turn partly owned another listed company Yichang HEC Changjiang Pharmaceutical in 2015.

Gong was also actively invested in the property market of Hong Kong.

== Personal life ==
He is married with two children and lives in Hong Kong.
