= IPVM =

US surveillance industry research group

- Company type: Corporation
- Website type: Investigative journalism, technology journalism
- Available in: English
- Founded: 2008; 18 years ago
- Headquarters: Bethlehem, Pennsylvania, United States
- Country of origin: United States
- Area served: Worldwide
- Founder: John Honovich
- President: John Honovich
- CEO: John Honovich
- Industry: Closed-circuit television, access control
- Services: Product testing
- Parent: IP Video Market Info Inc.
- Website: ipvm.com
- Advertising: No
- Commercial: Yes
- Registration: Optional
- Launched: 2008
- Current status: Live

Internet Protocol Video Market (IPVM) is a security and surveillance industry research group and trade publication based in Bethlehem, Pennsylvania that focuses on reviewing and reporting on video-surveillance technology.

IPVM was launched in 2008 out of Hawaii, when founder John Honovich had left the surveillance industry after becoming disillusioned with what he described as "overstated marketing claims" that pervaded the industry. Soon after launching, IPVM's headquarters moved to Pennsylvania, where most of its employees were living. The website began as a news aggregator, though the company would grow to produce original investigations and conduct its own reviews of surveillance equipment. Throughout most of its history, the publication's readership and reach has been specific to the surveillance industry.

IPVM gained broader recognition in 2020 and 2021 for its investigative reporting revealing how China-based technology firms Alibaba, Dahua Technology, Huawei and Megvii filed patents for face detection technology designed to target Uyghurs. The company's investigations on surveillance equipment used in China have been widely cited by major newspapers in the United States, including The Wall Street Journal, The New York Times, and The Washington Post. Its reports have drawn the ire of Chinese video surveillance equipment company Hikvision, whom IPVM revealed to have been providing surveillance equipment and technology key in the Xinjiang re-education camps. China has been critical of the company, blocking the company's website within Great Firewall, while China's Ministry of Foreign Affairs has denied the validity of IPVM's work relating to Huawei, claiming it was "slander". In 2023 and 2024, respectively, IPVM reporting was cited by the U.S. Department of State in its Xinjiang 2022 International Religious Freedom Report and by the Select Committee on the CCP in a report on how U.S. venture capital aids the Chinese Communist Party. The US Government has imposed sanctions on Hikvision and Dahua.

Unlike many trade publications focused on the surveillance industry, IPVM does not accept advertising from manufacturers of surveillance technology, owing to its founder's concern around the potential for advertisers to affect the publication's editorial independence. Instead, the privately owned website runs on a subscription-based model; as of January 2020, IPVM said that it maintained over 10,000 subscribers.

== History ==
IPVM was launched in 2008 out of Hawaii, when founder John Honovich had left the surveillance industry after becoming disillusioned with what he described as "overstated marketing claims" that pervaded the industry. Soon after launching, IPVM's headquarters moved to Pennsylvania, where most of its employees were living. The website began as a news aggregator, though the company would grow to produce original investigations and conduct its own reviews of surveillance equipment. However, the publication would begin to gain notoriety more broadly following its investigations into Chinese surveillance firms. After publishing reports critical of Chinese video surveillance firms Hikvision and Dahua Technology, the Chinese government blocked IPVM behind its Great Firewall on October 19, 2018. Reporters Without Borders subsequently condemned the Chinese government's decision.

In December 2019, IPVM would move again, leaving its headquarters in Lehigh County, Pennsylvania for a 12,000 square feet (1,100 m^{2}) research facility in the residential Miller Heights neighborhood Bethlehem, Pennsylvania. The new location allows IPVM to conduct on-site video surveillance hardware and software tests on products from a variety of leading video surveillance manufacturers. In March 2021, the Journal of Biomedical Optics published a study by five IPVM researchers and a U.S. military medical service officer on the problems with COVID-19 fever screening devices. The study was funded by IPVM and was conducted at the new facility.

In 2023, Time recognized John Honovich, IPVM's founder, as one of the 100 Most Influential People in AI, citing IPVM as "a leading source of information on the harms of facial-recognition technology" as well as the organization's influence on U.S. policy.

On March 4, 2025, the Chinese Ministry of Commerce placed 15 U.S. entities (including IPVM) on its export control list, barring the export of dual-use commodities to that business.

=== China technology companies' involvement in the persecution of Uyghurs ===
In May 2021, the BBC aired Are You Scared Yet, Human?, a Panorama documentary featuring an interview with IPVM on Dahua Technology's, Hikvision's, and Huawei's roles in developing mass surveillance technologies in China, including technological products designed to identify Uyghurs. In September 2021, IPVM presented an expert statement to the Uyghur Tribunal in the United Kingdom.

In 2022, IPVM, in association with Ethan Gutmann from the Victims of Communism Memorial Foundation and Bob Fu from ChinaAid, among others, helped Ovalbek Turdakun, a Kyrgyz Christian Xinjiang re-education camps survivor, escape to the United States, where he was granted significant public benefit parole. Turdakun gave first-person witness testimony about his alleged detention during an April press conference led by IPVM's Conor Healy and the Victims of Communism Memorial Foundation.

In 2023, IPVM obtained a Hikvision private meeting recording during which Pierre-Richard Prosper, who had been hired by Hikvision to investigate its ties to human rights abuses in Xinjiang, said his team was "not going to absolve" Hikvision and that the company had bid on Chinese government contracts that targeted Uyghurs as a group. The Register later reported that IPVM found that Hikvision and Nvidia had been retained by Chengmai County authorities as recently as December 2022 to provide Uyghur-identifying technologies.

== Joint investigations ==
In 2020, The Washington Post and IPVM jointly reported on Huawei's testing of facial recognition technology designed to identify Uyghurs.

In 2021, IPVM partnered with TechCrunch to examine U.S. local governments' purchases and U.S. retailers' sales of surveillance equipment manufactured by companies linked to abuses of Uyghurs as well as with The Intercept to investigate the U.S. military's purchase of sanctioned cameras for the U.S. embassy in Caracas.

In 2022, IPVM partnered with the MIT Technology Review to examine an Israeli company's plan to develop DNA-based facial recognition and was cited in an ESPN exposé on Brooklyn Nets owner Joseph Tsai discussing Alibaba's, Megvii's and SenseTime's Uyghur-targeting software.

In 2023, the BBC cited IPVM in its reporting on shortcomings with Evolv's AI weapons scanners.

== Reaction ==
=== Evolv ===
In March 2024, Evolv, a publicly traded Massachusetts-based security and technology company contemporaneously under investigation by the FTC and the SEC, issued a press release criticizing IPVM as a "biased" "tabloid publication" that has published "inaccurate and misleading coverage."

=== Hikvision ===
In July 2021, Hikvision resigned its membership in the Security Industry Association, a U.S.-based trade association, citing in its resignation letter that it had been "harassed and maligned" by IPVM. Hikvision further claimed that IPVM had engaged in "unethical hacking" of its cameras and that IPVM had published "misleading blog stories."

In January 2022, Axios reported that Hikvision had asked U.S. congressional ethics officials to investigate potential lobbying disclosure violations by IPVM. U.S. senator Marco Rubio and congresswoman Claudia Tenney retweeted the Axios article, urging their congressional colleagues to ignore Hikvision while claiming that Hikvision's accusations against IPVM amounted to censorship.

=== Chinese state media ===
In November 2021, Global Times, a tabloid under the auspices of the Chinese Communist Party, published an article by Gao Lei writing under a pen name to its Baidu and WeChat accounts criticizing IPVM as a U.S. government mouthpiece parading as a civilian company. Lei also compared IPVM founder John Honovich to German anthropologist Adrian Zenz and claimed that another IPVM employee is "a rather extreme white right-winger."

In January 2022, China Daily, a Chinese Communist Party-owned newspaper, published an article and a video noting IPVM's work with the BBC, The New York Times, Reuters, and The Washington Post, criticizing it as a "mass surveillance company" that has "been sharing tons of data they have collected on Xinjiang and on other Chinese entities."
