= InfiRay =

Miniaturized infrared thermal imaging camera manufacturer

- Company type: Private
- Industry: Thermal imaging
- Founded: 2009
- Headquarters: Yantai, China
- Area served: Worldwide
- Key people: Fangyan Zhao (chairman)
- Products: Hand-held infrared thermal imaging cameras
- Brands: P2 Pro
- Parent: Yantai Raytron Technology
- Website: www.infiray.com

InfiRay, also known as IRay, fully referred to as IRay Technology Co., Ltd., is a Chinese optical components manufacturer founded in 2009. The company specializes in the production of consumer-grade thermal infrared imagers, especially tiny thermal cameras. The InfiRay P2 Pro is one of InfiRay's representative products. Thermal sensors made by the firm can be used for dedicated cameras and cellphones. It previously served as an OEM for US company Certify, for which it produced fever screeners.

InfiRay is a subsidiary of Raytron Technology, a semiconductor maker listed on the Shanghai Stock Exchange. Headquartered in Yantai, a city in Shandong province, the company has established presences in the US, Australia, and Russia. In April 2024, during the Russo-Ukrainian War, it provided Russia with military optics for tanks and armored vehicles. In May, it was added to the SDN List.

== History ==
InfiRay was established in 2009 in Yantai, Shandong. In 2020, the company opened a branch in Texas, and established its US headquarters there in December 2023.

In January 2022, InfiRay attended the SHOT Show in Las Vegas. It exhibited at the MCE 2022 in Italy. In March 2023, the firm made an appearance at the Middle East Energy Exhibition in Dubai.

== Products ==
In June 2022, InfiRay T2S+ thermal cameras became available in Japan.

In January 2023, InfiRay introduced a hand-held thermal imager. As a USB-C attachment, it allows mobile phone users to peek into the infrared range usi.

In September 2023, the InfiRay P2 Pro was launched, which weighs a mere 9 grams. The accessory is available for iPhone and Android phones.

According to Yole, Chinese companies accounted for 38% of global market share in thermal imager shipments at end of year 2022 and were led by Hikvision and InfiRay.
