= Tecsun =

Chinese electronics company

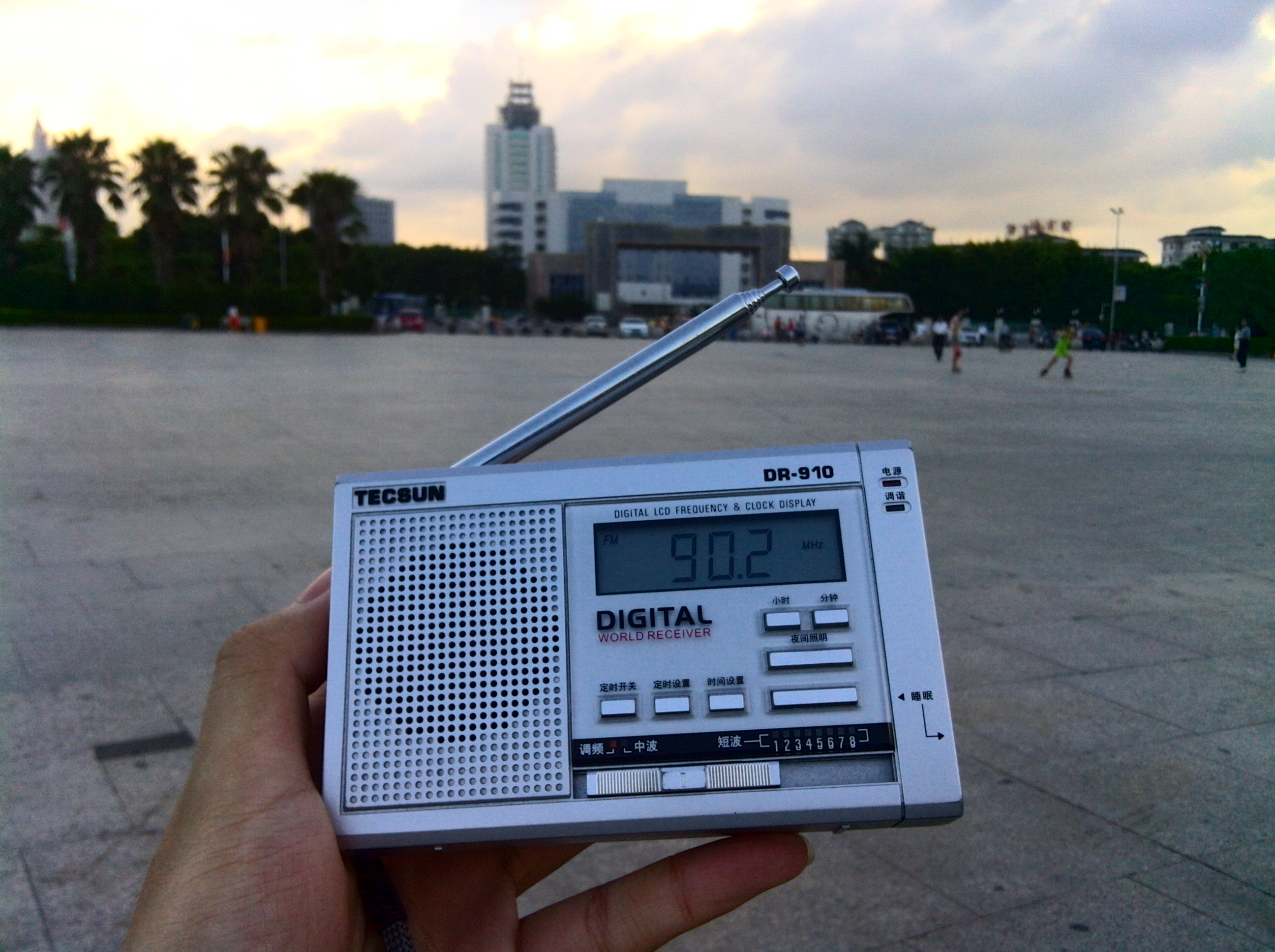
Tecsun DR-910

Tecsun Co., Ltd. (Chinese: 德生; Jyutping: dak^{1} saang^{1}; pinyin: Déshēng) is a Chinese company founded in 1994 and headquartered in Dongguan, Guangdong. It designs and manufactures radios, from simple handheld AM/FM receivers to more sophisticated digital units with shortwave, longwave, airband, and SSB capability. Some of their products are rebranded and sold by Etón Corporation.

According to their About Us page, Tecsun has over 500 employees to manufacture approximately 5,000,000 units annually. They also have 35 Customer Services Centres throughout China, which is incorporated into their Engineering Department and they have an ISO 9001 Quality Standard Management Factory in Dongguan and have also successfully applied for CCC, RoHS, FCC and CE Certifications for their products.
