= Mass surveillance in China =

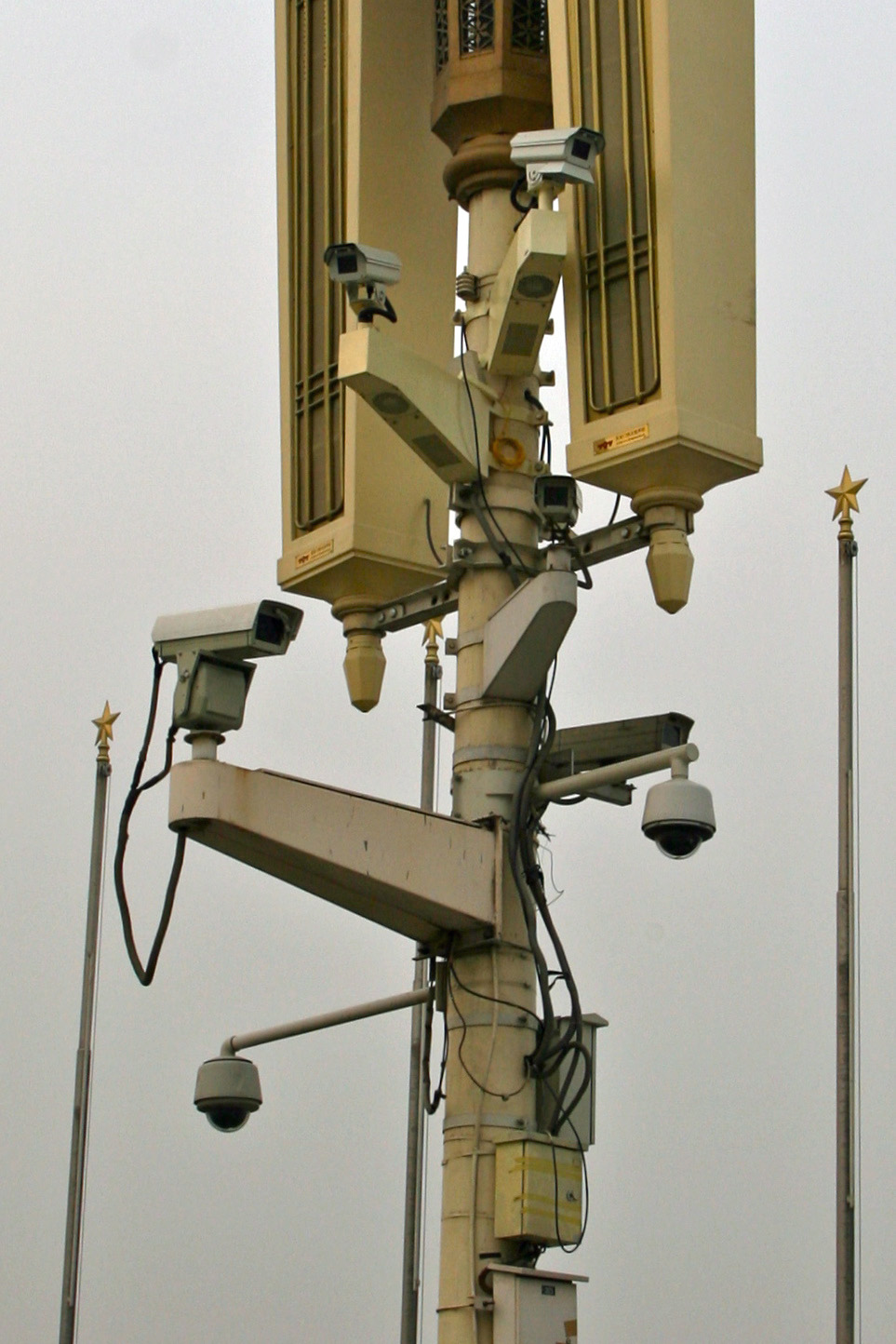
Surveillance cameras at Tiananmen Square in 2009. In 2019, Comparitech reported that 8 out of 10 of the most monitored cities in the world are in China.

The People's Republic of China maintains the largest and most sophisticated mass surveillance system in the world. Surveillance is primarily conducted through government entities, although corporate surveillance in connection with the CCP and Chinese government is also prevalent. China monitors its citizens through Internet surveillance, camera surveillance, and through other digital technologies. As of 2023, the country had over 700 million surveillance cameras. The surveillance has become increasingly widespread and grown in sophistication under Xi Jinping's administration. In the 2020s, China started integrating artificial intelligence into its surveillance systems.

== Background ==
Mass surveillance has significantly expanded under the PRC Cybersecurity Law (2016) and with the help of local companies like Tencent, Dahua Technology, Hikvision, SenseTime, ByteDance, Megvii, Yitu Technology, Huawei and ZTE, among many others. As of 2019, it is estimated that 200 million monitoring CCTV cameras of the "Skynet" system have been put to use in mainland China, four times the number of surveillance cameras in the United States. As of August 2023, the country had over 700 million surveillance cameras according to online data, one lens for every two citizens. The coronavirus pandemic has accelerated the implementation of mass surveillance as it has provided a plausible pretext to do so.

== History ==
=== Origin ===
Mass surveillance in China emerged in the Maoist era after the establishment of the People's Republic of China in 1949. Mao invented this mechanism of control that encompassed the entire nation and its people in order to strengthen his power in the newly founded government and detect potential threats to the legitimacy of the CCP and its policies. In the early years, when technology was relatively undeveloped in China, mass surveillance was accomplished through disseminating information by word of mouth. Chinese people kept a watchful eye on one another and reported inappropriate behaviors that infringed upon the dominant social ideals of the time. In the 21st century, mass surveillance has become of part of the CCP's goal of "stability maintenance" in order to detect and prevent protest and dissent in the country.

=== 21st century ===
In 2005, the Chinese government created a mass surveillance system called Skynet. The government revealed Skynet's existence in 2013, by which time the network included over 20 million cameras. In addition to monitoring the general public, cameras were installed outside mosques in the Xinjiang region, temples in Tibet, and the homes of dissidents. Feminists and LGBT rights groups are subject to increased scrutiny.

In 2017, the Chinese government encouraged the use of various mobile phone apps as part of a broader surveillance push. Local regulators launched mobile apps for national security purposes and to allow citizens to report violations.

As of 2018, the most notable surveillance mechanisms were mass camera surveillance on the streets, Internet surveillance, and newly invented surveillance methods based on social credit and identity.

As of 2018, the Chinese central government had also adopted facial recognition technology, surveillance drones, robot police, and big data collection targeting online social media platforms to monitor its citizens.

In 2019, NSA whistleblower Edward Snowden said China's mass surveillance mechanisms and machinery of private communications was "utterly mind-boggling". As of 2019, it was estimated that 200 million monitoring CCTV cameras of the "Skynet" system had been put to use in mainland China, four times as many as the surveillance cameras in the United States. State media in China claim that Skynet is the largest video surveillance system in the world, utilizing facial recognition technology and big data analysis. In 2019, Comparitech reported that 8 out of the 10 most monitored cities in the world are in China, with Chongqing, Shenzhen and Shanghai being the world's top 3. In 2019, China supplied surveillance technology to most of the world, and positioned the country in control over the mass surveillance industry.

According to industry researcher IHS Markit, at the end of 2019, there were 770 million surveillance cameras in the world, with approximately 415.8 million of them located in China. If these trends continue, by the end of 2021 there will be about 1 billion in the world and 540 million in China. The government says this prevents crime, but citizens worry that their data and privacy could be compromised. In late October 2020, Deng Yufeng, an artist, used performance art to highlight how difficult it is to dodge the view of security cameras.

In September 2025, the Associated Press (AP) reported that more than a dozen U.S. tech companies had enabled China's mass surveillance by supplying technology to Chinese police and government entities. The AP reported that the companies – including Silicon Valley heavyweights like IBM, Intel, Thermo Fisher Scientific, and Dell – sold such technology to China despite having reason to know it would be used to target religious and ethnic minorities. The AP reported that IBM, in particular, worked with a Chinese company, Huadi, to design China's "Golden Shield" which allows China to censor the internet and repress dissidents.

On January 31, 2026, China introduced a draft Cybercrime Prevention and Control Law that greatly increased government control over online activity, expanded surveillance, imposed strict real-name registration, and criminalized broad or vague behaviors, raising international concern over restrictions on privacy, free expression, and digital freedoms.

The 2020s saw the integration of artificial intelligence (AI) technologies into the mass surveillance system. HikVision started developing surveillance products that integrate large language models (LLMs) which enable operators to search footage using text prompts to retrieve the relevant video. In 2024, Minister of Public Security Wang Xiaohong issued a call for the police to upgrade their equipment and move towards predictive policing by integrating more advanced AI systems into surveillance technology. In 2026, local governments across China started overhauling the surveillance network by working to replace old infrastructure with new AI-enabled cameras and software which can interpret scenes, identify patterns of behavior and retrieve footage through written prompts, with companies like Hikvision and Huawei supplying the equipment.

=== Timeline ===
- In 2011, the Beijing Municipal Science & Technology Commission proposed a mobile phone tracking program, to be called the Information Platform of Real-time Citizen Movement, which was ostensibly intended to ease traffic flow on the city's streets.
- In the four years up to 2012, 100,000 crimes had reportedly been solved with the aid of surveillance cameras in Guangdong, according to officials. However, a critic said that "one of the most important purposes of such a smart surveillance system is to crack down on social unrest triggered by petitioners and dissidents".
- In 2013, the government saw the severe atmospheric pollution in Chinese cities as a security threat because the closed-circuit television cameras were rendered useless. In December 2013, the Vice Minister of the Ministry of Industry and Information Technology asked China Telecom, a major landline and mobile telephone company, to implement a real name registration scheme.
- In 2014, the Ministry of Industry and Information Technology followed with a request to regulate the dissemination of objectionable information over the network. Also in 2014, China used a government-backed brain and emotional surveillance project on an unprecedented scale in factories, public transport, state-owned companies and the military.
- In January 2014, the State Administration of Press, Publication, Radio, Film, and Television announced that users who wished to upload videos to Chinese websites would be required to use their real names. The agency explained that the requirement was meant to prevent vulgar content, base art forms, exaggerated violence and sexual content in Internet video having a negative effect on society.
- According to an official document released in 2015, the Chinese government aimed to build a nationwide video surveillance network by 2020 to ensure public security, which will be omnipresent, fully networked, working all the time, and fully controllable.(subscription required)
- In 2016, China introduced a cybersecurity law requiring Internet companies to store all network logs for at least six months and to store all personal data and critical information within mainland China. Also in 2016, China deployed AnBot Police Robot equipped with stun weapons and facial recognition cameras to start patrolling the Shenzhen airport.
- In 2018, Chinese law enforcement officials were equipped with facial recognition Smartglasses in order to apprehend criminals, especially drug smugglers. The technology was originally adopted at the 2017 Qingdao International Beer Festival. With its assistance, the police claimed to have captured many criminals, including 25 fugitives, 19 drug smugglers, and 37 plagiarists. Also in 2018, Chinese authorities admitted for the first time that they could access WeChat users' deleted messages without their permission. The Chaohu City Discipline Inspection and Supervision Commission retrieved a suspect's entire conversation history that had already been deleted in one incident.
- In March 2019, China announced a regulation on small video apps to help prevent teenagers' Internet addiction disorder. It allows related apps to forcibly trigger "teenager mode" by tracing users' location and analyzing their behavior. It was used in all small video apps by June 2019. In 2019, China announced that the third generation of Resident Identity Cards will be able to trace locations. Blood information will also be collected and recorded in the card.
- In 2020, Chinese law enforcement officials wore "smart helmets" equipped with AI-powered infrared cameras to detect pedestrians' temperature amid the COVID-19 pandemic. The smart helmets used by the Chinese police also have facial recognition capabilities, license plate recognition and the ability to scan QR codes.
- The Chinese Communist Party implemented a grid system to ensure systematic surveillance of its citizens. Neighborhoods and regions have been divided into grids. Residents of the grids have been recruited to go door to door, inspecting the living spaces in houses and reporting their findings to authorities. The organization of these inspections allows for more detailed searches. The monitors' task is to visit houses regularly and collect information on people, places, events, objects and emotions. In particular, they inspect computers for sites visited and content viewed. The grid workers are members or supporters of the CCP.
- In September 2024 border police in northeastern China were assigned quotas to identify and expel undocumented migrants, and new deportation centers, facial-recognition cameras, and increased boat patrols were put into place along its 1,400-kilometre border with North Korea.

== Technologies ==
=== Internet ===
The Chinese government has been strengthening its tight control over the Internet and digital communication. There are more than 750 million Internet users in China, and their online actions are strictly regulated. In 2017, the Cyberspace Administration of China (CAC) released a new regulation, which imposed restrictions on the production and distribution of online news. The regulation required all platforms, such as online blogs, forums, websites, and social media apps, to be managed by party-sanctioned editorial staff. These staff must obtain approval from the national or local government Internet and information offices and be trained by the central government. As required by the Chinese government, major Internet platforms and messaging services in China established elaborate self-censorship mechanisms. Some have hired teams of thousands to police content and invested in powerful artificial intelligence algorithms. In 2019, on the 30th anniversary of the 1989 Tiananmen Square protests and massacre, China's AI censors cranked up.

Launched in 2011, WeChat, China's most popular messaging app, is under surveillance by Internet police. Any message sent through a WeChat group is monitored by the Chinese technology giant Tencent, the application's operator. All conversations are stored for six months. Even conversations deleted by WeChat users can be retrieved back by Tencent, especially when government authorities seek evidence of a suspect's illegal activities. Authorities have admitted that they can retrieve archived messages once sent on WeChat. Nevertheless, Tencent CEO Ma Huateng stated that his company will not use user chats for big data analysis or invade users' privacy.

In 2017, the Chinese government required all users of Sina Weibo, a microblogging site, to register with their real names and identity numbers by September 15 of that year. Weibo users who refused to register their accounts with real names were not able to post, repost, or comment on the site.

At the beginning of 2018, Ma Huateng, chairman and CEO of Tencent, claimed that WeChat's monthly active users across the globe reached a billion for the first time. Since Tencent cooperates with the central government to implement self-censorship and mass surveillance, it enjoys the dominance of its industry in China. Other messaging apps, such as WhatsApp, Messenger, and Line are mostly blocked or even forced out of the Chinese market.

Chinese Internet users have several ways to circumvent censorship. Netizens generally rely on virtual private networks (VPNs) to access blocked websites and messaging apps. However, in July 2017, the Chinese government required telecommunications carriers including China Mobile, China Unicom, and China Telecom to block individual access to VPNs by February 1. In August 2017, more than 60 VPNs, such as Astrill and Express VPN, were removed from China's App Store. VPNs that are allowed to be used in China must be approved by state regulators and use the state network infrastructure. Instead of sensitive words which can be censored online, Chinese netizens use puns and Chinese homophones to communicate.

==== Sex and pornography on the Internet ====
The Chinese government has been denouncing sex and pornography culture and actively establishes "sex education" for teenagers and high school students in order to prevent them from developing an interest in this culture. As of 2012, the most frequent way Chinese people were accessing otherwise banned sexual material was through the Internet. According to a 2012 article, the number of sex-related pages was increasing at the time. As of 2010, China's Ministry of Public Security had collected intelligence agents from student groups to spy on people's Internet activities. When government efforts at porn censorship and surveillance heightened in 2010, instances of erotic activism also emerged online. As of 2012, movies, books, comics, and videos involving sexually sensitive or provocative material were typically banned on the Chinese Internet. Web administrators have been seeking sexual information online to remove it as soon as they find it or otherwise censor it.

As of 2018, there have been sections in China's criminal law which explicitly forbid the production, dissemination, or sale of obscene material, for which people can be imprisoned. In the 1980s, there was a campaign against "spiritual pollution", referring to sex-related content. In 2018, a Chinese erotic writer who wrote and sold a gay porn novel named Occupy online was sentenced to a ten-and-a-half-year prison sentence. As of 2019, conservative attitudes toward sex talk have remained standard amongst the general public.

=== Surveillance cameras ===
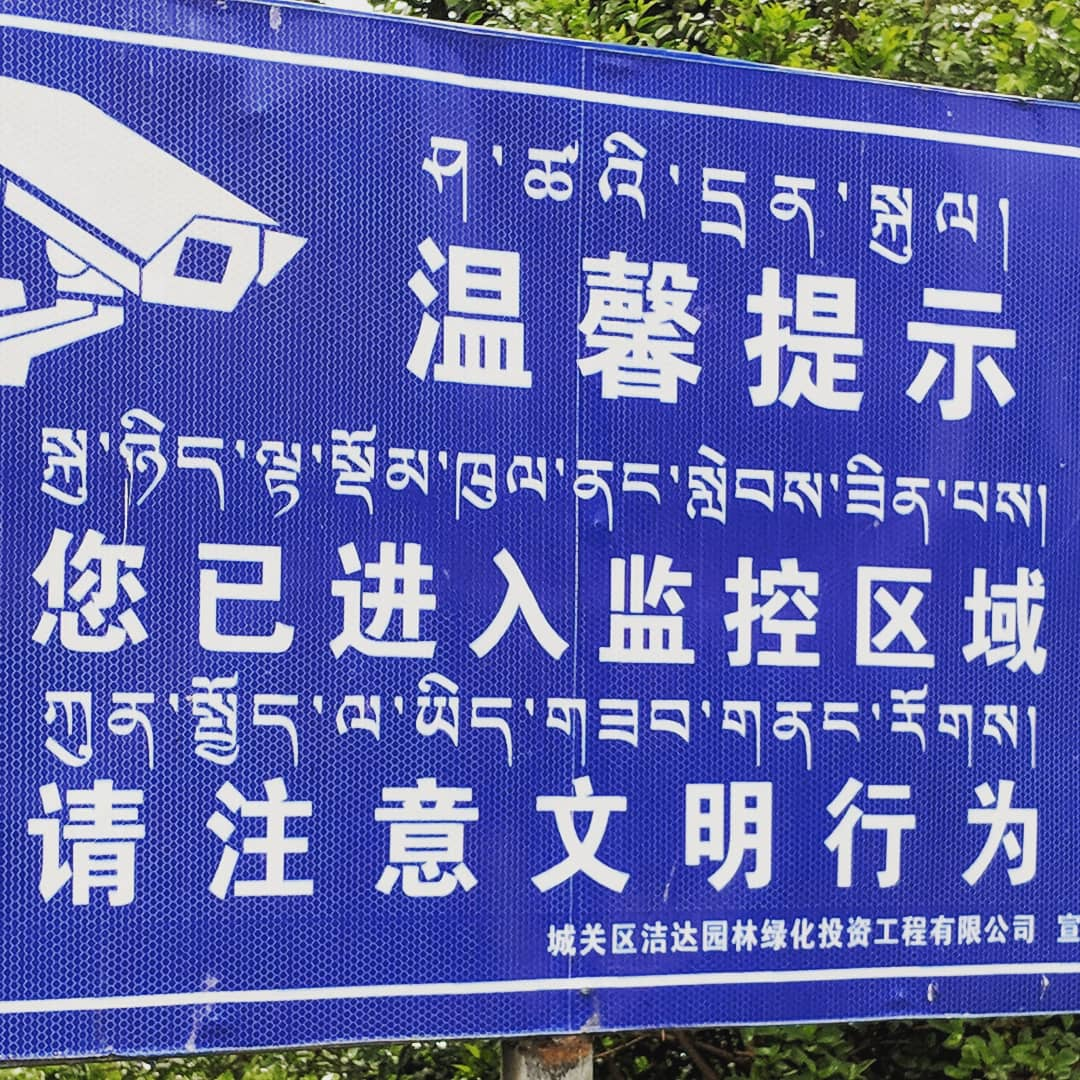
A camera monitoring warning sign near the Monument to the Peaceful Liberation of Tibet, Lhasa, Tibet, 2018

By 2018, the Chinese government had installed close to 200 million surveillance cameras across the country, which amounts to approximately one camera per seven citizens. At the same time, approximately 40 million surveillance cameras were active in the United States in 2014, which amounts to approximately one camera per eight citizens; however, these are largely installed by homeowners and stores rather than the government. According to official statistics in 2012, more than 660 of the mainland's 676 cities use surveillance systems. In Guangdong province, 1.1 million cameras were installed in 2012, with plans to increase the number to two million by 2015 at a predicted cost of 12.3 billion yuan. By 2020, the Chinese government expects to integrate private and public cameras, leveraging the country's technological expertise in facial recognition technology to build a nationwide surveillance network.

The facial recognition technology has technological and systematic limitations. For example, a supervisor at an AI firm that provides research support for this technology has stated that the system of activity profile can only look for a maximum of a thousand people in one search. Additionally, the system cannot work continuously for long periods of time, requiring reactivation in cases of extreme need.

The National Information Security Standardization Technical Committee (全国信标委生物特征识别分技术委), which is subordinate to the China Communications Standards Association, started a project in November 2019 to create mandatory standards for facial recognition in China. The project is led by SenseTime and has been assigned to a working group comprising 27 Chinese companies. Also Chinese companies are working to shape the United Nations' standards for facial recognition, and video surveillance of cities and vehicles, with ZTE, Dahua Technology, China Telecom and others proposing standards to the International Telecommunication Union (ITU).

In 2025, China's national law enforcement agency issued rules establishing oversight standards for public video surveillance systems. Under the rules, system operators are required to register surveillance systems with the local law enforcement agency.

=== Other digital technologies ===
China has highly advanced facial recognition technology. The technology is integrated with others, such as big data and AI, to build a national surveillance and data sharing platform. The smart system is equipped with facial recognition technology to record jaywalkers and non-motor vehicles that break traffic rules. When shopping in the self-service markets of Alibaba and Jingdong, two top Chinese e-commerce companies, customers can use electronic payments through the facial recognition system, which links them with their bank cards. Moreover, Baidu, a Chinese multinational technology company, cooperated with China Southern Airlines to install the facial recognition technology in Nanyang Jiangying Airport, Henan, for boarding.

Robot police have been installed in public places such as train stations, museums, and tourist attractions.

Furthermore, the Chinese government uses big data technology in order to analyze and monitor people's online behavior, such as Sesame Credit, which ranks its users based on their online activities along with its previously mentioned functions.

In May 2026, media outlets reported on China's latest effort to integrate facial recognition, travel records, visa information, hotel registrations, and telecommunications data to monitor foreign nationals in near real time. The system is called "Dynamic Control Platform for Foreigners." The media reports expressed concerns about the Chinese authorities' expansion of AI-assisted surveillance.

== Mainland China ==
=== Social credit system ===
The social credit system (Chinese: 社会信用体系; pinyin: shèhuì xìnyòng tǐxì) is a national credit rating and blacklist implemented by the government of the People's Republic of China. The social credit system is a broad governance strategy to track businesses, individuals, and government institutions and enhance their perceived trustworthiness rather than a single system. It is based on varying degrees of whitelisting (termed "redlisting" in China) and blacklisting. There have been widespread misconceptions in media reports about a unified social credit "score" based on individuals' behavior, leading to punishments if the score is too low or rewards if the score is high.

=== Smart cities ===
Smart cities began rolling out in 2003 and China is host to hundreds of smart city pilot programs aiming to measure, track and analyze data from every aspect of city life including air quality, traffic flow, congestion and waste water disposal. A key component of smart cities includes the installation of public security cameras in order to more effectively deter crime and anti-social behavior, however, critics have stated the projects are also used as a form of social control in order to target dissidents and crack down on any potential unrest.

=== Skynet ===
Skynet is an interlinked system of facial recognition software enabled surveillance cameras currently in operation in 16 Chinese provinces used to help public security organs crack down on crime and identify citizens in public through cross reference with criminal and national identity databases held by the Ministry of Public Security and the National Citizen Identity Information Center (NCIIC). According to CCP-owned tabloid Global Times, the system is fast enough to scan the entire population of the People's Republic of China in under a second and allegedly has an accuracy rate of 99.8%.

=== Police cloud ===
In 2020, reporting by Human Rights Watch indicated that public security bureaus (PSB's) across the country began implementing "Police Cloud" systems in order to aggregate data from healthcare, social media activity and Internet browsing activity, reportedly to track and predict the activities of activists, dissidents, and ethnic minorities, including those alleged to be in possession of "extreme thoughts". The Central Political and Legal Affairs Commission plans to construct a network of police clouds in every provincial and municipal public security bureau, eventually interlinking them together in one unified national police cloud system.

The police cloud system aims to integrate information from all available sources to public security bureaus, including but not limited to residential addresses, family relations, birth control information, religious affiliations, hotel, flight records, train records, biometrics, CCTV footage, mail delivery information and information shared across from other government departments. Reporting by Human Rights Watch also revealed PSB's also intended to purchase data such as navigation data on the Internet (browsing histories) and the logistical purchase and transaction records of major e-commerce companies from third party brokers in order to more effectively predict crime while cracking down and targeting any potential dissent.

=== Sharp eyes project ===
Sharp Eyes (Chinese: 雪亮工程; pinyin: xuě liàng gōngchéng) is a project which aimed to surveil one hundred percent of public space using surveillance in China by 2020, according to the 13th Five Year Plan released in 2016. Although it is questionable whether such targets outlined in the plan have been achieved, the 14th Five Year Plan continues with the project, instructing public security organs to: "closely guard against, and crack down on, the infiltration, sabotage, subversion and separatist activities by hostile forces".

=== Digital RMB ===
Digital RMB or digital Yuan is a centralized digital currency issued by the People's Bank of China (PBOC) in order to facilitate transactions as a supplement of a physical national currency, however, the government does not plan on replacing cash or other mobile payment apps with digital renminbi. As of 2021, the project was still in the pilot stage rolling out across select Chinese cities. Businesses will continue to be obligated to accept cash, and may be fined for refusing to accept cash.

=== Public records ===
The public records or Dang'an (simplified Chinese: 档案; traditional Chinese: 檔案; pinyin: dàng'àn) literally: "archived record/file" is a permanent dossier or archival system that records the "performance and attitudes" of citizens of mainland China. Together with the current system of household registration, the Hukou system, it has been an important mechanism of social control. The contents of the file include physical characteristics, employment records, photographs, appraisals by supervisors and peers, academic reports from primary school to university, professional credentials, criminal convictions or administrative penalties, club/society memberships, employment records and political history such as membership in the Communist Youth League and or party membership. If an individual is a party member, the file will also include membership assessments of political integrity and performance of duties. Death certificate and eulogy may also be placed in the file. In 2001, a human rights group claimed the state public security bureaus located throughout the country were in the process of digitizing hundreds of millions of dang'an. The dang'an system is the precursor or foundation of the social credit system in that data stored within dossiers are pulled into a broader pool of data and amalgamated together with data pulled from other sources in order to provide a more complete picture of an individual's movements, actions and life.

=== Resident Identity Card ===
All Chinese citizens are required to hold a national identity card from the age of 16. The resident ID card (Chinese: 居民身份证; pinyin: Jūmín shēnfèn zhèng) acts as a national ID card and contains basic identifying information such as photograph, residential address, gender, ethnicity, date of birth and fingerprints of both thumbs embedded on an IC chip. Card information is stored within the National Population Basic Information Database (Chinese: 全国人口基本信息数据库; pinyin: Quánguó rénkǒu jīběn xìnxī shùjùkù) administered by the Ministry of Public Security, Ministry of Civil Affairs and the Ministry of Human Resources and Social Security. The resident ID card acts as the primary form of identification for citizens within China and is required for almost all basic government services and administrative tasks in everyday life. In March 2022, Chinese Premier Li Keqiang stated that the government was planning the rollout of digital national ID cards with national rollout scheduled for an unspecified date.

=== Household registration ===
Household registration or Hukou (Chinese: 户口; pinyin: Hùkǒu) has been in existence since the establishment of the People's Republic of China in 1949 and since imperial times. The "Hukou" or family registration system lists the members of an individual's immediate family and any extended relatives who may be connected to the individual in addition to births, deaths, marriages, divorces and relocations and other movements.

Hukou is divided into either agricultural or urban status and acts as a form of social control by restricting the area in which an individual and his or her children can obtain access to education, healthcare, housing, employment and or other government services. The system also acts as a convenient method for the state to exert collective punishment, i.e., individuals who commit or engage in acts of dissent may have their families arrested or detained for leverage.

In recent years Hukou information has been utilized extensively to suppress dissent both at home and abroad in Xi Jinping's anti-corruption campaign, specifically Operation Fox Hunt in which suspects accused of corruption in China are coerced into returning home to face charges for fear of consequences which may befall their family and or extended relatives residing in the country. The Ministry of Public Security manages the National Basic Population Information Database (NBPIB) as part of the Golden Shield Project, which contains digitized Hukou information in addition to information on past travels and criminal history. The database contains information on 96% of the Chinese population.

Household registration is governed by the "Regulations of the People's Republic of China on Household Registration" issued in 1958, which states:

Article 2: All citizens of the People's Republic of China shall perform household registration.

Article 3 The household registration work shall be in charge of the public security organs at all levels.

Cities and towns with public security police stations shall be under the jurisdiction of public security police stations; townships and towns without public security stations shall be under the jurisdiction of townships and towns. The township and township people's committees and police stations are the household registration authorities.

— Regulations of the People's Republic of China on Household Registration (1958), Chapter I.

=== Residency registration ===
In accordance with the Entry and Exit Administration Law of the People's Republic of China, all persons entering the country or upon moving to each new region within China must register their residency by obtaining a temporary residence permit at the nearest Public Security Bureau or PSB within 24 hours of arrival. Failure to do so may result in fines of up to 2,000 RMB or detention.

Hotels hosting the stay of foreigners or non-PRC nationals are obligated to report and upload information to platforms stipulated by the PSB's in each respective area. The regulation is reminiscent of former Soviet practice in that it is designed to closely surveil all foreign nationals in the event they may be potential spies who pose a risk to national security in addition to being able to quickly respond or detain anyone who may be in violation of laws or disrupt public order.

=== Grid-based social management ===
On July 11, 2020, state media outlet Xinhua announced that local party committees and officials including neighborhood management committees would be empowered to engage in law enforcement activities and hand out administrative punishments of residents within their perimeters. According to a high-level opinion document: "[Officials at] township, village and neighbourhood [level] shall be given administrative law enforcement powers...while existing law enforcement powers and resources shall be integrated".

According to directives sent out in 2018, the grid system carves up city neighborhoods into a grid pattern containing 15-20 households per square, with each grid appointed a designated monitor who reports back on residents' affairs to local party committees. According to reporting by RFA the task of a "grid monitor" for a neighborhood committee is to: "fully understand the residents of their grid, including exactly who lives where, which organizations they belong to, and the sort of lives they lead".

The devolvement of law enforcement powers down to the county and village levels has been described as "unprecedented" with the potential to lead to "major turmoil" and social unrest due to the fact village and local party cadres lack the ability or necessary legal knowledge to enforce laws.

=== Real name registration ===
Since all citizens of China are required to carry a national ID card, the resident ID card is the only acceptable form of government-issued identification for a variety of services including the purchase of SIM cards, plane tickets, high-speed train tickets, banking, financial services, education and healthcare. Further, real name registration is mandatory for Internet access in China and as of December 2019, the Ministry of Industry and Information Technology required that all individuals wishing to purchase SIM cards in China submit to facial recognition scans in order to tie mobile phone numbers, text messaging and Internet browsing activity to real name identities.

The Cybersecurity Law of the People's Republic of China passed in 2017 by the Standing Committee of the National People's Congress (NPCSC) mandates that providers of instant messaging services, telecommunications and Internet service providers companies as well as domain name registration providers verify the real ID of users prior to provision of service.

Article 24: Network operators handling network access and domain name registration services for users, handling stationary or mobile phone network access, or providing users with information publication or instant messaging services, shall require users to provide real identity information when signing agreements with users or confirming the provision of services. Where users do not provide real identity information, network operators must not provide them with relevant services.

— Cybersecurity Law of the People's Republic of China (2017), Chapter III.

=== Internet Security Regulations in China ===
State Council Order No. 33 (1997, revised 2011) "Measures for the Administration of Security Protection of Computer Information Networks with International Interconnections" mandates that providers of internet access (i.e., hotels, restaurants, airports, and shopping centers, internet cafes or any other enterprise which provides internet connectivity) must register users, review content, retain original records of prohibited material, and report suspicious activity to public security authorities within 24 hours.

Later, the Ministry of Public Security issued Order No. 82 (2006): "Provisions on the Technical Measures for the Protection of the Security of the Internet" requiring internet service providers to maintain detailed user activity logs—such as login times, account details, and URLs—for at least 60 days, and submit to public security supervision of technical security measures.

Under above regulations, providers of internet access - must enforce real-name verification for users accessing the internet. Users are required to provide identification through government-issued ID cards, passports, or other official documents. Alternatively, verification via mobile phone numbers, which are linked to real-name registration due to mandatory SIM card registration, is also permitted.

Businesses are required to maintain detailed logs of user activities and ensure systems for network security monitoring and reporting are in place. The goal of these measures is to enhance cybersecurity and allow authorities to monitor and mitigate illegal online activities. However, these requirements have raised concerns regarding privacy and the balance between security and individual freedoms.

==== Internet browsing history ====
As a result of the passage of the cybersecurity law, network operators (widely believed to refer to Internet service providers) are required to maintain unspecified "network logs" for at least 6 months. Although the exact definition of what constitutes network logs remains unclear, it has been interpreted by Jones Day and other international law firms to refer to weblogs or Internet browsing history.

=== Voice identification ===
In 2017, Human Rights Watch reported the Chinese government had collected tens of thousands of voice samples, for use with iFlytek technology that identifies individuals by voice on phone calls or in public places.

=== National Citizen Identity Information Centre (NCIIC) ===
In 2007, the state-run China Internet Information Center reported that the world's largest ID database hosting over 1.3 billion entries was complete. NCIIC or the National Citizen Identity Information Center is located in Beijing and is the backbone of the National ID card system used throughout China by banking, financial services, healthcare, education and various government agencies, the law enforcement apparatus, Internet service providers and social media platforms to verify the real ID information of users and customers who wish to use their services.

=== Biometrics Collection and Entry and Exit Administration Law of the People's Republic of China ===
From February 8, 2021, Chinese embassies started requiring the submission of biometrics including photographs and the fingerprints from all 10 fingers as a pre-requisite for visa applications.

Since February 2017, the Ministry of Public Security, in conjunction with its child agency China Immigration Inspection (CII), has required all foreign nationals entering the People's Republic of China to submit biometric information, including an in-person facial scan and as well as fingerprints from all 10 fingers as a national security measure.

The Legislative basis is provided by Article 7 of the Entry and Exit Administration Law of the People's Republic of China and since implementation, the scheme has already resulted in the cancellation of some covert dual citizenship holders attempting to obtain or renew Chinese passports (Chinese nationality law does not allow for dual citizenship).

Article 7: Upon approval by the State Council, the Ministry of Public Security and the Ministry of Foreign Affairs may, on the basis of the need for exit/entry administration, set forth regulations on the collection and keep of fingerprints and other biometric identification information of the persons who exit or enter China.

— Entry and Exit Administration Law of the People's Republic of China (2013), Chapter I.

=== Facial recognition scanners and security checks in subway stations ===
Following an attack at the Kunming railway station in Southern China, the Chinese government began mandating security screening prior to entrance at metro and train stations across China. In 2021, four subway stations in Guangzhou began in the southern city of Guangzhou began allowing people to use a biometric security gate instead of going through a security check by station staff. In 2019, the South China Morning Post reported that the Beijing Subway would also begin sorting passengers using facial recognition based on information pulled from the social credit system and criminal offending databases. Commuters who exhibited anti-social behavior or had previous bad credit scores would also be penalized under the system.

=== National Anti-Fraud Center App ===
In April 2021, it was reported that the citizens were being forced to install an application developed by the National Anti-Fraud Center of the Ministry of Public Security, ostensibly for the purposes of preventing telecommunications fraud and overseas scams. Users of the app are required to enter their names and national ID numbers and submit facial scans when registering for the app; causing much controversy over privacy implications and concerns of device-based surveillance and censorship. In September, it was reported that public security officials were using the application to track and question individuals who had accessed overseas financial news containing negative coverage of the Chinese economy.

== Tibet and Xinjiang ==
In mainland China, one of the most important ongoing projects is a Skynet project with an installation of more than 200 million video surveillance cameras. The real-time pedestrian tracking and recognition system can precisely identify people's clothing, gender, and age, as well as both motor and non-motor vehicles. Additionally, the surveillance system can instantly match a person's image with their personal identification and information. Golden Shield is a giant mechanism of censorship and surveillance that blocks tens of thousands of websites that may present negative reports about the CCP's narrative and control.

=== Tibet ===
The Chinese government sent groups of cadres to Tibetan villages as part of the Benefit the Masses campaign in 2012. The purpose of the campaign was to improve service and living quality in Tibet and to educate the locals about the importance of social stability and adherence to the CCP. The local people were also supervised in order to prevent uprisings from taking place.

In Tibet and the rest of mainland China, all Internet and mobile phone users are legally required to register under their real names. The government reported that the program had reached full realization in June 2013, with 2.76 million mobile phone users and 1.47 million Internet users having registered under their real identities. Nyima Doje, an official, stated that "the real-name registration is conducive to protecting citizens' personal information and curbing the spread of detrimental information".

In 2018, during the Saga Dawa, the holy fourth month for Tibetan Buddhists, the government enforced stricter rules in Lhasa, according to the Global Times. People were also discouraged from engaging in religious practices in this month. When they did, they were supervised closely.

As a method of protesting, some Tibetans have engaged in immolation, which is a tradition of protest against Chinese control that was first practiced in the mid-20th century.

=== Xinjiang ===
In Xinjiang and especially its capital city, Ürümqi, there are security checkpoints and identification stations almost everywhere. The Uyghurs are among those that fall under the "focus personnel" category and is subjected to intense surveillance. People need to show their ID cards and have their faces scanned by cameras at a security station before entering a supermarket, a hotel, a train station, a highway station, or other public place. The ratio of police officers stationed in Xinjiang to the Xinjiang population is higher than elsewhere. This strict enforcement of security checks is partly a response to the separatist movement in 2009 associated with Uyghurs. Additionally, the cameras on streets are denser there than elsewhere, numbering 40,000. The information collected by the cameras is matched with individual profiles, which include previously collected biometric data, such as DNA samples and voice samples. People are rated on a level of trustworthiness based on their profiles, which also takes into account their familial relations and social connections. These levels include "trustworthy", "average", and "untrustworthy". The data is fed into the Integrated Joint Operations Platform (Chinese: 一体化联合作战平台), an AI-powered system used for mass surveillance which generates lists of suspects for detention.

Xinjiang residents, especially those from the Uyghur ethnic group, are not allowed to practice certain religious acts. They are also more actively and strictly monitored by surveillance apps, voice printing, and facial recognition cameras. Since 2017, the government has set up re-education camps in Xinjiang to force citizens into compliance. People in the camps are usually closely watched by guards and are not allowed to contact others outside the facilities, including family members and other close relations. They learn about Mandarin Chinese characters and the rules that they need to follow in those camps as well as outside once they leave.

The security spending in Xinjiang ballooned in 2017, witnessing an increase of 90% to $8.52 billion as compared to that in 2016. Since at least 2017, Chinese police have forced Uyghurs in Xinjiang to install the Jingwang Weishi app on their phones, allowing for remote monitoring of the phones' contents.

That same year, Chinese drone manufacturer DJI signed a cooperation agreement with local police to provide surveillance drones in support of their operations. In 2018, China deployed a flock of drones disguised to look like birds to step up surveillance levels in the region.

The Integrated Joint Operations Platform (IJOP, 一体化联合作战平台), used by the government to monitor the population, particularly Uyghurs, was reported by The Washington Post and Human Rights Watch (HRW) in 2018. The platform gathers biometrics, including DNA samples, to track individuals in Xinjiang.

In November 2019, the International Consortium of Investigative Journalists published the China Cables, consisting of six documents, an "operations manual" for running the camps and detailed use of predictive policing and AI to target people and regulate life inside the camps.

In late 2020, HRW obtained a list of 2000 names of Uyghur prisoners held in the Aksu prefecture leaked from IJOP. The list showed that reasons for imprisonment included religious practice such as studying the Koran without state permission or having a long beard, using software or online services such as a VPN, travelling outside of Aksu, switching off one's phone repeatedly, or having "extremist thoughts". The leaked IJOP list provided detailed, day-to-day evidence on the workings of the Xinjiang re-education camps that The Guardian described as "unprecedented". An earlier list, the Karakax (or Qaraqash) list, leaked in February 2020, showed decision-making about retaining or releasing detainees.

In 2023, IPVM found that all foreign journalists traveling to Xinjiang are tracked via Alibaba's police cloud. Visitors to the region are also reportedly forced to install an application named BXAQ at key border and entry checkpoints, which: "acts like malware" and siphons off call, text, files, browsing data and other device information off to servers controlled by public security authorities. A 2025 Associated Press investigation reported that Chinese authorities use digital policing systems that aggregate large amounts of personal data to monitor residents in Xinjiang. The systems were built in part using technology supplied by U.S.-based companies.

== Hong Kong ==
Hong Kong's Umbrella Movement, a pro-democracy campaign, aims to demand full democracy so that Hong Kong's citizens can have the right to nominate and elect the head of the Hong Kong government. However, key pro-democracy figures, such as some lawmakers, academics, and political activists, are under the central government's surveillance. Some activists engaged in the umbrella movement have been intimidated or arrested by policemen. News reports, social media posts, and images about Hong Kong's pro-democracy protests are censored in mainland China.

Internet users and civil society groups in Hong Kong have been facing cyber-attacks and debated threats to privacy online during the past few years. In June 2014, a white paper on the "one country, two systems" agreement issued by Beijing articulated that the central government has comprehensive jurisdiction over Hong Kong and that the power to run local affairs is authorized by the central government.

=== Hong Kong Identity Card ===
Like in mainland China, all residents of Hong Kong are required to hold an IC or identity card, known as the Hong Kong Identity Card or HKID issued by the immigration department in accordance with the Registration of Persons Ordinance (Cap. 177) stating that: "all residents of age 11 or above who are living in Hong Kong for longer than 180 days must, within 30 days of either reaching the age of 11 or arriving in Hong Kong, register for an HKID".

In addition to containing standard biographical information such as name, age and sex, the card contains a chip which contains the fingerprint scans of two thumbprints of the holder.

National ID's are a characteristic of surveillance states in that the ID is part of the "daily papers" individuals are required to carry on them at all times in order to access government, banking or other financial and social services. Holders of HKID's can pass through customs checkpoints faster at ports of entry throughout the city by scanning their fingerprints when entering.

=== National Security Law ===
Since the passage of the 2020 Hong Kong national security law, or 'Law on Safeguarding National Security in the Hong Kong Special Administrative Region', Hong Kong has been the target of creeping authoritarianism from the mainland Chinese government through a variety of methods including stacking the legislative council with pro-Beijing candidates, arrest of opposition leaders and disqualification of candidates of the legislative council considered insufficiently "patriotic". The law also created the Office for Safeguarding National Security otherwise known as the "Central People's Government National Security Office" (CPGNSO), an agency which allows mainland law enforcement officers and agents to operate on Hong Kong jurisdiction without permission from Hong Kong police or the HKSAR government.

On November 11, 2020, the National People's Congress Standing Committee (NPCSC) adopted a decision disqualifying Hong Kong legislators who "publicize or support independence", "seek foreign interference", or pursue "other activities that endanger national security". The "reforms" as referred to by Beijing, paved the way for the insertion of loyalists and subsequent proposal and passage of series of laws considered authoritarian including on patriotic education, sim card registration and laws preventing the doxing of police officers of the HKPF.

=== Anti-Doxing Law ===
On July 21, 2021, the Hong Kong Legislative Council began talks to implement "anti-doxing" laws in response to the 2019-pro democracy protests in which members of the Hong Kong Police Force and certain judges were doxed or had their personal information such as names, addresses, names of family members, details of children and schools attended leaked to the public in retribution for violence or police brutality encountered during the course of the protests. Critics of the legislation, including human rights and tech industry groups stated that the measures could be used to protect those in power and target civil society. Under the proposed laws, violators could face fines of up to HK$1 million ($128,736) and five years in prison.

The law also empowers the Office of the Privacy Commissioner for Personal Data to access electronic devices without warrant. In response Asia Internet Coalition an advocacy group consisting of Google, Facebook and Twitter, warned in a June 25 letter to the commissioner that tech companies could stop offering their services in Hong Kong if changes were enacted since "the measures were "not aligned with global norms and trends", and that any legislation that could curb freedom of speech "must be built upon principles of necessity and proportionality".

=== SIM Card Registration (Telecommunications Ordinance Amendment) ===
On June 2, 2021, the cabinet body of Hong Kong known as the Executive Council or "ExCo" announced from March 2022, that all purchasers of SIM cards would be required to provide their identity card number, date of birth, and a copy of their identification document when purchasing a SIM Card in Hong Kong. Edward Yau, the Secretary of Commerce and Economic Development described the amendment as an: "overdue move to fight crime". Yau also claimed that among the 100,000 submissions received during consultation, 70 percent supported the arrangements.

According to the details of the legislation, from September 1, operators will be given 180 days to implement a system to store customers' registration details and from March 1, 2022, users would be given 360 days to register any pre-paid sim cards already in circulation. Under new arrangements, law enforcement agencies will be allowed access to information without a warrant in vaguely defined: "urgent and exceptional circumstances".

The move coincided closely with the passage of the national security law and reflects parallel arrangements in mainland China where users are also required to register new SIM cards using real name identification. The move marks increasing efforts by the CCP to assert its control over Hong Kong through increased surveillance and the intrusion of digital authoritarianism.

Dan McDevitt, manager of website Greatfire.org wrote on Nikkei Asia in response to the new regulations that Beijing had "brought its repressive surveillance tools to Hong Kong", gradually tightening control over the Internet and eroding the privacy, forums for open communication and civil society post enactment of the national security law. Anyone found guilty of faking registration details under the ordinance liable to be jailed for 14 years.

=== Suspension of data requests from Hong Kong police ===
On July 6, 2020, social media companies such as Facebook, Google and Twitter suspended processing requests for user data from Hong Kong Law Enforcement agencies out of fear the data could be used to engage suppression of political dissent and targeting of peaceful participants of the protests, owing to the overly broad interpretations of the law in respect to definitions of the incitement of "subversion, collusion, espionage" and "secession". In response to the enactment of the law, TikTok also stated that it would exit the Hong Kong market in the days following the promulgation of the national security law.

=== Facial recognition checkpoints at ports of entry ===
Since 2017, China Immigration Inspection and the Ministry of Public Security has required submission of biometrics before entering the territory of the People's Republic of China. Fingerprints from all 10 fingers and a photograph of a person's face is also required when crossing into mainland China from any immigration control points.

Over the years China has been building a large facial recognition databases for the purposes of targeting and suppressing dissent in addition to enhancing border control through the placement of entry and exit bans on corruption suspects, dissidents and targets of criminal investigations or persons of interest to the ruling CCP.

Residents of Hong Kong have expressed fear of being unable to leave upon entering mainland China and since the anti-extradition bill and pro democracy protests of 2019, certain residents suspected of involvement in political activism and protests have been blacklisted and barred from entry into mainland China.

Since 2018, HKIA (Hong Kong International Airport) has also operated facial recognition and biometric smart-gates to assist passengers to pass through security and clear customs faster. Hong Kong residents are eligible for accelerated entry into Hong Kong by scanning their fingerprints and ID cards when entering Hong Kong. The machine works by cross matching information contained on the card-chip to that of the holder in order to verify the identity of the holder.

=== Public security cameras ===
As of 2014, Hong Kong is home to some 50,000 security cameras, with some 20,000 operated by the Housing Authority of Hong Kong, according to reports by South China Morning Post. In January 2024, the Hong Kong Free Press reported that the city planned to install 2,000 more cameras, with officials citing that current numbers were "relatively small". Security Bureau officials claimed that the government did not maintain statistics on the cumulative number of security cameras throughout the city utilized by different departments. Chief Executive of Hong Kong John Lee also did not respond to whether cameras utilized facial recognition technology; stating: "disclosing detailed information of the systems may reveal to criminals relevant government departments’ security arrangements, as well as the capabilities and investigatory techniques of law enforcement agencies."

In February 2024, South China Morning Post reported that Raymond Siu, Commissioner of the Hong Kong Police supported plans to install a further 2,000 surveillance cameras throughout the city in densely populated and "high crime" areas to ensure resident safety. Amidst privacy concerns, Siu defended the plans, stating such measures were "common sense" and that other jurisdictions such as Singapore and the UK had already employed such technologies, again adding that the police force would not rule out the possibility of using facial recognition in the surveillance system in the future.

==== Smart Lamposts ====
Since 2019 city administration officials also began installing "smart lampposts" with CCTV technology to monitor traffic flow and congestion.

==== Installation of Cameras in Classrooms ====
In March 2020, pro-Beijing legislators of the Hong Kong Legislative Council suggested that cameras be installed in classrooms in order to monitor the contents of lectures being delivered to students in addition to monitoring the teachers themselves.

==== SmartView ====
The SmartView project launched in April 2024, and is still expanding.

=== Information sharing with mainland China ===
In September 2019, Hong Kong Free Press reported that the Hong Kong Police Force's Intelligence Division had installed a private line connecting police headquarters to the criminal division of an intermediate people's court in Shenzhen. Tendering documents obtained by the paper described the line as a "gigabyte passive optical network” which would hide activities from regular network users, making it "more immune to message interception".

Police stated that the line was "temporarily installed for a criminal based in China to provide evidence remotely on a drug trafficking case" and that the line would be removed at the conclusion of the case. Democratic Party lawmaker James To stated that a direct line between police headquarters and a mainland court was definitely "not normal" and "unusual" with the officially established point of contact with mainland Chinese law enforcement and judicial authorities being the Police Liaison Department of the Liaison Office of the Central People's Government in the HKSAR.

=== Application of Chinese law within Hong Kong ===
==== West Kowloon Station ====
In June 2021, the Hong Kong Court of Appeal upheld the constitutional status of a controversial arrangement to allow the application of mainland Chinese law of the West Kowloon Terminus of the cross-border high speed rail way between the Special Administrative Region of Hong Kong and the territory of the People's Republic of China (mainland China).

The plan would mean that mainland law enforcement officials from MPS or the Ministry of Public Security and the Shenzhen Municipal Public Security Bureau would be able to enforce Chinese law inside the station and potentially arrest any dissidents of the ruling CCP when they cross over into mainland China at the checkpoint.

Critics described the arrangement as infringing upon Hong Kong's autonomy and being in violation of the Hong Kong Basic Law. Since 2007, a similar arrangement has operated at the border where Hong Kong jurisdiction overlaps with areas of the Shenzhen Bay Port on the mainland.

Earlier in 2019, Simon Cheng an investment officer at the British Consulate General in Hong Kong was arrested by public security officers at the station after returning from a business trip in Shenzhen for allegedly soliciting prostitution. Cheng was a vocal activist and supporter of the 2019 pro-democracy protests in Hong Kong.

==== Hong Kong-Zhuhai Macau Bridge ====
On December 15, 2019, the Hong Kong Immigration department received reports that a man had apparently disappeared while crossing the Hong Kong-Zhuhai Macau Bridge to Macau.

The bridge, since constructed in 2018 had hosted a Chinese police checkpoint staffed by officers from the mainland China Immigration Inspection agency of the Ministry of Public Security. Upon further investigation it was revealed the man had been detained by Chinese police while on his way to Macau on the Zhuhai-Macau Port Artificial Island (a section of the bridge mid-way leading into an underwater tunnel).

Reports by the Hong Kong Free Press revealed that officers from Guangdong Public Security Bureau had set up a checkpoint consisting of X-ray machines and facial recognition scanners ahead of an up-coming visit to Macau by CCP general secretary Xi Jinping, which had picked up the man as he crossed the checkpoint into Macau. Since the bridge was built by the central government, Beijing exercises jurisdictional authority over it, on the basis that the Zhuhai-Macau Port Artificial Island is part of Chinese territory.

This expansive interpretation of what is considered Chinese territory reflects increasing efforts under CCP general secretary Xi Jinping's administration to increase Chinese soft power while enhancing the extraterritorial reach of its laws through actions such as the stationing of security agents outside of territories where they normally operate.

== Taiwan ==
The "SkyNet" technology used by the Chinese government to monitor the population through pervasive cameras covers everyone appearing under the camera network, while it does not affect Taiwan. Meanwhile, Taiwanese officials have informed Taiwanese people living in mainland China about the increasing prevalence of surveillance on their activities. This has become a heightened concern since China started offering residence cards and a full national status to people from Taiwan, Hong Kong, and Macau who were living in the mainland. As a result of Beijing's initiative, individuals such as students and workers can apply for a residence permit after residing in mainland China for six months. This policy extends social services and medical benefits to them, who now enjoy those services in the same way as other Chinese citizens. Taiwanese authorities are worried about surveillance on the Taiwanese because of the residence cards issued to them, which provide their identities to the Chinese government and subject them to the same surveillance regime composed of cameras, facial recognition technology, and social credit.

== Spending estimates ==
In 2010, domestic security expenditure exceeded spending on external defense for the first time. By 2016, domestic security spending surpassed external defense by 13%.

In 2017, China's spending on domestic security was estimated to be US$197 billion, excluding spending on security-related urban management and surveillance technology initiatives. In the same year, the central government's total public security spending in Xinjiang reached 57.95 billion RMB, the equivalent of US$9.16 billion, which is ten times the spending of the previous decade.

In 2018, China spent the equivalent of US$20 billion purchasing closed-circuit television cameras and other surveillance equipment. This large number of purchases reaches half the size of the global market's, according to an estimate reported in a state newspaper.

== See also ==
- 50 Cent Party – Chinese government employees making online posts
- Chinese intelligence activity abroad
- Digital Authoritarianism – Method of authoritarianism
- Disease surveillance in China – Main public health surveillance activity in China
- Facial recognition system – Technology capable of matching a face from an image against a database of faces
- Great Firewall – Chinese internet regulations
- Human flesh search engine – Chinese term for a form of Internet vigilantism
