= Hikvision =

Chinese video surveillance equipment company

Hangzhou Hikvision Digital Technology Co., Ltd.

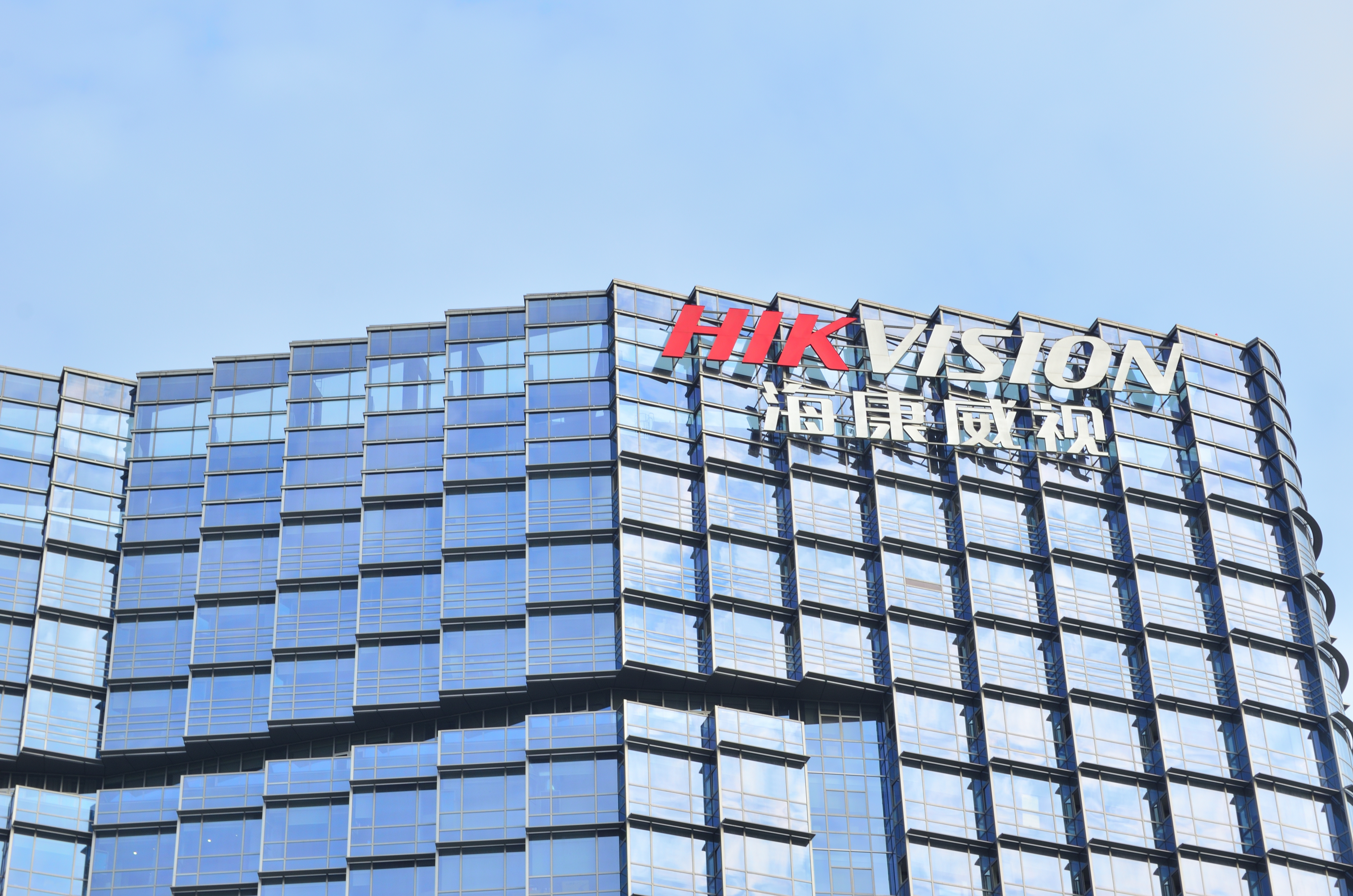
- Hikvision headquarters in Hangzhou, Zhejiang
- Type: Public; partly state-owned
- Traded as: SZSE: 002415; CSI A100
- Industry: Video surveillance Manufacturing
- Founded: 2001; 25 years ago
- Founder: HIK Information Technology; Gong Hongjia
- Headquarters: Binjiang, Hangzhou, Zhejiang, China
- Area served: Worldwide
Key people
Gong Hongjia	(vice-chairman)
Chen Zongnian	(chairman)
Hu Yangzhong	(director)
- Products: CCTV and network surveillance systems
- Brands: Hiksemi (HikStorage), Ezviz, Hilook, Hiwatch
Owner
Chinese Central Government (via China Electronics Technology HIK Group Co., Ltd.)	(38.88%)
Gong Hongjia	(10.30%)
Xinjiang Weixun Investment Management Limited Partnership	(4.82%)
- Number of employees: 42,685 (2021)
Parent
CET HIK Group	(direct)
China Electronics Technology Group	(indirect)
SASAC	(ultimate)

Chinese name
- Simplified Chinese: 杭州海康威视数字技术股份有限公司
- Traditional Chinese: 杭州海康威視數字技術股份有限公司
- Literal meaning: Hangzhou Hikvision Digital Technology. Company Limited by Shares
Transcriptions
Standard Mandarin
- Hanyu Pinyin: Hángzhōu Hǎikāng Wēishì Shùzì Jìshù Gǔfèn Yǒuxiàn Gōngsī

Alternative Chinese name
- Simplified Chinese: 海康威视
- Traditional Chinese: 海康威視
- Literal meaning: HIK–vision (Note: See also in the wiktionary for the individual meaning of the character 威 and 視; the concatenation 威視 has no meaning other than a compound word that is phonetically similar to vision.)
Transcriptions
Standard Mandarin
- Hanyu Pinyin: Hǎikāng Wēishì
- Footnotes in a consolidated basis (net assets and net profit excluding minority interests); in Chinese Accounting Standards

Hangzhou Hikvision Digital Technology Co., Ltd., often shortened to Hikvision, is a Chinese partly state-owned manufacturer and supplier of video surveillance equipment for civilian and military purposes, headquartered in Hangzhou, Zhejiang.

Due to its alleged involvement in mass surveillance of Uyghurs and the Xinjiang re-education camps and national security concerns, the company has been placed under sanctions from the U.S. and European governments.

== History ==
Hikvision was founded in 2001 by Zhejiang HIK Information Technology Co., Ltd. (Chinese: 浙江海康信息技术股份有限公司) with the company having a 51% stake and Gong Hongjia (龚虹嘉) a 49% stake at that time.

Hikvision has been listed on the Shenzhen Stock Exchange since 2010.

In October 2016, the company concluded a deal to use Movidius' computer vision technology.

In May 2017, Hikvision established Hikstorage, a subsidiary focused on the production of storage devices.

In January 2021, the company won a US$33 million, 1,900-camera smart city project in Shanghe County, Shandong that includes cameras with facial recognition and license plate recognition technologies.

In 2021, Best Buy, Home Depot, and Lowe's stopped selling cameras from Hikvision brand Ezviz due to concerns about Hikvision's complicity in surveillance and human rights violations in Xinjiang.

In 2022, Hikvision was awarded a Chinese government contract to develop software to track "key people" in order to prevent them from entering Beijing. The same year, IPVM also reported that Hikvision has specific alarms in its software to alert Chinese police to "religion, Falun Gong, and various protest activities. In 2022, Hikvision won a "smart campus" contract with the Chinese government to alert university administrators of students fasting during Ramadan. Amazon Web Services provides cloud services to Hikvision. In 2023, Hikvision released software that includes ethnic minority detection. In January 2024, Hikvision joined the United Nations Global Compact. In the 2020s, HikVision started developing surveillance products that integrate large language models (LLMs) which enable operators to search footage using text prompts to retrieve the relevant video. After HikVision started offering such systems, local governments across China started integrating the products to their existing surveillance system.

=== Sanctions and bans ===
In January 2019, the U.S. government began considering whether it should sanction Hikvision, which American government officials described as having "provided thousands of cameras that monitor mosques, schools, and concentration camps in Xinjiang."

The U.S. government banned Hikvision from receiving federal government contracts in August 2019 due to security concerns. In October 2019, Hikvision was formally placed on the Entity List by the U.S. government, which stated that it was involved in surveillance of Uyghurs in Xinjiang and of other ethnic and religious minorities in China. Hikvision expressed its opposition to the U.S. decision and stated that they believe the decision had no factual basis. They urged the U.S. government to re-examine its decision.

In response to the bans and sanctions, Hikvision has hired former U.S. ambassador Pierre-Richard Prosper "to advise the company regarding human rights compliance" as well as numerous lobbyists, including former U.S. senators David Vitter and Barbara Boxer, former U.S. congressman Toby Moffett, and a former senior OFAC official.

In August 2020, the Indian government banned Hikvision from bidding in government tenders and also required removal of Hikvision cameras from military and high-security areas.

In April 2021, the European Parliament confirmed that it had removed Hikvision thermal cameras from its premises following the approval of an amendment sponsored by Dutch MEP Lara Wolters calling for the removal of "all of Hikvision’s thermal cameras from Parliament’s premises" due to "an unacceptable risk that Hikvision, through its operations in Xinjiang, is contributing to serious human rights abuses."

In July 2021, the UK Foreign Affairs Select Committee published a report stating that Hikvision cameras "have been deployed throughout Xinjiang, and provide the primary camera technology used in the internment camps".

In June 2022, documents from the Xinjiang Police Files showed how Hikvision technology is used by Xinjiang police to surveil all Xinjiang residents.

In June 2021, 224 Hikvision products were banned for one year by South Korea's Ministry of Science and ICT over forged test reports.

In September 2021, the Indian Navy's headquarters "asked its all formations to 'discontinue' procurement of CCTV cameras and surveillance systems from Hikvision," according to The Week. The Week also reported that the Indian Navy had ordered the replacement and destruction of its existing Hikvision cameras.

In April 2022, the UK Department of Health and Social Care banned the purchase of Hikvision cameras. In November 2022, the UK prohibited the use of Hikvision equipment in government buildings.

In August 2022, the Ministry of Business, Innovation and Employment of New Zealand said that it would stop buying Hikvision cameras.

In February 2023, Australia's Department of Defence announced that it will remove cameras made by Hikvision from its buildings.

In June 2023, Ukraine's National Agency on Corruption Prevention declared Hikvision an "international sponsor of war" for supplying dual-purpose equipment to Russia that can be used for military purposes.

In October 2023, Hikvision reportedly recommitted its operations to the United Kingdom after clarifying that the ban on its cameras on sensitive sites does not extend to public authorities or police stations. The use of their security cameras was adopted by U.K. authorities despite opposition from ministers worrying of "security threats". As a response, the U.K. parliament updated the definition of their ban on sensitive sites.

In December 2023, Quebec banned the use of Hikvision technology in government. In January 2024, Taiwanese authorities indicted a Hikvision employee for illegally recruiting and establishing a Hikvision office in Taiwan through a shell corporation.

In April 2026, India banned the use of Chinese video surveillance equipment, including CCTV cameras from companies such as Hikvision, citing national security concerns. The Indian government has expressed worries that these product could be used for espionage, particularly following border tensions with China. The ban impacts government buildings, critical infrastructure, and public sector projects, as part of India's broader efforts to reduce reliance on Chinese technology in sensitive sectors.

==== United States ====
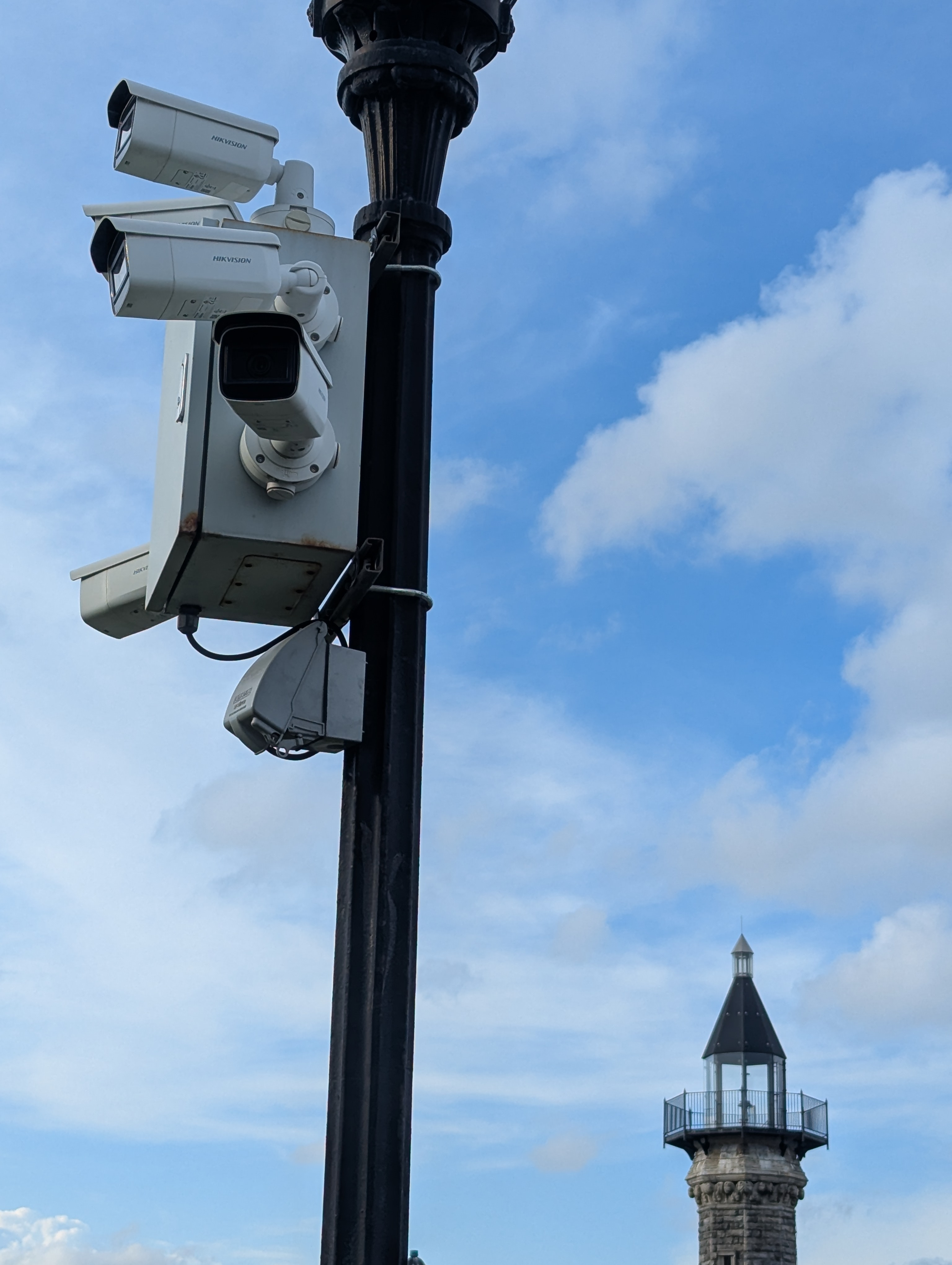
Hikvision cameras in New York City's Lighthouse Park (Roosevelt Island) in 2025

In November 2020, U.S. President Donald Trump issued an executive order prohibiting any American company or individual from owning shares in companies that the United States Department of Defense has listed as having links to the People's Liberation Army, which included Hikvision. In December 2020, Hikvision was removed from FTSE Russell.

On 12 January 2021, the Joe Biden inaugural committee returned a $500 donation to former U.S. Senator Barbara Boxer (D-CA) after she registered as a foreign agent for Hikvision.

In March 2021, the Federal Communications Commission (FCC) declared that Hikvision services and equipment "pose an unacceptable risk to U.S. national security." After President Joe Biden signed into law the Secure Equipment Act of 2021, in November 2022, the FCC banned sales or import of equipment made by Hikvision for national security reasons.

In March 2023, four Hikvision subsidiaries were added to the United States Department of Commerce's Entity List. In April 2023, BBC News reported that the US Department of Defense believes that Hikvision products are being white labeled and resold to the US government, creating a security risk.

In March 2025, the FCC opened an investigation into Hikvision and other Chinese companies regarding operations in the U.S. in violation of restrictions.

===== Lobbying =====
In 2018, Hikvision hired Sidley Austin and The Glover Park Group to lobby the U.S. federal government on its behalf. After having been initially registered under the U.S. Lobbying Disclosure Act from the start of their representation, the US Department of Justice requested Sidley Austin to update their registration under the Foreign Agents Registration Act in 2022. With the updated registration, the firm reported having received approximately $7.4 million in fees between 2018 and 2022, according to Reuters.

==== Canada ====
In June 2025, the Canadian federal government ordered Hikvision to close its operations in Canada due to national security concerns. In September 2025, the Federal Court dismissed a request from Hikvision to have the ruling thrown out.

=== Contribution to mass surveillance ===
Hikvision has been accused of supplying cameras for the purpose of surveillance of Palestinians in the West Bank, and in the mass surveillance of Uyghurs and the Xinjiang re-education camps.

=== Cybersecurity vulnerabilities ===
In May 2017, seven series of Hikvision cameras were affected by an improper authentication vulnerability which, if exploited, could allow "a malicious attacker [to] escalat[e] his or her privileges or assum[e] the identity of an authenticated user and [obtain] sensitive data," according to the U.S. Cybersecurity and Infrastructure Security Agency.

In May 2021, Italian public broadcaster RAI reported that Hikvision cameras automatically "opened communication channels with addresses registered in China" once connected to the internet. Hikvision declined to comment on the RAI investigation.

In September 2021, Hikvision announced a command injection vulnerability with the CVE-ID CVE-2021-36260.

In 2022, Axios reported that Hikvision had hired FTI Consulting to conduct cybersecurity audits of its products.

== Ownership ==
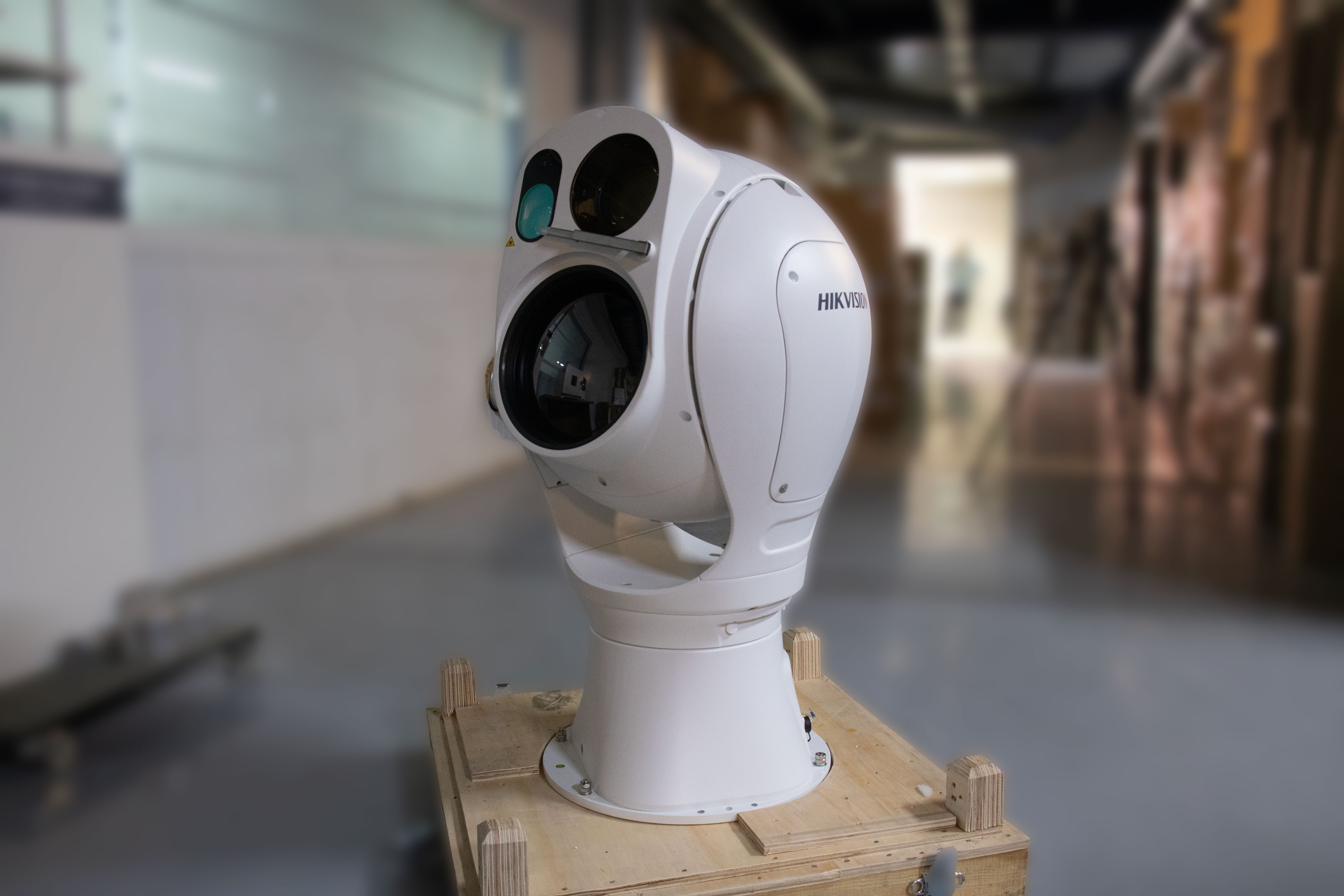
Hikvision, Thermal & Optical Bi-spectrum Network Sphere Positioning System

As of 31 December 2017, Hikvision was owned by China Electronics Technology HIK Group Co., Ltd. (HIK Group, 中电海康集团有限公司), a wholly owned subsidiary of China Electronics Technology Group, which has a 39.59% stake. China Electronics Technology Group is a state-run enterprise owned and supervised by the State-owned Assets Supervision and Administration Commission of the State Council. China Electronics Technology Group holds an additional 1.96% stake of Hikvision via its 52nd research institute (中国电子科技集团公司第五十二研究所). The Chairman of Hikvision, Chen Zongnian (陈宗年), is also the chairman and the Party Committee Secretary of HIK Group, and Head of the aforementioned research institute.

As of November 2019 the firm's largest individual shareholder was vice-chairman Gong Hongjia with a 13% stake. As of 12 December 2019 Fidelity International was also a major investor in Hikvision.

In 2017, the third largest shareholder was a private equity fund (新疆威讯投资管理有限合伙企业; Xīnjiāng Wēixùn) which had a 7% stake, which is associated with then Hikvision general manager Hu Yangzhong. According to previous filing, "Xinjian Weixun" was also associated with Liu Xiang (刘翔), former director (from 2015 to March 2018) and former deputy general manager of Hikvision, then deputy general manager of HIK Group, chairman of sister listed company Phenix Optical.

In 2017, the fourth largest shareholder was another private equity fund (新普康投资有限合伙企业) which had a 2% stake. The fund was partly owned by Gong's wife Chen Chunmei (陈春梅) and aforementioned Hu Yangzhong. Hu Yangzhong also owned an additional 1.33% stake personally. To sum up, those shareholders owned a combined 65.71% stake. Lastly, Hong Kong Securities Clearing Company owned 9.77%, which was the nominees of the Shanghai-Hong Kong Stock Connect and Shenzhen-Hong Kong Stock Connect.

In 2021, IPVM alleged that Hikvision was created and controlled by the Chinese government.

According to the Financial Times, HikVision's supplier is the Shanghai Fullhan Microelectronics.

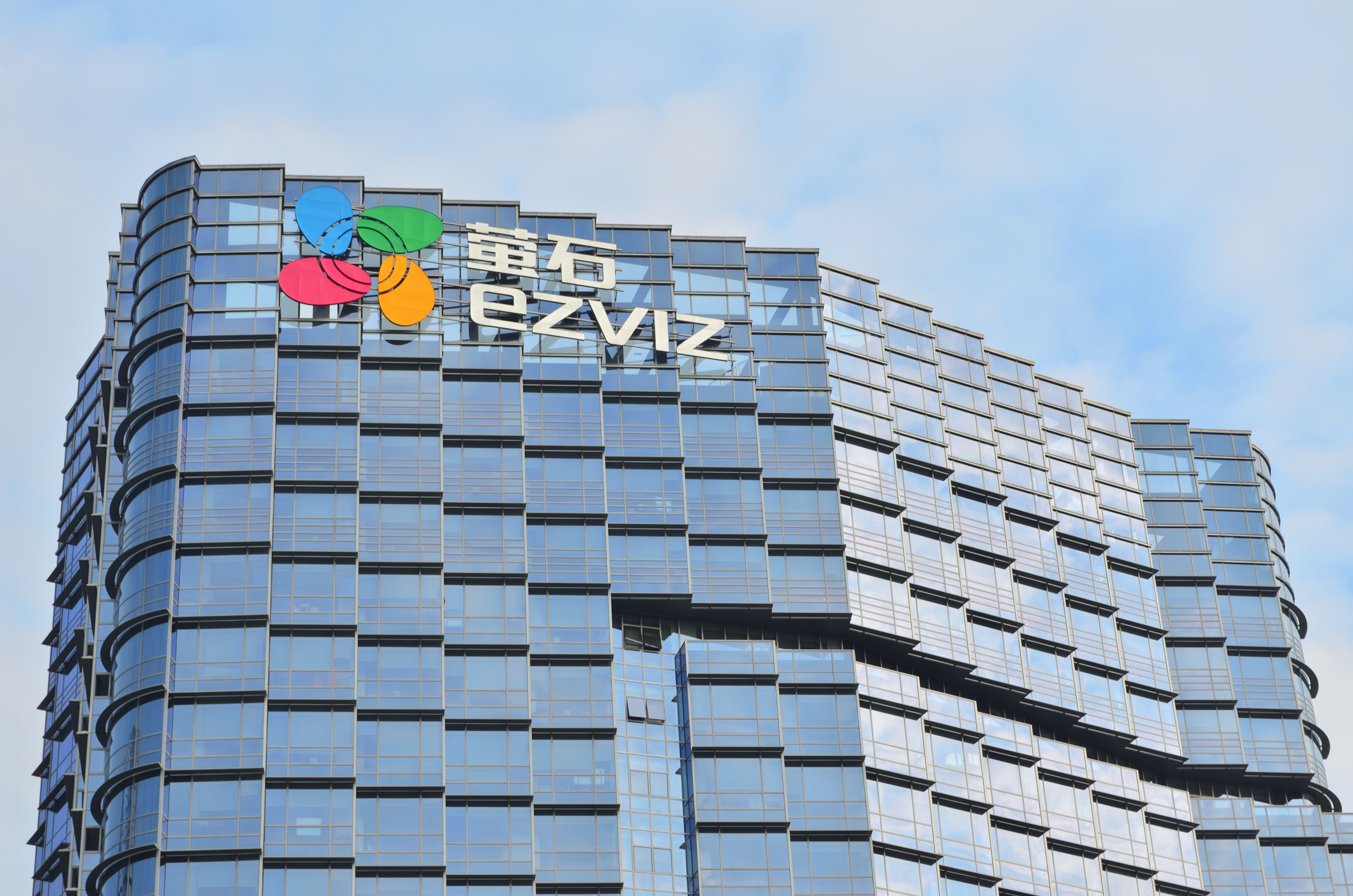
Ezviz office in Hangzhou

=== Alleged attempts to conceal government ownership ===
In 2015, IPVM criticized Hikvision for allegedly obscuring its Chinese government ownership. Jeffrey He, president of Hikvision North America, had criticized the online blogger site for allegedly seeking financial gain.

Alan West, in a 2016 interview published by The Times (and re-published by The Australian), suggested that Hikvision's ownership raised ethical and security concerns when it came to the usage of Hikvision's products by the British government.

== See also ==
- InfiRay
