= Virtual server =

Virtual server may refer to:

- Virtual environment (container), a container-based environment where the underlying hardware and OS is unchanged, but the application is sandboxed into a context where it sees a controlled environment of the environment variables and a particular version of a programming language etc. It may also be used to prevent this application making persistent changes outside of this sandbox.
- Virtual machine, a virtual emulation of a physical computer
- Virtual private server, a method of server hosting using virtual machines
- Virtual hosting, a method that servers such as webservers use to host more than one domain name on the same computer.
- Virtual hosting service, a form of web hosting service where more than one instance of the same web server is hosted on a single physical server.
- Another name for port forwarding used by some routers.
- Microsoft Virtual Server, a virtualization product produced by Microsoft based on Connectix technology.
