= Xuexi Qiangguo =

App for learning Xi Jinping Thought

- Developer: Alibaba Group Holding Limited
- Release: 1 January 2019
- Stable release: 2.70.0 / February 9, 2026; 8 months ago
- Operating system: iOS, Android
- Available in: Chinese
- Type: Educational software
- License: Proprietary
- Website: www.xuexi.cn

Xuexi Qiangguo
- Simplified Chinese: 学习强国
- Traditional Chinese: 學習強國
- Literal meaning: "Study and strengthen the nation", "Study the Great Nation", "Study Xi, Strong Nation"
Transcriptions
Standard Mandarin
- Hanyu Pinyin: xuéxí qiángguó
- Bopomofo: ㄒㄩㄝˊㄒㄧˊ ㄑㄧㄤˊㄍㄨㄛˊ
- Gwoyeu Romatzyh: shyueshyi chyanggwo
- IPA: [ɕɥě.ɕǐ tɕʰjǎŋ.kwǒ]

Xuexi Qiangguo (Chinese: 学习强国; pinyin: Xuéxí Qiángguó) is a Chinese mobile app primarily designed to teach Xi Jinping Thought. It is designed by Alibaba Group. Supervised by the Publicity Department of the Chinese Communist Party, it serves as a theoretical learning platform focusing on the speeches and thoughts of CCP General Secretary Xi Jinping.

The platform integrates news aggregation, instant messaging, and social networking functions, and is available as a mobile application (or app) and website. It was launched on January 1, 2019. Its logo includes the characters "Xuexi" (学习), derived from Chairman Mao Zedong's inscription "Study well and improve every day".

The application has been strongly promoted by government agencies, and CCP members have been encouraged to download it, according to official Chinese media reports. As of October 2019, it has more than 100 million active users and was the most downloaded item on Apple's Chinese App Store, surpassing social media apps such as WeChat and Douyin, before being overtaken by the National Anti-Fraud Center app, an anti-fraud educational app.

== History ==
The app was developed by Alibaba Group and released by the CCP's Propaganda Department. According to Reuters, citing two anonymous sources, Xuexi Qiangguo was developed by a little-known special project team from Alibaba called the "Y Project Business Group". This team was responsible for projects outside the company's primary scope. The team also maintains the app and is reportedly still hiring staff. Wang Huning, a member of the CCP Politburo Standing Committee, and other leading cadre presided over its development. It was launched in 2017 with a focus on party members, but has since been expanded for the general public. The app was launched on January 1, 2019.

By April 2019 it had more than 100 million active users according to Chinese state media. As of October 2019, it has more than 100 million active users and was the most downloaded item on Apple's Chinese App Store, surpassing social media apps such as WeChat and Douyin, before being overtaken by the National Anti-Fraud Center app, an anti-fraud educational app.

== Features ==
The name of the app is a pun on Chinese Communist Party (CCP) general secretary Xi Jinping's name. Xuéxí can mean "learning" or "learn from Xi."

The app includes sections such as "Top News", "New Thoughts", and "Comprehensive Current Affairs", featuring extensive speeches and multimedia content from Xi Jinping. It also provides Party history resources, introductions to tourist sites associated with the Chinese Communist Revolution, Chinese cultural materials, scholar courses, and live broadcasts of television and radio. Additionally, the platform includes a "Strong Nation Fitness" module, where users can record their steps to earn learning points and participate in organizational rankings. Aside from offering ideological courses, it allows video chat with friends, sending messages that get deleted after being read, creating a personal calendar, getting informed through the state media or watching TV series about the history of the Chinese Communist Party.

The app has a section about Xi Jinping's thoughts and life and weekly quizzes can be taken about Xi's life and the CCP where points can be won. The usage of each of these sections can provide the user with "study points". In late March 2019, the app removed its leaderboard feature for learning points, eliminated efficiency time, and reduced the maximum daily points users could earn. In April, the leaderboard feature was reinstated with new additions such as "National Total Ranking" and "Real-Time Ranking." The new rules drew further complaints, as the reduced points cap meant users needed to spend more time on the app, despite many state-owned enterprises, government bodies, and public institutions maintaining high point requirements.

Once the app is downloaded, it gains access to the ID card number, real name, "bio-data" gleaned from the annual health check, shopping history, phone number, location data and deleted content. Cure53 and the Open Technology Fund reported that the app allows Chinese government access to all of the data on Android-based phones.

On July 16, 2021, Xuexi Qiangguo introduced a collective learning tool called the "Qiangguo Machine". On October 21, 2021, the TV version of Xuexi Qiangguo, "Qiangguo TV", was launched in Shanghai. On January 18, 2023, Beijing Daily reported that the "Xuexi Qiangguo" platform was collaborating with "relevant departments" to develop a multidimensional digital transportation application platform called "Qiangguo Transportation", said to be the first "national-level travel platform" in the country. However, the Ministry of Transport denied any association with this platform. Xuexi Qiangguo later clarified that the project was a collaboration with the China Transport Telecommunications and Information Center under the Ministry of Transport and was merely a transfer application based on the State Council's "Cargo Journey Treasure" app.

== Promotion ==
The app is strongly promoted by the government institutions and party members get encouraged to download the app in order to "make the country strong". After its launch on New Year's Day in 2019, under the guidance of the Publicity Department, civil servants and CCP members across China were required to download and use the app, leading to a surge in downloads and its rise to the top of the Apple App Store rankings in China.

The app is also getting included in some university programs. Schools urge its students to learn from the app, employers give out certificates for "star learners", and some even require their employees to post a daily screenshot with their score at the app. Universities and local CCP branches directed and supervised members to use the app for political education, requiring faculty and staff to achieve a specified number of "learning points". According to Xinhua News Agency, the Henan Provincial Party Committee issued a report titled "Notice on the Registration and Usage of the 'Xuexi Qiangguo' Learning Platform by Party Members in Central and Provincial Units in Henan", detailing the number of registered users, the registration rate of active Party members, total points, and average points in various organizations. The notice also set specific targets, deadlines, and responsible persons to ensure the full registration of all Party members.

Several universities and local CCP branches also emphasized using the app for "work supervision and assessment", requiring mandatory points for Party members. Some universities and private companies required employees to link their learning points to offline performance evaluations. Additionally, there were reports of a civil servant in Jiangxi Province being detained for creating a program to automate point collection in the app. In August 2019, the Central Propaganda Department issued a notice requiring journalists applying for new press credentials to pass training and exams on the platform. By 2021, the app was being used for romance scams.

== Reception ==
In February 2019, Xuexi Qiangguo became the most downloaded app in the Chinese App Store. BBC described it as a digital version of the Little Red Book. In March 2019, Chinese social media saw a surge in promotional content for the app, claiming it was "beneficial and enjoyable". The platform integrates non-political knowledge and competitions into its political content, achieving full penetration of political ideology into daily life. The New York Times reported that many users in China viewed using the app as a display of patriotism.

People's Daily, the official newspaper of the CCP Central Committee, described the content of Xuexi Qiangguo as "authoritative, rich, and distinctive", claiming that it has been enthusiastically embraced by Party members and cadres. According to official Chinese media reports, some CCP members expressed their liking for the app, stating that it allows them to stay informed about current events and various policy guidelines. Additionally, the points leaderboard encourages high-performing Party members to maintain their scores while motivating lower-performing members to improve, fostering enthusiasm for learning among Party members. Some people have complained about being pressured to use the app, with students and workers reporting anonymously that teachers and bosses publicly shame or threaten to punish those who have low scores or use the app infrequently.

== See also ==
- Core Socialist Values
- Chinese Dream
- General Secretary Xi Jinping important speech series
- Xi Jinping's cult of personality
- Quotations from Chairman Mao Zedong
