= Raytron =

Chinese semiconductor maker

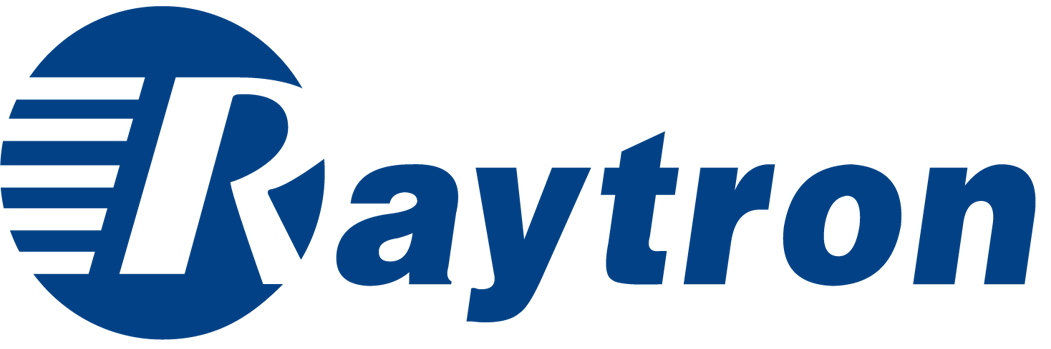
- Type: Public
- Traded as: SSE: 688002
- Industry: Semiconductors
- Founded: 2009; 17 years ago
- Headquarters: Yantai
- Products: Electrical sensors

Chinese name
- Simplified Chinese: 睿创微纳
- Traditional Chinese: 睿創微納
- Website: raytrontek.com

Raytron, also known as Raytron Technology, fully referred to as Yantai Raytron Technology Co., Ltd., is a Chinese semiconductor maker founded in 2009. It focuses on the infrared imaging and sensor fields. The main products of the company are infrared imaging sensors, and MEMS sensors. After approval from the CSRC, the firm was listed on the Shanghai Stock Exchange on July 22, 2019.

Headquartered in Yantai, Raytron is one of the first batch of companies listed on the STAR Market. The company was backed by Shenzhen Capital Group, and SDIC Unity Capital. In June 2016, it was transformed into a joint stock company. As of August 2020, it was a constituent of the STAR 50 Index. The firm's competitors include Guide Infrared and Dali Technology.

Raytron Turing L640 Pro

== History ==
Raytron was formed in 2009. On June 18, 2019, its IPO registration on the Sci-Tech Innovation Board took effect. In July, the company officially went public on the board under the stock ticker symbol "688002".

In its 2019 IPO, Raytron raised 1.2 billion yuan. In the first half of 2020, its revenue amounted to 693 million yuan. In H1 2021, this figure reached 870 million yuan.
