= Persecution of Uyghurs in China =

- Part of the Xinjiang conflict
- Detainees listening to speeches in a camp in Lop County, Xinjiang, April 2017

- Xinjiang, highlighted red, shown within China
- Location: Xinjiang, China
- Date: 2014–present
- Target: Uyghurs, Kazakhs, Kyrgyz, and other Turkic Muslims
- Attack type: Internment, forced abortion, forced sterilization, forced birth control, forced labor, torture, indoctrination, alleged rape (including gang rape), alleged cultural genocide
- Victim: est. ≥1 million detained
- Perpetrator: Government of China
- Motive: Counterterrorism (official); Sinicization, Islamophobia, and suppression of political dissent

Since 2014, the government of China has committed a series of ongoing human rights abuses against Uyghurs and other Turkic Muslim minorities in Xinjiang which has often been characterized as persecution or as genocide. There have been reports of mass arbitrary arrests and detention, torture, mass surveillance, cultural and religious persecution, family separation, forced labor, sexual violence, and violations of reproductive rights.

In 2014, the administration of Chinese Communist Party (CCP) general secretary Xi Jinping launched the Strike Hard Campaign Against Violent Terrorism, which involved surveillance and restrictions in Xinjiang. Beginning in 2017, under Xinjiang Party secretary Chen Quanguo, the government incarcerated over an estimated one million Uyghurs without legal process in re-education camps officially described as "vocational education and training centers", in the largest mass internment of an ethnic-religious minority group since World War II. China began to wind down the camps in 2019, and some detainees were transferred to the penal system, while others were transferred to forced labor and factory work programs.

In addition to mass detention, government policies have included suppression of Uyghur religious practices, political indoctrination, forced sterilization, forced contraception, and forced abortion. An estimated 16,000 mosques have been razed or damaged, and hundreds of thousands of children have been forcibly separated from their parents and sent to boarding schools. Since 2017, preferential family planning exemptions previously available to Uyghurs have reportedly been reduced or removed. Chinese government statistics reported that from 2015 to 2018, birth rates in the mostly Uyghur regions of Hotan and Kashgar fell by more than 60%. In the same period, the national birth rate decreased by 9.7%. According to CNN, Chinese authorities acknowledged that birth rates dropped by almost a third in 2018 in Xinjiang, but denied reports of forced sterilization. Birth rates in Xinjiang fell a further 24% in 2019, compared to a nationwide decrease of 4.2%. Chen Quanguo was succeeded by Ma Xingrui as Xinjiang Party Secretary in 2021; Ma's tenure led to the end to overt crackdowns and the campaign-style mobilization under Chen and shifted towards a "normalization" phase while continuing the previous policies facilitating ethnic assimilation.

The Chinese government denies having committed human rights abuses in Xinjiang. International reactions have varied, with its actions being described as the forced assimilation of Xinjiang, as ethnocide or cultural genocide, or as genocide. Those accusing China of genocide point to intentional acts they say violate Article II of the Genocide Convention, which prohibits "acts committed with intent to destroy, in whole or in part", a "racial or religious group" including "causing serious bodily or mental harm to members of the group" and "measures intended to prevent births within the group".

At the United Nations, several countries, predominantly North American or European, signed letters condemning China's policies. Whilst other countries, predominantly Asian or African, signed letters supporting the policies as an effort to combat terrorism in the region. In 2020, a case brought to the International Criminal Court was dismissed because China is not a party to the Rome Statute, meaning the ICC could not investigate them. In 2021, the United States Department of State declared China's actions as genocide, and legislatures in several countries have passed non-binding motions doing the same, while other parliaments, condemned the policies as "severe human rights abuses" or crimes against humanity. In a 2022 assessment, the Office of the United Nations High Commissioner for Human Rights (OHCHR) stated that China's policies and actions in the Xinjiang region may constitute crimes against humanity, though it did not use the term genocide. In 2026, the OHCHR described China's policies toward the Uyghurs as potentially amounting to "forcible transfer and/or enslavement as a crime against humanity."

== Background ==
=== Uyghur identity ===
Uyghurs are a Turkic ethnic group native to Xinjiang. They are distinct from the Han Chinese, the predominant ethnic group in China. Uyghurs are the second-largest predominantly Muslim ethnicity in China, after the Hui, and Sunni Islam is an important aspect of Uyghur identity. The Uyghur language has around 10 million speakers and is shared with other minority groups in the region.

=== Xinjiang conflict ===
Both Uyghur and the predominantly Han government lay claim to Xinjiang. This prompted an ethnic conflict featuring resistance and sporadic violence as Uyghurs sought greater autonomy. Sinologists Anna Hayes and Michael Clarke have described Xinjiang as undergoing a process of transition as the Chinese government attempts to transform it from a frontier region to an "integral" province of a unitary Chinese state.

==== Imperial China ====
Historically, certain Chinese dynasties exerted control over parts of modern-day Xinjiang. The region fully came under Chinese rule as a result of the westward expansion of the Manchu-led Qing dynasty during the 1700s, which also saw the conquests of Tibet and Mongolia. Xinjiang was a peripheral part of the Qing empire and briefly regained independence during the Dungan Revolt (1862–1877). The Uyghur population participated in the Dzungar genocide, resulting in the Qianlong emperor granting them permission to resettle in the former territories of Dzungaria.

==== Republican Era (1912–1949) ====
The region was semi-autonomous during the Republic of China's Warlord Era (1916–1928), with parts controlled by the Kumul Khanate, the Ma clique and later the warlord Jin Shuren. In 1933, the breakaway First East Turkestan Republic was established in the Kumul Rebellion, but was conquered the following year by warlord Sheng Shicai with the help of the Soviet Union. In 1944, the Ili Rebellion led to the establishment of the Second East Turkestan Republic, which was dependent on the Soviet Union until it was absorbed into the People's Republic of China in 1949.

==== People's Republic of China (1949–present) ====
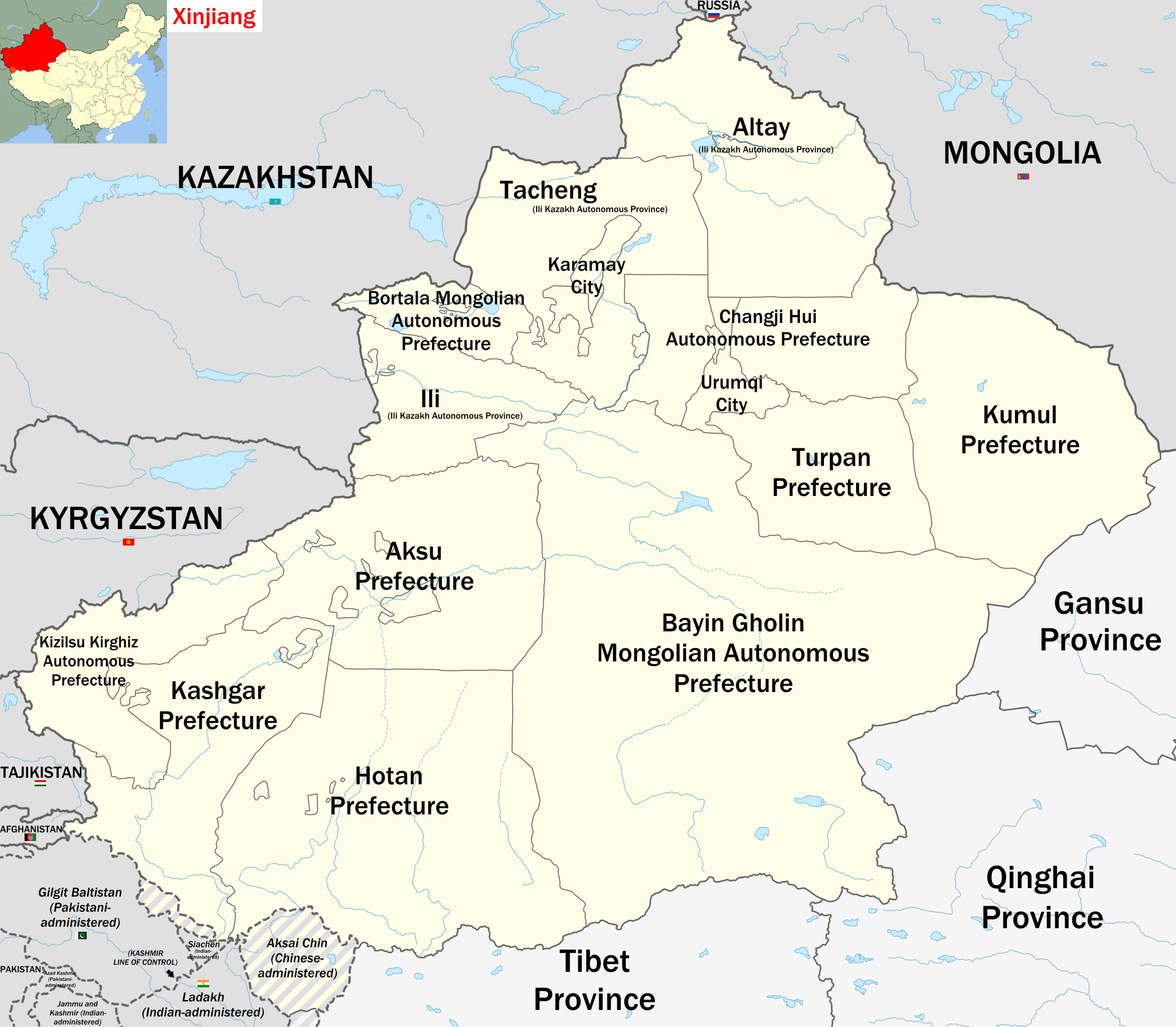
Present day map of Xinjiang and its internal and external borders

From the 1950s to the 1970s, the Chinese government sponsored a mass migration of Han Chinese to Xinjiang and introduced policies designed to suppress cultural identity and religion in the region. During this period, Uyghur independence organizations emerged with some support from the Soviet Union, with the East Turkestan People's Party being the largest in 1968. During the 1970s, the Soviets supported the United Revolutionary Front of East Turkestan (URFET) against the Han Chinese.

During the 1980s under Deng Xiaoping, China pursued a new policy of cultural liberalization in Xinjiang and adopted a flexible language policy nationally. Despite a positive response among party officials and minority groups, the Chinese government viewed this policy as unsuccessful and from the mid-1980s its official pluralistic language policy became increasingly subordinate to a covert policy of minority assimilation motivated by geopolitical concerns. Consequently, and in Xinjiang particularly, multilingualism and cultural pluralism were restricted to favor a "monolingual, monocultural model", which in turn helped to embed and strengthen an oppositional Uyghur identity. Attempts by the Chinese state to encourage economic development in the region by exploiting natural resources led to ethnic tension and discontent within Xinjiang over the region's lack of autonomy. In April 1990, the Barin uprising, near Kashgar, was suppressed by the People's Liberation Army (PLA), involving a large number of deaths. Writing in 1998, political scientist Barry Sautman considered policies designed to reduce inequality between Han Chinese and ethnic minorities in Xinjiang unsuccessful at eliminating conflicts because they were shaped by the "paternalistic and hierarchical approach to ethnic relations adopted by the Chinese government".

In February 1997, a police roundup and execution of suspected "separatists" during Ramadan led to large demonstrations, which led to a PLA crackdown on protesters resulting in at least nine deaths in what became known as the Ghulja incident. The Ürümqi bus bombings later that month killed nine people and injured 68, with Uyghur exile groups claiming responsibility. In March 1997, a bus bomb killed two people, with responsibility claimed by Uyghur separatists and the Turkey-based "Organisation for East Turkistan Freedom".

The July 2009 Ürümqi riots, which resulted in over one hundred deaths, broke out in response to the Shaoguan incident, a violent dispute between Uyghur and Han Chinese factory workers. Following the riots, Uyghur terrorists killed dozens of Han Chinese in coordinated attacks from 2009 to 2016. These included the September 2009 Xinjiang unrest, the 2011 Hotan attack, the 2014 Kunming attack, the April 2014 Ürümqi attack, and the May 2014 Ürümqi attack. The attacks were conducted by Uyghur separatists, with some orchestrated by the Turkistan Islamic Party (a UN-designated terrorist organization, formerly called the East Turkistan Islamic Movement).

== Government policies ==
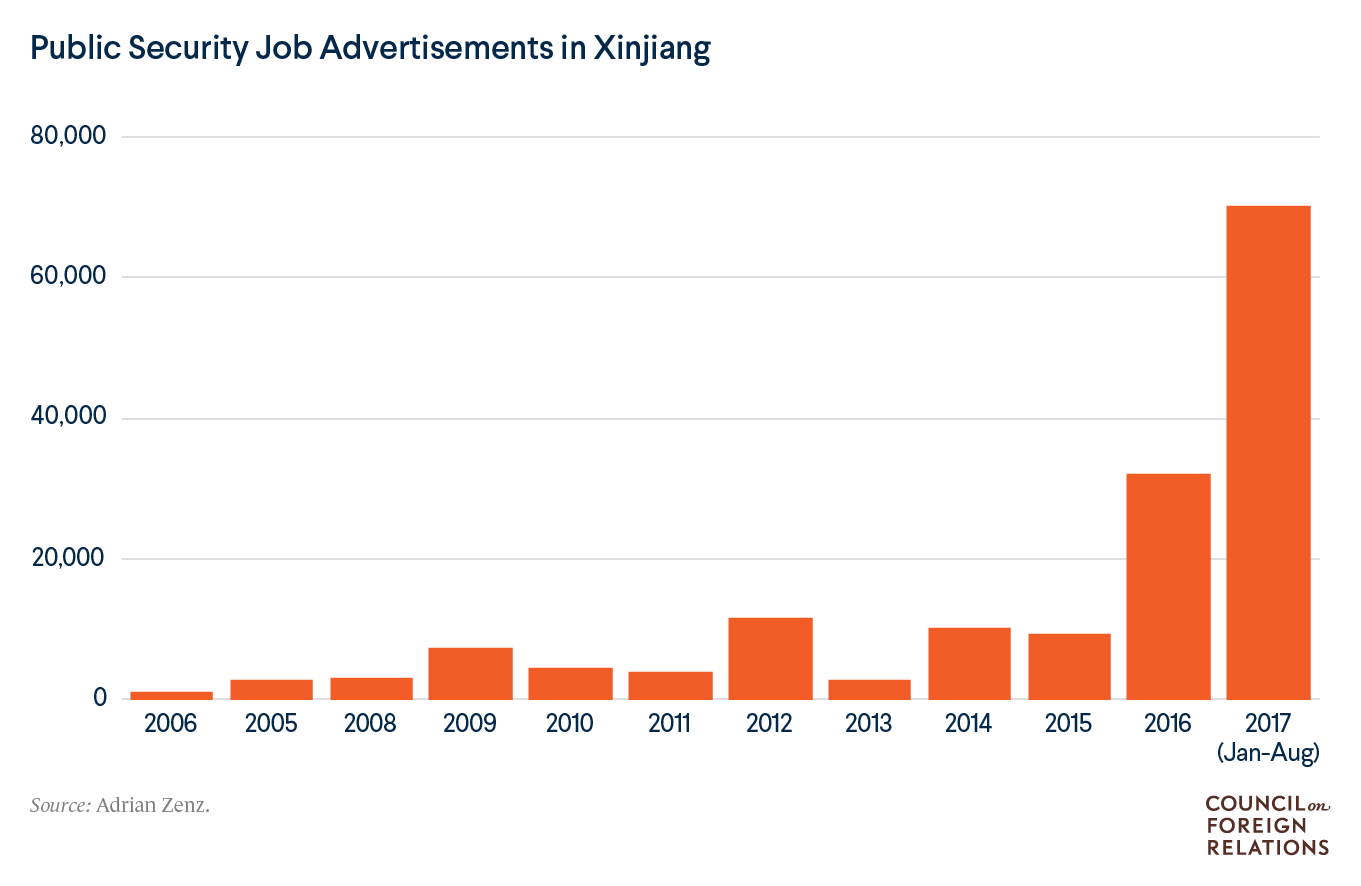
Xinjiang police job advertisements by year

Number of "re-education" related government procurement bids in Xinjiang

=== Initial "Strike Hard Campaign Against Violent Terrorism" ===
During the run-up to the 2008 Beijing Olympics, the Chinese state began to emphasize weiwen (stability maintenance) which led to an intensification of repression across the country. Some within the Party warned that increased action to combat instability which might not even exist could lead to a spiral of repression and unrest.

In April 2010, after the July 2009 Ürümqi riots, Zhang Chunxian replaced the former CCP secretary Wang Lequan, who had been behind religious policies in Xinjiang for 14 years. New policies were implemented by Zhang Chunxian. Following the 2014 Kunming attack that killed 31 people, Xi Jinping told the Politburo "We should unite the people to build a copper and iron wall against terrorism", and "Make terrorists like rats scurrying across the street, with everybody shouting, 'Beat them!'" In April 2014, Xi traveled to Xinjiang and told police in Kashgar that "We must be as harsh as them, and show absolutely no mercy." A suicide bombing occurred in Ürümqi on the last day of his visit.

In 2014, a secret meeting of CCP leadership was held in Beijing to find a solution to the problem, which would become known as the Strike Hard Campaign Against Violent Terrorism. In May 2014, China publicly launched the campaign in Xinjiang in response to growing tensions between the Han Chinese and the Uyghur populations of Xinjiang. Following the announcement of the campaign, CCP general secretary Xi Jinping held the Central Symposium on Work in Xinjiang, where he outlined new CCP policies toward Xinjiang and stated that "practice has proved that our party's ruling strategy in Xinjiang is correct and must be maintained in the long run".

Following guidance from Beijing, CCP leadership in Xinjiang commenced a "People's War" against the "Three Evils" of separatism, terrorism, and extremism. They deployed two hundred thousand party cadres to Xinjiang and launched the Civil Servant-Family Pair Up program. Xi was dissatisfied with the initial results of the People's War and replaced Zhang Chunxian with Chen Quanguo in 2016. Following his appointment Chen oversaw the recruitment of tens of thousands of additional police officers and the division of society into three categories: trusted, average, and untrustworthy. He instructed his subordinates to "Take this crackdown as the top project", and "to preempt the enemy, to strike at the outset".

=== Regulations since 2017 ===
Following a meeting with Xi in Beijing, Chen Quanguo held a rally in Ürümqi with ten thousand troops, helicopters, and armored vehicles. As they paraded, he announced a "smashing, obliterating offensive", and declared that they would "bury the corpses of terrorists and terror gangs in the vast sea of the People's War." He ordered them to "round up everyone who should be rounded up", and by April 2017 mass arrests had begun. New bans and regulations were implemented on 1 April 2017. Abnormally long beards and the wearing of veils in public were both banned. Not watching state-run television or listening to radio broadcasts, refusing to abide by family planning policies, or refusing to allow one's children to attend state-run schools were all prohibited.

In 2017, China's Ministry of Public Security began to procure race-based monitoring systems which could reportedly identify whether or not an individual was Uyghur. Despite its questionable accuracy, this allowed a "Uyghur alarm" to be added to surveillance systems. Enhanced border controls were also implemented with guilt being presumed in the absence of evidence. Zhu Hailun, Communist Party secretary of Kashgar, signed off on a bulletin in 2017 that presumed guilt in persons from Xinjing who had travelled abroad. According to Zhu, "If suspected terrorism cannot be ruled out, then a border control should be implemented to insure the person's arrest".

In 2017, 73% of foreign journalists in China reported being restricted or prohibited from reporting in Xinjiang, up from 42% in 2016.

Alleged "re-education" efforts began in 2014 and were expanded in 2017. Re-education camps were built for the housing of students of the "re-education" programs, most of whom were Uyghurs. Chen ordered that the camps "be managed like the military and defended like a prison". The Chinese government did not acknowledge the camps' existence until 2018 and called them "vocational education and training centers". From 2019, the government began referring to them as "vocational training centers". The camps tripled in size from 2018 to 2019 despite the Chinese government stating that most of the detainees had been released.

The use of these centers appears to have ended in 2019 following international pressure. Academic Kerry Brown attributes their closures beginning in late 2019 to the expense required to operate them. Although no comprehensive independent surveys of such centers have been performed as of October 2022, spot checks by journalists have found such sites converted or abandoned. In 2022, a Washington Post reporter checked a dozen sites previously identified as re-education centers and found "[m]ost of them appeared to be empty or converted, with several sites labeled as coronavirus quarantine facilities, teachers' schools and vocational schools."

In December 2021, Chen Quanguo was succeeded as Xinjiang Party Secretary by Ma Xingrui, the governor of Guangdong. Since his accession to the post, Xinjiang has seen relative normalization in some aspects, such as turnstiles between residential areas being removed and two-day breaks in weekends for public officials being restored. Chen's departure led to the end of overt crackdowns and the campaign-style mobilization in Xinjiang, with Ma bringing what Zenz describes as normalizing a "coercive environment".

=== Propaganda campaign ===
The Chinese government has engaged in a propaganda campaign to defend its actions in Xinjiang. China initially denied the existence of the Xinjiang re-education camps and attempted to cover up their existence. In 2018, after widespread reporting forced it to admit that the Xinjiang re-education camps exist, the Chinese government initiated a campaign to portray the camps as humane and to deny that human rights abuses occurred in Xinjiang. In 2020 and 2021, the propaganda campaign expanded due to rising international backlash against government policies, with the Chinese government worrying that it no longer had control of the narrative.

Chinese authorities have responded to allegations of abuse by Uyghur women by mounting character attacks. This included the disclosure of confidential medical and personal information in an attempt to slander witnesses and undermine their testimony. The goal of these attacks appeared to be to silence further criticism, rather than to refute specific claims made by critics. Presentations given by Xinjiang's publicity department and the Ministry of Foreign Affairs to dispel allegations of abuse are closed to foreign journalists and feature pre-recorded questions as well as pre-recorded monologues from people in Xinjiang, including relatives of witnesses.

Chinese government propaganda attacks have also targeted international journalists covering human rights abuses in Xinjiang. After providing coverage critical of Chinese government abuses in Xinjiang, BBC News reporter John Sudworth was subjected to a campaign of propaganda and harassment by Chinese state-affiliated and CCP-affiliated media. The public attacks resulted in Sudworth and his wife Yvonne Murray, who reports for Raidió Teilifís Éireann, fleeing China for Taiwan fearing for their safety.

The Chinese government has used social media as a part of its propaganda campaign. The government purchased Facebook advertisements to spread propaganda designed to incite doubt on the existence and scope of human rights violations occurring within Xinjiang. Douyin presents its users with Chinese state propaganda pertaining to the human rights abuses in Xinjiang. Between July 2019 and early August 2019, CCP-owned tabloid the Global Times paid Twitter to promote tweets that denied that the Chinese government was committing human rights abuses in Xinjiang; Twitter later banned advertising from state-controlled media outlets on 19 August after removing large numbers of pro-Beijing bots from the social network.

In April 2021, the Chinese government released 5 propaganda videos titled, "Xinjiang is a Wonderful Land", and released a musical titled "The Wings of Songs" which portrayed Xinjiang as harmonious and peaceful. The Wings of Songs portrays "a rural idyll of ethnic cohesion devoid of repression, mass surveillance" and without Islam.

In June 2021, ProPublica documented a Chinese government-backed propaganda campaign on Twitter and YouTube involving more than 5000 videos analysed. The videos showed Uyghurs in Xinjiang denying abuses and scolding foreign officials and multinational corporations who had questioned China's human rights record in the province. Some of the videos' accounts were removed on YouTube as part of YouTube's efforts to combat spam and influence operations.

In October 2022, the Australian Strategic Policy Institute documented a number of CCP-backed Uyghur influencers in Xinjiang posting propaganda videos on Chinese and Western social media which pushed back against abuse allegations. Some of the influencers' accounts were suspended on Twitter for alleged inauthenticity.

On 30 October 2023, the Chinese embassy in France posted a photo on X comparing the buildings in Xinjiang, which were standing intact, with buildings in Gaza that had been destroyed in the Gaza war. East Turkestan Government in Exile leader Salih Hudayar and Uyghur lawyer Rayhan Asat criticized the photo as propaganda and argued that China's crackdown was more pervasive than the situation in Gaza.

==== Counter-terrorism justification ====
China has used the global "war on terror" of the 2000s to frame "separatist" and ethnic unrest as acts of Islamist terrorism to legitimize its policies in Xinjiang. Scholars such as Sean Roberts and David Tobin have described Islamophobia and fear of terrorism as discourses that have been used within China to justify repressive policies targeting Uyghurs, arguing that violence against Uyghurs should be seen in the context of Chinese colonialism, rather than exclusively as a part of an anti-terrorism campaign. According to academic David Tobin, since 2012, "Chinese education about Uyghurs tends to frame Uyghur identities as racialised, culturally external existential threats to be defeated by state violence or teaching them to be Chinese."

Arienne Dwyer, professor emerita at University of Kansas, has written that the US war on terror gave China an opportunity to characterise and "conflate" Uyghur nationalism with terrorism, particularity through the use of state-run media. Dwyer argues that the influence of fundamentalist forms of Islam such as Salafism within Xinjiang is overstated by China as it is tempered by Uyghur Sufism.

In December 2015, the Associated Press reported that China had effectively expelled Ursula Gauthier, a French journalist, "for questioning the official line equating ethnic violence in the western Muslim region with global terrorism". Gauthier, who was the first foreign journalist forced to leave China since 2012, was subjected to what the AP described as an "abusive and intimidating campaign" by Chinese state media that accused her of "having hurt the feelings of the Chinese people" and that a Chinese Foreign Ministry spokesman accused her of emboldening terrorism.

In August 2018, the United Nations Committee on the Elimination of Racial Discrimination decried the "broad definition of terrorism and vague references to extremism" used by Chinese legislation, noting that there were numerous reports of detention of large numbers of ethnic Uyghurs and other Muslim minorities on the "pretext of countering terrorism".

In 2019, Sam Brownback, Nathan Sales, and the editorial board of The Wall Street Journal each said that the Chinese government consistently misused "counterterrorism" as a pretext for cultural suppression and human rights abuses.

In 2021, Shirzat Bawudun, the former head of the Xinjiang department of justice, and Sattar Sawut, the former head of the Xinjiang education department, were sentenced to death with two years reprieve on terrorism and separatism charges. Three other educators and two textbook editors were given lesser sentences. One of the Uyghur textbook editors, Yalqun Rozi, received a 15-year prison sentence. His son, Kamaltürk Yalqun, speculated that the reason was that the textbooks his father had edited were "rich in Uyghur culture", and that the government is trying to eliminate that culture and to "erase history and write a new narrative".

== Human rights abuses ==
=== Inside re-education camps ===
==== Mass detention ====
Especially since 2016, re-education camps have been a part of the Chinese government's strategy to govern Xinjiang through the detention of ethnic minorities en masse. Key contributors to international attention on the Xinjiang re-education camps have included researcher Adrian Zenz, a social scientist at European School of Culture and Theology. Zenz authored one of the early estimates of the number of Uyghur detainees in Xinjiang, using accounting figures from a document reportedly leaked by anonymous Chinese public security officials to Istiqlal, a Turkey-based Uighur exile media organization. Zenz's first estimate placed the number of detainees at around 892,000 across 68 counties in spring 2018. Using his own research and reports by Radio Free Asia, Zenz later estimated that figures "anywhere between several hundred thousand and just over one million" were reasonable.

In 2021, CNN published an interview with a former Xinjiang police officer who said that when the police planned to raid a Uyghur village, they would sometimes arrange for the entire village to gather for a meeting with their chief so that the police could show up and arrest everyone. On other occasions the police would go door-to-door with rifles and pull all the residents from their homes overnight. Once the police had arrested people, they would interrogate and beat every man, woman, and child over age 14 until they kneeled on the floor and cried.

Researchers and organizations have made various estimates of the number of Xinjiang re-education camp detainees. In 2018, United Nations Committee on the Elimination of Racial Discrimination vice chairperson Gay McDougall indicated that around 1 million Uyghurs were being held in re-education camps. While McDougall did not cite sources for her statement, it was consistent with a report submitted to the committee by the Network of Chinese Human Rights Defenders. Other estimates submitted to the committee were more careful, with Human Rights Watch estimating at least tens of thousands and Amnesty International estimating tens of thousands to hundreds of thousands of detainees.

In March 2019, Adrian Zenz told the United Nations that 1.5 million Uyghurs had been detained in camps, saying that the number accounted for the increases in the size and scope of detention in the region and public reporting on the stories of Uyghur exiles with family in re-education camps. In July 2019, Zenz wrote in a paper published by the Journal of Political Risk that 1.5 million Uyghurs had been extrajudicially detained, which he described as being "an equivalent to just under one in six adult members of a Turkic and predominantly Muslim minority group in Xinjiang." In November 2019, Zenz estimated that the number of re-education camps in Xinjiang had surpassed 1,000. In July 2020, Zenz wrote in Foreign Policy that his estimate had increased since November 2019, estimating that a total of 1.8 million Uyghurs and other Muslim minorities had been extrajudicially detained in what he described as "the largest incarceration of an ethnoreligious minority since the Holocaust", arguing that the Chinese Government was engaging in policies in violation of the United Nations Convention on the Prevention and Punishment of the Crime of Genocide. In September 2020, a Chinese government white paper stated that an average of 1.29 million workers went through "vocational training" per year between 2014 and 2019, though it does not specify how many of the people received the training in camps or how many times they went through training. Adrian Zenz stated that this "gives us a possible scope of coercive labor" occurring in Xinjiang.

According to a 2020 study by Joanne Smith Finley, "political re-education involves coercive Sinicization, deaths in the camps through malnutrition, unsanitary conditions, withheld medical care, and violence (beatings); rape of male and female prisoners; and, since the end of 2018, transfers of the most recalcitrant prisoners – usually young, religious males – to high-security prisons in Xinjiang or inner China. Other camp 'graduates' have been sent into securitized forced labour. Those who remain outside the camps have been terrified into religious and cultural self-censorship through the threat of internment."

According to Zenz, the mass internments peaked in 2018 and have abated since then, with officials shifting focus towards forced labor programs. In September 2023, Amnesty International said that they were "witnessing more and more arbitrary detention", but that detained individuals were being moved from the camps into the formal prison system. As of April 2024, the Uyghur Human Rights Project estimated that China had imprisoned 449,000 Uyghurs or about one in 17.

==== Deaths ====
There have been numerous reports since 2018 of Uyghurs dying in detention, and of former detainees dying as a result of injuries sustained in custody. Human Rights Watch stated that as of April 2021 there had been at least 177 such deaths, and that the Chinese government often refused to acknowledge them. Other deaths have reportedly occurred through starvation and refusal to provide medical care. According to the New Lines Institute for Strategy and Policy, Uyghur religious figures are more likely to die or disappear in custody than other detainees.

There have been several reports of mass deaths of prisoners in the re-education camps. In 2019 Radio Free Asia, a United States government-funded broadcaster, reported that a Chinese police officer who previously served as a camp administrative assistant had confirmed that 150 Uyghurs had died at the No. 1 internment camp in Kuqa County. Former detainee Mihrigul Tursun claimed that nine women had died in one camp during the three months she was held there, which she attributed to the poor conditions they were held in.

American researcher Ethan Gutmann estimated in December 2020 that 5 to 10 percent of detainees had died each year in the camps. Russian-American scholar Gene Bunin created the Xinjiang Victims Database which had documented 12,050 victims in April 2021, and 225 deaths for those serving official prison sentences as of November 2023. The database drew ridicule online after it included photos of Hong Kong actors Andy Lau and Chow Yun-fat in a list of police officers allegedly responsible for the crackdowns. After it drew attention on social media, the Xinjiang Victims Database responded that the data were sourced from a file cache of an Ürümqi database previously written about in The Intercept, with the police officers occasionally using avatars that were not photos of themselves, including that of Andy Lau, which had not been noticed by the database staff. The photos assigned to police officer profiles also contained a cartoon portrait of police officer Jin Xiaowei, believed to be his likeness, which was also criticized in Chinese media.

In 2021, a former Xinjiang police officer told Sky News that imprisoned Uyghurs were frequently beaten to death by interrogators during his service.

==== Torture ====
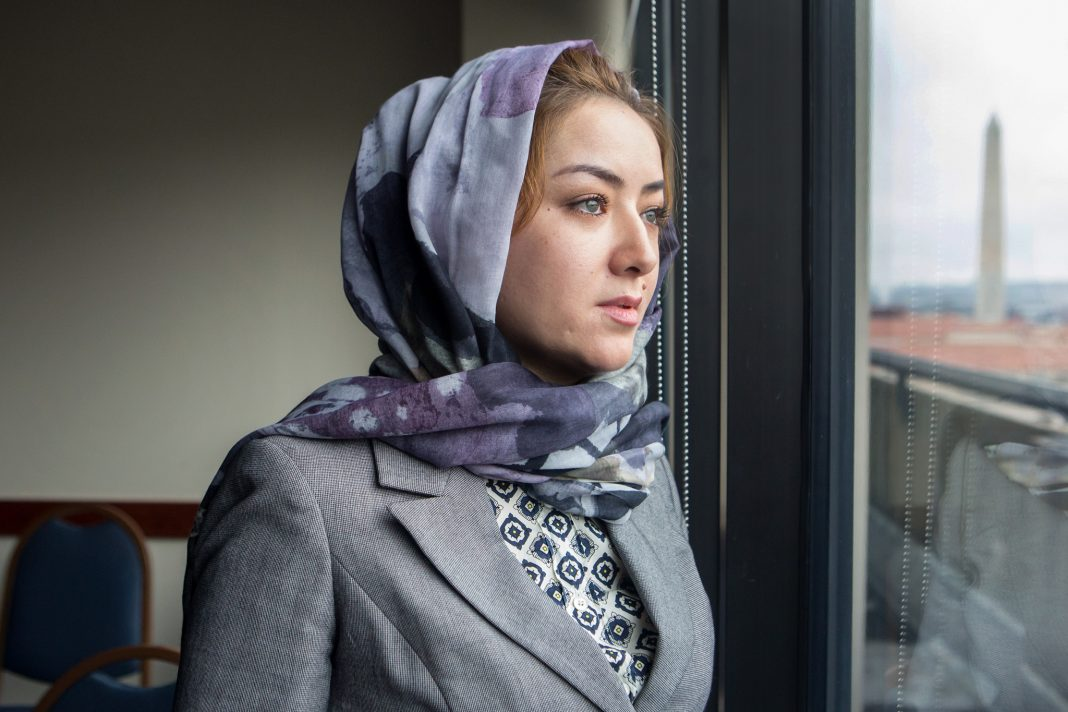
Mihrigul Tursun, a former detainee of the Xinjiang re-education camps

Rights groups and others have reported that Uyghurs living in Xinjiang have been subjected to torture by authorities. A former Chinese police detective, exiled in Europe, revealed to CNN in 2021 details of the systematic torture of Uyghurs in detention camps in Xinjiang, acts in which he had participated, and the fear of his own arrest had he dissented while in China.

Mihrigul Tursun, a young Uyghur mother, said that she was "tortured and subjected to other brutal conditions." In 2018, Tursun gave an interview during which she described her experience while at the camps; she was drugged, interrogated for days without sleep, subjected to intrusive medical examinations, and strapped in a chair and received electric shocks. It was her third time being sent to a camp since 2015. Tursun told reporters that she remembered interrogators tell her "Being a Uighur is a crime." Chinese Foreign Ministry spokesperson Hua Chunying stated that Tursun was taken into custody by police on "suspicion of inciting ethnic hatred and discrimination" for a period lasting 20 days and denied that Tursun was ever detained in an re-education camp.

Another past detainee, Kayrat Samarkand, described wearing "what they called 'iron clothes,' a suit made of metal that weighed over 50 pounds [23 kg]... It forced my arms and legs into an outstretched position. I couldn't move at all, and my back was in terrible pain...They made people wear this thing to break their spirits. After 12 hours, I became so soft, quiet and lawful."

Waterboarding is reportedly among the forms of torture which have been used as part of the indoctrination process.

==== Changes in family planning policy ====
When China's one-child policy was instituted in 1979, the restrictions largely applied to Han Chinese, people from ethnic minorities were generally exempt. In 2017, the Chinese government removed these exemptions such that the same family size limits applied to everyone, regardless of ethnicity. According to a 2021 ASPI report, since around April 2017, the Chinese government had reduced or removed preferential family planning exemptions previously available to ethnic minorities and pursued campaigns targeting what were described as "illegal births" in Xinjiang. The report found that these measures were associated with a sharp decline in official birth rates in Xinjiang, which fell by almost half (48.74%) in the two years between 2017 and 2019.

==== Compulsory sterilizations and contraception ====
In 2019, reports of forced sterilization in Xinjiang began to surface. Zumrat Dwut, a Uyghur woman, says that she was forcibly sterilized by tubal ligation during her time in a camp before her husband was able to get her out through requests to Pakistani diplomats. The Xinjiang regional government denies that she was forcibly sterilized. Sayragul Sauytbay, an ethnic Kazakh teacher who later fled China, said that rape and torture were commonplace and that authorities forced detainees to take a medicine that left some individuals sterile or cognitively impaired.

In 2020, the Associated Press interviewed seven former detainees from re-education camps who said they had been forced to take birth control pills or injected with fluids without explanation, which caused women to stop getting periods. The AP suggested the fluid may have been the hormonal medication Depo-Provera, which is commonly used in Xinjiang hospitals for birth control.

In April 2021, exiled Uyghur doctor Gülgine reported that forced sterilization of ethnic Uyghurs persisted since the 1980s. Since 2014, there was an indication for a sharp increase in sterilization of Uyghur women to ensure that Uyghurs would remain a minority in the region. Gülgine said "On some days there were about 80 surgeries to carry out forced sterilizations". She presented intrauterine devices (IUDs) and remarked that "these devices were inserted into women's wombs" to forcibly cause infertility.

==== Indoctrination ====
Former detainee Kayrat Samarkand described his camp routine in an article for NPR in 2018: "In addition to living in cramped quarters, he says inmates had to sing songs praising Chinese leader Xi Jinping before being allowed to eat. He says detainees were forced to memorize a list of what he calls '126 lies' about religion: 'Religion is opium, religion is bad, you must believe in no religion, you must believe in the Communist Party,' he remembers. 'Only [the] Communist Party could lead you to the bright future.'"

In 2021, Gulbahar Haitiwaji reported being coerced into denouncing her family after her daughter was photographed at a protest in Paris.

==== Forced labor ====
According to Quartz, the Xinjiang region is described by the Uyghur Human Rights Project as a 'cotton gulag' where prison labor is used throughout the cotton supply chain. Tahir Hamut, a Uyghur, worked in a labor camp during elementary school when he was a child, and he later worked in a labor camp as an adult, performing tasks such as picking cotton, shoveling gravel, and making bricks. He said: "Everyone is forced to do all types of hard labor or face punishment. Anyone unable to complete their duties will be beaten."

BuzzFeed News reported in December 2020 that "[f]orced labor on a vast scale is almost certainly taking place" inside the Xinjiang re-education camps, with 135 factory facilities identified within the camps covering over 21 million square feet (2.0 km^{2}) of land. The report noted that "[f]ourteen million square feet of new factories were built in 2018 alone" within the camps and that "former detainees said they were never given a choice about working, and that they earned a pittance or no pay at all".

A Chinese website hosted by Baidu has posted job listings for transferring Uyghur laborers in batches of 50 to 100 people from Xinjiang to elsewhere within China. The 2019 Five Year Plan of the Xinjiang government has an official "labour transfer programme" "to provide more employment opportunities for the surplus rural labour force". These batches of Uyghurs are under "half-military" style management and direct supervision. A seafood processing plant owner said that the Uyghur workforce in his factory had returned home to Xinjiang due to the COVID-19 pandemic, and that the Uyghurs had been paid and housed properly while at his factory.

As part of forced labor schemes, Uyghurs have been transferred to factories outside of Xinjiang. According to research by the Australian Strategic Policy Institute, due to the transfer of Uyghurs from Xinjiang to factories within China, Uyghur workforce was present in the factories that are in the supply chains of at least 82 well-known global companies, including Marks & Spencer, Samsung, and Nike. In response, companies such as Marks & Spencer pledged that it would not happen again by checking supply lines. Samsung said that it would ensure that previous controls ensured good work conditions under its code of conduct. Apple, Esprit, and Fila did not respond.

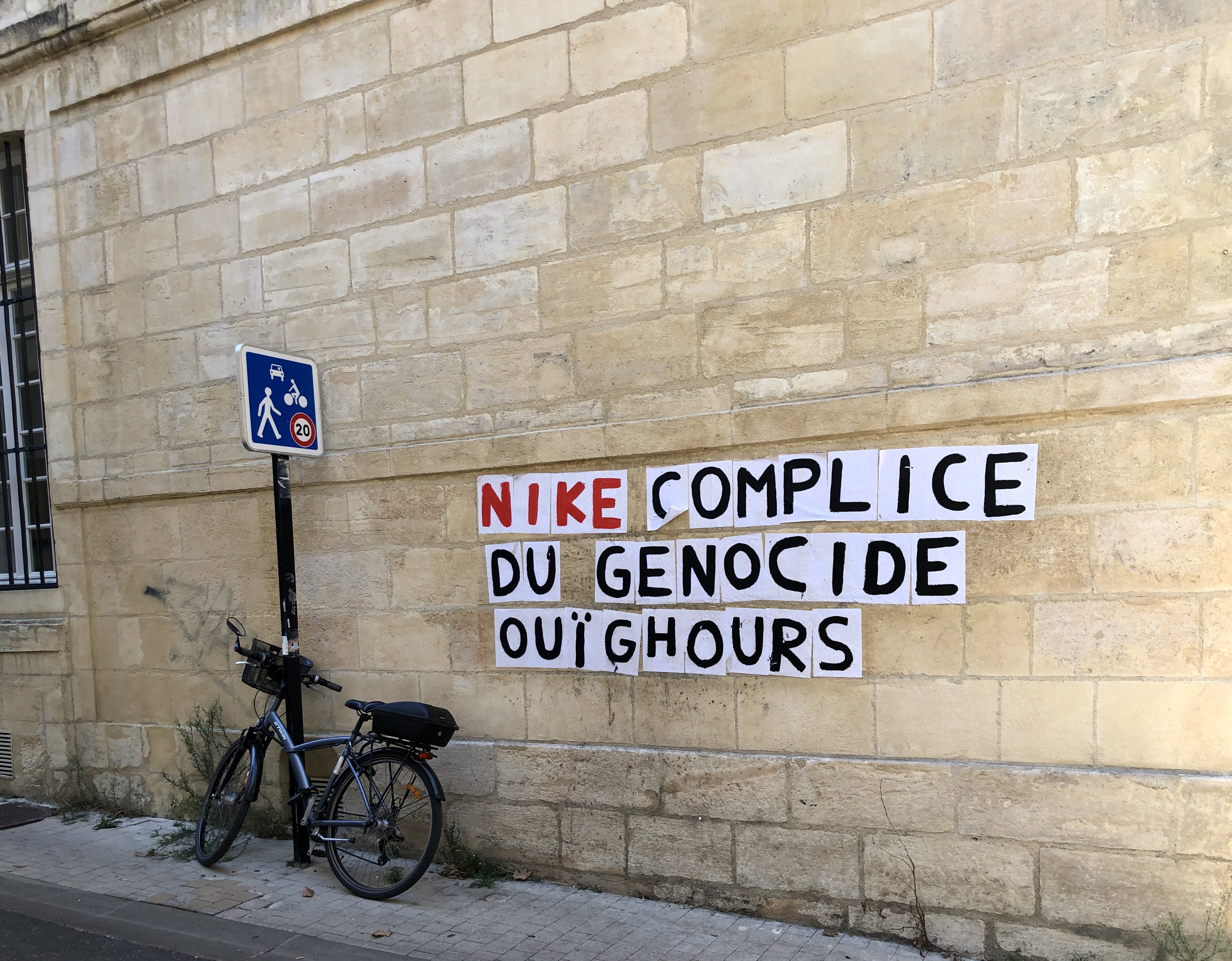
Posters in Bordeaux, France, accusing Nike of complicity in the Uyghur genocide.

The Chinese government is reported to have pressured foreign companies to reject claims of abuses. Apple was asked by the Chinese government to censor Uyghur-related news apps, among others, on its devices sold in China. Companies such as Nike and Adidas were boycotted in China after they criticized the treatment of Uyghurs, which resulted in significant drop in sales.

==== Medical experiments ====
Former inmates have said that they were subjected to medical experimentation.

==== Organized mass rape and sexual torture ====
From 2019 to 2021, BBC News and other sources reported accounts of organized mass rape and sexual torture carried out by Chinese authorities in the re-education camps.

Multiple women who were formerly detained in the Xinjiang re-education camps have publicly made accusations of systemic sexual abuse, including rape, gang rape, and sexual torture, such as forced vaginal and anal penetrations with electric batons, and rubbing chili pepper paste on genitals. Sayragul Sauytbay, a teacher who was forced to work in the camps, told the BBC that employees of the re-education camp in which she was detained conducted rapes en masse, saying that camp guards "picked the girls and young women they wanted and took them away". She also told the BBC of an organized gang rape, in which a woman around age 21 was forced to make a confession in front of a crowd of 100 other women detained in the camps, before being raped by multiple policemen in front of the assembled crowd. In 2018, a Globe and Mail interview with Sauytbay indicated that she did not personally see violence at the camp, but did witness malnourishment and a complete lack of freedom. Tursunay Ziawudun, a woman who was detained in the re-education camps for a period of nine months, told the BBC that women were removed from their cells every night to be raped by Chinese men in masks and that she was subjected to three separate instances of gang rape while detained. In an earlier interview, Ziawudun reported that while she "wasn't beaten or abused" while in the camps, she was instead subjected to long interrogations, forced to watch propaganda, had her hair cut, was under constant surveillance, and kept in cold conditions with poor food, leading to her developing anemia. Qelbinur Sedik, an Uzbek woman from Xinjiang, has stated that Chinese police sexually abused detainees during electric shock tortures, saying that "there were four kinds of electric shock... the chair, the glove, the helmet, and anal rape with a stick".

Chinese government officials deny all allegations that there have been any human rights abuses within the re-education camps. Reuters reported in March 2021 that Chinese government officials also disclosed personal medical information of women witnesses in an effort to discredit them.

In February 2021, the BBC released an extensive report which alleged that systematic sexual abuse was taking place within the camps. The gang rapes and sexual torture were alleged to be part of a systemic rape culture which included both policemen and those from outside the camps who pay for time with the prettiest girls. CNN reported in February 2021 about a worker and several former female inmates which survived the camps; they provided details about murder, torture and rape in the camps, which they described as routinely occurring.

=== Outside re-education camps ===
==== IUDs and birth control ====
China performs regular pregnancy checks on minority women within Xinjiang. Some CCP officials have spoken about the "demographic imbalance" in southern Xinjiang; Liu Yilei, deputy secretary-general of the Xinjiang Production and Construction Corps CCP Committee, said that the "proportion of the Han population in southern Xinjiang is too low, less than 15 percent. The problem of demographic imbalance is southern Xinjiang's core issue."

Zenz reported that 80% of "new" Chinese IUD placements (defined in his study as total IUD placements minus IUD removals) in 2018 occurred in Xinjiang, despite the region constituting only 1.8% of the country's population. Assessing Zenz's analysis, Xinjiang University Professor Lin Fangfei argued that the appropriate measure is that 8.7% of IUD operations were performed in Xinjiang, adding that the Uyghur population growth was bigger than the Han population growth in the region.

Zenz reported that birth rates in counties whose majority population consists of ethnic minorities began to fall in 2015, "the very year that the government began to single out the link between population growth and 'religious extremism'". Prior to the recent drops in birth rates, the Uyghur population had had a growth rate 2.6 times that of the Han between 2005 and 2015. According to Zenz's analysis of Chinese government documents, the Chinese government had planned to sterilize between 14% and 34% of childbearing-age married women in two predominantly Uyghur counties in 2019, while seeking to sterilize 80% of childbearing-age women in four rural prefectures in Xinjiang's south that are primarily inhabited by ethnic minorities.

According to a fax provided to CNN by the Xinjiang regional government, birth rates in Xinjiang fell by 32.68% from 2017 to 2018. In 2019, the birth rates fell by 24% year over year, a significantly greater drop than the 4.2% decline in births experienced across the entire People's Republic of China. According to Zenz, population growth rates in the two largest Uyghur prefectures in Xinjiang, Kashgar and Hotan, fell by 84% between 2015 and 2018.

According to Adrian Zenz, Chinese government documents mandate that birth control violations of Uyghurs are punishable by extrajudicial internment. Official records from Karakax County between 2017 and 2019 leaked to the Financial Times showed that the most common reason for detaining Uyghurs in camps was violation of family planning policies, with the second most common reason being for practising Islam. A 2018 Karakax government report said it had implemented "maximally strict family planning policies".

In 2020, an Associated Press investigation reported that forced birth control in Xinjiang was "far more widespread and systematic than previously known", and that Chinese authorities had forced IUD insertions, sterilization and abortions upon "hundreds of thousands" of Uyghur and other minority women. Many women stated that they were forced to receive contraceptive implants. The full scale of forced sterilization in Xinjiang is unknown, partly because of the Chinese government's failure to collect or share data, as well as the reluctance of victims to come forward due to stigma. The measures have been compared to China's past one-child policy targeting its Han population.

According to CNN, regional authorities do not dispute the decrease in birth rates but deny that genocide and forced sterilization is occurring; Xinjiang authorities maintain that the decrease in birth rates is due to "the comprehensive implementation of the family planning policy." The Chinese Embassy in the United States said the policy was positive and empowering for Uyghur women, writing that, "in the process of eradicating extremism, the minds of Uygur women were emancipated and gender equality and reproductive health were promoted, making them no longer baby-making machines. They are more confident and independent." Twitter removed the tweet for violating its policies.

==== Forced cohabitation, co-sleeping, rape, and abortion ====
Beginning in 2018, over one million Chinese government workers began forcibly living in the homes of Uyghur families to monitor and assess resistance to assimilation, as well as to watch for frowned-upon religious and cultural practices.

The "Pair Up and Become Family" program assigned Han Chinese men to monitor the homes of Uyghurs and sleep in the same beds as Uyghur women. According to Radio Free Asia, these Han Chinese government workers were trained to call themselves "relatives" and forcibly engaged in co-habitation of Uyghur homes for the purpose of promoting "ethnic unity". Radio Free Asia reports that these men "regularly sleep in the same beds as the wives of men detained in the region's internment camps." Chinese officials maintained that co-sleeping is acceptable, provided that a distance of one meter is maintained between the women and the "relative" assigned to the Uyghur home. Uyghur activists state that no such restraint takes place, citing pregnancy and forced marriage numbers, and name the program a campaign of "mass rape disguised as 'marriage'." Human Rights Watch has condemned the program as a "deeply invasive forced assimilation practice", while the World Uyghur Congress states that it represents the "total annihilation of the safety, security and well-being of family members."

A 37-year-old pregnant woman from the Xinjiang region said that she attempted to give up her Chinese citizenship to live in Kazakhstan but was told by the Chinese government that she needed to come back to China to complete the process. She alleges that officials seized the passports of her and her two children before coercing her into receiving an abortion to prevent her brother from being detained in a re-education camp.

==== Organ harvesting allegations and concerns ====
Ethan Gutmann states that organ harvesting from prisoners of conscience became prevalent when members of the Uyghur ethnic group were targeted in security crackdowns and "strike hard campaigns" during the 1990s. According to Gutmann, organ harvesting from Uyghur prisoners dropped off by 1999 with members of the Falun Gong religious group overtaking the Uyghurs as a source of organs.

In the 2010s, concerns about organ harvesting from Uyghurs resurfaced. According to a unanimous determination by the China Tribunal in May 2020, China has persecuted and medically tested Uyghurs. Its report expressed concerns that Uyghurs were vulnerable to being subjected to organ harvesting but did not yet have evidence of its occurrence. In November 2020, Gutmann told RFA that a former hospital in Aksu, China, which had been converted into a Xinjiang re-education camp, would allow local officials to streamline the organ harvesting process and provide a steady stream of harvested organs from Uyghurs. In a December 2020 Haaretz article, Gutmann stated he believed at least 25,000 people were being killed in Xinjiang for their organs each year, claiming that "fast lanes" had been created for the movement of organs in local airports, and crematoria had recently been built in the province in order to more easily dispose of victims' bodies.

In 2020, a Chinese woman alleged that Uyghurs were killed to provide halal organs for primarily Saudi customers. She also alleged that in one such instance in 2006, 37 Saudi clients received organs from killed Uyghurs at the Department of Liver Transplantation of Tianjin Taida Hospital. Dr. Enver Tohti, a former oncology surgeon in Xinjiang, thought the allegation was credible.

In June 2021, the Special Procedures of the United Nations Human Rights Council voiced concerns over having "received credible information that detainees from ethnic, linguistic or religious minorities may be forcibly subjected to blood tests and organ examinations such as ultrasound and x-rays, without their informed consent; while other prisoners are not required to undergo such examinations." The press release stated that UN's human rights experts "were extremely alarmed by reports of alleged 'organ harvesting' targeting minorities, including Falun Gong practitioners, Uyghurs, Tibetans, Muslims and Christians, in detention in China."

In July 2025, the Xinjiang Health Commission announced plans to expand the region's organ transplant centers from three to nine by 2030. Human rights experts and medical professionals expressed concerns, noting that Xinjiang's organ donation rate is 0.69 per million people, well below the national average of 4.6.

==== Forced labor ====
Throughout the COVID-19 pandemic, the Chinese government imposed forced labor conditions on Uyghurs. In January 2020, videos surfaced on Douyin showing large numbers of Uyghurs being placed into airplanes, trains, and busses for transportation to forced factory labor programs. In March 2020, the Chinese government was found to be using the Uyghur minority as forced sweatshop labor. According to a report published by the Australian Strategic Policy Institute (ASPI), no fewer than around 80,000 Uyghurs were forcibly removed from Xinjiang for purposes of forced labor in at least twenty-seven factories around China. According to the Business and Human Rights Resource Centre, a UK-based charity, corporations such as Abercrombie & Fitch, Adidas, Amazon, Apple, BMW, Fila, Gap, H&M, Inditex, Marks & Spencer, Nike, North Face, Puma, PVH, Samsung, and Uniqlo sourced from these factories. Over 570,000 Uyghurs are forced to pick cotton by hand in Xinjiang. According to an archived report from Nankai University, the Chinese forced labor system is designed to reduce Uyghur population density. In total, by 2021, the Chinese government had relocated more than 600,000 Uyghurs to industrial workplaces as a part of their forced labor programs.

A June 2025 report published by Global Rights Compliance found evidence linking 68 Western and international companies to forced labor in China's critical minerals industry, which is centered in the Xinjiang region. Xinjiang partly relies on forced labor transfer programs, which targets Uyghurs and other Turkic Muslim populations, and experts say Uyghurs are forcibly transferred to the mines or face punishment such as imprisonment, income loss, and harassment. Global Rights Compliance found 77 critical mineral sector companies operating in Xinjiang and identified 15 companies, including those outside China, actively sourcing from them. Some of the businesses had been flagged by the United Nations as being involved in state-run labor transfer programs. The report traced the XUAR mineral supply chains to various global brands, such as paint, thermos, aerospace, defense, nuclear tool, coffee, and soft drink companies. Regarding the report, spokesperson Lin Jian for the Ministry of Foreign Affairs of China responded that "China's Xinjiang has never forced anyone to transfer employment" and that it was a "complete lie" by "individual anti-China forces". He further added that individual organizations needed "to stop interfering in China's internal affairs under the guise of human rights and stop undermining Xinjiang's prosperity and stability."

Under the tenure of Ma Xingrui, the force labor programs have increasingly been tied to Xinjiang's international trade. Under Ma's tenure from 2021 to 2025, Xinjiang's exports to the United States, Canada, the United Kingdom, and the European Union increased by 465%, increasing by 71% from 2024 to 2025 alone.

=== Outside China ===
In 2016, there was a brief window of opportunity for Uyghurs with passports to leave China; many did so but had to leave relatives and children without passports behind. Many of these families have not been reunited.

China has been accused of coordinating efforts to coerce Uyghurs living overseas into returning to China, using family still in China to pressure members of the diaspora. Chinese officials dismiss the accusations as fabrications.

China's robust surveillance system extends overseas, with a special emphasis placed on monitoring the Uyghur diaspora. According to the MIT Technology Review "China's hacking of Uyghurs is so aggressive that it is effectively global, extending far beyond the country's own borders. It targets journalists, dissidents, and anyone who raises Beijing's suspicions of insufficient loyalty."

In March 2021 Facebook reported that hackers based in China had been conducting cyberespionage against members of the Uyghur diaspora.

Uyghurs in the United Arab Emirates, Egypt, Saudi Arabia and Turkey have been detained and deported back to China, sometimes separating families. CNN reported in June 2021 that "rights activists fear that even as Western nations take China to task over its treatment of Uyghurs, countries in the Middle East and beyond will increasingly be willing to acquiesce to its crackdown on members of the ethnic group at home and abroad." According to the Associated Press, "Dubai also has a history as a place where Uyghurs are interrogated and deported back to China."

A joint report from the Uyghur Human Rights Project and the Oxus Society for Central Asian Affairs found 1,546 cases of Uyghurs being detained and deported at the behest of Chinese authorities in 28 countries from 1997 to March 2021.

In 2025, reports emerged of Chinese passports containing false information issued by Chinese consulates to Uyghurs living abroad in order to create a pretext for deportation for possessing a "fake" passport.

From 2023, China quietly opened the borders of Xinjiang to allow visits from overseas Uyghurs. The policy change quickly became known within the Uyghur diaspora community. According to Zenz and Uyghur activist Muetter Tohti, a U.S. based Uyghur activist had told them that "while Uyghur Americans still concealed their trips in 2024 out of fear of criticism by other community members, by 2025, the practice had become normalized". Since the change in policies, even some formerly openly critical of China's policies have visited Xinjiang and abandoned their activism after they returned. Additionally, some residents of Xinjiang began to be allowed to travel abroad to see relatives. Some overseas Uyghurs who have returned to Xinjiang report being interrogated by the police, and being offered benefits for them and their familues in exchange for information about Uyghur communities abroad or agreeing to make propaganda for Xinjiang. According to Zenz and Tohti, China's "strategy of transnational co-optation is achieving what years of overt threats did not", as many in the Uyghur diaspora are willing to curb their criticism to be allowed to visit Xinjiang, meaning that "protests and advocacy has declined precipitously".

== Use of biometric and surveillance technology ==
Chinese authorities use biometric technology to track individuals. According to Yahir Imin, Chinese authorities drew his blood, scanned his face, recorded his fingerprints, and documented his voice. China collects genetic material from millions of Uyghurs. China uses facial recognition technology to sort people by ethnicity, and uses DNA to tell if an individual is a Uyghur. China has been accused of creating "technologies used for hunting people."

In 2017, security-related construction tripled in Xinjiang. Charles Rollet stated, "projects include not only security cameras but also video analytics hubs, intelligent monitoring systems, big data centers, police checkpoints, and even drones." Drone manufacturer DJI began providing surveillance drones to local police in 2017. According to ASPI, the Ministry of Public Security invested billions of dollars in two government plans: the Skynet project (天网工程) and the Sharp Eyes project (雪亮工程). These two projects attempted to use facial recognition to "resolutely achieve no blind spots, no gaps, no blank spots" by 2020. A report by ASPI highlighted Morgan Stanley's claim that, by 2020, 400 million surveillance cameras were to be operating. Chinese companies including SenseTime, CloudWalk, Yitu, Megvii, and Hikvision built algorithms to allow the Chinese government to track the Muslim minority group.

In July 2020, the United States Department of Commerce sanctioned 11 Chinese firms, including two subsidiaries of BGI Group, for violating the human rights of Uyghur Muslims, by exploiting their DNA. BGI Group along with Abu Dhabi-based AI and cloud computing firm Group 42 – accused of espionage in 2019 – were named by the US departments of Homeland Security and State in an October 2020 warning issued to Nevada against the use of the 200,000 COVID-19 test kits donated by UAE under the partnership of G42 and the BGI Group. US intelligence agencies warned foreign powers who were exploiting patients' medical samples to dig into their medical history, genetic traits, and illnesses.

=== Biometric data ===
While he was Xinjiang Party secretary, Chen Quanguo launched "Physicals for All", purportedly a medical care program. "Every Xinjiang resident between the ages of twelve and 65" was required to provide DNA samples. Also collected were data on "blood types, fingerprints, voice-prints, iris patterns". Officials in Tumxuk gathered hundreds of blood samples. Tumxuk was named a "major battlefield for Xinjiang's security work" by the state news media. In January 2018, a forensic DNA lab overseen by the Institute of Forensic Science of China was built there. Lab documents showed that it used software created by Thermo Fisher Scientific, a Massachusetts company. This software was used in correspondence to create genetic sequencers, helpful in analyzing DNA. In response, Thermo Fisher declared in February that it would cease sales to the Xinjiang region as a result of "fact-specific assessments".

=== GPS tracking of cars ===
Security officials ordered residents in China's northwest region to install GPS tracking devices in their vehicles, allowing authorities to track their movements. Authorities said that it "is necessary to counteract the activities of Islamist extremists and separatists". An announcement from officials in Bayingolin Mongol Autonomous Prefecture proclaimed that "there is a severe threat from international terrorism, and cars have been used as a key means of transport for terrorists as well as constantly serving as weapons. It is, therefore, necessary to monitor and track all vehicles in the prefecture."

== Cultural effects ==
=== Mosques ===
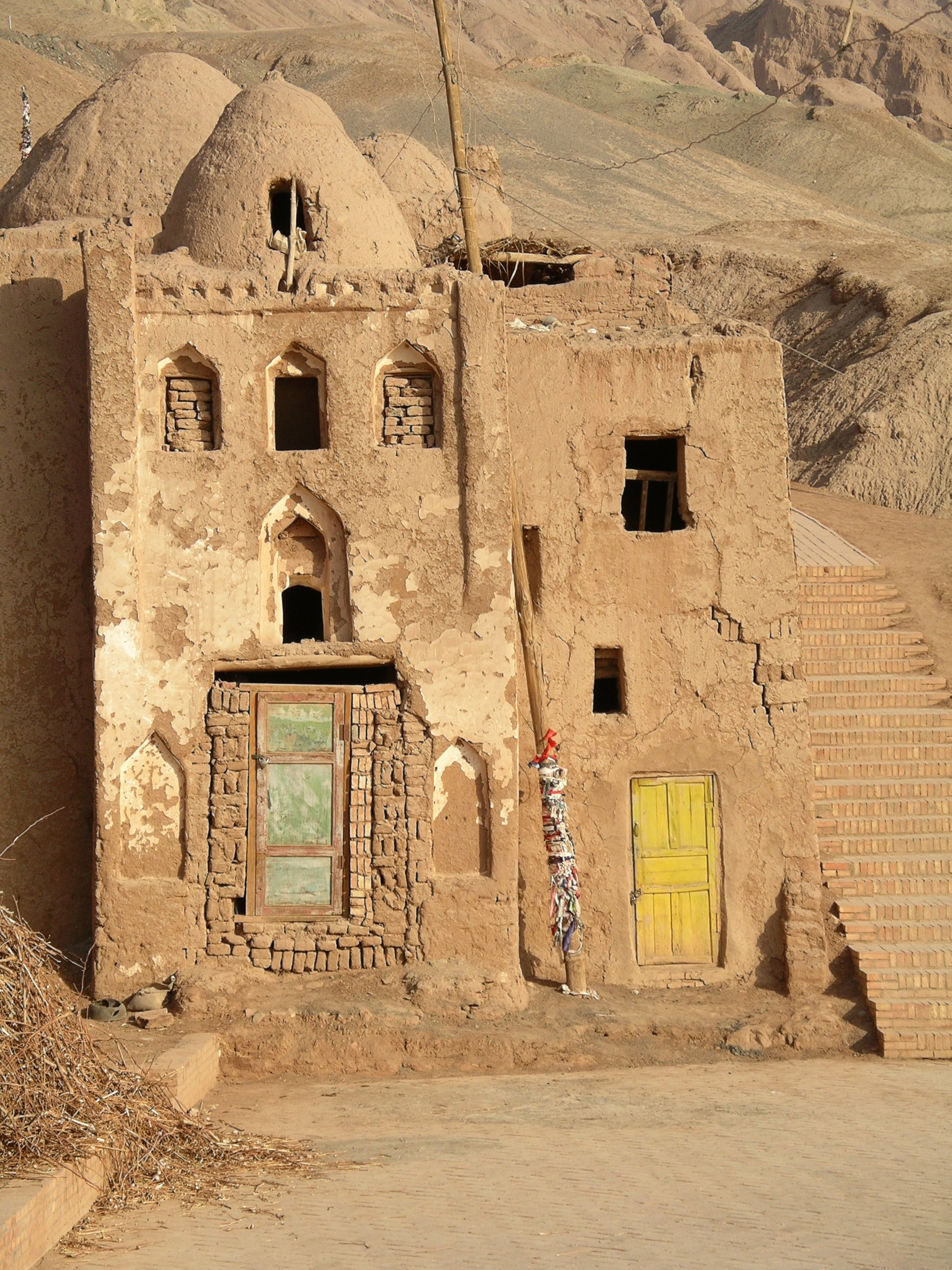
Mosque in Tuyoq, Xinjiang (2005)

Mosques, Muslim shrines, and cemeteries in Xinjiang have been the target of systematic destruction. In 2020, the Australian Strategic Policy Institute (ASPI) used satellite imagery of approximately 900 religious sites, to estimate that around 16,000 mosques may have been destroyed or damaged as a result of government policies since 2017, with minarets reportedly removed and "decorative features scrubbed away or painted over".

In 2005, Human Rights Watch reported that "information scattered in official sources suggests that retaliation" against mosques not sponsored by the Chinese state was prevalent and that the Xinjiang Party Secretary expressed that Uyghurs "should not have to build new places for religious activities". The Chinese government prohibited minors from participating in religious activities in Xinjiang in a manner that, according to Human Rights Watch, "has no basis in Chinese law".

According to an analysis from The Guardian, over one-third of mosques and religious sites in China suffered "significant structural damage" between 2016 and 2018, with nearly one-sixth of all mosques and shrines completely razed. This included the tomb of Imam Asim, a mud tomb in the Taklamakan Desert, and the Ordam shrine at the mazar of Ali Arslan Khan. According to The Guardian, Uyghur Muslims believe that repeated pilgrimages to these tombs fulfill a Muslim's obligation to complete the Hajj. A 2018 ABC News report stated that there was "systematic repression and imprisonment of the Muslim Uighur minority in Xinjiang", and that the "destruction of cultural and religiously significant Islamic buildings" in the region may have been formed as part of this ongoing repression. In 2019, Bellingcat, in response to allegations made on Twitter regarding the destruction of mosques in China, published a report that stated that Keriya Aitika Mosque appeared to be "razed" based on the images posted on Google Earth, while noting it was unclear at the time whether the Kargilik Mosque had been demolished. In the same year, Indonesian scholar Said Aqil Siradj disputed that Uyghurs faced persecution, saying there was an increasing number of mosques being built and repaired in Xinjiang.

Id Kah Mosque in Xinjiang is China's largest. Radio Free Asia reported that in 2018, a plaque containing Quranic scriptures, that had long hung outside the front entrance of the mosque, had been removed by the authorities. Turghunjan Alawudun, director of the World Uyghur Congress, said the plaque was removed as "one aspect of the Chinese regime's evil policies meant to eliminate the Islamic faith among Uyghurs... and Uyghurs themselves". Anna Fifield of The Independent wrote in 2020 that Kashgar no longer had any working mosques. The Globe and Mail reported that the only services at the Id Kah mosque, which had been turned into a tourist attraction, were staged to give foreign visitors the impression that religion was being practiced freely and that mosque attendance numbered only in the dozens. Indonesian outlet Antara released a video in 2021 documenting that 800 worshipers were in the mosque for Ramadan, but also that there was no iftar ritual due to pandemic restrictions.

Radio Free Asia reported that starting from early 2020, in response to international criticism, Chinese authorities started limited easing of religious restrictions in Xinjiang, reopening some mosques that were closed down. However, the broadcaster said that most Uyghurs had not returned to the mosques, fearful of their experiences in the previous crackdowns, and that Hui Muslims were given greater leeway than Uyghur Muslims.

During a visit to Xinjiang in 2023, a Malaysian delegation of reporters and youth association representatives met with Abdureqip Tormurniyaz, the head of the Xinjiang Islamic Institute in Ürümqi. Abdureqip showed them the mosque at the campus where students would be taught to lead prayers and carry out other Islamic tasks. He added that there were 8 other branches of the institute across Xinjiang with freedom accorded to practice religion and graduates being well-prepared to become imams or religious teachers. Bernama noted that the perception from the visit was in sharp contrast to Western criticism of Uyghurs being religiously persecuted.

=== Education ===
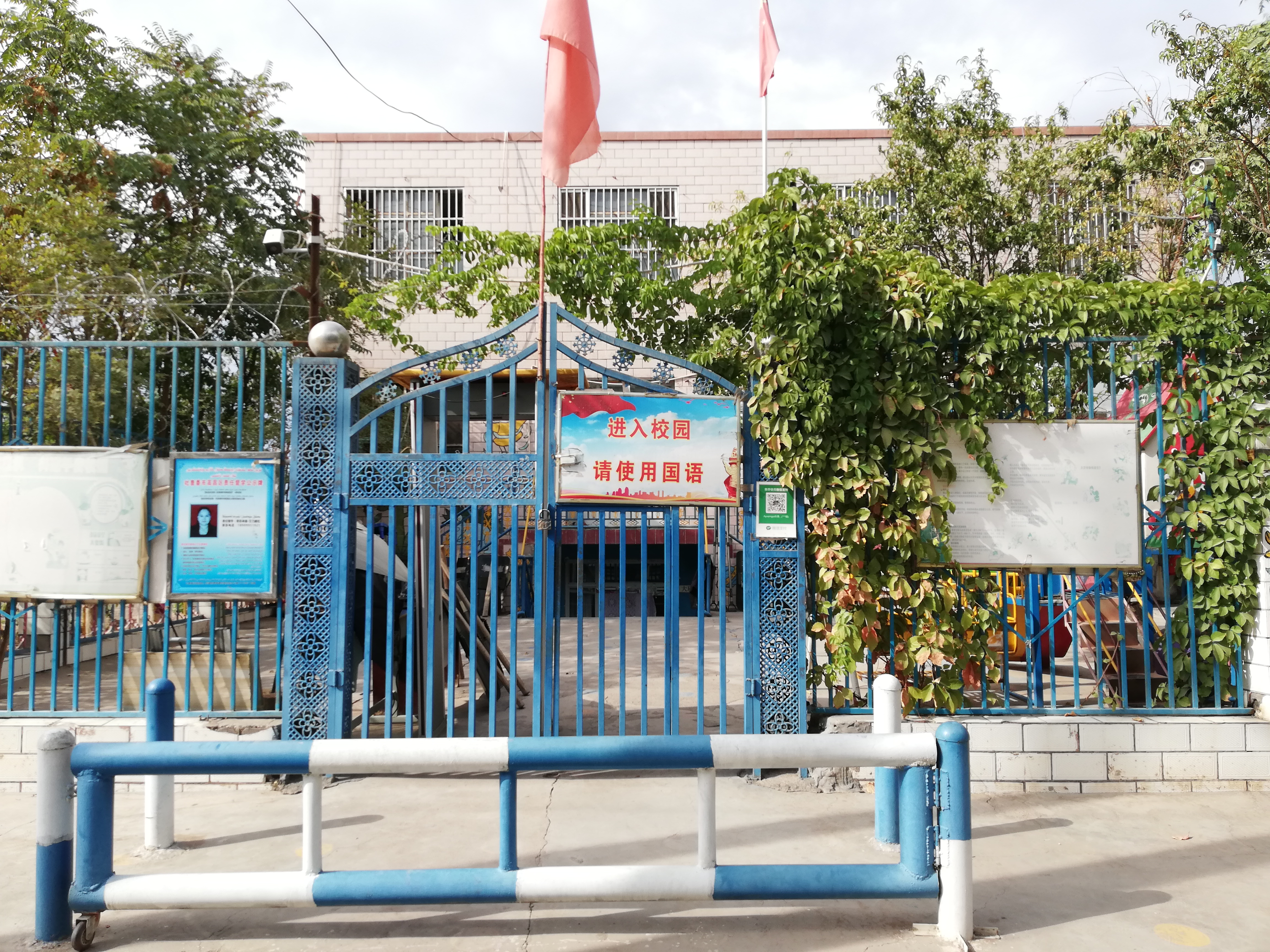
Entrance to a school in Turpan, a Uyghur-majority city in Xinjiang, in 2018. The sign at the gate, written in Chinese, reads: "[You are] entering the school grounds. Please speak the national language [i.e. Mandarin Chinese]

In 2011, schools in Xinjiang transitioned to what officials called a policy of bilingual education. The primary medium of instruction is Standard Chinese, with only a few hours a week devoted to Uyghur literature. Despite this policy, few Han children are taught to speak Uyghur.

Uyghur students are increasingly attending residential schools far from their home communities where they cannot speak Uyghur. According to a 2020 report from Radio Free Asia (RFA), monolingual Chinese language education has been introduced in an influential high school in Kashgar that formerly provided bilingual education.

Sayragul Sauytbay described how she was forced to teach at a re-education camp, saying the camp was "cramped and unhygienic" with her detainee students given only basic sustenance. Sauytbay added that authorities forced the detainees to learn Chinese, sit through indoctrination classes, and make public confessions.

In 2021, the standard Uyghur language textbooks used in Xinjiang since the early 2000s were outlawed and their authors and editors sentenced to death or life imprisonment on separatism charges. The textbooks had been created and approved by relevant government officials; however, according to the AP in 2021, the Chinese government said that the "2003 and 2009 editions of the textbooks contained 84 passages preaching ethnic separatism, violence, terrorism and religious extremism and that several people were inspired by the books to participate in a bloody anti-government riot in the regional capital Urumqi in 2009".

=== Detained academics and religious figures ===
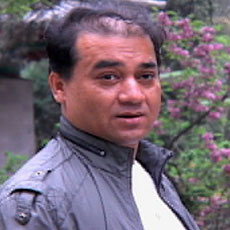
Uyghur economist Ilham Tohti

In 2019 the Uyghur Human Rights Project identified 386 Uyghur intellectuals who had been imprisoned, detained, or disappeared since early 2017.

Uyghur economist Ilham Tohti was sentenced to life in prison in 2014. Amnesty International called his sentence unjustified and deplorable. Rahile Dawut, a prominent Uyghur anthropologist who studied and preserved Islamic shrines, traditional songs, and folklore, disappeared.

RFA reported that the Chinese government jailed Uyghur Imam Abduheber Ahmet after he took his son to a religious school not sanctioned by the state. They reported that Ahmet had previously been lauded by China as a "five-star" imam but was sentenced in 2018 to over five years in prison for his action.

=== Cemeteries ===
In September 2019, Agence France-Presse (AFP) visited 13 destroyed cemeteries across four cities and witnessed exposed bones remaining in four of them. Through an examination of satellite images, the press agency determined that the grave destruction campaign had been ongoing for more than a decade. According to a previous AFP report, three cemeteries in Xayar County were among dozens of Uyghur cemeteries destroyed in Xinjiang between 2017 and 2019. The unearthed human bones from the cemeteries in Xayar County were discarded. In January 2020, a CNN report based on an analysis of Google Maps satellite imagery said that Chinese authorities had destroyed more than 100 graveyards in Xinjiang, primarily Uyghur ones. CNN linked the destruction of the cemeteries to the government's campaign to control the Uyghurs and Muslims more broadly. The Chinese government claimed that the cemetery and tomb destruction were relocations due to lack of maintenance and that the dead were re-interred in new standardized cemeteries.

This is all part of China's campaign to effectively eradicate any evidence of who we are, to effectively make us like the Han Chinese. ... That's why they're destroying all of these historical sites, these cemeteries, to disconnect us from our history, from our fathers and our ancestors.

— Salih Hudayar, whose great-grandparents' graveyard was demolished

Among the destroyed cemeteries is Sultanim Cemetery (37°07′02″N 79°56′04″E), the central Uyghur historical graveyard with generations of burials, and the most sacred shrine in Hotan city, which was demolished and converted into a parking lot between 2018 and 2019. China Global Television Network (CGTN), a Chinese state-owned international channel affiliated with the Chinese Communist Party, said that the graves were relocated.

=== Marriage ===
According to American journalist Leta Hong Fincher, the Chinese government offered Uyghur couples incentives to have fewer children, and for women to marry non-Uyghurs. According to the outreach coordinator for the U.S.-based Uyghur Human Rights Project, Zubayra Shamseden, the Chinese government "wants to erase Uighur culture and identity by remaking its women."

Marriages between Uyghurs and Han are encouraged with government subsidies. In August 2014, local authorities in Cherchen County (Qiemo County) announced, "Incentive Measures Encouraging Uighur-Chinese Intermarriage", including a 10,000 CNY (US$1,450) cash reward per annum for the first five years to such intermarried couples as well as preferential treatment in employment and housing plus free education for the couples, their parents and offspring. County CCP Secretary Zhu Xin remarked:

Our advocacy of intermarriage is promoting positive energy ... Only by promoting the establishment of a social structure, and community environment in which all ethnic groups are embedded in each other ... can we boost the great unity, ethnic fusion, and development of all ethnic groups in Xinjiang, and finally realize our China dream of the great rejuvenation of our Chinese nation

In October 2017, the marriage of a Han man from Henan Province to a Uyghur woman from Lop County was celebrated on the county's social media page:

They will let ethnic unity forever bloom in their hearts,
Let ethnic unity become one's own flesh and blood.

University of Washington anthropologist and China expert Darren Byler said that a social media campaign in 2020 to marry off 100 Uyghur women to Han men indicated that "a certain racialized power dynamic is a part of this process", commenting, "It does seem as though this is an effort to produce greater assimilation and diminish ethnic difference by pulling Uighurs into Han-dominated relationships."

According to RFA reports, in March 2017 Salamet Memetimin, an ethnic Uyghur and the Communist Party Secretary for Chaka township's Bekchan village in Qira County, Hotan Prefecture, was relieved of her duties for taking her nikah marriage vows at her home. In interviews with RFA in 2020, residents and officials of Shufu County (Kona Sheher), Kashgar Prefecture (Kashi) stated that it was no longer possible to perform traditional Uyghur nikah marriage rites in the county.

=== Clothing ===
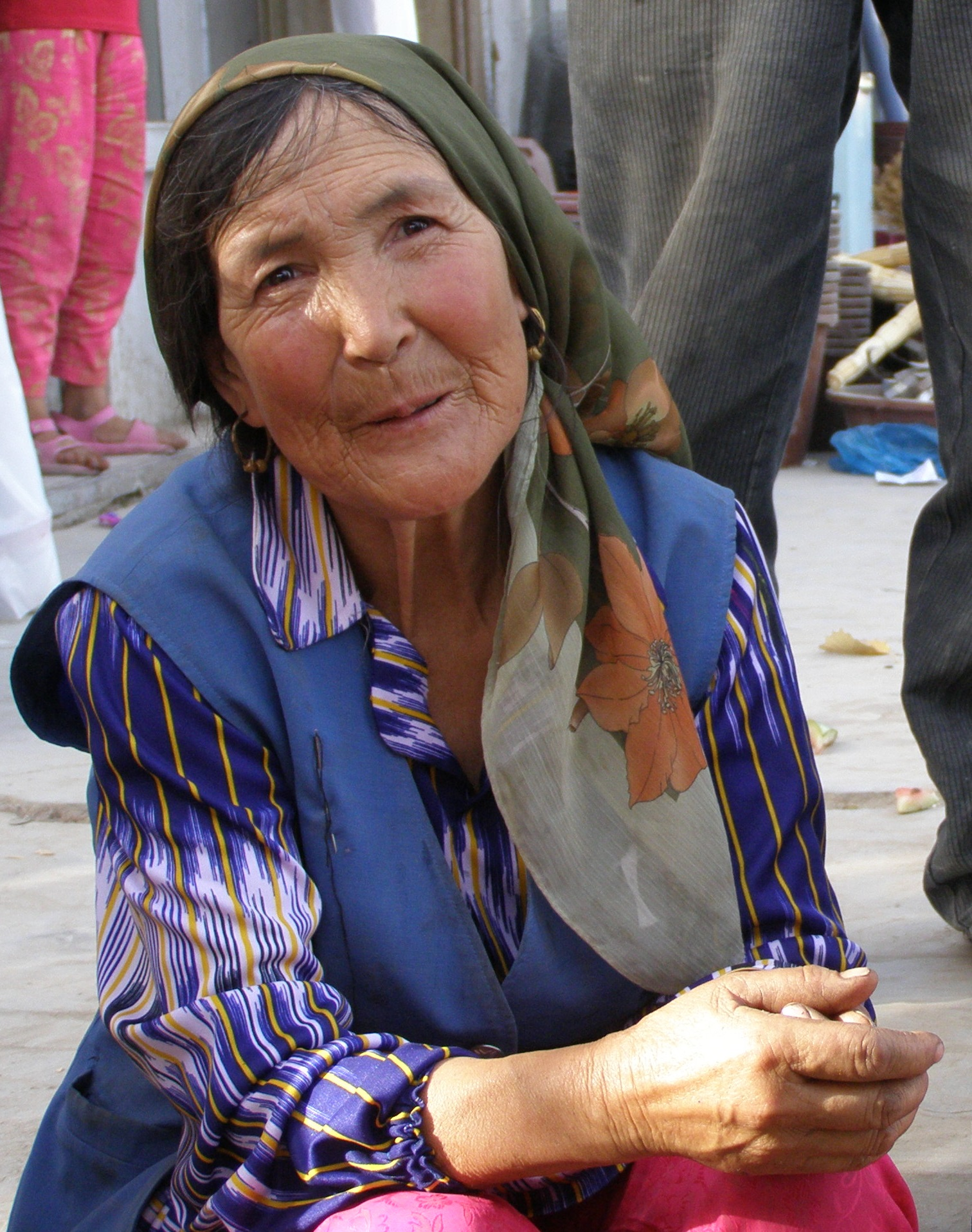
A Uyghur woman wearing a hijab in Xinjiang

Chinese authorities discourage the wearing of headscarves, veils, and other customary Islamic attire. On 20 May 2014, a protest broke out in Alakaga (Alaqagha, Alahage), Kuqa (Kuchar, Kuche), Aksu Prefecture when 25 women and schoolgirls were detained for wearing headscarves. According to a local official, two died and five were injured when police fired on protesters. Subsequently, a Washington Post team was detained in Alakaga and ultimately deported from the region.

Documents leaked from the Xinjiang re-education camps have noted that some inmates have been detained for wearing traditional clothing.

=== Naming ===
==== Children's names ====
RFA reported that in 2015, a list of banned names for children called "Naming Rules for Ethnic Minorities", was promulgated in Hotan, banning potential names including "Islam", "Quran", "Mecca", "Jihad", "Imam", "Saddam", "Hajj", and "Medina". Use of the list was later extended throughout Xinjiang. Legislation in 2017 made it illegal to give children names that the Chinese government deemed to "exaggerate religious fervor". This prohibition included a ban on naming children "Muhammad".

==== Village Names ====
A report by NGOs Human Rights Watch and Uyghur Hjelp found that 630 villages in Xinjiang were renamed to reflect Communist party ideology and remove religious and cultural references. Examples include Aq Meschit ("white mosque") village being renamed to Unity village and Dutar village being renamed to Red Flag village.

Commenting on the renaming, founder of Uyghur Hjelp, Abduweli Ayup, said that the Chinese government wants to "erase people's historical memory, because those names remind people of who they are".

Acting China director at Human Rights Watch, Maya Wang, said that "The Chinese authorities have been changing hundreds of village names in Xinjiang from those rich in meaning for Uyghurs to those that reflect government propaganda [...] These name changes appear part of Chinese government efforts to erase the cultural and religious expressions of Uyghurs."

== Classification of abuses ==
Special purpose tribunals, scholars, commentators, journalists, governments, politicians, and diplomats from many countries have labeled China's actions variously as genocide, cultural genocide, ethnocide, settler colonialism, and/or crimes against humanity.

=== Ethnocide or cultural genocide ===
In 2008, Michael E. Clarke, an Australian terrorism scholar, noted that "there has emerged within the Uighur émigré community a tendency to portray the Uighurs as experiencing a form of 'cultural genocide'", citing as an example a 2004 speech by World Uyghur Congress president Erkin Alptekin. In a 2012 Wall Street Journal op-ed, Uyghur activist Rebiya Kadeer described the CCP following "policies of Uighur cultural genocide". In 2018, UCL human rights scholar Kate Cronin-Furman argued that the Chinese state policies constituted cultural genocide.

In July 2019, German academic Adrian Zenz wrote in the Journal of Political Risk that the situation in Xinjiang constituted a cultural genocide; his research was later cited by BBC News and other news organizations. James Leibold, a professor at Australia's La Trobe University, called that same month the treatment of Uyghurs by the Chinese government a "cultural genocide", and stated that "in their own words, party officials are 'washing brains' and 'cleansing hearts' to 'cure' those bewitched by extremist thoughts." The term was used in editorials, such as in The Washington Post, at this point.

Since the release of the Xinjiang papers and the China Cables in November 2019, various journalists and researchers have called the Chinese government's treatment of Uyghurs an ethnocide or a cultural genocide. In November 2019, Zenz described the classified documents as confirming "that this is a form of cultural genocide". Foreign Policy published an article by Azeem Ibrahim (Note: Azeem Ibrahim is a Research Professor at the Strategic Studies Institute, US Army War College.) in which he called the Chinese treatment of Uyghurs a "deliberate and calculated campaign of cultural genocide" after the release of the Xinjiang papers and China Cables.

In 2020, academic Joanne Smith Finley wrote that scholars, commentators, and lawyers had been increasingly referring to the human rights situation in Xinjiang as a genocide, rather than a cultural genocide. Academic Barry Sautman states that the "contrast between genocidal mass murder and cultural dismantlement led to rejection of including cultural genocide in the Convention."

=== Genocide ===
In April 2019, Cornell University anthropologist Magnus Fiskesjö wrote in Inside Higher Ed that mass arrests of ethnic minority academics and intellectuals in Xinjiang indicated that "the Chinese regime's current campaign against the native Uighur, Kazakh and other peoples is already a genocide." Later, in 2020, Fiskejö wrote in academic journal Monde Chinois that "[t]he evidence for genocide is thus already massive, and must, at the very least, be regarded as sufficient for prosecution under international law... the number of competent authorities around the world concurring that this is indeed genocide are increasing."

In June 2020, after an Associated Press investigation found that Uyghurs were being subjected to mass forced sterilizations and forced abortions in Xinjiang, scholars increasingly have referred to the abuses in Xinjiang as a genocide.

In July 2020, Zenz said an interview with National Public Radio (NPR) that he had previously argued that the actions of the Chinese government are a cultural genocide, not a "literal genocide", but that one of the five criteria from the Genocide Convention was satisfied by more recent developments concerning the suppression of birth rates so "we do need to probably call it a genocide". The same month, law professor Ryszard Piotrowicz likewise wrote that the sterilization of Uyghur women and children constituted genocide under the 1948 Convention. Chris Patten, the last colonial governor of British Hong Kong, said that the "birth control campaign" was "arguably something that comes within the terms of the UN views on sorts of genocide".

Although China is not a member of the International Criminal Court, on 6 July 2020 the self-proclaimed East Turkistan Government-in-Exile and the East Turkistan National Awakening Movement filed a complaint with the ICC calling for it to investigate Chinese officials for crimes against Uyghurs including allegations of genocide. The ICC responded in December 2020 and "asked for more evidence before it will be willing to open an investigation into claims of genocide against Uighur people by China, but has said it will keep the file open for such further evidence to be submitted."

An August 2020 Quartz article reported that some scholars hesitate to label the human rights abuses in Xinjiang as a "full-blown genocide", preferring the term "cultural genocide", but that increasingly many experts were calling them "crimes against humanity" or "genocide". In August 2020 the spokesperson for Joe Biden's presidential campaign described China's actions as genocide.

In October 2020, the U.S. Senate introduced a bipartisan resolution designating the human rights abuses perpetrated by the Chinese government against the Uyghur people and other ethnic minorities in Xinjiang as genocide. Around the same time, the House of Commons of Canada issued a statement that its Subcommittee on International Human Rights of the Standing Committee on Foreign Affairs and International Development was persuaded that the Chinese Communist Party's actions in Xinjiang constitute genocide as laid out in the Genocide Convention. The 2020 annual report by the Congressional-Executive Commission on China referred to the Chinese government's treatment of Uyghurs as "crimes against humanity and possibly genocide."

In January 2021, U.S. secretary of state Mike Pompeo officially declared that China was committing genocide against the Uyghurs and other ethnic minorities living in Xinjiang. This declaration, which came in the final hours of the Trump administration, had not been made earlier due to a worry that it could disrupt trade talks between the US and China. On the allegations of crimes against humanity, which Pompeo asserted were ongoing and included the "arbitrary imprisonment or other severe deprivation of physical liberty of more than one million civilians, forced sterilization, torture of a large number of those arbitrarily detained, forced labor and the imposition of draconian restrictions on freedom of religion or belief, freedom of expression and freedom of movement."

On 19 January 2021, incoming U.S. president Joe Biden's secretary of state nominee Antony Blinken was asked during his confirmation hearings whether he agreed with Pompeo's conclusion that the CCP had committed genocide against the Uyghurs, he contended "That would be my judgment as well." During her confirmation hearings Joe Biden's nominee to be the US ambassador to the United Nations Linda Thomas-Greenfield stated that she believed what was currently happening in Xinjiang was a genocide, adding "I lived through and experienced and witnessed a genocide in Rwanda."

The US designation was followed by Canada's House of Commons and the Dutch parliament, each passing a non-binding motion in February 2021 to recognize China's actions as genocide.

In January 2021, the United States Holocaust Memorial Museum initially stated that, "[t]here is a reasonable basis to believe that the government of China is committing crimes against humanity." In November 2021, the museum revised its stance, stating the "Chinese government may be committing genocide against the Uyghurs."

In February 2021, a legal opinion released by the Essex Court Chambers concluded that "there is a very credible case that acts carried out by the Chinese government against the Uighur people in Xinjiang Uighur Autonomous Region amount to crimes against humanity and the crime of genocide, and describes how the minority group has been subject to "enslavement, torture, rape, enforced sterilisation and persecution." "Victims have been "forced to remain in stress positions for an extended period of time, beaten, deprived of food, shackled and blindfolded", it said. The legal team stated that they had seen "prolific credible evidence" of sterilisation procedures carried out on women, including forced abortions, saying the human rights abuses "clearly constitute a form of genocidal conduct". The opinion identified three Chinese officials – President Xi, Chen Quanguo and Zhu Hailun – with whom the authors believed there was a "plausible" case that personal responsibility for the genocide lay.

On 13 February 2021, The Economist wrote that while China's treatment and persecution of Uyghurs is "horrific" and a crime against humanity, "genocide" is the wrong word for China's actions due to China not engaging in mass murder.

According to a March 2021 New Lines Institute report that was written by over 50 global China, genocide, and international law experts, the Chinese government breached every article in the Genocide Convention, writing, "China's long-established, publicly and repeatedly declared, specifically targeted, systematically implemented, and fully resourced policy and practice toward the Uyghur group is inseparable from 'the intent to destroy in whole or in part' the Uyghur group as such." The report cited credible reports of mass deaths under the mass internment drive, while Uighur leaders were selectively sentenced to death or long-term imprisonment. "Uyghurs are suffering from systematic torture and cruel, inhumane, and degrading treatment, including rape, sexual abuse, and public humiliation, both inside and outside the camps", the report stated. The report argued that these policies are directly orchestrated by the highest levels of state, including Xi and the top officials of the Chinese Communist Party in Xinjiang. It also reported that the Chinese government gave explicit orders to "eradicate tumours", "wipe them out completely", "destroy them root and branch", "round up everyone", and "show absolutely no mercy", in regards to Uyghurs, and that camp guards reportedly follow orders to uphold the system in place until "Kazakhs, Uyghurs, and other Muslim nationalities, would disappear...until all Muslim nationalities would be extinct". According to the report "Internment camps contain designated "interrogation rooms" where Uyghur detainees are subjected to consistent and brutal torture methods, including beatings with metal prods, electric shocks, and whips."

In April 2021, Human Rights Watch released a report labelling human rights abuses against Uyghurs in Xinjiang as crimes against humanity. While acknowledging the genocide determinations made by various countries, they also mentioned that they had "not documented the existence of the necessary genocidal intent at this time" but that "nothing in this report precludes such a finding and, if such evidence were to emerge, the acts being committed against Turkic Muslims in Xinjiang—a group protected by the 1948 Genocide Convention—could also support a finding of genocide.".

In June 2021, the Canadian Anthropology Society issued a statement on Xinjiang in which the organization stated, "expert testimony and witnessing, and irrefutable evidence from the Chinese Government's own satellite imagery, documents, and eyewitness reports, overwhelmingly confirms the scale of the genocide."

In June 2021, The New York Times and ProPublica published their analysis of over 3,000 videos, concluding that after the January 2021 U.S. declaration that China was committing genocide in Xinjiang, the Chinese government started an influence campaign featuring thousands of videos of Chinese citizens denying genocide and abuses in Xinjiang on Twitter and YouTube. In August 2022, the U.S. State Department published a report PRC Efforts to Manipulate Global Public Opinion on Xinjiang on the Chinese government's global efforts "to discredit independent sources that report ongoing genocide and crimes against humanity" in Xinjiang.

In an article for Ethnic and Racial Studies, David Tobin characterized China's actions as a "genocide by attrition". He wrote that China's actions against the Uyghurs, including sexual abuse, mass internment and physical and mental torture, were calculated to destroy "the foundations of [Uyghur] life, language, religion, and inter-generational cultural transmission, resolving the “ethnic problem” through social death of Turkic Muslims".

The Uyghur Tribunal, a "people's tribunal" based in the United Kingdom, began to hold hearings in June 2021 to examine evidence in order to evaluate whether China's abuses against Uyghurs constitute genocide under the Genocide Convention. The tribunal was chaired by Geoffrey Nice, the lead prosecutor in the trial of Slobodan Milošević and chair of the previous China Tribunal, who announced the creation of the tribunal in September 2020. On 9 December 2021, the tribunal concluded that China has committed genocide against the Uyghurs via birth control and sterilization measures. The tribunal also found evidence of crimes against humanity, torture and sexual abuse. The tribunal's final determination does not legally bind any government to take action.

Academics Steve Tsang and Olivia Cheung wrote that their research found no evidence that Xi Jinping advocates genocide against Uyghurs. Tsang and Cheung conclude that China's policies subordinate identity based on culture, religion, or minority language in an effort to establish a national identity based on Han heritage, language, and Xi Jinping Thought.

=== Crimes against humanity ===
In June 2019, the China Tribunal, an independent judicial investigation into forced organ transplantation in China concluded that crimes against humanity had been committed beyond reasonable doubt against China's Uyghur Muslim and Falun Gong populations.

The Asia-Pacific Centre for the Responsibility to Protect at the University of Queensland concluded in November that evidence of atrocities in Xinjiang "likely meets the requirements of the following crimes against humanity: persecution, imprisonment, enforced disappearance, torture, forced sterilisation, and enslavement" and that "It is arguable that genocidal acts have occurred in Xinjiang, in particular acts of imposing measures to prevent births and forcible transfers." In December, lawyers David Matas and Sarah Teich wrote in Toronto Star that "One distressing present day example [of genocide] is the atrocities faced by the Uighur population in Xinjiang, China."

In 2021 the U.S. State Department's Office of the Legal Advisor concluded that although the situation in Xinjiang amounted to crimes against humanity, there was insufficient evidence to prove genocide. In 2026, the Office of the United Nations High Commissioner for Human Rights stated that China's policies toward the Uyghurs contain "coercive elements...so severe that they may amount to forcible transfer and/or enslavement as a crime against humanity."

=== Settler colonialism ===
In addition to other classifications, some academics and researchers have also termed the abuses as part of an ongoing project of Han settler colonialism.

=== View of discourse ===
Writing in 2023, academic and former UK diplomat Kerry Brown observes that the clash of labels between western and Chinese discourse on the issue of Xinjiang makes it nearly impossible to reach an empirical or neutral description of China's actions in Xinjiang.

According to American academic Darren Byler, discourses about Uyghurs in Xinjiang typically revolve around Uyghurs as either potential terrorists and resisters (from the view of the Chinese state) or objects of pity to be rescued (in western discourses), with little focus on Uyghurs as autonomous actors.

China contends that the Gaza war demonstrates the hypocrisy of Western criticisms of China's treatment of Uyghurs. According to this view, if Western countries were genuinely concerned about human rights, they would focus instead on the negative humanitarian impact of Israeli military operations in Gaza. Following a 2024 statement by U.S. Secretary of State Antony Blinken which equated the suffering of Muslims in Xinjiang with the suffering of Muslims in Gaza, the Chinese Foreign Ministry responded, "There is no conflict in Xinjiang, but the conflict is in the Gaza Strip. Muslims in Xinjiang are not suffering from hunger, expulsion, and killing, but the millions of Muslims in the Gaza Strip are suffering from hunger, expulsion, and killing. The US should stop playing double standards on human rights ..."

== International responses ==
=== United Nations ===
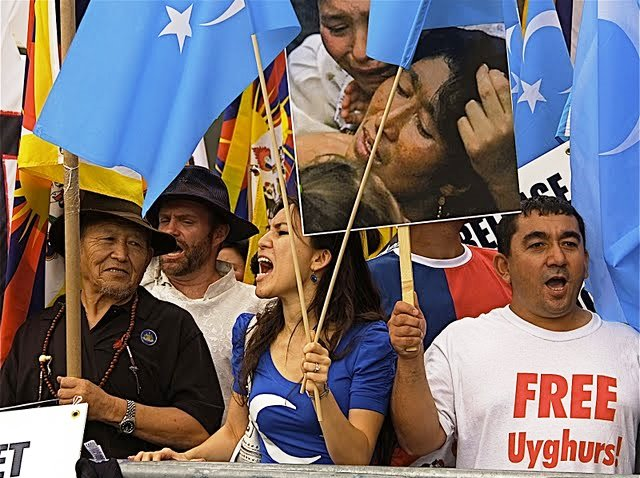
Protesters at the United Nations with the flag of East Turkestan

The UN High Commissioner for Human Rights (HCHR) began to discuss the possibility of a visit to Xinjiang with China in order to examine "the impact on human rights of its policies" in September 2020. China has turned down multiple requests from the UN HCHR to investigate the region. In May 2022, UN Human Rights High Commissioner Michelle Bachelet visited Xinjiang. In a statement released by the UN, Bachelet said that she raised concerns in Xinjiang about the broad application of counter-terrorism and de-radicalisation measures (including their impacts on Uyghurs and other Muslim minorities) and encouraged the government to review such policies to ensure they fully comply with international human rights standards. Bachelet stated that while she was unable to investigate the full scale of the vocational educational and training centres (VETC), she raised with the Chinese government concerns about the lack of independent judicial oversight for the program, and said that the government provided assurances that the VETC system had been dismantled. U.S. rights advocates criticized Bachelet's visit as a propaganda victory for Beijing, with some calling for her to resign.

On 31 August 2022, Bachelet released the UN Human Rights Office report on Xinjiang. The report found that China's treatment of these groups may amount to crimes against humanity. The report concludes that "serious human rights violations have been committed" in the province, which the report attributes to China's "application of counter-terrorism and counter-'extremism' strategies" targeting Uyghur Muslims and other Muslim minority groups. The report also said that "Allegations of patterns of torture or ill-treatment, including forced medical treatment and adverse conditions of detention, are credible, as are allegations of individual incidents of sexual and gender-based violence". China opposed the release of the report and claimed that it is based on "disinformation and lies".

=== Reactions by country ===
In December 2020, a case brought to the International Criminal Court was dismissed because the crimes alleged appeared to have been "committed solely by nationals of China within the territory of China, a State which is not a party to the Statute", meaning the ICC could not investigate them. In January 2021, the United States Department of State declared China's actions as genocide, and legislatures in several countries have passed non-binding motions doing the same, including the House of Commons of Canada, the Dutch parliament, the House of Commons of the United Kingdom, the Seimas of Lithuania, and the French National Assembly. Other parliaments, such as those in New Zealand, Belgium, and the Czech Republic condemned the Chinese government's treatment of Uyghurs as "severe human rights abuses" or crimes against humanity.

==== Multinational corporations ====
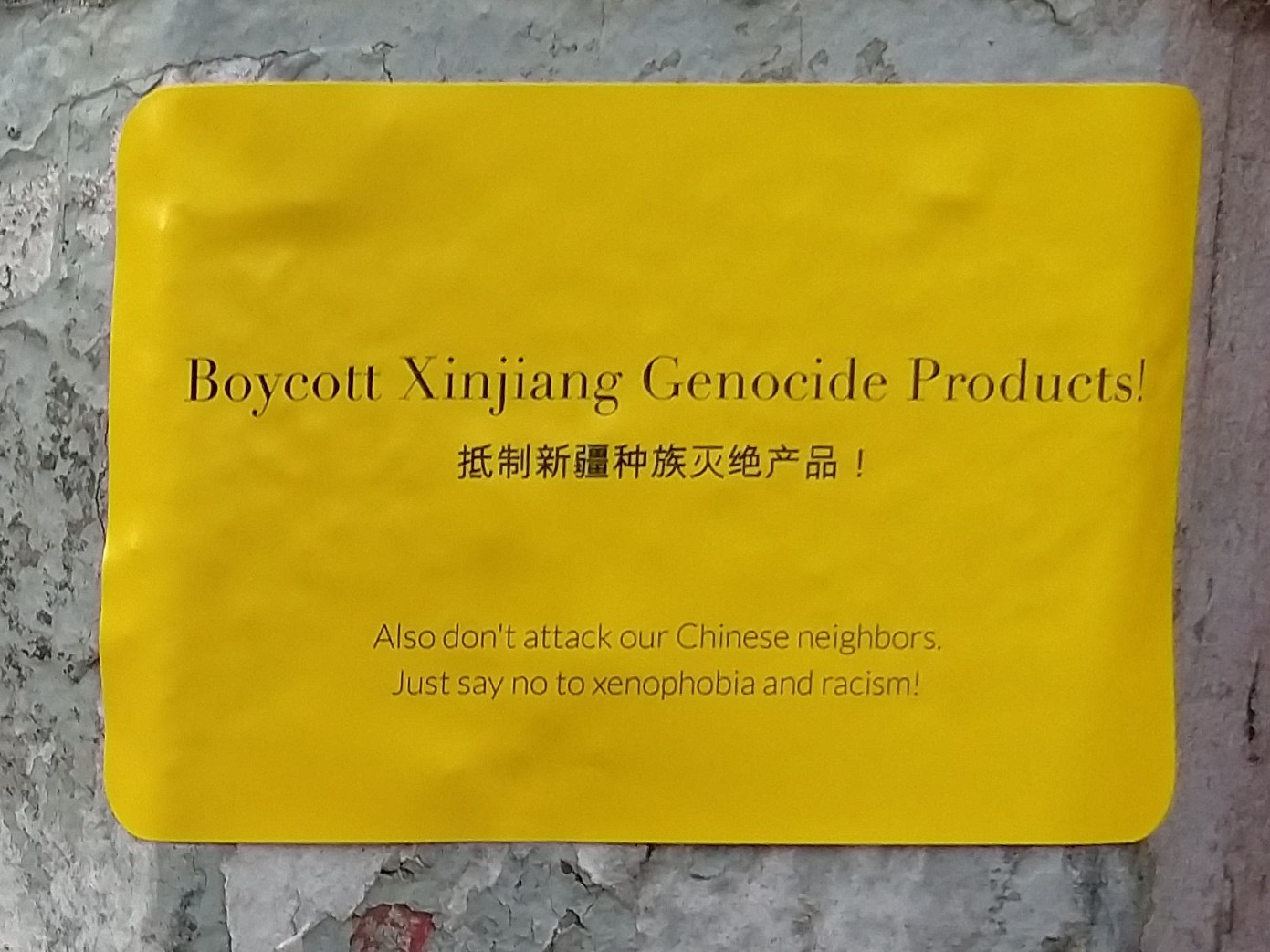
Xinjiang boycott advert on NYU's campus in New York, NY "Boycott Xinjiang Genocide Products!"

The proposed Uyghur Forced Labor Prevention Act in 2020 to would require the U.S. president to impose sanctions on "any foreign person who 'knowingly engages'" in forced labor of minority Muslims" and require firms to disclose their dealings with Xinjiang, In response, the president of the American Apparel & Footwear Association said that blanket import bans on cotton or other products from Xinjiang from such legislation would "wreak havoc" on legitimate supply chains in the apparel industry because Xinjiang cotton exports are often intermingled with cotton from other countries and there is no available origin-tracing technology for cotton fibers. On 22 September 2020, the US Chamber of Commerce issued a letter stating that the act "would prove ineffective and may hinder efforts to prevent human rights abuses." Major companies with supply chain ties to Xinjiang, including Apple Inc., Nike, Inc. and The Coca-Cola Company, have lobbied Congress to weaken the legislation and amend its provisions.

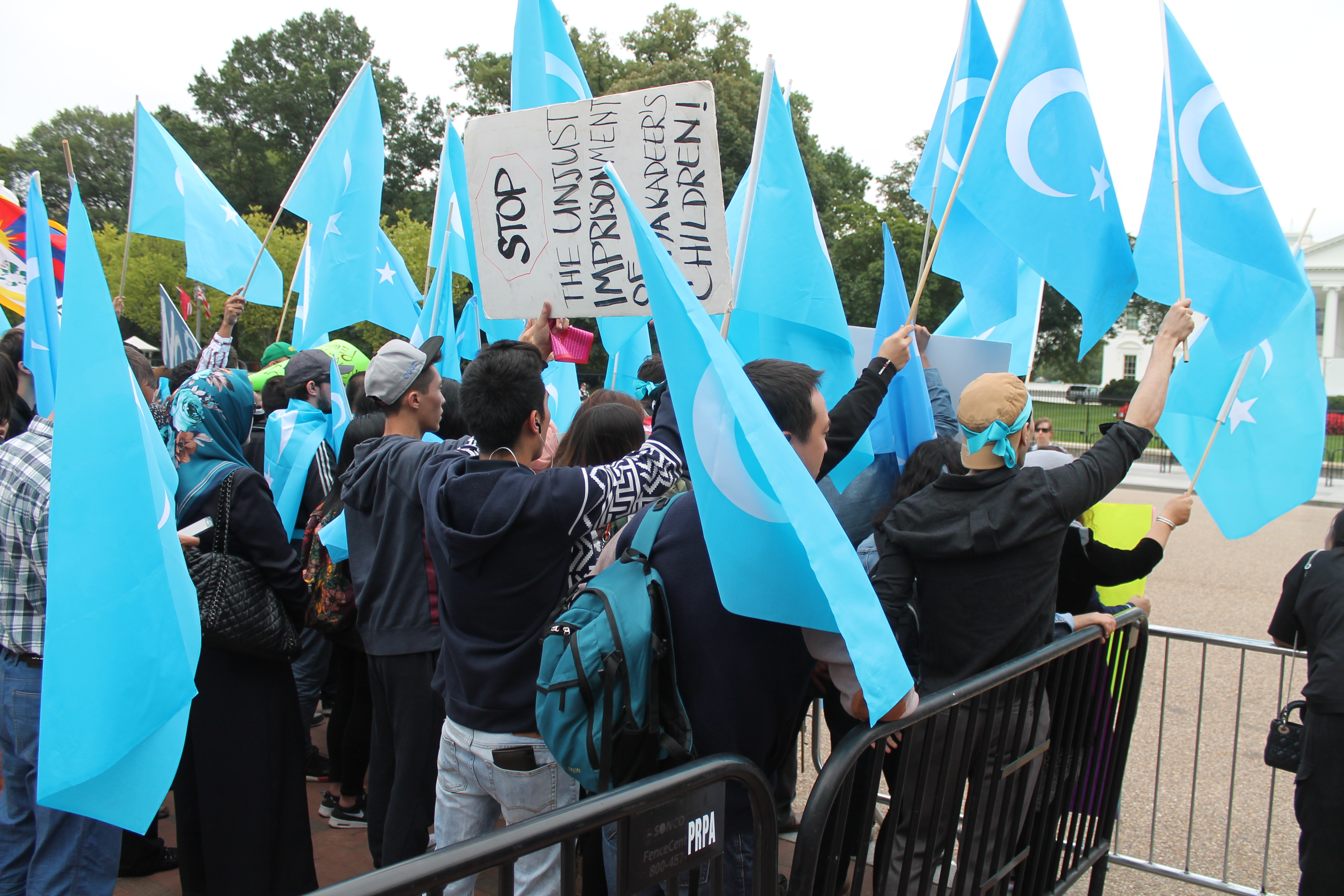
Uyghur human rights demonstration protest near the White House, on 25 September 2015

===== 2022 Winter Olympics diplomatic boycott =====
In the aftermath of the 2019 leak of the Xinjiang papers which made public Chinese policies towards the Uyghurs, calls were made for a boycott of the 2022 Winter Olympics. In March 2021, the President of the International Olympic Committee Thomas Bach opposed a boycott, which would also damage the IOC image and finances, and said that the IOC must stay out of politics. Australia, Belgium, Canada, Denmark, Kosovo, Lithuania, Taiwan, the United Kingdom, and the United States announced diplomatic boycotts of the 2022 Winter Olympics.

== Denial of abuses ==
The abuses against the Uyghurs and related ethnic groups have been denied by the Chinese government, as well as Chinese citizens interviewed by The Diplomat in 2021. The Chinese government has conducted propaganda campaigns on social media to further denial of the abuses. In 2021, the Chinese government posted thousands of videos to social media showing residents of Xinjiang denying claims of abuse made by Mike Pompeo; a joint investigation by ProPublica and The New York Times found the videos were part of an influence campaign coordinated by the CCP's Central Propaganda Department. They have also used their existing disinformation networks, including social media trolls, to deny genocide and other human rights abuses against Uyghurs.

In 2020, Chinese Foreign Ministry spokesperson Wang Wenbin, in response to allegations that China had destroyed or damaged 16,000 mosques, described the claims as "slanderous rumors" and stated that China had "more than 24,000 mosques in Xinjiang, which is over 10 times more than in the US".

In 2020, during an interview with Andrew Marr of the BBC, the Chinese ambassador to the UK Liu Xiaoming denied any abuse against Uyghurs despite being shown drone footage of what appeared to be shackled Uyghur, and other minority ethnic, prisoners being herded on to trains during a prison transfer. The ambassador also blamed reports of forced sterilisations on "some small group of anti-China elements". In January 2021, Ministry of Foreign Affairs spokesperson Zhao Lijian responded to questions about the Uyghur genocide during a press briefing by stating, "China has no genocide; China has no genocide; China has no genocide, period." In February 2021, Wang Wenbin called the Uyghur genocide the "lie of the century".

The abuses, and the existence of the camp network, have also been denied by a small minority of American left-wing media outlets and social media influencers. These include a left-wing blog called LA Progressive which began publishing denial articles in April 2020, while The Grayzone has been the most influential outlet to publish articles denying "China's ongoing repression of the Uyghur people". The Grayzone has been featured by Chinese state media, including CGTN and the Global Times. In 2020, China's Ministry of Foreign Affairs spokesperson Hua Chunying retweeted a story published by The Grayzone which claimed to have debunked research into the re-education camps in Xinjiang.

According to former National Security Advisor John Bolton, US President Donald Trump in 2019 told Xi that building re-education camps was "exactly the right thing to do." This response was cited by La Trobe University anthropologist Gerald Roche in a 2021 Nation article to argue that Xinjiang denialism only served to aid Chinese and American imperialism.

In February 2021, a Press Gazette investigation found that Facebook had accepted money to promote content from Chinese state media outlets such as China Daily and China Global Television Network that denied the mistreatment of Uyghurs.

According to an article in Workers World, in an April 2021 group interview with CGTN anchor Liu Xin, Syrian and Palestinian ambassadors to China Imad Moustapha and Fariz Mehdawi both accused Western media of intentionally overlooking "the economic, social and cultural rights that Muslim Uyghurs and other ethnic minorities enjoy in the region", following their visits to Xinjiang. RFA journalist Shohret Hoshur alleged they were ignoring a genocide and cited a past interview with imprisoned Uyghur mother Patigul Ghulam who had said the Uyghurs were in a worse situation than the Palestinians and Syrians.

According to reports by the New Lines Institute, AmaBhungane, and The New York Times, Neville Roy Singham funds a network of nonprofits and groups, including Code Pink, that deny or downplay human rights abuses against Uyghurs and other Turkic Muslim minorities in Xinjiang. According to Sang Heae Kil of San Jose State University, within far-left circles, "there is a hesitancy to want to recognize that what's happening to the Uyghurs is a type of genocide."

In Taiwan, former KMT chairwoman Hung Hsiu-chu received criticism for claiming that Western nations had "fabricated lies about the so-called 'forced labor' and 'genocide' in Xinjiang to undermine China's internal unity" while on a Chinese government-sponsored trip to Xinjiang in 2022.

On 8 January 2023, Beijing invited a delegation of more than 30 Islamic scholars from 14 countries to visit Xinjiang. Visitors included World Bosniak Congress President Mustafa Cerić and Islamic Community of Serbia president Mevlud Dudić, both of whom praised Chinese government policies in the region. World Uyghur Congress President Dolkun Isa criticized the visit for "trying to deceive the world" about the abuses in Xinjiang.

A 2023 academic book by political theorists Alain Brossat and Juan Alberto Ruiz Casado (Note: Alain Brossat is a lecturer of philosophy at the Paris 8 University, while Juan Alberto Ruiz Casado is Marie Sklodowska-Curie Cofund Fellow at Ca' Foscari, University of Venice.) labeled the accusation of genocide as unsubstantiated. They described the information used to apply the label as misleading and coming "exclusively from a few sources, for the most part overwhelmingly and openly partisan in their anti-China crusade"; they especially criticize Adrian Zenz's 2018 detainee study and 2019 sterilization study as "academically flimsy" and containing misleading or directly false claims, respectively.

Darren Beattie, the acting Under Secretary of State for Public Diplomacy and Public Affairs during the second Trump administration, previously wrote, "The Chinese aren't genocidal. They just object to Uyghur supremacy and uyghurness. If Uyghurs simply reject Uyghur supremacy, they'll have no problem functioning in Chinese society." In another post in 2021, he wrote "Uighurs don't like anti-Uighur racism, it must be because they are Uighur nationalists who think all of China is for Uighurs ONLY." He also wrote in the August 2024 that, "Britain treats its own native white people far worse than China treats its muslim Uighur population."

Barry Sautman writes that the Uyghur genocide claim differs substantially from other contentions of genocide because there is no evidence of mass killings. Sautman observes that "in 2017-2019, the key years for the genocide claim, the Xinjiang death rate fell from 4.48 per 1,000 to 4.45. In contrast, in Gaza, the crude death rate in 2024 was 39.3 per 1,000 people, 14 times the all-cause mortality in 2022, even when ignoring non-injury excess mortality, e.g. disease, starvation, etc."

== See also ==
- Outline of genocide studies
- Ethnic minorities in China
- History of the Uyghur people
- Persecution of Uyghurs in Turkey
- History of Xinjiang
  - Turkic settlement of the Tarim Basin
  - Dzungar genocide
  - Dungan Revolt
  - Xinjiang conflict
- Xinjiang papers
- Transnational repression by China
