= Perhat =

Perhat (Uyghur: پەرھات) is a Uyghur masculine given name. Notable people with the name include:

- Perhat Khaliq (born 1982), Chinese Uyghur pop-rock composer and musician
- Perhat Tursun (born 1969), Uyghur writer and poet
