= Two-faced person =

Chinese political term

Two-faced person (Chinese: 两面人; pinyin: liǎngmiàn rén) is a Chinese political term often used by the Chinese Communist Party (CCP) to describe an official or party member who is either corrupt or ideologically disloyal to the party. Xi Jinping, the current general secretary of the CCP and China's president, has repeatedly said that the Chinese people should "resolutely fight against two-faced cliques and two faced-persons." First used in the 1960s, the term began to be used more frequently in the 2010s in response to proponents of Xinjiang independence and critics of China's approach to the Uyghur people.

== Historical use ==
In 1967, the Chinese literary theorist Zhou Yang, who was a supporter of Mao Zedong, was labelled as two-faced by gang of four member Yao Wenyuan, in an essay titled "On the Two-Faced Counter-Revolutionary Zhou Yang (《评反革命两面派周扬》)".

In 2017 the Cyberspace Administration of China, which administers access to the Internet in China, publicly criticized its former director Lu Wei, calling him "a typical two-faced person (典型的两面人)".

Since 2017, the term has also been used to refer to Uyghur politicians and celebrities who secretly support Xinjiang independence, and to those criticizing Chinese policies related to the Uyghurs. Prominent examples are Shirzat Bawudun and Sattar Sawut, who respectively are former heads of justice and education in Xinjiang.

In 2020, Zhao Zhengyong, 69, the former chief of the Shaanxi Provincial Committee of the Communist Party was sentenced to death following his conviction for embezzling over $100 million yuan. Just before his conviction, he was called a "shameless two-faced person (可耻的两面人)" in a CCP publication. Three years prior to this, Zhao had called in the same journal for a crackdown on "two-faced people in government".

In 2021, fashion house Hugo Boss was accused of being two-faced following its criticism of Chinese labor and human rights practices regarding Uighurs working in Xinjiang. The United States responded that the criticism was part of a state-run campaign designed to criticize those who had encouraged a boycott of Uighur-produced cotton.
