= UN Human Rights Office report on Xinjiang =

2022 United Nations report

OHCHR Assessment of human rights concerns in the Xinjiang Uyghur Autonomous Region, People's Republic of China
- Presented: 31 August 2022
- Commissioned by: Office of the United Nations High Commissioner for Human Rights
- Subject: Human rights in the Xinjiang Uyghur Autonomous Region

Official website
- Report website

The OHCHR Assessment of human rights concerns in the Xinjiang Uyghur Autonomous Region, People's Republic of China is a report published on 31 August 2022 by the Office of the United Nations High Commissioner for Human Rights (OHCHR) concerning the treatment of Uyghurs and other largely Muslim groups in China. The report concluded that "[t]he extent of arbitrary and discriminatory detention of members of Uyghur and other predominantly Muslim groups, pursuant to law and policy, in context of restrictions and deprivation more generally of fundamental rights enjoyed individually and collectively, may constitute international crimes, in particular crimes against humanity." Human rights commissioner Michelle Bachelet released the report shortly before leaving the office.

== Background ==
Since 2014, the Chinese government, under the administration of the Chinese Communist Party (CCP) General Secretary Xi Jinping, has pursued policies in its Xinjiang region that have resulted in the incarceration of more than an estimated one million Turkic Muslims in re-education camps without any legal process. This is the largest-scale detention of ethnic and religious minorities since World War II. Some experts claim that, since 2017, some sixteen thousand mosques have been razed or damaged, and hundreds of thousands of children have allegedly been forcibly separated from their parents and sent to boarding schools.

Western public reporting has stated that Chinese government policies have included the arbitrary detention of Uyghurs in state-sponsored re-education camps, forced labor, suppression of Uyghur religious practices, political indoctrination, severe ill-treatment, forced sterilization, forced contraception, and forced abortion. Chinese government statistics reported that from 2015 to 2018, birth rates in the mostly Uyghur regions of Hotan and Kashgar fell by more than 60%. In the same period, the birth rate of the whole country decreased by 9.69%. Chinese authorities acknowledged that birth rates dropped by almost a third in 2018 in Xinjiang, but denied reports of forced sterilization and genocide. Birth rates in Xinjiang fell a further 24% in 2019, compared to a nationwide decrease of 4.2%.

The Chinese government asserts that they haven't committed human rights abuses in Xinjiang, and accuses the West of misrepresenting the situation for geostrategic purposes. International reactions have varied. Some United Nations (UN) member states issued statements to the United Nations Human Rights Council condemning China's policies, while others supported China's policies. In December 2020, a case brought to the International Criminal Court was dismissed because the crimes alleged appeared to have been "committed solely by nationals of China within the territory of China, a State which is not a party to the Statute", meaning the ICC couldn't investigate them. The United States has declared the human rights abuses a genocide, announcing its finding on 19 January 2021. Legislatures in several countries have since passed non-binding motions describing China's actions as genocide, including the House of Commons of Canada, the Dutch parliament, the House of Commons of the United Kingdom, the Seimas of Lithuania, and the French National Assembly. Other parliaments, such as those in New Zealand, Belgium, and the Czech Republic condemned the Chinese government's treatment of Uyghurs as "severe human rights abuses" or crimes against humanity.

In light of the reports of abuses, as well as the international reactions to them, the Office of the United Nations High Commissioner for Human Rights sought to investigate the reports of abuses in the region. Nearly four years following the findings by a U.N. Committee that the estimates of more than one million Muslims having been arbitrarily detained were credible claims, the OHCHR Assessment of human rights concerns in the Xinjiang Uyghur Autonomous Region, People's Republic of China was released on 31 August 2022.

== Report content ==
=== Investigative methods ===
The report was created by the United Nations through a thorough review of evidence documented by the OHCHR. Several forms of evidence were considered in making the report, including interviews with several dozen people who lived in Xinjiang at the time that abuses had been publicly reported. The report also focused its analysis on what the Chinese government had publicly stated contemporaneously with the reported abuses, including public Chinese government documents and laws promulgated at the time. In May 2022, OHCHR commissioner Michelle Bachelet visited Xinjiang. Prior to her visit, she spoke with representatives of several NGOs that were concerned about the both human rights situation in Xinjiang and in China, more broadly. After arriving in the region, she talked to numerous government officials, academics, and civil society leaders. However, due to opposition by China, the OHCHR was unable to conduct a more thorough investigation on-the-ground within the borders of the People's Republic.

=== Findings ===
The report's findings included that a large number of abuses had occurred within Xinjiang, corroborating academic research and public reporting on the abuses in the largely ethnic minority region. The report concluded that human rights abuses against Uyghurs and other Turkic Muslims in Xinjiang are serious and widespread.

==== Arbitrary detention ====
In the report, the OHCHR stated that reports that the Chinese government had arbitrarily detained Uyghurs and other Turkic Muslims en masse in the Xinjiang re-education camps were credible, specifying that the actions of the Chinese state amounted to deprivation of liberty and were undertaken in a discriminatory fashion. Former inmates who were detained in Xinjiang stated that they had received beatings while strapped to a chair and described undergoing torture similar to waterboarding; the report also noted that there was credible evidence of torture within re-education camps. The report indicated that these abuses constituted widespread violations of human rights and that they may rise to the level of crimes against humanity.

==== Forced labor ====
The report found that the Chinese government's labor schemes relating to what the government of China referred to as vocational training constituted discrimination. With respect to whether labor schemes that China describes as poverty alleviation schemes have involved the coercion of Uyghurs and other ethnic minorities into forced labor, the report stated that there was evidence that these schemes did indeed involve coercion of laborers.

==== Sexual violence and sterilizations ====
The OHCHR described reports of sexual violence targeted at Uyghurs and other Turkic Muslims within the Xinjiang re-education camps as credible. Women interviewed by the United Nations described being orally raped by prison guards and being forcibly subjected to examinations of their genitalia in front of large crowds. The report also noted that there was an "unusually sharp rise" in the amount of intrauterine device insertions and sterilizations performed in Xinjiang and stated that the Chinese government used coercive means to sharply lower the birth rate of Uyghurs in Xinjiang.

=== Recommendations ===
The report contains recommended courses of action for governmental actors, the United Nations, and for the broad international community. Among the recommendations for the Government of China are that it ratify the International Covenant on Civil and Political Rights, the International Convention for the Protection of All Persons from Enforced Disappearance, and the Optional Protocols to the Convention against Torture, the Convention on the Elimination of All Forms of Racial Discrimination and the Convention on the Elimination of All Forms of Discrimination against Women.

In March 2024, the United Nations High Commissioner for Human Rights, Volker Türk, called on China to implement the recommendations of the report.

=== Editing ===
According to Politico, the report was edited "to accommodate some of Beijing’s version" in the days before it was released and one diplomat had claimed that the section on sterilization had been "watered down during the final hours."

== Reception ==
The government said that the report was "based on the disinformation and lies fabricated by anti-China forces," publishing a 131-page counter-report. The Chinese Ministry of Foreign Affairs said that the assessment was "invalid and illegal." The government mounted pressure on UN rights chief Michelle Bachelet through diplomatic channels. North Korea, Venezuela and Cuba asked the UN chief to not publish the report.

The report was criticized by some activists for not calling the crimes a genocide. Many dissident Uyghurs outside China saw it as a formal acknowledgement of their views on the alleged suffering of Uyghurs in China, hoping it will add fuel to their campaign at the international level. Uyghur Human Rights Project executive director Omer Kanat called the report "a game-changer for the international response to the Uyghur crisis", adding that "[d]espite the Chinese government's strenuous denials, the UN has now officially recognized that horrific crimes are occurring".

U.S. Secretary of State Antony Blinken and U.S. Ambassador to the UN Linda Thomas-Greenfield both welcomed the report. European Union High Representative Josep Borrell and future short lived British Prime Minister Liz Truss (during her time as Foreign Secretary) also welcomed the report.

Pakistani foreign ministry backs China's efforts in Xinjiang for socioeconomic development, peace, and stability in Xinjiang. Foreign minister Bilawal Bhutto Zardari accused the report by OHCHR were "taken out of context". Many other Muslim-Majority nations take similar stances.

Darren Byler, an assistant professor at Simon Fraser University, called the report "a major vindication, for former detainees and their family members, and confirmation that the work of hundreds of researchers and journalists is valid". The report, according to Byler, is a persuasive repudiation of China's "counter terrorism laws" which have been exploited to abuse China's Muslim minorities.

== See also ==
- China and the United Nations
- Xinjiang conflict
- Xinjiang re-education camps
