= Darren Byler =

American anthropologist and author

Darren Byler is an American anthropologist and author. He is an associate professor of International Studies at Simon Fraser University in British Columbia, Canada. Byler specializes in the Uyghurs in China and has written about the ongoing oppression of the ethnic group in China, such as through the Xinjiang re-education camps.

Byler has a BA in History & Visual Journalism from Kent State University, an MA in East Asian Studies from Columbia University, and a PhD in Socio-Cultural Anthropology from the University of Washington. Prior to joining Simon Fraser University, he conducted postdoctoral research at the University of Colorado.

Byler has worked as an advisor with faculty members and researchers at the University of British Columbia and Simon Fraser University to build the Xinjiang Documentation Project, a project that documents the persecution of Uyghurs in Xinjiang. His research has been supported by Columbia University's Global Reports series and a Luce Foundation and American Council of Learned Societies Early Career Fellowship. His book Terror Capitalism received the 2023 Margaret Mead Award from the American Anthropological Association and the Society for Applied Anthropology. He was also co-awarded the 2023 Gregory Bateson Award from the Society for Cultural Anthropology.

He has also co-translated a Uyghur language novel by leading modernist author Perhat Tursun titled The Backstreets which was published by Columbia University Press. Tursun was disappeared into the re-education camp system in Northwest China in 2018. Following its publication, it was named one of the “best books of 2022” by The New Yorker and described by The Atlantic as “a near perfect work of art.”

Byler has been frequently attacked by Chinese state media, who have accused him of being an agent of the United States government, which Byler has categorically distanced himself from on National Public Radio saying "I'm absolutely not affiliated with the U.S. government anywhere, never have been, never will be." The Global Times, one such state-run outlet, has accused Byler of being an anti-China figure who makes "fabricated" allegations about genocide and crimes against humanity in Xinjiang.

== Books ==
- Terror Capitalism: Uyghur Dispossession and Masculinity in a Chinese City (Duke University Press, 2022)
- In the Camps: China's High-Tech Penal Colony (Columbia University Global Reports, 2021)
- Xinjiang Year Zero, co-edited with Ivan Franceschini and Nicholas Loubere (ANU Press, 2022)
