= Sattar Sawut =

Chinese Uyghur politician

- ساتتار ساۋۇت

Director of the Xinjiang Education Department
- In office 20 July 2000 – 2008
- Deputy: Alimjan Memtimin
- Succeeded by: Tursun Ibrahim

Personal details
- Born: November 1948 (age 77) Toksun County, Xinjiang, China
- Party: Chinese Communist Party (expelled)
- Education: Xinjiang Institute of Technology
- Occupation: politician

Sattar Sawut (Uyghur: ساتتار ساۋۇت; Chinese: 沙塔尔·沙吾提; born November 1948) is a Chinese former politician of Uyghur ethnicity. He was the former director of the Xinjiang Education Department. He was arrested in 2017. Later, he was regarded by the Chinese Communist Party (CCP) as a "two-faced person" who supported the independence movement through editing textbooks.

Sattar Sawut was given a death sentence with two-year reprieve for his role in the publication of school textbooks said to incite interethnic hatred. Five other Uyghurs were convicted in the same case. The former head of the local justice department was also sentenced to death for conspiring with Muslim separatists.

== See also ==
- Shirzat Bawudun
- Persecution of Uyghurs in China
