= Civil Servant-Family Pair Up =

Chinese governmental policy

- Traditional Chinese: 結對認親
- Simplified Chinese: 结对认亲
- Literal meaning: pair up families
Transcriptions
Standard Mandarin
- Hanyu Pinyin: jié duì rèn qīn

Civil Servant-Family Pair Up (Chinese: 结对认亲), also known as Pair Up and Become Family, is a policy of the government of the People's Republic of China (PRC) that forces designated Uyghur families to be matched with Han Chinese civil servants, with the families forced to host the civil servants in their home. Since the late 2010s, the PRC has vigorously promoted the policy in Xinjiang. Beginning in 2018, over one million Chinese government workers began forcibly living in the homes of Uyghur families to monitor and assess resistance to cultural assimilation as well as to surveil religious and cultural practices. According to the official state perspective, the policy is to provide Mandarin language training as a way to better integrate Uyghurs and as a means for the poverty alleviation of the region. Policies bearing the same name have also been implemented in impoverished regions in Anhui, Tibet, as well as for left-behind children, widowed elders, disabled people, and in earthquake-affected regions.

Hosting requirements have increased over time across counties and prefectures, ranging from 5 days per month to 14 days per month. Despite this, overseas Uyghurs have stated that 'visitation' times often exceeded the time requirement, with one stating that visits regularly occurred up to four times per week and eventually became full-time. Refusal to host leads to imprisonment in an re-education camp.

According to Radio Free Asia, these Han Chinese government workers have been trained to call themselves "relatives" and engage in the forcible co-habitation of Uyghur homes for the purpose of promoting "ethnic unity". Radio Free Asia reports that these men "regularly sleep in the same beds as the wives of men detained in the region’s internment camps." Chinese officials maintain that co-sleeping is acceptable, provided that a distance of one meter is maintained between the women and the "relative" assigned to the Uyghur home. Uyghur activists state that no such restraint takes place, citing pregnancy and forced marriage numbers, and name the program a campaign of "mass rape disguised as 'marriage'." Human Rights Watch has condemned the Pair Up and Become Family Program as a "deeply invasive forced assimilation practice", while the World Uyghur Congress states that it represents the "total annihilation of the safety, security and well-being of family members."

== See also ==
- Billet
- Persecution of Uyghurs in China
- Sinicization
- Targeted Poverty Alleviation
