= Shirzat Bawudun =

Chinese politician (1966–2024)

- شىرزات باۋۇدۇن

Director of the Xinjiang Justice Department
- In office 27 May 2016 – April 2017
- Preceded by: Abliz Hoshur
- Succeeded by: Enwer Siyit

Personal details
- Born: June 1966 Lop County, Xinjiang, China
- Died: 2024 (aged 58)
- Party: Chinese Communist Party (expelled)
- Education: Northwest Institute of Politics and Law
- Occupation: Politician

Shirzat Bawudun (Uyghur: شىرزات باۋۇدۇن; Chinese: 希尔扎提·巴吾东; June 1966 – 2024) was a Chinese Uyghur politician who was head of the department of justice in Xinjiang Uygur Autonomous Region.

In July 1988, Shirzat graduated from the Northwest University of Politics and Law. In 1994, Shirzat joined the Chinese Communist Party (CCP).

In April 2021, Shirzat was sentenced to death with a two-year reprieve on separatist charges. According to the Xinjiang Higher People's Court, Shirzat had received bribes, worked with terrorist groups and engaged in separatist activates. This included publishing school textbooks with the intent to "split the country" and incite ethnic hatred. The court stated that the textbooks had influenced those involved in the 2009 Ürümqi riots and the 2014 Ürümqi railway station bombing. The son of an editor of the textbooks claimed that the textbooks had received approval from the government and that the charges were "absurd".

In October 2024, Radio Free Asia reported that Shirzat had died in prison sometime between March and July 2024. He was 58.

== See also ==
- Sattar Sawut
- Persecution of Uyghurs in China
