= Boarding schools in China =

Boarding schools play a substantial role in primary and secondary education in mainland China, particularly in rural areas. As of 2015 there were about 100,000 boarding schools in rural China, enrolling roughly 33 million pupils, with the majority concentrated in the country's western provinces and in regions with large ethnic minority populations. The Chinese central government began establishing rural boarding schools in the 1950s; a school-merging program adopted in 2001 closed an estimated 240,000 village schools and redirected pupils into boarding facilities. Boarding kindergartens and other urban boarding schools serve a smaller share of pupils. Researchers and journalists have documented concerns over student welfare, nutrition, and rights at rural boarding schools.

== Urban boarding schools ==
As of 2017 about 4% of children in urban areas, around 3.5 million, boarded; about 1% of pupils at the primary level and 8% at the secondary level. Urban boarding schools are often close to students' residences, and some parents view boarding as helpful for concentration compared with grandparental supervision.

As of 2013 some children in urban areas were sent to boarding schools beginning at age three. The Chinese government established boarding kindergartens in 1949 for orphans of preceding wars. Boarding kindergartens for wealthier families peaked in popularity in the 1990s, then declined, with some converting to day schools and others closing.

== Rural boarding schools ==
The Chinese government began establishing boarding schools in rural and ethnic-minority areas in the 1950s, intending to extend formal education to children there without requiring relocation to urban areas. Establishment slowed during the Cultural Revolution but resumed afterward. Secondary boarding schools in centralized areas were established in the 1980s. The secondary schools, covering junior secondary (junior high) levels, are located in townships and towns.

As of 2017 about half of rural secondary students and about 12% of rural primary students boarded, with the number of primary boarders standing at about 10 million.

Many parents in rural areas who find work in urban areas leave their children at rural schools, since the absence of an urban hukou precludes enrollment in urban schools. Children who remain behind are referred to as "left-behind children" (Chinese: 留守儿童; pinyin: liúshǒu értóng).

=== History ===
Day schools and small "teaching points" originally served the educational needs of rural areas at the primary level. Each teaching point, staffed by one or two teachers, covered grades 1–3, and primary-level boarding schools were uncommon in rural China.

The one-child policy and rural-to-urban migration reduced the number of children in rural areas, and educational quality between rural and urban areas diverged. As part of the 2001 Decision of the State Council on Basic Education Reform and Development, the central government established a school-merging program to consolidate primary-level village education. Beginning in 2000, several thousand boarding schools opened, replacing about 240,000 village schools that closed during 2000–2015, amounting to about 75% of China's village primary schools. The central government argued that replacing village schools with boarding schools would allow more efficient use of resources and improve school quality. Zhenzhou Zhao (赵振洲; Zhào Zhènzhōu), author of a 2011 research article on rural boarding schools, argued that the closures were primarily driven by tax reforms that reduced the revenues of local governments still responsible for funding education.

In 2007, 53.6% of rural secondary students in western China boarded, as did 11.6% of primary students in the same regions. In ethnic-minority provinces such as Guangxi, Tibet, and Yunnan, secondary boarding rates exceeded 70%, and primary boarding rates exceeded 20%.

In 2013 some regions reported a shortage of dormitory managers for rural primary schools. The Rural Education Action Program (REAP), based at Stanford University's Freeman Spogli Institute for International Studies, sought to recruit dormitory managers.

=== Research ===
Zhenzhou Zhao's 2011 study, drawing on surveys and interviews at 21 schools in Guangxi and Qinghai, concluded that "children's interests are ignored and their rights overlooked in educational policy formulation and enactment" and that the schools "fail to provide a safe, healthy environment or protect and enable students' human rights".

== Sources ==
- Shu, Binbin (舒玢玢) and Yuying Tong (同钰莹) (Chinese University of Hong Kong Department of Sociology). "Boarding at School and Students' Well-Being: The Case of Rural China". Population Association of America 2015 Annual Meeting.
- Zhao, Zhenzhou (Hong Kong Institute of Education). "A matter of money? Policy analysis of rural boarding schools in China". Education, Citizenship and Social Justice 6, no. 3 (November 2011): 237–249. doi:10.1177/1746197911417415.
