= Perhat Tursun =

Uyghur writer and poet (born 1969)

- Born: January 1969 (age 57); Artush, Xinjiang, China
- Education: Minzu University of China
- Occupations: Novelist, poet
- Writing career
- Language: Uighur, Chinese
- Period: 1980–2018
- Genres: Novel, poem
- Notable works: One Hundred Love Lyrics; Messiah Desert; The Art of Suicide

Uyghur name
- Uyghur: پەرھات تۇرسۇن
Transcriptions
- Latin Yëziqi: Perhat Tursun

Chinese name
- Simplified Chinese: 帕尔哈提·吐尔逊
- Traditional Chinese: 帕爾哈提·吐爾逊
Transcriptions
Standard Mandarin
- Hanyu Pinyin: Pà'ěrhātí Tǔ'ěrxùn

Perhat Tursun (Uyghur: پەرھات تۇرسۇن; Chinese: 帕尔哈提·吐尔逊; born January 1969) is a Uyghur writer and poet. He is considered to be one of the most notable modern Uyghur writers. In January 2018, he was seized by Chinese authorities from Urumqi and was later reported to have been sentenced to 16 years of imprisonment.

== Biography ==
Perhat was born in 1969 in Artush, Xinjiang. He began writing poetry in middle school before later turning to prose. He attended college on a government scholarship at Minzu University in Beijing, where he learned to speak Chinese in order to read novelists and philosophers whose works had been translated from other languages, including William Faulkner and Arthur Schopenhauer. His work would also be inspired by figures including Rumi and Franz Kafka. During this time, his poetry and short stories dealt with controversial subjects with a modernist style. He graduated in 1989 and returned to Urumqi, where he would gather with other intellectuals and Uyghur writers.

After returning to his home region, Perhat worked as a researcher at the Xinjiang People's Arts Center. His 1998 poetry collection, One Hundred Love Lyrics, was well-received, while his novella collection, Messiah Desert, was met with some controversy after its publication in the same year because of its unconventional themes and imagery, including explicit sexual content. In 1999, he published a lengthy modernist novel, The Art of Suicide, which became one of the most widely discussed novels published in Uyghur. Uyghur conservatives in Xinjiang denounced the book as heretical, leading to book burnings and death threats against Perhat. Publishers in Xinjiang region, which are largely state-run, responded to the controversy by refusing to publish any works by Perhat for the next 16 years.

Perhat disappeared in January 2018, and the following month, reports claimed that he was sentenced to 16 years in prison. The specific reasons for his arrest are unknown, but it has been suggested this might be due to him signing a petition asking the Chinese government to respect the Uighur language. Perhat was working on five uncompleted novels at the time of his disappearance. The United States Commission on International Religious Freedom noted that he was detained "amid a campaign of arbitrary mass detention in which [Xinjiang] officials targeted Uyghurs and members of other largely Muslim ethnic groups for reasons including expression of ethnic, cultural, or religious identity".

== Recognition ==
Writing for Foreign Policy, Bethany Allen-Ebrahimian described him as China's Salman Rushdie, due to the controversy sparked by his 1999 novel, The Art of Suicide. Fellow modernist Uyghur poet Tahir Hamut Izgil has described his writing as "truly unique".

In 2022, Swedish PEN awarded Perhat Tursun with the Tucholsky Prize.

== Published works ==
- One Hundred Love Lyrics (1998)
- Messiah Desert (1998)
- The Art of Suicide (1999)

=== English translations ===
- "Two Poems: 'Morning Feeling' and 'Elegy'," translated by Joshua L. Freeman, Hayden's Ferry Review 48, pp. 46–53 (2011)
- The Backstreets: A Novel from Xinjiang, translated by Darren Byler and Anonymous, Columbia University Press (2022)
