= September 2009 Xinjiang unrest =

Attacks and ensuing unrest event in China

September 2009 Xinjiang attacks
- Part of the Xinjiang conflict
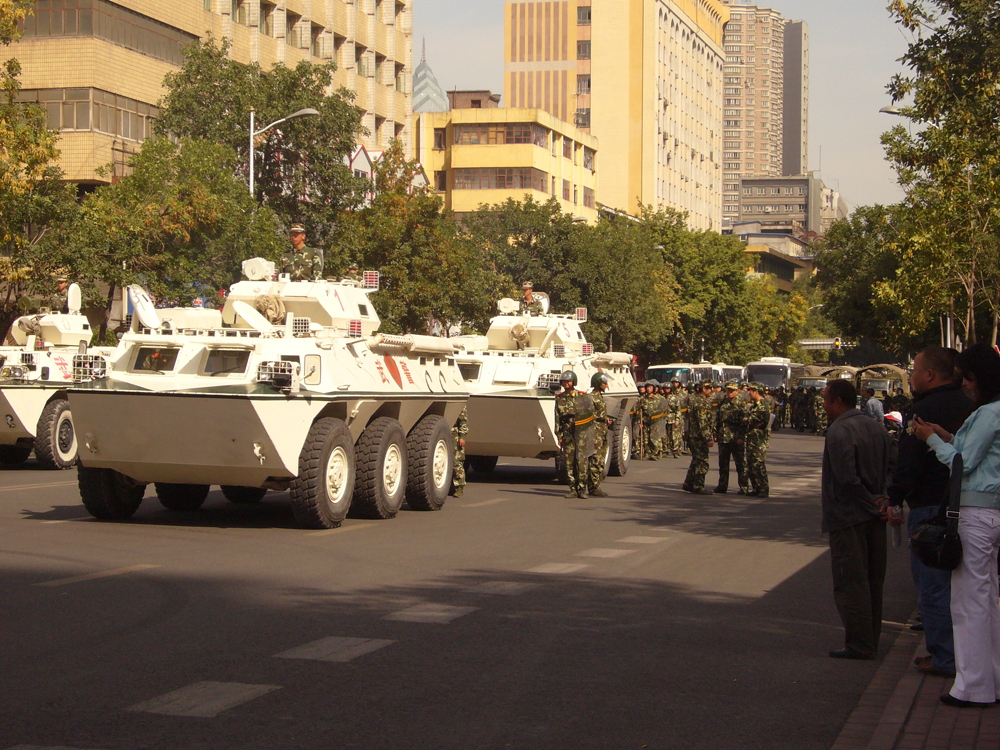
- Deployed PAP troops during the unrest in 4 September 2009
- Location: Ürümqi, Xinjiang, China
- Date: September 2009 (CST, UTC+8)

In September 2009, Ürümqi, the capital of the Xinjiang Uyghur Autonomous Region in the People's Republic of China, experienced a period of unrest in the aftermath of the July 2009 Ürümqi riots. Late August and early September saw a series of syringe attacks on civilians. In response to the attacks, thousands of residents held protests for several days, resulting in the deaths of five people. In addition, the arrest and beating of several Hong Kong journalists during the protests attracted international attention.

== Syringe attacks and protests ==
According to Xinjiang police, attacks in which hundreds of individuals claim to have been stabbed with hypodermic needles began on 17 August. On 2 September, posters appeared around Ürümqi saying that 418 people had reported being stabbed or pricked, referring to the attacks as a "serious terrorist crime", although the government had so far not produced evidence of any terrorist link. Ürümqi authorities said that fewer than one in five of reported stabbings had left any obvious mark. A six-person People's Liberation Army medical review panel announced at a press conference: "In the patients we have seen in the last couple of days, there are many which we believe were not actually punctured with needles," They believed the false reports were due to widespread fear and lack of medical knowledge. According to state media, witnesses say those who had been attacked include Han and Uyghurs, although the BBC said that Han Chinese claimed they were being targeted.

In response to both concern over the attacks and dissatisfaction over the government's slowness in prosecuting people involved with the July riots, protesters took to the streets. Official media reported tens of thousands marching in the city centre on the morning of 3 September. The police dispersed the crowd with tear gas; five people died during the protests and 14 were injured. After the latest protest, the government announced a ban on all "unlicensed marches, demonstrations and mass protests".

On 4 September, the Chinese Communist Party Chief of Ürümqi, Li Zhi, was removed from his post, along with the police chief, Liu Yaohua. Li Zhi was later replaced with Zhu Hailan in a decision by the Xinjiang Autonomous Regional Committee. No reasons were given for the dismissals. On 9 September, state media outlet China Daily reported a further 77 syringe attacks from the previous two days.

== Assault on journalists ==
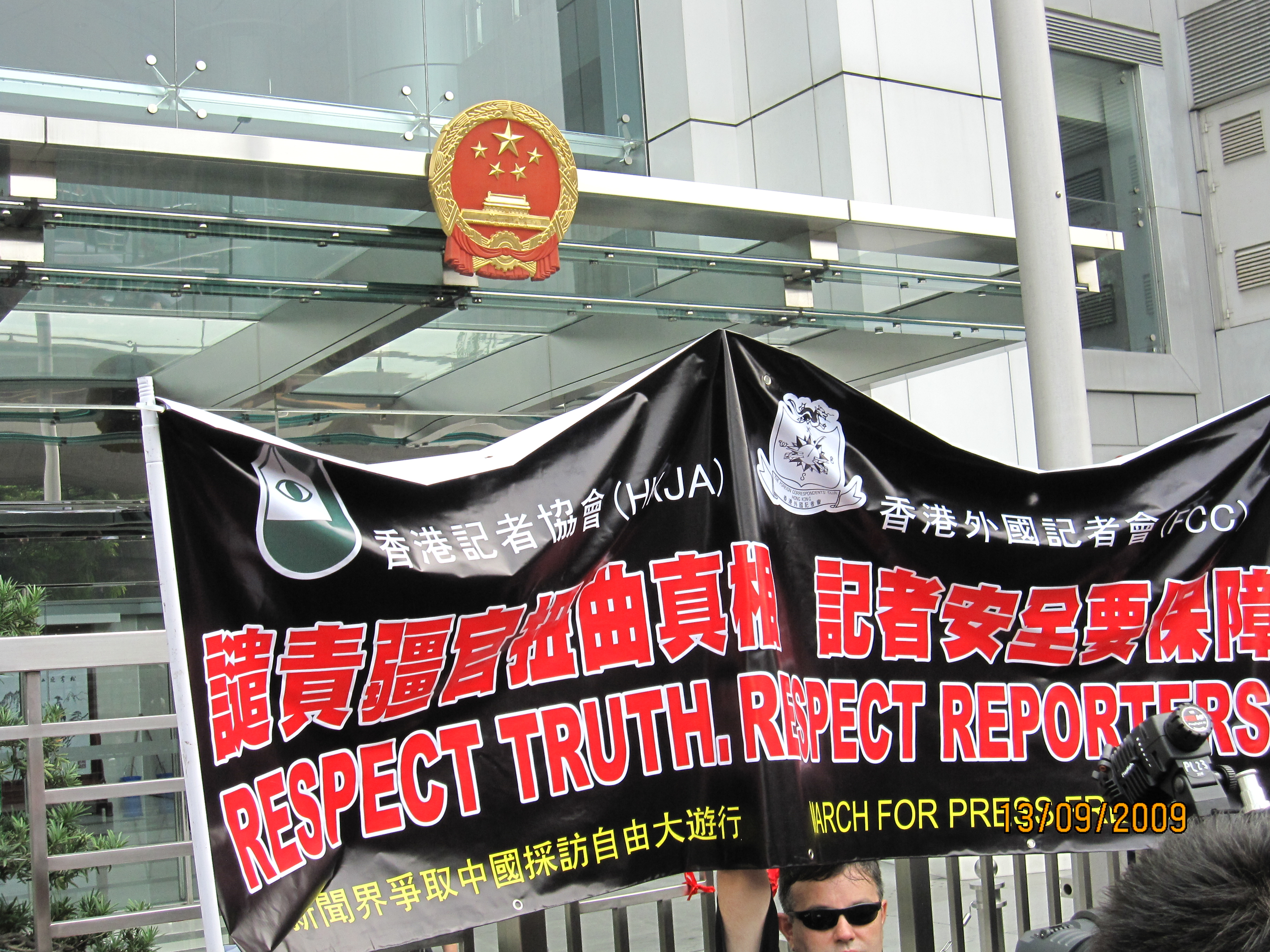
Journalists rally for press freedom

On 4 September 2009, three Hong Kong journalists were tackled and detained by paramilitary police while filming a disturbance. According to the Foreign Correspondent's Club of China, the reporters were punched and kicked by the police, then detained face-down on the ground with their hands tied behind their backs for up to 20 minutes. Their pleas to the armed police to check their central government-issued press identification cards were ignored. The reporters complained of being handcuffed and detained for three hours. The Xinjiang authorities blamed the journalists for inciting the disturbance, saying they were "not acting appropriately, for example gesturing to the crowd"; they however, regretted the "alleged beating". The spokesman said: "Of the three journalists, only one had a temporary press card that allowed him to conduct interviews in the city, but the other two didn't. They violated our regulations." The three journalists were TVB cameraman Lam Tsz-ho (林子豪), journalists Lau Wing-chuan (劉永全) and Now TV cameraman Lam Chun-wai (林振威).

Five more journalists were detained on 6 September. They include Commercial Radio Hong Kong reporter Yeung Tung-tat (楊通達), RTHK correspondent Chan Miu-ling (陳妙齡), Chow Man-tau (周文泰), and Now TV reporter Gary Chan Wai-li and cameraman Lau Hiu-lap. They were taken away by officers, but were released half an hour later.

Hong Kong politicians were united in their outrage over the incident, and the apparent violation of press freedom, which was a core value enshrined in the Basic Law. Chief Executive Donald Tsang said that he had written to the Xinjiang government, the State Council and the Hong Kong and Macao Affairs Office of the State Council. Seven local National People's Congress deputies wrote to NPC chairman Wu Bangguo to express their concern. Legislators from the Establishment camp as well as the pan-democrats regarded the incitement allegations "unpersuasive", and said Beijing must launch a full and detailed inquiry into the beatings.

On 8 September 2009, Hong Kong journalists met with Ürümqi officials over the incidents. The four media outlets whose journalists were assaulted were excluded, but they showed up anyway. On 13 September 2009, about 700 people including Hong Kong journalists and politicians marched on local offices of China's central government to protest the alleged police beatings of the three reporters.

== See also ==
- June 2009 Shaoguan incident
- 2008 Tibetan unrest
- 2008 Uyghur unrest
- Ghulja Incident
