= Kowloon City Plaza =

Shopping centre in Kowloon City, Hong Kong

Coordinates: 22.33096°N 114.18823°E

Kowloon City Plaza (KCP)
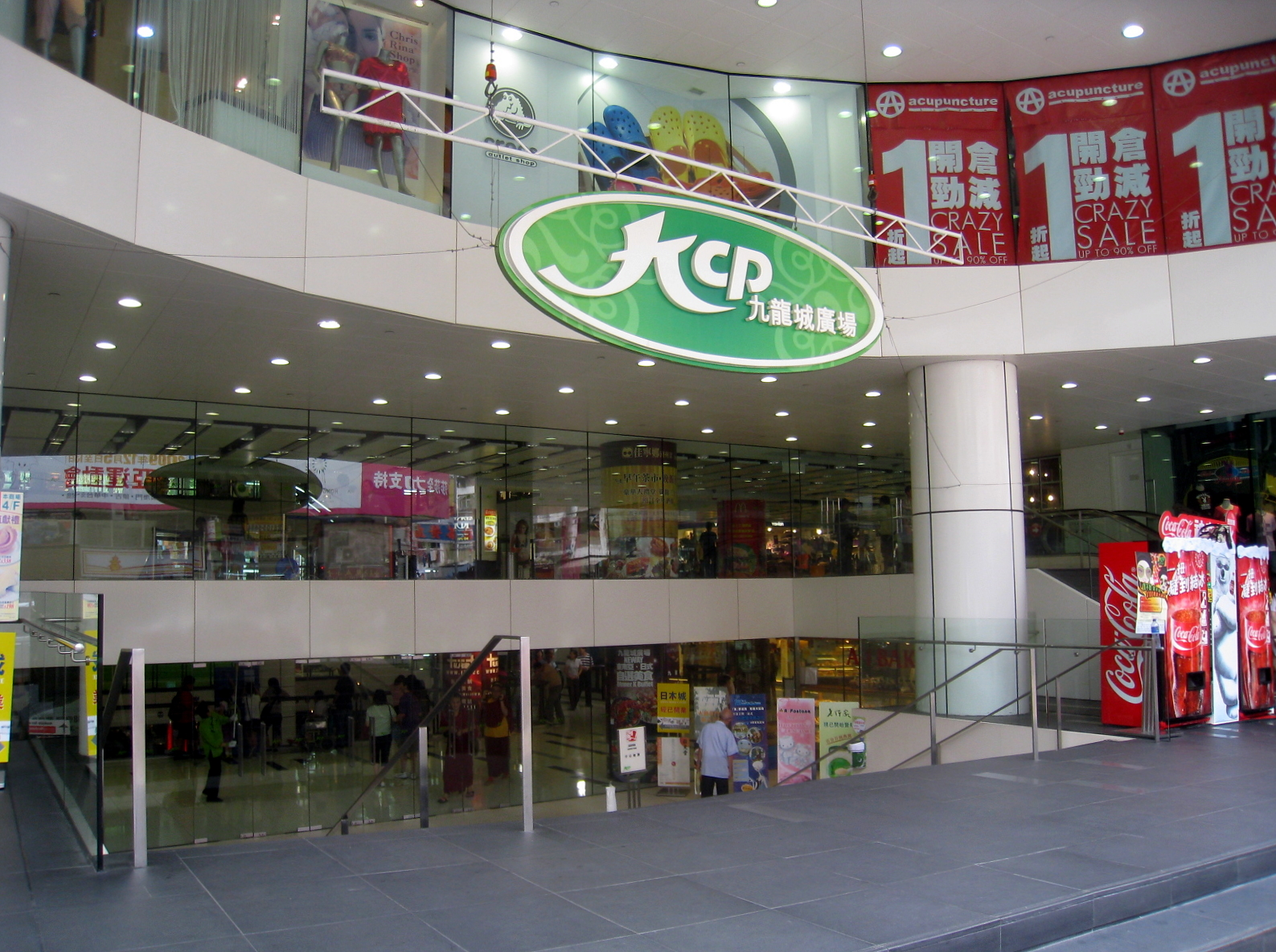
- The main entrance of Kowloon City Plaza
- Location: 128 Carpenter Road, Kowloon City, Kowloon, Hong Kong
- Opened: 1993; 33 years ago
- Developer: Paliburg Holdings
- Architect: Aedas Architects (for renovation of 2005-06)
- Num. of stores: over 70
- Floor area: 640,000 sq ft (59,000 m^{2})
- Floors: 10 floors
- Parking: 400 spaces
- Website: KCP

Kowloon City Plaza
- Traditional Chinese: 九龍城廣場
- Simplified Chinese: 九龙城广场
Transcriptions
Standard Mandarin
- Hanyu Pinyin: Jiǔlóngchéng Guǎngcháng
Yue: Cantonese
- Yale Romanization: jyou^{3} lung^{2} cheng^{2} gwang^{3} chang^{2}
- Jyutping: gau^{2} lung^{4} sing^{4} gwong^{2} coeng^{4}

Kowloon City Plaza (KCP; Chinese: 九龍城廣場) is a shopping centre located at Kowloon City, Kowloon, Hong Kong. It was established in 1993, and it underwent a HK$100-million renovation from October 2005 to December 2006. The shopping centre re-opened on 26 January 2007.

== History ==
On 28 November 1989, the site was purchased at government auction for HK$286 million by Lo Yuk-sui of development company Century City. Lo stated that his company planned to spend HK$700 million constructing a shopping and cinema complex, with a car park, on the site.

A subsidiary of Century City, Cathay City International, launched the Kowloon City Plaza development. The property was sold to Paliburg Holdings, a related company, in December 1990 for HK$357 million.

The complex received its occupation permit in May 1993. It opened later that year. Following the closure of nearby Kai Tak Airport, Paliburg Holdings proposed to build a 39-storey hotel on part of the site. However, this was rejected by the Town Planning Board on 19 November 1999, on the grounds that the scale of the proposal was not compatible with the site's surroundings.

Kowloon City Plaza was acquired by real estate fund Pamfleet, in partnership with Morgan Stanley, for HK$2.03 billion in April 2004. Pioneer Global Group, a technology company, subsequently took a small stake in the deal. Morgan Stanley also outsourced the management to Far East Consortium International Limited. In October 2005, the management company carried out a major renovation, completed in 2006 at a cost of around HK$100 million, of the interior and exterior of the property. Rents doubled following the refurbishment.

During the 2008 financial crisis, the property was sold to toy baron Francis Choi for HK$1.48 billion, and outsourced the management to Early Light.

== Location ==
The Logo of Kowloon City Plaza

Kowloon City Plaza is located near the Kowloon Walled City Park and Carpenter Road Park.

== Description ==
The building has a floor area of around 640,000 square feet (59,000 m^{2}) and houses over 70 shops and eateries over seven shopping levels. It also had 400 parking spaces. The anchor tenant is Japanese supermarket and department store AEON, which occupies the entirety of the 2/F and 3/F levels.

== Gallery ==
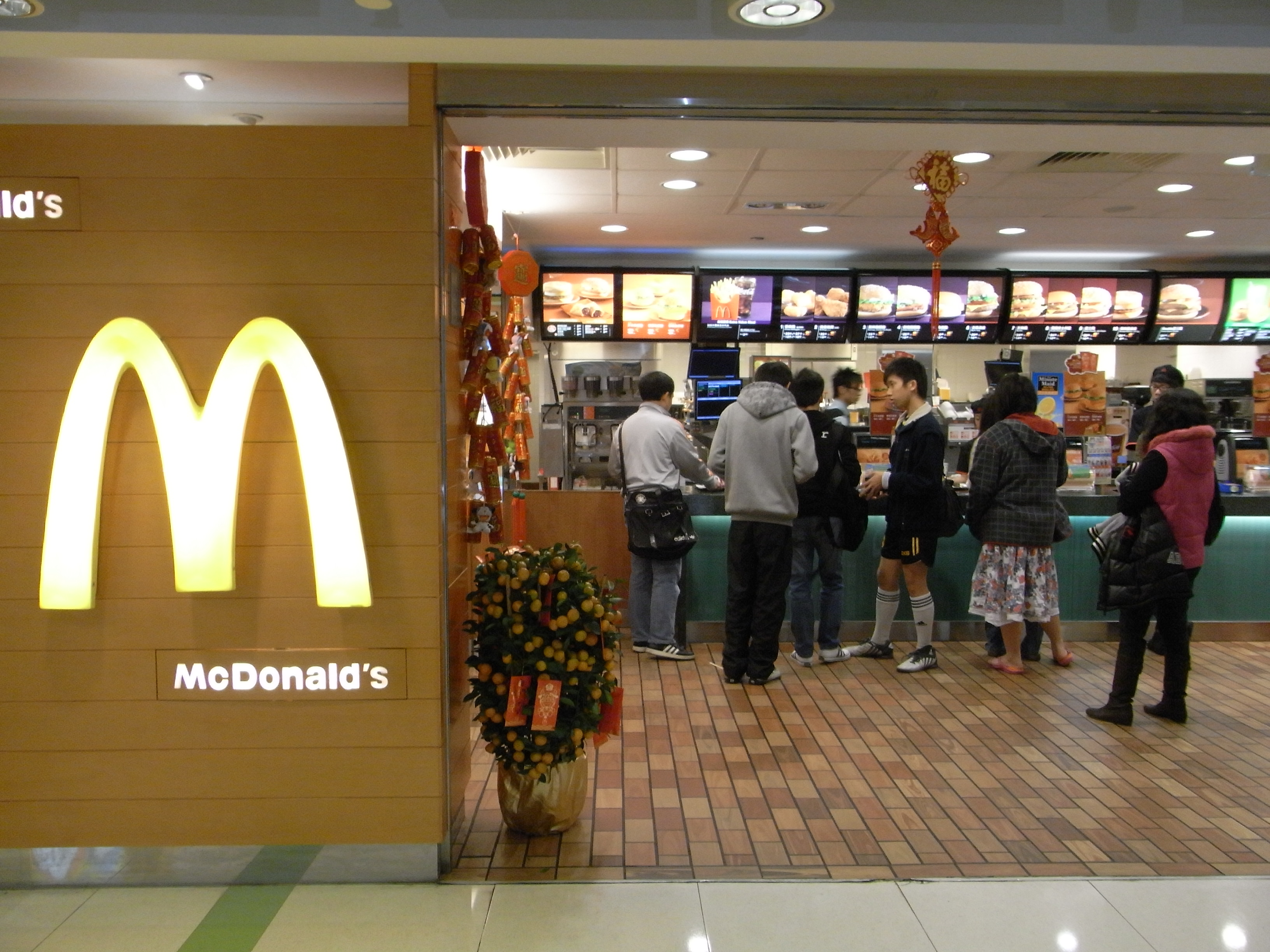
McDonald's in Kowloon City Plaza

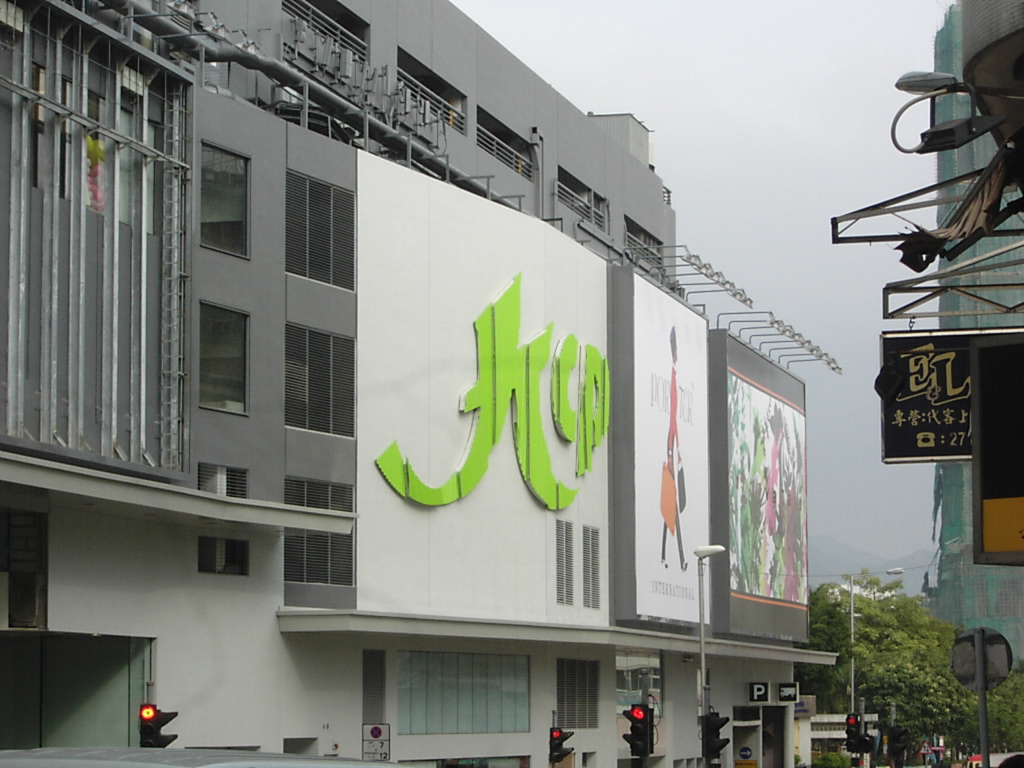
The exterior appearance of Kowloon City Plaza

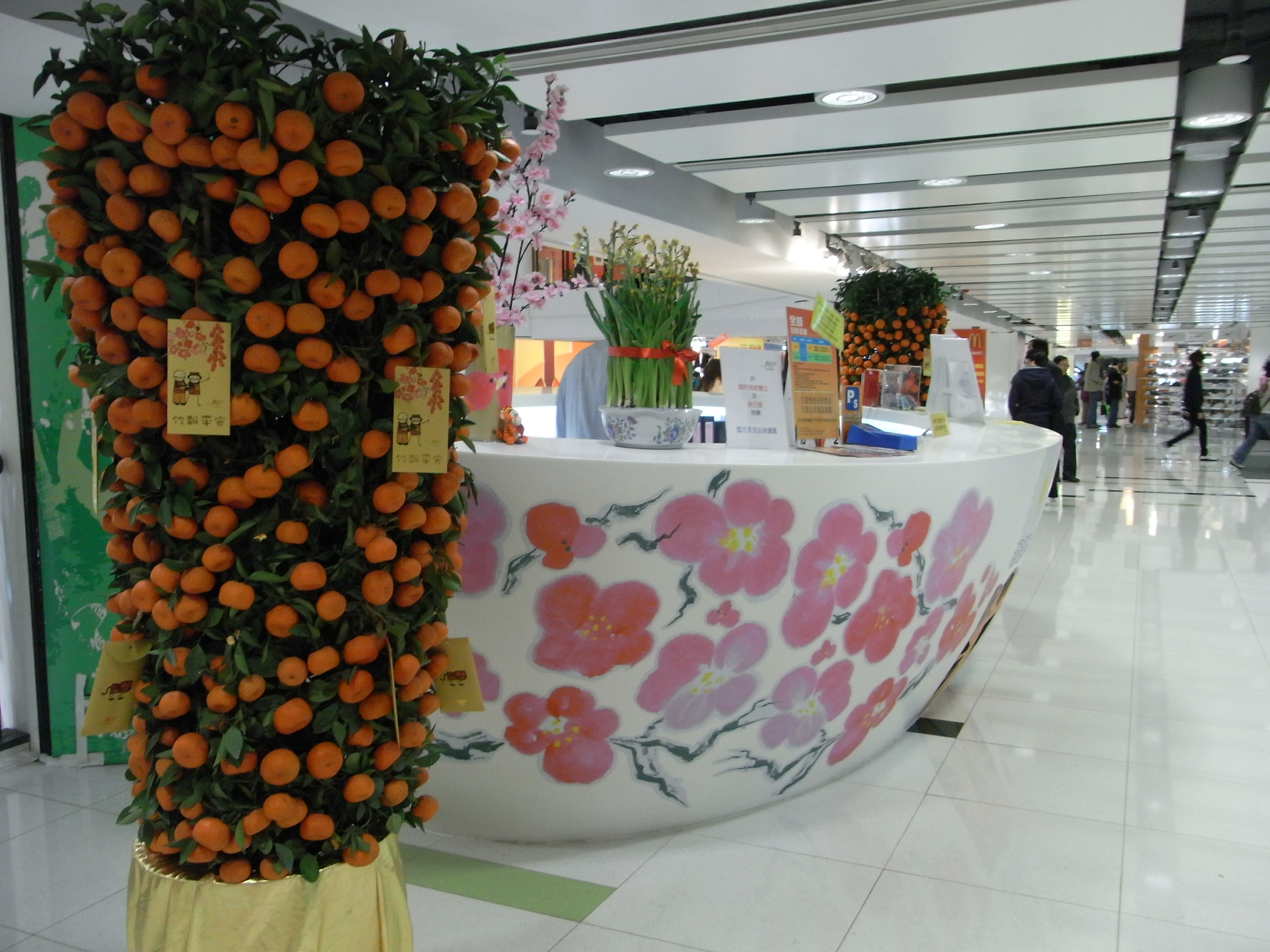
The Customer Services Counter of Kowloon City Plaza during Chinese Lunar New Year

== See also ==
- Shopping in Hong Kong
