= Uyghur riots =

Uyghur riots may refer to:

- 2008 Uyghur unrest
- July 2009 Ürümqi riots
