= Responsibility to protect in China =

The responsibility to protect (R2P) is a widely endorsed and developing norm aimed at preventing humanitarian atrocities. China has been receptive towards the development of R2P since its inception in 2001, despite China's traditional tendency to obstruct engagement in humanitarian crises. As veto-wielding Security Council member, important regional power, and major economic power, with interests in states experiencing, or vulnerable to, humanitarian crisis, including Nigeria, Zimbabwe, Angola and Sudan, the support of China for R2P is vital.

== Overview ==
=== A new sovereignty ===
A new understanding of state sovereignty arose in the 1990s, incorporating the element of "responsibility." This meant that no longer could state sovereignty be invoked to shelter states, guilty of committing massive humanitarian atrocities, from international condemnation.

In light of this progression, there have been indications that Chinese foreign policy has progressed to incorporate the belief that the international community has a responsibility to intervene in the most extreme circumstances Possible examples of this include:

- A government practicing blatant racism;
- State failure;
- Large-scale domestic violence; or
- The killing of civilians en masse.

China has been identified as a prima facie vulnerable country of concern, whose people are at significant risk of becoming victims of atrocity. It remains poorly regarded for its handling of internal dissent, especially the crackdowns in Tibet, Xinjiang and the Tiananmen Square massacre.

Historically, Chiang Kai-Shek's nationalists killed some 10 million people from 1927 to 1949 in group-targeted violence, while Mao Zedong's communists killed a further 7 million from 1934 onwards, not including the tens of millions who died following the famine of the Great Leap Forward or the violence of the Cultural Revolution, or the 300,000 Chinese slaughtered by Japanese during the Nanjing Massacre in December 1937.

=== Current Chinese foreign policy ===
Chinese foreign policy derives from the Five Principles of Peaceful Coexistence. These principles enshrine non-intervention as a cornerstone of Chinese foreign policy. Non-interference principles are also found in China's foreign policy manifestos. This is problematic because non-intervention rejects the common-assertion of R2P, that state sovereignty cannot justify non-action in the face of genocide or mass atrocity. Force is permitted in the last resort.

The concept of forcible intervention is "alien" to Asian nations especially following two horrific wars. Chinese reticence to forcible intervention can be traced back to its historical experiences during the First and Second Opium Wars of the nineteenth century, semi-colonization and the Cold War alongside the continued motivations of the Chinese government to maintain dominance over the regions of Tibet and Xinjiang (they also claim Taiwan despite the PRC never having any sovereign claim over the country).

China have also advocated the principles of state sovereignty and non-intervention to obstruct US-hegemonic expansion. China is skeptical of a Western system of human rights being imposed globally, and were quick to accuse the US of threatening a "rising China" following the accidental bombing of a Chinese embassy in Belgrade during the NATO bombing of Kosovo.

China believes that a state's economic development and historical background should be factors considered when looking at the humanitarian situation in that state. Jiang Zemin felt that human rights should be promoted in light of cultural diversities. However, this clashes statements made by Ban Ki-moon, that R2P must be integrated into all cultures "without hesitation or condition," to reflect its universality. In light of this, China initially dismissed the notion of R2P as a "total fallacy".

China submits that the responsibility to protect will always be conditional on Security Council approval, and be treated on a case-by-case basis. This prevents the creation of customary international law and allows China to block any action. China exercised its right to veto in respect of the Burmese and Zimbabwean conflicts. Nevertheless, it has been the rhetoric of Chinese diplomats to reinforce national, regional and global efforts to ensure peace, and on more than one occasion to emphasize "the moral obligation" the world has to secure peace in Africa. China has a contributing role in R2Ps operationalisation.

=== Socialisation ===
China has successfully integrated into the global economy, becoming a significant focal point of trade, investment and production. While Chinese society is still largely non-transparent, Chinese leaders are becoming more and more susceptible to international criticism following its increasing level of integration.

== History of China's position ==
Throughout the 1990s China was a key party to UN peacekeeping missions deployed to intrastate conflicts, take for example China's role in East Timor. This and other missions were authorized with the use of force to protect civilian populations along with being intimately involved in the internal affairs of the host-state. China strengthened this commitment after 2000, and as of August 2008 contributed more military and police personnel than any other permanent Security Council member.

While China can be seen as taking a more flexible approach to intervention and the acceptable use of force, it does continue to hamper Security Council efforts from time to time, perhaps to ensure a norm of customary international law does not develop, however more likely because the missions in question deviate from the China's traditional peacekeeping principles of nonviolence and impartiality.

China was a party to the 2005 endorsement of R2P, and reaffirmed its support for the doctrine in the same year. A momentous headway was made in the Security Council in 2006. In November 2005, Kofi Annan petitioned the Security Council to strengthen its R2P commitments, with regard to civilians in armed conflict. Following initial reluctance to specifically include R2P in a resolution, China eventually agreed to incorporate the same phrasing used in 2005 and voted in favour of Security Council Resolution 1674.

However, Chinese support since 2005 has been “cautious.” China was sure to limit its support of Resolution 1674 to the four specific crimes specified in the Outcome Document of 2005 and was skeptical of other states loosely interpreting it and abusing the concept by applying it to circumstances that were not intended. This skepticism peaked in 2007, when the Chinese augured that the Security Council must avoid forcible intervention, and because of differing interpretations the General Assembly must garner a broad consensus on the concept to prevent its misapplication by the Security Council.

However, during this period China consistently endorsed the World Summit phrasing and the primary responsibility each state has to protect their populations, and referred to Resolution 1673 as the “legal framework” within which the Security Council may work to protection of civilians in armed conflict. China has continually emphasized the key roles of conflict prevention and capacity building in R2Ps development to argue that the best form of protection is prevention. This mirrors the work of the Special Advisor to the UN Secretary-General who stresses that the primary focus of R2Ps implementation is preventing atrocities in the first instance. China argue that, failing this, any protective measures taken following the outbreak of conflict are virtually ineffectual. It is much better to provide civilians with “safe and predictable living environments,” hence their augmented peacekeeping role. China argue that bodies such as the General Assembly, the Economic and Social Council, The Human Rights Council, the United Nations Development Program and the World Bank all have to play their part, alongside regional organizations and non-governmental organizations. China's emphasis on enhancing the roles of various international bodies aligns with the efforts to actualise R2P.

Nevertheless, in cases where China has blocked or watered-down Security Council resolutions, it has taken strides to ensure political solutions. For example:

- Despite resisting a Security Council resolution, China played a “vital and constructive role” in brokering the Darfur peace plan in 2006;
- Despite voting against a resolution regarding the deteriorating situation in Burma in October 2007, China played a pivotal role in securing and organizing the UN special envoy visit to Yangon.
- While objecting to the imposition of sanctions on Sudan, Chinese diplomats warned the Sudanese government of the international communities dwindling patience over the crisis in Darfur, and the brewing impetus to impose sanctions on them.

These illustrations have been recognised as pragmatic support for the core concepts underpinning R2P.

China has responded to R2P in “pendulum-like movements,” evidenced in its strong criticism of NATO for its 1999 bombing of Kosovo compared to its explicit support for forcible intervention in East Timor very shortly after. China has also provided a strong regional dimension to its implementation of R2P, see for example the cases of Darfur and Myanmar.

=== Darfur ===
China thwarted proposed Security Council resolutions aimed at ending the atrocities that had already claimed nearly 300,000 civilian lives in Darfur. China was subject to international criticism for its concern for its own economic interests rather than for the humanitarian atrocities occurring in Sudan. Here, for the first time, China felt the need to respond to peer pressure.

==== Resolution 1672 ====
This sought to impose travel and financial sanctions on four alleged war criminals, impeding the peace process. Here, China objected on the ground that sanctions only work to victimize civilians and due to their coinciding with the Abuja peace talks; sanctions could forego any potential positive outcome of those talks. Moreover, they disliked the procedure that led to this resolution, which included premature suspension of discussion and a complete lack of supplementary detail clarifying the evidence which had led the Security Council to the proposed sanctions. China never stood opposed to international involvement, rather it felt it necessary to hold the perpetrators to account and supported the “pivotal” role the African Union had in securing peace in the region.

==== Resolution 1706 ====
This sought to place peacekeepers in the region and was the first reference to R2P in Resolution in relation to a specific conflict. China abstained on voting on the basis that Sudan had not consented, and that such measures should be postponed until Annan's recommendation, of holding high-level discussions, was played out. China believed this could derail progress at implementing the Comprehensive Peace Agreement. Nonetheless, China regarded the deployment of UN peacekeepers as a “good idea and realistic option,” so long as Sudanese consent could be obtained and in such event the deployment must take place in a timely manner. China, in its position, purposely mirrored the stance of the African Union, to ensure a lasting and peaceful result for the African region.

=== Myanmar/Burma ===
China blocked humanitarian action in Burma despite worsening conditions and refugee flows. It did so on the basis that the situation was neither a threat to international peace nor within the specific ambit of R2P. Thus, according to China it remained the within the internal affairs of Myanmar. China not only felt Security Council action would hinder the work being completed by other United Nations bodies, but that the “grave challenges” it faced, such as refugee flows, child labour, HIV/AIDS, human rights abuses and drugs did not warrant Security Council intervention.

China was criticized for this unsympathetic statement on the grounds that R2P involves crisis-prevention, that they had overlooked the seriousness of the refugee flows, and that its position directly countered specific resolutions allowing the council to consider situations where civilians are being targeted and humanitarian aid is denied. China once again felt that it was down to the Regional body, ASEAN, to play a “leading role” in addressing the Myanmar issue. ASEAN, much like China, prefer unobtrusive engagement, void of forcible intervention.
