= Li Zhi (politician) =

Chinese politician

- 栗智
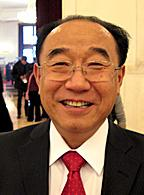

Communist Party Secretary of Ürümqi
- In office November 2006 – 6 September 2009
- Preceded by: Yang Gang
- Succeeded by: Zhu Hailun

Personal details
- Born: November 1950 (age 75) Lixin County, Anhui, China
- Party: Chinese Communist Party (1971–2015, expelled)

Li Zhi (Chinese: 栗智; pinyin: Lì Zhì; born November 1950 (Note: Birthdate according to the official biography. Since the Communist Party's anti-graft body accused Li of intentionally falsifying his age, it is not clear if this is his actual birthdate.)) is a former Chinese politician who spent his career in Xinjiang, most notable for his role as the Communist party chief of Ürümqi during the city's rioting in July 2009. He was originally from Lixin, Anhui. He was detained by the authorities for investigation in 2015 and then expelled from the Chinese Communist Party.

== Life and career ==
According to his official biography, Li joined the People's Liberation Army in 1969, joined the Chinese Communist Party in March 1971, and has a post-graduate degree. After retiring from military service, Li worked in Nilka County in Xinjiang as a labourer in the grains department. He then went on to serve in the Region's Light Manufacturing Bureau. He then served for about a decade in the hops industry. In 1993, he became the General Manager and Chairman of Xinjiang Hops Holdings Ltd.

His administrative career with the Communist Party began in 2000 as the deputy party chief of Changji Hui Autonomous Prefecture. He then became the party chief of the Bortala Mongol Autonomous Prefecture. He returned to Changji in January 2005 as the prefecture's party chief, and was elevated to the party chief of Ürümqi in November 2006, becoming first-in-charge of Xinjiang's capital. The party chief position in Ürümqi typically comes with an ex officio seat on the provincial Party Standing Committee.

Li Zhi was highly visible during the July 2009 Ürümqi riots; he calmed crowds on the streets of the capital using loudspeakers. After a series of deadly syringe attacks in the city, on September 5, 2009, after approval from the Xinjiang Autonomous Regional Committee of the Chinese Communist Party, Li was stripped of his post as party chief of Ürümqi. No official reasons were given for his removal from office; however, the Xinjiang leadership was facing tough questions from the local population on what was perceived as the poor handling of the rioting and subsequent unrest. Some sources suggest that Li was a scapegoat, removed to calm calls for the resignation of Wang Lequan, the Xinjiang regional party chief. The Xinjiang police chief was also removed from office on the same day.

In January 2008, Li became one of the vice-chairmen of the Xinjiang Regional People's Congress, he stayed on the post for five years. He left his last political post in 2014. On March 12, 2015, Li was detained by the party's anti-graft agency for investigation. Li was the first official who spent their entire career in Xinjiang to be investigated in the anti-corruption campaign after the 18th Party Congress. His predecessor as party chief of Urumqi Yang Gang had also been investigated, but Yang was not serving in Xinjiang at the time of his investigation.

On June 6, 2015, following an investigation by the Central Commission for Discipline Inspection (CCDI), Li was expelled from the Communist Party. The CCDI said that Li had "falsified archival documents, attempted to hide his real age from the party organization, took monetary gifts, used the convenience of his office to seek benefits for the promotion and placements of associates and to aid in the business interests of others; solicited and taken huge amounts of bribes, severely contravened socialist ethics" and "committed adultery." The investigation also concluded that he attempted to interfere with the investigation by attempting to move or hide his "ill-gotten gains." As bribery constituted a criminal offense, his case was moved to judicial authorities for prosecution. On November 18, 2016, Li was sentenced to 12 years in prison.

Party political offices
Preceded by Yang Gang	Communist Party Secretary of Urumqi; 2006–2009	Succeeded by Zhu Hailun
