= Yang Gang (politician) =

Chinese politician

- 杨刚

Deputy Director of the General Administration of Quality Supervision, Inspection and Quarantine
- In office December 2010 – July 2013
- Director: Zhi Shuping

Deputy Party Secretary of Xinjiang
- In office November 2006 – December 2010
- Party Secretary: Wang Lequan

Party Secretary of Urumqi
- In office November 1999 – November 2006
- Preceded by: Wu Dunfu
- Succeeded by: Li Zhi

Personal details
- Born: January 1953 (age 73) Gaocheng, Hebei, China
- Party: Chinese Communist Party (expelled)
- Education: Xinjiang University; Central Party School of the Chinese Communist Party

Yang Gang (simplified Chinese: 杨刚; traditional Chinese: 楊剛; pinyin: Yáng Gāng; born January 1953) is a former Chinese politician. Between 2010 and 2013 Yang served as the deputy director of the General Administration of Quality Supervision, Inspection and Quarantine (AQSIQ). Between 1999 and 2010, he was a top regional official in Xinjiang Uyghur Autonomous Region, serving first as the Communist Party Secretary of regional capital Urumqi and then Deputy Secretary of the Xinjiang regional Party Committee.

== Biography ==
Yang was born in Gaocheng County, Hebei in January 1953, near the city of Shijiazhuang. He followed his father Yang Zhaocai to Xinjiang where the family lived at and worked for the Xinjiang Production and Construction Corps (XPCC). Yang's father was a human resources official with the XPCC. Beginning in 1969, he performed agricultural labour for the XPCC; he remained there for much of the Cultural Revolution.

Yang entered Xinjiang University in September 1978 after the resumption of the National College Entrance Examination, majoring in political theory, where he graduated in August 1982. After graduation, he continued to work in Xinjiang, where he entered the Communist Youth League organization of the XPCC. Yang was further educated in political theory at the Central Party School of the Chinese Communist Party from September 1986 to July 1989.

In October 1993, he was named deputy party chief of Turpan (department-level). In November 1999 he was promoted to become the Party Secretary of Urumqi, capital of Xinjiang, and a year later, a member of the Xinjiang Autonomous Region Party Standing Committee. He was said to possess immense power in Xinjiang largely because he grew up and lived in the region for most of his life and had an extensive network of contacts. He held the position of party chief of Urumqi until November 2006.

In November 2006, he was appointed the Deputy Secretary of the CPC Xinjiang Committee, he remained in that position until December 2010, when he was transferred to Beijing and appointed the vice-chairman of General Administration of Quality Supervision, Inspection and Quarantine. He served in the post until July 2013. In 2013, Yang was selected to become a member of the Chinese People's Political Consultative Conference, and sat on its economics committee as a vice chair.

On December 27, 2013, Yang was detained for investigation by the Central Commission for Discipline Inspection of the Chinese Communist Party for "serious violations of laws and regulations". On December 30, Yang was dismissed from his position for corruption. On July 11, 2014, at the conclusion of the CCDI investigation, Yang was accused of abuse of power, taking "massive bribes", and adultery, and was expelled from the Chinese Communist Party. On January 20, 2016, Yang Gang was sentenced to 12 years in jail for taking bribes worth 12.16 million yuan (~$2.0 million), $11,000 in U.S. dollars, and other assets worth 1.56 million yuan.

Yang was a member of the 11th National People's Congress and an alternate member of 16th and 17th Central Committee of the Chinese Communist Party.

Party political offices
| Preceded by Wu Dunfu | Communist Party Secretary of Urumqi; 1999–2006 | Succeeded by Li Zhi |
