= Early Light =

Hong Kong and Chinese toy company

- Type: private
- Industry: ODM, OEM
- Founded: 1972
- Headquarters: Early Light International Ctr, 9 Ka Fu Close, Sheung Shui, Hong Kong, China
- Number of locations: Shenzhen, Shaoguan
- Key people: Francis Choi Chee Ming, Carmen Choi
- Products: Toys, consumer goods
- Number of employees: 80,000 (2008)
- Subsidiaries: Early Light Industrial Co., Ltd.
- Website: Official site

Early Light International (Holdings) Ltd. (旭日國際控股有限公司), through its subsidiary, Early Light Industrial Co., Limited 旭日實業有限公司, is the largest manufacturer of toys in the world and is a significant player in the consumer products sector. The company was founded by current CEO and chairman, Dr. Francis Choi.

== General history ==
Early Light Industrial Co., Limited is a toy manufacturer founded by current CEO and chairman, Dr. Francis Choi in 1972. Early Light International (Holdings) Limited is the holding company of Early Light Industrial and was founded in 1994. The company is based in Sheung Shui, Hong Kong.

Early Light is a private company that specialises as an original equipment manufacturer and original design manufacturer of toys and consumer products and has done so for nearly 40 years. Product lines manufactured include products marketed to adults and children and range from simple moulded figurines to highly sophisticated electronic robots. Headquartered in Hong Kong with manufacturing facilities situated in Shenzhen and Shaoguan, Early Light Industrial was one of the first to relocate manufacturing facilities across the border to China from Hong Kong in 1983, hiring 3000 workers. After hiring locally in an effort to employ relocated ethnic workers, Early Light Industrial employs more than 80,000 people working in Hong Kong and in its plants in neighbouring Guangdong.

Since its inception, Early Light Industrial has developed relationships with major toy sellers such as Mattel, Lionel, and Hasbro, and has grown to an organisation that employs over 70,000 employees during peak production periods in factories that total more than 20 million square feet.

== Manufacturing facilities ==
=== History ===
In 1972, the first factory was located in the Kwun Tong industrial area of Hong Kong. In 1984, the Xinnán factory was opened across the border in Shenzhen, with 500 employees. In 1991, Woha factory, with 800,000 square feet (74,000 m^{2}) and 10,000 employees, was opened in Shenzhen, Guangdong. In 1994, Renwu factory, a plant with 1,200,000 square feet (110,000 m^{2}) and 12,000 employees, was opened in Shenzhen. In 1997, the company established the 2,500,000 square feet (230,000 m^{2}) Shanha factory in Shenzhen with 10,000 employees. These plants were certified ISO9001:2000 in 1999.

In 2006, a 20,000,000 square feet (1,900,000 m^{2}) factory located in Wujiang District of Shaoguan, was opened, employing 8,000 staff.

=== Today ===
Early Light Industrial Co., Limited operates two manufacturing facilities, one in Shenzhen and one in Shaoguan. Combined, these facilities cover an area of approximately 25 million square feet, and have the capacity to accommodate over 450 assembly lines and 70,000 skilled workers at their peak. Early Light Industrial’s Shaoguan factory, located in Wujiang District, employs some 20,000 workers. In 2010, its plants were awarded ISO9001:2008.

In addition to in-house capacity, Early Light Industrial solicited contractors to produce more than 40% of its products, as at 2006. To better control manufacturing process and quality, Early Light Industrial has progressively reduced its dependence on sub-contractors to less than 25%. The company declared that it intends to eliminate the need for sub-contractors altogether and handle all of its production in-house, under one roof.

== 2007 Mattel recall ==
In 2007, toy cars supplied to Mattel by Early Light were subject to a HK$1 million product recall when they were found to contain lead. It was subsequently discovered that the source of lead was the unauthorised paint used by one of its subcontractors. An Early Light spokesman said at the time: "We discovered [the subcontractor] didn't turn up to fetch the paint in April and May, so we did a lab test on the toy cars. We reported to Mattel when we saw there were problems." Mattel absolved Early Light from blame caused by the substitution of dangerous paint by the subcontractor, Hong Li Da.

== Staff relations ==
According to the company, Early Light Industrial ensures the welfare of its employees by managing factories in compliance with the CARE process of the International Council of Toy Industries (ICTI); it contributes to local relief funds during times of crisis and research and social development foundations. Nevertheless, the company's Shaoguan factory became the focus of world attention when it was the centre of a factory brawl which, according to official sources, killed 2 and injured 118 people, most of whom were Uyghurs, and which has been widely cited as the incident that resulted in street protests, and subsequently riots, in the Xinjiang capital of Ürümqi in July 2009. The factory, located in Wujiang District, employs some 16,000 workers. At the behest of the Guangdong authorities, it hired 800 workers from Kashgar, as part of an ethnic program which relocated 200,000 young Uyghurs since the start of 2008.

In a report about the company's Shenzhen factory in 2008, China Labor Watch alleged that workers at the Shaoguan factory, where the Uyghurs were employed, earned 28 yuan per day compared to 41.3 yuan in its factory in Shenzhen. Li Qiang, the executive director of China Labor Watch said the low pay, long hours, and poor working conditions, combined with the inability of Uyghur workers to communicate with their Han colleagues, exacerbated deeply held mistrust between the groups, and sparked the deadly brawl in June 2009.
