= Now Business News Channel =

Hong Kong based finance news channel

now Business News Channel
- Country: China
- Broadcast area: Hong Kong; International (via Internet)

Ownership
- Owner: Pacific Century Cyberworks

History
- Launched: 20 March 2006

Links
- Website: finance.now.com

now Business News Channel is a 24-hour finance news channel. It is now TV's first self-produced channel, which was launched at 9 a.m. on 20 March 2006. The broadcast centre is located in Wanchai, Hong Kong. There is also a broadcast centre in the Hong Kong Stock Exchange. In addition to live broadcast, there is a one-hour delay stock ticker. In addition to finance and business-related news, there are talk-show programmes. RTHK programmes are also shown on the weekend. On 20 September 2010, the now Business News Channel has undergone reforms (mainly by adding frosting to the windows of the now Business News Channel 's live room), and at the same time the now News ' s data display has been changed. In the early days of the reform, the end of the financial program was mistakenly changed to "now News production."

All programmes are recorded using Sony XDCAM and stored on Blu-ray discs.

It won a Peabody Award in 2009 for Sichuan Earthquake: One Year On because it "refused to forget, refused to ignore crucial questions".

== See also ==
- now TV (Hong Kong)
- Now International
