= 2008 Uyghur unrest =

Communal violence in Xinjiang, China

Xinjiang Uyghur Autonomous Region in red

The 2008 Uyghur unrest is a loose name for incidents of communal violence by Uyghur people in Hotan and Qaraqash county of Western China, with incidents in March, April, and August 2008. The protests were spurred by the death in police custody of Mutallip Hajim.

The authorities attribute most of unrest activities of the last years to groups like the Hizb ut-Tahrir al-Islami (Islamic Party of Liberation) or the East Turkestan Islamic Movement.

== Incidents ==
According to reports, on 18 March 2008, an/a Uyghur woman detonated a bomb on a city bus in Urumqi, escaping before the explosion. While officials denied the incident, the International Herald Tribune reported of residents confirming the bombing. Many businesses belonging to those that belong to the Muslim ethnic group Hui were destroyed by the separatist group.

On 23 March 2008, Muslim Uyghurs held anti-government protests in the far western region of Xinjiang, China. Chinese officials blamed separatists inspired by the 2008 Tibetan unrest. Demonstrators took to the streets at the weekly bazaar in Hotan. The authorities maintain tight controls on information from the area and reports of deaths or their denial could not be independently verified.

Demonstrations followed the death in custody of a wealthy Uyghur jade trader and philanthropist, Mutallip Hajim, 38. The protesters, who according to several accounts numbered around 600, began their march at the Lop bus station. An unknown number of men joined their 2 km (1.2 mi) march to the Big Bazaar shopping area, where they were surrounded by police who arrested around 400. The New York Times reported that the demonstrators were hoisting banners and shouting pro-independence slogans before the police forces moved in.

On 23 March and 24 March 2008, as many as 1,000 people in Hotan and Karakax County took to the streets in protest. The protests coincided with unrest in Tibet, but the motivations appeared to be local. One issue that reportedly brought locals to the streets in protest was a government ban on women wearing headscarfs. Another issue was the death of Mutallip Hajim. Alim Seytoff, head of the World Uyghur Congress, stated that, "The Uighurs began protesting after the killing of Mutallip Hajim, who had died in police custody." This claim was echoed by unnamed sources in a Radio Free Asia report. Local police and the government run religious affairs department refused to comment on Hajim's death when contacted by Agence France-Presse.

Police arrested 70 people from Uyghur ethnic group in the Silk Road oasis city of Kashgar on 3 April, fearing trouble when the Olympic torch passes through the city in June, The Guardian reported.

Residents of townships and villages near Gulja, a city in northwestern Xinjiang, said that about 25 Uyghurs were arrested on 4 April on a tip that people in the area were making bombs.

On 4 August 2008, two men attacked a police post near the city of Kashgar. They threw two improvised explosive devices and attacked at the police with knives. According to the government news agency, 16 policemen died and another 16 were injured.

On 10 August 2008, in the oasis town of Kuqa, a series of explosions and shootings were reported. The explosions occurred at various police stations and office buildings. The events claimed 12 deaths, ten of which were of the attackers themselves.

On 12 August 2008, unidentified men assaulted civilian guards with knives in Yamanya Town, leaving three dead and one critically injured.

On 28 August 2008, a group of policemen were attacked by six to seven attackers with knives in the town of Qizilboy in Payzawat County, resulting in the death two ethnic Uyghur police officers and at least two other policemen were critically injured. According to the deputy Peyzawat county police chief, Omerjan, the police officers who are all ethnic Uyghurs who were searching a cornfield following a tip that a woman suspected of aiding assailants in the Yamanya attack was hiding there.

== See also ==
- East Turkestan independence movement
- East Turkestan Islamic Movement
- Rebiya Kadeer
- 2008 Tibetan unrest
- July 2009 Ürümqi riots
- 2013 Xinjiang unrest
