= Mutallip Hajim =

Uyghur businessman and philanthropist (died 2008)

Mutallip Hajim (died 2008) was a prominent Uyghur businessman and philanthropist from the Xinjiang province in western China, who died while in police custody.

== Life ==
Hajim was a wealthy Uyghur jade trader and philanthropist. In January 2008, Hajim was taken into custody by police in Hotan. On 3 March 2008, Hajim's body was returned to his family. Police instructed his family to bury him immediately and inform no one of his death. Hajim was 38 at the time of his death.

== March 2008 Xinjiang protests ==
From 23 March 2008 to 24 March 2008, as many as 1,000 people in Hotan and Karakax County took to the streets in protest. The protests coincided with unrest in Tibet, but the motivations appeared to be local. One issue that reportedly brought locals to the streets in protest was a government ban on women wearing headscarves, and another was Mutallip Hajim's death. Alim Seytoff, head of the World Uyghur Congress, stated that, "The Uighurs began protesting after the killing of Mutallip Hajim, who had died in police custody." This claim was echoed by unnamed sources in a Radio Free Asia report. Local police and the government run religious affairs department refused to comment on Hajim's death when contacted by Agence France-Presse.

== See also ==
- Rebiya Kadeer
- East Turkestan independence movement
