= Francis Choi =

Hong Kong businessman (born 1945)

Francis Choi Chee Ming
- Born: 蔡志明; Choi Chee-ming; 1945 (age 80–81); Jieyang, Guangdong, China
- Occupations: Founder and chairman, Early Light International (Holdings) Ltd.
- Known for: Toy manufacturer, and property developer
- Spouse: Lee Wai-lei
- Children: 3, including Karson Choi

Chinese name
- Chinese: 蔡志明
Transcriptions
Standard Mandarin
- Hanyu Pinyin: Cai Zhiming
- Website: www.earlylight.com.hk

Francis Choi Chee-ming, GBS, JP (Chinese: 蔡志明; born 1945) is a Hong Kong businessman and billionaire. As of March 2022, his net worth is estimated at US$8.1 billion.

Choi is the founder and chairman of Early Light International (Holdings) Ltd., the largest manufacturer of toys in the world. He is nicknamed "the King of Toys". Choi is self-made, having started his professional life as a toy salesman, and is ranked 11th on the Forbes list of Hong Kong's 50 richest people, and No.283 in the world in 2022.

== Early life ==
Choi was born in Guangdong Province, but grew up in Hong Kong.

== Career ==
In 1972, Choi was a 25-year-old toy salesman opened his first toy factory. Within five years, his business had grown to 300 employees. He began his relationship with toy giant, Mattel, Inc. during his first decade in business. Before long, his company was manufacturing Snoopy merchandise for Mattel.

Choi is a member of the Chinese People's Political Consultative Conference. He is Chairman of Early Light International (Holdings) Ltd., the company he founded.

He also owns sizeable stakes in listed companies Town Health International and Regal Hotels International, as well as being vice-chairman of the Regal board. Choi is an avid watch collector, and also owns a chain of watch retailers.

== Personal life ==
Choi has three children. He and his wife, live in Hong Kong. His daughter-in-law is model Irene Wang. Choi collects cars, watches and horses.

Order of precedence
Preceded by Kevin Ho; Recipients of the Gold Bauhinia Star	Hong Kong order of precedence Recipients of the Gold Bauhinia Star	Succeeded by Alice Tai; Recipients of the Gold Bauhinia Star
