= Shaoguan Incident =

Lynching of Uyghurs in Guangdong, China

- Location: Shaoguan, Guangdong, China
- Date: 25–26 June 2009
- Deaths: At least 2 Uyghurs
- Injuries: 118

The Shaoguan Incident (Chinese: 韶关事件) was a civil disturbance which took place overnight on 25–26 June 2009 in Guangdong, China. A violent dispute erupted between migrant Uyghurs and Han Chinese workers at a toy factory in Shaoguan as a result of a dispute about a Han woman. Groups of Han Chinese set upon Uyghur co-workers, leading to at least two Uyghurs being violently killed by angry Han Chinese men (although other reports indicate a higher death toll), and some 118 people injured, most of them Uyghurs.

The event was widely cited as the cause of the July 2009 Ürümqi riots, which some believe began as a peaceful street protest demanding official action over the two Uyghurs who were killed in Shaoguan. Following trials in October 2009, one person was executed and several others sentenced to terms between life imprisonment and five to seven years.

== Background ==
The factory where the incident took place is the Xuri Toy Factory (Chinese: 旭日玩具厂; lit. 'Early Light Toy Factory'), owned by Hong Kong-based Early Light International (Holdings) Ltd., the largest toy manufacturer in the world. The company's Shaoguan factory in the Wujiang district employs some 16,000 workers. At the behest of the Guangdong authorities, it hired 800 workers from Kashgar, in Xinjiang as part of an ethnic program which relocated 200,000 young Uyghurs since the start of 2008. According to The Guardian, most workers sign a one- to three-year contract then travel to factory dormitories in the south. Their salaries range from 1,000 yuan to 1,400 yuan a month (which is higher than their local income), and many get free board and lodging. Most of these Uyghurs are away from home to work for the first time. The New York Times quoted Xinjiang Daily saying in May that 70 percent of the young Uyghurs had "signed up for employment voluntarily."

An official in charge of ethnic and religious affairs in Guangdong said that the province had hired Uyghurs, aged from 18 to 29, in May. A small group of Uyghurs arrived on 2 May, and workers at the factory remarked that relations between the two groups deteriorated as the number of Uyghurs increased. State media confirmed that all the workers were from Shufu County. China Labor Watch reported that workers at the Shaoguan factory, where the Uyghurs were employed, earned 28 yuan per day compared with 41.3 yuan in its factory in Shenzhen. They noted that rights of workers, Han and Uyghur alike, were frequently violated by verbal abuse from factory supervisors, unpaid overtime, poor dormitory conditions and illegal labor contracts. Li Qiang, executive director of China Labor Watch said that low pay, long hours and poor working conditions combined with the inability to communicate with their colleagues exacerbated the existing mistrust between the Han and Uyghurs.

== Causes and events ==
Overnight on 25–26 June, tensions flared at the factory, leading to a full-blown ethnic brawl between Uyghurs and Han Chinese. As a result of the fighting, 2 Uyghurs were killed and 118 were injured, 16 of them seriously. Of the injured, 79 were Uyghurs and 39 were Han. 400 police and 50 anti-riot vehicles were mobilized.

Official sources state that the rioting began at around 2 am, and there were reports that they lasted until at least 4:30 am, when police arrived. An initial disturbance was reported at around 11 pm when security guards responded to a call for help by a female worker who felt intimidated by several chanting male Uyghurs. Two dozen Han workers armed with batons and metal rods then responded; they called for backup using their phones.

Uyghurs maintained that the attacks started after the night shift at around 12:30 am, when Han mobs stormed into Uyghur dormitories and started indiscriminate and unprovoked beatings. Amateur videos posted online showed brutal attacks, and Han chasing Uyghurs through the dorm floors. One man said that he saw that security had been overwhelmed by the arrival of outside gangs; he said it was common knowledge that the outsiders brought in machetes. Han and Uyghur witnesses interviewed by the foreign press thought the casualties had been understated by the authorities: a Han claimed to have killed seven or eight Uyghurs; Uyghurs cited "merciless" assaults on those already in ambulances. The rioting stopped soon after the police arrived. A policeman explained their delay in arriving at the scene due to difficulties in assembling enough officers. The two dead men were later named as Aximujiang Aimaiti and Sadikejiang Kaze, both from Xinjiang.

=== Rape rumors ===
The rioting was sparked by allegations of sexual assault on Han women by Uyghurs, and rumors of an incident in which two female Han workers were sexually assaulted by six Uyghur co-workers at the factory, according to Voice of America. The authorities said that the rumors were false, and had been initiated by a disgruntled former co-worker. Xinhua said that a man surnamed Zhu "faked the information to express his discontent" over failing to find new work after quitting his job at the factory.

== Responses ==
Police said that their investigations found no evidence that a rape had taken place. Shaoguan government spokesman Wang Qinxin, called it "a very ordinary incident," which he said had been exaggerated to foment unrest. The Guardian reported that video of the riots and photographs of the victims were quickly circulated on the internet by Uyghur exile groups, along with claims that the death toll was under-reported and the police were slow to act; protests in Ürümqi were assembled by email. Xinhua reported that Guangdong authorities had arrested two people who are suspected of having spread rumors online which alleged sexual assault of Han women had taken place. In addition, it reported on 7 July 2009 that 13 suspects had been taken into custody following the incident, of which three were Uyghurs from Xinjiang. Xinhua quoted 23-year-old Huang Jiangyuan saying that he was angry at being turned down for a job in June at the toy factory, and thus posted an article at a forum on sg169.com on 16 June which alleged six Xinjiang men had raped two women at the Xuri Toy Factory; Huang Zhangsha, 19, was detained for writing on his online chat space on 28 June that eight Xinjiang people had died in the factory fight. Kang Zhijian, vice director with the Shaoguan public security bureau, said that the offenders would face up to 15 days in administrative detention.

On 8 July 2009, Xinhua released an interview with Huang Cuilian, the "Han girl" whose alleged rape triggered the disturbances. The 19-year-old trainee from rural Guangdong, who had worked at the factory less than two months, said: "I was lost and entered the wrong dormitory and screamed when I saw those Uyghur young men in the room... I just felt they were unfriendly so I turned and ran." She recounted how one of them stood up and stamped his feet as if to chase her. "I later realized that he was just making fun of me." She said she only found out hours later that she was the cause of the violence.

Shaoguan authorities moved the Uyghur workers to temporary accommodation, and the workers were transferred on 7 July to another facility belonging to Early Light, 30 km away in Baitu town. The Baitu factory is now reported to be a Uyghur enclave, with, sporting facilities, canteen serving Xinjiang food, a round-the-clock staff clinic, and plain-clothed police officers in their midst. According to the South China Morning Post, the Kashgar staff were apparently unable to mix with colleagues in their previous location because of the language barrier – a local shop worker estimated that less than one in three spoke Mandarin. Two months on, the South China Morning Post found few willing to talk about the events of the fateful night. The authorities' claims that 50 Uyghur workers were granted their repatriation requests following the violence are contested by Uyghur workers.

Abdukeyum Muhammat, deputy secretary of Xinjiang kanji Prefectural Committee of the Communist Party, led a working team to Shaoguan on 27 June. Zhou Yongkang, Politburo Standing Committee member responsible for security, reportedly visited Shaoguan in early September 2009. On 5 August, Xinhua reported that Chinese police had arrested Kurban Khayum, a chef at an Arabic restaurant in Guangzhou who they claimed confessed to being an agent for the World Uygur Congress (WUC) and who allegedly spread rumors that were later used as a pretext to trigger the Ürümqi riots of 5 July. Xinhua alleged that he had fabricated a report that "the factory brawl had caused the death of 17 to 18 people, including three females," which he sent in an email to Rebiya Kadeer.

At a trial on 10 October at Shaoguan Intermediate People's Court, Xiao Jianhua was sentenced to death for being the "principal instigator" of the violence and Xu Qiqi was given a life sentence for manslaughter; three other people were sentenced to seven to eight years for assault. On the same day, the People's Court of Wujiang District, Shaoguan, jailed three more Han workers and three Uyghurs for participating in the brawl; they were sentenced to five to seven years imprisonment.
