= July 2009 Ürümqi riots =

Protest events in Xinjiang, China

- Part of the Xinjiang conflict
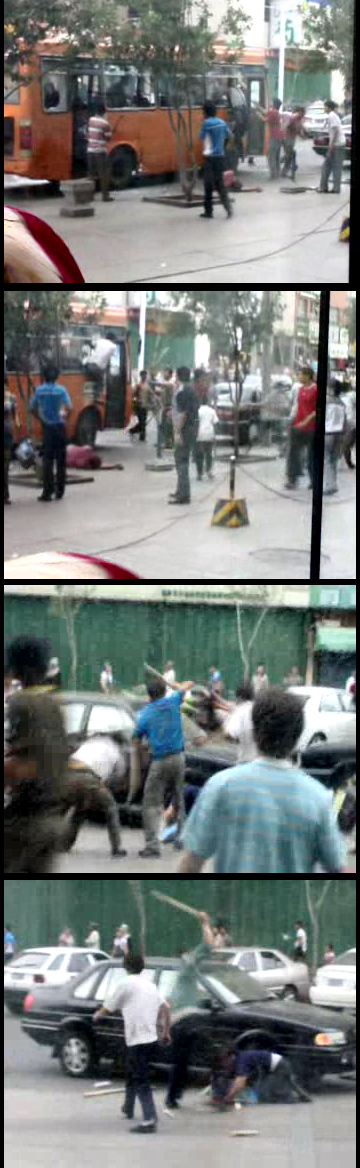
- Rioters besieging a bus in Tianshan, Ürümqi, attacking escaping Han passengers with sticks.
- Date: 5–8 July 2009
- Location: Ürümqi, Xinjiang, China
- Caused by: Anger over the Shaoguan incident
- Methods: Rioting, arson, robbery
- Result: Riots quelled: Internet access within Ürümqi restricted until 2010; Hundreds of rioters arrested, dozens sentenced to death; Incidents including syringe attacks continue into September

Parties
Uyghur rioters World Uyghur Congress (alleged)	Han and Hui counter-rioters	Government of China: Ministry of Public Security; People's Police; People's Armed Police

Lead figures
Rebiya Kadeer (alleged)		Hu Jintao; Wang Lequan; Nur Bekri

Number
3,000+	1,000+	1,000+

Casualties
- Deaths: 197+
- Injuries: 1,721
- Arrested: 1,500+
- Charged: 400+

Chinese name
- Simplified Chinese: 乌鲁木齐七五骚乱
- Traditional Chinese: 烏魯木齊七五騷亂
- Literal meaning: Ürümqi 5 July riots
Transcriptions
Standard Mandarin
- Hanyu Pinyin: Wūlǔmùqí qī-wǔ sāoluàn
- Bopomofo: ㄨㄌㄨˇㄇㄨˋㄑㄧˊ 7·5 ㄙㄠㄌㄨㄢˋ
Wu
- Romanization: U^{平} lu^{上} moh^{入} zi^{平} 7·5 sau^{平} loe^{去}
Hakka
- Romanization: Vu^{24} lu^{24} mug^{2} ce^{11} 7·5 so^{55} lon^{55}
Yue: Cantonese
- Jyutping: Wu^{1}lou^{5}muk^{6}cai^{4} cat^{1}-ng^{5} sou^{1}lyun^{6}
Southern Min
- Hokkien POJ: oo-lóo-bo̍k-tsè 7·5 so-luān

Official name
- Simplified Chinese: 乌鲁木齐七五打砸抢烧杀严重暴力犯罪事件
- Traditional Chinese: 烏魯木齊七五打砸搶燒殺嚴重暴力犯罪事件
- Literal meaning: Ürümqi 5 July violent criminal incident of beating, smashing, looting, and burning
Transcriptions
Standard Mandarin
- Hanyu Pinyin: Wūlǔmùqí qī-wǔ dǎ zá qiǎng shāo shā yánzhòng bàolì fànzuì shìjiàn

Uyghur name
- Uyghur: بەشىنچى ئىيۇل ۋەقەسى
- Literal meaning: 5 July incident
Transcriptions
- Latin Yëziqi: Beshinchi iyul weqesi

A series of violent riots over several days broke out on 5 July 2009 in Ürümqi, the capital city of the Xinjiang Uyghur Autonomous Region, in northwestern China. The first day's rioting, which involved at least 1,000 Uyghurs, began as a protest, but escalated into violent attacks that mainly targeted Han people. According to Chinese state media, a total of 197 people died, most of whom were Han people or non-Muslim minorities, with 1,721 others injured and many vehicles and buildings destroyed.

Rioting began following the Shaoguan incident, where false accusations of rape of a Han woman by Uyghur men led to a brawl between ethnic Han and Uyghur factory workers in Shaoguan, resulting in the deaths of two Uyghurs who were both from Xinjiang. The Chinese government stated that the riots were planned from abroad by the World Uyghur Congress (WUC) accused its leader Rebiya Kadeer of masterminding the violence.

When the riots began, telephone and internet connections within Xinjiang were cut off. In the weeks that followed, official sources reported that over 1,000 people were arrested and detained; Uyghur-run mosques were temporarily closed. Many Uyghurs reportedly disappeared during wide-scale police sweeps in the days following the riots. The communication limitations and armed police presence remained in place as of January 2010. By November 2009, over 400 individuals faced criminal charges for their actions during the riots. Nine were executed in November 2009. According to China News Service, they were executed for crimes such as murder or arson. By February 2010, at least 26 had received death sentences.

== Background ==
Xinjiang is a large central-Asian region within the People's Republic of China comprising numerous ethnic groups. Its two largest ethnic groups are the Uyghurs and Han, who make up 45 and 40 per cent of the population, respectively. Its heavily industrialised capital, Ürümqi, has a population of more than 2.3 million, about 75 per cent of whom are Han, 12.8 per cent are Uyghur, and 10 per cent are from other ethnic groups.

During the Qing Dynasty, the Qianlong Emperor had ordered the genocide of Dzungar tribe to punish their leader Amursana for rebelling against Qing rule. After the genocide of Dzungar people, the Qing empire had sponsored Han, Hui, Uyghur, Xibe, and Kazakh colonists in settling into the region, which resulted in a major regional demographic change, with 62 percent Uyghurs concentrated in the southern Xinjiang's Tarim Basin, and around 30 percent Han and Hui people in the north. Professor Stanley W. Toops noted that today's demographic situation is similar to that of the early Qing period in Xinjiang. At the start of the 19th century, 40 years after the Qing reconquest of the area, there were around 155,000 Han and Hui Chinese in Xinjiang and somewhat more than twice that number of Uyghurs. A census of Xinjiang under Qing rule in the early 19th century tabulated ethnic shares of the population as 30% Han and 60% Turkic, while it dramatically shifted to 6% Han and 75% Uyghur in the 1953 census. However, the recorded population, which had increased to 18.64 million people, was 40.57% Han and 45.21% Uyghur by 2000.

Since the incorporation of the region into the People's Republic of China, there have been armed conflicts between the Chinese government and separatist groups, the latter receiving support from the Soviet Union during the Sino-Soviet split during the 1960s. Insurgency and hostilities increased following the Barin uprising and continued throughout the 1990s, marked by events such as the 1997 Ürümqi bus bombings and the Ghulja incident. The state-sponsored migration of Han from the 1950s to the 1970s and harsh responses to separatism have contributed to regional tensions. The conflict saw a resurgence since the 2000s marked by terror attacks and armed clashes. In 2008, there was a wave of attacks and incidents preceding the Olympic Games in Beijing.

According to Chinese government policy, Uyghurs are classified as a National Minority rather than an indigenous group—in other words, they are considered to be no more indigenous to Xinjiang than the Han, and have no special rights to the land under the law. Although the Chinese government's minority policy, which is based on affirmative action, has reinforced a Uyghur ethnic identity that is distinct from the Han population, some scholars argue that Beijing unofficially favours a monolingual, monocultural model that is based on the majority. The authorities also crack down on any activity that appears to constitute separatism. These policies, in addition to long-standing cultural differences, have sometimes resulted in "resentments" between Uyghur and Han citizens. On one hand, as a result of Han immigration and government policies, Uyghurs' freedoms of religion and of movement are curtailed, while some Uyghurs argue that the government downplays their history and traditional culture. On the other hand, some Han citizens view Uyghurs as benefiting from special treatment, such as preferential admission to universities and exemption from the one-child policy, and as "harbouring separatist aspirations".

=== Immediate causes ===
Shaoguan, the location of the incident that sparked protests in July 2009. Ürümqi is marked in green.

The riots took place several days after a violent incident in Shaoguan, Guangdong, where many migrant workers are employed as part of a government programme to alleviate labour shortages. According to state media, a disgruntled former worker disseminated rumours in late June that two Han women had been raped by six Uyghur men. Overnight on 25–26 June, tensions at the Guangdong factory led to a full-blown ethnic brawl between Uyghur and Han workers, during which two Uyghurs were killed. Official sources later said they found no evidence to support the rape allegation. While the official Xinhua News Agency reported that the person responsible for spreading the rumours had been arrested, Uyghurs alleged that the authorities had failed to protect the Uyghur workers, or to arrest any of the Han people involved in the brawl.

Videos of the brawl were circulated online by Uyghur exile groups, alongside claims that the death toll was underreported. A street protest in Ürümqi on 5 July was organised online to voice their discontent and to demand a full government investigation.

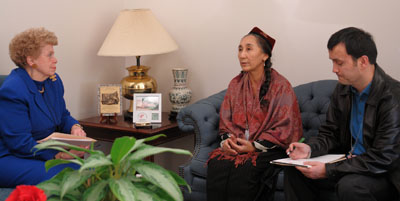
The Chinese government alleged that Rebiya Kadeer (centre) played a central role in instigating the riots.

At some point the demonstration became violent. The Xinjiang Corps of the People's Armed Police was deployed after reports of vandalism and arson came in. Captain Wan Jingang of the PAP Ürümqi Detachment was killed when rocks were thrown at the officers. A government statement called the riots a "pre-empted, organised violent crime ... instigated and directed from abroad, and carried out by outlaws." Nur Bekri, chairman of the Xinjiang regional government, said on 6 July that overseas separatist forces had taken advantage of the Shaoguan incident "to instigate the unrest [of 5 July] and undermine ethnic unity and social stability".

The government asserted that the World Uyghur Congress (WUC), an international organisation of exiled Uyghur groups led by Rebiya Kadeer, had instigated the riots over the internet, supporting its charge with evidence of WUC knowledge and involvement in protest planning, including Kadeer's public speeches after the Tibetan unrest and phone recordings in which she had reportedly said that something would happen in Ürümqi. Chinese authorities accused a man who they alleged to be a key WUC member of inciting ethnic tensions by circulating a violent video, and urging Uyghurs, in an online forum, to "fight back [against Han Chinese] with violence". Nick Holdstock interviewed a Uyghur who told him that on 3 July, Rebiya "called on Uyghurs to protest", with the message spreading on discussion boards and messagaging apps, and that he received a picture message showing the exact place and time of demonstration.

China Daily asserted that the riots were organised to fuel separatism and to benefit Middle East terrorist organisations. Kadeer denied fomenting the violence, and argued that the Ürümqi protests and their descent into violence were triggered by heavy policing, discontent over Shaoguan and "years of Chinese repression", rather than by the intervention of separatists or terrorists. Uyghur exile groups claimed that violence erupted when police used excessive force to disperse the crowd.

All parties, then, agree that the protests were organised beforehand; the main points of contention are whether the violence was planned or spontaneous, and whether the underlying tensions reflect separatist inclinations or a desire for social justice.

== Events ==
=== Initial demonstrations ===
Locations where protests and confrontations reportedly occurred

Demonstrations began on 5 July at 5:00 pm with a protest in the Grand Bazaar, a prominent tourist site, and crowd reportedly gathering at the People's Square area. Official and eyewitness accounts reported that the demonstration involved about 1,000 Uyghurs; the WUC said approximately 10,000 protesters took part.

At 7:00 pm, protesters began throwing rocks at the police and attacking passersby. The government's official line was that the violence was premeditated and coordinated by Uyghur separatists abroad. The local public security bureau said it found evidence that many Uyghurs had travelled from other cities to gather for the riot, and that they had begun preparing weapons two or three days before the riot. The World Uyghur Congress quickly issued press releases saying that the police had used deadly force and killed "scores" of protesters. Kadeer has claimed that there were agents provocateurs among the crowds.

=== Escalation and spread ===
After the confrontation with police turned violent, rioters began hurling rocks, smashing vehicles, breaking into shops and attacking Han civilians. At least 1,000 Uyghurs were involved in the rioting when it began, and the number of rioters may have risen to as many as 3,000. Jane Macartney of The Times characterised the first day's rioting as consisting mainly of "Han stabbed by marauding gangs of [Uyghurs]"; a report in The Australian several months later suggested that religiously moderate Uyghurs may also have been attacked by rioters. Although the majority of rioters were Uyghur, not all Uyghurs were violent during the riots; there are accounts of Han and Uyghur civilians helping each other escape the violence and hide. About 1,000 police officers were dispatched; they used batons, live ammunition, tasers, tear gas and water hoses to disperse the rioters and set up roadblocks and posted armoured vehicles throughout the city.

Footage of the first day's violence, captured on a witness' cell phone

During a press conference, Mayor Jirla Isamuddin said that at about 8:15 pm, some protesters started to fight and loot, overturned guardrails and smashed three buses before being dispersed. At 8:30 pm, violence escalated around South Jiefang Road and Longquan Street area, with rioters torching police patrol cars and attacking passers-by. Soon, between 700 and 800 people went from the People's Square to Daximen and Xiaoximen area, "fighting, smashing, looting, torching and killing" along the way. At 9:30 pm, the government received reports that three people had been killed and 26 injured, six of whom were police officers. Police reinforcements were dispatched to hotspots of Renmin Road, Nanmen, Tuanjie Road, Yan'An Road and South Xinhua Road. Police took control of the main roadways and commercial districts in the city at around 10 pm, but riots continued in side streets and alleyways, with Han civilians attacked and cars overturned or torched, according to the mayor. Police then formed small teams and "swept" the entire city for the next two days. A strict curfew was put in place; authorities imposed "comprehensive traffic control" from 9:00 pm on 7 July to 8:00 am 8 July "to avoid further chaos".

The official news agency, Xinhua, reported that police believed agitators were trying to organise more unrest in other areas in Xinjiang, such as Aksu and Yili Prefectures. Violent protests also sprang up in Kashgar, in southwestern Xinjiang, where the South China Morning Post reported many shops were closed, and the area around the mosque was sealed off by a People's Liberation Army platoon after confrontations.

Another clash was reported near the mosque on 7 July and an estimated 50 people were arrested. Up to 12,000 students at the Kashgar Teaching Institute were confined to campus after the 5 July riots, according to the Post. Many of the institute's students had apparently travelled to Ürümqi for the demonstrations there.

=== Casualties and damage ===
During the first hours of the rioting, state media only reported that three people had been killed. The number rose sharply, though, after the first night's rioting; at midday on 6 July, Xinhua announced that 129 people had died. In the following days the death toll reported by various government sources (including Xinhua and party officials) gradually grew, with the last official update on 18 July placing the tally at 197 dead and 1,721 injured. The World Uyghur Congress has claimed that the death toll was around 600.

Xinhua did not immediately disclose the ethnic breakdown of the dead, but journalists from The Times and The Daily Telegraph reported that most of the victims appeared to have been Han. For instance, on 10 July Xinhua stated that 137 of the dead (out of the total of 184 that was being reported at that time) were Han, 46 Uyghur, and 1 Hui. There were casualties among the rioters as well; for example, according to official accounts, a group of 12 rioters attacking civilians were shot by police. In the months following the riots, the government maintained that the majority of casualties were Han and hospitals said that two-thirds of the injured were Han, although the World Uyghur Congress claims that many Uyghurs were killed as well. According to the official count released by the Chinese government in August 2009, 134 of the 156 civilian victims were Han, 11 Hui, 10 Uyghur, and 1 Manchu. Uyghur advocates continue to question these figures, saying that the number of ethnic Uyghurs remains understated. Nevertheless, third-party sources confirm that most of the casualties were Han Chinese. Xinhua News Agency reported that 627 vehicles and 633 constructions were damaged.

The Ürümqi municipal government initially announced that it would pay ¥200,000 as compensation, plus another ¥10,000 as "funeral expense" for every "innocent death" caused by the riot. The compensation was later doubled to ¥420,000 per death. Mayor Jirla Isamuddin estimated that the compensations would cost at least ¥100 million.

=== After 5 July ===
Starting 6 July, Chinese security forces conducted numerous large-scale sweep operations the in Erdaoqiao and Saimachang districts, rounding up dozens of suspects in raids. By 7 July, officials reported that 1,434 suspected rioters had been arrested. A group of 200 to 300 Uyghur women assembled on 7 July to protest what they said was "indiscriminate" detention of Uyghur men; the protest led to a tense but non-violent confrontation with police forces. Kadeer claimed that "nearly 10,000 people" had gone missing overnight. Human Rights Watch later documented 43 cases of Uyghur men who disappeared after being detained in police raids, and said that this was likely to be "just the tip of the iceberg". Human Rights Watch alleges that young men, mostly in their 20s, had been unlawfully arrested and have not been seen or heard from as of 20 October 2009.

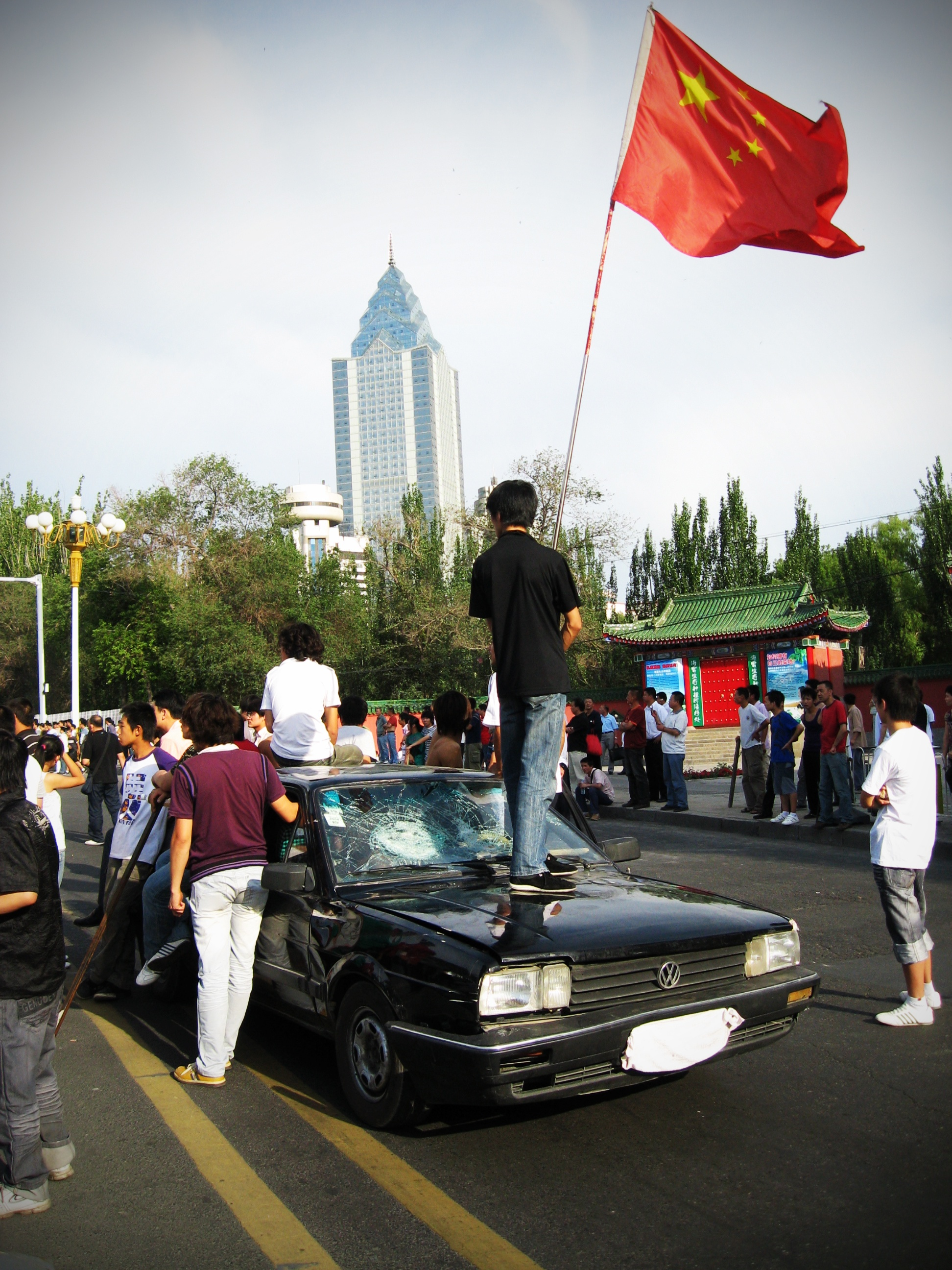
Armed Han groups during the riots

On 7 July, there were large-scale armed demonstrations by ethnic Han in Ürümqi. Conflicting estimates of the Han demonstrators' numbers were reported by the western media and varied from "hundreds" to as high as 10,000. The Times reported that smaller fights were frequently breaking out between Uyghurs and Han, and that groups of Han citizens had organised to take revenge on "Uyghur mobs". Police used tear gas and roadblocks in an attempt to disperse the demonstration, and urged Han citizens over loudspeakers to "calm down" and "let the police do their job". Li Zhi, party secretary of Ürümqi, stood on the roof of a police car with a megaphone appealing to the crowd to go home.

Mass protests had been quelled by 8 July, although sporadic violence was reported. In the days after the riots, "thousands" of people tried to leave the city, and the price for bus tickets rose as much as fivefold.

On 10 July, city authorities closed Ürümqi mosques "for public safety", saying it was too dangerous to have large gatherings and that holding Jumu'ah, traditional Friday prayers, could reignite tensions. Large crowds of Uyghurs gathered for prayer anyway, however, and police decided to let two mosques open to avoid having an "incident". After prayers at the White Mosque, several hundred people demonstrated over people detained after the riot, but were dispersed by riot police, with five or six people arrested.

Over 300 more people were reported arrested in early August. According to the BBC, the total number of arrests in connection with the riots was over 1,500. The Financial Times estimated that the number was higher, citing an insider saying that some 4,000 arrests had already taken place by mid July, and that Ürümqi's prisons were so full that newly arrested people were being held in a People's Liberation Army warehouse. According to the Uyghur American Association, several other Uyghur journalists and bloggers were also detained after the riots; one of them, journalist Gheyret Niyaz, was later sentenced to 15 years in prison for having spoken to foreign media. In the most high-profile case, Ilham Tohti, an ethnic Uyghur economist at Minzu University of China, was arrested two days after the riots over his criticisms of the Xinjiang government.

== Reactions and response ==
=== Domestic reaction ===
==== Communications black-out ====
Mobile phone service and internet access were limited both during and after the riots. China Mobile phone service was cut "to prevent the incident from spreading further". Outbound international calls throughout Xinjiang were blocked, and Internet connections in the region had been locked down or non-local websites blocked. Reporting from Ürümqi's Hoi Tak Hotel on 9 July, Al Jazeera reported that the foreign journalists' hotel was the only place in the city with Internet access, although the journalist could not send text messages or place international phone calls. Many unauthorised postings on local sites and Google were removed by censors; images and video footage of the demonstrations and rioting, however, were soon found posted on Twitter, YouTube, and Flickr. Many Xinjiang-based websites became inaccessible worldwide, and internet access within Ürümqi remained restricted nearly a year following the riots; it was not restored until 14 May 2010.

==== Government ====
Chinese state-controlled television broadcast graphic footage of cars being smashed and people being beaten. Officials reiterated the party line: XUAR chairman Nur Bekri delivered a lengthy address on the situation and on the Shaoguan incident, and claimed that the government of both Guangdong and Xinjiang had dealt with the deaths of the workers properly and with respect. Bekri further condemned the riots as "premeditated and planned"; Eligen Imibakhi, chairman of the Standing Committee of the Xinjiang Regional People's Congress, blamed 5 July riots on "extremism, separatism and terrorism".

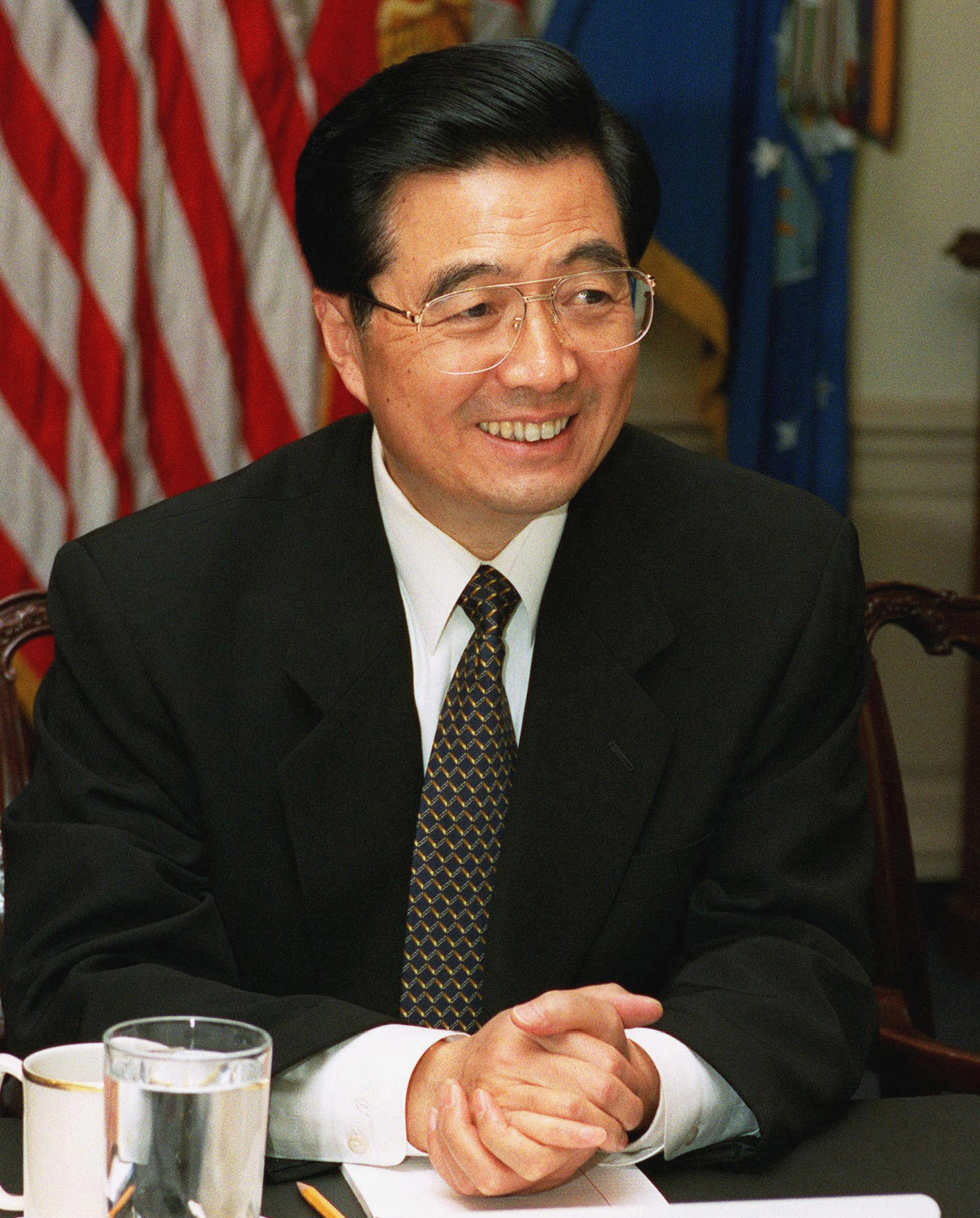
The riots prompted Chinese leader Hu Jintao to return from the international G8 summit early.

Chinese media covered the rioting extensively. Hours after troops stopped the rioting, the state invited foreign journalists on an official fact-finding trip to Ürümqi; journalists from more than 100 media organisations were all corralled into the downtown Hoi Tak Hotel, sharing 30 internet connections. Journalists were given unprecedented access to troublespots and hospitals. The Financial Times referred to this handling as an improvement, compared to the "public-relations disaster" of the Tibetan unrest in 2008.

In an effort to soothe tensions immediately after the riots, state media began a mass publicity campaign throughout Xinjiang extolling ethnic harmony. Local television programmes united Uyghur and Han singers in a chorus of "We are all part of the same family"; Uyghurs who "acted heroically" during the riots were profiled; loud-hailer trucks blasted slogans in the streets. A common slogan warned against the "Three Evils": terrorism, separatism and extremism.

Chinese President and General Secretary of the Communist Party Hu Jintao curtailed his attendance of the G8 summit in Italy, convened an emergency meeting of the Politburo, and dispatched Standing Committee member Zhou Yongkang to Xinjiang to "guid[e] stability-preservation work in Xinjiang". South China Morning Post reported a government source saying Beijing would re-evaluate the impact on arrangements for the country's forthcoming 60th anniversary celebrations in October. Guangdong's CPC Provincial Committee Secretary, Wang Yang, noted that the government policies towards ethnic minorities "definitely need adjustments", otherwise "there will be some problems." A security planner said the authorities planned to fly in more troops from other stations to raise the number of armed police presence to 130,000 before the 60th anniversary celebrations in October.

After the riots, the Chinese government exercised diplomatic pressure on nations that Kadeer was scheduled to visit. In late July, India declined Kadeer a visa "on the advice of Beijing", and Beijing summoned the Japanese ambassador in protest of a trip Kadeer made to Japan. When Kadeer visited Australia in August to promote a film about her life, China officially complained to the Australian government and asked for the film to be withdrawn.

==== Internet response ====
The response to the riots on the Chinese blogosphere was markedly more varied than the official response. Despite blocks and censorship, Internet watchers monitored continued attempts by netizens to publish their own thoughts on the causes of the incident or vent their anger about the violence. While some bloggers were supportive of the government, others were more reflective of the event's cause. On numerous forums and news sites, government workers quickly removed comments about the riots. Common themes were calls for punishment for those responsible; some posts evoked the name of Wang Zhen, a 20th-century general who is respected by the Han but feared by many Uyghurs for his repression in Xinjiang after the communist takeover of the region in 1949.

=== International reactions ===
==== Intergovernmental organisations ====
- United Nations: Secretary-General Ban Ki-moon urged all sides to exercise restraint, and called on China to take measures to protect the civilian population as well as respect the freedoms of citizens, including freedom of speech, assembly and information. Human rights chief Navi Pillay said she was "alarmed" over the high death toll, noting this was an "extraordinarily high number of people to be killed and injured in less than a day of rioting." She also said China must treat detainees humanely in a way that adheres to international norms.
- Shanghai Cooperation Organisation: said it sympathised with the family members of those innocent people killed in the riot; it said that its member states regard Xinjiang as an inalienable part of the People's Republic of China and believe the situation in Xinjiang is purely China's internal affairs. Russian Foreign Minister Sergey Lavrov condemned rioters for "Using separatist slogans and provoking ethnic intolerance. Officials from both neighbouring Kazakhstan and Kyrgyzstan said they were braced for "an influx of refugees" and tightened border controls. Despite the Kazakh government support, over 5,000 Uyghurs protested on 19 July in former capital Almaty against Chinese police use of deadly force against the rioters.
- Organisation of the Islamic Conference: decried the "disproportionate use of force", calling on the Chinese government to "bring those responsible to justice swiftly" and urging China to find a solution to the unrest by examining why it had erupted.
- European Union: leaders expressed concern, and urged the Chinese government to show restraint in dealing with the protests: German Chancellor Angela Merkel urged respect for the rights of minorities; Italian President Giorgio Napolitano brought up human rights at a press conference with Hu Jintao, and said that "economic and social progress that is being achieved in China places new demands in terms of human rights."

==== Countries ====
Turkey, a Turkic-majority country with a significant Uyghur minority, officially expressed "deep sadness" and urged the Chinese authorities to bring the perpetrators to justice. Turkish Prime Minister Recep Tayyip Erdoğan said the incident was "like genocide", while Turkish Trade and Industry Minister Nihat Ergün unsuccessfully called for a boycott on Chinese goods. Several protests against the Chinese government's response to the riots also occurred in front of Chinese embassies and consulates in Turkey. The Turkish government's stance sparked a significant outcry from Chinese media.

Afghanistan, Cambodia and Vietnam said they believed the Chinese government was "taking appropriate measures," and their statements backed "the territorial integrity and sovereignty of China." Micronesian Vice-president Alik Alik condemned the riots as a "terrorist act."

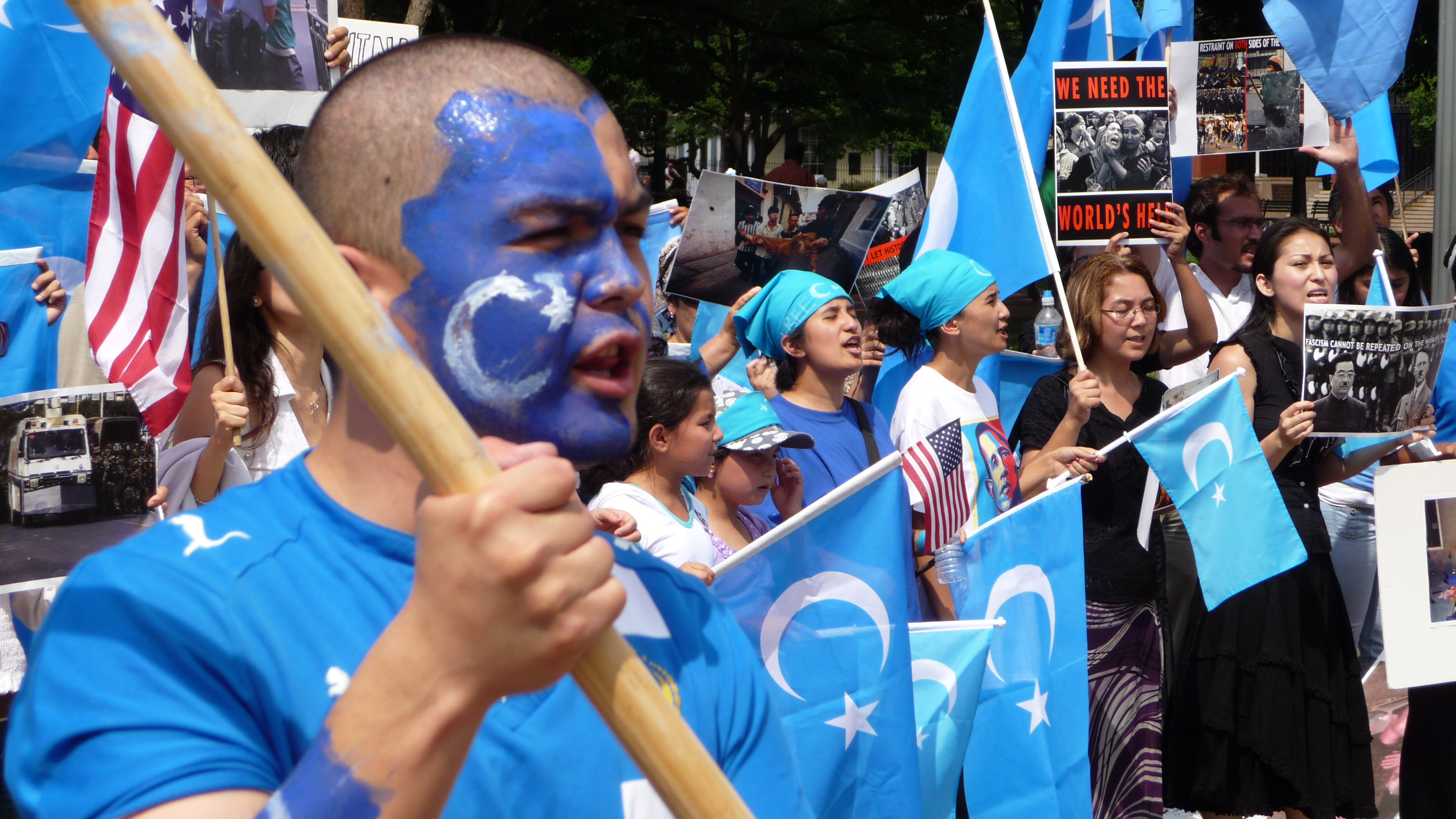
Uyghur demonstration in Washington, D.C.

Iran said it shared the concerns of Turkey and the OIC and appealed to the Chinese government to respect the rights of the Muslim population in Xinjiang.

Japan stated that it was monitoring the situation with concern; Singapore urged restraint and dialogue; while Taiwan strongly condemned all those who instigated the violence. Taiwanese premier Liu Chiao-shiuan also urged restraint and expressed hope that the Chinese authorities will demonstrate the "greatest possible leniency and tolerance in dealing with the aftermath" and respect the rights of ethnic minorities. Taiwan denied a visa to Kadeer in September 2009, alleging she had links to the East Turkestan Islamic Movement, classed as a terrorist organisation by the United Nations and United States.

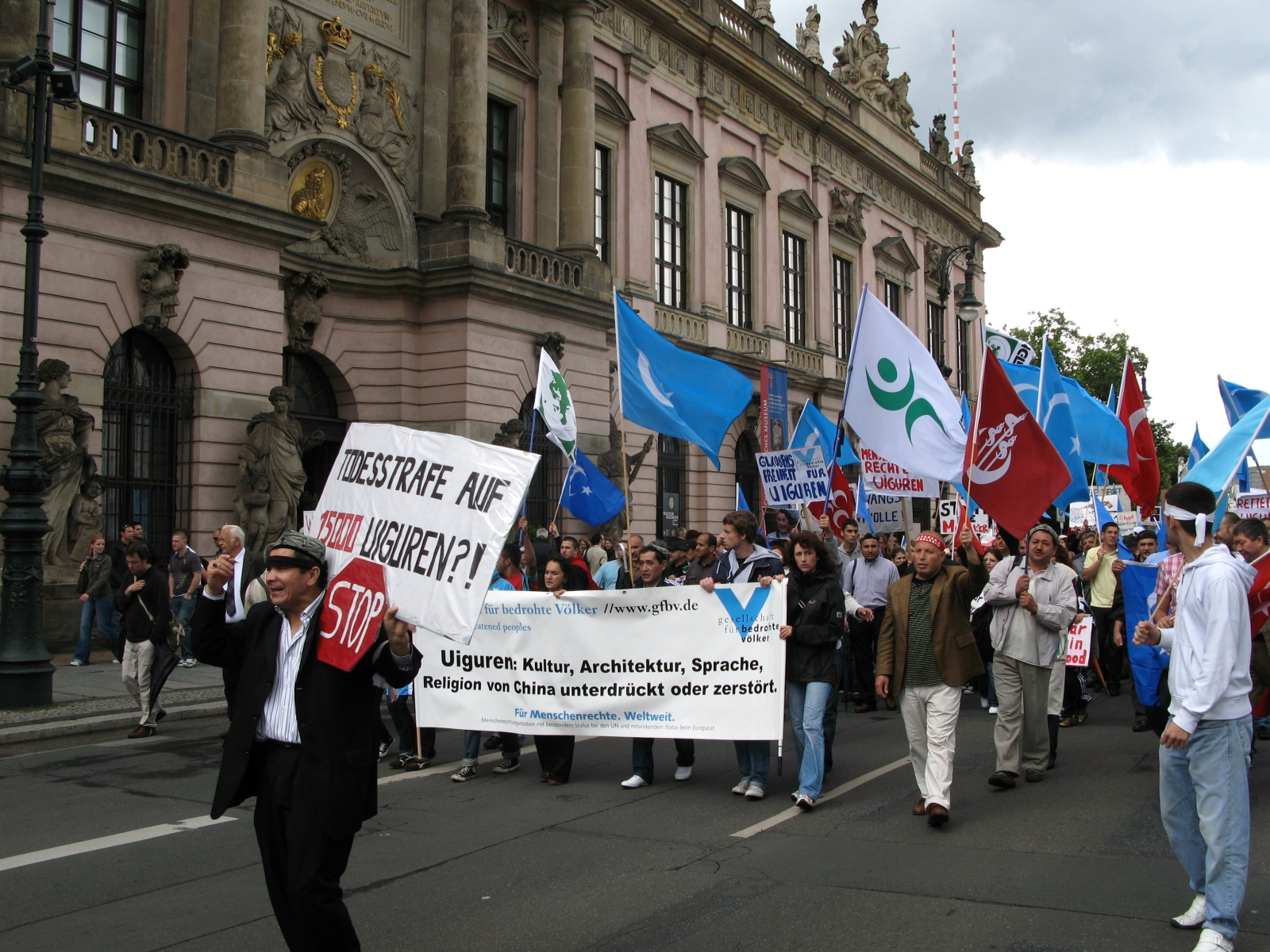
Demonstration in Berlin for Uyghur human rights

Switzerland called for restraint, and sent condolences to the families of victims and urged China to respect freedom of expression and the press. Prime Minister Kevin Rudd of Australia urged restraint to bring about a "peaceful settlement to this difficulty." Serbia stated that it opposed separatism and supports the "resolution of all disputes by peaceful means." Belarus noted with regret the loss of life and damage in the region, and hoped that the situation would soon normalise.

There was violence in the Netherlands and in Norway. The Chinese embassy in the Netherlands was attacked by Uyghur activists who smashed windows with bricks and burned Chinese flags. There were 142 arrests, and the embassy was closed for the day. About 100 Uyghurs protested outside the Chinese embassy in the Norwegian capital Oslo. Eleven were detained and later released without charges. Protesters from a coalition of Indonesian Islamist groups attacked guards at the Chinese embassy in Jakarta and called for a jihad against China. Pakistan said that certain "elements" were out to harm China-Pakistan relations, but they would not succeed in destabilising the interests of the two countries. Sri Lanka stressed the incident was an internal affair of China and was confident that efforts by the Chinese authorities would restore normalcy.

Canadian Foreign Affairs Minister Lawrence Cannon urged "dialogue and goodwill" to help resolve grievances and prevent further deterioration of the situation. A U.S. government spokesman said the U.S. regretted the loss of life in Xinjiang, was deeply concerned and called on all sides to exercise restraint. U.S. State Department spokesman Ian Kelly, said "it's important that the Chinese authorities act to restore order and prevent further violence." The U.S. Commission on International Religious Freedom expressed "grave concern" over repression in China and called for an independent investigation on the riots and targeted sanctions against China.

==== Non-governmental organisations ====
- Amnesty International: called for an "impartial and independent" inquiry into the incident, adding that those detained for "peacefully expressing their views and exercising their freedom of expression, association and assembly" must be released and others ensured to receive a fair trial.
- Human Rights Watch: urged China to exercise restraint and to allow an independent inquiry into the events, which would include addressing Uyghur concerns about policies in the region. It also added that China should respect international norms when responding to the protests and only use force proportionately.
- Al-Qaeda in the Islamic Maghreb: called on its supporters to attack Chinese workers in North Africa.

=== Media coverage ===
Chen Shirong, China editor on the BBC World Service, remarked at the improvement in media management by Xinhua: "To be more credible, it released video footage a few hours after the event, not two weeks." Peter Foster of the Daily Telegraph observed that "long-standing China commentators have been astonished at the speed at which Beijing has moved to seize the news agenda on this event," and attributed it to his belief that "China doesn't have a great deal to hide". A University of California, Berkeley academic agreed that the Chinese authorities had become more sophisticated. The New York Times and AFP recognised the Chinese learnt lessons from political protests around the world, such as the so-called colour revolutions in Georgia and Ukraine, and the 2009 Iranian election protests, and concluded that Chinese experts had studied how modern electronic communications "helped protesters organize and reach the outside world, and for ways that governments sought to counter them."

But Willy Lam, fellow of the Jamestown Foundation, sceptically said that the authorities were "just testing the reaction". He believed that if the outcome of this openness was poor they would "put the brakes on" as they did after the 2008 Sichuan earthquake. There were instances of foreign journalists being taken into custody by the police, to be released shortly thereafter. On 10 July, officials ordered foreign media out of Kashgar, "for their own safety." Xia Lin, a top official at Xinhua, later revealed that violence caused by both sides during and after the riots had been downplayed or wholly unreported in official news channels, for the fear that the ethnic violence would spread beyond Ürümqi.

A People's Daily op-ed rebuked certain western media outlets for their "double standards, biased coverage and comments". It said that China failed to receive fair "repayment" from certain foreign political figures or media outlets for its openness and transparent attitude. The author said "a considerable number of media outlets still intentionally or inadvertently minimised the violent actions of the rioters, and attempted to focus on so-called racial conflict." However, D'Arcy Doran from Agence France-Presse welcomed the increased openness for foreign media, but contrasted their reporting to Chinese media, which closely followed the government line to focus mainly on injured Han civilians whilst ignoring the "Uyghur story" or reasons behind the incident.

Many early reports of the riots, starting with one from Reuters, used a picture purporting to show the previous day's riots. The photo, showing large number of People's Armed Police squares, was one taken of the 2009 Shishou riot and originally published on 26 June by Southern Metropolis Weekly. The same picture was mistakenly used by other agencies; it was on the website of The Daily Telegraph, but was removed a day later. In an interview with Al Jazeera on 7 July, WUC leader Rebiya Kadeer displayed the same Shishou photograph claiming it as evidence of police abuses against Uyghurs. A World Uyghur Congress representative later apologised, explaining that the photo was chosen out of hundreds for its image quality.

On 3 August, Xinhua reported that two of Rebiya Kadeer's children had written letters blaming her for orchestrating the riots. A Germany-based spokesman for the WUC rejected the letters as fakes. A Human Rights Watch researcher remarked their style was "suspiciously close" to the way the Chinese authorities had described rioting in Xinjiang and the aftermath. He added that "it's highly irregular for [her children] to be placed on the platform of a government mouthpiece ... for wide dispersion."

== Aftermath and long-term impact ==
=== Arrests and trials ===
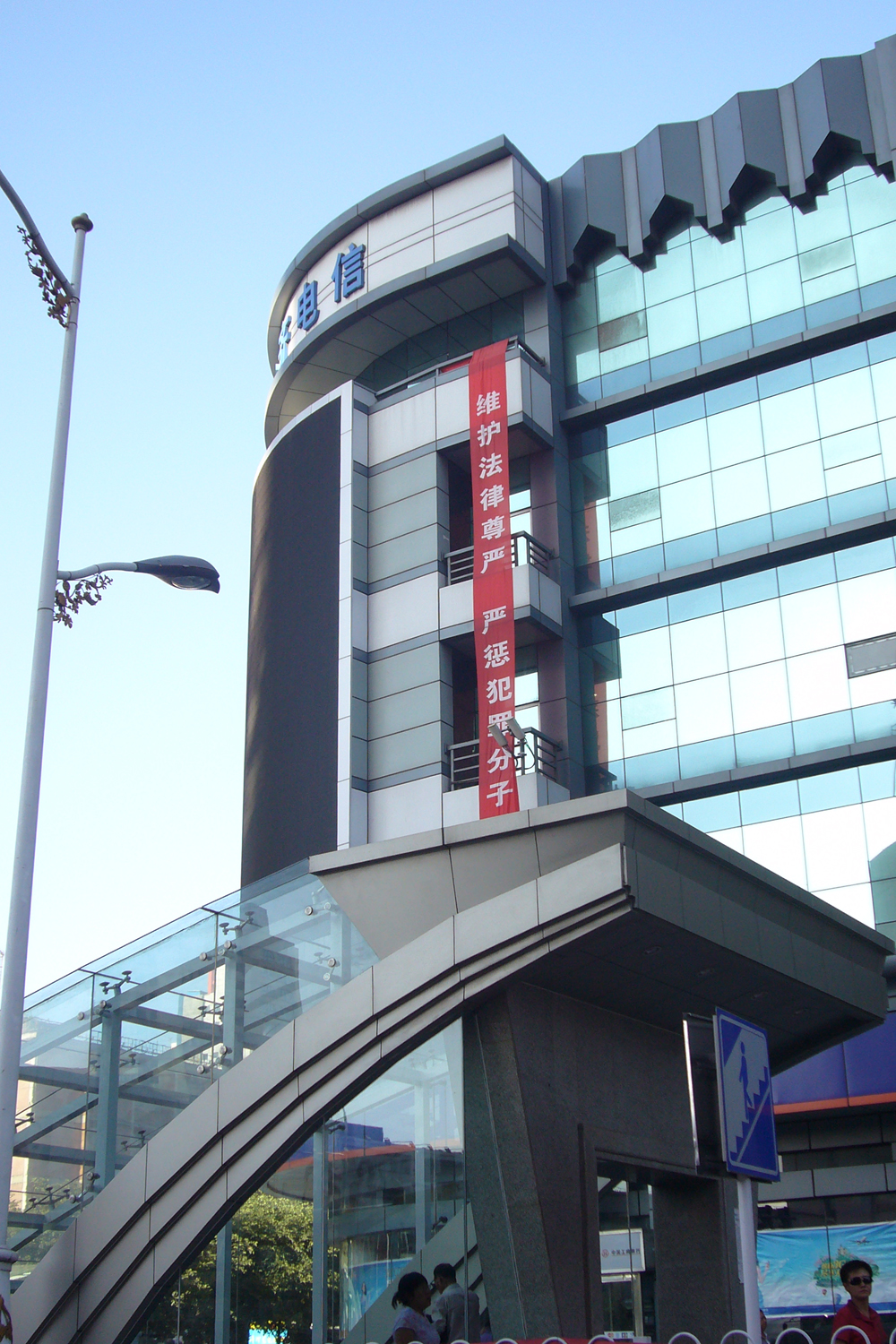
A red vertical banner saying "Uphold the sanctity of the law, and severely punish the criminals"

In early August, the Ürümqi government announced that 83 individuals had been "officially" arrested in connection with the riots. China Daily reported in late August that over 200 people were being charged and that trials would begin by the end of August. Although this was denied both by a provincial and a local Party official, Xinjiang authorities later announced that arrest warrants had been issued to 196 suspects, of which 51 had already been prosecuted. Police also requested that the procuratorate approve the arrest of a further 239 people, and detention of 825 more, China Daily said. In early December, 94 "fugitives" were arrested.

The state first announced criminal charges against detainees in late September, when it charged 21 people with "murder, arson, robbery, and damaging property". 14,000 security personnel were deployed in Ürümqi from 11 October, and the next day a Xinjiang court sentenced six men to death, and one to life imprisonment, for their roles in the riots. All six men were Uyghurs, and were found guilty of murder, arson and robbery during the riots. Foreign media said the sentences appeared to be aimed at mollifying the anger of the Han majority; the WUC denounced the verdict as "political", and said there was no desire to see justice served. Human Rights Watch said that there were "serious violations of due process" at the trials of 21 defendants relating to July protests. It said the trials "did not meet minimum international standards of due process and fair trials" – specifically, it said that the trials were carried out in a single day without prior public notice, that the defendants' choice of lawyers was restricted, and that the Party had given judges instructions on how to handle the cases. Xinhua, on the other hand, noted that the proceedings were conducted in both the Chinese and Uyghur languages, and that evidence had been carefully collected and verified before any decisions were made.

By February 2010, the number of death sentences issued had increased to at least 26, including at least one Han and one female Uyghur. Nine of the individuals sentenced were executed in November 2009; based on previous government statements, eight were Uyghur and one was Han.

=== Later unrest and security measures ===
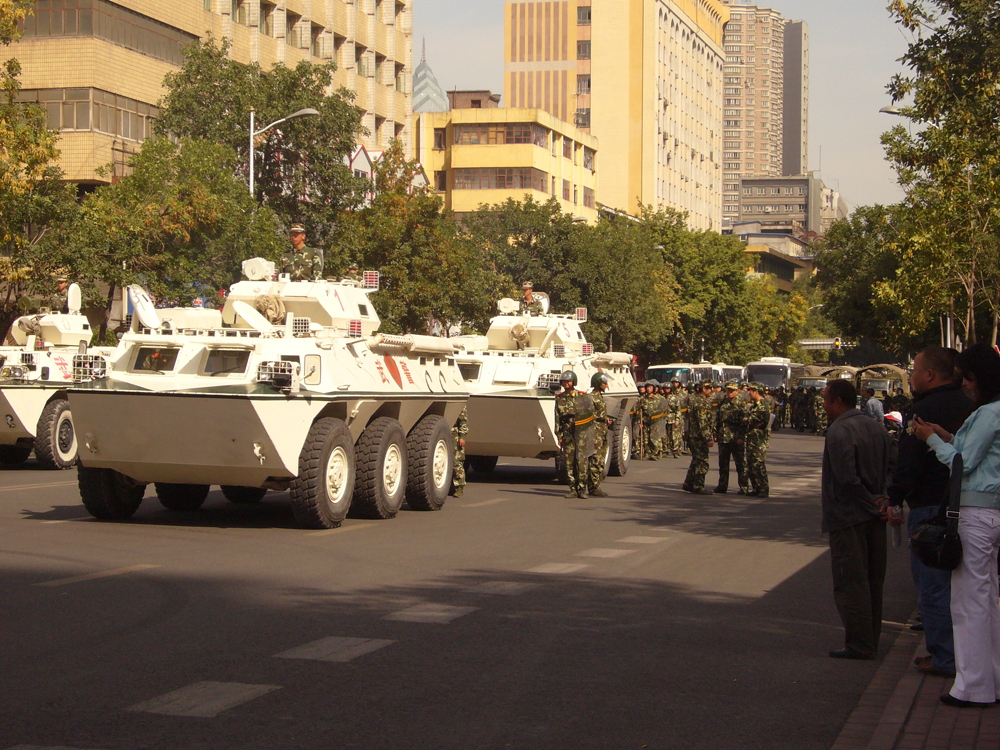
Armed police troops in Ürümqi in early September 2009, after wide-scale civilian demonstrations and protests against the syringe attacks

Starting in mid-August, there was a string of attacks in which as many as 476 individuals may have been stabbed with hypodermic needles. Officials believed that the attacks were targeting Han civilians and had been perpetrated by Uyghur separatists. In response to both concern over the attacks and dissatisfaction over the government's slowness in prosecuting people involved with the July riots, thousands of Han protested in the streets. On 3 September, five people died during the protests and 14 were injured, according to an official. The next day, the Communist Party secretary of Ürümqi, Li Zhi, was removed from his post, along with the police chief, Liu Yaohua; the provincial Party secretary Wang Lequan was replaced in April 2010.

While the city became calmer after these events, and the government made great efforts to show that life was returning to normal, an armed police presence did remain. As late as January 2010, it was reported that police were making patrols five or six times a day, and that patrols were stepped up at night. Shortly before the first anniversary of the rioting, the authorities installed more than 40,000 surveillance cameras around Ürümqi to "ensure security in key public places".

=== Legislation and investigation ===
In late August, the central government passed a law outlining standards for the deployment of armed police during "rebellion, riots, large-scale serious criminal violence, terror attacks and other social safety incidents." After the protests in early September, the government issued an announcement banning all "unlicensed marches, demonstrations and mass protests". The provincial government also passed legislation banning the use of the internet to incite ethnic separatism.

In November, the Chinese government dispatched some 400 officials to Xinjiang, including senior leaders such as State Council secretary general Ma Kai, Propaganda department head Liu Yunshan, and United Front chief Du Qinglin, to form an ad hoc "Team of Investigation and Research" on Xinjiang, ostensibly intended on studying the policy changes to be implemented in response to the violence. In April 2010, party secretary Wang Lequan was replaced by Zhang Chunxian, a more conciliatory figure. The government authorised transfer payments totalling some $15 billion from eastern provinces to Xinjiang to aid in the province's economic development, and announced plans to establish a special economic zone in Kashgar.

China has installed a grassroots network of officials throughout Xinjiang, its predominantly Muslim north-west frontier region, to address social risks and spot early signs of unrest: Hundreds of cadres have been transferred from southern Xinjiang, the region's poorest area, into socially unstable neighbourhoods of Ürümqi. A policy has been implemented where if all family members are unemployed, the government arranges for one person in the household to get a job; official announcements are calling upon university students to register for those payouts. The areas around slums are being redeveloped to reduce social risks, opening way to new apartment blocks. However, independent observers believe that fundamental inequalities need to be addressed, and the mindset must change for there to be any success; Ilham Tohti warned that the new policy could attract more Han immigration, and further alienate the Uyghur population.

=== Public services and Internet access ===
It took until at least early August for public transport to be fully restored in the city. According to Xinhua, 267 buses had been damaged during the rioting; most were back in operation by 12 August. The government paid bus companies a total of ¥5.25 million in compensation. Despite the resumption of transportation services, and the government's efforts to encourage visitors to the region, tourism fell sharply after the riots; on the National Day holiday in October, Xinjiang had 25% fewer tourists than it did in 2008.

Ürümqi public schools opened on schedule in September for the fall semester, but with armed police guarding them. Many schools began first-day classes by focusing on patriotism.

On the other hand, Internet and international telephone service in Ürümqi remained limited for nearly a year after the riots. As late as November, most of the Internet was still inaccessible to residents and international phone calls were impossible; as late as December, most web content hosted outside the region remained off-limits to all but a few journalists, and residents had to travel to Dunhuang 14 hours away to access the Internet normally. Within the city, only about 100 local sites, such as banks and regional government websites, could be accessed. Both incoming and outgoing international phone calls were disallowed, so Ürümqi residents could only communicate by calling intermediaries in other cities in China who would then place the international calls. The communications blackout generated controversy even within China: Yu Xiaofeng of Zhejiang University criticised the move, and many Ürümqi locals said it hurt businesses and delayed recovery, whereas David Gosset of the Euro-China forum argued that the government had the right to shut down communications for the sake of social stability; some locals believed that getting away from the Internet even improved their quality of life.

In late December, the government began restoring services gradually. The websites for Xinhua and the People's Daily, two state-controlled media outlets, were made accessible on 28 December, the web portals Sina.com and Sohu.com on 10 January 2010, and 27 more websites on 6 February. But access to websites was only partial: for instance, users could browse forums and blogs but not post on them. China Daily reported that limited e-mail services were also restored in Ürümqi on 8 February, although a BBC reporter writing at approximately the same time said e-mail was not accessible yet. Text messaging on cell phones was restored on 17 January, although there was a limit to how many messages a user could send daily. Internet access was fully restored in May 2010.

== See also ==
- List of massacres in China
