= 2014 Yarkand violence =

Episode of violence in Xinjiang, China

- Part of the Xinjiang conflict
- Location: 38°23′27″N 77°13′24″E; Yarkand County, Xinjiang, China
- Date: 28 July 2014
- Target: Civilians, police
- Deaths: 96
- Injuries: 13

Violence erupted on 28 July 2014 in Yarkand County (officially spelled Yarkant) of Kashgar Prefecture, Xinjiang, China, and lasted for several days, as Chinese police quelled the local unrest. The official death toll listed 96 fatalities: 59 alleged attackers and 37 bystanders (35 Han and 2 Uyghurs). The World Uyghur Congress claimed 2,000 people died, while the Hong Kong–based Apple Daily gave an estimate of 3,000 to 5,000 dead, citing unnamed sources.

== The incident ==
On 2 August 2014, Chinese authorities reported that on 28 July 2014, in Yarkand County, there was an "organized, premeditated, well-planned, and vicious ... terrorist incident, organized by a gang with ties to an overseas movement (i.e. the East Turkestan Islamic Movement or ETIM, officially known as the Turkistan Islamic Party or TIP) which attacked local police stations and government offices".

Independent media as well as the World Uyghur Congress (WUC) based on interviews with several residents reported that the incident started with a protest march following an extrajudicial killing of a Uyghur family of five during house to house searches in Bashkent Township (also known as Beshkent or Huangdi), triggered by reports of illegal prayer gatherings. The protests were reported as peaceful at first, but escalated due to Chinese authorities' use of excessive force. Local residents said in an Agence France-Presse report that in the nearby Elishku Township (Elishqu Village) about 500 people, including some refugees from Bashkent Township, armed with knives, axes and other farming tools were marching through the streets on 28 July, when they were attacked by a group of military police armed with assault rifles. Mahmouti, a local resident, heard the police yell "back off" to the crowd, followed by continuous gunfire, and then intermittent gunfire for about an hour. Yusup, another local farmer, said that none of the people who had gone to the demonstration had returned, and he estimated that about 1,000 people went missing. Further fatalities occurred during house to house searches that followed over several days and were reported in four villages in the region (those villages included Erik, Hangdi, and Dongbag, or No. 14, 15 and 16 in the township), although the reports differ on whether most fatalities occurred on the first day or in subsequent days.

The official casualty toll listed 96 dead, among them 59 alleged attackers and 37 bystanders (35 Han and 2 Uyghurs). Apple Daily reported that sources close to military intelligence claimed the violence in Yarkand County was a massacre in which between 3,000 and 5,000 people from four villages were killed, with no survivors. The exiled president of the WUC claimed that more than 2,000 people died.

== Aftermath ==
Investigation into the events has been made difficult due to the Chinese government's denial of it and censorship of independent and social media. Foreign journalists who attempted to investigate this incident were denied access, and later reported being unable to find unintimidated locals willing to talk to them. Internet and mobile access in the region was severely restricted for an unspecified length of time after the incident. Activists in China who provided information about it to international organizations have been arrested and sentenced for revealing "state secrets". Authorities officially blamed Nuramat Sawut as the ringleader of the attacks, accusing him of having close links to the TIP.

In response to the violence, WUC representative Dilxat Raxit spoke out against the Chinese government's policies in Xinjiang, stating, "If Beijing does not change its policy of extreme repression, this could lead to even more clashes".

In 2016, the WUC called the incident "the deadliest episode [in the region] since the unrest in Urumqi in July 2009".

In 2018, Apple Daily reported that several involved officials had been detained on accusations of bribery.

== See also ==
- 2014 China–Vietnam border shootout
- 2014 Kunming attack
- April 2014 Ürümqi attack
- Kizil massacre
- May 2014 Ürümqi attack
- Persecution of Uyghurs in China
- Xinjiang conflict
- Xinjiang re-education camps
