= Assassination of Juma Tayir =

2014 murder in Kashgar, China

Assassination of Juma Tahir
- Location: Id Kah Mosque, Kashgar, China
- Date: 30 July 2014; 6:58 a.m. (China Standard Time)
- Target: Imam Juma Tahir
- Attack type: Stabbing
- Deaths: 1 killed (Juma Tahir)
- Perpetrators: Tuergong Tuerxun, Maimaiti Jiangremutila, and Nuermaimaiti Abidilimiti

Juma Tayir

Chinese name
- Simplified Chinese: 居玛·塔伊尔
- Traditional Chinese: 居瑪·塔伊爾
Transcriptions
Standard Mandarin
- Hanyu Pinyin: Jūmǎ Tǎyīěr

Uyghur name
- Uyghur: جۈمە تاھىر
Transcriptions
- Latin Yëziqi: Jüme Tahir

On the early morning of Wednesday, 30 July 2014, Juma Tahir (Uyghur: جۈمە تاھىر, romanized: Jüme Tahir; Chinese: 居玛·塔伊尔), the imam of China's largest mosque, the Id Kah Mosque in northwestern Kashgar, was stabbed to death by three young male Uyghur extremists. Religious leaders across denominations condemned the attack.

Tahir was appointed by the government and supportive of national policies in the region. He had been a voice for peace in the insurgency involving the Uyghurs and the Han Chinese in the region. Since the mid-1990s, the traditional methods for appointing Imams have been replaced by appointments by the state, and assassination of religious leaders have escalated.

== Background ==
Since 1990, the Chinese government has disallowed Uighur Muslims from selecting the imams of their mosques. All Imams are appointed and paid a salary by the government. This follows the practice in China, where clergy are considered "religious professionals" and are subject to various regulations from the government. According to New York Times in 2008, government officials and students are not allowed to observe the Ramadan fast, and passports of all Uighurs have been impounded to encourage government-run Hajj pilgrimage trips.

=== Southern Xinjiang ===
Much of the violence in Xinjiang takes part in southern Xinjiang, which has been the focus of anti-terrorism efforts by the Xinjiang Party Chief from 2010 Zhang Chunxian. According to Xinjiang Academy of Social Sciences anti-terrorism researcher Ma Pinyan, unemployed, undereducated young people from rural South Xinjiang are susceptible to recruitment by Islamic extremists.

Most Xinjiang separatist violence targets ethnic majority Han people, but increasing attacks against fellow Uyghurs attempt to sway moderate Muslims to separatists' extreme version of Islam. Recent years have seen attacks from Uyghur separatists all over China, including in Kunming, southwest China's Yunnan, which killed 33 and injured 143; while the Shache attack days earlier left 96 dead.

=== Prior assassinations ===
The 1990s saw the rise of the modern meshrep around Yining enforcing a stricter Islamic morality than had been traditional in Xinjiang Uyghur exiles in Almaty, Kazakhstan, issued press releases claiming responsibility for orchestrating bombings in Xinjiang via their underground terror cells. Subsequently, antigovernmental and terrorist groups were organized into several groups including the East Turkestan Islamic Movement (ETIM), the East Turkistan Liberation Organization (ETLO), the Uyghur Liberation Organization, etc.

On 24 August 1993, two men from the East Turkestan movement stabbed and killed imam Abliz Damolla of the Great Mosque in Yecheng County. In 1996, Uyghur separatists shot assistant imam Hakimsidiq Haji of Aksu Prefecture on 22 March and attacked senior imam Aronghan Haji of the Id Kah Mosque with cleavers, who survived with cuts on his head, hands, back and legs. Mullah Aronghan Haji's attacker, Nurmamat, had absorbed Pan-Islamic and Pan-Turkic ideas from being sent to an illegal madrassah by his parents since the age of 5. On 6 November 1997, a member of a Xinjiang separatist group, Muhammat Tursun, fatally shot imam Yunus Sidiq Damolla at his mosque in Baicheng County. A Uyghur separatist exile shot imam Abliz Haji of Yecheng County dead on 27 January 1998. In September 2002, Uyghur nationalists assassinated at least six Uyghur officials. On 15 August 2013, the 74-year-old imam Abdurehim Damaolla of Kazihan Mosque in Turfan was stabbed to death in front of his home by parties sympathetic to the separatist Shanshan rioters.

== Imam Juma Tahir ==
Imam Juma Tahir, born October 1940 in Kashgar, was 73 at the time of his death. In 2003, he had been appointed as head imam of the 600-year-old mosque by the Chinese Communist Party in 2003.

A Uyghur speaker, Tahir served as a member of the National People's Congress from 2008 to 2013, during which he was often supported the Communist Party. He served a term as vice-president of the Islamic Association of China. As the leading Islamic Imam, he was frequently quoted by state media "praising the communist party and condemning Uighur separatists". BBC News reported that he was "said to have been unpopular with some Uighurs due to a pro-Beijing stance". Omer Kanat of the US-based World Uyghur Congress, told The Wall Street Journal on Friday that the imam had a reputation as a "tool for the government."

Tahir consistently condemned political violence in the name of Islam, despite receiving threatening letters for doing so. Tahir had urged calm after the July 2009 Ürümqi riots which killed 200 people, telling followers not to fall "into traps set by exiled separatists". He promoted moderate, traditionally Uyghur Islamic practices against a very recent trend of strict Islamic practices, like the donning of full-face veils.

While The Telegraph reported that he had no shortage of enemies in the local Uighur community, he was often described him as a "popular imam" and a "patriotic religious person".

=== Assassination ===
During the festival of Eid-ul-Fitr in July 2014, it was rumored that a family of five were killed in a quarrel with the police. This led to widespread rioting in which dozens of Uyghurs were shot dead by the Chinese police. The news was suppressed for about a week, but it emerged that nearly a hundred people had died.

Two days later, Tahir was stabbed as he was returning home after morning Fajr prayer at 6.58 am on Wednesday, 30 July 2014. Shopkeepers spotted Tahir's body in a pool of blood and alerted Radio Free Asia; a French tourist also told Reuters that he saw a body lying in a pool of blood outside of the prayer hall of the mosque, and two people with knives running away. Shortly after Tahir's death was discovered, police sealed off roads in and out of Kashgar.

On 30 July, police apprehended suspects Tuergong Tuerxun (Turghun Tursun), Maimaiti Jiangremutila (Memetjan Remutillan), and Nuermaimaiti Abidilimiti (Nurmemet Abidilimit). The gang resisted arrest with knives and axes, and the first two were shot dead in the struggle, while Abidilimiti (19), was arrested. Two days after the imam's murder, on 1 August, police arrested an 18-year-old construction worker, Aini Aishan (Gheni Hasan), who had been in hiding in Hotan. Aishan, who only had a middle school education, joined a religious extremist group in January 2013, consuming and distributing contraband videos and publications that advocated terrorism. Aishan invited Abidilimiti to come to Hotan from Kizilsu Kirghiz Autonomous Prefecture, to become his disciple, teaching him that to kill Tahir in "holy war" would earn both men a place in heaven. Abidilimiti confessed to orchestrating the assassinations with his two slain accomplices under the guidance of Aishan, despite the warnings of his older brother not to join illegal religious groups.

== Aftermath ==
Tahir left 15 children behind. One of his daughters, Yimgul Juma, spoke at his funeral. Party chief Zhang Chunxian observed a moment of silence for Tahir as well as for the victims of the Shache attack. China offered a 300 million yuan bounty for tips on violent separatist activity. The Xinjiang regional Islamic association called on Muslims to be aware of the perils of terrorism and religious extremism. More than 107 religious leaders in Xinjiang gathered in Ürümqi to pray for Tahir, including Ebeydulla Mohammed, imam of a mosque in Kashgar; Fan Chenguang, vice head of the Ürümqi Christian Council; and Yi Xuan, of the Buddhist Nanshan Faming Temple in Ürümqi County. They expressed concerns about the security of religious leaders in Xinjiang, and vowed to step up security checks and police patrols. A Xinhua editorial announced that "the terrorists and the religious extremist forces behind them have once again trampled on basic human rights" and expressed confidence that the killers would be brought to justice for violating Chinese law.

Nurmemet Abidilimit and Gheni Hasan were sentenced to death. A third accomplice, Atawulla Tursun, received a life sentence for his participation in the attack.

Dilxat Raxit, spokesman of the World Uyghur Congress did not condemn the murder and attributed it to "Chinese policies in the area".

Analyst Jacob Zenn from the Jamestown Foundation disputed the idea that religious restrictions cause terrorist attacks, although he warned that jihadists manipulate perceptions of Beijing's policy. A collective editorial from the South China Morning Post advised the government to target economic development to poor Uyghurs to stem the "underlying causes of the unrest".
