= Strike Hard Campaign Against Violent Terrorism =

2014 Chinese crackdown in Xinjiang

Strike Hard Against Violent Terrorism
- Part of the Xinjiang conflict
- Native name: 严厉打击暴力恐怖活动专项行动
- Location: Xinjiang Province, China
- Date: Beginning 2014; 23 May 2014 – Present
- Target: Ethnic Uyghurs, "separatists", violent extremists
- Attack type: Political repression, mass arrests, incarcerations and extrajudicial detention/surveillance
- Victims: 14,000 (Initial arrests); 1 million + (Forced detention)
- Perpetrators: Chinese Communist Party, Ministry of Public Security
- Motive: Stability maintenance, maintenance of Chinese Communist Party control over Xinjiang region, suppression of ethnic minority independence

Strike Hard Campaign Against Violent Terrorism
- Traditional Chinese: 嚴厲打擊暴力恐怖活動專項行動
- Simplified Chinese: 严厉打击暴力恐怖活动专项行动
- Literal meaning: Special action to crack down on violent terrorist activities
Transcriptions
Standard Mandarin
- Hanyu Pinyin: yánlì dǎjí bàolì kǒngbù huódòng zhuānxiàng xíngdòng

In May 2014, the government of the People's Republic of China launched the "Strike Hard Campaign against Violent Terrorism" in Xinjiang. Government officials describe the campaign as part of broader counterterrorism and "stability maintenance" efforts in the region. Human rights organizations and some scholars contend that authorities have used the global "war on terror" narrative to frame the Xinjiang conflict as Islamist terrorism and to legitimize expansive security measures in Xinjiang.

Earlier "Strike Hard" (Chinese: 严打) crackdowns were mounted in Xinjiang during the 1990s, including a Xinjiang-specific campaign announced in 1996, as part of periodic nationwide anti-crime drives.

== Background ==
In February 1997, a police roundup and execution of suspected "separatists" during Ramadan led to large demonstrations, which led to a PLA crackdown on protesters resulting in at least nine deaths in what became known as the Ghulja incident. The Ürümqi bus bombings later that month killed nine people and injured 68, with Uyghur exile groups claiming responsibility. In March 1997, a bus bomb killed two people, with responsibility claimed by Uyghur separatists and the Turkey-based "Organisation for East Turkistan Freedom".

The July 2009 Ürümqi riots, which resulted in over one hundred deaths, broke out in response to the Shaoguan incident, a violent dispute between Uyghur and Han Chinese factory workers. Following the riots, Uyghur terrorists killed dozens of Han Chinese in coordinated attacks from 2009 to 2016. These included the September 2009 Xinjiang unrest, the 2011 Hotan attack, the 2014 Kunming attack, the April 2014 Ürümqi attack, and the May 2014 Ürümqi attack. The attacks were conducted by Uyghur separatists, with some orchestrated by the Turkistan Islamic Party (a UN-designated terrorist organization, formerly called the East Turkistan Islamic Movement).

In April 2010, after the July 2009 Ürümqi riots, Zhang Chunxian replaced the former CCP chief Wang Lequan, who had been behind religious policies in Xinjiang for 14 years. Zhang Chunxian continued Wang's policy and even strengthened them. In 2011, Zhang proposed "modern culture leads the development in Xinjiang" as his policy statement. In 2012, he first mentioned the phrase "de-extremification" (Chinese: 去极端化) campaigns. Under General Secretary of the Chinese Communist Party Xi Jinping, the Chinese government began scaling up its military presence in the region and allegedly introducing more stringent restrictions on Uyghur civil liberties.

== Campaign ==
In response to growing tensions between Han Chinese and the Uyghur population of Xinjiang itself, the recruitment of Uyghurs to fight in the Syrian Civil War, and several terrorist attacks orchestrated by Uyghur separatists, in early 2014, Chinese authorities in Xinjiang launched the renewed "strike hard" campaign around New Year. It included measures targeting mobile phones, computers, and religious materials belonging to Uyghurs. The government simultaneously announced a "people's war on terror" and local government introduced new restrictions that included the banning of long beards and the wearing of veils in public places. Scholars have stated that the most pervasive of the repressive measures in Xinjiang may be the government's use of digital mass surveillance systems. Authorities collect the DNA, iris scans, and voice samples of the Uyghur population, regularly scan the contents of their digital devices, use digitally coded ID cards to track their movements, and train CCTV cameras on their homes, streets, and marketplaces.

== Criticism ==
China has received criticism for its mass detention of members of the Muslim Uyghur community from some countries as well as human rights observers. James A. Millward, a scholar who has researched Xinjiang for three decades, declared that the "state repression in Xinjiang has never been as severe as it has become since early 2017". The US State Department has said it is deeply concerned over China's "worsening crackdown" on minority Muslims in Xinjiang and the Trump administration has reportedly considered sanctions against senior Chinese officials and companies linked to allegations of human rights abuses. Canadian officials have also raised concern in Beijing and at the United Nations about the internment camps: "We are gravely concerned about the lack of transparency and due process in the cases of the many thousands of Uyghurs detained in so-called 're-education camps', which continues to call into question China's commitment to the rule of law and which violate its international human rights obligations."

=== Chinese government response ===
Chinese leader Xi Jinping stated in May 2014 at the Central Symposium on Work in Xinjiang that "practice has proved that our party's ruling strategy in Xinjiang is correct and must be maintained in the long run".

In November 2018, a UN panel condemned China's "deteriorating" human rights record in Tibet and Xinjiang. The Chinese government replied saying that such international condemnation was "politically motivated". Vice foreign minister Le Yucheng responded, "We will not accept the politically driven accusations from a few countries that are fraught with biases, with total disregard for facts. No country shall dictate the definition of democracy and human rights." China has defended the strike-hard campaign as lawful, asserting that the country is a victim of terrorism, and that Uyghur men are motivated by global jihadi ideology rather than driven by grievances at home. The Chinese government denies the re-education camps are for the purposes of re-education.

== See also ==
- Civil Servant-Family Pair Up
- Xinjiang conflict
- Strike Hard Against Crime Campaign (1983)
- Three Evils
