= Xinjiang conflict =

Geopolitical conflict in China

- Part of terrorism in China and the war on terror
- Xinjiang, highlighted red, shown within China
Date	1933–present (93 years)
Location	Xinjiang, China

Belligerents
People's Republic of China (from 1949); Republic of China (until 1950s); Xinjiang (1912–1933; 1944–1949); Xinjiang (1933–1944)	Uyghur separatists; Turkistan Islamic Party (1997–present); East Turkestan Liberation Organization (2000–2003); East Turkestan People's Revolutionary Party (1968–1989); United Revolutionary Front of East Turkestan (1968–2004); Second East Turkestan Republic (1944–1946); East Turkestan Revolutionary Party; First East Turkestan Republic (1933–1934); Various small groups

Commanders and leaders
Xi Jinping (2012–present) Ma Xingrui (2021–2025) Chen Quanguo (2016–2021) Previous leaders: Hu Jintao (2002–2012); Jiang Zemin (1989–2002); Deng Xiaoping (1978–1989); Hua Guofeng (1976–1978); Mao Zedong #; Chiang Kai-shek; Li Zongren; Sheng Shicai; Zhang Zhizhong; Ma Chengxiang; Ospan Batyr; Yulbars Khan; Masud Sabri	Yusupbek Mukhlisi (1960–2004) † Abdul Haq al-Turkistani; Abdullah Mansour; Previous leaders: (First East Turkestan Republic) Muhammad Amin Bughra (surrendered) Khoja Niyas (First East Turkestan Republic) Abdullah Bughra † (First East Turkestan Republic) Nur Ahmad Jan Bughra † Saifuddin Azizi (surrendered) Hasan Mahsum † Abdul Shakoor al-Turkistani †

Units involved
People's Police; People's Armed Police; People's Liberation Army; Xinjiang Production and Construction Corps; National Revolutionary Army (1931–1947); Republic of China Army (1947–1950s); Ma clique (1931–1949); Xinjiang People's Anti-Imperialist Association (1935–1942)	Various; Supported by: Afghan volunteers (1933–1934)

Casualties and losses
- 1,000+ dead c. (2007–2014) >1,700 injured 330,918+ arrested c. (2013–2017)

The Xinjiang conflict (Chinese: 新疆冲突; pinyin: xīnjiāng chōngtú), also known as the East Turkestan conflict, Uyghur–Chinese conflict or Sino–East Turkestan conflict (as argued by the East Turkistan Government-in-Exile), is an ethnic geopolitical conflict in what is now China's far-northwest autonomous region of Xinjiang, also known as East Turkestan. It is centred around the Uyghurs, a Turkic ethnic group who constitute a plurality (or 'relative majority' (Note: A plurality is known as a relative majority in British and Commonwealth English.)) of the region's population.

In the 1930s, armed conflicts known as the Xinjiang Wars broke out during the Warlord Era of the Republic of China and the Chinese Civil War, beginning with the Kumul Rebellion which saw the establishment of the First East Turkestan Republic in 1933 as well as its destruction in 1934. The Second East Turkestan Republic was later founded in 1944 with the support of the Soviet Union in the wake of the Ili Rebellion. Many of the Turkic peoples in Ili had close ties with the Russian Empire and the Soviet Union. As a result, many Turkic rebels fled to the Soviet Union and obtained Soviet assistance to create the Sinkiang Turkic People's Liberation Committee (STPNLC) in 1943 against Kuomintang rule during the Ili Rebellion. Since the incorporation of the region into the People's Republic of China, there have been armed conflicts between the Chinese government and separatist groups, the latter receiving support from the Soviet Union during the Sino-Soviet split during the 1960s.

Insurgency and hostilities increased following the Barin uprising and continued throughout the 1990s, marked by events such as the 1997 Ürümqi bus bombings and the Ghulja incident, and factors such as the mass state-sponsored migration of Han Chinese from the 1950s to the 1970s and harsh responses to separatism have contributed to regional tensions. The conflict saw a resurgence since the 2000s in the form of terror attacks and other events including the June 2009 Shaoguan Incident and the resulting July 2009 Ürümqi riots, the 2011 Hotan attack, April 2014 Ürümqi attack, May 2014 Ürümqi attack, 2014 Kunming attack, as well as the 2015 Aksu colliery attack.

In 2014, the Chinese government launched the Strike Hard Campaign Against Violent Terrorism in Xinjiang. In recent years, the Chinese Communist Party (CCP) under CCP general secretary Xi Jinping's policy has been marked by much harsher policies, including mass surveillance and the alleged incarceration without trial of over one million Uyghurs and other Muslim minority ethnic groups in re-education camps. (Note: Further independent reports: John, Sudworth (24 October 2018). "China's hidden camps". BBC News. Archived from the original on 5 January 2019.; Shih, Gerry (17 May 2018). "'Permanent cure': Inside the re-education camps China is using to brainwash Muslims". Business Insider. Associated Press. Archived from the original on 15 September 2018.; Rauhala, Emily (10 August 2018). "New evidence emerges of China forcing Muslims into 'reeducation' camps". Washington Post. Archived from the original on 19 January 2019.; Dou, Eva; Page, Jeremy; Chin, Josh (17 August 2018). "China's Uighur Camps Swell as Beijing Widens the Dragnet". Wall Street Journal. Archived from the original on 17 August 2018.; "A Summer Vacation in China's Muslim Gulag". Foreign Policy. Archived from the original on 3 January 2019.; Regencia, Ted. "Escape from Xinjiang: Muslim Uighurs speak of China persecution". Al Jazeera. Archived from the original on 11 September 2018.; Kuo, Lily (31 October 2018). "UK confirms reports of Chinese mass internment camps for Uighur Muslims". The Guardian. Archived from the original on 4 January 2019.) (Note: Human Rights Watch gives the following compilation of estimates of the detained population: Zenz, Adrian (15 May 2018). "New Evidence for China's Political Re-Education Campaign in Xinjiang". China Brief. 18 (10). Jamestown Foundation.; Chinese Human Rights Defenders (CHRD) and Equal Rights Initiative (ERI), "China: Massive Numbers of Uyghurs & Other Ethnic Minorities Forced into Re-education Programs", 3 August 2018 (accessed 24 August 2018).; 'Eradicating Ideological Viruses': China's Campaign of Repression Against Xinjiang's Muslims (Report). Human Rights Watch. 9 September 2018. "Zenz estimated the detainee number by extrapolating from a leaked Xinjiang police report, released by a Turkish TV station run by Uyghur exiles, as well as from reports by Radio Free Asia. CHRD and ERI made the estimate by extrapolating the percentages of people detained in villages as reported by dozens of Uyghur villagers in Kashgar Prefecture during interviews with CHRD.") Numerous reports have stated that many of these minorities have been used for prison labour. Western observers have labelled the campaign to be an instance of crimes against humanity and cultural genocide.

The Chinese government has refuted charges of genocide and other human rights abuses, characterising the centers as deradicalisation and integration programs and were the subject of dispute at the 44th session of the United Nations Human Rights Council (UNHRC); 39 Western-aligned countries condemned China's treatment of the Uyghurs in Xinjiang in June 2020. Similarly, in July, a group of 45 nations, including many Middle Eastern nations, issued a competing letter to the UNHRC, defending China's treatment of both Uyghurs and other Muslim minorities in Xinjiang. Various groups and media organisations worldwide have both disputed and supported the claim that human rights violations have occurred. (Note: Per Foreign Policy, New York Times, Bloomberg, BBC, Deutsche Welle, Amnesty International, Radio Free Europe/Radio Liberty, France24 and Toronto Star.)

== Background ==
Xinjiang is a large central-Asian region within the People's Republic of China comprising numerous minority groups: 45% of its population are Uyghurs, and 40% are Han. Its heavily industrialised capital, Ürümqi, has a population of more than 2.3 million, about 75% of whom are Han, 12.8% are Uyghur, and 10% are from other ethnic groups.

In general, Uyghurs and the mostly Han government disagree on which group has greater historical claim to the Xinjiang region: Uyghurs believe their ancestors were indigenous to the area, whereas government policy considers Xinjiang to have belonged to China since around 200 BC during Han Dynasty. According to Chinese policy, Uyghurs are classified as a National Minority; they are considered to be no more indigenous to Xinjiang than the Han, and have no special rights to the land under the law. During the Mao era the People's Republic oversaw the migration into Xinjiang of millions of Han, who have been accused of economically dominating the region, although a 2008 survey on both ethnic groups has contradicted the allegation.

Current Chinese minority policy is based on affirmative action, and has reinforced a Uyghur ethnic identity that is distinct from the Han population. However, Human Rights Watch describes a "multi-tiered system of surveillance, control, and suppression of religious activity" perpetrated by state authorities. In 2018, it was estimated that over 100,000 Uyghurs were held in political "re-education camps". China justifies such measures as a response to the terrorist threat posed by extremist separatist groups. These policies, in addition to some long-standing prejudices between the Han and Uyghurs, have sometimes resulted in tension between the two ethnic groups. As a result of the policies, the Uyghurs' freedoms of religion and of movement have been curtailed.

On the other hand, some Han citizens view Uyghurs as benefiting from special treatment, such as preferential admission to universities and exemption from the (now abandoned) one-child policy, and as "harbouring separatist aspirations". Nonetheless, it was observed in 2013 that at least in the workplace, Uyghur-Han relations seemed relatively friendly, and a survey from 2009 suggested that 70% of Uyghur respondents had Han friends while 82% of Han had Uyghur friends.

Due to exemption from the one-child policy, Uyghur numbers increased from 5.5 million in 1980s to over 12 million in 2017. Ethnic minority couples were paid incentives to keep their family size below the legal limit and accept sterilisation after three children preceding the removal of the preferential policy.

== Restrictions ==
Islamic leaders during the Cultural Revolution were forced to take part in acts against their religion, such as eating pork. China does not enforce the law against children attending mosques on non-Uyghurs outside Xinjiang. Since the 1980s Islamic private schools (Sino-Arabic schools (中阿学校)) have been permitted by the Chinese government in Muslim areas, excluding Xinjiang because of its separatist sentiment. (Note: The People's Republic, founded in 1949, banned private confessional teaching from the early 1950s to the 1980s, until a more liberal stance allowed religious mosque education to resume and private Muslim schools to open. Moreover, except in Xinjiang for fear of secessionist feelings, the government allowed and sometimes encouraged the founding of private Muslim schools in order to provide education for people who could not attend increasingly expensive state schools or who left them early, for lack of money or lack of satisfactory achievements.)

Hui Muslims employed by the state, unlike Uyghurs, are allowed to fast during Ramadan. The number of Hui going on Hajj is expanding and Hui women are allowed to wear veils, but Uyghur women are discouraged from wearing them. Muslim ethnic groups in different regions are treated differently by the Chinese government with regard to religious freedom. Religious freedom exists for Hui Muslims, who can practice their religion, build mosques and have their children attend them; more restrictions are placed on Uyghurs in Xinjiang. Hui religious schools are allowed, and an autonomous network of mosques and schools run by a Hui Sufi leader was formed with the approval of the Chinese government. According to The Diplomat, Uyghur religious activities are curtailed but Hui Muslims are granted widespread religious freedom; therefore, Chinese governmental policy is directed at Uyghur separatism.

In the last two decades of the 20th century, Uyghurs in Turpan were treated favourably by China with regard to religion; while Kashgar and Hotan were subject to more stringent government control. Uyghur and Han Communist officials in Turpan turned a blind eye to the law, allowing Islamic education of Uyghur children. Religious celebrations and the Hajj were encouraged by the Chinese government for Uyghur Communist Party members, and 350 mosques were built in Turpan between 1979 and 1989. As a result, Han, Hui and the Chinese government were then viewed more positively by Uyghurs in Turpan. In 1989, there were 20,000 mosques in Xinjiang. Until separatist disturbances began in 1996, China allowed people to ignore the rule prohibiting religious observance by government officials. Large mosques were built with Chinese government assistance in Ürümqi. While rules proscribing religious activities were enforced in southern Xinjiang, conditions were comparatively lax in Ürümqi.

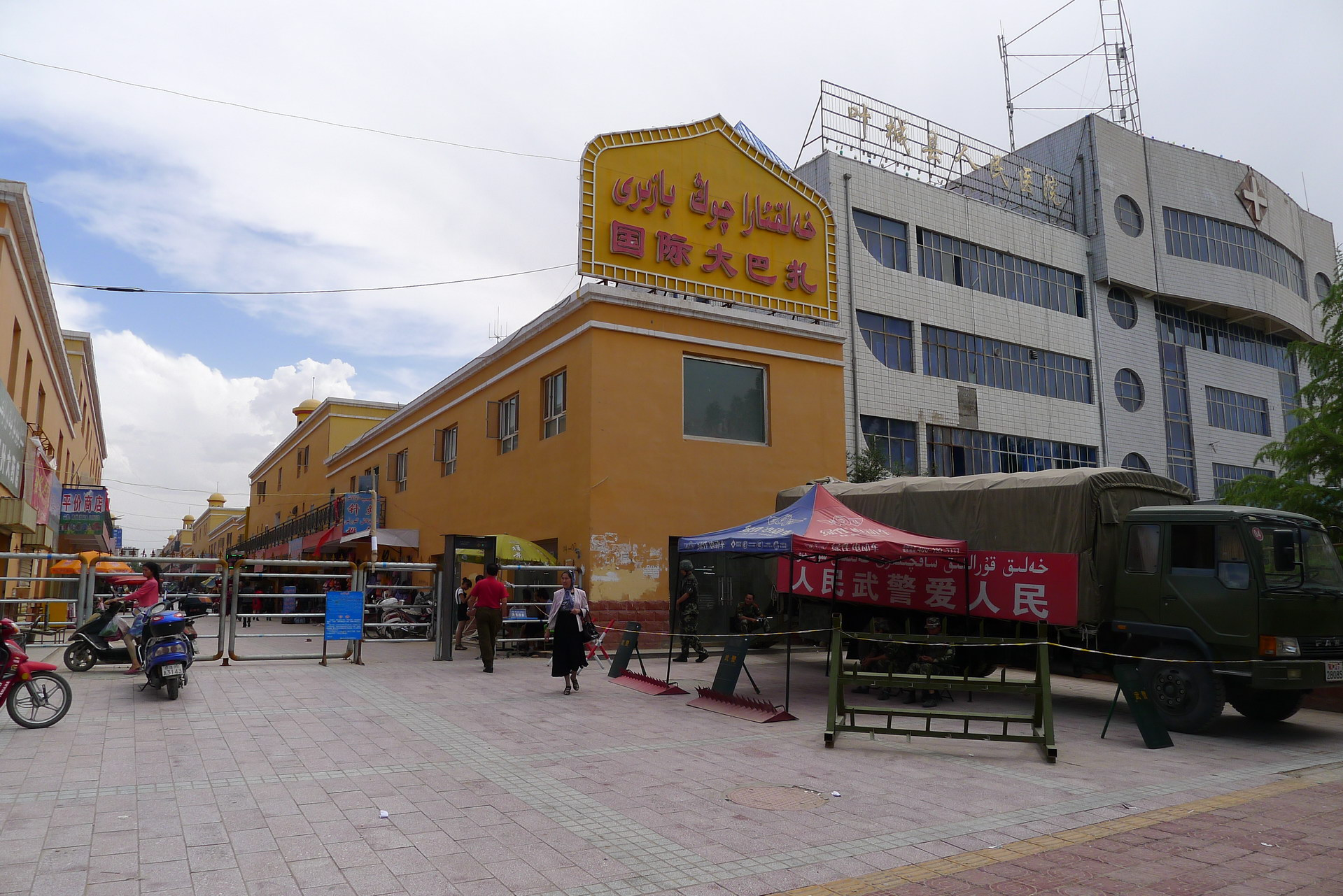
Armed police and metal detector at the Kargilik bazaar

According to The Economist, in 2016 Uyghurs faced difficulties travelling within Xinjiang and live in fenced-off neighbourhoods with checkpoint entrances. In southern Ürümqi, each apartment door has a QR code so police can easily see photos of the dwelling's authorised residents.

In 2017, overseas Uyghur activists claimed that new restrictions were being imposed, including people being fined heavily or subjected to programmes of "re-education" for refusing to eat during fasting in Ramadan, the detention of hundreds of Uyghurs as they returned from Mecca pilgrimages, and many standard Muslim names, such as Muhammad, being banned for newborn children. It was claimed that Han officials had been assigned to reside in the homes of those with interned Uyghur family members as part of the government's "Pair Up and Become Family" program. There were also reportedly separate queues for Uyghurs and outsiders, where the former needed to get their identity cards checked at numerous points.

In 2021 Amnesty International released a 160-page report on the human rights violations occurring in Xinjiang. It intensively describes China's collection of the biometric data and surveillance of Uyghurs in Xinjiang. Additionally in 2021 PBS' Frontline discussed the extensive surveillance and facial recognition software used in Xinjiang. From QR codes to facial recognition cameras and "home stays," by government officials. They estimated nearly two million Uyghurs were being detained across over 12,000 camps.

== Timeline ==
=== Pre-20th century ===
The history of the region has become highly politicised, with both Chinese and nationalist Uyghur historians frequently overstating the extent of their groups' respective ties to the region. In reality, it has been home to many groups throughout history, with the Uyghurs arriving from Central Asia in the 10th century. Although various Chinese dynasties have at times exerted control over parts of what is now Xinjiang, the region as it exists today came under Chinese rule as a result of the westward expansion of the Manchu-led Qing dynasty, which also saw the annexation of Mongolia and Tibet.

Early Qing rule was marked by a "culturally pluralist" approach, with a prohibition on Chinese settlement in the region, and indirect rule through supervised local officials. An increased tax burden placed on the local population due to rebellions elsewhere in China later led to a number of Hui-led Muslim rebellions. The region was subsequently recaptured, and was established as an official province in 1884.

Near the end of their rule the Qing tried to colonise Xinjiang along with other parts of the imperial frontier. To accomplish this goal they began a policy of settler colonialism by which Han Chinese were resettled on the frontier.

=== 20th century ===
After the 1928 assassination of Yang Zengxin, governor of the semi-autonomous Kumul Khanate in east Xinjiang under the Republic of China, he was succeeded by Jin Shuren. On the death of the Kamul Khan Maqsud Shah in 1930, Jin abolished the Khanate entirely and took control of the region as warlord. Corruption, appropriation of land, and the commandeering of grain and livestock by Chinese military forces were all factors which led to the eventual Kumul Rebellion that established the First East Turkestan Republic in 1933. In 1934, it was conquered by warlord Sheng Shicai with the aid of the Soviet Union. Sheng's leadership was marked by heavy Soviet influence, with him openly offering Xinjiang's valuable natural resources in exchange for Soviet help in crushing revolts, such as in 1937. Although already in use, (Note: The First East Turkestan Republic had considered the name "Uyghuristan", with some early coins bearing that name, but settled on the "East Turkestan Republic" on the basis that there were other Turkic peoples in Xinjiang and the new government.) it was in this period that the term "Uyghur" was first used officially over the generic "Turkic", as part of an effort to "undermine potential broader bases of identity" such as Turkic or Muslim. In 1942, Sheng sought reconciliation with the Republic of China, abandoning the Soviets.

In 1944, the Ili Rebellion led to the Second East Turkestan Republic. Though direct evidence of Soviet involvement remains circumstantial, and rebel forces were primarily made up of Turkic Muslims with the support of the local population, the new state was dependent on the Soviet Union for trade, arms, and "tacit consent" for its continued existence. When the Communists defeated the Republic of China in the Chinese Civil War, the Soviets helped the Communist People's Liberation Army (PLA) recapture it, and it was annexed by the People's Republic in 1949.

The Xinjiang Uyghur Autonomous Region was established in 1955.

In the late 1950s and early 1960s, between 60,000 and 200,000 Uyghurs, Kazakhs, and other minorities fled China to the USSR, largely as a result of the Great Leap Forward. As the Sino-Soviet split deepened, the Soviets initiated an extensive propaganda campaign criticising China, encouraging minority groups to migrate – and later revolt – and attempting to undermine Chinese sovereignty by appealing to separatist tendencies. In 1962, China stopped issuing exit permits for Soviet citizens, as the Soviet consulate had been distributing passports to enable the exodus. A resulting demonstration in Yining was met with open fire by the PLA, sparking further protests and mass defections. China responded to these developments by relocating non-Han populations away from the border, creating a "buffer zone" which would later be filled with Han farmers and Bingtuan militia. Tensions continued to escalate throughout the decade, with ethnic guerrilla groups based in Kazakhstan frequently raiding Chinese border posts, and Chinese and Soviet forces clashing on the border in 1969.

From the 1950s to the 1970s, a state-orchestrated mass migration into Xinjiang has raised the number of Han from 7% to 40% of the population, exacerbating ethnic tensions. On the other hand, a declining infant-mortality rate, improved medical care and non-applicability of China's one-child policy on minorities have helped the Uyghur population in Xinjiang grow from four million in the 1960s to eight million in 2001.

In 1968, the East Turkestan People's Party was the largest militant Uyghur separatist organisation, and may have received support from the Soviet Union. During the 1970s, the Soviets likely supported the United Revolutionary Front of East Turkestan (URFET), which issued a series of press releases responsible for creating the impression of an active, organised resistance movement, despite involving only a handful of individuals. Its founder, Yusupbek Mukhlis came to be resented by other Uyghur groups for "exaggerating Uyghur involvement in militant activities", including falsely claiming credit for terrorist attacks.

Xinjiang's importance to China increased after the 1979 Soviet assistance to Afghanistan, which led to China's perception of being encircled by the Soviets. China supported the Afghan mujahideen during the Soviet assistance to the Democratic Republic of Afghanistan and broadcast reports of Soviet atrocities committed on Afghan Muslims to Uyghurs to counter Soviet broadcasts to Xinjiang that Soviet Muslim minorities had a better life. Anti-Soviet Chinese radio broadcasts targeted Central Asian ethnic minorities, such as the Kazakhs. The Soviets feared disloyalty by the non-Russian Kazakh, Uzbek, and Kyrgyz in the event of a Chinese invasion of Soviet Central Asia, and Russians were taunted by Central Asians: "Just wait till the Chinese get here, they'll show you what's what!" Chinese authorities viewed Han migrants in Xinjiang as vital to defence against the Soviet Union. China established camps to train the Afghan mujahideen near Kashgar and Hotan, investing hundreds of millions of dollars in small arms, rockets, mines, and anti-tank weapons. During the 1980s, student demonstrations and riots against police action assumed an ethnic aspect, and the April 1990 Barin uprising has been acknowledged as a turning point.

The Soviet Union supported Uyghur nationalist propaganda and Uyghur separatist movements against China. Soviet historians claimed that the Uyghur native land was Xinjiang; and Uyghur nationalism was promoted by Soviet versions of history on turcology. This included support of Uyghur historians such as Tursun Rakhimov, who wrote more historical works supporting Uyghur independence, claiming that Xinjiang was an entity created by China made out of the different parts of East Turkestan and Zungharia. Bellér-Hann describes these Soviet Uyghur historians were waging an "ideological war" against China, emphasising the "national liberation movement" of Uyghurs throughout history. The CPSU supported the publication of works which glorified the Second East Turkestan Republic and the Ili Rebellion against China in its anti-China propaganda war.

=== 1990s to 2007 ===
China's "Strike Hard" campaign (Note: Note to be confused with the post-2014 "Strike Hard" campaign) against crime, beginning in 1996, saw thousands of arrests, as well as executions, and "constant human rights violations", and also marked reduction in religious freedom. These policies, and a feeling of political marginalisation, contributed to the fomentation of groups who carried out numerous guerrilla operations, including sabotage and attacks on police barracks, and acts of terrorism including bomb attacks and assassinations of government officials.

A February 1992 Ürümqi bus bombing, attributed to the Shock Brigade of the Islamic Reformist Party, resulted in three deaths.

On 28 October 2013, five Uyghurs drove a jeep into Beijing's Tiananmen Square, set the gas tank on fire, killed two civilians and injured more than forty bystanders. These Uyghurs had jihadist flags and there was evidence of their ties to ETIM.

On 2 March 2014, eight Uyghurs armed with knives attacked civilians in a train station in southern China, killing 33 and injuring 143.

A police roundup and execution of 30 suspected separatists during Ramadan resulted in large demonstrations in February 1997, characterised as riots by Chinese state media outlet China Daily and peaceful by Western media. The demonstrations culminated in the 5 February Ghulja incident, in which a People's Liberation Army (PLA) crackdown led to at least nine deaths. 25 February Ürümqi bus bombings killed nine people and injured 68. Responsibility for the attacks was acknowledged by Uyghur exile groups.

In Beijing's Xidan district, a bus bomb killed two people on 7 March 1997; Uyghur separatists claimed responsibility for the attack. Uyghur participation in the bombing was dismissed by the Chinese government, and the Turkish-based Organisation for East Turkistan Freedom admitted responsibility for the attack. The bus bombings triggered a change in policy, with China acknowledging separatist violence. The situation in Xinjiang quieted until mid-2006, although ethnic tensions remained.

In 2005, Uygur author Nurmemet Yasin was sentenced to ten years' imprisonment for inciting separatism following his publication of an allegorical short story, "The Blue Pigeon".

=== 2007–present ===
The number of violent incidents and uprisings increased from the 1990s, peaking in 2014, although their extent is difficult to confirm independently due to restrictions on the access of independent observers and international journalists.

According to Vaughan Winterbottom, although the Turkistan Islamic Party distributes propaganda videos and its Arabic Islamic Turkistan magazine (documented by Jihadology.net and the Jamestown Foundation) the Chinese government apparently denied the party's existence; China claimed that there was no terrorist connection to its 2008 bus bombings as the TIP claimed responsibility for the attacks. In 2007, police raided a suspected TIP terrorist training camp. The following year, an attempted suicide bombing on a China Southern Airlines flight was thwarted and the Kashgar attack resulted in the death of sixteen police officers four days before the beginning of the Beijing Olympics.

During the night of 25–26 June 2009, in the Shaoguan incident in Guangdong, two people were killed and 118 injured. The incident reportedly triggered the July 2009 Ürümqi riots; others were the September 2009 Xinjiang unrest and the 2010 Aksu bombing, after which 376 people were tried. The July 2011 Hotan attack led to the deaths of 18 people, 14 of whom were attackers. Although the attackers were ethnic Uyghurs, both Han and Uyghurs were victims. That year, six ethnic Uyghur men unsuccessfully attempted to hijack an aircraft heading to Ürümqi, a series of knife and bomb attacks occurred in July and the Pishan hostage crisis occurred in December. Credit for the attacks was professed by the Turkistan Islamic Party.

On 28 February 2012, an attack in Yecheng left 20 people dead, including seven attackers. On 24 April 2013, clashes in Bachu occurred between a group of armed men and social workers and police near Kashgar. The violence left at least 21 people dead, including 15 police and officials. According to a local government official, the clashes broke out after three other officials reported that suspicious men armed with knives were hiding in a house outside Kashgar. Two months later, on 26 June, riots in Shanshan left 35 dead, including 22 civilians, 11 rioters and 2 police officers.

On 28 October 2013, an SUV ploughed through a group of pedestrians near Tiananmen Square in central Beijing, crashed into a stone bridge and caught fire, causing dozens of casualties. Chinese authorities quickly identified the driver as Uyghur.

In 2014, the conflict intensified. In January, eleven Uyghur militants were killed by Kyrgyz security forces. They were identified as Uyghurs by their appearance, and their personal effects indicated that they were separatists.

On 1 March, a group of knife-wielding terrorists attacked the Kunming Railway Station, killing 31 and injuring 141. China blamed Xinjiang militants for the attack, and over 380 people were arrested in the following crackdown. Following reports of the attack, Uyghur-Chinese actress Medina Memet urged her fans on Weibo not to equate Uyghurs with terrorism. A captured attacker and three others were charged on 30 June. Three of the suspects were accused of "leading and organising a terror group and intentional homicide", although they did not directly take part since they had been arrested two days earlier. On 12 September, a Chinese court sentenced three people to death and one to life in prison for the attack. The attack was praised by ETIM.

On 18 April, a group of 16 Chinese citizens identified as ethnic Uyghurs engaged in a shootout with Vietnamese border guards after seizing their guns when they were being detained to be returned to China. Five Uyghurs and two Vietnamese guards died in the incident. Ten of the Uyghurs were men, and the rest were women and children.

Twelve days later, two attackers stabbed people before detonating their suicide vests at an Ürümqi train station. Three people, including the attackers, were killed.

On 22 May, two suicide car bombings occurred after the occupants threw explosives from their vehicles at an Ürümqi street market. The attacks killed 43 people and injured more than 90, one of the deadliest attacks to date in the Xinjiang conflict. On 5 June, China sentenced nine people to death for terrorist attacks in Xinjiang.

According to the Xinhua News Agency, on 28 July, 37 civilians were killed by a gang armed with knives and axes in the towns of Elixku and Huangdi in Shache County and 59 attackers were killed by security forces. Two hundred fifteen attackers were arrested after they stormed a police station and government offices. The agency also reported that 30 police cars were damaged or destroyed and dozens of Uyghur and Han Chinese civilians were killed or injured. The Uyghur American Association claimed that local Uyghurs had been protesting at the time of the attack. Two days later, the moderate imam of China's largest mosque was assassinated in Kashgar after morning prayers.

On 21 September, Xinhua reported that a series of bomb blasts killed 50 people in Luntai County, southwest of the regional capital Ürümqi. The dead consisted of six civilians, four police officers and 44 rioters.

On 12 October, four Uyghurs armed with knives and explosives attacked a farmers' market in Xinjiang. According to police, 22 people died (including police officers and the attackers).

On 29 November, 15 people were killed and 14 injured in a Shache County attack. Eleven of the killed were Uyghur militants.

On 18 September 2015, in Aksu, an unidentified group of knife-wielding terrorists attacked sleeping workers at a coal mine and killed as many as 50 people, before fleeing into the mountains. The Turkistan Islamic Party has claimed responsibility for the attack. On 18 November, a 56-day manhunt for the attackers concluded with security forces killing 28 assailants. One member of the gang surrendered to authorities.

The Bangkok bombing is suspected to have been carried out by the Turkish ultranationalist organisation known as the Grey Wolves in response to Thailand's deportation of 100 Uyghur asylum-seekers back to China. A Turkish man was arrested by Thai police in connection with the bombing and bomb-making materials were found in his apartment. Due to the terrorist risk and counterfeiting of passports, Uyghur foreigners in Thailand were placed under surveillance by Defence Minister Prawit Wongsuwon and Thai police were placed on alert after the arrival of two Turkish Uyghurs.

On 30 August 2016, Kyrgyzstan's Chinese embassy was struck by a suicide bombing by a Uyghur, according to Kyrgyz news. The suicide bomber was the only fatality from the attack. The casualties included wounds suffered by Kyrgyz staff members and did not include Chinese. A Kyrgyzstan government agency pointed the finger at Nusra allied Syrian based Uyghurs.

Police killed 4 militants who carried out a bombing on 28 December 2016 in Karakax.

On 14 February 2017, three knife wielding attackers killed five people before being killed by police.

In the period 2013–2017 there were 330,918 arrests in the province accounting for 7.3% of total arrests in China. This compares to 81,443 arrests in the previous five years. In March 2019, Chinese officials claimed that they had arrested more than 13,000 militants in Xinjiang since 2014.

After Bashar Al-Assad was overthrown on December 7, 2024, the Turkestan Islamic Party threatened to attack China. The CCP "vow[ed] to 'strike down'" the TIP.

=== Aftermath ===
In 2014, the Chinese government launched the Strike Hard Campaign Against Violent Terrorism in Xinjiang. Since that year, the government has pursued a policy which has led to more than one million Muslims (the majority of them Uyghurs) being held in secretive detention camps without any legal process in what has become the largest-scale detention of ethnic and religious minorities since the Holocaust. Critics of the policy have described it as the sinicisation of Xinjiang and called it an ethnocide or cultural genocide, with many NGOs, human rights activists, government officials, and the US government calling it a genocide.

Critics of the programme have highlighted the concentration of Uyghurs in re-education camps, suppression of Uyghur religious practices, political indoctrination, severe ill-treatment, and testimonials of alleged human rights abuses including forced sterilisation and contraception. The Associated Press reported that from 2015 to 2018, birth rates in the mostly Uyghur regions of Hotan and Kashgar plunged by more than 60%. In the same period, the birth rate of the whole country decreased by 9.69%, from 12.07 to 10.9 per 1,000 people. According to a fax received by CNN, Chinese officials acknowledged that birth rates dropped by almost a third in Xinjiang in 2018, but they denied reports of forced sterilisation and genocide. Birth rates have continued to plummet in Xinjiang, falling nearly 24% in 2019 alone when compared to just 4.2% nationwide. According to The Economist, China paid ethnic minority women who were exempt from the standard family planning size limits a lump sum then annual allowance to agree to undergo tubal ligation or IUD implantation after three children in an attempt to keep birthrates to the nationwide standard without imposing strict limits on ethnic minority family sizes. In 2017 the standard rural limit was applied to Uyghurs which lowered their allowed births to the standard for Han Chinese (which had increased from two to three children in 2016).

In 2021, Shirzat Bawudun, the former head of the Xinjiang department of justice, and Sattar Sawut, the former head of the Xinjiang education department, were sentenced to death with a two-year reprieve on separatism and bribery charges. Such a sentence is usually commuted to life imprisonment. Three other educators were sentenced to life in prison.

== Militant groups ==
The Turkistan Islamic Party (TIP) is an Islamist organisation seeking the expulsion of China from "East Turkestan". Since its emergence in 2007 it has claimed responsibility for a number of terrorist attacks, and the Chinese government accuses it of over 200, resulting in 162 deaths and over 440 injuries. Hundreds of Uyghurs are thought to reside in Pakistan and Afghanistan and to have fought alongside extremist groups in conflicts such as the Syrian Civil War. However, the exact size of the Turkistan Islamic Party remains unknown and some experts dispute its ability to orchestrate attacks in China, or that it still exists as a cohesive group.

The TIP is often assumed to be the same as the earlier East Turkestan Islamic Movement (ETIM), which changed its name to the Turkistan Islamic Party after their leader at the time, Hasan Mahsum, was killed by Pakistani forces in 2003.

=== Al-Qaeda links ===
The TIP are believed to have links to al-Qaeda and affiliated groups such as the Islamic Movement of Uzbekistan, and the Pakistani Taliban. Philip B. K. Potter writes that despite the fact that "throughout the 1990s, Chinese authorities went to great lengths to publicly link organizations active in Xinjiang—particularly the ETIM—to al-Qaeda [...] the best information indicates that prior to 2001, the relationship included some training and funding but relatively little operational cooperation." Meanwhile, specific incidents were downplayed by Chinese authorities as isolated criminal acts. However, in 1998 the group's headquarters were moved to Kabul, in Taliban-controlled Afghanistan, while "China's ongoing security crackdown in Xinjiang has forced the most militant Uyghur separatists into volatile neighboring countries, such as Pakistan," Potter writes, "where they are forging strategic alliances with, and even leading, jihadist factions affiliated with al-Qaeda and the Taliban." The East Turkestan Islamic Movement dropped "East" from its name as it increased its domain. The US State Department have listed them as a terrorist organisation since 2002, and as having received "training and financial assistance" from al-Qaeda. In October 2020, this designation was lifted.

A number of members of al-Qaeda have expressed support for the TIP, Xinjiang independence, and/or jihad against China. They include Mustafa Setmariam Nasar, Abu Yahya al-Libi, and late al-Qaeda leader Ayman al-Zawahiri who has on multiple occasions issued statements naming Xinjiang (calling it "East Turkestan") as one of the "battlegrounds" of "jihad to liberate every span of land of the Muslims that has been usurped and violated." Additionally, the al-Qaeda aligned al-Fajr Media Center distributes TIP promotional material.

Andrew McGregor, writing for the Jamestown Foundation, opines that "though there is no question a small group of Uyghur militants fought alongside their Taliban hosts against the Northern Alliance [...] the scores of terrorists Beijing claimed that Bin Laden was sending to China in 2002 never materialized" and that "the TIP's 'strategy' of making loud and alarming threats (attacks on the Olympics, use of biological and chemical weapons, etc.) without any operational follow-up has been enormously effective in promoting China's efforts to characterise Uyghur separatists as terrorists."

== Reactions ==
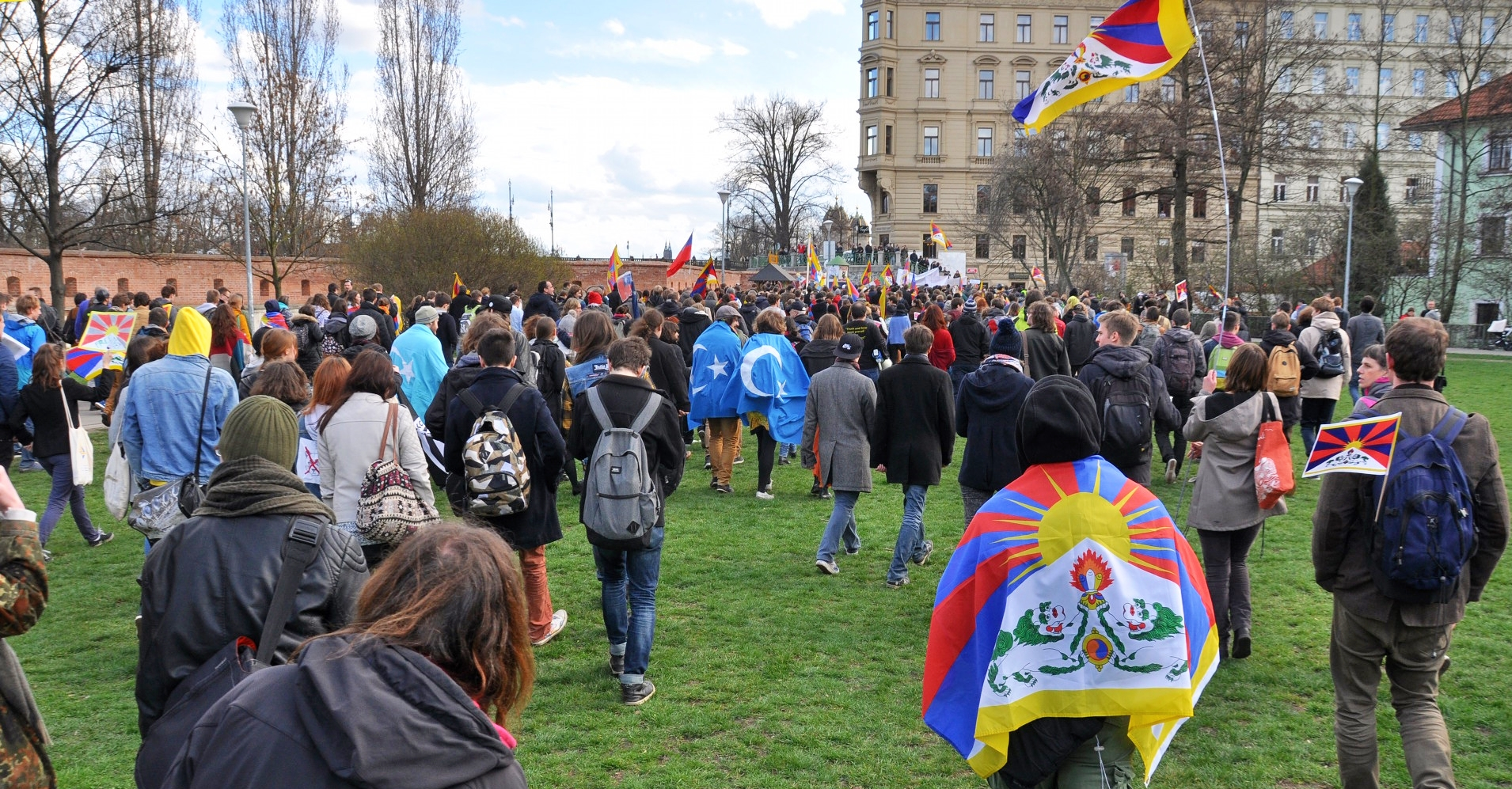
Protesters in Prague, Czech Republic carrying Tibetan and East Turkestan flags, 29 March 2016

In October 2018 and December 2019, Chinese state media aired two documentaries on the conflict and the purported necessity of the re-education camps, which reportedly drew mixed reactions on Chinese social media.

=== East Turkestan Islamic Movement ===
The East Turkestan Islamic Movement has been recognised as a terrorist organisation by the United Nations, the United States, the European Union, Russia, the United Kingdom, Kyrgyzstan, (Note: The Eastern Turkistan Islamic Party, Organization for Freeing Eastern Turkistan and the Islamic Party of Turkistan were outlawed by Kyrgyzstan's Lenin District Court and its Supreme Court in November 2003.) Kazakhstan, Malaysia, Pakistan, Turkey, and the United Arab Emirates. It is also subject to UN sanctions by the Security Council.

=== United Nations ===
In July 2019, 22 countries issued a joint letter to the 41st session of the United Nations Human Rights Council (UNHRC), condemning China's mass detention of Uyghurs and other minorities, calling upon China to "refrain from the arbitrary detention and restrictions on freedom of movement of Uyghurs, and other Muslim and minority communities in Xinjiang".

In the same UNHRC session, 50 countries issued a joint letter supporting China's Xinjiang policies. The letter stated, "China has invited a number of diplomats, international organizations officials and journalist to Xinjiang" and that "what they saw and heard in Xinjiang completely contradicted what was reported in the media."

In October 2019, 23 countries issued a joint statement at the UN urging China to "uphold its national and international obligations and commitments to respect human rights".

In response, 54 countries issued a joint statement supporting China's Xinjiang policies.

UN rights chief Michelle Bachelet met with Xinjiang officials in May 2022 to raise "concerns about the application of counter-terrorism and de-radicalisation measures and their broad application". The World Uyghur Congress and the Washington D.C.-based Campaign for Uyghurs accused Bachelet of parroting Chinese talking points, urging her to resign, and Bachelet announced in June 2022 that she would step down from her role as UN human rights chief. In August 2022, Bachelet released a report concluding that the extent of arbitrary and discriminatory detention of Uyghurs and other Muslim minorities in Xinjiang since 2017—in context of restrictions and deprivation more generally of fundamental rights enjoyed individually and collectively—may constitute international crimes, in particular crimes against humanity.

=== Taiwan ===
The ruling Democratic Progressive Party released a short video on social media urging support for Uyghurs in China and criticising the Chinese government.

=== Uyghur Human Rights Policy Act ===
The United States Senate and House of Representatives passed the Uyghur Human Rights Policy Act in September 2019 and December 2019 respectively in reaction to the conflict. The bill requires United States President Donald Trump to impose sanctions under the Global Magnitsky Act on Xinjiang Communist Party Secretary Chen Quanguo, which would be the first time such sanctions would be imposed on a member of CCP politburo. The bill was signed by President Trump into law on 17 June 2020.

=== Deportation of Uyghurs ===
Hundreds of Uyghurs fleeing China through Southeast Asia have been deported back by the governments of Cambodia, Thailand, Malaysia, and others, drawing condemnation from the US, the UNHCR, and human rights groups. The US State Department said deported Uyghurs "could face harsh treatment and a lack of due process" while the UNHCR and Human Rights Watch have called the deportations a violation of international law. Alternatively, countries such as Germany have altered immigration policies to prevent the extradition of Uyghurs back to China, along with Malaysia, as of 2020, following suit.

=== Involvement of foreign enterprises ===
The role of commercial entities has become increasingly scrutinised, due to the presence of Western enterprises such as Coca-Cola, Volkswagen and Siemens in the region. The major concern here is the fact that the presence of these entities could finance human rights violations and enable the supervision of ethnic minorities by technological cooperation. Moreover, reports have claimed that forced labour prevails in Xinjiang's textile industry.

Based on these allegations, international organisations such as the World Bank have begun to reconsider their involvement in Xinjiang, while textile manufacturers including Adidas or Badger Sportswear have withdrawn from Xinjiang. Divestment also concerns collaboration in the realm of AI and digital technologies, and some enterprises have decided to discontinue the handover of technologies and knowledge to Chinese entities involved in the human rights violations in Xinjiang.

=== Chinese government response ===
The Chinese government's primary response to allegations of human rights violations has been to deny the allegations. In the context of the Xinjiang conflict, China is doing just that, while maintaining that they are placing Uyghurs into re-education camps to prevent the spread of separatist ideology and terrorist rhetoric in the country. China has used its membership on the Economic and Social Council's (ECOSOC) NGO Committee to block NGOs advocating on behalf of Uyghurs from being granted UN accreditation.

== Outside China ==
Due to the increasing tensions between Uyghurs and China, the conflict has also stemmed beyond the Chinese border.

During the Syrian civil war, a Chinese hostage was murdered by the Islamic State, which claimed its desire to fight against China over Xinjiang. These militants are also very active in Syria, mostly Idlib, where it formed to be one of the most radical fighting groups in the conflict, which prompted China to take cautious reactions.

A number of Uyghur militants have been recruited by ISIS and have had a presence in Southeast Asia, with some joining Mujahidin Indonesia Timor.

== See also ==
- List of ongoing armed conflicts
- Turkic settlement of the Tarim Basin
- Pan-Islamism and Pan-Turkism
- Three Evils
- Han chauvinism
- Borders of China
