= 2015 Aksu colliery attack =

Terrorist attack in Xinjiang, China

- Part of the Xinjiang conflict
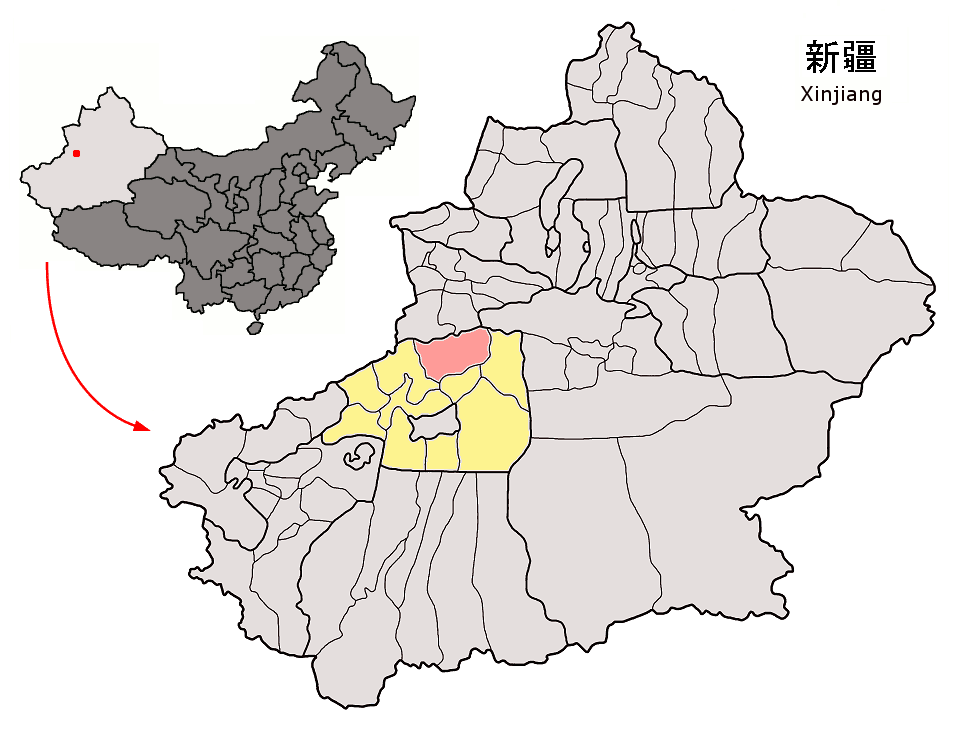
- Location of Baicheng County (red) in Aksu Prefecture (yellow) and Xinjiang
- Location: 41°10′N 80°15′E; Baicheng County, Aksu Prefecture, Xinjiang, China
- Date: 18 September 2015
- Target: Aksu coal mine workers
- Attack type: Knife attack
- Deaths: 16 (per Xinjiang Daily); 50 (Per Radio Free Asia)
- Injuries: 18 (per Xinjiang Daily); 50 (Per Radio Free Asia)
- Perpetrator: Xinjiang separatists
- No. of participants: 29

The 2015 Aksu colliery attack, also known as the Baicheng incident, took place on 18 September 2015 in China, when a group of separatists, suspected to be Uyghurs, attacked workers and security guards at a coal mine in Baicheng County in Aksu, Xinjiang, leaving at least 16 dead and 18 wounded according to government sources, with other estimates reaching as high as 50 dead and 50 wounded. When local police arrived at the scene, the attackers rammed the police vehicles with stolen trucks before fleeing into the mountains. The majority of the victims of the attack were members of the Han ethnic group.

== Background ==
The attack was reported as China was celebrating the 60th anniversary of the incorporation of Xinjiang into China and the subsequent establishment of the autonomous region. During the celebrations, Yu Zhengsheng, who was then the Chairman of the Chinese People's Political Consultative Conference, made a statement advocating that troops in the region should play a bigger role in fighting separatism, terrorism and extremism. Xinjiang has seen frequent attacks in past years by members of the Uyghur ethnic group in Xinjiang. The Chinese government states that this is due to foreign-backed Islamic terrorism for the violence.

== Attack ==
The attack on the coal mine occurred at night. The attackers, wielding knives, first attacked security guards before targeting the miners, many of whom were sleeping in their dormitory beds. They then stole trucks and rammed police vehicles that had arrived at the scene, before fleeing into the mountains, and reportedly stole firearms from police. Chinese media initially reported 16 dead, but according to local sources, at least 50 people were killed, including five police officers. Authorities kept news of the attack from spreading until mid-November, while local media was slow to report on it. Some local officials even denied that the attack ever took place.

== Manhunt ==
Following the attack, Chinese authorities kept a tight lid on coverage of the coal mine attack, and Baicheng County was locked down. The Chinese government launched a manhunt for the attackers lasting 56 days. The operation involved helicopters, armored vehicles, and 10,000 people including local volunteers. At one point, authorities used flash grenades and tear gas to try to force a number of suspects out of a cliff-side cave and, when this failed, used flamethrowers, forcing them out before gunning them down.

The manhunt concluded with a total of 28 assailants killed; one member of the group surrendered after being urged to do so by his grandfather according to authorities. A senior police official, Memet Tohtinyaz, was reported killed while pursuing the suspects. Dilxat Raxit, spokesman for the main exiled group the World Uyghur Congress, claimed that the dead included women and children, though these claims could not be verified. According to Xinjiang Daily, the assailants were commanded by a foreign extremist group.
