= Learning English =

Learning English may refer to:

- BBC Learning English, a department of the BBC World Service devoted to English language teaching
- Learning English, Lesson One, an album by the German punk band Die Toten Hosen
- Learning English, a controlled version (about 1500 words) of English used by Voice of America
