= Id Kah Mosque =

Mosque in Kashgar, Xinjiang, China

- ھېيتگاھ مەسچىتى (Uyghur); 艾提尕尔清真寺 (Chinese)
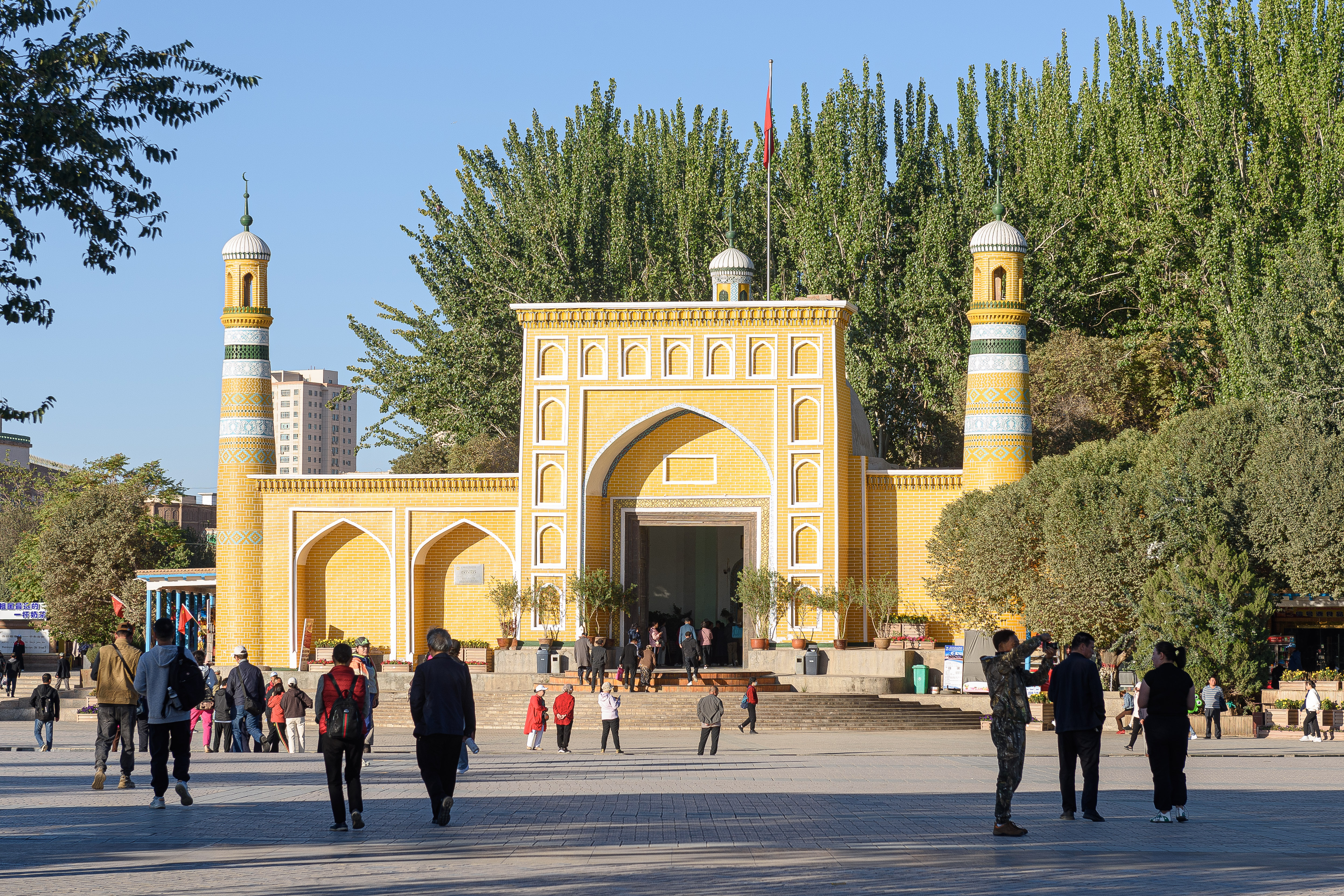
- The Id Kah Mosque in 2023

- Location of the mosque in Xinjiang

Religion
- Affiliation: Islam
- Status: Active as a tourist site; closed to worship except for elderly worshipers on select days.

Location
- Location: Kashgar, Xinjiang
- Country: China
- Interactive map of Id Kah Mosque
- Coordinates: 39°28′20″N 75°59′03″E

Architecture
- Architect: Saqsiz Mirza
- Type: Mosque
- Style: Ming
- Completed: 1442 CE

Specifications
- Capacity: 20,000 worshipers
- Length: 120 m (390 ft)
- Width: 140 m (460 ft)
- Interior area: 16,800 m^{2} (181,000 sq ft)
- Minaret: 3
- Minaret height: 18 m (59 ft)

Major cultural heritage sites under national-level protection
- Official name: Id Kah Mosque 艾提尕尔清真寺
- Type: Cultural
- Criteria: Religion
- Designated: 25 June 2001
- Reference no.: 5-0440-3-246

Uyghur name
- Uyghur: ھېيتگاھ مەسچىتى
Transcriptions
- Latin Yëziqi: Hëytgah Meschiti
- Siril Yëziqi: Хейтгах Месчити

Chinese name
- Simplified Chinese: 艾提尕尔清真寺
- Traditional Chinese: 艾提尕爾清真寺
Transcriptions
Standard Mandarin
- Hanyu Pinyin: Àitígǎ'ěr Qīngzhēnsì

The Id Kah Mosque (Uyghur: ھېيتگاھ مەسچىتى, romanized: Hëytgah Meschiti; Chinese: 艾提尕尔清真寺; pinyin: Àitígǎ'ěr Qīngzhēnsì; derived from Persian: عیدگاه, romanized: Eidgāh, lit. 'Place of Festivities') is a mosque in Kashgar, Xinjiang, China. With the capacity of 20,000 worshipers inside the mosque and its sahn, it is the largest mosque in China.

Completed in the 15th century with subsequent renovations, during the 20th and 21st centuries the mosque was a key focal point for civil unrest centered on the Uyghurs, including the Xinjiang conflict and ongoing human rights abuses. The mosque has been mostly closed for worship since 2016 due to Chinese authorities' attempts to limit religious extremism and terrorism. It is open to elderly worshipers on select holy days. As of 2026, the Id Kah Mosque is open to visitors for two hours each in the morning and afternoon every day.

== History ==
2014 Eid al-Adha prayer in front of the mosque

The mosque was built in 1442 CE by Saqsiz Mirza, the elder of two sons of Amir Sayyid Ali, to commemorate his ancestors, and incorporated older structures dating from 996 CE. The mosque's modern golden-brick structure was built in 1798, replacing the older building, and was further expanded in 1838 to its current size.

On 9 August 1933, Hui General Ma Zhancang killed and beheaded the Uyghur leader Timur Beg, displaying his head on a spike at Id Kah mosque. In March 1934, it was reported that the Uyghur emir Abdullah Bughra was beheaded and had his head displayed at Id Kah Mosque. In April 1934, the Hui general Ma Zhongying gave a speech at Id Kah Mosque, telling the local Uyghur populace to be loyal to the Kuomintang and the Republic of China government in Nanjing.

Akbar Rafsanjani, the president of Iran, visited the mosque in September 1992.

The mosque was listed as a Chinese major cultural heritage site in 2001.

In 2009, Id Kah was the largest mosque both in Xinjiang and in China. Every Friday, it housed nearly 10,000 worshippers and could accommodate up to 20,000. On other days of the week, around 2,000 Muslims came to the mosque to pray. In 2011, between 4,000 and 5,000 people attended Friday prayers in the mosque.

=== Recent developments ===
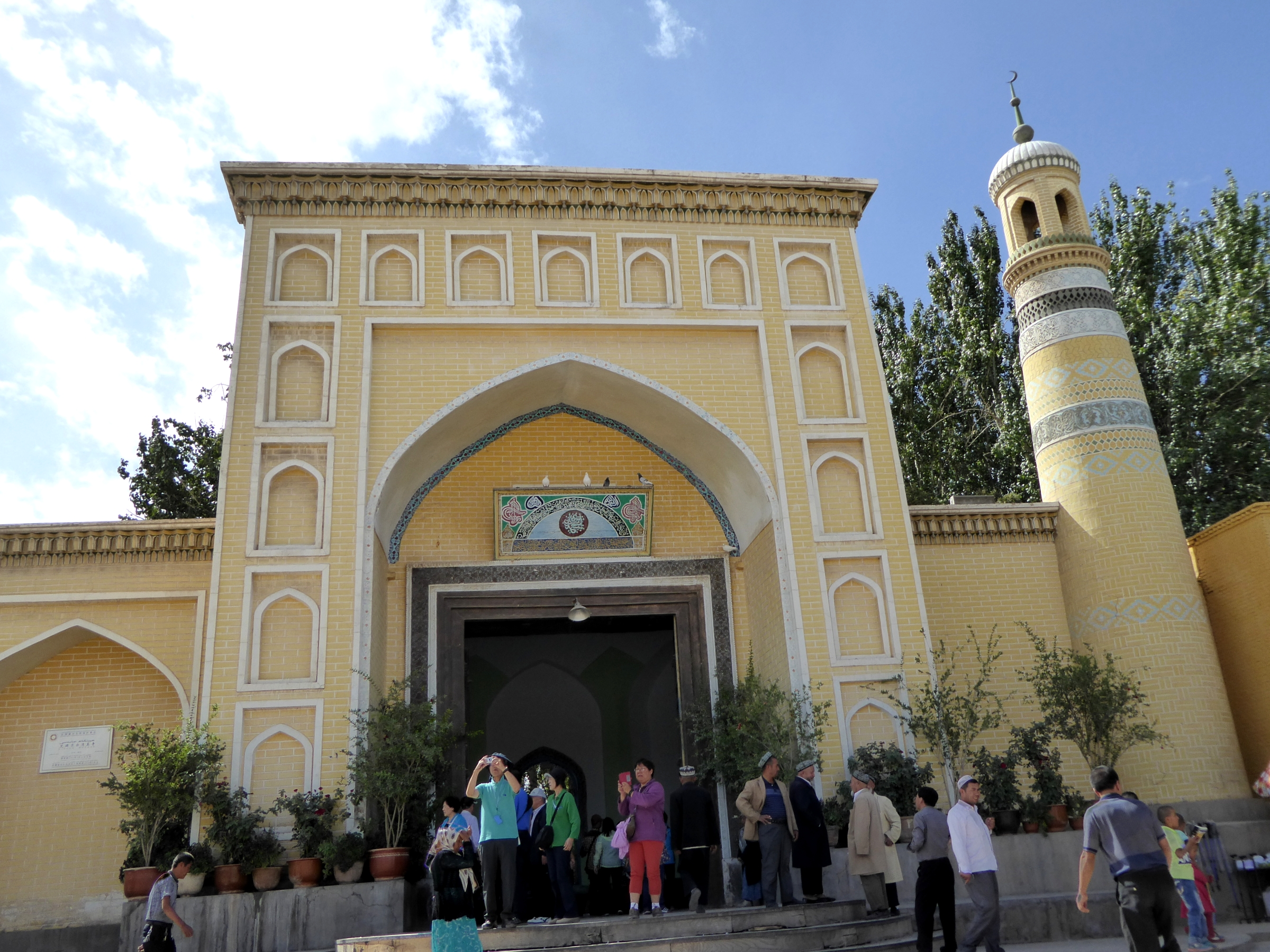
The mosque entrance in 2015, with the removed plaque visible above the doors.

On 30 July 2014, the imam of the mosque at the time, Jume Tahir, was stabbed to death by extremists shortly after attending morning prayers. His unknown successor was jailed for 15 years by the Chinese authorities in 2017, having been accused of spreading extremism.

Radio Free Asia reported in 2018 that a plaque containing Quranic scriptures, which had long hung outside the front entrance of the mosque, had been removed by authorities. Turghunjan Alawudun of the World Uyghur Congress said that the move was "one aspect of the Chinese regime’s evil policies meant to eliminate the Islamic faith among Uyghurs, to eliminate Uyghur faith, literary works, and language." In May 2020, Radio Free Asia again reported on the removal of the plaque.

The mosque's current imam, Memet Jume, said in a 2021 interview with the Associated Press that the number of worshippers attending Friday prayers at the mosque had dropped to between 800 and 900 in 2021. He attributed the drop to "a natural shift in values", rather than Chinese government policies.

The Independent and The Globe and Mail have reported that the Id Kah Mosque has been transformed from a working mosque into a tourist attraction. Since 2016, it has been mostly closed to worshipers, opening only on select holy days to small groups of elderly adherents. Henryk Szadziewski from the US-based Uyghur Human Rights Project told Radio Free Asia that while the mosque remains standing, "its disappearance would cause outrage given its importance. The significance of its existence to the Chinese authorities is to demonstrate to the world observance of Uyghurs' religious freedoms." According to Uyghur imam Ali Akbar Dumallah, who fled China in 2012, scenes of small groups of people praying at the Id Kah and other mosques are staged by the government for visitors. According to the World Uyghur Congress, a mass celebration that took place outside Id Kah Mosque during the 2021 celebration Eid al-Fitr was staged as part of a propaganda facade by Chinese authorities to attempt to falsely portray Xinjiang as a region with strong religious freedom and to whitewash its religious repression in the region.

== Architecture ==
The mosque incorporates architectural features observed in Central Asian, West Asian and to a lesser extent, Chinese architecture. The mosque is centered around the prayer hall and has a courtyard on both sides of it.

The Id Kah Mosque covers an area of approximately 16,800 square metres (181,000 sq ft). It consists of a chapel, a sutra hall, a gate tower and some other auxiliary buildings. The temple gate is made of yellow bricks, the gate is 4.7 metres (15 ft) high, 4.3 metres (14 ft) wide, and the gate building is approximately 17 metres (56 ft) high. Two 18-metre-high (59 ft) minarets were built asymmetrically on both sides of the gate tower, and a crescent moon stands on the top of the tower. At dawn each day, the imam in the temple will climb the tower five times and call for Muslims to come and worship. Behind the gate tower is a large arch, with a minaret at the top.

The mosque was renovated in 1981, and the mosque's façade was covered with tiles between 2004 and 2005.

== See also ==
- Islam in China
- List of mosques in China
- List of Major National Historical and Cultural Sites in Xinjiang
- Sinicization
