= Zhang Xuezhong =

Zhang Xuezhong may refer to:

- Zhang Xuezhong (general) (Chinese: 張雪中; 1899–1995), Republic of China general
- Zhang Xuezhong (politician) (Chinese: 张学忠; born 1943), Communist Party chief of Sichuan Province, China
- Zhang Xuezhong (academic) (Chinese: 張雪忠; born 1976), dismissed lecturer at East China University of Political Science and Law
