= BBC English =

BBC English may refer to:

- BBC English Regions, a division of the BBC responsible for service in England
- BBC Learning English, a department of the BBC devoted to English language teaching
- Received Pronunciation, an accent spoken by some people in the United Kingdom and once considered the "standard accent"
