= Five Poisons =

Ancient Chinese set of poisonous or otherwise hazardous animals

The Five Poisons (Chinese: 五毒; pinyin: wǔ dú; Jyutping: ng5 duk6; Vietnamese: Ngũ độc), or the five noxious creatures, can refer to an ancient Chinese set of poisonous or otherwise hazardous animals or five perceived threats the Chinese Communist Party sees for its rule over China.

== Ancient Chinese Five Poisons ==
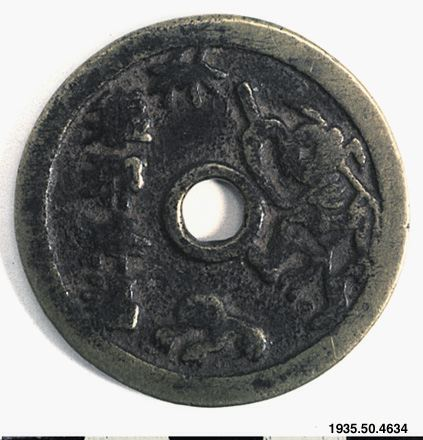
A Chinese Five Poisons charm with the inscription "Expel evil and send down good fortune" (驱邪降福) with a spider at the top and the three-legged toad, Jin Chan, at the bottom. There is disagreement with the figure on the right, either believed to be Liu Hai or Zhong Kui. The charm is on display at the Museum of Ethnography, Sweden.

The fifth day of the fifth month or Duanwu in ancient Chinese folklore symbolised the beginning of the Summer, this day also known as "Double 5 day" or "Double 5th day" or more commonly tiān zhōng jié (天中節) was seen as one of the most inauspicious and dangerous days of the year. This was because all the poisonous animals and bugs would then begin to appear. "Double five" day was furthermore seen as the hottest day and it was believed that the heat would cause illness.

The Ancient Chinese believed that the only way to combat poison was with poison, and one way they believed that they could protect themselves on this day was by drinking realgar wine which contains arsenic sulfide, another way to protect themselves on this day was by hanging pictures of Zhong Kui, another custom holds that the Chinese should mix mercury (cinnabar) with wine, or using Gu poison to combat these creatures, however by far the most common way of protecting themselves was using "Five poison" charms and amulets (五毒錢), it was also customary for Chinese parents to let their children wear these amulets that have pictures of the 5 poisons or otherwise hang small pouches filled with mugwort around the necks of these children. The five poisons in this context don't refer to five actual toxins but to five animals that were perceived to be "poisonous", these animals according to various historical sources usually included:

- Snakes
- Scorpions
- Centipedes
- Toads
- Spiders

But in some variants toads were replaced by Jin Chan, and in other variants tigers are members of the 5 poisons. Tigers are then considered members of the five poisons because they are solitary animals and the Mandarin Chinese word for "solitary" has a similar pronunciation as the word for "poison". In some variations the tiger is not a member of the five poisons but is used to represent the Warring States period person Qu Yuan because he was born on a "tiger day".

In Vietnam their variant of these amulets are used during the dragon boat festival.

=== Wudu cakes ===
The Wudu cake is a traditional food for the Dragon Boat Festival in north China. Wudu cakes are traditionally believed to have talismanic powers and are traditionally eaten to stay healthy and attract good fortune. Wudu cakes typically come in sets of five cakes with the design of each of the animals of the five poisons on them.

== Chinese Communist Party version ==
According to commentators and government documents, the Five Poisons are five perceived threats to the stability of the rule of the Chinese Communist Party. These threat groups provide an alternative vision of China. Moreover, the reason they pose the threat is that they operate inside and outside China. One of the responsibilities of the Ministry of State Security is to gather intelligence and target the Five Poisons.

=== The Five Poisons of the Chinese Communist Party ===
The 'five poisons' are:

- Uyghur supporters of the East Turkestan independence movement
- Tibetan supporters of the Tibetan independence movement
- adherents of the Falun Gong and members of xiejiao
- members of the Chinese democracy movement
- advocates for the Taiwan independence movement

== See also ==
- Seven Don't Mentions
- Three Evils
- List of poisonous animals
- Strike Hard Campaign Against Violent Terrorism
