= 2013 Xinjiang ethnic clashes =

2013 Xinjiang ethnic clashes may refer to:

- April 2013 Bachu unrest
- June 2013 Shanshan riots
