= Tianshannet =

Chinese government website

- Founded: 18 December 2001
- Political alignment: Chinese Communist Party
- Headquarters: Xinjiang
- Website: english.ts.cn (in English)

Tianshannet (Chinese: 天山网; pinyin: Tiānshān Wǎng; lit. 'Tian Shan Net') is the sole official news website of Xinjiang, China. The website was established by the government of Xinjiang Uygur Autonomous Region and the People's Daily Online on December 18, 2001. Tianshannet includes Mandarin Chinese, Russian, Uyghur, English and Kazakh language versions.

In July 2006, the English version of Tianshannet was started.

In August 2007, BBC Learning English announced a partnership with Tianshannet.

In July 2009, the Kazakh version of Tianshannet was started.

== See also ==
- Xinjiang Daily
- Xinjiang People's Broadcasting Station
