= United Revolutionary Front of East Turkestan =

Uyghur separatist group (1969–2001)

United National Revolutionary Front of East Turkestan
- شەرقىي تۇركىستان بىرلەشمە مىللىي ئىنقىلابىي فرونتى
- Leader: Yusupbek Mukhlisi
- Founded: 1975
- Dissolved: 2001
- Active regions: Xinjiang, China
- Ideology: Uyghur nationalism; East Turkestan independence
- Wars: the Xinjiang conflict

The United National Revolutionary Front of East Turkestan also known as the United Revolutionary Front of East Turkestan (URFET) (Russian: Объединённый революционный фронт Восточного Туркестана; Chinese: 東突厥斯坦聯合革命陣線) was a Uyghur nationalist group in the Soviet Union and Xinjiang that participated in the Xinjiang conflict as an armed separatist force. It was led by Yusupbek Mukhlisi, who operated in-exile with other former URFET members in Almaty, Kazakhstan.

According to retired GRU (Soviet Union) (Soviet military intelligence) officer Vladimir Suvurov, the Soviet Union helped establish the United Revolutionary Front of East Turkestan in Almaty in 1975 during the height of Sino-Soviet tensions as a means of destabilizing Xinjiang.

The group was allegedly supported logistically by the Soviet Union until 1989. In September 2001, the URFET merged with the Uyghur Liberation Organisation (ULO) and became the Uyghurstan People's Party.
