= 2014 Luntai County bombings =

Terrorist attack in Xinjiang, China

- Part of the Xinjiang conflict
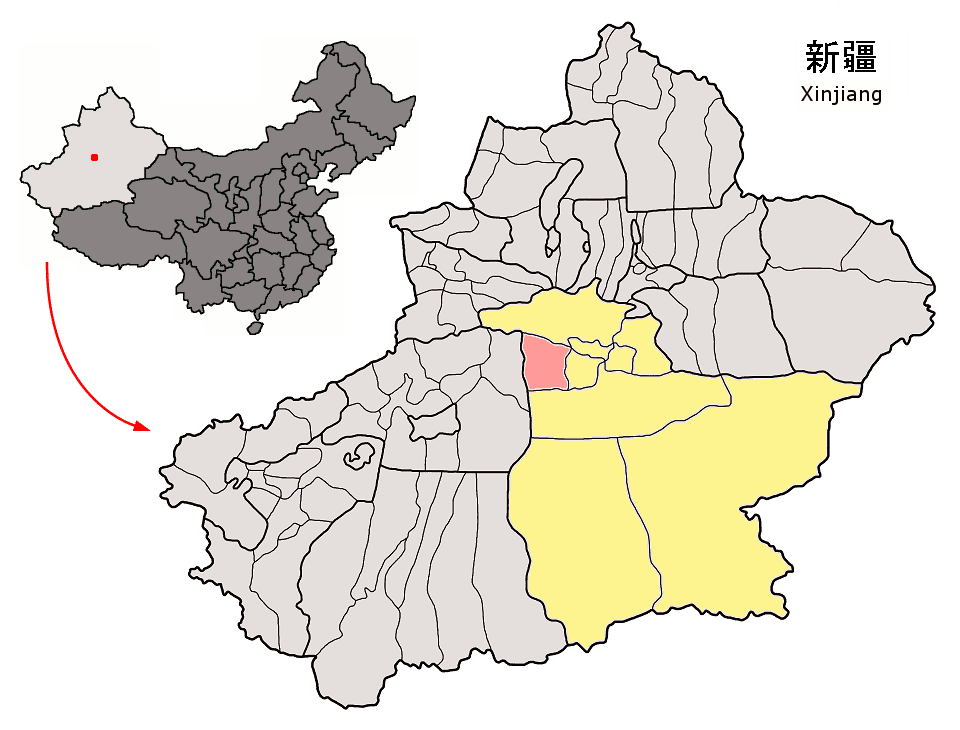
- Location of Luntai County (red) within Bayingolin Prefecture (yellow) and Xinjiang
- Location: Luntai County, Xinjiang
- Date: 21 September, 2014
- Weapon: Explosives
- Deaths: 50 (6 civilians, 4 police, 40 attackers)
- Injuries: 54

On September 21, 2014, a series of bombings occurred in Luntai County in Xinjiang, China. Authorities initially stated that two people were killed in the violence, but revised the figures upwards to 50 dead.

== Attack ==
Chinese state media reported what was described as an "organized and serious" terror attack occurring on 21 September. The violence took place at two police stations, as well as a shop and a produce market in the county. Initial reports put the death toll at two dead, but later announcements by authorities raised the reported death toll to 50. Among the deaths were six civilians, two police officers, and two auxiliary police. Forty attackers, described as 'rioters', were also killed, either blowing themselves up or being shot dead by police. Two attackers were captured.

== Aftermath ==
A curfew was imposed in the area following the violence. Local Chinese officials named Maimaiti Tursun, who was killed in the incident, as the ringleader behind the attack.
