= Seven Don't Mentions =

Chinese Communist Party slogan

Seven Don't Mentions (Chinese: 七不讲; pinyin: Qī bù jiǎng) are the requirements by the Central Committee of the Chinese Communist Party for Chinese college teachers. They were first mentioned by Zhang Xuezhong, a teacher at East China University of Political Science and Law, on Weibo, and later confirmed by other scholars and professors. The instructions were not written down, but were verbally communicated by relevant leaders during meetings.

== Content ==
Zhang Xuezhong published the "Seven Don't Mentions" on Weibo, accusing this of being the official speech control policy released by the Chinese Communist Party under Xi Jinping's general secretaryship:

1. Don't talk about universal values
2. Don't talk about press freedom
3. Don't talk about civil society
4. Don't talk about civil rights
5. Don't talk about the historical mistakes of the Chinese Communist Party
6. Don't talk about the official bourgeoisie (Note: Translation according to Bandurski. Original text: Chinese: 权贵资产阶级; pinyin: quán guì zī chǎn jiē jí)
7. Don't talk about judicial independence

== Follow-up ==
All Internet content related to the notice were deleted or blocked. Zhang Xuezhong, who first exposed the "Seven Don'ts", was disqualified from teaching undergraduate courses at East China University of Political Science and Law because he expressed his views on Hong Kong's national education in September 2012. He also wrote a letter to Yuan Guiren, the Minister of Education, requesting that courses such as Marxism, Maoism, and Deng Xiaoping Theory be removed from university public courses.

== See also ==
- Five Poisons
- Ideology of the Chinese Communist Party
- Document Number Nine § The Seven Noteworthy Problems
- Three Evils
