= Yusupbek Mukhlisi =

Uyghur separatist leader (1920–2004)

- يۈسۈپبەگ مۇخلىسى

Leader of the United Revolutionary Front of East Turkestan and the East Turkistan National Committee
- In office 1975 – August 8, 2004
- Preceded by: Position established
- Succeeded by: Position abolished

Personal details
- Born: 1920 Atush, Republic of China
- Died: August 8, 2004 (aged 84) Almaty, Kazakhstan
- Party: United Revolutionary Front of East Turkestan
- Children: Modan Muklisi

Military service
- Allegiance: Second East Turkistan Republic
- Branch/service: East Turkistan National Army
- Years of service: 1945–1949
- Rank: Lieutenant Colonel

Yusupbek Mukhlisi (1920–2004) was a Uyghur nationalist, former military officer, and the leader of the United Revolutionary Front of East Turkestan (URFET) who advocated for the restoration of an independent East Turkistan Republic.

== Early life ==
Yusupbek Mukhlisi was born into a Uyghur family in the town of Atush and later moved to the city of Chöchek with his family in 1929. In 1935, at age 15, he enrolled into the provincial gymnasium school in Urumchi and later studied at the former Xinjiang Institute (know known as Xinjiang University until the 1940). Following the declaration of the Second East Turkistan Republic on November 12, 1944, Yusupbek Mukhlisi joined the East Turkistan Republic's National Army (Ili National Army) and rose to the rank of Lieutenant Colonel. After the overthrowal of the Second East Turkistan Republic and the incorporation of the East Turkistan National Army (Ili National Army) on December 22, 1949, Mukhlisi spent the periods of 1950–1958 traveling across the Uyghur heartland in Tarim Basin engaging in cultural and historical research. In the early parts of 1959, Mukhlisi was labelled as a "local nationalist" by the Chinese authorities and sent to work in a forced labor camp in the Turpan region.

== Life in exile ==
Mukhlisi lived in-exile with other former East Turkistan Republic (ETR) members in Almaty, Kazakhstan, after fleeing to the Soviet Union in 1960. He co-founded the National Committee for East Turkistan in late 1960s along with former Second East Turkistan Republic officials, including General Zunun Taipov and Colonel Ziya Samedi to advocate for the independence of East Turkistan. He began handwriting and publishing the "Voice of East Turkistan" newspaper in the Uyghur language in 1979. He created the United Revolutionary Front of East Turkestan in 1975 in Almaty, Kazakhstan with the help of the GRU (Soviet Union) to wage armed resistance to liberate East Turkistan.

In 1996 Mukhlisi travelled to the United States to meet with members of the U.S. Congress and the U.S. State Department and the next year he announced an armed campaign against China. He again met with U.S. State Department officials in Washington, DC in 1997.

Along with Taynutdin Basakov, Mukhlisi led the Committee for East Turkestan until its dissolution around the late 1990s.
