= Xinjiang Daily =

Chinese Communist Party newspaper

- Native name: 新疆日报
- Type: Daily newspaper
- Format: Broadsheet
- Owner: Xinjiang Uygur Autonomous Regional Committee of the Chinese Communist Party
- Founded: 1949
- Political alignment: Chinese Communist Party
- Language: Chinese, Uyghur, Mongolian and Kazakh
- Headquarters: 1 Yangzijiang Road (扬子江路), Saybagh District, Urumqi, Xinjiang Uyghur Autonomous Region, China
- Circulation: 124,000
- Website: www.xjdaily.com

The Xinjiang Daily (Chinese: 新疆日报; pinyin: Xīnjiāng Rìbào, Uyghur: شىنجاڭ گېزىتى, Mongolian: ᠰᠢᠨᠵᠢᠶᠠᠩ ‍ᠳ
ᠰᠲ‍ᠣ‍ᠷ ‍ᠳ
ᠰᠣ‍ᠨᠢᠨ ‍ᠣ
ᠰᠥᠯᠵᠢᠶ ‍ᠠ᠋, Kazakh: شينجياڭ گازەتى) is an official publication of the Xinjiang Uygur Autonomous Regional Committee of the Chinese Communist Party and is published daily by Xinjiang Daily Publishing at 1 Yangzijiang Road, Saybagh District, Urumqi, Xinjiang Uyghur Autonomous Region, People's Republic of China. The newspaper is notable in that it is published in 4 languages, namely Chinese, which uses Chinese characters, Uyghur, in the Uyghur Arabic alphabet, Mongolian, in the Mongolian script and Kazakh, in the Kazakh Arabic alphabet. The newspaper includes news that focuses on the Xinjiang Uyghur Autonomous Region but also includes a small amount of national and international news.

== Background ==
The newspaper was first published in October 1915 under the name "The Xinjiang Gazette" 新疆公报 Xīnjiāng Gōngbào. In 1918, it was renamed the "Tianshan News" 天山报 Tiānshān Bào and in 1929 it was renamed the "Tianshan Daily" 天山日报 Tiānshān Rìbào, before getting its current name in November 1935. In 1949 the newspaper became the organ of the CCP. The newspaper has had an online version since 2004.

== Languages ==
All main content is written in Chinese and translated into the other languages. Translated articles in Uyghur, Mongolian and Kazakh take up more space than the original Chinese text. This is partly from the natural phenomenon, text expansion, common to translated material, but font sizes are also larger in the translated versions. The Chinese version typically contains 8 pages in a weekday edition, and the Uyghur, Mongolian, and Kazakh versions contain 4 pages. Since the Uyghur, Mongolian, and Kazakh versions contain fewer pages and take up more space per article, those three versions contain only a selection of the content in the Chinese version.

	Name in local script	Domestic Integrated Publication Code (国内统一刊号)	Postal Dispatch Code (邮发代号)	Overseas Code (国外代号)	Date of first issue	Pages per issue
Chinese	In Chinese characters: 新疆日报 In Chinese Pinyin: Xīnjiāng Rìbào	CN65-0001	57-2	D921	6 December 1949	8
Uyghur	In the Uyghur Arabic alphabet: شىنجاڭ گېزىتى In the Uyghur Latin Alphabet (ULA): Shinjang Gëziti; In the Uyghur New Script (UYY): Xinjang Geziti; In the Uyghur Cyrillic alphabet (USY): Шинҗаң Гезити	CN65-0002/-W	57-1	-	1 January 1950	4
Mongolian	In the Mongolian script: ᠰᠢᠨᠵᠢᠶᠠᠩ ‍ᠳ ᠰᠲ‍ᠣ‍ᠷ ‍ᠳ ᠰᠣ‍ᠨᠢᠨ ‍ᠣ ᠰᠥᠯᠵᠢᠶ ‍ᠠ᠋ In Latin script: Šinǰiyang-giin ödör-in sonin	CN65-0004/-M	57-3	-	1 August 1950	4
Kazakh	In the Kazakh Arabic alphabet: شينجياڭ گازەتى In the Kazakh Latin alphabet: Şinjiañ Gazetı	CN65-0003/-H	57-13	-	1 January 1950	4

== See also ==
- Tianshannet
