= Zhang Xuezhong (academic) =

Chinese academic

- Born: 1976 (age 49–50); Jiangxi
- Occupations: human rights lawyer, academic
- Years active: 2000–present
- Known for: defending Chinese constitutionalism
- Notable work: New Common Sense

Chinese name
- Simplified Chinese: 张雪忠
- Traditional Chinese: 張雪忠
Transcriptions
Standard Mandarin
- Hanyu Pinyin: Zhāng Xuězhōng

Zhang Xuezhong (simplified Chinese: 张雪忠; traditional Chinese: 張雪忠; pinyin: Zhāng Xuězhōng; born 1976) is a Chinese academic of constitutional law and a human rights lawyer. He was a lecturer at the East China University of Political Science and Law from 2001 to 2013. Prior to his dismissal from the institution, he was known for calling for constitutionalism and giving more meaningful effect to the Constitution of China's guarantees of human rights. In his capacity as a human rights lawyer he has defended members of the New Citizens' Movement.

Zhang was also one of the academics who revealed the "Seven Don't Mentions" that may not be taught in Chinese universities. Zhang thinks that one-party rule in China is on an illegal footing and has also called for the cessation of teaching of Marxism in universities.

In May 2020 Zhang issued an open letter criticising the government's handling of the coronavirus outbreak and calling for freedom of speech. Soon after he was taken into custody by police.

== Career and dismissal ==
Zhang studied law at a college in Chongqing. He became lawyer in 2000 and started teaching civil code and commercial law at the East China University of Political Science and Law in Shanghai in 2001. He was an associate professor of civil law and lecturer at the university until 2013. He is also known as a human rights lawyer. He has defended arrested people who had affiliated with the New Citizens' Movement. He has also defended Weiquan movement member Guo Feixiong in court.

Zhang was, in September 2012, among the first academics revealing the Seven Don't Mentions in the Chinese university education. These banned subjects are: universal values, press freedom, civil society, civil rights, Chinese Communist Party's historical mistakes, oligarchical capitalism and judicial independence.

On 9 December 2013, Zhang was notified that he would be fired due to not apologizing for writings championing the Chinese constitution's protections. New Common Sense, an online book written by him, states that one-party rule is illegal. His teaching privileges had been temporarily suspended earlier in August by the university's Communist Party committee. There has been a wide suppression of free thinkers in China. Zhang himself has remarked that his dismissal was part of scare tactics by the party, and has questioned legality of the university's Communist Party committee, as he is not a member of the Chinese Communist Party.

Xi Jinping's new government had been hoped to bring more tolerance for calls on reform. Zhang's dismissal has been seen as an evidence of the party's increasing intolerance towards dissent. Zhang has said in an interview that asking democratic reforms is sensitive and would not result in a response, but that some scholars ask for constitutionalism instead as it avoids the issue of a single-party or a multi-party system. However, the Chinese state has accused constitutionalism for being a Western plot trying to cause a regime change.

== Opinions ==
Zhang has demanded in an open letter to the Minister of Education of the People's Republic of China that teaching Marxism should be ceased in the Chinese education. Zhang dismisses views that uphold that the Chinese electorate would not be informed enough to practice democracy.

== Personal life ==
Zhang is a native of Yugan County, Jiangxi, and was born there to a merchant father and a nurse mother.

== Works ==
- 新常识 [New Common Sense: The Nature and Consequences of One-Party Dictatorship] (in Chinese). 2013.
- Letscorp.net - letscorp Resources and Information 2013反宪政逆流的根源及危险 [The Origin and the Perils of the Anti-constitutionalism Campaign in 2013] (in Chinese). 4 June 2013.

== See also ==
- Chinese democracy movement
- Human rights in China#Civil liberties
- Protest and dissent in China
- Xia Yeliang, another dismissed academic
