= 1997 Ürümqi bus bombings =

Separatist attacks in Xinjian, China

- Part of the Xinjiang conflict
- Location of Ürümqi in Xinjiang, China
- Location: Ürümqi, Xinjiang, China
- Date: February 25, 1997
- Attack type: Bus bombing
- Deaths: 9 (including 3 children)
- Injuries: 28
- Perpetrator: Uyghur separatists

On February 25, 1997, 3 bombs exploded on 3 buses (lines 2, 10, and 44) in Ürümqi, Xinjiang, China. 9 people were killed, including at least 3 children, and a further 28 were injured. Another 2 devices in the south railway station (the main station in Ürümqi) failed to explode. Steel balls, screws, and nails were found in the bombs.

Uyghur terrorist had committed the bombings. Responsibility for the attacks was claimed and acknowledged by factions of certain diaspora Uyghurs.

== External reference ==
- 新疆遭遇的暴力恐怖事件(cn)
- 新疆曾遭遇暴力恐怖高峰(cn)
