= Three Evils =

Chinese Communist Party political slogan

- Simplified Chinese: 三股势力
- Literal meaning: three streams of forces
Transcriptions

The Three Evils is a political slogan of the Chinese Communist Party (CCP) defined as terrorism, separatism (often translated as "splittism" by Chinese state media) and religious extremism. The phrase refers to declared counter-terrorism operations undertaken by China, Central Asian republics, and Russia, primarily as related to Xinjiang. The CCP views each of the Three Evils as interrelated phenomena driving persistent instability in the westernmost province of Xinjiang, and the slogan has been deployed extensively in support of Xinjiang re-education camps since 2017.

== History ==
Xinjiang is the westernmost province of the People's Republic of China and the historical home of the Uyghur people, who speak a language unrelated to Chinese and predominantly practice Islam. The region has been the site of significant tensions under Chinese rule, and attempted to declare independence first as the short-lived First and Second East Turkestan Republics in 1933 and 1944, respectively, ultimately being occupied by the People's Liberation Army in 1949.

China first seriously faced issues of ethnic violence in Xinjiang beginning in the 1990s, such as with the 1990 Barin uprising, though such incidents were generally classified as "social unrest" until after the September 11 attacks, when the government began to refer to them more in terms of terrorism. Much of the Uyghur discontent stemmed from economic inequality between Uyghurs and Han Chinese migrants, suppression of Uyghur religious practices, and state preference for Han over Uyghur culture, among other issues. Counterterrorism became a much larger Chinese government priority overall after the ascension of Xi Jinping in 2012; following a lull from 2001 to 2007, militant and terrorist activity had increased notably.

== Criticisms ==
Human Rights Watch has criticized counter-terrorism cooperation by members of the Shanghai Cooperation Organisation in targeting the three evils, accusing the members' governments of violating international laws regarding human rights. Holly Cartner, Europe and Central Asia director at Human Rights Watch, said, "For many years SCO governments have been criticized for their poor human rights records. The SCO's policies could worsen human rights conditions and seek to justify abuse. It's therefore imperative that the European Union and the United States place even greater emphasis on human rights issues in the region."

== See also ==
- Five Poisons
- Seven Don't Mentions
- Strike Hard Campaign Against Violent Terrorism
