= Jin Canrong =

Chinese academic

- 金灿荣
- Born: 26 December 1962 (age 63); Wuhan, Hubei, China
- Occupations: Professor, academic, policy adviser
- Title: Vice Dean

Academic background
- Education: Fudan University (BA); Chinese Academy of Social Sciences (MA); Peking University (PhD)

Academic work
- Discipline: Politics of the United States; China–United States relations
- Institutions: School of International Studies, Renmin University of China

Jin Canrong (Chinese: 金灿荣; pinyin: Jīn Cànróng, born 26 December 1962) is a Chinese international relations scholar. He currently serves as professor and vice dean of the School of International Relations of the Renmin University of China.

His focus is on the politics of the United States, foreign policy of the United States and China–United States relations.

== Early life and education ==
Jin Canrong was born in Wuhan on 26 December 1962. His family was originally from Zhejiang and moved to Wuhan in the 1950s as the factory his father worked had relocated there. There were six children in the family all raised by their mother as their father was too busy with work. Their father studied took night classes to become a technician.

When Jin was in third grade at school, he was influenced by the movie Undercover and formed a guerilla group with his classmates with himself as leader. Later he was criticised by the teacher and lost his position of hall monitor.

In his second year of high school, Jin decided to switch from the science stream to the liberal arts stream. In the Gaokao, Jin scored 447 points making him the top scorer in Wuhan province for liberal arts. Originally Jin wanted to attend Peking University because Mao Zedong worked at the library there. However his father who went to Beijing for the first time to attend a conference told Jin that it was too desolate and thought Shanghai was better. As a result, in 1980 Jin enrolled at the School of International Relations and Public Affairs at Fudan University where he majored in political science.

At Fudan University, Jin spent one third of his time studying for his major and the rest reading books on Chinese history and Western philosophy. He was heavily involved in the debate society. After graduating in 1984 he attended Chinese Academy of Social Sciences where he obtained a master's degree in 1987.

== Career ==
After graduation many of Jin's classmates went abroad for research but Jin decided to remain in China where he worked at the academy's institute of American Studies from July 1987 to July 2002. In 1992, Jin participated in an international visitor program of the United States Information Agency and went to the United States to observe the 1992 United States presidential election for a month. Jin noted while the country had a brilliant economy, it could not be copied or imitated. His trip was extended to two years and he returned to China in 1994 as he felt he was destined to have more success there. He wrote his first professional article shortly afterwards which was on the Political Situation in the United States.

From 1995 to 1998, Jin wrote for the column of "Focusing on America" on World Affairs.

From 1996 to 1999, Jin studied at the School of International Studies at Peking University and received a doctorate.

In August 2002, Jin took up an academic post at the School of International Relations of the Renmin University of China where he currently remains.

== Views ==
In August 2024, Jin stated it is very likely that Chinese leadership would move toward armed unification of Taiwan by 2027.

In November 2024 at a forum, Jin stated that Kamala Harris would have a better chance of winning the 2024 United States presidential election. However regardless of who won, China-US relations would continue to be the same. A few days later at another forum, Jin argued that a Trump administration would be easier for China to deal with and that as the election enters the final phase, Trump's chances of winning were getting better and better.

== Controversies ==
=== Questioning the existence of Aristotle ===
In November 2023, a viral video on Douyin of Jin spread where he questioned the existence of Aristotle. He stated there is no written record from before the 13th century that can prove Aristotle's existence. If he existed, it was not possible for him to have written hundreds of books containing millions of words before the arrival of paper in Europe in the 11th century. Mainstream historians criticized Jin's argument as flawed. They stated there was copious evidence of philosophers engaging with Aristotle's ideas and even quoting his texts as early as the 3rd century BC. In addition they claimed Aristotle could have used papyrus and that parchment was not as expensive as initially believed. Aristotle did not complete his works alone and relied on his students to write down some of his oral speeches.

== Personal life ==
Jin's son, Junda attended Peking University and then went to attend graduate school at Johns Hopkins University and Boston University where he obtained both a master's degree and Doctorate. Jin was criticized by netizens as he had previously stated he disapproved of sending children to study in the United States. However some have stated what he meant was he disapproved of sending children too early to study United States. Junda since graduating has returned to China where he works at the Institute of World Economics and Politics under the Chinese Academy of Social Sciences.

== Works ==
=== Books ===
- Canrong, Jin (27 September 2013). Prosperity in China: International Responsibility and Opportunity for a Growing Power. McGraw Hill Professional. ISBN 978-0-07-181993-0.
- Canrong, Jin (April 2013). China's Future: The Path to Prosperity and Peace. Enrich Professional Publishing (S) Private, Limited. ISBN 978-1-62320-015-2.

=== Articles ===
- Canrong, Jin (Fall 2001). "A Response to Ted Osius: Policy Legacy and Political Context in U.S. Relations with China". Asian Affairs. 28 (3): 134–137. doi:10.1080/00927670109601491. ISSN 0092-7678. JSTOR 30172530. S2CID 154443292.
- Canrong, Jin (May 2001). "The US Global Strategy in the Post-Cold War Era and Its Implications for China-United States Relations: A Chinese perspective". Journal of Contemporary China. 10 (27): 309–315. doi:10.1080/10670560125619. ISSN 1067-0564. S2CID 154566075.
