= 2014 China–Vietnam border shootout =

Shootout between Uyghur illegal migrants and Vietnamese border guards

Coordinates: 21°37′28.4″N 107°43′3.8″E

- Part of the Xinjiang conflict
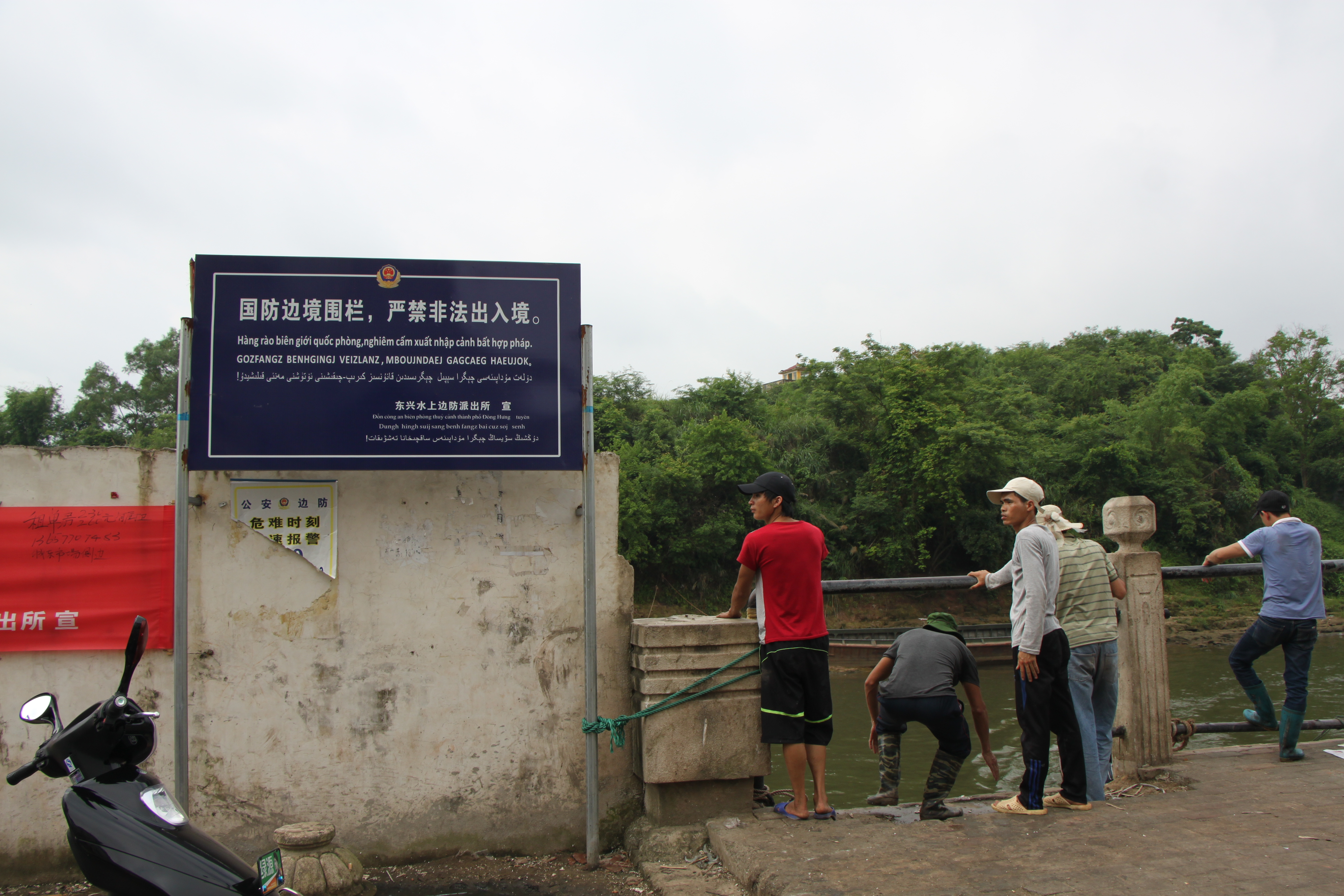
- A warning sign installed on the Chinese side of the border after the shootout. The text – written in Chinese, Vietnamese, Zhuang, and Uyghur – reads: "International border area, unauthorized entry prohibited".
| Date | 18 April 2014 |
| Location | Bắc Phong Sinh border crossing |

Belligerents
| Uyghur illegal migrants | Vietnam Border Guard |

Casualties and losses
| 5 killed 5 wounded | 2 killed 5 wounded |

On 18 April 2014, a group of sixteen Chinese citizens, later identified as ethnic Uyghurs, engaged in a shootout with Vietnamese border guards after seizing their guns as they were being detained to be returned to China. Five Uyghurs and two Vietnamese border guards died in the incident. Ten of the Uyghur perpetrators were men and the rest were women or children.

== Shootout ==
The confrontation began after the guards detained a group of Uyghur illegal migrants inside a border post around noon, with the intention of returning them to the Chinese authorities. Some of the migrants grabbed one or more AK-47 assault rifles from the guards and opened fire on them.

Hundreds of police officers and border guards surrounded the building during the standoff and urged the migrants inside to surrender. Some of the migrants who died had committed suicide, while the others were shot dead by Vietnamese police officers and border guards.
