= BBC Learning English =

Department of the BBC World Service

BBC Learning English is the English language teaching department within BBC World Service. It operates globally via its own website, multiple social media platforms and podcasts and with partners, particularly in China. It provides free English language learning resources for students and teachers.

The department collaborates with other BBC services. It provides the English language teaching segments for the BBC World Service DARS TV project and has worked with BBC Media Action to provide the English-language teaching materials for its Bengali program BBC Janala.

It has a number of partnerships in China and has also worked with numerous external organisations on projects including The Open University, British Council and English My Way.

BBC Learning English has audiences in most countries across the world helping them to develop and improve their English language skills.

The department has won numerous awards, including ELTons from the British Council, an award from MEDEA, the English Speaking Union award for innovation and, as part of BBC Janela, the Microsoft Award for Education and the GSMA Award for education technology.

== Current Platforms ==
Learners and teachers can find BBC Learning English’s content via the following platforms.

- bbclearningenglish.com
- Social Media: YouTube, Instagram, TikTok
- Podcasts (via RSS feeds)
- Email newsletters for students and teachers
- English for Mandarin Speakers
- DARS projects (Persian, Arabic)

== Brief history ==
The department was established in 1943. Since then, it has changed names multiple times, appearing as "English by Radio" (or ExR), "English by Radio and Television" and "BBC English", before arriving at "BBC Learning English". BBC World Service began broadcasting English language teaching programmes in 1943 for beginners, intermediate and advanced learners, for adult and children. There were number of series for teaching language comprehension with a help of song lyrics, such as Pop Words. It was usual for the major broadcasters in the 1950s to have a programme teaching the language of the country the broadcaster served.

In August 2007, BBC Learning English announced a partnership with Xinjiang's Tianshannet.
