= 2014 Kunming attack =

Knife attack at Kunming Railway Station in Kunming, Yunnan, China

- Part of the Xinjiang conflict
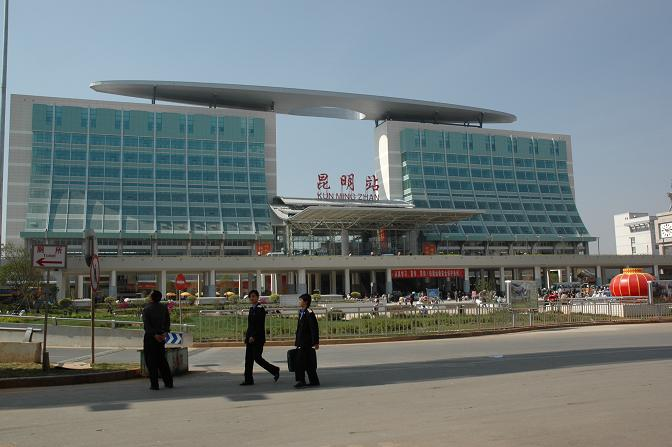
- A view of Kunming Railway Station
- Native name: 3·01严重暴力恐怖事件
- Location: 25°1′3″N 102°43′15″E; Kunming, Yunnan
- Date: 1 March 2014; 12 years ago 21:12 – c. 21:24 (China Standard Time)
- Target: Passengers of Kunming railway station
- Attack type: Mass stabbing
- Weapons: Knives and cleavers
- Deaths: 35 (including four perpetrators)
- Injuries: 143
- Perpetrator: Xinjiang separatists
- No. of participants: 8
- Motive: Islamic extremism Terrorism
- Convicted: 4

On 1 March 2014, a group of five knife-wielding terrorists attacked passengers in the Kunming Railway Station in Kunming, Yunnan, China, killing 31 people, and wounding 143 others. The attackers pulled out long-bladed knives and stabbed and slashed passengers at random. Four assailants were shot to death by police on the spot and one injured perpetrator was arrested. Police announced on 3 March that the six-man, two-woman group had been neutralized, after the arrest of three remaining suspects.

No group claimed responsibility for the attack and no ties to any organization have been identified; in effect the group was a singular terror cell. Xinhua News Agency and the government of Kunming said that the attack had been linked to Sunni extremists which were a faction of Xinjiang separatists. Police said that they had confiscated a black, hand-painted East Turkestan flag at the scene, which is associated with the Uyghur separatists from the Xinjiang Uyghur Autonomous Region.

== Attack ==
At 21:12 on 1 March 2014, a group of five individuals, all dressed in black clothes and armed with knives and cleavers, rushed into a waiting area of Kunming railway station, attacking people indiscriminately. From their starting point, the group moved separately through the station square, the second ticket area, the ticket main hall, and the small baggage storage area. Witnesses described two of the attackers, who lingered at the ticket counters as a man and a woman, both around 30 years old and 170 cm in height, the former slightly overweight with medium hair and the latter wearing a headscarf.

Several people hid in various businesses at the station, which were protected by roller shutters. A post office with five security guards first sheltered 40 people, with the number growing to nearly a hundred by the time the attack was resolved. Chen Fang stated that nearly 200 people were hiding inside her 80 m^{2} (860 sq ft) restaurant for an hour, with many having to stand on tables, chairs, and the kitchen's stoves. Several dozen people shared a hiding spot in the restroom.

Xie Lin, a captain of the Kunming Railway Police Station, overheard the commotion from the initial attack and called in an apparent group fight after seeing several injured on the floor. While Xie guided passengers and staff members out, deputy station director Zhang Liyuan arrived in the waiting area, where he confronted one attacker, whom he kept at bay until Xie returned with three other officers, fellow railway policeman Peng Bin, and traffic police Yu Meng and Li Rui. Like Zhang, they were armed only with batons. As the five officers restrained the first attacker, two more armed persons came up behind them. The officers attempted to push back the attackers to the empty parking lot outside, with Zhang shouting "Come here, go chase me, come cut me!" ("来来，来追我，来砍我！"). The trio, two men and one woman, eventually ran off further into the station, with the three railway officers chasing after them.

When a security guard ran at the frontmost attacker, Zhang reached for the one in front of him, but this attacker turned around and slashed his left hand, severing his index finger and the top of his thumb. Zhang's attacker joined the second in injuring the intervening security guard before stabbing the other two police officers, Xie in the head and Peng in the abdomen. At 21:19, the three attackers escaped through the bus depot onto Zhanqian Road. Though heavily wounded, the three officers remained in pursuit, being joined by arriving police and passersby. The attack lasted around twelve minutes.

According to China Central Television, a four-man SWAT team from the Guandu branch of Kunming Municipal Public Security Bureau was on site within ten minutes of the start of the knife attack. At around 21:35, all five attackers were surrounded at the intersection of Beijing Road and Yongping Road. Police initially attempted to subdue the attackers using tear-gas shells but were unable to do so. The sole member of the team with an automatic weapon shot five of the attackers in rapid succession, killing four of them, after two warning shots were fired. A wounded female suspect was detained at the scene and sent to a hospital.

=== Initial response ===
Initial reports had incorrectly indicated ten assailants. China News Service quoted a "Mr. Tan", who remembered seven to eight attackers indiscriminately slashing people regardless of age, even stabbing the wounded on the floor until they were dead. He also saw a police officer carrying a child of about five years of age, with slashed trousers and blood streaming down their legs. Traveller Zuo Ruoxing, who was travelling with his friend Pan Huabing, also recalled seven or eight men, with one attempting to stab Pan's daughter, though the girl's father ended up taking the fatal injury to the throat.

After the incident, all trains originally scheduled to stop at Kunming Station were directed to stop elsewhere until 23:00 on 1 March when services gradually resumed.

Personnel at the Changshui International Airport also held an emergency meeting and tightened security though they stated that they were operating normally. There were scattered news reports suggesting that similar attacks occurred in Dashuying (大树营) in the Jinma subdistrict of Kunming, but local police stated that reports of "several places suffering attacks" were only rumors.

== Casualties ==
The assailants killed 31 people and injured 143 (including seven policemen). Two security guards, identified by their surnames Liu and Ding, were killed while attempting to subdue the perpetrators. The wounded were transported in public buses and treated at 11 hospitals in Kunming.

== Aftermath ==
The Red Cross Society of China sent a team to Yunnan in the morning of 2 March to support the Yunnan Red Cross Society in assisting with rescue efforts and to provide counseling to the relatives of victims and shocked civilians.

On 2 March, armed police patrolled the area around Kunming Railway Station. In the early morning, locals put flowers on the square in front of the station to mourn the dead. At 13:00, the Kunming Police disclosed information on two suspects, one woman and one man, according to statements of witnesses.

In the aftermath of the attack, heavy police presence was noted in Dashuying, a low-income ghetto that houses many of Kunming's Uyghurs, and local residents were questioned by police.

Yunnan's Communist Party Secretary Qin Guangrong said on 4 March that he had allocated sufficient resources to help the victims, who would not have to bear medical costs. Emergency services had processed the injured, and compensation arrangements were being discussed. Qin said that the absence of a clear threat up to that point meant terrorism prevention had not been a high priority in Yunnan. He admitted to inadequacies in resources, policing and intelligence gathering.

== Investigation ==
On 3 March the Ministry of Public Security announced that police had arrested three suspects and said that an eight-person terrorist group was responsible for the attack, with five direct perpetrators and three others involved only in plotting.

The attackers were named as Abdurehim Kurban, (Note: Abdul Rehim Kurban: Uyghur: ئابدۇرېھىم قۇربان, romanized: Abdurëhim Qurban; Chinese: 阿卜杜热伊木·库尔班; pinyin: Ābùdūrèyīmù·Kù'ěrbān) Ahmat Abiti, (Note: 艾合买提·阿比提) Mangshar Shartar, (Note: 盲沙尔·沙塔尔) Almira Tursun, (Note: 阿尔米亚·吐尔逊) and Patigul Tohti. (Note: 帕提古丽·托合提) Kurban was identified as the leader of the group, while Tohti, pregnant at the time of the attack, was the sole surviving member. Voice of America, a news network owned by the United States government, claimed that there had been scant information from official sources as to the identities, or even evidence that the attackers were Uyghurs.

Qin Guangrong said that the captured wounded suspect had confessed to the crime. He asserted the group, composed of thirteen people, was founded in December 2013, with the goal of participating in jihad abroad. It's alleged that they consumed material on making explosives and trained themselves to engage in terrorist acts, planning to cooperate with foreign terror groups as well. The group had moved frequently through southern China, including Guangzhou, Zhuhai, Nanyang, and Lanzhou, being last headquartered at a barber shop in Shadian District, Gejiu, Yunnan. After two failed attempts to cross the Chinese border on 24 and 26 February 2014, which resulted in the arrest of three of their members, the group decided to carry out an attack on the railway station of either Geiju or Kunming, purchasing over ten bladed weapons in advance. According to authorities, the group of five attackers departed Shadian in a rented car at 17:30, arriving at Kunming's railway station three hours later.

Anonymous sources from Radio Free Asia, another broadcaster that is under the supervision of the U.S. government, seem to confirm that they were Uyghurs, saying the gang most likely originated from a township in Hotan, Xinjiang, where it was claimed that police had violently suppressed a demonstration against the closure of a mosque and the arrest of its imam in June 2013 that ended in 15 dead and 50 injured. The sources claimed that after witnessing the capture of fellow Uyghurs attempting to flee China into Laos, the group became desperate because of their lack of identity papers along with being on the run from police.

The three people accused of masterminding the attack, Iskandar Ehet, Turgun Tohtunyaz and Hasayn Muhammad, had been arrested on 27 Feb in Shadian, Honghe Prefecture, Yunnan, while attempting to illegally cross the border. The surviving assailant suspect, Patigul Tohti, a pregnant woman, and the three men were tried for and convicted of murder and organizing and leading a terrorist organization in the Kunming City Intermediate People's Court. Tohti was sentenced to life in prison, while Ehet, Tohtunyaz, and Muhammad received death sentences, and were executed on 24 March 2015. Five others, Yimin Mulla, Yusufu Yasen, Balati Abdusaimaiti, Ali Yimin, and Salam Mamut, were also tried as part of the group in separate proceedings.

== Reactions ==
=== Domestic ===
After the terrorist attack, Chinese Communist Party (CCP) general secretary Xi Jinping and Premier Li Keqiang assigned Meng Jianzhu, Secretary of the Central Politics and Law Commission, to oversee the investigation. There was some coverage in the regional press; local Kunming Times carried the story on its front page. But the South China Morning Post (SCMP) remarked that the China Central Television evening news programme as well as other national media did not report the attack. Coverage was also scant in the Southern Metropolis Daily in Guangzhou and the Yangtse Evening Post.

As a result, it became a heavily discussed topic on Chinese social media, where responses ranged from anger and shock to restraint. Whilst China Daily noted the appeals by netizens to "stop circulating bloody pictures", microblogged and social media-hosted images of the carnage were swiftly deleted by censors. Several Sina Weibo users also referred to the incident as our "9-11"; and the CCP-owned tabloid Global Times echoed the sentiment with a headline titled, "Nothing justified civilian slaughter in China's '9-11'". Jin Canrong of Renmin University suggested the way forward would be to de-emphasise Uyghur ethnicity and try to instill a greater sense of "Chineseness", stressing equal obligations and rights as Chinese citizens, while Barry Sautman, a China expert at the Hong Kong University of Science and Technology, suggested widening the preferential policies and granting Xinjiang Uyghurs greater autonomy.

The SCMP suggested the attack had taken place at the most politically sensitive time of year, which was on the eve of the second session of the National Committee of the Chinese People's Political Consultative Conference. Lü Xinhua, spokesman for the conference, denounced the attack as a serious violent terrorist attack planned and organized by terrorist elements from Xinjiang. This assertion has been echoed by officials in Kunming.

A Legal Daily video clip that broadcast on CCTV News on 3 March featured an interview with the SWAT marksman who was responsible for shooting five of the attackers and applauded his heroism. The officer said that as the assailants rushed towards him ignoring warning shots fired, he shot the five in about 15 seconds "without thinking". Sautman said that the government may have wanted to "show that there was also successful resistance to terrorists and to put a human face on that resistance."

==== Western media coverage ====
Following the event, many major Western media outlets covered the event with quotation marks around the word "terrorism," some in the article's headline, some in the body, and some in both. China accused Western commentators of hypocrisy and double standards on terrorism. Chinese citizens followed that with criticism against the United States government for refusing to identify the attack as a terrorist attack, with some comparing it against the Chinese response to the Boston Marathon bombing.

The People's Daily, the official newspaper of the Central Committee of the Chinese Communist Party, accused Western media of ambivalence and failing to state unequivocally that the attack was an act of terrorism, saying, "These media are always the loudest when it comes to anti-terrorism, but in the Kunming train station terrorist violence they lost their voice and spoke confusedly, making people angry," and named American news outlets CNN, The Associated Press, The New York Times and The Washington Post as examples.

CNN removed the quotation marks on 2 March, one day after the event, describing it as "deadly Kunming terror attacks".

=== International ===
The UN Secretary-General Ban Ki-moon and the Security Council separately condemned the attack. Many countries condemned the attack, and expressed their deepest sympathy and condolences. Dilxat Rexit, a spokesman for the World Uyghur Congress, deplored the attacks, and urged the Chinese government to "ease systematic repression". The Diplomat pointed to use of the comparison to 9–11 as referring not so much to the scale of the attack but the effect that this would have on the nation's psyche, saying "there are hints that it may have a similar effect on the way China conceptualizes and deals with terrorism". An academic at the National University of Singapore warned of a very significant impact of the incident on the Chinese public as the attack took place in the heart of China, and not at the periphery, making the people more inclined to support the adoption of a more hard-line approach towards Xinjiang or Uyghurs, thus accelerating the cycle of repression and violence.

Rebiya Kadeer, President of the World Uyghur Congress, called on the Chinese government to rationally handle the attacks and "not to demonize Uighur people as enemies of the state". The Chinese Foreign Ministry spokesman Qin Gang responded by condemning the WUC as "an anti-China separatist organization", saying that the WUC "cannot represent Uyghur people" and that Kadeer "showed her ulterior political motive by linking the terrorist incidents at Kunming together with a particular ethnic group".

The Daily Telegraph mentioned that this was the first time Uyghurs had been blamed for carrying out an attack of such magnitude outside of Xinjiang. Adjunct professor of Sinology at the Chinese University of Hong Kong Willy Lam said that official figures indicate violent conflicts appear to be on the increase. He suggested the absence of a mechanism for airing grievances and dialogue between the aggrieved and the authorities is contributing to the increase in those resorting to violence. The Analects column of The Economist asserted that although the alleged group leader's name suggests he may be a Uyghur, this would be difficult to verify in a country where media are state-controlled and officials tightly control information flows. It responded to Chinese commentators who criticised outsiders for not immediately accepting official Chinese assertion of an act of politically motivated terrorism by Xinjiang separatists by saying: "But China, which prefers to play down the role of its policies in Xinjiang in generating discontent, has long sought to discredit its Uygur critics by linking them to terrorism". The Economist also mentioned "Chinese oppression in Xinjiang" that "hit at the heart of Uighur identity" as a factor in the escalating violence, including: "students are banned from fasting during Ramadan, religious teaching for children is restricted, and Uighur-language education is limited". Yet according to Dawn, China only discourages fasting for Uygur Muslims and encourages people to eat properly for study and work but authorities "don't force anyone to eat during Ramadan". Rohan Gunaratna, a terrorism expert at Nanyang Technological University, Singapore, said there had been intelligence failure. He estimated that "in the last 12 months there have been over 200 attacks [in Xinjiang], maybe even more. It is getting worse".

== Aftermath ==
The family members of 3 of the killed security personnel each received 690,000 renminbi in compensation. For the safety of their families, the identities of 15 victims who attempted to prevent the terrorist attack were anonymized.

=== Effects on Chinese police ===
The 2014 Kunming attack was cited by Shanghai police as one of the main reasons that police in Shanghai were allowed to patrol with personal firearms.

== See also ==
- List of massacres in China
- List of mass stabbings by death toll
