= May 2014 Ürümqi attack =

Terrorist bombing in Xinjiang, China

- Part of Xinjiang Conflict
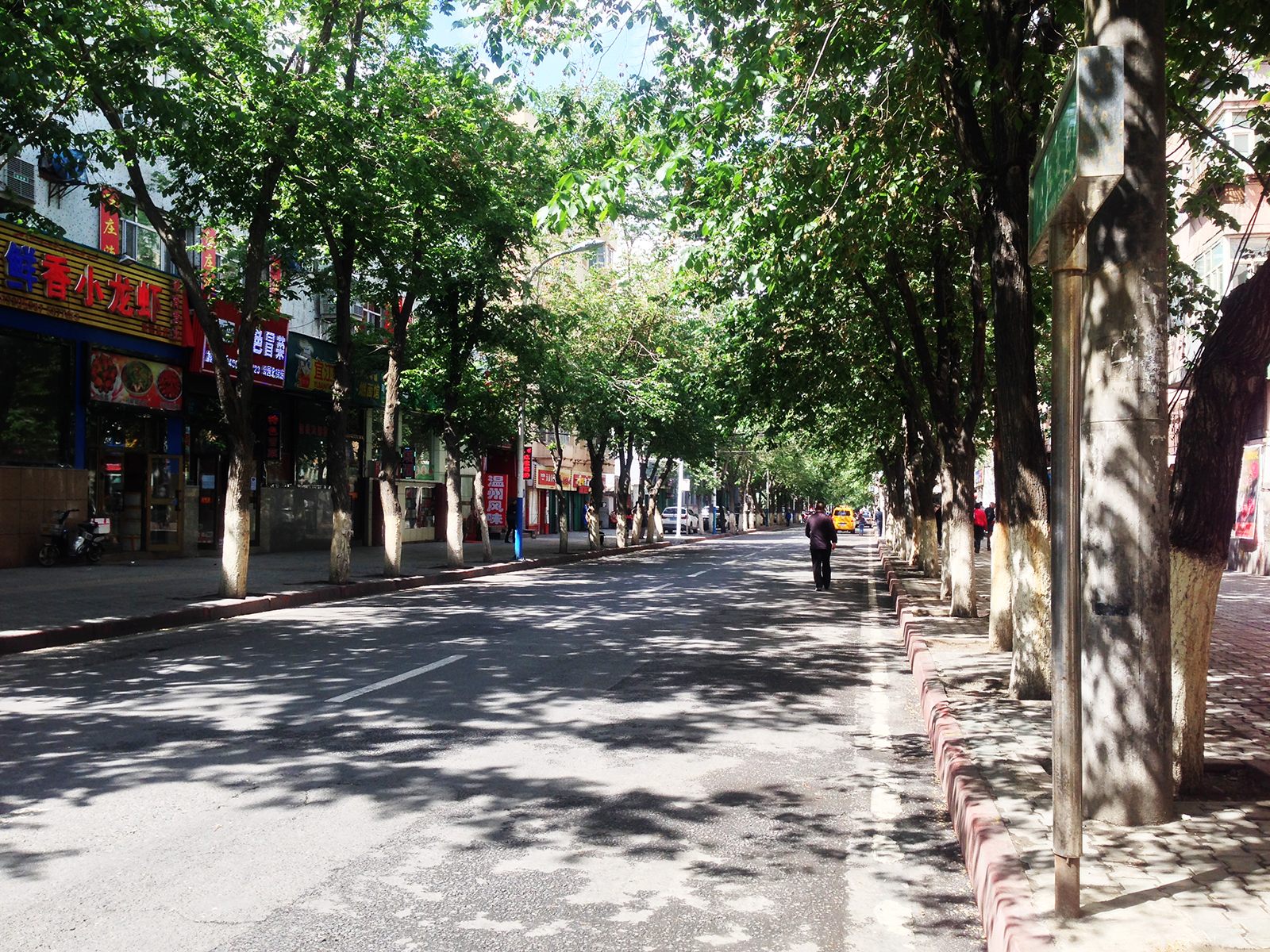
- Location: 43°47′37″N 87°35′49″E; Gongyuan Street, Ürümqi, Xinjiang, China
- Date: 22 May 2014; 7:50 am (China Standard Time)
- Attack type: Suicide bombing Vehicular homicide
- Weapons: SUVs, IED, car bomb
- Deaths: 43 (including 4 attackers)
- Injuries: 90+
- Perpetrators: 5

On the morning of 22 May 2014, two sport utility vehicles (SUVs) carrying five assailants were driven into a busy street market in Ürümqi, the capital of China's Xinjiang Uyghur Autonomous Region. Up to a dozen explosives were thrown at shoppers from the windows of the SUVs. The SUVs crashed into shoppers, then collided with each other and exploded. Forty-three people were killed, including four of the assailants; more than 90 were wounded, making this the deadliest attack of the Xinjiang conflict. The event was designated as a terrorist attack.

== Background ==
The Xinjiang region had witnessed increasing violence by separatist militants in the period leading up the May bombings. On 30 April 2014, two suicide bombings killed three and injured 79, leaving a level of high security in the region and the train station where the attack occurred "like a fortress", with men bearing arms at ticket gates, multiple police trucks in the city, and checkpoints. The Turkistan Islamic Party claimed responsibility for the April bombings.

== Attack ==
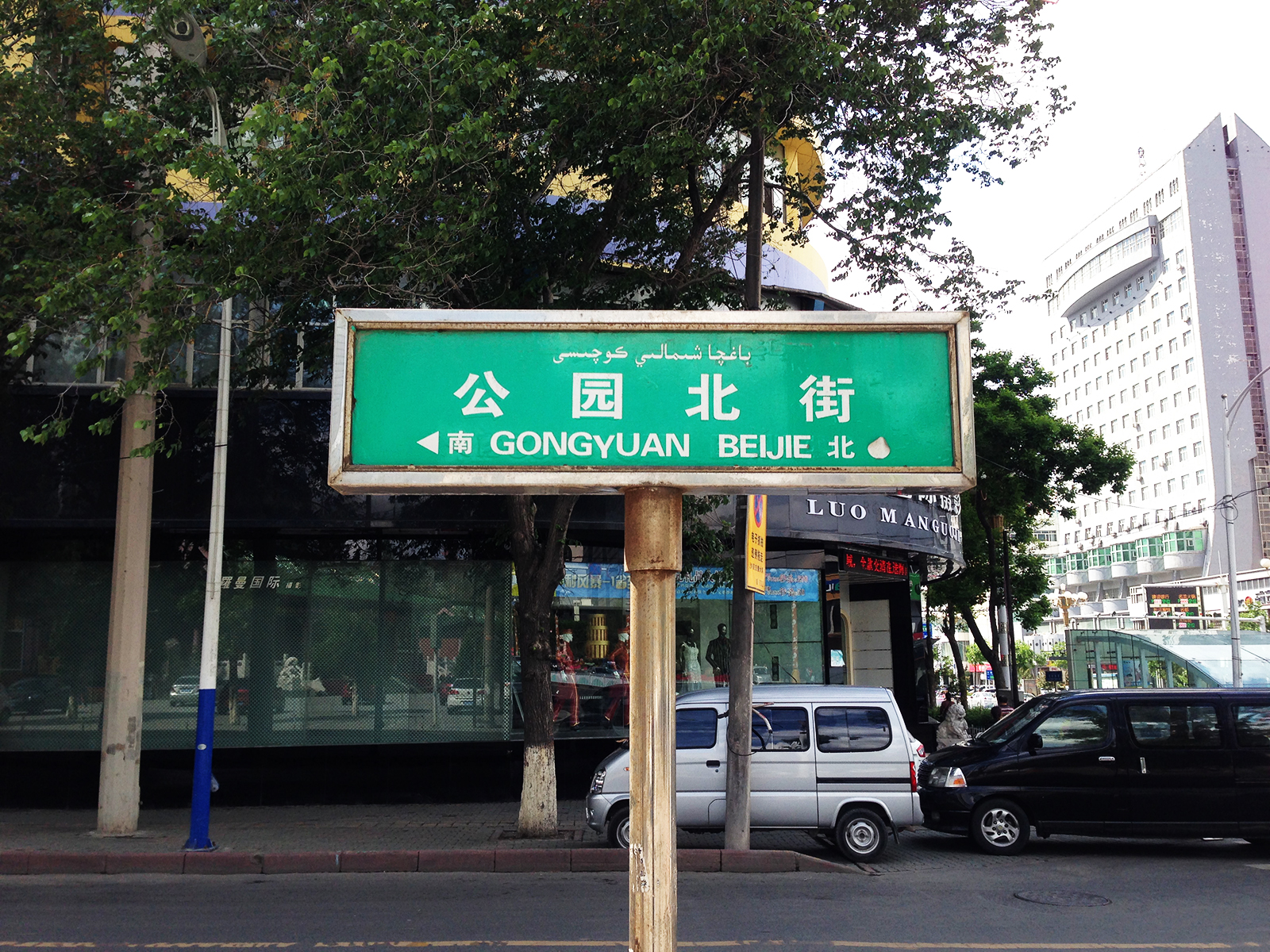
Gongyuan Street (the location of the attack)

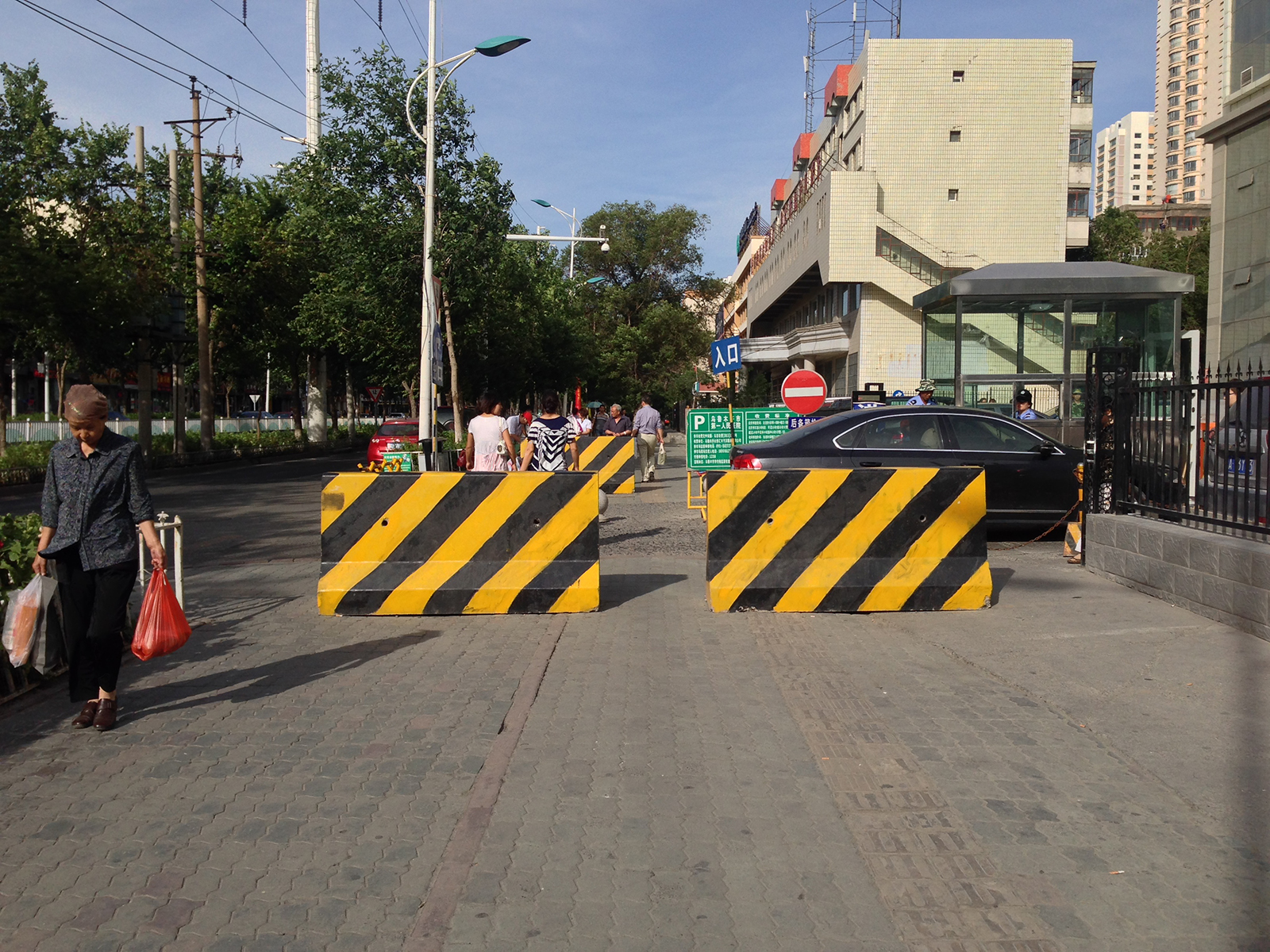
After the market blasts, Ürümqi entered a state of enhanced security with concrete barricades being set up at the entrance of every school, university, residential area, avenue, and vital junction in order to defend against similar ramming attacks by vehicles. This image shows many concrete barricades on Henan East Road, New Downtown, Ürümqi.

The attackers struck a morning market on North Gongyuan (Park) Street beside People's Park in Saybagh District of central Ürümqi. It is a busy market serving neighbourhood residents, frequented especially by the elderly. According to residents, most customers of the market are Han Chinese, though many vendors are Uyghur.

At 7:50 am CST (although China only has one official time zone, Ürümqi has an unofficial time zone two hours behind Chinese Standard Time, making the time 5:50 am local time), at a time when few people were about due to the early hour, two SUVs without license plates, but flying flags with Uyghur writing, travelling southward, were driven through metal barriers into an area with shoppers. The drivers of the SUVs ran people down while up to a dozen explosives were thrown out the vehicles' windows. The vehicles then had a head-on collision, resulting in a large explosion "with flames shooting as high as a one-story building". A cordon was set up to keep onlookers back, but pictures depicting a large black smoke cloud were posted on Weibo, and images showed destroyed market stalls and bodies lying on the ground. Within ten minutes, the injured began to be transported to hospitals. Police and emergency-service vehicles arrived in the following 30 minutes. Within a few hours, paramilitary police were patrolling the area, and photographers and videographers were forced to delete images and barred from taking new ones.

A day later, Chinese state media reported that the attack was perpetrated by five suicide bombers. Forty-three people were killed, including four of the assailants, and more than 90 were wounded. The fifth suspect was arrested. Most of the victims were Han Chinese, including many elderly shoppers.

== Response ==
Chinese Communist Party General Secretary Xi Jinping and Premier Li Keqiang responded to the incident by promising "decisive actions against terrorist attacks", and stated that a "strike-first" strategy would be implemented. They also called on government officials in the region to do everything they could to ensure that the injured were assisted, the crime investigated and the perpetrators punished severely.
