= June 2013 Shanshan riots =

2013 Islamist riots in Shanshan County, Xinjiang, China

- Part of the Xinjiang conflict
- Location: Shanshan, Xinjiang Autonomous Region, China
- Date: 26 June 2013; 6:00 a.m. CST
- Attack type: Knife attack
- Deaths: 35 in total 11 rioters 22 civilians 2 police officers
- Injuries: 21
- Motive: Islamic extremism (Note: Claimed by China)

On 26 June 2013, rioting broke out in Shanshan County, in the autonomous region of Xinjiang, China. 35 people died in the riots, including 22 civilians, two police officers and eleven attackers.

== Background ==
Two months before the attack, ethnic clashes occurred in Marelbeshi (Bachu), Xinjiang, China. The violence left at least 21 people dead, including 15 police and local officials.

== Attack ==
On 26 June 2013, terrorists in Lukqun Township, Shanshan County in Xinjiang attacked a police station and a local government building, killing two policemen and 22 civilians. Eleven of the attackers were also killed. This attack was one of the bloodiest attacks in Xinjiang since 2009.

== Aftermath ==
Following the riots, domestic-security chief, Meng Jianzhu, and head of minority affairs, Yu Zhengsheng, were dispatched to the region. Security forces also conducted military parades in the region in a show of force.

== Reactions ==
In response to the riots, Chinese media blamed violence in its own Xinjiang province in June 2013 on extremists from Syria. The Global Times reported that members of an East Turkestan faction had traveled from Turkey to Syria. "This Global Times reporter has recently exclusively learned from the Chinese anti-terrorism authorities that since 2012, some members of the 'East Turkestan' faction have entered Syria from Turkey, participated in extremist, religious and terrorist organisations within the Syrian opposition forces and fought against the Syrian army. At the same time, these elements from 'East Turkestan' have identified candidates to sneak into Chinese territory to plan and execute terrorist attacks." It also cited the arrest of 23-year-old Maimaiti Aili, of the East Turkestan Islamic Movement (ETIM), and said that he fought in the Syrian civil war. Dilxat Raxit, the Sweden-based spokesman for the World Uyghur Congress, replied to the accusation that "Uighurs already find it very difficult to get passports, how can they run off to Syria?" While the Foreign Ministry spokeswoman Hua Chunying did not directly respond to the claims she said that China has "also noted that in recent years East Turkestan terrorist forces and international terrorist organizations have been uniting, not only threatening China's national security but also the peace and stability of relevant countries and regions."

In Turfan's town of Lukchun the attack on 26 June 2013 was congratulated by the Turkistan Islamic Party who called the attackers "mujahideen" in the "Islamic Turkistan" magazine in its 14th edition.

== See also ==
- List of massacres in China
