= Terrorism in China =

Terrorism in the People's Republic of China encompasses the employment of violence or threats thereof to instigate political or ideological shifts within the country. The Chinese government identifies terrorism as one of the "Three Evils," alongside separatism and religious extremism, viewing these as interconnected threats to national security and social stability. These forces are seen by Beijing as interconnected threats to social stability and national security. In particular, terrorism is viewed as a violent manifestation of ethnic separatism, and separatism is understood as a corollary of religious zealotry. The government has embarked on strike-hard campaigns to suppress these tendencies, particularly in the Muslim majority Xinjiang and the Buddhist Tibetan provinces.

Following the 9/11 attacks in 2001, the PRC strengthened its involvement in multilateral and bilateral counterterrorism efforts. As a result, several Uyghur separatist movements have been labelled as terrorist groups by the United Nations and the U.S. Department of State. There have been allegations that the Chinese government has been applying charges of terrorism in an inconsistent and politically motivated manner. These represent one of the contributing factors that play into the existing tensions between the Chinese Communist Party and the Uyghur minority.

On 23 January 2024, the Information Office of the State Council released a white paper on "China's Counter-Terrorism Legal System and Practice," which emphasized that China is a victim of terrorism and continues to face it as a threat. Subsequently, on the 24th of January, the People's Daily published an opinion piece demanding that anti-terrorism work must be carried out under the established legal systems.

== Chinese cultural context ==
While there is no international or legally binding definition of terrorism, internationally recognized organizations such as the UN and the EU have defined terrorism in various resolutions. In the cultural setting of China, the term is relatively new and ambiguous.

The concept of terrorism, as it evolved and is understood in the West, did not exist in Imperial China. There, political crime took the form of violence against the emperor, and was viewed as harmful as it induced fear and led to "chaos". With the exception of "good" political violence against rulers whose lack of propriety and virtue resulted in loss of the Mandate of heaven, violence was seen as contrary to human nature and the Tao. Kam Wong argues that the dynamics of imperial China form the basis for contemporary Chinese understandings of terrorism.

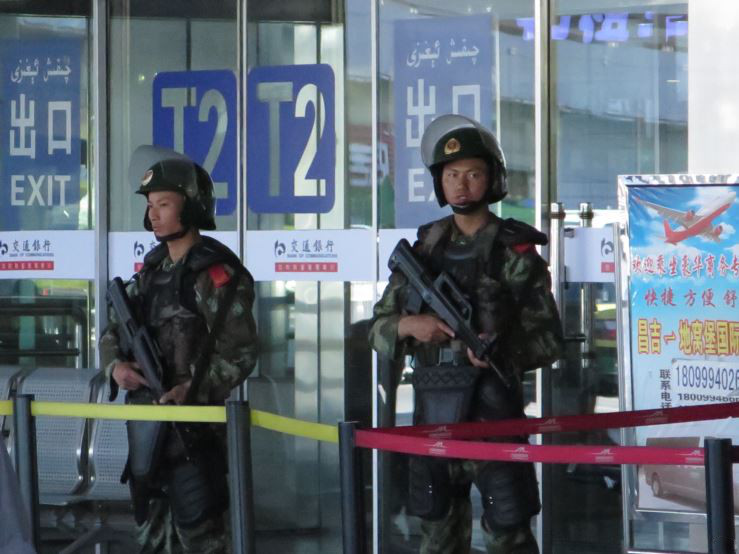
Soldiers guard the entrance to the scene of the May 2014 Urumqi attack

Fear of chaos and social disorder are powerful factors in mobilizing political will to combat potential threats. In the modern context, any group or force with the potential to challenge the existing social order or the political security of the rulers may be considered a form of terrorism. It is "to be condemned unrelentingly and suppressed at all costs," according to Wong.

There is currently no clearly established definition for terrorism either nationally or internationally, though the National People's Congress is in the process of drafting legislation that would clarify the use of the term in Chinese law. The draft legislation, as reported by Xinhua News Agency, classified as terrorist acts that "cause or aim to cause severe harm to society by causing casualties, bringing about major economic losses, damaging public facilities or disturbing social order." Human rights groups charge that the term is sometimes applied to non-violent dissidents in China.

== Regionally focused terrorism and political violence ==
=== Xinjiang ===
Xinjiang, literally "new frontier," is a provincial-level autonomous region situated in the northwest of the People's Republic of China.

Media reports and scholarly studies of terrorism in contemporary China frequently focus on members of the largely Muslim Uyghur ethnic group, who are concentrated in the northwestern province of Xinjiang.

Throughout its history, the region now known as Xinjiang was ruled intermittently by China. The Turkic Uyghurs generally identify more closely with the cultures of Central Asia and have historically resisted attempts at assimilation into Han Chinese culture.

From 1933 to 1934, Uyghurs founded a short-lived Islamic republic, and the Soviets supported Communist Uyghur rebels in the Ili Rebellion from 1944 to 1949 against the Republic of China and the Second East Turkestan Republic, before the Incorporation of Xinjiang into the People's Republic of China in 1949. After the Sino-Soviet split, the Soviet Union amassed troops on the Russian border with Xinjiang. They also bolstered "East Turkestan" separatist movements, which received moral and material support from other regional militant groups. China accused the Soviets of engineering riots, and improved the military infrastructure there to combat it.

In the 1980s, Chinese authorities relaxed some of their restrictive policies against ethnic minorities, and loosened border controls which allowed Uyghurs to travel to the Mecca Pilgrimage. During this period, some Uyghurs came into contact with radical Islamist groups operating in Central Asia and Afghanistan, while others studied in Quranic schools associated with Islamist movements. The increase in fundamentalism has been linked to the Islamic revival of the 1980s, following Deng Xiaoping's political reforms which sought to reduce the suppression of religion by promoting atheism, which was widespread during Mao's rule. Rémi Castets has commented that this led to a "more militant logic using Islam as an instrument for distinguishing Uyghur values from the non-clerical and atheistic values promoted by the Chinese authorities." Following the fall of the Soviet Union and the independence of the former Soviet republics in Central Asia, the Chinese government feared a resurgence of separatist movements, as well as the spread of radical Islam in the region, which could destabilize its infrastructure in Xinjiang. During this time, countries such as Kazakhstan and Kyrgyzstan offered asylum to Uyghur refugees, and recognition to groups pursuing independence. To combat this, the Beijing government settled border disputes and offered economic co-operation with the Central Asian republics through the Shanghai Co-operation Organization, and successfully persuaded these countries to ban Uyghur separatist groups residing there, as well as to extradite suspected Uyghur separatist refugees.

A chain of aggressive and belligerent press releases in the 1990s making false claims about violent insurrections in Xinjiang and exaggerating both the number of Chinese migrants and the total number of Uyghurs in Xinjiang was made by the Soviet-supported URFET leader Yusupbek Mukhlisi.

There is no single "Uyghur agenda," and grievances of Uyghurs against the Chinese government are generally political in nature. While some Uyghurs desire an independent state in line with Turkic ethnic groups of Central Asia, others desire an autonomous relation with China while retaining their distinct culture, whereas others desire extensive integration with the Chinese political system.

The desire for independence or greater political and cultural autonomy largely stems from resentment over perceived restrictions to religious and cultural expression, ethnic conflict with the local Han Chinese population, income inequality, and the perception that Beijing's government is misallocating Xinjiang's natural resource wealth. Some groups have adopted violent tactics in pursuit of these goals, mostly the establishment of a separate Uyghur state called East Turkistan or Uyghuristan, which lays claim to a large part of China. Entities identified in Chinese government documents as having involvement in violent attacks include the East Turkistan Islamic Movement (ETIM), East Turkistan Liberation Organization (ETLO), United Revolutionary Front of East Turkestan (URFET), and the Uyghur Liberation Organization (ULO). Members of these groups are believed to have received training in Central or South Asian nations such as Afghanistan and Pakistan. Such violent groups have been noted as frequently splintering, merging, and collapsing, which makes claims difficult to substantiate. China's Muslim Hui people, who are comparatively well integrated into Chinese society, regard some Uyghurs as "unpatriotic separatists who give other Chinese Muslims a bad name," according to The New York Times.

Scholars have indicated that violence in Xinjiang is based on an assortment of ideologies, and there is no single dominant ideology among the Uyghurs. As James A. Millward wrote, incidents have "been discontinuous and characterized by a variety of ideologies, Islam being only one of them." Islam, Pan-Turkic nationalism, and Uyghur nationalism are all factors in unrest in the Xinjiang region. There are six incidents in China from 1990 to 2005, according to Ogden, that meet the strictest definition of terrorism, meaning the use of "random" violence against innocent civilians to cause terror, and excluding calculated violence against the state to advance a secessionist movement. Among the events identified by Ogden was an incident on 5 February 1992 when Uyghur separatists (possibly belonging to the East Turkestan Islamic Party) detonated bombs on two public buses and in two buildings in Urumqi and a bomb attack on a hotel in Kashgar on 17 June 1992. Instances of violence by ethnic Uyghurs against security forces, organs, or infrastructure of the state are far more common, but are distinguished by scholars from terrorism aimed against the civilian population. According to Martin, Chinese authorities frequently classify any act of violence or separatist activity in Xinjiang as a manifestation of terrorism, while comparable acts by ethnic Han Chinese are not be classified in this manner.

On 28 October 2013, five Uyghurs drove a jeep into Beijing's Tiananmen Square, set the gas tank on fire, killing two civilians and injuring more than forty bystanders. These Uyghurs had jihadist flags and there was evidence of their ties to ETIM.

On 2 March 2014, eight Uyghurs armed with knives attacked civilians in a train station in southern China, killing 33 people and injuring 143.

On 27 May 2014 a rare mass trial was held at a packed sports stadium in Xinjiang where three people were sentenced to death and another 53 received lengthy jail terms after being convicted of terrorism charges. 39 people had been sentenced at a similar gathering the previous week. An anti-terror campaign which began in 2013 and continued into 2014 preceded the sentencing trials. The campaign included attacks on railway stations and a market in Xinjiang in which seventy people were killed and several hundred wounded.

TIP (ETIM) sent the "Turkistan Brigade" (Arabic: كتيبة تركستاني, Katibat Turkistani) to take part in the Syrian Civil War, most noticeably in the 2015 Jisr al-Shughur offensive. The leader of TIP (ETIM) in Syria is Abu Rida al-Turkestani (أبو رضا التركستاني).

There have been no terrorist attacks in Xinjiang since 2017 following the Chinese government's responses against it such as mass surveillance, increased arrests, and a system of re-education camps, estimated to hold a million Uyghurs and members of other Muslim minority ethnic groups.

=== Tibet ===
The Tibetan Autonomous Region, highlighted in red, is home to approximately half of the country's ethnic Tibetan population.

Tibet, the homeland of 6.5 million Tibetans, about half of whom live in the Tibetan Autonomous Region ("Tibet") and slightly more in the neighbouring provinces of Qinghai, Yunnan, Gansu and Sichuan, lies for the most part within the People's Republic of China. For centuries, Tibet resisted Chinese influence and control, with varying effectiveness. During periods when China was dominant, little more was involved than a Chinese governor and a garrison in Lhasa and Chinese administration in border areas such as Amdo and Kham with mixed populations of Tibetans and Chinese; no attempt was made by the Chinese to displace the Tibetan aristocracy or political and religious institutions of Tibet. From 1912 until 1950, Tibet experienced a period of de facto independence from Chinese rule, following the fall of the Qing dynasty. However, in 1950, the Chinese annexed Tibet and its outlying areas, occupied it, displaced Tibetan political and religious institutions, and assumed governance of the nation. Tibetan resistance since 1950 has taken a variety of forms, including instances of armed resistance that have been described as terrorism by Chinese authorities.

Discontent surrounding the Chinese-implemented land reforms and assimilation policies in Tibetan areas led to revolts and intermittent warfare, although the Chinese central government took care to delay or lengthen the implementation of certain programs in comparison to the rest of the nation. Some Tibetan paramilitary groups during the period, such as Chushi Gangdruk, received covert material and training support from the Central Intelligence Agency and the Taiwan-based Kuomintang government. The resistance culminated in the 1959 Tibetan Rebellion. The uprising was suppressed by Chinese forces, leading to the flight of the 14th Dalai Lama and some 100,000 other Tibetans to India.

In the aftermath of the revolt, Chinese authorities imposed radical social reforms and further restrictions on religious freedom. The Great Leap Forward and Cultural Revolution further intensified Tibetan resentment against Chinese rule and strengthened group identification. By 1980, Deng Xiaoping's ascension to leadership and the implementation of the reform and opening up program led to the reform of earlier repressive policies against ethnic minorities, and granted nominal political autonomy to Tibet. While the Chinese government has invested considerably in the development of the Tibetan economy, education system and infrastructure, the continuing restrictions on religious expression and political participation resulted in resentment amongst the Tibetan populace, leading to the 1987–1989 Tibetan unrest. The unrest prompted Chinese authorities to focus more on the economic, educational, and infrastructural development of the region, intensify efforts to undermine the religious and political influence of the Dalai Lama, and encourage ethnic Han migration to the region.

Ogden notes that many Tibetans desire greater cultural and political autonomy, if not full independence. Outbreaks of violent clashes with authorities in the region occur only intermittently, such as in the 2008 Lhasa violence. Ogden credits the low incidence of conventional terrorism in Tibet to an undereducated population, swift and harsh responses to terrorism by the Chinese state, and the pacific influence of Buddhism. Nonetheless, there are segments of the Tibetan and Tibetan diasporic population who reject the leadership of the Dalai Lama and view violent opposition as the only viable route towards independence. Notable instances of violence against civilians include a series of attacks in 1996 in the Tibetan capital of Lhasa, and a bombing in a public square in the city of Chengdu in April 2002, which Chinese authorities allege were carried out by Tibetan separatists. Chinese authorities adopt a broad definition of terrorism with respect to Tibet, and have labelled a variety of protests and expressions of opposition as terrorism. In 2012, for instance, authorities referred to the Dalai Lama's prayer sessions for Tibetan self-immolators as "terrorism in disguise." Authorities have also ascribed terrorist motives to Tibetan exiles who call for independence, and to Tibetan monks who travel to India without government authorization.

== Terrorism in contemporary China ==
=== Legal definition and use ===
Under China's criminal law, acts of terrorism can carry a prison sentence of up to ten years. Since 2001, over 7,000 Chinese citizens have been convicted on terrorism charges. However, the law does not clearly define what constitutes a terrorist group or activity. In October 2011, Chinese authorities began crafting a bill that would more clearly define terrorism. According to the state-run Xinhua News Agency, the draft bill defines terrorist acts as those that are intended "induce public fear or to coerce state or international organization's by means of violence, sabotage, threats or other tactics...These acts cause or aim to cause severe harm to society by causing casualties, bringing about major economic losses, damaging public facilities or disturbing social order."

Human rights and international law experts have raised concerns over the implications of the bills in light of the lack of judicial independence in the People's Republic of China. A representative of Human Rights Watch was reported as saying, "strengthening law enforcement powers without appropriate judicial checks and balances is dangerous," and further noted that it was unclear how and by whom groups and individuals would be designated as terrorists.

The government of the People's Republic of China identifies terrorism as one of "Three Evils", alongside separatism and religious fundamentalism. Beijing sees these forces as interconnected threats to social stability and national security. In particular, terrorism is viewed as a violent manifestation of ethnic separatism, and separatism is understood as a corollary of religious zealotry.

=== Entities designated as terrorists threats ===
China's Ministry of Public Security issued a list of what it considers terrorist threats on 15 December 2003. These include the Eastern Turkestan Islamic Movement (ETIM), the East Turkestan Liberation Organization (ETLO), the World Uyghur Congress, and the East Turkistan Information Center. The Ministry further named eleven individuals as terrorists.

The Eastern Turkistan Islamic Movement, whose aim is to establish a fundamentalist Muslim state to be called "East Turkistan" and the conversion of all Chinese people to Islam, operates throughout Central Asia and claimed responsibility for over 200 acts of terrorism from 1990 to 2001, resulting in at least 162 deaths and 440 injuries. Chinese authorities allege the group has a close relationship with al-Qaeda, and that it receives funding and training in Afghanistan. Rémi Castets has said that while "it is possible that these movements, and particularly the ETIM, might have had contacts with the bin Laden network and more probably with the Islamic Movement of Uzbekistan," direct ties are likely minimal because of "bin Laden's silence on East Turkistan." The group was considerably weakened following the American-led invasion of Afghanistan, which saw the death of its leader Hasan Mahsum, as well as Emir Abu Mohammed, who was killed in October 2003 in a raid on an al-Qaeda training camp in Waziristan by Pakistani forces. According to Stratfor, following the death of Mahsum, the group fractured and a successor movement with ties to Central Asian militants was formed in Afghanistan, under the leadership of Abdul Haq al-Turkistani. The reformed ETIM issued several videos, including threats to attack the 2008 Summer Olympics in Beijing, although no such large-scale attacks took place. Haq was allegedly killed by a US drone strike in Afghanistan in March 2010.

ETIM's capabilities and existence as depicted by the Chinese government has raised doubt amongst Uyghur dissident groups; according to Uyghur expert Dru Gladney, the majority of information on ETIM derive from Chinese government sources and lack independent verification, while other analysts noted that the ETIM was "obscure but not unknown" before the 9/11 attacks, having been documented for over 20 years by both Chinese and non-Chinese scholars. Furthermore, Uyghur dissident groups criticized the inclusion of the World Uyghur Congress and the East Turkistan Information Center, claiming that both groups are NGOs based in Germany which mainly serve to report information. Chinese state media published a statement from terrorism scholar Rohan Gunaratna, who claimed that the ETIM had "many sympathizers and supporters" within the WUC.

Out of these groups, the ETIM and ETLO were also designated to be terrorist groups by Kazakhstan, Kyrgyzstan, and the United Nations. The United States refused China's request to designate the ETLO as such in 2003, although the US State Department says the ETLO has engaged in "small politically-motivated bombings and armed attacks".

=== Chronology of major events ===
The following is a partial list of events that have been described as terror attacks or attempted terrorist attacks by non-state actors in China:

Date	Location	Main article	Description
5 February 1992	Urumqi, Xinjiang	5 February 1992 Urumqi Bombings	Two buses exploded in Urumqi, resulting in at least 3 deaths, and 23 injured. Unconfirmed reports indicated the attacks were perpetrated by the East Turkestan Islamic Party. According to government documents, other bombs were discovered and defused in a local cinema and a residential building.
13 January 1996	Lhasa, Tibet		Four major attacks were acknowledged, although unofficial sources reported more. The attacks generally targeted and successfully wounded people, whereas earlier bombings targeted buildings, such an obelisk on the Qinghai-Tibet highway. On 13 January, a Tibetan Buddhist monk exploded a homemade bomb at a shop owned by Han Chinese. Five days later on 18 January, the house of Sengchen Lobsang Gyaltsen, the head lama of the Panchen Lama's Tashilhunpo Monastery, was bombed. Gyaltsen had opposed the 14th Dalai Lama to ordain Gyaincain Norbu in the 11th Panchen Lama controversy. He was out of his house at the time of the explosion, but a person nearby was "seriously injured", according to the South China Morning Post. No group claimed responsibility for the bombings, but China blamed forces loyal to the Dalai Lama. On 18 March, a bomb exploded at the regional government and local Communist Party compound. The government temporarily shut down tourism in Tibet in response. China initially denied all of the blasts, but later attributed them to separatists. The final blast of the year was detonated by remote control at 1:30 am on Christmas Day, in front of the central Lhasa municipal government offices. Five people were injured, including two night watchmen and three shopkeepers. The official Radio Tibet called the blast "an appalling act of terrorism", and the Chinese government offered a $120,000 reward for the perpetrator. Vice Chairman of the Tibet Autonomous Region Gyamco called on residents to "heighten our alertness and strengthen preventive measures".
10 July 1996	China-Pakistan border		United Revolutionary Front of East Turkestan claims to have killed 20 Chinese border guards in an attack on 4 July.
27 February 1997	Urumqi, Xinjiang	Urumqi bus bombs	Bombs detonated on three buses in Urumqi, leaving nine dead and 68 seriously wounded. The Uyghur Liberation Party claims responsibility for the bombings.
19 August 1997	Urumqi, Xinjiang		Two gunmen shot into a crowd after attempting to rob shopkeepers in Urumqi, killing 7 people and hospitalizing 11.
1 October 1997	Kuytun, Xinjiang		Uyghur separatists detonate a bomb in Kutyun, killing 22 people.
February – April 1998	Qaghiliq, Xinjiang		A series of six explosions occurred in February and March aimed at economic and industrial targets. The following month, authorities reported that bombs exploded at homes and offices of local communist party and public security agents.
19 April 1998	Xinjiang		A police officer and two separatist militants were killed in a shootout during a police siege of a separatist hideout. Another police officer was wounded and four separatists captured during the operation.
25 June 1999	Urumqi, Xinjiang		A bus is bombed by Uighur separatists, killing one and injuring 50.
16 March 2001	Shijiazhuang, Hebei	Shijiazhuang bombings	108 civilians were killed when several ANFO bombs (similar to those used by the IRA and in the 1993 World Trade Center and 1995 Oklahoma City bombings) tore through four city blocks in the city of Shijiazhang. The perpetrator, 41-year-old Jin Ruchao, was allegedly motivated by hatred of his ex-wife. The bombings were described in The New York Times as the deadliest mass murder in decades, and was characterized by China scholar Andrew Scobell as perhaps the worst terrorist act in the history of the People's Republic of China.
3 April 2002	Chengdu, Sichuan		On 3 April 2002, a bomb described as a "simple fuse device" detonated in Tianfu Square in Chengdu, the capital of Sichuan. According to local media reports, one individual was seriously injured, and many others were hurt in the blast. Two men were apprehended: 52-year-old Tibetan religious leader Tenzin Deleg Rinpoche, and 26-year-old Lobsang Dondrub. On 2 December, Rinpoche was given a two-year suspended death sentence for "causing explosions [and] inciting the separation of the state." Dondrub was also sentenced to death, and executed on 26 January 2003. The men maintained their innocence, and international observers expressed concerns over the legality of the trial.
5 January 2007	Pamirs Plateau, Xinjiang	Xinjiang raid	Chinese armed police raided a suspected East Turkestan Islamic Movement (ETIM) training camp in Akto County in the Pamirs plateau near the border between Afghanistan and Pakistan. A spokesperson for the Xinjiang Public Security Bureau said that 18 terror suspects were killed and 17 captured. The raid also resulted in the death of one Chinese police officer and the injury of another. The Bureau said they confiscated hand grenades, guns, and makeshift explosives from the site.
9 March 2008	Urumqi, Xinjiang		State-run Xinhua News Agency reported that authorities had successfully foiled a terrorist attack on a commercial jet. The Southern China flight departed from Urumqi, and made an emergency landing in Lanzhou while en route to Beijing. Two individuals were reportedly taken into custody after flight crew discovered flammable material in the plane's toilet. Xinjiang Governor Nuer Baikeli told reporters that the perpetrators "attempted to create an air disaster," but authorities provided no further details.
4 August 2008	Kashgar, Xinjiang	2008 Kashgar attack	ETIM militants reportedly drove a truck into a group of approximately 70 jogging policemen. According to official Chinese media accounts, they then got out of the truck wielding machetes, and lobbed grenades at the officers, killing 16 people. Police investigators recovered explosives as well as a homemade firearm.
10 August 2008	Kuqa County, Xinjiang		Xinhua reported that seven men armed with homemade explosives reportedly drove taxis into government buildings, in Kuqa, Xinjiang, injuring at least two police officers and a security guard. Five of the assailants were shot and killed. The attacks began at 2:30 am when five assailants drove taxis into the local public security and industry and commerce buildings. The Communist Party chief in Xinjiang condemned the attack as an act of terrorism, and suspected the ETIM was responsible.
12 August 2008	Yamanya, Xinjiang		Chinese media reported that three security officers were killed in a stabbing incident in Yamanya, near Kashgar in Xinjiang. The report did not specify what the attacker's affiliations were.
5 July 2009	Ürümqi, Xinjiang	July 2009 Ürümqi riots	Eligen Imibakhi, chairman of the Standing Committee of the Xinjiang Regional People's Congress, blamed 5 July riots on the "Three evils", which were "extremism, separatism and terrorism".
19 August 2010	Aksu, Xinjiang	2010 Aksu bombing	According to Chinese media reports, six ethnic Uyghur men were allegedly involved in loading a vehicle with explosives and driving into a group of security officers at a highway intersection near Aksu, Xinjiang. Seven people, including two attackers, were killed, according to police. In the wake of the attack, authorities in the region vowed to crack down "relentlessly" on criminal activity.
18 July 2011	Hotan, Xinjiang	2011 Hotan attack	Chinese media reported that 18 people died when 18 young Uyghur men stormed a police station in the city of Hotan. The men stabbed a security guard and two female hostages, and killed another security guard with a bomb. The attack ended when security officers shot and killed 14 of the attackers. Chinese media described the attackers as rioters and thugs, though subsequent accounts called the event a terrorist attack. The Germany-based World Uyghur Congress claimed that the authorities provoked clashes by opening fire on Uyghurs participating in a non-violent protest against heavy-handed security crackdowns in the city. The Turkistan Islamic Party later claimed responsibility for the attack.
30–31 July 2011	Kashgar, Xinjiang	2011 Kashgar attacks	At least 18 people died in a series of alleged terrorist attacks in the city of Kashgar. According to state-run media accounts, the violence began when two Uyghur men hijacked a truck, ran it into a crowded street, and started stabbing people, killing six. The attack ended when the assailants were overpowered by the crowd, which killed one attacker. On the second day, state media reported that a "group of armed terrorists" stormed a restaurant, killed the owner and a waiter, and set it ablaze. They then proceeded to indiscriminately kill four more civilians. Armed clashes then reportedly ensured, ending with police capturing or killing the attackers. The Turkistan Islamic Party later claimed responsibility for the attack. One of the suspects appeared in a TIP video training in Pakistan.
29 June 2012	Xinjiang	Tianjin Airlines Flight GS7554	Chinese official media reported that six men attempted to hijack Tianjin Airlines flight GS7554 from Hotan to Urumqi, Xinjiang. The men reportedly sought to gain access to cockpit ten minutes after takeoff, but were stopped by passengers and crew. A spokesperson for the Xinjiang government said the men were ethnic Uyghurs. Xinhua reported at least 10 passengers and crew were injured when six hijackers tried to take control of the aircraft. The World Uyghur Congress contested the official account of events, claiming instead that a dispute over seating broke out between Uyghurs and ethnic Han. The WUC suggested the event was being used as a pretext to "reinforce repression" in Xinjiang.
24 April 2013	Xinjiang	2013 Xinjiang ethnic clashes	It was an incident of ethnic clash that took place between Muslim Uyghur and Han Chinese community. As reported by BBC 21 people were killed in the incident including 15 police officers and local government officials.
26 June 2013	Lukqun, Xinjiang		At least 35 people were killed in clashes between ethnic Uyghurs and police in the deadliest altercation in the region since 2009. Chinese official media reported that a group of 17 knife-wielding Uyghur men attacked a police station and government building. Chinese authorities pronounced the event a terrorist attack, and blamed separatists and overseas forces for fomenting tensions. The World Uyghur Congress blamed the event on "continued suppression and provocation" by Chinese authorities in the region. Foreign media outlets were prevented from visiting the area to investigate.
28 October 2013	Tiananmen Square, Beijing	2013 Tiananmen Square attack	A car blaze at Tiananmen Square that killed five and injured dozens was a premeditated terrorist attack, Chinese police said after making five arrests in connection with the case.
1 March 2014	Kunming, Yunnan	Kunming station massacre	A group of knife-wielding men and women attacked people at the Kunming Railway Station. The attack left 33 civilians and 4 perpetrators dead with more than 140 others injured.
30 April 2014	Ürümqi, Xinjiang	April 2014 Ürümqi attack	A knife attack and bombing occurred in the Chinese city of Ürümqi, the capital of China's Xinjiang Uyghur Autonomous Region. The attack left three people dead and seventy-nine others injured.
22 May 2014	Ürümqi, Xinjiang	May 2014 Ürümqi attack	Two sport utility vehicles (SUVs) carrying five assailants were driven into a busy street market in Ürümqi. Up to a dozen explosives were thrown at shoppers from the windows of the SUVs. The SUVs crashed into shoppers then collided with each other and exploded. 43 people were killed, including 4 of the assailants, and more than 90 wounded.
28 November 2014	Xinjiang		Militants with knives and explosives attacked civilians, 15 dead and 14 injured. 14 of the 15 deaths were attackers.
6 March 2015	Guangzhou		Three ethnic Uyghur assailants with long knives attacked civilians at Guangzhou train station, 13 injured.
24 June 2015	Xinjiang		Group killed several police with knives and bombs at traffic checkpoint before 15 suspects died in armed response.
18 September 2015	Aksu, Xinjiang	Sogan colliery attack	An unidentified group of knife-wielding men attacked off-duty workers at a coalmine, killing 50, among them 5 police officers.
29 December 2016	Xinjiang		Four Islamic militants drove a vehicle into a yard at the county Communist party offices and set off a bomb but were all shot dead. Three people were wounded and one other died.

== Terrorist incidents by year ==
Terrorist incidents in China according to the Global Terrorism Database
Year	Number of incidents	Deaths	Injuries
2019	13	0	12
2018	1	2	2
2017	6	16	76
2016	5	13	18
2015	16	123	83
2014	37	322	478
2013	12	60	71
2012	4	27	38
2011	4	19	32
2010	1	7	14
2009	7	186	56
2008	20	23	133
2007	0	0	0
2006	1	1	1
2005	1	12	2
2004	2	4	5
2003	3	1	16
2002	2	1	18
2001	13	25	65
2000	4	1	2
1999	2	5	50
1998	2	50	150
1997	18	57	259
1996	62	23	106
1995	8	6	198
1994	13	18	96
1993	1	0	0
1992	5	9	20
1991	1	0	0
1990	1	2	10
1989	3	20	12

== Counter-terrorism ==
=== Domestic counter-terrorism ===
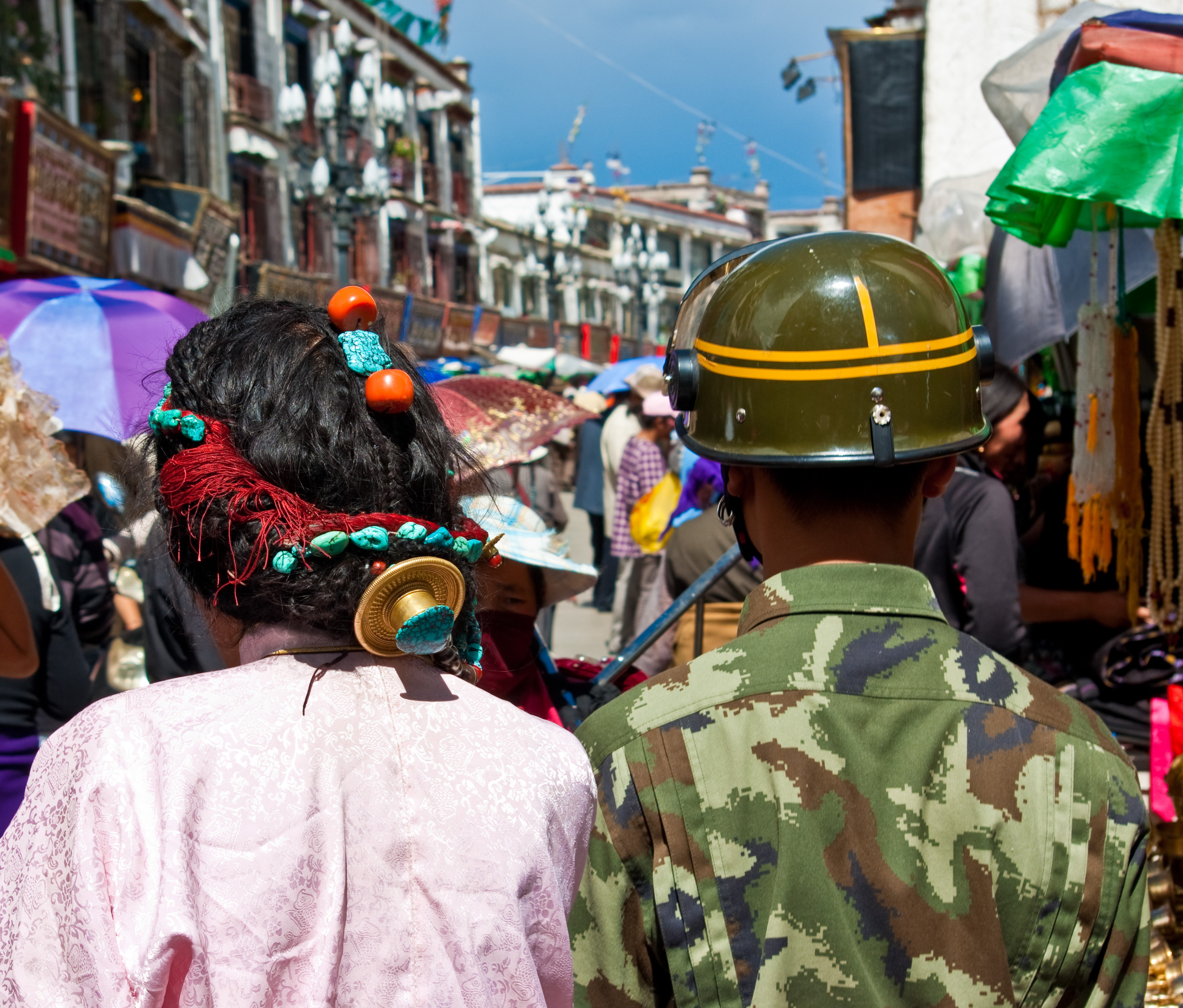
A soldier on patrol Lhasa, Tibet. Chinese authorities have launched "strike-hard" campaigns targeting unsanctioned religious activity and separatism.

According to political scientist Chung Chien-peng, following a spate of unrest and violence in Xinjiang and Tibet in the late 1980s and early 1990s, Chinese authorities adopted a variety of approaches to suppress what they consider the "three evils." These are: terrorism, separatism, and religious fundamentalism, which the government considers to be interconnected threats to its authorities. To combat these, the government promoted economic development through investments in infrastructure, tourism, and capital investment to spur growth, and encouraged ethnic Han migration into the western regions. In addition, authorities launched "strike hard" campaigns against crime, which also had the effect of targeting expressions of separatism and unauthorized religious practice.

Chung noted that in recent years, Chinese authorities have allowed for a gradual expansion of individual freedoms in many spheres, all the while maintaining strict control over religious, cultural, and literary associations of ethnic minorities in Xinjiang and Tibet. In 1997, a "strike hard" campaign began in Tibet and Xinjiang involving tightly controlling religious activities and festivals. In Tibet, authorities sought to curtail the influence of the Dalai Lama by banning all displays of his image, and in 1995, authorities replaced his choice of the number two Panchen Lama with a Beijing-approved candidate. In Xinjiang, authorities placed restrictions on unofficial religious practices, and closely monitored Muslims returning from madrasah schools overseas.

Chung also noted that corresponding to the launch of strike-hard campaigns and economic stimulus efforts, there was an apparent decrease in the level of organized violent protest or bombings in the Western autonomous regions. Whereas levels of anti-government violence were high from 1987 to 1997, reported instances were virtually non-existent in the several years that followed. In the aftermath of the strike-hard campaigns, Tibetan and Uyghur dissident groups overseas have adjusted their strategies in promoting their causes: as of 1998, the Dalai Lama no longer called for outright Tibetan independence, and Uyghur groups have become more adept in framing their cause as one of human rights and free elections. Chung noted that while instances of violent organized protest and bombings have decreased, heightened tensions between local ethnic groups and the Han Chinese who have migrated into Xinjiang and Tibet en masse since the 1990s. According to Chung, in terms of public relations and reporting incidents of violence, local authorities are encouraged to take into account foreign investments so that they would not be discouraged by violence, but at the same time, authorities need justifications to initiate actions against separatist groups.

=== International cooperation ===
The government of the People's Republic of China has engaged in cooperation at the bilateral and multilateral level to gain support for its efforts to combat terrorism and ethnic separatism. This has increased following the September 11 attacks in the United States, which led to the global war on terror.

Much of this cooperation involves the Shanghai Cooperation Organisation, which includes several Central Asian states home to large ethnic Uyghur populations. The Chinese government has periodically requested that authorities in Kyrgyzstan and Kazakhstan crack down on Uyghur secessionists, and that they extradite suspected terrorists and separatists to China. The Government of Kazakhstan has consistently extradited Uyghur terrorist suspects to China and in 2006 participated in a large-scale, joint counter-terrorism drill.

The Chinese and Kyrgyz governments increased security along their borders with each other and Tajikistan in January 2007 after Chinese government officials expressed concern that possible terrorists were traveling through Xinjiang and Central Asia to carry out attacks. The warning followed a high-profile raid on a training camp in Akto County, Xinjiang run by suspected East Turkestan Islamic Movement members.

In 2006, American forces captured 22 Uyghur militants from combat zones in Afghanistan and Pakistan on information that they were linked to Al-Qaeda. They were imprisoned for five to seven years in Guantanamo Bay, where they testified that they were trained by ETIM leader Abdul Haq, at an ETIM training camp. After being reclassified as No Longer Enemy Combatant, a panel of judges ordered them released into the United States, as they could not be released back to China because of human rights concerns. A Chinese government spokesman denounced the move as a violation of international law and demanded the return of the men to China.

== See also ==
- Terrorism in Central Asia
- Terrorism in Russia
- Crime in the People's Republic of China
- East Turkestan Islamic Movement
- Istanbul nightclub shooting
- Islamic terrorism in Europe
- List of terrorist incidents
- Terrorism in the United States
- Hindu terrorism
- Left-wing terrorism
- Right-wing terrorism
- Uyghur terrorism in Pakistan
