= List of designated terrorist groups =

Several national governments and two international bodies have created lists of organizations that they designate as terrorist. The following list of designated terrorist groups is composed of groups on whom a "terrorist" designation had been officially issued, whether by current or former national governments, or inter-governmental organizations.

Many organizations that have been designated as terrorist have denied using terrorism as a military tactic to achieve their goals, and there is no international consensus on the legal definition of terrorism.

This listing does not include unaffiliated individuals accused of terrorism, which is considered lone wolf terrorism. This list also excludes groups who might be widely considered terrorist but were not officially designated as such.

== Organizations designated as terrorist ==
=== By the United Nations Security Council Committee ===
Organizations listed by the United Nations Security Council and ISIL (Da'esh) and Al-Qaida Sanctions Committee.

| Organization | | Designators |
|---|---|---|
| Jihad | Abdullah Azzam Brigades (Note: Highlight showcases which groups are now defunct.) | United Nations, Argentina, Bahrain, Canada, Iraq, Japan, New Zealand, United Arab Emirates, United Kingdom, United States |
| | Abu Sayyaf | United Nations, Argentina, Australia, Bahrain, Canada, Japan, Malaysia, New Zealand, Philippines, United Arab Emirates, United Kingdom, United States |
| | Aden-Abyan Islamic Army | United Nations, Argentina, Bahrain, Japan, New Zealand, United Kingdom |
| Jihad | Al-Itihaad al-Islamiya | United Nations, Argentina, Japan, New Zealand, United Kingdom |
| | Al-Mourabitoun (Note: United States designation of Al-Mourabitoun was done as an alias of Al-Mulathameen.) | United Nations, Argentina, Australia, Bahrain, Canada, Iraq, Japan, New Zealand, United Arab Emirates, United Kingdom, United States |
| Jihad | al-Qaeda | United Nations, European Union, Argentina, Australia, Bahrain, Brazil, Canada, China, India, Indonesia, Iran, Israel, Japan, Kazakhstan, Kyrgyzstan, Malaysia, New Zealand, Pakistan, Paraguay, Philippines, Russia, Saudi Arabia, Tajikistan, Turkey, United Arab Emirates, United Kingdom, United States |
| | al-Qaeda in the Arabian Peninsula | United Nations, Argentina, Australia, Bahrain, Canada, Japan, Malaysia, New Zealand, Saudi Arabia, United Arab Emirates, United States |
| Jihad | al-Qaeda in the Islamic Maghreb | United Nations, Argentina, Australia, Bahrain, Canada, Japan, Malaysia, New Zealand, Russia, United Arab Emirates, United States, United Kingdom |
| | Al-Shabaab | United Nations, European Union, Australia, Canada, Israel, Japan, Kenya, Malaysia, Netherlands, New Zealand, Saudi Arabia, Singapore, South Africa, Switzerland, Tanzania, Uganda, United Arab Emirates, United Kingdom, United States |
| | Ansar al-Islam | United Nations, Argentina, Australia, Bahrain, Canada, Japan, New Zealand, United Arab Emirates, United Kingdom, United States |
| | Ansar al-Sharia (Libya) (Note: Iraq and United States lists Ansar al-Sharia in Libya as two separate organizations: Ansar al-Sharia in Benghazi and Ansar al-Sharia in Darnah.) | United Nations, Argentina, Bahrain, Iraq, Japan, New Zealand, Turkey, United Arab Emirates, United Kingdom, United States |
| | Ansar al-Sharia in Tunisia | United Nations, Argentina, Bahrain, Iraq, Japan, New Zealand, Tunisia, United Arab Emirates, United Kingdom, United States |
| | Ansar Dine | United Nations, Argentina, Bahrain, Iraq, Japan, New Zealand, United Arab Emirates, United States, Canada, United Kingdom |
| | Ansaru | United Nations, Argentina, Bahrain, Iraq, Japan, New Zealand, United Kingdom, United States |
| | Armed Islamic Group of Algeria | United Nations, Argentina, Bahrain, Canada, Japan, New Zealand, United Kingdom, United States |
| | Asbat al-Ansar | United Nations, Argentina, Bahrain, Canada, Japan, Kazakhstan, New Zealand, Russia, United Arab Emirates, United Kingdom, United States |
| | Boko Haram | United Nations, Australia, Bahrain, Canada, Iraq, Japan, Malaysia, New Zealand, Turkey, United Arab Emirates, United Kingdom, United States |
| Caucasian Emirate | Caucasus Emirate | United Nations, Argentina, Bahrain, Canada, Japan, New Zealand, Russia, United Arab Emirates, United Kingdom, United States |
| | Egyptian Islamic Jihad (Note: Egyptian Islamic Jihad is considered an alias of Al-Qaeda by Canada.) | United Nations, Argentina, Bahrain, Canada, Japan, New Zealand, Russia, United Kingdom |
| Taliban | Haqqani network | United Nations, Argentina, Canada, Japan, New Zealand, United Arab Emirates, United Kingdom, United States |
| | Harakat Sham al-Islam | United Nations, Argentina, Bahrain, Japan, New Zealand, United States, Morocco |
| | Harkat-ul-Jihad al-Islami | United Nations, Argentina, Bahrain, Japan, New Zealand, United Kingdom, United States, India |
| | Harkat-ul-Mujahideen | United Nations, Argentina, Bahrain, Canada, Japan, New Zealand, India, United Kingdom, United States |
| | Islamic Jihad Union | United Nations, Argentina, China, Kyrgyzstan, New Zealand, Pakistan, United Kingdom, United States |
| Jihad | Islamic Movement of Uzbekistan | United Nations, Argentina, Australia, Bahrain, Canada, China, Japan, Kazakhstan, Kyrgyzstan, New Zealand, Pakistan, Russia, Tajikistan, United Arab Emirates, United Kingdom, United States |
| | Islamic State – Sahel Province | United Nations, Argentina, Canada, Iraq, Japan, New Zealand, United States |
| | Islamic State | United Nations, European Union, Argentina, Australia, Bahrain, Canada, China, Egypt, India, Indonesia, Iraq, Iran, Israel, Japan, Jordan, Kazakhstan, Kuwait, Kyrgyzstan Lebanon, Malaysia, New Zealand, Pakistan, Paraguay, Russia, Saudi Arabia, Tajikistan, Turkey, United Arab Emirates, United Kingdom, United States Philippines |
| | Islamic State – Khorasan Province | United Nations, Argentina, Australia, Canada, Iraq, Japan, New Zealand, India, United States |
| | Islamic State – Libya Province | United Nations, Argentina, Australia, Iraq, Japan, United States, Canada, New Zealand |
| | Islamic State – Yemen Province | United Nations, Iraq, Argentina, Japan, United States, New Zealand |
| | Islamic State – West Africa Province | United Nations, Argentina, Japan, United States, Canada, New Zealand, Australia |
| | Islamic State – Algeria Province | United Nations, Argentina, Bahrain, Japan, Kazakhstan, New Zealand, United Kingdom, |
| | Islamic State – Tunisia Province | United Nations, European Union, United States, United Kingdom, Argentina, China, Philippines, Latvia, Albania, Czech Republic, Mauritius, Isle of Man, Bailiwick of Guernsey, Cayman Islands, The Bahamas, Pakistan, Jamaica, Holy See, New Zealand |
| Jaysh al-Muhajireen wal-Ansar | Jaish al-Muhajireen wal-Ansar | United Nations, Bahrain, Canada, Japan, New Zealand, United States |
| | Jaish-e-Mohammed | United Nations, European Union, United States, United Kingdom, Isle of Man, Pakistan, Panama, Switzerland, South Africa, Thailand, Latvia, Uzbekistan, Cyprus, Argentina, Australia, South Korea, Nigeria, New Zealand, Luxembourg, Liechtenstein, Trinidad and Tobago, Moldova, Israel, Ukraine, Nauru, Taiwan, Namibia, Azerbaijan, Philippines, France, Indonesia |
| | Jamaah Ansharut Daulah | United Nations, Argentina, Indonesia, Japan, United States, New Zealand |
| | Jamaah Ansharut Tauhid | United Nations, Bahrain, Argentina, Indonesia, Japan, Malaysia, New Zealand, United States, United Kingdom |
| Jama'at Nusrat al-Islam wal-Muslimin | Jama'at Nusrat al-Islam wal Muslimin (Note: Jama'at Nusrat al-Islam wal Muslimin is considered an alias of Al-Mourabitoun by Canada.) | United Nations, Canada, Argentina, Iraq, New Zealand, United Kingdom, United States, Australia |
| Jihad | Jamaat-ul-Ahrar | United Nations, Argentina, Japan, New Zealand, Pakistan, United Kingdom, United States |
| | Jamiat ul-Ansar (Note: Harkat ul-Ansar is considered an alias of Harkat-ul-Mujahideen by the United Nations.) | United Nations, Australia, Canada, (Note: Canada lists Harkat ul-Ansar under the Harkat-ul-Mujahideen entry.) New Zealand, India, Pakistan |
| Jihad | Jemaah Islamiyah | United Nations, Argentina, Australia, Bahrain, Canada,Indonesia,Japan, Malaysia, New Zealand, United Kingdom, United States |
| | Jund al-Aqsa | United Nations, Argentina, Japan, Malaysia, New Zealand, Saudi Arabia, United Kingdom, United States |
| | Katibat al-Imam al-Bukhari | United Nations, Argentina, Iraq, New Zealand, Japan, Kyrgyzstan United States |
| | Katibat al-Tawhid wal-Jihad | United Nations, Argentina, United States, Russia, Kyrgyzstan Moldova, Israel, New Zealand |
| | Lashkar-e-Taiba | United Nations, Argentina, Australia, Bahrain, Canada, India, Japan, New Zealand, Pakistan, Tajikistan, Russia, United Arab Emirates, United Kingdom, United States |
| | Lashkar-e-Jhangvi | United Nations, Argentina, Australia, Bahrain, Canada, Japan, New Zealand, Pakistan, United Kingdom, United States |
| | Libyan Islamic Fighting Group | United Nations, Argentina, Bahrain, Japan, New Zealand |
| | Moroccan Islamic Combatant Group | United Nations, Argentina, Bahrain, Japan, New Zealand, United Kingdom, Morocco |
| | Movement for Oneness and Jihad in West Africa | United Nations, Argentina, Bahrain, Canada, Japan, New Zealand, United States |
| Eastern Indonesian Mujahideen | Mujahidin Indonesia Timur | United Nations, Argentina, Bahrain, Japan, Indonesia, Malaysia, New Zealand, United Kingdom |
| Caucasian Emirate | Riyad-us Saliheen Brigade of Martyrs | United Nations, European Union, Argentina, United States, United Kingdom, France, Spain, Australia, New Zealand, China, South Korea, Singapore, Pakistan, Cyprus, Hong Kong, Latvia, Isle of Man, South Africa, Malta, East Timor, Trinidad and Tobago |
| | Society of the Revival of Islamic Heritage | United Nations, Argentina, Bahrain, Japan, New Zealand, Russia |
| | Tariq Gidar Group | United Nations, United States, United Kingdom, Isle of Man, France, Argentina, Australia, Spain, Latvia, Israel, Macau, Trinidad and Tobago Japan, Taiwan, Pakistan, Thailand, South Africa, Iraq, Jordan, Moldova, Uzbekistan, Angola, Nicaragua, Panama, Nauru, New Zealand |
| | Tehrik-i-Taliban Pakistan | United Nations, Argentina, Bahrain, Canada, China, Iran, Japan, New Zealand, Pakistan, Russia, United Arab Emirates, United Kingdom, United States |
| | Turkistan Islamic Party | United Nations, European Union, Argentina, China, Japan, Kazakhstan, Kyrgyzstan Malaysia, New Zealand, Pakistan, Turkey, United Kingdom |

=== Other organizations ===
| Organization | | Designators |
|---|---|---|
| | 18th Street gang | El Salvador, United States, Guatemala, Honduras, Argentina, Bolivia, Chile, Colombia, Costa Rica, Dominican Republic, Ecuador, Guyana, Panama, Paraguay, Peru, Trinidad and Tobago |
| | 48th Assault Battalion | Russia |
| | 764 | Canada |
| | Abu Nidal Organization | European Union, Canada, Japan, United Kingdom |
| | Addameer | Israel |
| | Aid Organization of the Ulema | Argentina, New Zealand |
| | Aidar Battalion | Russia |
| | Ajnad al-Sham | United Kingdom |
| | Soldiers of Egypt (Ajnad Misr) | Egypt, United Arab Emirates, United Kingdom, United States |
| Nepal | Akhil Bharat Nepali Ekta Samaj | India |
| | Al-Andalus Media | United States |
| | al-Aqsa Foundation | Argentina, European Union, United States |
| | al-Aqsa Martyrs' Brigades | European Union, Canada, Japan, New Zealand, United States |
| | Al-Ashtar Brigades | Bahrain, Canada, United Kingdom, United States |
| | Al-Badr | India, United States |
| | Alex Boncayao Brigade | United States |
| | Al Ghurabaa | United Kingdom |
| | Al-Haq | Israel |
| | al-Haramain (Note: The United Nations lists several individual al-Haramain Foundation branches.) | Argentina, Russia |
| | Al-Hayat Media Center | United States |
| Jihad | al-Jama'a al-Islamiyya | European Union, Argentina, Canada, Israel, Russia, United Arab Emirates, United Kingdom, United States Egypt |
| | All Tripura Tiger Force | India |
| | Al-I'tisam Media Foundation | United States |
| | Al-Kataib Media Foundation | United States |
| | Al-Malahem Media | United States |
| Jihad | Al-Muhajiroun | Saudi Arabia, United Kingdom |
| | Al-Nusra Front (Note: Al-Nusra Front is considered an alias of Hay'at Tahrir al-Sham by New Zealand and the United States. It is considered an alias of Al-Qaeda by the United Kingdom. Australia acknowledges that Al-Nusra Front is part of the umbrella group Hayat Tahrir al-Sham, but it does not list Hayat Tahrir al-Sham as a terrorist organization.) | Argentina, Australia, Bahrain, Iran, Iraq, Japan, Kazakhstan, Kuwait, Kyrgyzstan Lebanon, Malaysia, Syria, Russia, Saudi Arabia, Tajikistan, Turkey, United Arab Emirates, United Kingdom, |
| AQIS | al-Qaeda in Iraq | Argentina, United States, Canada, New Zealand |
| AQIS | al-Qaeda in the Indian Subcontinent | Australia, Canada, India, Japan, Pakistan, United States |
| | Al-Umar-Mujahideen | India |
| | Al Wafa al Igatha al Islamia | Argentina, United States, New Zealand |
| | Amaq News Agency | United States |
| | Anti-Corruption Foundation | Russia |
| | Ansarullah Bangla Team | United Kingdom |
| | Ansar Bait al-Maqdis (Note: Ansar Bait al-Maqdis is considered an alias of Islamic State of Iraq and the Levant – Sinai Province by Australia, Canada, New Zealand and the United States.) | Australia, Canada, Egypt, New Zealand, United Arab Emirates, United Kingdom, United States |
| | Ansar Khalifa Philippines (Note: Australia lists Ansar Khalifa Philippines under the Islamic State East Asia entry.) | Australia, Malaysia |
| | Ansar ul Islam | United Kingdom, United States |
| | Antifa Ost | United States, Hungary |
| | April 19 University Movement | Nicaragua |
| Arabistan | Arab Struggle Movement for the Liberation of Ahvaz | Iran |
| | Arakan Army | Myanmar |
| | Arakan Rohingya Salvation Army | Malaysia, Myanmar |
| | Argentine Air Force | Iran |
| | Argentine Navy | Iran |
| | Armed Forces of Popular Resistance | United States |
| | Army of Islam | United Arab Emirates, United States |
| Iraq | Army of the Men of the Naqshbandi Order | United States |
| | Artpodgotovka | Russia |
| | Aryan Strikeforce | Canada |
| | As-Sahab | United States |
| | Asa'ib Ahl al-Haq | United Arab Emirates, United States |
| | ATK Group | Ukraine |
| | Atomwaffen Division | Australia, Austria, Canada, Estonia, Italy, United Kingdom, |
| | A.U.E. | Russia |
| | Aum Shinrikyo | Canada, European Union, Kazakhstan, Russia |
| | Autistici/Inventati | United States |
| | Az-Zallaqa Foundation | European Union, United States, United Kingdom, Isle of Man |
| | Azov Battalion | Russia |
| | Babbar Khalsa International | European Union, Canada, India, Japan, Malaysia, United Kingdom |
| | Badr Organization | United Arab Emirates |
| | Bahrain Freedom Movement | Bahrain |
| | Balochistan Liberation Army | China, European Union, Iran, Pakistan, Russia, United Kingdom, United States |
| | Baloch Students Organization | Pakistan |
| | Bangladesh Chhatra League | Bangladesh |
| | Bangsamoro Islamic Freedom Fighters (Note: Australia lists Bangsamoro Islamic Freedom Fighters under the Islamic State East Asia entry.) | Australia, Malaysia, Philippines |
| | The Base | European Union, Canada, United Kingdom, Australia, New Zealand |
| fictional "Belgorod People's Republic" | Belgorod People's Republic | Russia |
| | Benevolence International Foundation | Argentina, New Zealand |
| | Bisan Center | Israel |
| | Bishnoi gang | Canada |
| | Black Bridge | Russia |
| | Blood & Honour | Canada |
| | Boricua Popular Army | United States |
| | BYPOL | Belarus |
| | Boat People SOS | Vietnam |
| | Centre for Applied Nonviolent Action and Strategies | United Arab Emirates |
| | Redut-Antiterror | Ukraine |
| | Civil protection under the Ministry of Internal Affairs of the Republic of Serbia | Republic of Kosovo |
| AGC | Clan del Golfo | Colombia, United States, El Salvador, Bolivia, Chile, Costa Rica, Dominican Republic, Honduras, Guyana, Panama, Paraguay, Argentina, Ecuador, Peru, Trinidad and Tobago |
| | Coalition of Patriots for Change | Central African Republic |
| | Cartel of the Suns | Argentina, Peru, United States, Paraguay, Ecuador, Dominican Republic, Costa Rica, Colombia, El Salvador, Bolivia, Chile, Honduras, Guyana, Panama, Trinidad and Tobago |
| | Cártel del Noreste | United States, Costa Rica, El Salvador, Bolivia, Chile, Colombia, Dominican Republic, Honduras, Guyana, Panama, Paraguay, Argentina, Ecuador, Peru, Trinidad and Tobago |
| | Cárteles Unidos | United States, Canada, Costa Rica, El Salvador, Bolivia, Chile, Colombia, Dominican Republic, Honduras, Guyana, Panama, Paraguay, Argentina, Ecuador, Peru, Trinidad and Tobago |
| | Comando Vermelho | Argentina, Paraguay, United States, El Salvador, Bolivia, Chile, Honduras, Guyana, Panama, Trinidad and Tobago, Colombia, Costa Rica, Dominican Republic, Ecuador, Peru |
| | Combat 18 | Canada |
| | Committee for Charity and Solidarity with Palestine | Israel |
| | Communist Party of India (Maoist) | India |
| | Communist Party of India (Marxist–Leninist) People's War | India |
| | Communist Party of the Philippines | European Union, Japan, New Zealand, Philippines, United States |
| | New People's Army | European Union, Japan, New Zealand, Philippines, United States |
| Communist Party of Turkey-Marxist–Leninist | Communist Party of Turkey/Marxist–Leninist | Turkey |
| | Congress of People's Deputies | Russia |
| Majlis of Muslims of Ichkeria and Dagestan | Congress of the Peoples of Ichkeria and Dagestan | Russia |
| | Conspiracy of Fire Nuclei | United States |
| | Continuity Irish Republican Army | New Zealand, United Kingdom, United States |
| | Coordinadora Arauco-Malleco | Chile |
| | Conquering Self-Defense Forces of the Sierra Nevada | Costa Rica |
| | Council on American–Islamic Relations | Florida, Texas (United States), United Arab Emirates |
| | Cumann na mBan | United Kingdom |
| Islamic State of Indonesia | Darul Islam | Indonesia |
| | Deendar Anjuman | India |
| | Defence for Children International Palestine branch | Israel |
| | Dnipro-1 Regiment | Russia |
| | Donbas Battalion | Russia |
| | Donetsk People's Republic | Ukraine |
| | Dukhtaran-e-Millat | India |
| | Earth Liberation Front | United States |
| | East Turkestan Information Center | China |
| | East Turkestan Liberation Organization | China, Kazakhstan, Kyrgyzstan |
| | E.N.O.T. Corp. | Ukraine |
| Europe | Armies of the European Union | Iran |
| | Euskadi Ta Askatasuna | Canada, France, European Union, United Kingdom, United States, Spain |
| | February 14 Youth Coalition | Bahrain |
| | Fianna Éireann | United Kingdom |
| | First of October Anti-Fascist Resistance Groups | European Union, Spain |
| | Force 17 | Israel |
| | Freedom of Russia Legion | Russia |
| | Free Nations of Post-Russia Forum | Russia |
| | Free Nations League | Russia |
| | Free Papua Movement | Indonesia |
| | Free Yakutia Foundation | Russia |
| | Fuerzas Armadas de Liberación Nacional Puertorriqueña | United States |
| | Garo National Liberation Army | India |
| | Georgian National Legion | Russia |
| | Gran Grif gang | United States, Dominican Republic, El Salvador, Bolivia, Chile, Honduras, Guyana, Panama, Trinidad and Tobago, Colombia, Paraguay, Costa Rica, Ecuador, Peru, Argentina |
| | Great Eastern Islamic Raiders' Front | European Union, Turkey |
| | Global Islamic Media Front | United Kingdom |
| | Global Relief Foundation | Argentina, New Zealand |
| | Grey Wolves | Kazakhstan, France, European Parliament |
| | Gulf Cartel | United States, Canada, Costa Rica, El Salvador, Bolivia, Chile, Colombia, Dominican Republic, Honduras, Guyana, Panama, Paraguay, Argentina, Ecuador, Peru, Trinidad and Tobago |
| | Gülen movement | Gulf Cooperation Council, Pakistan, Turkey |
| al-Qassam Brigades | Hamas | European Union, Argentina, Australia, Canada, Ecuador, Israel, Japan, New Zealand, Paraguay, Philippines Switzerland, Trinidad and Tobago, United Kingdom, United States, Organization of American States, Costa Rica, Honduras, Sudan (Government of Peace and Unity under Rapid Support Forces) |
| | Harakat Ansar Allah al-Awfiya | United States, Latvia |
| | Harakat Hezbollah al-Nujaba | United States |
| | Harkat-ul-Jihad-al-Islami Bangladesh | New Zealand, United Kingdom, United States Bangladesh |
| Harkat-ul-Mujahideen | Harakat-Ul-Mujahideen/Alami | Japan, United Kingdom |
| | Hasm Movement | Canada, Egypt, United Kingdom, United States |
| | Hay'at Tahrir al-Sham | European Union, Argentina, Australia, Morocco, Russia, Turkey, |
| Hezbi Islami Gulbuddin | Hezb-e Islami Gulbuddin | Canada |
| (Hezbollah) | Hezbollah | Gulf Cooperation Council, Argentina, Australia, Bahrain, Canada, Colombia, Costa Rica, Ecuador, Germany, Honduras, Israel, Malaysia, New Zealand, Paraguay, Saudi Arabia, Switzerland, Trinidad and Tobago, United Arab Emirates, United Kingdom, United States |
| (Hezbollah) | Hezbollah (Military wing only) | European Union, Ukraine |
| | Hezbollah Al-Hejaz | Saudi Arabia, United Arab Emirates |
| | Hezbollah in Latin America | Argentina, Colombia, Honduras, Paraguay, Guatemala, Ecuador |
| | Headquarters Group | Sri Lanka |
| Jihad | Hizb ut-Tahrir | China, Egypt, Indonesia, Iran, Kazakhstan, Pakistan, Russia, Saudi Arabia, Tunisia, Tajikistan, Turkey, United Kingdom |
| | Hizbul Mujahideen | European Union, India, United States, Canada |
| | Holy Land Foundation for Relief and Development | Japan, Israel |
| | Houthis | Australia, Bahrain Canada, Costa Rica, Israel, Malaysia, New Zealand, Saudi Arabia, Ukraine, United Arab Emirates, United States, Yemen (Presidential Leadership Council) |
| Tanzim Hurras al-Din | Hurras al-Din | United States, Australia |
| Jihad | Indian Mujahideen | Canada, India, Japan, New Zealand, United Arab Emirates, United Kingdom, United States |
| | Informal Anarchist Federation/International Revolutionary Front | United States |
| | International LGBT movement | Russia |
| | International Islamic Relief Organization | New Zealand |
| | International Relief Fund for the Afflicted and Needy – Canada | Canada |
| | International Sikh Youth Federation | Canada, European Union, India, Japan |
| | International Union of Muslim Scholars | Bahrain, Egypt, Saudi Arabia, United Arab Emirates |
| | Iran International | Iran |
| | Irish National Liberation Army | United Kingdom |
| | Irish People's Liberation Organisation | United Kingdom |
| | Islam4UK | United Kingdom |
| | Islamic Action Front | Argentina, United States |
| Majlis of Muslims of Ichkeria and Dagestan | Islamic International Peacekeeping Brigade | Argentina, New Zealand, United States |
| | Islamic Jihad – Jamaat Mujahideen | Japan, Russia |
| | Islamic Renaissance Party of Tajikistan | Russia, Tajikistan |
| Army of the Guardians of the Islamic Revolution | Islamic Revolutionary Guard Corps | Albania, Argentina Australia, Bahrain, Canada, Colombia, Costa Rica, Dominican Republic Ecuador, European Union, Honduras, Israel, Paraguay, Saudi Arabia, Trinidad and Tobago, Ukraine, United Kingdom, United States |
| | Islamic Revolutionary Guard Corps' Quds Force | Argentina, Bahrain, Canada, Israel, Saudi Arabia, United States |
| | Islamic State – Sinai Province | Australia, Canada, Japan, Malaysia, New Zealand, Qatar, United States |
| | Islamic State – Bengal Province | United States, Canada, Bangladesh |
| | Islamic State – Central Africa Province (Note: note the US State Department lists the two geographic branches of the group as ISIS-Democratic Republic of the Congo and ISIS-Mozambique.) | United States, Canada |
| | Jalisco New Generation Cartel | United States, Canada, Costa Rica, Argentina, El Salvador, Bolivia, Chile, Honduras, Guyana, Panama, Trinidad and Tobago, Colombia, Paraguay, Dominican Republic, Ecuador, Peru |
| Jihad | Jamaat al-Dawah ila al-Quran wal-Sunnah | United States |
| JTJ | Jama'at al-Tawhid wal-Jihad | Russia |
| Jama'at Ansar al-Sunnah | Jamaat Ansar al-Sunna | United Kingdom |
| | Jamaat Ansarullah | Russia, Tajikistan |
| | Jamaat-e-Islami | Russia |
| | Jamaat Ul-Furquan | Japan, United Kingdom |
| | Jamaat-ul-Mujahideen Bangladesh | India, Malaysia, United Kingdom, Bangladesh, Australia |
| | Jamaah Ansharusy Khalifah | Indonesia |
| Jihad | Jamaah Ansharusy Syariah | Indonesia |
| | Jamiat al-Islah al-Idzhtimai | Russia |
| | Jamiat-e Islami | Russia |
| | Jammiyathul Millathu Ibrahim | Sri Lanka |
| | Jammu Kashmir Liberation Front | India |
| Jaish al-Adl | Jaysh al-Adl | United States, New Zealand |
| | Jaysh al-Islam | United Kingdom |
| | Juárez Cartel | United States, El Salvador, Bolivia, Chile, Honduras, Guyana, Panama, Trinidad and Tobago, Colombia, Dominican Republic, Peru, Costa Rica, Ecuador, Argentina, Paraguay |
| | Jund al-Sham | Russia |
| | Jundallah | New Zealand, United States, United Kingdom |
| | Kach and Kahane Chai | Canada, Israel, Japan |
| | Kamtapur Liberation Organisation | India |
| | Kangleipak Communist Party | India |
| KYKL | Kanglei Yawol Kanna Lup | India |
| | Karen National Union | Myanmar |
| | Kastuś Kalinoŭski Regiment | Belarus |
| | Kata'ib Hezbollah | Japan, United Arab Emirates, United States |
| | Kata'ib al-Imam Ali | United States |
| | Kata'ib Sayyid ul-Shuhada | United States |
| | Khalid ibn al-Walid Army | Argentina, Canada, New Zealand |
| | Khalistan Commando Force | India |
| | Khalistan Liberation Force | India |
| | Khalistan Zindabad Force | European Union, India |
| | Khalistan Tiger Force | India |
| | Kingdom Assembly of Iran | Iran |
| | Komala–PIK | Iran |
| | Komala–CPI | Iran, Japan |
| | Komala–KTP | Iran |
| | Komi Daily | Russia |
| | Krasnoyarsk Jamaat | Russia |
| | Kurdish Hezbollah | Turkey |
| Koma Civakên Kurdistanê | Kurdistan Communities Union | Turkey |
| Kurdistan Democratic Party North | Kurdistan Democratic Party/North | Turkey |
| Partiya Demokrat a Kurdistana Îranê | Kurdistan Democratic Party–Iran | Iran |
| Partiya Demokrat a Kurdistana Îranê | Kurdistan Democratic Party | Iran |
| | Kurdistan Freedom Hawks (Note: Kurdistan Freedom Hawks is considered an alias of Kurdistan Workers' Party by Australia.) | Australia, United Kingdom, United States, European Union, Turkey |
| | Kurdistan Freedom Party | Iran |
| Kurdistan Workers Party | Kurdistan Workers' Party (Note: Kazakhstan and Kyrgyzstan list the Kurdistan Workers' Party as the Kurdistan People's Congress.) | European Union, Australia, Austria, Azerbaijan, Canada, Iran, Japan, Kazakhstan, Kyrgyzstan, New Zealand, Syria, Turkey, United Kingdom, United States |
| | Kursk People's Republic | Russia |
| | Lashkar-e-Balochistan | Pakistan |
| | La Familia Michoacana | United States, Canada, Costa Rica, El Salvador, Bolivia, Chile, Colombia, Dominican Republic, Honduras, Guyana, Panama, Paraguay, Argentina, Ecuador, Peru, Trinidad and Tobago |
| | Latin Kings | Ecuador |
| | Letzte Verteidigungswelle | Germany |
| | Liberation Tigers of Tamil Eelam | European Union, Canada, India, Malaysia, Sri Lanka, United Kingdom, United States |
| | Liwa al-Muhajireen wal-Ansar | Argentina, Canada, New Zealand |
| | Liwa Fatemiyoun | Canada United States |
| | Los Chone Killers | Ecuador, United States, Argentina, El Salvador, Bolivia, Chile, Honduras, Guyana, Panama, Trinidad and Tobago, Colombia, Paraguay, Dominican Republic, Peru, Costa Rica |
| | Los Choneros | Ecuador, United States, Argentina, Costa Rica, El Salvador, Bolivia, Chile, Honduras, Guyana, Panama, Trinidad and Tobago, Colombia, Paraguay, Dominican Republic, Peru |
| | Los Lobos | Ecuador, United States, Argentina, Costa Rica, El Salvador, Bolivia, Chile, Honduras, Guyana, Panama, Trinidad and Tobago, Colombia, Paraguay, Dominican Republic, Peru |
| | Los Huistas | United States |
| | Los Lorenzanas | United States |
| | Los Mendoza | United States |
| | Los Tiguerones | Ecuador, El Salvador, Bolivia, Chile, Honduras, Guyana, Panama, Trinidad and Tobago, Colombia, Paraguay, Dominican Republic, Peru, Costa Rica, Argentina, United States |
| | Los Viagras | United States, El Salvador, Bolivia, Chile, Honduras, Guyana, Panama, Trinidad and Tobago, Colombia, Paraguay, Dominican Republic, Peru, Costa Rica, Argentina, Ecuador |
| | Lord's Resistance Army | African Union, United States |
| LVF | Loyalist Volunteer Force | United Kingdom |
| | Luhansk People's Republic | Ukraine |
| | Macina Liberation Front | Canada |
| | Majeed Brigade | Pakistan, United States |
| | Majelis Mujahidin Indonesia | United States, Indonesia |
| Jihad | Maktab al-Khidamat | Argentina, United States, New Zealand |
| | Maniac Murder Cult | Russia, United Kingdom, Canada |
| | Maoist Communist Centre of India | India |
| | Maoist Communist Party (Turkey) | Turkey |
| | MAP | Ukraine |
| | Mara Salvatrucha | El Salvador, United States, Canada, Guatemala, Costa Rica, Honduras, Argentina, Bolivia, Chile, Colombia, Dominican Republic, Ecuador, Guyana, Panama, Paraguay, Peru, Trinidad and Tobago |
| | Maute Group | Philippines, Malaysia, New Zealand, Japan |
| | Memorial | Russia |
| | Meta Platforms | Russia |
| | Militarized Communist Party of Peru | Peru, New Zealand |
| Degar Montagnards | Montagnards Stand for Justice | Vietnam |
| | MS Group | Ukraine |
| | Mujahideen Shura Council in the Environs of Jerusalem (Note: Mujahideen Shura Council is considered an alias of Islamic State by Canada.) | Canada, United Arab Emirates, United States |
| | Muslim Brotherhood | Collective Security Treaty Organization, Bahrain, Egypt, Jordan, Libya (House of Representatives), Kazakhstan, Russia, Saudi Arabia, Tajikistan, United Arab Emirates, Ecuador, Kenya, United States, Argentina |
| Republic of Kabylia | Movement for the self-determination of Kabylie | Algeria |
| | Myanmar National Democratic Alliance Army | Myanmar |
| | National Action | United Kingdom |
| | National Council of Canadian Tamils | Sri Lanka |
| | National Democratic Front of Bodoland | India |
| | National Democratic Front of the Philippines | Philippines |
| ELN | National Liberation Army | Colombia, European Union, Canada, Japan, New Zealand, United States, Costa Rica, El Salvador, Bolivia, Chile, Honduras, Guyana, Panama, Trinidad and Tobago, Ecuador, Dominican Republic, Peru, Argentina, Paraguay |
| | National Liberation Front of Tripura | India |
| | National Liberation Movement of Ahwaz | Iran |
| | National Thowheeth Jama'ath | Sri Lanka |
| | National Socialism / White Power | Russia |
| | National Socialist Council of Nagaland | India |
| | National Unity Government of Myanmar | Myanmar |
| | Neo-JMB | Japan, Bangladesh |
| | New Tuva | Russia |
| | Network | Russia |
| | Nexta | Belarus |
| | Nordic Resistance Movement | United States |
| | Northern Brigade | Kosovo |
| | Orange Volunteers | United Kingdom |
| | Order of Nine Angles | New Zealand |
| | Organization of Iranian Kurdistan Struggle | Iran |
| Oromo Liberation Front | Oromo Liberation Army | Ethiopia |
| | Pashtun Tahaffuz Movement | Pakistan |
| | Palestine Action | United Kingdom, United States |
| | Palestinian Liberation Front | Canada, Israel, Japan, United States |
| | Palestinian Islamic Jihad | European Union, Australia, Canada, Israel, Japan, New Zealand, United Kingdom, United States |
| | Palestinian Relief Development Fund – Interpal | Israel, United States, Australia, Canada |
| | Palestinian Taliban Group | Israel |
| | Paraguayan People's Army | Paraguay, United States |
| | Party of Free Life of Kurdistan | Iran, Turkey, United States |
| | People's Anti-Fascist Front | India |
| | People's Defense Units / Syrian Democratic Forces | Turkey, Qatar |
| Hêzên Parastina Gel | People's Defence Forces | Australia, United Kingdom |
| | People's Liberation Army of Manipur | India |
| | People's Liberation Party-Front of Turkey | United Kingdom |
| Russia | People's Militia named after Minin and Pozharsky | Russia |
| | People's Mujahedin of Iran | Iran, Iraq |
| prepak | People's Revolutionary Party of Kangleipak | India |
| | People's Self-Defense | Russia |
| Palestine | Popular Forces | Palestine (Hamas Administration) |
| | Popular Front for the Liberation of Palestine | European Union, Canada, Japan, United States |
| | Popular Front for the Liberation of Palestine – General Command | European Union, Canada, Japan, United Kingdom, United States |
| | Primeiro Comando da Capital | Argentina, Paraguay, United States, El Salvador, Bolivia, Chile, Honduras, Guyana, Panama, Trinidad and Tobago, Colombia, Dominican Republic, Peru, Costa Rica, Ecuador |
| Promised Day Brigades | Promised Day Brigade | United Arab Emirates |
| | Proud Boys | Canada |
| | Provisional Irish Republican Army | United Kingdom |
| | Pussy Riot | Russia |
| | Rabita Trust | Argentina, Pakistan, United States, New Zealand |
| | Radio al-Andalus | Australia |
| | Rajah Sulaiman Movement | Argentina, New Zealand |
| | Real Irish Republican Army | New Zealand, United Kingdom, United States |
| | Red Army Faction | Germany |
| | Red Hand Commando | United Kingdom |
| | Red Hand Defenders | United Kingdom |
| | Resistencia Ancestral Mapuche | Argentina |
| | Resistência Galega | Spain |
| | Resistencia Mapuche Lafkenche | Chile |
| | Resistencia Mapuche Malleco | Chile |
| FARC-EP | Revolutionary Armed Forces of Colombia | Canada, Japan, Peru, Chile, Costa Rica, Argentina |
| FARC-EP | Revolutionary Armed Forces of Colombia Dissidents | United States, Colombia, Ecuador, El Salvador, Bolivia, Chile, Honduras, Guyana, Panama, Trinidad and Tobago, Dominican Republic, Peru, Costa Rica, Argentina, Paraguay |
| | Revolutionary Antifascist Patriotic Front | Spain |
| | Revolutionary Class Self-Defense | United States |
| | Revolutionary Nuclei | United Kingdom |
| | Revolutionary Organization 17 November | United Kingdom |
| | Revolutionary Party of Kurdistan | Turkey |
| | Revolutionary People's Liberation Party–Front | European Union, Japan, New Zealand, Turkey, United Kingdom, United States |
| | Revolutionary Struggle | United States |
| | Royal Air Force | Iran |
| | Royal Canadian Navy | Iran |
| | Royal Navy | Iran |
| Russian Empire | Russian Imperial Movement | Canada, United States United Kingdom |
| | Russian Orthodox Army | Ukraine |
| | Russian Volunteer Corps | Russia |
| | Rachad | Algeria |
| | Real Ulster Freedom Fighters | United Kingdom |
| Brigate Rosse white | Red Brigades | European Union |
| | Right Sector (Crimean branch) | Russia |
| | RSB Group | Ukraine |
| | Sadval movement | Azerbaijan |
| | Sabireen Movement | Canada, United States |
| | Samidoun | Canada, Israel, United States |
| | Saor Éire | United Kingdom |
| | Saraya al-Mukhtar | Bahrain, Egypt, Saudi Arabia, United Arab Emirates, United Kingdom |
| | Satanists | Russia |
| | Severna Brigada | Kosovo |
| | Sindhudesh Liberation Army | Pakistan |
| | Slavonic Corps | Ukraine |
| | The Saved Sect | United Kingdom |
| | Sect of Revolutionaries | United States |
| | Sharia4Belgium | Belgium |
| Sendero Luminoso | Shining Path | European Union, Canada, Japan, United States, United Kingdom, Peru, El Salvador, Bolivia, Chile, Honduras, Guyana, Panama, Trinidad and Tobago, Ecuador, Dominican Republic, Colombia, Argentina, Paraguay, Costa Rica |
| | Shura Council of Benghazi Revolutionaries | Bahrain, Egypt, Saudi Arabia, United Arab Emirates, United States |
| | Sinaloa Cartel | United States, Canada, Costa Rica, El Salvador, Bolivia, Chile, Honduras, Guyana, Panama, Trinidad and Tobago, Colombia, Paraguay, Dominican Republic, Ecuador, Peru, Argentina |
| | Sipah-e-Sahaba Pakistan | Pakistan, United Kingdom |
| | Sonnenkrieg Division | Australia, United Kingdom |
| | Special Purpose Islamic Regiment | Argentina, United States, New Zealand |
| | Students' Islamic Movement of India | India |
| | Supreme Military Majlis ul-Shura of the United Mujahideen Forces of Caucasus | Russia |
| | Tablighi Jamaat | Kazakhstan, Saudi Arabia, Tajikistan |
| | Takfir wal-Hijra | Kazakhstan, Kyrgyzstan |
| | Taliban | Argentina, Bahrain, Canada, Japan, Tajikistan, United Arab Emirates |
| | Tamil Coordinating Committee | Sri Lanka |
| TNLA | Tamil Nadu Liberation Army | India |
| | Tamil National Retrieval Troops | India |
| | Tamil Rehabilitation Organisation | United States, Sri Lanka |
| | Tamil Youth Organisation | Sri Lanka |
| | Ta'ang National Liberation Army | Myanmar |
| | Tanzim | Israel |
| | Tehreek-e-Nafaz-e-Shariat-e-Mohammadi | Pakistan, United Kingdom |
| | Terrorgram | Australia, New Zealand, United Kingdom, United States, Canada |
| | Teves Group | Philippines |
| | Tevhid-Selam (Al-Quds Army) | Turkey |
| | The Covenant, the Sword, and the Arm of the Lord | United States |
| | The Order | United States |
| | The Resistance Front | India, United States |
| South Vietnam | Third Republic of Vietnam | Vietnam |
| | Three Percenters | Canada |
| | Transnational Government of Tamil Eelam | Sri Lanka |
| | Tren de Aragua | United States Argentina, Peru, Ecuador, Trinidad and Tobago, Canada, El Salvador, Bolivia, Chile, Colombia, Dominican Republic, Honduras, Guyana, Panama, Paraguay, |
| | Tunisian Combatant Group | Argentina, New Zealand |
| MRTA | Túpac Amaru Revolutionary Movement | Peru |
| | Ulster Defence Association | United Kingdom |
| | Ulster Volunteer Force | United Kingdom |
| | Ummah Tameer-e-Nau | Argentina, New Zealand |
| | Union of Agricultural Work Committees | Israel |
| | Union of Palestinian Women's Committees | Israel |
| United Liberation Front of Asom | United Liberation Front of Assam | India |
| | United National Liberation Front | India |
| AUC | United Self-Defense Forces of Colombia | Japan |
| United States Army United States Marine Corps United States Navy United States Air Force United States Space Force United States Coast Guard | United States Armed Forces | Iran |
| United States Army United States Marine Corps United States Navy United States Air Force United States Space Force United States Coast Guard | United States Central Command | Iran |
| United States Army United States Marine Corps United States Navy United States Air Force United States Space Force United States Coast Guard | United States Department of Defense (Note: On September 5, 2025, U.S. President Donald Trump signed an Executive Order which authorizes the department to use the "Department of War" title as their secondary name of the Department. However, only an act of Congress can legally and formally change the department's name. As such, the "Department of Defense" name is currently legally their official name.) | Iran |
| | United Transitional Cabinet of Belarus | Belarus |
| | UNRWA | Israel |
| | Vanguards of Conquest (Note: Vanguards of Conquest is considered an alias of Al-Qaeda by Canada.) | Canada |
| | Việt Tân | Vietnam |
| | Viv Ansanm | United States, Dominican Republic, El Salvador, Bolivia, Chile, Honduras, Guyana, Panama, Trinidad and Tobago, Colombia, Paraguay, Costa Rica, Ecuador, Peru, Argentina |
| | Wagner Group | Estonia, France, Lithuania, Ukraine, United Kingdom, OSCE Parliamentary Assembly |
| | Weichán Auka Mapu | Chile |
| | West Papua National Liberation Army | Indonesia |
| | World Tamil Movement | Canada, Sri Lanka |
| | World Tamil Relief Fund | Sri Lanka |
| | World Uygur Youth Congress | China |
| | Yarmouk Martyrs Brigade | United States |

== Organizations formerly designated as terrorist groups by other countries ==
Below is the list of organizations that have officially been designated as terrorist in the past, by the respective parties, but have since been delisted.

| Organization | | Designators | Date |
|---|---|---|---|
| | Abu Nidal Organization | United States | 8 October 1997 – 1 June 2017 |
| | African National Congress / uMkhonto weSizwe | South Africa | 16 December 1961 – 11 February 1990 |
| | African National Congress / uMkhonto weSizwe | United States | ? – 2008 |
| | Al-Haramain Foundation United States branch | New Zealand | ? – 2014 |
| | Al-Nusra Front | United States | 15 May 2014 – 8 July 2025 |
| | Al-Nusra Front | United Nations | ? – 27 February 2026 |
| | ¡Alfaro Vive, Carajo! | Ecuador | 1984 – 1991 |
| | Armed Islamic Group of Algeria | United States | 8 October 1997 – 15 October 2010 |
| | ASALA | United States, Azerbaijan | 1975 – 1991 (dissolved) |
| | Aum Shinrikyo | European Union | ? – 18 July 2011 |
| | Aum Shinrikyo | United States | 8 October 1997 – 20 May 2022 |
| | Democratic Front for the Liberation of Palestine | United States | 10 August 1997 – 10 August 1999 |
| | Euskadi Ta Askatasuna | New Zealand | 10 February 2010 – 20 November 2024 |
| | Falange Armata | Italy | 1990s |
| | Fatah | United States | ? – 1988 |
| | Front de libération du Québec | Canada | 1 April 1963 – 1971 |
| | Guatemalan National Revolutionary Unity | Guatemala | 8 February 1982 – 29 December 1996 |
| | Guatemalan Party of Labour | Guatemala | 1960s – 1996 |
| Ejército Guerrillero de los Pobres | Guerrilla Army of the Poor | Guatemala | 19 January 1972 – 15 February 1997 |
| | Ginbot 7 | Ethiopia | ? – 2018 |
| | Hay'at Tahrir al-Sham | United Kingdom | 2017 – 21 October 2025 |
| | Hay'at Tahrir al-Sham | United States | 15 May 2014 – 8 July 2025 |
| | Hay'at Tahrir al-Sham | Canada | ? – 4 December 2025 |
| | Hay'at Tahrir al-Sham | United Nations | ? – 27 February 2026 |
| | Hay'at Tahrir al-Sham | New Zealand | 14 May 2014 – 27 February 2026 |
| | Harakat Ansar Iran | Iran | ? – 2013 (dissolved) |
| Hezbi Islami Gulbuddin | Hezb-e Islami Gulbuddin | United Kingdom | ? – December 2017 |
| | Hezbollah | Iraq | 17 November 2025 – ? |
| | Houthis | Iraq | 17 November 2025 – ? |
| | Houthis | United States | 19 January – 5 February 2021 (relisted on 16 Feb 2024) |
| | Hynniewtrep National Liberation Council | India | 16 November 2000–2011 |
| | International Sikh Youth Federation | United Kingdom | ?–March 2016 |
| | Islamic Army in Iraq | United States, Israel, Iraq, Iran | from 2003 to 2013 |
| | Jamaah Ansharut Daulah | United Kingdom | March 2015–July 2016 |
| Jamiat-e Islami | Jamiat-e-Islami | Democratic Republic of Afghanistan | ?–1992 |
| | Japanese Red Army | United States | 8 October 1997 – 8 October 2001 |
| | Kach and Kahane Chai | European Union | ?–12 July 2010 |
| | Kach and Kahane Chai | United States | 8 October 1997 – 20 May 2022 |
| Democratic Kampuchea | Khmer Rouge | United States | 8 October 1997 – 8 October 1999 |
| | Lautaro Youth Movement | Chile | 1990–1994 |
| Lehi movement | Lehi | Israel, United Kingdom | |
| | Libyan Islamic Fighting Group | United Kingdom | ?–November 2019 |
| | Libyan Islamic Fighting Group | United States | ? |
| | Manuel Rodríguez Patriotic Front | United States | 8 October 1997 – 8 October 1999 |
| | Manuel Rodríguez Patriotic Front | Chile | 1983–1999 |
| al-Qaeda in Iraq | Moroccan Islamic Combatant Group | United States | ? |
| | Muslim Brotherhood | Ba'athist Syria | 21 October 2013–2024 |
| | National Council of Resistance of Iran | United States | 15 August 2003–28 September 2012 |
| | Néstor Paz Zamora Commission | Bolivia | 1989–1990 |
| | Nuclei Armati Rivoluzionari | Italy | 1977–1981 |
| | Nuclei di Iniziativa Proletaria | European Union | ?–2007 |
| | Nuclei di Iniziativa Proletaria Rivoluzionaria | European Union | ?–2007 |
| | Nuclei Territoriali Antimperialisti | European Union | ?–2007 |
| | Oromo Liberation Front | Ethiopia | ?–2018 |
| Ogaden National Liberation Front(2) | Ogaden National Liberation Front | Ethiopia | ?–2018 |
| | Ordine Nuovo | Italy | 1956–1973 |
| | People's Mujahedin of Iran | European Union | May 2002–26 January 2009 |
| | People's Mujahedin of Iran | Canada | 24 May 2005–20 December 2012 |
| | People's Mujahedin of Iran | United Kingdom | 28 March 2001 – 24 June 2008 |
| | People's Mujahedin of Iran | United States | 8 July 1997 – 28 September 2012 |
| | Palestinian Liberation Front | United Kingdom | ?–12 July 2010 |
| | Palestine Liberation Organization | United Kingdom, United States | 1988–1991, 1987 – 1988 |
| | Prima Linea | Italy | 1976–1983 |
| | Proud Boys | New Zealand | 20 June 2022 – 17 June 2025 |
| | Revolutionary Nuclei | United States | 10 August 1997 – 18 May 2009 |
| | Revolutionary Organization 17 November | United States | ? – 3 September 2015 |
| FARC-EP | Revolutionary Armed Forces of Colombia | European Union | 2001–13 November 2017 |
| FARC-EP | Revolutionary Armed Forces of Colombia | United States | 8 October 1997 – 30 November 2021 |
| FARC-EP | Revolutionary Armed Forces of Colombia | Colombia | 1964 – 27 June 2017 |
| FARC-EP | Revolutionary Armed Forces of Colombia | New Zealand | 10 February 2010 – 2 February 2019 |
| | Shindo Renmei | Brazil | 1940s (dissolved) |
| | Taliban | Kazakhstan | March 2005 – 2023 |
| | Taliban | Kyrgyzstan | ?–2024 |
| | Taliban | Russia | 2003–2025 |
| | Taliban | United States | 2002–2015 |
| | Tehreek-e-Labbaik Pakistan | Pakistan | 2021 |
| | Tehreek-e-Nafaz-e-Shariat-e-Mohammadi | Democratic Republic of Afghanistan, Pakistan | ? |
| | Terra Lliure | Spain | 1978–1995 |
| | Tigray People's Liberation Front | Ethiopia | 2021–2023 |
| | Turkistan Islamic Party (Note: Previously as East Turkestan Islamic Movement, now delisted claiming that it does not exist anymore.) | United States | ?–2020 |
| MRTA | Túpac Amaru Revolutionary Movement | United States | 10 August 1997 – 8 October 2001 |
| | Unified Communist Party of Nepal (Maoist) | United States | ?–6 September 2012 |
| | United Baloch Army | Pakistan | ?–2022 (dissolved) |
| | United Baloch Army | Switzerland | ?–2022 (dissolved) |
| AUC | United Self-Defense Forces of Colombia | European Union | ?–18 July 2011 |
| AUC | United Self-Defense Forces of Colombia | United States | 2001–2014 |
| AUC | United Self-Defense Forces of Colombia | Colombia | 1997–15 August 2006 |
| | Zarate Willka Armed Forces of Liberation | Bolivia | 1985–1991 |

== Process of designation ==
Among the countries that publish a list of designated terrorist organizations, some have a clear established procedure for listing and delisting, and some are opaque. The Berghof Foundation argues that opaque delisting conditions reduce the incentive for the organization to abandon terrorism, while fuelling radicalism.

=== Australia ===
Since 2002, the Australian Government maintains a list of terrorist organizations under the Security Legislation Amendment (Terrorism) Act 2002. Listing, de-listing and re-listing follows a protocol that mainly involves the Australian Security Intelligence Organisation and the Attorney-General's Department.

=== Bahrain ===
The Ministry of Foreign Affairs maintains a public list of designated terrorist individuals and entities.

=== Canada ===
Since 18 December 2001, section 83.05 of the Canadian Criminal Code allows the Governor in Council to maintain a list of entities that are engaged in terrorism, facilitating it, or acting on behalf of such an entity.

A review is conducted every five years by the Minister of Public Safety to determine whether an entity should remain listed. Entities may apply for a judicial review by the Chief Justice of the Federal Court. Both ministerial and judicial reviews are published in the Canada Gazette. The list is also published on the website of Public Safety Canada.

=== China ===
In 2003, the Ministry of Public Security published a list of "East Turkestan" terrorist organizations on its website mps.gov.cn. This list was translated to English by the Embassy of China in the US.

=== European Union ===
The European Union has two lists of designated terrorist organisations that provide for different sanctions for the two groups. The first list is copied from the United Nations, and the second is an autonomous list. As of 13 January 2020, there are 21 organizations in the autonomous list.

=== India ===
Under the Unlawful Activities (Prevention) Act, the Ministry of Home Affairs maintains a list of banned organizations.

=== Iran ===
The state maintains a list of designated terror groups; it includes the US Armed Forces, CENTCOM, Iran International.

=== Israel ===
The Israeli list of "Terrorists Organizations and Unauthorized Associations" is available at the National Bureau for Counter Terror Financing of Israel.

=== Kazakhstan ===
The Government of Kazakhstan publishes a list of terrorist organizations banned by courts.

=== Kyrgyzstan ===
Kyrgyzstan maintains a consolidated list of "destructive, extremist and terrorist" organizations officially banned by courts. As of February 9, 2026, the list includes 20 organizations.

=== Malaysia ===
The Ministry of Home Affairs of Malaysia maintains a sanction list of individuals and organizations involved in terrorist activity. The list is regulated by the Anti-Money Laundering, Anti-Terrorism Financing and Proceeds From Illegal Activities Act 2001 and is complementary to the United Nations Security Council sanction lists.

=== Myanmar ===
In Myanmar (formerly Burma), the Anti-Terrorism Central Committee is responsible for designating terrorist organisations in accordance with the country's counter-terrorism law. Designations must be approved by the union government before being official. There are only two groups on Myanmar's terror list: the Arakan Rohingya Salvation Army and Arakan Army, declared on 25 August 2017 and January 2019.

=== New Zealand ===
The New Zealand Police are responsible for coordinating any requests to the Prime Minister for designation as a terrorist entity. The designation of terrorist organizations is also guided by the Terrorism Suppression Act 2002. New Zealand also abides by several United Nations resolutions dealing with counter-terrorism including UN Resolutions 1267, 1989, 2253, 1988, and 1373.

=== Pakistan ===
Government of Pakistan under section 11-B of Anti Terrorism Act can declare an organization believed to be concerned with terrorism as a Proscribed Organization or put it under surveillance. Ministry of Interior issues the formal notification of proscription of an organization. National Counter Terrorism Authority is primarily concerned with monitoring for any signs of re-emergence through intelligence coordination, once an organization is proscribed.

=== Philippines ===
The Department of Foreign Affairs publishes a list of designated terrorist organizations under the Human Security Act or the Terrorism Financing Prevention and Suppression Act of 2012.

The passage of the Anti-Terrorism Act of 2020 automatically recognized all terrorist group designations by the United Nations under Philippine law which includes the Islamic State of Iraq and the Levant (ISIL). Under the same law, the Anti-Terrorism Council was formed to designate groups as terrorists.

=== Russia ===
A single federal list of organizations recognized as terrorist is used by the Supreme Court of the Russian Federation. The National Anti-Terrorism Committee maintains a list of terrorist organizations, named "Federal United list of Terrorist Organizations".

=== Sri Lanka ===
Sri Lanka bans using the 'Prevention of Terrorism (Temporary Provisions) Act, No. 48 of 1979 regulations, cited as the Prevention of Terrorism (Proscription of Extremist Organizations).

=== Tajikistan ===
The National Bank of Tajikistan publishes national lists of individuals and organizations declared terrorist or extremists by the Supreme Court.

In 2015, the Islamic Renaissance Party of Tajikistan was banned in Tajikistan as a terrorist organization.

=== United Arab Emirates ===
The Cabinet of the United Arab Emirates periodically issues resolutions to include individuals and organizations on its terrorist list. As of 4 March 2020, issued resolutions are 2014/41, 2017/18, 2017/28, 2017/45, 2018/24 and 2018/50.

=== United Nations ===
The United Nations does not have a list of all terrorist organizations. Instead, it has several lists focusing on international sanctions in particular contexts. The United Nations Security Council Resolution 1267 established lists focused Al-Qaeda, the Taliban and their associates. The listing process was later extended to include the Islamic State of Iraq and the Levant.

=== United Kingdom ===
The Secretary of State can proscribe organisations. The United Kingdom Home Office maintains a list of proscribed groups, which also contains the proscription criteria.

=== United States ===
The United States Department of State maintains a list of Foreign Terrorist Organizations.

== See also ==
- Definition of terrorism
- List of charities accused of ties to terrorism
- List of non-state groups accused of terrorism
- List of terrorist incidents
- Religious terrorism
  - Christian terrorism
  - Islamic terrorism
  - Jewish terrorism
- Violent non-state actor
