= Turkistani =

Turkistani is a surname. Notable people with the surname include:

- Abdul Haq al-Turkistani, Uyghur Islamic militant
- Abdul Shakoor al-Turkistani, emir of the Turkistan Islamic Party
- Abu Omar al-Turkistani
- Abdul Baqi Turkistani, Afghan politician
- Sadik Ahmad Turkistani, ethnic Uyghur born and raised in Taif, Saudi Arabia and an opponent of the Taliban
