= Abdullah Mansour =

Uyghur militant and former leader of Turkistan Islamic Party

Emir of the Turkistan Islamic Party
- In office 2013–2014
- Preceded by: Abdul Shakoor al-Turkistani
- Succeeded by: Abdul Haq al-Turkistani

Military service
- Allegiance: Turkistan Islamic Party al-Qaeda
- Battles/wars: Xinjiang conflict War in Afghanistan (2001–2021); War in North-West Pakistan

Abdullah Mansour (Arabic: عبد الله منصور) is a Uyghur militant who was the leader of the Turkistan Islamic Party, an Islamic and Uyghur separatist organization. Between 2008 and 2013 Mansour was an editor of his movements quarterly publication Islamic Turkistan, before rising to its leadership.

== Biography ==
According to IntelCenter, Mansour was seen in a 2008 video, holding an assault rifle and stating: "We, members of the Turkestan Islamic Party, have declared war against China. We oppose China’s occupation of our homeland of East Turkestan, which is a part of the Islamic world." He threatened coming attacks against the 2008 Summer Olympics held in Beijing.

In an eight-minute audio clip published online by SITE Intelligence Group, Mansour claimed responsibility for the 2013 Tiananmen Square attack which killed five people and injured 38 on 28 October 2013. In the message Mansour warned of future attacks by Uyghur fighters, including one targeting the Great Hall of the People. He is quoted as having stated: "The people have learned who is the real enemy and they returned to their own religion. They learned the lesson."

In March 2014 interview with Reuters from an undisclosed location in North Waziristan, Pakistan, Mansour stated that it was his holy duty to fight China, and promised further attacks. Also in March 2014, Mansour expressed support for the 2014 Kunming attack, without claiming responsibility.

== See also ==
- Concerns and controversies at the 2008 Summer Olympics
- Terrorism in China
