= Terrorism in Central Asia =

Terrorism in Central Asia is largely a cross-border phenomenon. The source of most terrorists and terrorist organizations that operate in Central Asia is Afghanistan due to the presence of the Taliban, and more formerly, Al Qaeda militants, as well as the Ferghana Valley due to the Tajik Civil War.

== China ==
The Chinese and Kyrgyz governments increased security along their borders with each other and Tajikistan on 11 January 2007 after Chinese government officials expressed concern that "international terrorists" were traveling through Xinjiang and Central Asia to carry out attacks. The warning followed a high-profile raid on a training camp in Akto County, Xinjiang run by East Turkestan Islamic Movement members. General Sadyrbek Dubanayev, deputy chief of Kyrgyzstan's border guards, said, "After the announcement of the special operation by the Chinese side, we briefed everyone [security authorities on the Kyrgyz side] and then Kyrgyzstan and China decided to increase security along the border."

== United States Congressional testimony ==
=== Jones testimony ===
A. Elizabeth Jones, the U.S. assistant secretary of state for Europe and Eurasia, testified on the threat of terrorism in Central Asia before the U.S. House of Representatives' subcommittee on the Middle East and Central Asia on 29 October 2003. Jones said the greatest threats to the Central Asian states are the Islamic Movement of Uzbekistan, which she described as an Islamic terrorist organization, and Hizb ut-Tahrir, which praises attacks on U.S. troops in Iraq. She said that despite the death of IMU leader Juma Namangani, the "IMU is still active in the region – particularly in Kyrgyzstan, Tajikistan, Uzbekistan, and Kazakhstan – and it represents a serious threat to the region and therefore to our interests."

=== Negroponte testimony ===
John Negroponte, the United States Director of National Intelligence, testified before the Senate Intelligence Committee in an annual review of security threats on 11 January 2007 that the "repression, leadership stasis and corruption that tend to characterize these regimes [in Central Asia] provide fertile soil for the development of radical Islamic sentiment and movements, and raise the questions about the Central Asian states' reliability as energy and counterterrorism partners."

== Regional cooperation ==
The governments of Russia, Azerbaijan, Kazakhstan, Turkmenistan, and Iran participated in an anti-terrorism conference on 14 July 2005 focusing on preventing attacks against oil and natural gas pipelines in the Caspian Sea. Russian president Vladimir Putin attended.

== See also ==
- New Great Game
- Terrorism in Azerbaijan
- Islamic terrorism in Central Asia
