= 1992 Ürümqi bombings =

- Location of Ürümqi in China
- Location: Urumqi, Xinjiang, China
- Date: February 5, 1992 (UTC+08:00)
- Attack type: Bombings
- Deaths: 6
- Perpetrators: Not claimed by any group, but attributed to the East Turkestan independence movement by the Chinese government
- Motive: Xinjiang conflict

On 5 February 1992, bombs exploded on two buses in Ürümqi, killing six. The bombings were attributed at the time to the East Turkestan independence movement, but not claimed by a specific organization.

== See also ==
- Terrorism in China
- Xinjiang conflict
