= 2010 Aksu bombing =

Bombing incident in Aksu, Xinjiang, China

- Part of Xinjiang conflict
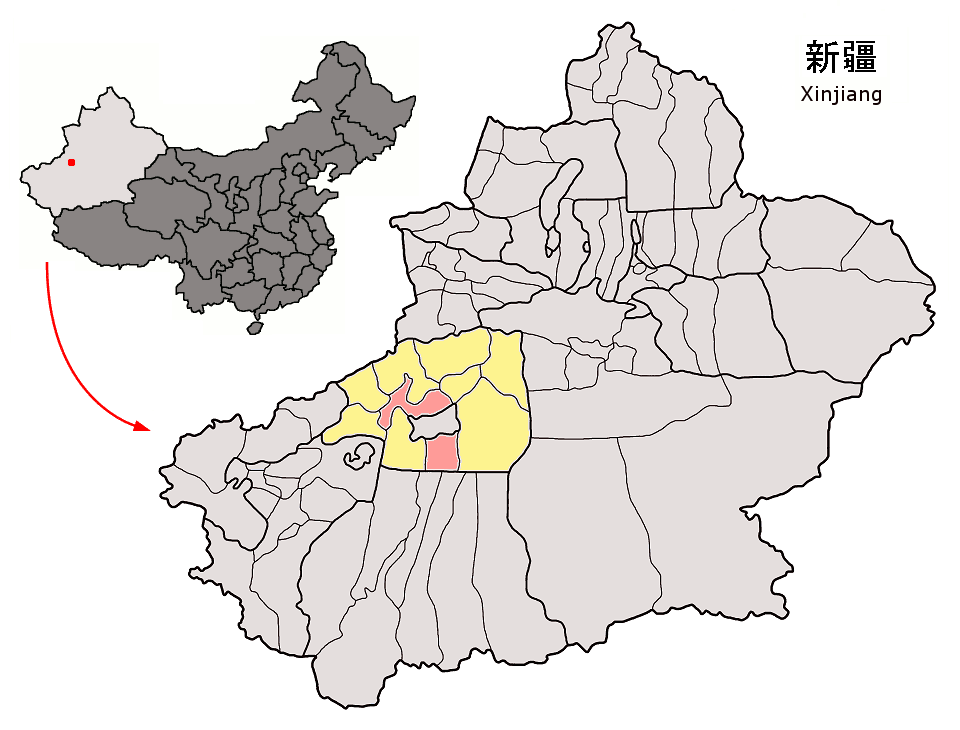
- Location: 41°10′N 80°15′E; Aksu, Xinjiang, People's Republic of China
- Date: 19 August 2010; 10:30 – (UTC+3)
- Target: Security personnel
- Attack type: Bomb
- Deaths: 7+
- Injuries: 14+

2010 Aksu bombing
- Traditional Chinese: 2010年阿克蘇爆炸襲擊事件
- Simplified Chinese: 2010年阿克苏爆炸袭击事件
Transcriptions

On 19 August 2010, a Uyghur man detonated explosives in a crowd of police and paramilitary guards in Aksu, Xinjiang, at about 10:30 using a three-wheeled vehicle. The assailant targeted police officers in the area, and most of the victims were also Uyghurs. Fourteen people were injured. Xinhua news agency reported that six people were involved in the attack, and two had died; the other four were detained by police.

== Background ==
A number of violent incidents have occurred in Xinjiang since the 1990s. In the year before the attack, Xinjiang had ethnic tensions that continued to trouble the region. Before the 2010 Aksu blast, Xinjiang Governor Nur Bekri was quoted as saying Xinjiang faces a "long and fierce and very complicated struggle" because "Separatism in Xinjiang has a very long history, it was there in the past, it is still here now and it will continue in the future."

In July 2009, riots in Ürümqi resulted in the deaths of numerous Han Chinese and Uyghurs. There was another spate of attacks in the region a few months later.

== Attack ==
The site of the explosion, Aksu (Uyghur: ئاقسۇ; Chinese: 阿克苏), is about 650 km (400 mi) west of Urumqi, and is just 60 km (37 mi) from the border with Kyrgyzstan. The bomb exploded at the T-intersection of Kalata Road (Uyghur: قالاتا يولى; Chinese: 喀拉塔路) and Wuka Road (Uyghur: ئۇكا يولى; Chinese: 乌喀路). According to a report by the Associated Press, two attackers drove a three-wheeled motorbike into a crowd and threw explosives from it. According to reports the attack was carried out by a man, who was arrested on the spot and whom Xinjiang government spokeswoman Hou Hanmin stated is Uyghur, and a woman who died during the attack.

Most of those killed in the blast were local security officers. Five victims died on the spot, and two died at the hospital; of the seven, at least five were police officers. An anonymous Radio Free Asia source claims that officers in the targeted police station had commonly booked Uyghurs with beards or traditional head coverings and brought them to the police station for political education. The ethnicity of the victims was not discussed at the news conference of Aksu prefecture, but Hou told reporters that "most of the victims are U[y]ghurs."

At the time of the conference the incident was not classified as a terrorist attack.

== Investigation ==
Chinese police stated that it was an intentional act, and that a suspect was detained at the scene after incurring injuries himself. The four detained suspects were part of a "violent gang of six people" according to Xinjiang government spokesperson Hou Hanmin.

== Internet censorship ==
According to one netizen interviewed by Radio Free Asia, mention of the bombing on internet boards, including postings containing the official version of events, have been speedily deleted from the internet in China.
