= 2013 Taiyuan attack =

CCP office bombing in Taiyuan, Shanxi, China

- Location of Taiyuan in Shanxi, China
- Location: Taiyuan, China
- Date: 6 November 2013; 7:40 (UTC+8)
- Target: Chinese Communist Party office
- Attack type: Bombing
- Deaths: 1
- Injuries: 8

A series of suspected bombs exploded outside the office of the Chinese Communist Party in Taiyuan, Shanxi, on 6 November 2013. The blast killed at least 1 and another 8 were injured. A 41-year-old Taiyuan resident, Feng Zhijun, was arrested on 8 November.

== Attack ==
At 7:40 am, six improvised explosive devices detonated outside the Communist Party's 20-story provincial headquarters. One person was killed, and eight others were injured.

== Suspect ==
41-year-old Feng Zhijun was arrested on the morning of 8 November 2013 in connection with the bombing. He confessed to setting off the explosions. Feng was a resident of Xinghualing District in Taiyuan, and is a convicted thief.

== See also ==
- 2013 Tiananmen Square attack
