= Hasan Mahsum =

Uyghur militant

- ھەسەن مەخدۇم

Emir of the Turkistan Islamic Party
- In office September 1997 – 2 October 2003
- Preceded by: Position established
- Succeeded by: Abdul Haq al-Turkistani

Personal details
- Born: 1964 Shule County, Kashgar, Xinjiang, China
- Died: 2 October 2003 (aged 38–39) South Waziristan, Pakistan
- Occupation: Militant/religious leader

Hasan Mahsum

Chinese name
- Traditional Chinese: 艾山·買合蘇木
- Simplified Chinese: 艾山·买合苏木
Transcriptions
Standard Mandarin
- Hanyu Pinyin: Àishān Mǎihésūmù

Uyghur name
- Uyghur: ھەسەن مەخسۇم; Hesen Mexsum

Hasan Mahsum (or Hassan Makhdum), also known as Abu Muhammad al-Turkistani and Ashan Sumut, was an Uyghur militant who was the leader of the Turkistan Islamic Party, an Islamic extremist group suspected of having ties with Al Qaeda. He was shot dead in a counter-terrorism operation on 2 October 2003 by the Pakistani Army.

== Political activities ==
Abdul Hameed, Abdul Azeez Makhdoom and Abdul Hakeem Makhdoom launched the Islamic Party of Turkistan in 1940. After being set free from prison in 1979, Abdul Hakeem founded a number of religious schools, including one in Karghalik, at which Hasan Mahsum studied from 1984 to 1989.

Mahsum, a native of Shule (Kunixar) County, became involved with the East Turkestan independence movement early in his life; in his late 20s, he was already a lecturer at a training camp in Yecheng County, preaching Jihad and advocating the use of violence against Chinese authorities. Mahsum reportedly took part in the Barin uprising in April 1990. He was detained by authorities in Kashgar on 8 May 1990 and was released on 23 November 1991. In July 1993, he was imprisoned again for organizing an unlawful assembly commemorating his late teacher Abdul Hakeem. In February 1995, he was transferred to a labor camp and released in April 1996. During the Chinese government “strike hard” campaigns in August 1996, Mahsum was again detained until September 1996.

After his release from prison, Mahsum traveled from Ürümqi to Beijing and finally to Jeddah, Saudi Arabia in January 1997. During his stay in Jeddah from January to March 1997, Mahsum tried to recruit members of the Uyghur community and wealthy businessmen to join his jihad against Beijing. He received little support in Jeddah. From March to April 1997, Mahsum travelled to Pakistan and from April to May 1997 he travelled to Turkey to recruit for his cause. Both trips failed to yield recruits for his cause. After the Turkey trip, Mahsum along with a small group of followers travelled to Afghanistan where he was able to network with the Islamists and jihadists.

In September 1997, Hasan Mahsum and his deputy Abudukadir Yapuquan established the East Turkistan Islamic Party (ETIP) in Pakistan. After fleeing China in 1997 to Mecca, Mahsum joined the Taliban and lived in Afghanistan and Pakistan; he held an Afghan passport issued by the Taliban. In early 1999, he was said to have met with Osama bin Laden, who offered him US$300,000 of financial assistance for the East Turkestan Islamic Movement in the following year; Mahsum himself denied any connection with bin Laden. The Chinese government has accused him of directing a series of violent terrorist activities including robbery and murder in Ürümqi on 4 February 1999 and violent murders in the Khotan region on 14 December 1999; it is believed that these attacks were carried out by an operative of his named Mutalif Kasim.

Uyghur detainees at Guantanamo Bay have confessed that they were trained by Abdul Haq and Hassan Mahsum in Afghanistan, Abdul Haq was the leader who threatened terror attacks on the 2008 Beijing Olympics, sits on the Shura Council of al-Qaeda, and subscribes to the methodology of al-Qaeda.

== Death ==
Chinese, Pakistani, and US officials confirmed that Mahsum was shot dead in an early-morning raid on a suspected al-Qaeda training camp by the Pakistan Army in South Waziristan, near the Afghan border, on 2 October 2003. The Pakistani army attacked an al-Qaeda hideout in South Waziristan near the border with Afghanistan on 2 October 2003, shooting and killing eight terrorists, including Mahsum. The Beijing News and International Herald Leader initially reported that the United States worked with Pakistan in a joint counter-terrorism operation, but Major General Shaukat Sultan, a spokesman for the Pakistani military, denied U.S. military involvement. Sultan said "DNA tests were conducted to determine it was him." The Chinese government assisted in identifying his body.
