= Nuclei Territoriali Antimperialisti =

- Ideology: Communism

The Nuclei Territoriali Antimperalisti (NTA) were an Italian radical left-wing organisation, founded in 1995 in Friuli. The NTA conducted several terrorist attacks, targeting only property. Their techniques included papering political offices with leaflets with warning of political assassinations that would be committed by their organization, none of which were carried out. The NTA claimed responsibility for burning three US Army vehicles. Their largest attacks were the bombings of the offices of the Federal Trade Institute and the Central European Initiative in Rome in 2000.

The NTA were dismantled in January 2004 when the Italian police arrested several men, Luca Razza, Giannantonio Pigat., Gianluca Cosattini. Razza asserted the NTA had never actually existed as an organization and that he was the group's sole member. The inquiries eventually focused solely on Razza and Cosattini. Razza was considered the only perpetrator of the NTA's actions, while Cosattini remained under investigation for having taught Razza how to build a bomb. In October 2007, Razza was sentenced to three years in prison and Cosattini to one year.
