= 2013 Tiananmen Square attack =

Terrorist attack in Beijing, China

2013 Tiananmen Square car attack
- Part of the Xinjiang conflict
- Location: 39°54′27″N 116°23′50″E; Beijing, China
- Date: 28 October 2013
- Attack type: Car attack (suspected suicide bombing)
- Deaths: 5 (including three attackers)
- Injuries: 38
- Perpetrator: East Turkestan Islamic Movement
- Motive: Islamic extremism

On 28 October 2013, a car ran over pedestrians and crashed in Tiananmen Square, Beijing, China, in a terrorist suicide attack. Five people died in the incident; three inside the vehicle and two others nearby. Police identified the driver as Usmen Hasan and the two passengers as his wife, Gulkiz Gini, and his mother, Kuwanhan Reyim. An additional 38 people were injured.

Chinese police described it as a "major incident" and as the first terrorist attack in Beijing's recent history. The East Turkestan Islamic Movement, or Turkistan Islamic Party, claimed responsibility and warned of future attacks.

== Incident ==
A 4×4 vehicle crashed into a crowd and burst into flames near the portrait of Mao Zedong at Tiananmen Square. Two tourists, identified as a woman from the Philippines and a male Chinese citizen from Guangdong, were killed during the attack. All three people inside the car were also killed. Thirty-eight other people were injured. Witnesses at the scene said that the driver involved in the incident was honking his horn at pedestrians.

== Investigation ==
Chinese police later issued a notice to Beijing hotels seeking information about two people from China's Xinjiang Uyghur Autonomous Region. The notice described a vehicle and four Xinjiang number plates. They also instructed hotels to be aware of "suspicious" guests.

The police notice also required hotels to report all guests who had registered since 1 October, and the cars they had driven. The request was issued "In order to prevent the suspects and vehicles from committing more crimes".

Five people were later arrested by Chinese police, all being Uyghurs, a Turkic Muslim minority group, who hailed from their native Xinjiang, a region in which there is ongoing conflict. One suspect was from the town of Lukun in Shanshan County, the location of an attack in June 2013 in which 30 people were killed. The five suspects were taken into police custody, and said they knew Hasan. Three of the suspects, identified as Huseyin Guxur, Yusup Wherniyas and Yusup Ehmet, were convicted of masterminding the attack, and executed in August 2014.

Top Chinese security official Meng Jianzhu said that the East Turkestan Islamic Movement (ETIM) was behind the attacks, but Uyghur exile groups and some Western observers disputed the claim. On 24 November 2013, the Turkistan Islamic Party, which has since been absorbed by the ETIM, declared it was responsible for the attack.

== Reaction ==
A BBC camera crew was briefly detained by police after taking footage of the attack. Coverage in the Chinese state media largely downplayed the incident, with only brief reports. Although such associations were made in English-language media, Chinese-language publications did not link the incident to Xinjiang. Chinese internet users also reposted and spread photographs of the incident.

Six days after the attack, General Peng Yong, commander of the Xinjiang Military District, was removed from the Regional Party Standing Committee, the Communist Party governing body in Xinjiang, and replaced by Liu Lei, political commissar of the Xinjiang MD.

Then–United States State Department spokesperson Jen Psaki said America supported China's investigation into the matter but declined to call it a terrorist attack and reiterated American support for Uyghur human rights.

== See also ==
- 2013 Taiyuan attack
- List of massacres in China
