= Radio Tibet =

- Type: Public radio network
- Country: Tibet
- Founded: 18 October 1939; 86 years ago
- Radio stations: AC4RF
- Headquarters: Lhasa, Tibet
- Dissolved: 24 October 1951; 74 years ago (12 years and 6 days)
- Language: English • Tibetan

Radio Tibet was the public broadcaster within Tibet from October 1934 until 1951. The company was formed on 18 October 1939 by the Government of Tibet within its capital Lhasa, initially conceived for personal use under the purpose of political or military communication. Licensed by the Government of Tibet, with help from Robert Ford–who became the station's first official Officer of Radio as insisted by the Tibetan government–its original office was located on the second floor of Magnet House, a GEC building in London, and consisted of a room and a small antechamber, the station identification was broadcast primarily through audio rather than visuals, opening and closing its shortwave transmissions by announcing its location from the capital city of Lhasa. Following the incorporation, and extreme annexation, of Tibet into the People's Republic of China in 1951, the early setup was eventually reorganized into what is known today as China Tibet Broadcasting (CTB), established in 1959 with its own modern Chinese state-registered broadcast logos.
