= 2007 Xinjiang raid =

Chinese military operation during the Xinjiang conflict

Xinjiang raid
- Part of the Xinjiang conflict
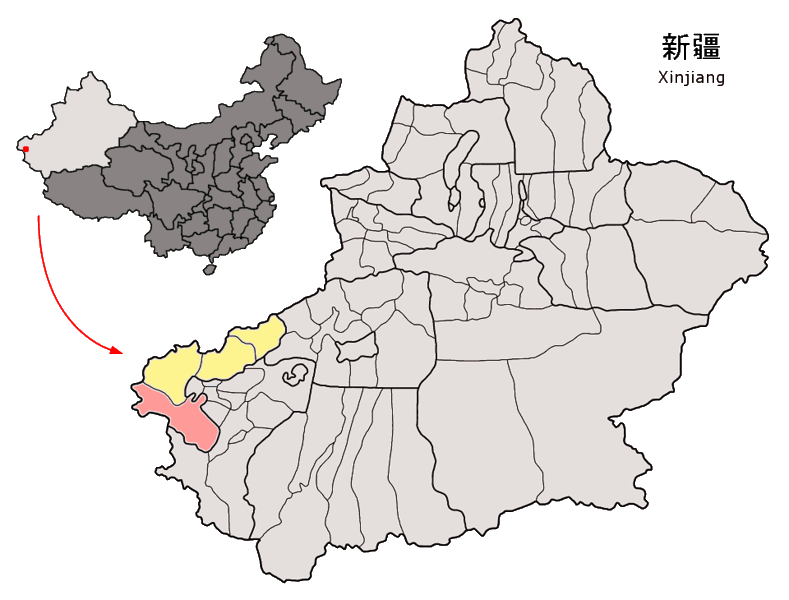
- Location of Akto County in Xinjiang, China
Date	January 5, 2007
Location	Xinjiang, People's Republic of China
Result	Chinese victory

Belligerents
People's Republic of China: People's Armed Police	East Turkestan Islamic Movement

Commanders and leaders
Ba Yan	Unknown

Casualties and losses
1 killed 1 wounded	18 killed 17 captured

On January 5, 2007, Chinese paramilitary police raided a suspected East Turkestan Islamic Movement (ETIM) training camp in Akto County in the Pamir plateau.

A spokesperson for the Xinjiang Public Security Department said that 18 terror suspects were killed and 17 captured. Those captured were either sentenced to death or life imprisonment. The raid also resulted in the death of one Chinese paramilitary officer, Huang Qiang, age 21, and the injury of another officer. Authorities confiscated hand grenades, guns, and makeshift explosives from the site. ETIM is classified by the United Nations as a terrorist organization.

In reaction, many exiled Uyghur leaders quickly questioned the motives behind the raid. Rebiya Kadeer, a Uyghur human rights activist, called for an independent UN investigation into the raid, while Alim Seytoff, executive chairman of the World Uighur Congress, claimed the Chinese government has yet to produce evidence to substantiate the camp's connections to terrorism. In response, Zhao Yongchen, vice head of the Xinjiang counterterrorism forces, reiterated the reality of the camp's terrorist threat.

== See also ==
- East Turkestan independence movement
- East Turkestan Liberation Organization
- 2008 Uyghur unrest
- Politics of the People's Republic of China
