= Chung Chien-peng =

Hong Kong political scientist

Chung Chien-peng (traditional Chinese: 鍾健平; simplified Chinese: 钟健平) is a Singaporean political scientist. He is currently a professor at the Department of Government and International Affairs of Lingnan University.

Born and raised in Singapore, Chung received a Bachelor of Arts with a major in economics from the University of Calgary and a Master of Arts in economics from the University of Toronto. He then received a Master of Arts and a Doctor of Philosophy in political science from the University of Southern California in the United States.

== Selected publications ==
- Chung, Chien-peng (2012) [2004]. Domestic Politics, International Bargaining and China's Territorial Disputes. Routledge. ISBN 9780415647267.Alternative URL
- Chung, Chien-peng (2010). China's Multilateral Co-operation in Asia and the Pacific: Institutionalizing Beijing's 'Good Neighbour Policy'. Routledge. ISBN 9780415690355.
- Chung, Chien-peng (2014). Contentious Integration: Post-Cold War Japan-China Relations in the Asia-Pacific. Routledge. ISBN 9781472419989. Alternative URL
