= Rabita Trust =

Pakistani terrorist organisation

Rabita Trust is a designated terrorist organisation in Pakistan, which ostensibly provided humanitarian aid to Pakistanis in Bangladesh and Afghanistan. The trust has extensive ties to both the Pakistani and Saudi Arabian governments.

Pakistani President Muhammad Zia-ul-Haq founded the trust in 1988. Wa'el Hamza Julaidan is the Secretary-General.

The United States State Department designated Rabita Trust as an al-Qaeda terrorist financing front on 23 September 2001. The Pakistani government designated Rabita Trust as a terrorist organisation on 6 March 2012.

== See also ==
- Muslim World League
- The Golden Chain
