= Abdul Shakoor al-Turkistani =

East Turkestan Islamic Movement leader

Emir of the Turkistan Islamic Party
- In office 2010 – 24 August 2012
- Preceded by: Abdul Haq al-Turkistani
- Succeeded by: Abdullah Mansour

Personal details
- Born: 24 January 1965 China
- Died: 24 August 2012 (aged 47) North Waziristan, Pakistan

Military service
- Allegiance: Turkistan Islamic Party al-Qaeda
- Battles/wars: Xinjiang conflict War in Afghanistan (2001–2021); War in North-West Pakistan

Abdul Shakoor al-Turkistani (Arabic: عبد الشکور التركستاني), also known as Abdul Shakoor Damla and Emeti Yakuf (Uyghur: ئەخمەت ياقۇپ, romanized: Exmet Yaqup), was the emir of the East Turkistan Islamic Party, an Islamist organisation that seeks independence for China's Xinjiang province and for it to become an Islamic state. In August 2011, Abdul Shakoor reportedly appeared in a video with his face obscured taking responsibility for the 2011 Kashgar attacks and 2011 Hotan attack.

Abdul Shakoor reportedly took command of al Qaeda forces in the Federally Administered Tribal Areas in April 2011 after Saif al-Adel left the region, according to the jihadist newspaper Karachi Islam.

Abdul Shakoor was killed in North Waziristan in a CIA drone strike on 24 August 2012.
