= Abdul Haq al-Turkistani =

Uyghur terrorist leader

Emir of the Turkistan Islamic Party
- Incumbent
- Assumed office 2014
- Preceded by: Abdullah Mansour
- In office 2003–2010
- Preceded by: Hasan Mahsum
- Succeeded by: Abdul Shakoor al-Turkistani

Personal details
- Born: 10 October 1971 (age 55) Hotan Prefecture, Xinjiang, China

Military service
- Allegiance: Turkistan Islamic Party al-Qaeda
- Battles/wars: Xinjiang conflict War in Afghanistan (2001–2021); War in North-West Pakistan

Memtimin Memet (Uyghur: مۇھەممەتئىمىن مەمەت, born 10 October 1971), also known in his nom de guerre Abdul Haq al-Turkistani (Arabic: عبد الحق التركستاني), is a Uyghur Islamic militant who leads the Turkistan Islamic Party. The United States Treasury reported he took over leadership of the organization in 2003, following the death of its previous leader, and took a seat on al-Qaeda's shura (central committee) in 2005.

== Biography ==
In October 2008, Chinese security officials published half a dozen of his aliases. They reported that he left China in March 1998 and became a training officer at a camp in a "South Asian country".

Uyghur detainees at Guantanamo Bay "confessed" that they were trained by Abdul Haq and Hassan Mahsum in Afghanistan. Haq threatened terrorist attacks on the 2008 Beijing Olympics. Al-Qaeda's command viewed Abdul Haq as authoritative and sent him to meet with Taliban factions along with al-Qaeda commanders.

Abdul Haq faced allegations from the US Treasury Department that he was behind a bombing that preceded the Beijing Olympics.

On 1 March 2010, Abdul Haq was reported to have been killed by a missile launched from an unmanned drone on 15 February 2010. It took place in North Waziristan's area of Mir Ali in Zor Babar Aidak town. However, in June 2014, it was reported that Abdul Haq was instead severely wounded, but recovered and resumed leadership in 2014.

On 6 December 2024, amidst the Syrian opposition offensives, Abdul Haq al-Turkistani released a statement saying "while the Muslims are celebrating these victories in every place, the Muslims of oppressed East Turkistan remain far removed from the news of them as they live under a filthy oppressive, disbelieving occupation that suppresses them by every means possible". He called for attack inside China, stating "through God's support, the Chinese disbelievers will soon taste the same torment that the disbelievers in al-Sham have tasted, if God wills".
