= East Turkestan Information Center =

Political organization based in Germany

- Formation: 1996
- Founder: Abdujelil Karakash
- Type: NGO
- Headquarters: Munich, Germany
- Region served: East Turkestan
- President: Abdujelil Karakash
- Affiliations: East Turkestan independence movement
- Staff: 70
- Website: http://uygurtv.dyndns.org/

The East Turkestan Information Center (شەرقىي تۈركىستان ئىنفورماتسىيون, шәрқий түркистан информатсийон, Sherqiy Türkistan Informatsiyon; abbreviated ETIC) is a group affiliated with the East Turkestan independence movement. It was founded in Munich, Germany in 1996, and has an office in Washington, D.C.

The ETIC publishes reports on alleged human rights violations and abuses by the Chinese government towards China's ethnic Uyghur population.

On December 15, 2003, the ETIC was designated as a terrorist organization by the Ministry of Public Security of the People's Republic of China, which Oxford Analytica says could be an excuse for repression of the Uyghur population.
