= Turkistan Islamic Party =

Islamic military organization in China and Syria

- تۈركىستان ئىسلام پارتىيىسى
- Leaders: Hasan Mahsum † (1997–2003); Abdul Haq al-Turkistani (2003–2010); Abdul Shakoor al-Turkistani † (2010–2012); Abdullah Mansour (2013–2014); Abdul Haq al-Turkistani (2014–)
- Governing body: Shura Council
- Dates active: 1997–present
- Allegiance: Taliban (until 2014)
- Group: Turkistan Islamic Party in Syria (2011–2025)
- Headquarters: Badakshan, Afghanistan
- Active regions: China (Xinjiang); Pakistan (North Waziristan, until 2017); Afghanistan (Badakhshan, until 2021); Central Asia; Syria (Idlib & Latakia Governorates, 2011–2025); Indonesia; (2014–2016)
- Ideology: Sunni Islamism; Islamic fundamentalism; Uyghur nationalism; Turkestani nationalism; Separatism; Anti-Chinese sentiment; Anti-communism
- Size: 1,000 in Afghanistan (2022 UN report); 4,000 in Syria
- Wars: Xinjiang conflict (1997–present); War in Afghanistan (2001–2021); Insurgency in Khyber Pakhtunkhwa; Syrian civil war; Islamic State–Taliban conflict; Operation Madago Raya

Turkistan Islamic Party

Chinese name
- Simplified Chinese: 突厥斯坦伊斯兰党
- Traditional Chinese: 突厥斯坦伊斯蘭黨
Transcriptions
Standard Mandarin
- Hanyu Pinyin: Tūjuésītǎn Yīsīlán Dǎng

Uyghur name
- Uyghur: تۈركىستان ئىسلام پارتىيىسى
Transcriptions
- Latin Yëziqi: Türkistan Islam Partiyisi

The Turkistan Islamic Party (TIP) (Note: Arabic: الحزب الإسلامي التركستاني, romanized: al-Ḥizb al-Islāmī al-Turkistānī; Uyghur: تۈركىستان ئىسلام پارتىيىسى, romanized: Türkistan Islam Partiyisi; Chinese: 突厥斯坦伊斯兰党; pinyin: Tūjuésītǎn yīsīlán dǎng) is an Islamic militant organisation founded in Pakistan by Hasan Mahsum, who relocated the organization to Afghanistan following anti-terror crackdowns by the Pakistani government. Its stated goal is to establish an Islamic state in Xinjiang, China (i.e. East Turkestan), and throughout the rest of Central Asia.

The Chinese government asserts that the TIP is synonymous with the East Turkestan Islamic Movement (ETIM). ETIM has been described by scholars as demanding the total independence of Xinjiang and supporting or being indifferent to more radical methods driven by religious and ethnic motives.

Influenced by the success of the Afghan mujahideen against the Soviet Union in the Soviet–Afghan War, Mahsum established the ETIP (which changed its name to the TIP in 2001) in September 1997. After the September 11 attacks, the Chinese government strove to include the removal of Uyghur Islamic extremist networks in the international effort against terrorism. The TIP's slogans contain anti-communist rhetoric and calls for the unity of Turkic peoples, portending, at least rhetorically, a movement akin to pan-Turkism historically congruent with Southern Xinjiang rather than pure, radical Salafi jihadism or religious extremism. The Chinese government views the group as a jihadist movement akin to the mujahideen in Afghanistan across the border, which inspired groups like ETIM.

The Syrian branch of the TIP was active in the Syrian civil war and were largely grouped in Idlib. The Syrian branch dissolved following the fall of Bashar al-Assad's regime and was incorporated into the newly formed Ministry of Defense.

== History ==
=== Earlier groups ===
Abdul Hameed (Abduhamit), Abdul Azeez Makhdoom (Abliz Mehsum) and Abdul Hakeem Makhdoom (Ablikim Mehsum) launched the Hizbul Islam Li-Turkestan (Islamic Party of Turkistan or Turkistan Islamic Movement) in 1940. During the 1940s through 1952, the three led the movement in a series of uprisings against local warlords and later against the Chinese Communists. They were killed, imprisoned or driven underground by China by the late 1950s.

In 1956, after the death of Abdul Hameed, the group reformed as Hizbul Islam Li-Turkistan Ash-Sharqiyah (Islamic Party of East Turkistan or East Turkistan Islamic Party) under the new leadership of Mullah Baquee and Mullah Muhammad. The organization led a failed uprising, leading to a decline of the organization and its activity until the late 1970s or early 1980s. After being set free from prison in 1979, Abdul Hakeem Makhdoom instructed Muhammad Amin Jan and other Uyghurs in his version of Islam.

With the death Hizbul Islam Li-Turkistan Ash-Sharqiyah founder Abdul Hakeem in 1993, the movement was briefly reborn under the leadership of Hotan natives Abdurahman and Memet Tohti.

=== Founding ===
The East Turkistan Islamic Party (ETIP) was organised in Pakistan by Hasan Mahsum and Abudukadir Yapuquan in September 1997. In 1998, Mahsum moved the ETIP (which China claims is ETIM)'s headquarters to Kabul, taking shelter under Taliban-controlled Afghanistan. The leader, Hasan Mahsum, was killed by a Pakistani raid on a suspected Al-Qaeda camp in South Waziristan in 2003, leading to the group's collapse.

However, ETIP resurged after the Iraq War inflamed mujaheddin sentiment. The group was mentioned again in 2007, when China announced it raided its militants in Akto County. ETIM received material support from the Taliban and had links to the Pakistani Taliban (Tehreek i Taliban Pakistan), prompting China to urge Pakistan to take action against the militants in 2009.

=== From ETIP to TIP ===
The new organization called itself the Turkistan Islamic Party (TIP) to reflect its new domain and abandoned usage of the name ETIP, although China still calls it by the name ETIM.

The Turkistan Islamic Party was originally subordinated to the Islamic Movement of Uzbekistan (IMU) but then split off and declared its name as TIP and started making itself known by promoting itself with its Islamic Turkistan magazine and Voice of Islam media in Chinese, Arabic, Russian, and Turkish in order to reach out to global jihadists. Control over the Uyghur and Uzbek militants was transferred to the Pakistani Taliban from the Afghan Taliban after 2001, so violence against the militant's countries of origins can no longer restrained by the Afghan Taliban since the Pakistani Taliban does not have a stake in doing so.

In 2013, the group announced it was moving fighters to Syria, its profile in China and even Afghanistan and Pakistan has decisively waned since then, while in Syria it has risen.

In March 2025, the group announced it was returning to its former name of the East Turkistan Islamic Party (ETIP).

=== Al-Qaeda links ===
The TIP has links to al-Qaeda and affiliated groups such as the Islamic Movement of Uzbekistan, and the Pakistani Taliban. The US has designated it as having received "training and financial assistance" from al-Qaeda.

University of Virginia associate professor Philip B. K. Potter wrote in 2013 that, even though "throughout the 1990s, Chinese authorities went to great lengths to publicly link organizations active in Xinjiang—particularly the ETIM—to al-Qaeda [...] the best information indicates that before 2001, the relationship included some training and funding but relatively little operational cooperation." Meanwhile, specific incidents were downplayed by Chinese authorities as isolated criminal acts. In 1998, the group's headquarters were moved to Kabul, in Taliban-controlled Afghanistan, while "China's ongoing security crackdown in Xinjiang has forced the most militant Uyghur separatists into volatile neighboring countries, such as Pakistan," Potter writes, "where they are forging strategic alliances with, and even leading, jihadist factions affiliated with al-Qaeda and the Taliban."

However, according to the US Treasury, TIP member Abdul Haq al-Turkistani joined al-Qaeda's Majlis-ash-Shura (executive leadership council) in 2005 and TIP member Abdul Shakoor Turkistani was appointed military commander of its forces in the Federally Administered Tribal Areas of Pakistan. Abdul Haq was considered sufficiently influential by the al-Qaeda leadership that he served as a mediator between rival Taliban factions and played a role in military planning.

In the mid-2010s, TIP's relationship to al-Qaeda was still contested but they became more closely aligned and TIP leader head Abdul Haq confirmed loyalty to al-Qaeda in May 2016. In 2014, according to the SITE Intelligence Group, the al-Qaeda aligned al-Fajr Media Center began to distribute TIP promotional material, placing it in the "jihadist mainstream".

The East Turkestan independence movement was endorsed in the serial Islamic Spring's 9th release by Ayman Al-Zawahiri in 2016. Zawahiri confirmed that the Afghanistan war after 9/11 included the participation of Uighurs and that the jihadists like Zarwaqi, Bin Ladin and the Uighur Hasan Mahsum were provided with refuge together in Afghanistan under Taliban rule. This was before the Bishkek Chinese Embassy Bombing. The Turkistan Islamic Party slammed and attacked Assad, Russia, NATO, the United States and other western countries in its propaganda outlets such as the Islamic Turkestan magazine and its Telegram channel.

=== ISIS-K links ===
According to the Atlantic Council, ISIS-K has actively recruited TIP members by expanding their Uyghur-language propaganda and giving economic incentives to join their group, as well as offering encouragement to attack Chinese targets. Reportedly in January 2025, ISIS-K and TIP carried out a joint attack to kill a Chinese national at a mine in Afghanistan, with ISIS-K taking official responsibility for the attack.

=== Afghanistan and Waziristan ===
In February 2018, airstrikes were conducted by American forces in Afghanistan's Badakhshan province against training camps belonging to the Taliban and the Turkistan Islamic Party.

Speaking with Pentagon reporters, US Air Force Maj. Gen. James B. Hecker, commander of NATO Air Command Afghanistan was quoted "The destruction of these training facilities prevents terrorists from planning any acts near the border with China and Tajikistan. The strikes also destroyed stolen Afghan National Army vehicles in the process of being converted to vehicle-borne improvised explosive devices. ETIM enjoys support from the Taliban in the mountains of Badakhshan, so hitting these Taliban training facilities and squeezing the Taliban's support networks degrades ETIM capabilities."

After the 2021 Taliban takeover of Afghanistan, TIP was removed from Badakhshan, as the new Afghan government seeks aid from China.

=== Syria ===
TIP (ETIM) sent the "Turkistan Brigade" (Katibat Turkistani), also known as the Turkistan Islamic Party in Syria to take part in the Syrian Civil War as part of a network of al-Qaeda linked groups alongside al-Nusra, most notably in the 2015 Jisr al-Shughur offensive where they were part of the Army of Conquest coalition. They have been described as well organized, experienced and as having an important role in offensives against President Bashar al-Assad's forces in Syria's northern regions. On 29 January 2025, after the fall of Bashar al-Assad's regime, most factions of the armed opposition including the Turkistan Islamic Party in Syria announced their dissolution and were incorporated into the newly formed Ministry of Defense. Fighters from the Turkistan Islamic Party participated in the 2025 massacres of Syrian Alawites.

== Ideology ==
The group is staunchly Uyghur nationalist. The NEFA Foundation, an American terrorist analyst foundation, translated and released a jihad article from ETIM, whose membership it said consisted primarily of "Uyghur Muslims from Western China." The TIP's primary goal is the independence of East Turkestan.

ETIM continues this theme of contrasting "Muslims" and "Chinese", in a six-minute video in 2008, where "Commander Seyfullah" warns Muslims not to bring their children to the 2008 Summer Olympics, and also saying "do not stay on the same bus, on the same train, on the same plane, in the same buildings, or any place the Chinese are".

== Structure ==
TIP is led by Abdul Haq al-Turkistani, who's the group's Emir and leader of the Shura Council. The council also includes a Deputy Emir, and the heads of at least three groups: Religious Education Division, Military Affairs Division and Information Center. There have also been reports of an Intelligence Division and a Logistics Division.

=== Media ===
In 2008, TIP's Ṣawt al-Islām (Voice of Islam) media arm was created and began releasing video messages. The full name of their media center is "Turkistan Islamic Party Voice of Islam Media Center" (Uyghur: تۈركىستان ئىسلام پارتىيىسى ئىسلام ئاۋازى تەشۋىقات مەركىزى, romanized: Türkistan Islam Partiyisi Islam Awazi Teshwiqat Merkizi).

=== Members ===
In October 2008, the Chinese Ministry of Public Security released a list of eight terrorists linked to ETIM, including some of the leadership, with detailed charges. They are:

Name	Aliases	Charges	Whereabouts
Memetimin Memet (Memetiming Memeti)	Abdul Haq	Leading the organization, inciting ethnic tensions in 2006 and 2007, buying explosives, organizing terrorist attacks against the 2008 Summer Olympics	Thought to have been killed in North Waziristan drone attack Resurfaced in 2014
Emeti Yakuf (Ehmet Yakup)	Abu Abdurehman, Sayfullah, Abdul Jabar	Threatening to use biological and chemical weapons against servicepeople and Western politicians for the 2008 Olympics, disseminating manuals on explosives and poisons	Killed in North Waziristan drone attack
Memetituersun Yiming (Memet Tursun Imin)	Abdul Ali	Raised funds for ETIM, tested bombs in the run-up to the Olympics	Since 2008, Western Asia
Memetituersun Abuduhalike (Memet Tursun Abduxaliq)	Metursun Abduxaliq, Ansarul, Najmuddin	Attacked government organizations, money laundering for ETIM operations, buying vehicles and renting houses for attacks	Unknown
Xiamisidingaihemaiti Abudumijiti (Shamseden ehmet Abdumijit)	Sayyid	Recruiting for ETIM in the Middle East, blew up a Chinese supermarket	Unknown
Aikemilai Wumaierjiang (Akrem Omerjan)		Assisted Xiamisidingaihemaiti Abudumijiti in the supermarket attack	Unknown
Yakuf Memeti (Yakup Memet)	Abdujalil Ahmet, Abdullah, Punjab	Sneaked into China illegally to gather information on Chinese neighborhoods, a failed suicide attack against oil refinery	Killed in North Waziristan drone attack
Tuersun Toheti (Tursun Tohti)	Mubather, Nurullah	Organizing a terror team for the 2008 Olympics, buying raw materials for them and requesting chemical formulas for explosives	Killed in North Waziristan drone attack

== Guantanamo Bay detainees ==
The United States captured 22 Uyghur militants from combat zones in Afghanistan in 2006 on information that they were linked to Al-Qaeda. They were imprisoned without trial for five to seven years, where they testified that they were trained by ETIM leader Abdul Haq, at an ETIM training camp. After being found No Longer Enemy Combatant, a panel of judges ordered them released into the United States.

Despite the alarm of politicians that the release of embittered former Guantanamo detainees into the United States was unsafe and illegal, the Obama administration did not want to release them back to China as they were wanted on charges that included arson and illegal manufacture of explosives. ABC News opined that "It is believed that if the United States returned the men to China, they could be tortured."

== Attacks and incidents ==
- Between 1990 and 2001, Chinese government has attributed many different Uyghur groups including ETIP, after 1997, to over 200 acts of terrorism, which claimed 800 lives and over 440 injured. However, in many Chinese official statements "east Turkestan terrorist forces" are referred to rather than any specific group.
- Between 1992 and 1998, four imams of mosques in Xinjiang were assassinated by different East Turkistan groups.
- In 2007, ETIP militants in cars shot Chinese nationals in Pakistani Balochistan, which Pakistani authorities believed to be in retaliation for an execution of an ETIM official earlier that July.
- ETIM also took credit for a spate of attacks before the 2008 Summer Olympics, including a series of bus bombings in Kunming, an attempted plane hijacking in Urumqi, and an attack on paramilitary troops in Kashgar that killed 17 officers.
- On 29 June 2010, a court in Dubai convicted two members of an ETIM cell for plotting to bomb a government-owned shopping mall that sold Chinese goods. This was the first ETIM plot outside of China or Central Asia. The key plotter was recruited during Hajj and was flown to Waziristan for training.
- In July 2010, officials in Norway interrupted a terrorist bomb plot; one perpetrator was Uyghur, leading to speculation about TIP involvement. New York Times correspondent Edward Wong says that ETIM "give[s] them a raison d'être at a time when the Chinese government has... defused any chance of a widespread insurgency... in Xinjiang."
- Several attacks in 2011 in Xinjiang were claimed by the Turkistan Islamic Party.
- In October 2013, a suicide attack in Tiananmen Square caused 5 deaths and 38 injuries. Chinese police described it as the first terrorist attack in Beijing's recent history. Turkistan Islamic Party later claimed responsibility for the attack.
- In March 2014, a knife-armed group attacked passengers at the Kunming's railway station, resulting in 31 civilians dead and +140 injured. No group claimed responsibility. Chinese authorities and state media stated that the attack had been linked to TIP, while other sources were skeptical of this claim.
- Between July and December 2014, a series of riots, bombings, arson and knife attacks in Xinjiang which led to the deaths over 183 people (including civilians, attackers and security forces) and left dozens injured. Chinese authorities attributed attacks to "gangs" and "terrorists".
- Assassination of Juma Tayir, a government-appointed Imam in Id Kah mosque was attributed to by the Chinese government to TIP-inspired militants.
- On 18 September 2015 in Aksu, a group of knife-wielding terrorists attacked sleeping workers at a coalmine and killed 16 of them. The Turkistan Islamic Party claimed responsibility for the attack.
- On 30 August 2016, the Chinese Embassy in Kyrgyzstan was targeted in a suicide bombing which left Kyrgyz staffers injured; the attack was later attributed by Kyrgyzstan's state security service to TIP.
- On 14 February 2017, attackers killed 5 people in Pishan county before killed by police. Chinese authorities stated that the attackers were affiliated with TIP.
- On 14 July 2021, an attack killed 13 people, including 9 Chinese engineers who were working on the Dasu Dam in Kohistan, Pakistan. Asia Times reported that a "joint China-Pakistan investigation" showed ETIM and TTP colluded in the attack, but Reuters and Al Jazeera reported that Pakistan blamed the TTP, with support from Afghan and Indian intelligence services, without mentioning ETIM. The claims were denied by both the Indian government and TTP.

== Terrorist designation ==
Countries designating the ETIM/TIP as a terrorist organization

Since the September 11 attacks, the group has been designated as a terrorist organization by the following countries and international organizations:

- United Nations
- European Union
- Argentina
- China
- Japan
- Kazakhstan
- Kyrgyzstan (Note: The Eastern Turkistan Islamic Party, Organization for Freeing Eastern Turkistan and the Islamic Party of Turkistan were outlawed by Kyrgyzstan's Lenin District Court and its Supreme Court in November 2003)
- Malaysia
- New Zealand
- Pakistan
- Russia
- Turkey
- United Arab Emirates
- United Kingdom

Former:

- United States (until 2020): The ETIM was formerly classified as a terrorist organization under Title 8 of the United States Code Section 1189 by the United States from 2002 to 2020. The United States Department of the Treasury confiscated the organization's property and prohibited transactions with it according to Executive Order 13224, while the State Department blocked its members from entering the country. The US revoked that classification for the ETIM in October 2020 on the basis that "there has been no credible evidence that ETIM continues to exist." The U.S. State Department however continues to view the Turkistan Islamic Party (TIP) as a terrorist organization. A State Department Spokesperson told Newsweek that "Uyghur terrorists fighting in Syria and Afghanistan are members of the Turkistan Islamic Party (TIP)," and that is "a separate organization that China and others have incorrectly identified as ETIM." China accused the US of double standards as it dropped ETIM from its terrorism list, while the US contends that the label has been broadly misused to oppress Muslims in Xinjiang.

== Analysis ==
In 2009, Dru C. Gladney, an authority on research on ethnic and cultural nationalism in Asia, said that there was "a credibility gap" about the group since the majority of information on ETIM "was traced back to Chinese sources", and that some believe ETIM to be part of a US-China quid pro quo, where China supported the US-led war on terror, and "support of the US for the condemnation of ETIM was connected to that support." The Uyghur American Association has publicly doubted the ETIM's existence.

Andrew McGregor, writing for the Jamestown Foundation in 2010, noted that "though there is no question a small group of Uyghur militants fought alongside their Taliban hosts against the Northern Alliance [...] the scores of terrorists Beijing claimed that Bin Laden was sending to China in 2002 never materialized" and that "the TIP's 'strategy' of making loud and alarming threats (attacks on the Olympics, use of biological and chemical weapons, etc.) without any operational follow-up has been enormously effective in promoting China's efforts to characterize Uyghur separatists as terrorists."

On 16 June 2009, US Representative Bill Delahunt convened hearings to examine how organizations were added to the US blacklist in general, and how the ETIM was added in particular. Uyghur expert Sean Roberts testified that the ETIM was new to him, that it wasn't until it was blacklisted that he heard of the group, and claimed that "it is perfectly reasonable to assume that the organization no longer exists at all." The Congressional Research Service reported that the first published mention of the group was in the year 2000, but that China attributed attacks to it that had occurred up to a decade earlier.

Stratfor has noted repeated unexplained attacks on Chinese buses in 2008 have followed a history of ETIM targeting Chinese infrastructure, and noted the group's splintering and subsequent reorganization following the death of Mahsum.

In 2010, intelligence analysts J. Todd Reed and Diana Raschke acknowledge that reporting in China presents obstacles not found in countries where information is not so tightly controlled. However, they found that ETIM's existence and activities could be confirmed independently of Chinese government sources, using information gleaned from ETIM's now-defunct website, reports from human rights groups and academics, and testimony from the Uyghur detainees at Guantanamo Bay. Reed & Raschke also question the information put out by Uyghur expatriates that deny ETIM's existence or impact, as the Uyghurs who leave Xinjiang are those who object most to government policy, are unable to provide first-hand analysis, and have an incentive to exaggerate repression and downplay militancy. They say that ETIM was "obscure but not unknown" before the September 11 attacks, citing "Western, Russian, and Chinese media sources" that have "documented the ETIM's existence for nearly 20 years".

In 2010, Raffaello Pantucci of Jamestown Foundation wrote about the convictions of two men linked to an ETIM cell in Dubai with a plot to attack a shopping mall.

Nick Holdstock, in a 2015 New York Times interview, said that no organization is taking responsibility for attacks in Xinjiang, and that there is not enough proof to blame any organization for the attacks, that most "terrorism" there is "unsubstantiated", and that posting internet videos online is the only thing done by the "vague and shadowy" ETIM.

In 2016, David Volodzko wrote that the Al-Qaeda allied Uyghur Turkistan Islamic Party members were fighting in Syria, and refuted and disproved the claims that Uyghurs were not in Syria made by "The Sydney Morning Herald", the Daily Mail, and Bernstein's article in the New York Review of Books.

Muhanad Hage Ali wrote on Uyghur Turkistan Islamic Party jihadists in Syria for Al Arabiya.

In 2019, Uran Botobekov from ModernDiplomat has written about the Turkistan Islamic Party along with other Central-Asian jihadist groups in a report titled Think like Jihadist: Anatomy of Central Asian Salafi groups.

== See also ==
- Terrorism in China
- 2007 Xinjiang raid
- Islamic Movement of Uzbekistan
