= East Turkestan Liberation Organization =

Uyghur secessionist organization

- Leader: Mehmet Emin Hazret
- Dates active: 1997–2003
- Active regions: Xinjiang
- Ideology: Uyghur nationalism, Separatism, Islamism, Turanism
- Status: (China) Designated as a terrorist organization (15 December 2003) (Kazakhstan) Designated as a terrorist organization (November 2006) (Kyrgyzstan) Designated as a terrorist organization (September 2007)

East Turkestan Liberation Organization

Chinese name
- Traditional Chinese: 東突厥斯坦解放組織
- Simplified Chinese: 东突厥斯坦解放组织
Transcriptions
Standard Mandarin
- Hanyu Pinyin: Dōng Tūjuésītǎn Jiěfàng Zǔzhī

Uyghur name
- Uyghur: شارقىي تۇركەستان ئازاتلىق تەشكىلاتى
Transcriptions
- Latin Yëziqi: Şärqiy Türkestan Azatliq Teşkilati
- Siril Yëziqi: Шәрқий Түркестан Азатлиқ Тешкилати

The East Turkestan Liberation Organization (ETLO) was a secessionist Uyghur organization that advocated for an independent Uyghur state named East Turkestan in the Western Chinese province known as Xinjiang.

ETLO has been described by scholars as demanding total independence and supporting or being indifferent to more radical methods driven by religious and ethnic motives. ETLO is a designated terrorist organization by the governments of China, Kazakhstan, and Kyrgyzstan.

== History ==
The organization was established in Turkey in late 1997 to fight against the Chinese government in Xinjiang Uygur Autonomous Region.

In 1998, ETLO members were accused by the government of China of organizing 15 arson incidents in Ürümqi, and in 1999, Istanbul police arrested 10 ETLO members for a series of attacks on Chinese people in Turkey.

Since 9/11, 2001, China has effectively used the international climate to build an international coalition against Uyghur separatist movements.

In a 2002 Chinese documentary, "On the Spot Report: The Crimes of Eastern Turkestan Terrorist Power," Wang Mingshan, Deputy Director-General of the Yili-Kazak Autonomous Prefecture Public Security Department, claimed that in 1998 Mehmet Emin Hazret, the leader of the ETLO, ordered Hamid Mehmetjan, an Egyptian ETLO member, to go to China to recruit members, receive a delivery of weapons on 6 April, and to compile a list of targets for assassination and bombings in Xinjiang. Mingshan also claimed that police and ETLO members exchanged gunfire on 24 April 1998, and that members later stated during interrogation that they were trained at camps in Afghanistan.

On 15 December 2003, the Chinese Ministry of Public Security issued a list of East Turkestan terrorists and terrorist organizations which named four organizations and several individuals: the East Turkestan Liberation Organization (ETLO), the East Turkestan Islamic Movement (ETIM), the World Uyghur Youth Congress (WUYC) and the East Turkestan Information Centre (ETIC). At the same time, the official Chinese press initiated a campaign detailing terrorist incidents allegedly carried out by the individuals listed. Amnesty International regarded these allegations "uncorroborated and no credible evidence was provided to substantiate these claims. Indeed, much of the "evidence" appeared to have been obtained from other individuals under interrogation. In view of the ongoing and widespread use of torture and ill-treatment by police in China, particularly to extract confessions from detained suspects, Amnesty International believes any "evidence" obtained in this way must be treated with deep suspicion." In January, Hazret, who avoids public appearances, called into Radio Free Asia to respond that ETLO wishes to work by peaceful means, but spoke of the "inevitability" of a military wing targeting the Chinese government. He also stated that the principal goal of the ETLO was to pursue independence through peaceful means, and denied any participation in terrorist activities or connections to the East Turkestan Islamic Movement. Amnesty International has criticized the Chinese government response to ETLO, which it says include human rights violations, such as torture and ill-treatment by police.

== Designation as a terrorist organization ==
The Shanghai Cooperation Organisation (SCO) members of China, Kazakhstan, and Kyrgyzstan, respectively, have designated ETLO as a terrorist organization. According to Amnesty International, the listing of ETIM and ETLO was in keeping with previous allegations made by China against these groups. Both were highlighted in China's official report on East Turkestan terrorists of January 2002.

The organization operates primarily in Xinjiang, China, but also throughout Central Asia and in Pakistan. The ETLO is allied with the East Turkestan Islamic Movement and the Taliban. Kazakhstan banned the ETLO, designating it a terrorist organization, on 17 November 2006. The United States State Department says the ETLO has engaged "small politically-motivated bombings and armed attacks". Al-Qaeda are alleged to give funding and training to the ETLO and the East Turkestan Islamic Movement.

== See also ==
- East Turkestan independence movement
- East Turkestan Islamic Movement
- 2008 Uyghur unrest
