= PRIO Director's Shortlist =

List of Nobel Peace Prize candidates

The Peace Research Institute Oslo (PRIO) Director's Shortlist is a list of candidates considered worthy to win the Nobel Peace Prize for their efforts and actions for the promotion of peace. It has been prepared by the director of the Peace Research Institute Oslo since 2002, and is a list of the most worthy potential Nobel laureates based on independent research and assessments.

From 2014 to 2025, 10 of the speculated candidates were eventually awarded: Malala Yousafzai (2014), Juan Manuel Santos (2016), Denis Mukwege and Nadia Murad (2018), Abiy Ahmed (2019), World Food Programme (2020), Dmitry Muratov (2021), Memorial (2022), Narges Mohammadi (2023) and Nihon Hidankyo (2024). The United Nations High Commissioner for Refugees (UNHCR) and Médecins Sans Frontières who are already Nobel laureates were speculated of possibly earning their third and second award respectively.

== List of shortlisted candidates ==
Names of recipients of the Prize are shown in Bold

PRIO Director		Tenure	
		**Kristian Berg Harpviken**; Born: 27 December 1961 (aged 64) in Lillehammer, Norway; Director, Peace Research Institute Oslo: 1 July 2009 – 30 June 2017; Director, Norwegian Nobel Institute: 2 January 2025 – present	
Year	Shortlisted Candidates	Citizenship/ Headquarters	Motivations
2014
2014	**Malala Yousafzai** (born 1997)	Pakistan	"for her outspoken support for the education of girls."
2014	Chelsea Manning (born 1987)	United States	"for leaking the largest amount of classified information in U.S. history."
2014	Edward Snowden (born 1983)	United States	"for leaking the largest amount of classified information in U.S. history."
2014	Pope Francis (born 1936)	Vatican City	"for having brought attention to the fate of the poor, and the need for a new approach to development and economic redistribution."
2014	Novaya Gazeta (founded in 1993)	Moscow	"for continuing to challenge political developments in Russia and its immediate neighbourhood, despite the loss of several journalists in violent attacks."
2014	**Denis Mukwege** (born 1955)	Democratic Republic of Congo	"for giving medical treatment to survivors of sexual violence in Congo."
2015
2015	Angela Merkel (born 1954)	Germany	"for staking out a more humane course in the European response to the mounting number of refugees."
2015	Mussie Zerai (born 1975)	Eritrea	"for his work with asylum seekers & refugees crossing the Mediterranean Sea from North Africa to Europe during the European Asylum seekers crisis."
2015	**Juan Manuel Santos** (born 1951)	Colombia	"for their commitment to a peace process that carries strong promise of bringing the Colombian conflict to an end."
2015	Timoleón Jiménez (born 1959)	Colombia	"for their commitment to a peace process that carries strong promise of bringing the Colombian conflict to an end."
2015	Federica Mogherini (born 1973)	Italy	"for the establishment of a nuclear peace deal between Iran and the P5+1."
2015	Mohammad Javad Zarif (born 1960)	Iran	"for the establishment of a nuclear peace deal between Iran and the P5+1."
2015	Novaya Gazeta (founded in 1993)	Moscow	"for continuing to challenge political developments in Russia and its immediate neighbourhood, despite the loss of several journalists in violent attacks."
2015	**Dmitry Muratov** (born 1961)	Russia	"for continuing to challenge political developments in Russia and its immediate neighbourhood, despite the loss of several journalists in violent attacks."
2015	Echo of Moscow (founded in 1990)	Moscow	"for continuing to challenge political developments in Russia and its immediate neighbourhood, despite the loss of several journalists in violent attacks."
2015	TV Rain (founded in 2008)	Moscow	"for continuing to challenge political developments in Russia and its immediate neighbourhood, despite the loss of several journalists in violent attacks."
2015	Article 9 Association (founded in 2004)	Tokyo	"for working to preserve Article 9 in the Japanese constitution, which renounces Japan's right to engage in war or to maintain military forces capable of engaging in war."
2015	**Nihon Hidankyo** (founded in 1956)	Tokyo	"for spearheading a civil society campaign to bring international attention to the threatened constitutional clause."
2015	Naomi Takasu (born ?)	Japan	"for spearheading a civil society campaign to bring international attention to the threatened constitutional clause."
2015	Jeanne Nacatche Banyere (born ?)	Democratic Republic of Congo	"for their long-standing engagement and struggle against sexual violence in Congo."
2015	Jeannette Kahindo Bindu (born ?)	Democratic Republic of Congo	"for their long-standing engagement and struggle against sexual violence in Congo."
2015	**Denis Mukwege** (born 1955)	Democratic Republic of Congo	"for their long-standing engagement and struggle against sexual violence in Congo."
2015	Zainab Bangura (born 1959)	Sierra Leone	"for their invaluable efforts in defending women's rights, fighting against sexual and domestic violence, and rescuing forcibly displaced or abducted women."
2015	Butterflies (founded in 2014)	Colombia	"for their invaluable efforts in defending women's rights, fighting against sexual and domestic violence, and rescuing forcibly displaced or abducted women."
2016
2016	Svetlana Gannushkina (born 1942)	Russia	"for her remarkable contributions to upholding the rights of migrants – including refugees and asylum-seekers – in Russia, as well as for justice and reconciliation."
2016	Ernest Moniz (born 1944)	United States	"for their significant achievement in multilateral diplomacy and dialogue that will positively contribute to regional and international peace and security"
2016	Ali Akbar Salehi (born 1949)	Iran	"for their significant achievement in multilateral diplomacy and dialogue that will positively contribute to regional and international peace and security"
2016	White Helmets (founded in 2013)	Syria	"for saving lives, ameliorating human suffering, and maintaining a ray of hope in Syria's all-encompassing war."
2016	Edward Snowden (born 1983)	United States	"in recognition of his status as a whistle-blower and international human rights defender."
2016	Jeanne Nacatche Banyere (born ?)	Democratic Republic of Congo	"for their long-standing engagement and struggle against sexual violence in Congo"
2016	Jeannette Kahindo Bindu (born ?)	Democratic Republic of Congo	"for their long-standing engagement and struggle against sexual violence in Congo"
2016	**Denis Mukwege** (born 1955)	Democratic Republic of Congo	"for their long-standing engagement and struggle against sexual violence in Congo"
-
PRIO Director		Tenure	
		**Henrik Urdal**; Born: 19 October 1972 (aged 54) in Oslo, Norway; Director, Peace Research Institute Oslo: 1 July 2017 – 30 June 2025	
Year	Shortlisted Candidates	Citizenship/ Headquarters	Motivations
2017
2017	Mohammad Javad Zarif (born 1960)	Iran	"for achieving a peaceful and successful resolution on the Iran nuclear dispute through the Joint Comprehensive Plan of Action."
2017	Federica Mogherini (born 1973)	Italy	"for achieving a peaceful and successful resolution on the Iran nuclear dispute through the Joint Comprehensive Plan of Action."
2017	**United Nations High Commissioner for Refugees** (UNHCR) (founded in 1950)	Geneva	"for standing up for refugees' rights and working tirelessly to mend the consequences of war in major conflict areas like Syria, Afghanistan and South Sudan"
2017	Filippo Grandi (born 1957)	Italy	"for standing up for refugees' rights and working tirelessly to mend the consequences of war in major conflict areas like Syria, Afghanistan and South Sudan"
2017	Cumhuriyet (founded in 1924)	Istanbul	"for their impartial reporting and fearlessness in criticizing the authorities and in standing against mounting government pressure"
2017	Can Dündar (born 1961)	Istanbul	"for their impartial reporting and fearlessness in criticizing the authorities and in standing against mounting government pressure"
2017	Economic Community of West African States (ECOWAS) (founded in 1975)	Abuja	"for their success in combining diplomatic efforts with the prospective use of armed force and securing the political transition in Gambia"
2017	White Helmets (founded in 2013)	Syria	"for their work saving lives, ameliorating human suffering, and maintaining a ray of hope in the Syrian civil war"
2017	Raed Al Saleh (born 1983)	Syria	"for their work saving lives, ameliorating human suffering, and maintaining a ray of hope in the Syrian civil war"
2018
2018	**World Food Programme** (WFP) (founded in 1961)	Rome	"for the crucial work the organization is doing for populations fleeing from conflict, while also ensuring continued commitment from its funders to keep up their endeavours to make sure victims of conflict, displacement and natural disasters are fed and cared for."
2018	**Denis Mukwege** (born 1955)	Democratic Republic of Congo	"for their global advocacy of bringing attention sexual abuse and violence in armed conflict as a tactic of war and a war crime."
2018	**Nadia Murad** (born 1993)	Iraq	"for their global advocacy of bringing attention sexual abuse and violence in armed conflict as a tactic of war and a war crime."
2018	Tarana Burke (born 1973)	United States	"for their global advocacy of bringing attention sexual abuse and violence in armed conflict as a tactic of war and a war crime."
2018	SOS Méditerranée (founded in 2015)	France	"for their advocacy for migrant rights, reporting relentlessly on the dangerous conditions in the Mediterranean and highlighting the desperate need for more assistance."
2018	**Médecins Sans Frontières** (MSF) (founded in 1971)	Geneva	"for their advocacy for migrant rights, reporting relentlessly on the dangerous conditions in the Mediterranean and highlighting the desperate need for more assistance."
2018	International Rescue Committee (IRC) (founded in 1933)	New York City	"for their work to provide emergency health care and reproductive services to an increasingly vulnerable and growing migrant population, including those in detention centers."
2018	Oby Ezekwesili (born 1963)	Nigeria	"for their efforts in making the world more transparent and less corrupt politically and economically."
2018	Extractive Industries Transparency Initiative (IETI) (founded in 2003)	Oslo	"for their efforts in making the world more transparent and less corrupt politically and economically."
2018	Reporters Without Borders (RSF) (founded in 1985)	Paris	"for preserving media freedom and freedom of expression by protecting journalists from injustices and threats."
2018	Can Dündar (born 1961)	Turkey	"for their independent reporting and fearlessness in criticizing the authorities against mounting government pressure."
2018	Cumhuriyet (founded in 1924)	Istanbul	"for their independent reporting and fearlessness in criticizing the authorities against mounting government pressure."
2019
2019	Hajer Sharief (born 1994)	Libya	"in recognition for the important and positive contribution of youth in efforts for the maintenance and promotion of peace and security."
2019	United Network of Young Peacebuilders (UNOY) (founded in 1989)	The Hague	"in recognition for the important and positive contribution of youth in efforts for the maintenance and promotion of peace and security."
2019	Ilwad Elman (born 1989)	Somalia	"in recognition for the important and positive contribution of youth in efforts for the maintenance and promotion of peace and security."
2019	Nathan Law (born 1993)	Hong Kong	"in recognition for the important and positive contribution of youth in efforts for the maintenance and promotion of peace and security."
2019	Agnes Chow (born 1996)	Hong Kong	"in recognition for the important and positive contribution of youth in efforts for the maintenance and promotion of peace and security."
2019	Joshua Wong (born 1996)	Hong Kong	"in recognition for the important and positive contribution of youth in efforts for the maintenance and promotion of peace and security."
2019	Reporters Without Borders (RSF)	Paris	"for preserving media freedom and freedom of expression by protecting journalists from injustices and threats."
2019	Committee to Protect Journalists (CPJ) (founded in 1981)	New York City	"for preserving media freedom and freedom of expression by protecting journalists from injustices and threats."
2019	Wa Lone (born 1986)	Myanmar	"for their courageous efforts in for documenting the government's atrocities against the Rohingya in Myanmar."
2019	Kyaw Soe Oo (born ?)	Myanmar	"for their courageous efforts in for documenting the government's atrocities against the Rohingya in Myanmar."
2019	Can Dündar (born 1961)	Turkey	"for its independent reporting and fearlessness in criticizing the authorities against mounting government pressure."
2019	Cumhuriyet (founded in 1924)	Istanbul	"for its independent reporting and fearlessness in criticizing the authorities against mounting government pressure."
2019	Control Arms Coalition	New York City	"for its campaigns for a strong international arms control regime as a means to combat violence, poverty, and human rights abuses."
2019	International Action Network on Small Arms (IANSA) (founded in 1998)	New York City	"for its campaigns for a strong international arms control regime as a means to combat violence, poverty, and human rights abuses."
2019	International Physicians for the Prevention of Nuclear War (IPPNW) (founded in 1980)	Boston	"for its campaigns for a strong international arms control regime as a means to combat violence, poverty, and human rights abuses."
2019	Quaker United Nations Office (QUNO) (founded in 1948)	Geneva	"for its campaigns for a strong international arms control regime as a means to combat violence, poverty, and human rights abuses."
2019	Adele Kirsten (born ?)	South Africa	"for their pioneering leadership in the arms control movement and global gun control."
2019	Edward J. Laurance (born ?)	United States	"for their pioneering leadership in the arms control movement and global gun control."
2019	International Rescue Committee (IRC) (founded in 1933)	New York City	"for their significant work in Libya, where they are one of relatively few organizations providing emergency healthcare to refugees and other migrants in recent years."
2019	**World Food Programme** (WFP) (founded in 1961)	Rome	"for their effort to feed displaced populations across several continents."
2019	SOS Méditerranée (founded in 2015)	Geneva	"for cooperating to run the Aquarius, one of the few ships still running rescue operations in the Mediterranean."
2019	**Médecins Sans Frontières** (founded in 1971)	Geneva	"for cooperating to run the Aquarius, one of the few ships still running rescue operations in the Mediterranean."
2019	**United Nations High Commissioner for Refugees** (UNHCR) (founded in 1950)	Geneva	"for its capacity and integrity in standing up for refugees' rights and needs time and time again, most recently in Syria, Afghanistan and South Sudan."
2019	Filippo Grandi (founded in 1957)	Italy	"for speaking out for the Rohingyas in the Rakhine province in Myanmar, urging the de facto head of state in Myanmar, Aung San Suu Kyi, to act on the situation."
2019	**Abiy Ahmed** (born 1976)	Ethiopia	"for taking steps to formally resolve the Eritrean-Ethiopian War through a peace agreement."
2019	Isaias Afwerki (born 1946)	Eritrea	"for taking steps to formally resolve the Eritrean-Ethiopian War through a peace agreement."
2020
2020	Committee to Protect Journalists (CPJ) (founded in 1981)	New York City	"for its advocacy for protecting journalists in providing reliable information within areas of conflict around the world.
2020	Reporters Without Borders (RSF) (founded in 1985)	Paris	"for its advocacy for protecting journalists in providing reliable information within areas of conflict around the world.
2020	Novaya Gazeta (founded in 1993)	Moscow	"for its relentless efforts to uncover corruption and human rights abuses in Russia, despite strong attempts at intimidation."
2020	Wa Lone (born 1986)	Myanmar	"for their courageous efforts in for documenting the government's atrocities against the Rohingya in Myanmar."
2020	Kyaw Soe Oo (born ?)	Myanmar	"for their courageous efforts in for documenting the government's atrocities against the Rohingya in Myanmar."
2020	Alaa Salah (born 1997)	Sudan	"for their efforts to unite diverse civil society actors in a nonviolent struggle for democracy and inclusive peace process."
2020	Forces of Freedom and Change (FFC) (founded in 2019)	Khartoum	"for their efforts to unite diverse civil society actors in a nonviolent struggle for democracy and inclusive peace process."
2020	Abdalla Hamdok (born 1956)	Sudan	"in recognition of the broad political cooperation that brought change to Sudan."
2020	Sudanese Professionals Association (SPA) (founded in 2016)	Khartoum	"in recognition of the broad political cooperation that brought change to Sudan."
2020	Alexei Navalny (1976–2024)	Russia	"for their ongoing struggle for peaceful change of government in authoritarian Russia and investigating high-ranking government officials suspected of corruption."
2020	Anti-Corruption Foundation (ACF) (founded in 2011)	Moscow	"for their ongoing struggle for peaceful change of government in authoritarian Russia and investigating high-ranking government officials suspected of corruption."
2020	**Memorial** (founded in 1989)	Moscow	"for their ongoing struggle for peaceful change of government in authoritarian Russia and investigating high-ranking government officials suspected of corruption."
2020	Russia Behind Bars (founded in 2008)	Moscow	"for their ongoing struggle for peaceful change of government in authoritarian Russia and investigating high-ranking government officials suspected of corruption."
2020	Olga Romanova (born 1966)	Russia	"for their ongoing struggle for peaceful change of government in authoritarian Russia and investigating high-ranking government officials suspected of corruption."
2020	Ilham Tohti (born 1969)	China	"for actively campaigning against the repression of the Uyghurs in China."
2020	Jewher Ilham (born 1995)	China	"for actively campaigning against the repression of the Uyghurs in China."
2020	Nathan Law (born 1993)	Hong Kong	"for their peaceful efforts to bring political reform and self-determination to Hong Kong."
2020	Agnes Chow (born 1996)	Hong Kong	"for their peaceful efforts to bring political reform and self-determination to Hong Kong."
2020	Joshua Wong (born 1996)	Hong Kong	"for their peaceful efforts to bring political reform and self-determination to Hong Kong."
2020	Hajer Sharief (born 1994)	Libya	"in recognition for their particular prominence in leading the way as youth peacebuilders, both globally and locally."
2020	Ilwad Elman (born 1989)	Somalia	"in recognition for their particular prominence in leading the way as youth peacebuilders, both globally and locally."
2021
2021	Reporters Without Borders (RSF)	Paris	"in recognition of the importance of independent reporting and press freedom in the face of the dire risks under which reporters all over the world, and providing information from the most devastating conflicts and repressive regimes."
2021	International Fact-Checking Network (IFCN) (founded in 2015)	St. Petersburg, Florida	"in recognition of the importance of independent reporting and press freedom in the face of the dire risks under which reporters all over the world, and providing information from the most devastating conflicts and repressive regimes."
2021	Committee to Protect Journalists (CPJ) (founded in 1981)	New York City	"in recognition of the importance of independent reporting and press freedom in the face of the dire risks under which reporters all over the world, and providing information from the most devastating conflicts and repressive regimes."
2021	Sviatlana Tsikhanouskaya (born 1982)	Belarus	"for their leading role in non-violently challenging Lukashenko and the Belarusian authorities, calling both for fair elections and an end to violence against those demonstrating against the abuses of the current regime."
2021	Maria Kalesnikava (born 1982)	Belarus	"for their leading role in non-violently challenging Lukashenko and the Belarusian authorities, calling both for fair elections and an end to violence against those demonstrating against the abuses of the current regime."
2021	Veronika Tsepkalo (born 1976)	Belarus	"for their leading role in non-violently challenging Lukashenko and the Belarusian authorities, calling both for fair elections and an end to violence against those demonstrating against the abuses of the current regime."
2021	United Nations Framework Convention on Climate Change (UNFCCC) (founded in 1992)	United Nations	"for their invaluable contribution to building fraternity among nations in the face of a pressing global threat."
2021	Patricia Espinosa (born 1958)	Mexico	"for their invaluable contribution to building fraternity among nations in the face of a pressing global threat."
2021	B'Tselem (founded in 1989)	Israel	"for their work on documenting and disseminating information about human rights abuses in occupied Palestinian territory, contributing to raising awareness in Israel and elsewhere of the need for the Israeli regime to change course if the conflict is to have any chance of reaching a peaceful and just resolution."
2021	Palestinian Center for Human Rights (PCHR) (founded in 1995)	Palestina	"for their work on documenting and disseminating information about human rights abuses in occupied Palestinian territory, contributing to raising awareness in Israel and elsewhere of the need for the Israeli regime to change course if the conflict is to have any chance of reaching a peaceful and just resolution."
2021	Ilham Tohti (born 1969)	China	"for actively campaigning against the repression of the Uyghurs in China."
2021	Jewher Ilham (born 1995)	China	"for actively campaigning against the repression of the Uyghurs in China."
2021	Nathan Law (born 1993)	Hong Kong	"for their peaceful efforts to bring political reform and self-determination to Hong Kong."
2021	Agnes Chow (born 1996)	Hong Kong	"for their peaceful efforts to bring political reform and self-determination to Hong Kong."
2021	Joshua Wong (born 1996)	Hong Kong	"for their peaceful efforts to bring political reform and self-determination to Hong Kong."
2022
2022	Sviatlana Tsikhanouskaya (born 1982)	Belarus	"for their non-violent pro-democracy activism and protest movements in overturning despotic regimes."
2022	Alexei Navalny (1976–2024)	Russia	"for their non-violent pro-democracy activism and protest movements in overturning despotic regimes."
2022	International Court of Justice (ICJ) (founded in 1945)	The Hague	"for promoting peace through international law and for peaceful resolution of conflicts between states in an increasingly polarized world."
2022	International Criminal Court (ICC) (founded in 2002)	The Hague	"for promoting peace through international law and for peaceful resolution of conflicts between states in an increasingly polarized world."
2022	European Court of Human Rights (ECtHR) (founded in 1959)	Strasbourg	"for promoting peace through international law and for peaceful resolution of conflicts between states in an increasingly polarized world."
2022	Inter-American Court of Human Rights (IACHR) (founded in 1979)	San José, Costa Rica	"for promoting peace through international law and for peaceful resolution of conflicts between states in an increasingly polarized world."
2022	Harsh Mander (born 1955)	India	"for making a significant contribution to fighting religious extremism and promoting interreligious dialogue."
2022	Karwan-e-Mohabbat (founded in 2017)	India	"for making a significant contribution to fighting religious extremism and promoting interreligious dialogue."
2022	Mohammed Zubair (born 1983)	India	"for making significant contributions to debunking misinformation aimed at vilifying Muslims in India."
2022	Pratik Sinha (born ?)	India	"for making significant contributions to debunking misinformation aimed at vilifying Muslims in India."
2022	Alt News (founded in 2017)	India	"for making significant contributions to debunking misinformation aimed at vilifying Muslims in India."
2022	Ilham Tohti (born 1969)	China	"for making an invaluable effort to raise awareness and campaign for an end to the repression of the Uyghur population"
2022	Nathan Law (born 1993)	Hong Kong	"for their peaceful efforts to bring political reform and self-determination to Hong Kong"
2022	Agnes Chow (born 1996)	Hong Kong	"for their peaceful efforts to bring political reform and self-determination to Hong Kong"
2022	Human Rights Data Analysis Group (HRDAG) (founded in 1991)	San Francisco	"for working to mobilize research and education in the service of preventing violence and conflict would highlight the importance of truth-seeking and factfulness in the face of the propagation of divisive disinformation and harmful myths"
2022	Centre for Applied Nonviolent Action and Strategies (CANVAS) (founded in 2004)	Belgrade	"for working to mobilize research and education in the service of preventing violence and conflict would highlight the importance of truth-seeking and factfulness in the face of the propagation of divisive disinformation and harmful myths"
2023
2023	**Narges Mohammadi** (born 1972)	Iran	"for their tireless efforts to improve women's rights in Iran and Afghanistan."
2023	Mahbouba Seraj (born 1948)	Afghanistan	"for their tireless efforts to improve women's rights in Iran and Afghanistan."
2023	Kyaw Moe Tun (born 1969)	Myanmar	"for their efforts to inclusively work for peace and democracy, and to end the violence by the security forces in Myanmar."
2023	National Unity Consultative Council (NUCC) (founded in 2021)	Myanmar	"for their efforts to inclusively work for peace and democracy, and to end the violence by the security forces in Myanmar."
2023	International Court of Justice (ICJ) (founded in 1945)	The Hague	"for promoting international law and establishing peaceful resolutions of conflicts between states."
2023	Victoria Tauli-Corpuz (born 1952)	Philippines	"for their non-violent struggle to protect and strengthen the rights of indigenous peoples."
2023	Juan Carlos Jintiach (born ?)	Ecuador	"for their non-violent struggle to protect and strengthen the rights of indigenous peoples."
2023	Human Rights Data Analysis Group (HRDAG) (founded in 1991)	San Francisco	"for their work to mobilize research and education in the service of preventing conflict in the face of the propagation of divisive disinformation."
2024
2024	Office for Democratic Institutions and Human Rights (ODIHR) (founded in 1991)	Warsaw	"for their contribution to strengthening democracy through elections, ensuring that elections are free and fair."
2024	The Carter Center (founded 1982)	Atlanta	"for their contribution to strengthening democracy through elections, ensuring that elections are free and fair."
2024	American Civil Liberties Union (ACLU)) (founded in 1920)	New York City	"for their contribution to strengthening democracy through elections, ensuring that elections are free and fair."
2024	International Court of Justice (ICJ) (founded in 1945)	The Hague	"for peaceful resolution of conflicts between states in an increasingly polarized world through international law."
2024	United Nations Relief and Works Agency (UNRWA) (founded in 1949)	Gaza	"for its role in supporting the lives of millions of Palestinian women, men and children."
2024	Philippe Lazzarini (born 1964)	Switzerland	"for its role in supporting the lives of millions of Palestinian women, men and children."
2024	Article36 (founded in 2011)	Exeter	"for maintaining peace and security through safeguarding emerging technologies."
2024	Campaign to Stop Killer Robots (founded in 2012)	London	"for maintaining peace and security through safeguarding emerging technologies."
2024	United Nations Educational, Scientific and Cultural Organization (UNESCO) (founded in 1945)	Paris	"for the promotion of peace through history education, resonating well with Alfred Nobel's call for 'fraternity between nations'."
2024	Council of Europe (founded in 1949)	Strasbourg	"for the promotion of peace through history education, resonating well with Alfred Nobel's call for 'fraternity between nations'."
2025
2025	Sudan's Emergency Response Rooms (ERR) (founded in 2023)	Sudan	"for its efforts to meet overwhelming humanitarian needs, prompting community-led, volunteer aid networks in Sudan to step in and provide lifesaving services to millions of women, men and children."
2025	Mohammed bin Abdulrahman bin Jassim Al Thani (born 1980)	Qatar	"for his contributions in the pursuit of global peace and crucially mediating the Hamas-Israeli ceasefire reached in January 2025."
2025	Office for Democratic Institutions and Human Rights (ODIHR) (founded in 1991)	Warsaw	"for their efforts in strengthening democracy through election observation, ensuring that elections are free and fair against the rise of illiberal movements and authoritarian regimes."
2025	The Carter Center (founded 1982)	Atlanta	"for their efforts in strengthening democracy through election observation, ensuring that elections are free and fair against the rise of illiberal movements and authoritarian regimes."
2025	Women's International League for Peace and Freedom (WILPF) (founded in 1915)	Geneva	"in recognition of its long and faithful service to peace and disarmament, and the significance of women-led peace initiatives in championing global peace."
2025	International Court of Justice (ICJ) (founded in 1945)	The Hague	"for their role in fostering multilateral collaboration and holding those who breach internationally recognized norms to account."
2025	International Criminal Court (ICC) (founded in 2002)	The Hague	"for their role in fostering multilateral collaboration and holding those who breach internationally recognized norms to account."
-
PRIO Director-elect		Tenure	
		**Nina Græger**; Born: 11 February 1965 (aged 61) in Oslo, Norway; Director, Peace Research Institute Oslo: 1 July 2025	
