= Global Compact =

Global Compact as used in politics may refer broadly to an international pact or treaty; in more specific cases it may refer to:

- United Nations Global Compact, a non-binding United Nations pact of business policies
- Global Compact for Safe, Orderly and Regular Migration (GCM), a UN non-binding intergovernmental agreement
- Global Compact on Refugees
