= Sana Mustafa =

Syrian author, activist, organization founder

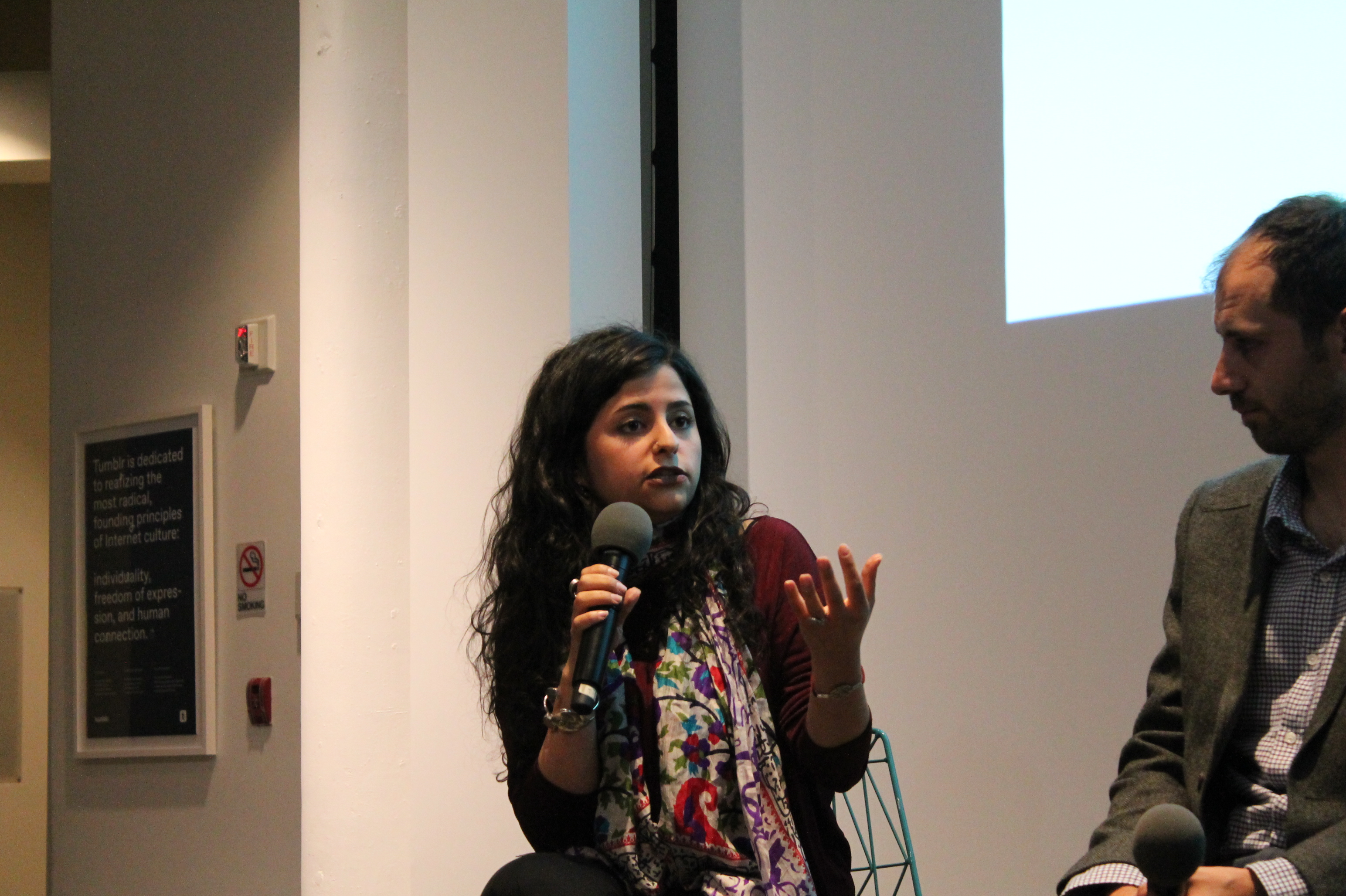
- Mustafa in 2017
- Born: Syria
- Education: Damascus University; Bard College
- Known for: Co-founding Global Refugee-Led Network; Co-authoring We Are Syrians

Sana Mustafa is a US-based Syrian refugee, author, activist and non-profit founder.

Mustafa co-founded the Network for Refugee Voices (which later became the Global Refugee-Led Network) and co-authored We Are Syrians.

== Early life ==
Mustafa was born in Syria and studied business and marketing at Damascus University.

== Arrest, escape from Syria ==
She was arrested in 2011 during Syria Civil War.

Mustafa visited USA in the summer of 2013 on a U.S. State Department funded a six-week fellowship that took her to Washington D.C. and Roger Williams University in Rhode Island. In July 2013, while she was in USA, her father Ali Mustafa a prominent business person and political activist opposed to Syrian President Bashar al-Assad, was abducted by the Shabiha. She has not heard from her father since the abduction.

While she was still in USA, she applied for and received asylum. Meanwhile, her mother Lamia Zreik and two sisters fled Syria for Gaziantep, Turkey from where they also applied for asylum to USA.

== Education, early life in USA ==
Mustafa moved into an apartment in Hudson Valley; her plans for her family to join her in the United States were thwarted by Donald Trump's refugee policies. Her older sister Wafa left Turkey for Germany.

In New York City, Mustafa worked in a restaurant, as an Arabic tutor, and as a live-in babysitter. She won a scholarship to study political science at Bard College and organized the conference From Surviving to Thriving: Syrian Refugees Speak.

Her mother and younger sister moved to Canada.

== Advocacy and writing ==
In 2017, co-authoring with Naila Al Atrash and Radwan Ziadeh, she wrote We Are Syrians. Her 2019 Ted Talk spoke about the need for inclusion of refugees in policy solutions. Her frustration with the lack of inclusion preceded her co-founding the Network for Refugee Voices and attending the United Nations global refugee summit in 2019. Network for Refugee Voices later became the Global Refugee-Led Network.

In 2020, Mustafa worked as the Associate Director of Partnerships and Engagement at Asylum Access in Canada, in 2022, she was the CEO.
