= Network for Refugee Voices =

Refugee organization

- Successor: Global Refugee-Led Network
- Formation: 2017
- Founders: Amaf Yousef; Ameenah Sawwan; Bakri Hilani; Georges Talamas; Iyad Kallas; Adam Elsod; Osama Salem; Ruham Hawash; Salim Salamah; Samah Alhakwati; Sana Mustafa; Shaza Al Rihawi
- Website: www.networkforrefugeevoices.org

The Network for Refugee Voices was an international refugee network that advocated for refugee voices to be included in global refugee policy decisions.

The Network for Refugee Voices has since been superseded by the Global Refugee-Led Network.

== Founding ==
The Network for Refugee Voices was founded officially in 2017, after informally organizing in 2016.

== Membership ==
The founders were twelve young, mostly Syrian refugees advocates and activists, members were both refugees and refugee-led organizations. The organization did not emphasize any strict membership criteria or structure.

== Objectives and activities ==
The strategic objective of the network was to reform global refugee protection efforts to make refugees active participants in policy decisions, and to position refugees as experts who can influence global policy making.

The specific activities undertaken to meet that objective were to influence the United Nations Global Compact for Migration, and the Global Compact on Refugees, and to attend the United Nations High Commissioner for Refugees' upcoming framework for equitable responsibility sharing. Out of the three activities, the Global Compact On Refugees was the highest priority.

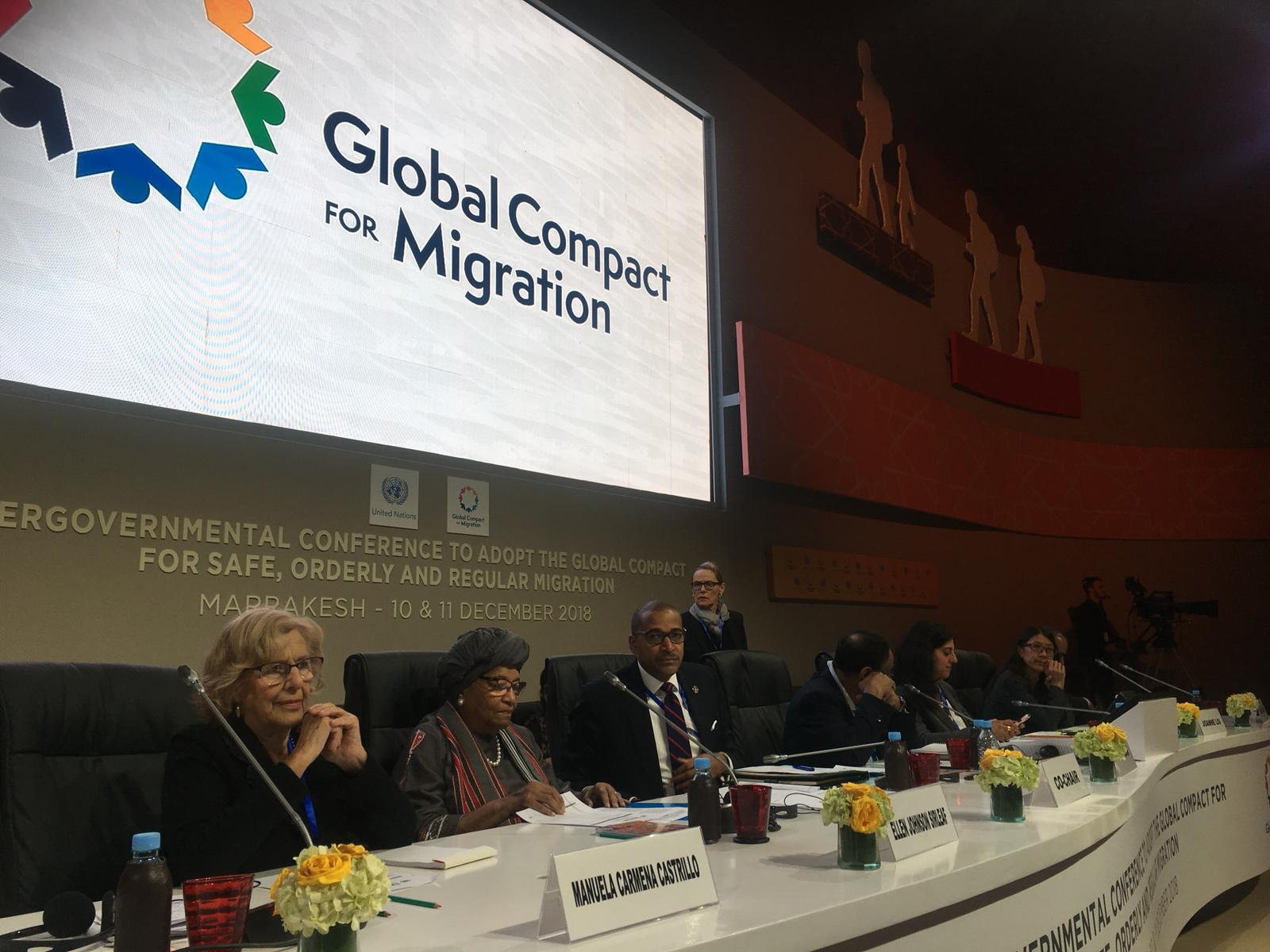
Global Compact for Migration meeting in Marrakech, 2018

Other activities included wider advocacy for improved refugee representation in local and global refugee protection regimes. These advocacy efforts led to increased awareness of the network and greater influence, including attendance at the June 2018 Global Summit of Refugees in Geneva.

The ambitions of the network are most clearly expressed in a quote used by Haqqi Bahram in his 2020 paper "Between Tokenism and Self-Representation": "We have been very vocative about saying nothing about us without us, and that is because we are the people affected by refugee policy, and that is why we have to be part of it."

The Network for Refugee Voices was superseded by the Global Refugee-Led Network.
