= Adam Braver =

American author of historical fiction

- Born: 1963 (age 62–63); Berkeley, California, U.S.
- Occupation: Author
- Writing career
- Genre: Historical fiction
- Website: adambraver.com

Adam Braver (born 1963, in Berkeley, California) is an American author of historical fiction.

His first book was Mr. Lincoln's Wars (Harper Perennial, 2003), a novel told from thirteen different perspectives in order to illuminate Abraham Lincoln's inner life. Second was Divine Sarah (William Morrow, 2004), which fictionalizes actress Sarah Bernhardt's Farewell Tour of America. Crows Over the Wheatfield (Harper Perennial, 2006) told the story of a renowned Van Gogh scholar struggling to deal with her guilt after she accidentally kills a young boy in a car accident. November 22, 1963 (Tin House Books, 2008) is a fictionalization of the day of the assassination of President John F. Kennedy, "Misfit" (Tin House Books, 2012), focuses on the last weekend in the life of Marilyn Monroe. "The Disappeared" (Outpost19 Books, 2017), is a novel of two strangers swept up in the aftermath of two politicized acts of violence. His forthcoming novel, "Rejoice the Head of Paul McCartney" takes place in 1969 following the aftermath of the disappearance of Paul McCartney's head from a billboard on the Sunset Strip, and how that moment of desecrating the symbol of an era affects the lives of the characters over the course of several decades.

Braver's books have been translated in France, Italy, Japan, Russia, and Turkey. His short stories have appeared in journals such as "Harvard Review," "Tin House," "Daedalus," "Ontario Review," "The Normal School," and "West Branch." His work has been anthologized in "The Lincoln Anthology" (The Library of America, 2008), "Breakthrough" (Peter Lang Publishers, 2007), and "No Near Exit: Writers Select Their Favorite Work From Post Road Magazine" (Dzanc Books, 2010).

Additionally, he co-edited "The Madrid Conversations (UNO Press, 2013), a book-length interview with former Cuban dissident and prisoner of conscience, Normando Hernandez Gonzalez; "Jewher Ilham - A Uyghur's Fight to Free Her Father" (UNO Press, 2015); "We Are Syrians - Three Generations. Three Dissidents" (UNO Press, 2017); "Dear Baba - A Story Through Letters" (UNO Press, 2019); and "Because I Have To: The Path to Survival, The Uyghur Struggle" (UNO Press, 2022).

Braver is on faculty and the University Library Program Director at Roger Williams University; he also regularly teaches at the New York State Summer Writers Institute.

== Distinctions ==
- Barnes & Noble Discover Great Writers Selection (2003)
- Borders Original Voices Selection (2003)
- Book Sense Pick (2003 and 2006)
- Indie Next List Notable (2008)
- Finalist for the Texas Institute of Letters Jesse H. Jones Award for Fiction (2009)
- Elle Magazine Reader's Prize Pick (August 2012)
