= April 2013 Bachu unrest =

Ethnic violence in Xinjiang, China

- Part of the Xinjiang conflict
- Location: Selibuya, Bachu, Xinjiang, China
- Date: 24 April 2013
- Attack type: Knife attack, Arson
- Deaths: 21 in total 15 community workers and police officers

On 24 April 2013, ethnic clashes occurred in Marelbeshi (Bachu), Xinjiang, China. The violence left at least 21 people dead, including 15 police and officials.

== April 2013 violence ==
On 24 April 2013, deadly clashes broke out between policemen and ethnic Uyghur suspected terrorists, which according to state officials began when three local government officials reported a suspicious group of individuals armed with knives, outside a home in the Seriqbuya township located outside the city of Kashgar. While the group was in process of reporting this to their superiors, they were apprehended by the armed men hiding inside the home, killing the three unarmed officials. Afterwards policemen and community cadres at the local police station were informed by the workers' earlier reports and went to handle the matter.

According to Chinese state media, when the policemen, some being unarmed, arrived to investigate the situation, armed men attacked them, killing three police officers and three of the attackers. Then nine policemen were cornered in the assailants house, which was set on fire, referred to as a "planned terrorist attack" against innocent victims. According to a report filed about incident, eleven of the deceased officials and policemen were ethnic Uyghurs, while the remaining four were Han Chinese. Chinese Foreign Ministry spokesmen Hua Chunying, said initial police investigations showed it had been a "premeditated attack carried out by a violent terrorists [sic] organization".

As a result of the violence 21 people died, including policemen and social workers.

== Trial ==
Nineteen members of an unnamed extremist group were arrested. Its suspected leader, Musa Hesen, was sentenced to death, along with another suspect after a one-day trial in Kashgar on 12 August for murder, forming and leading a terrorist organisation and illegally manufacturing explosives. Three others were sentenced to prison sentences ranging from nine years to life.

== Aftermath ==
After two months, on 26 June, 27 people were killed in riots, 17 of them were killed in the violence, while the other 10 people were shot dead by police in the township of Lukqun.

== See also ==
- Xinjiang Conflict
- 2013 Tiananmen Square attack
