= Intergovernmental Conference to Adopt the Global Compact for Safe, Orderly and Regular Migration =

The Intergovernmental Conference to Adopt the Global Compact for Safe, Orderly and Regular Migration was a United Nations conference held on 10–11 December 2018 in Marrakesh. The purpose of the conference was to formally adopt the Global Compact for Migration.

== Statements ==
In his opening statement, UN secretary-general António Guterres emphasized that the GCM is aimed in particular at the 20% (around 50 million) of illegal migrants worldwide. It is also about avoiding human suffering during migration - over 60,000 migrants have lost their lives since 2000. The pact is historic because it gives the UN the opportunity to work effectively with UN member states on migration issues.

The general debate was opened by 13 heads of state and heads of government: Chancellor Angela Merkel (Germany), Lars Løkke Rasmussen (Denmark), Alexis Tsipras (Greece), Charles Michel (Belgium), Pedro Sánchez (Spain) and Cardinal Pietro Parolin.
