= Ilham Tohti =

Chinese economist and activist

- ئىلھام توختى
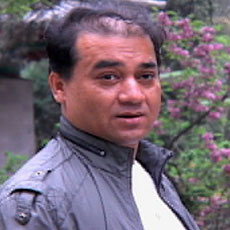
- Born: October 25, 1969 (age 57); Artush, Xinjiang, China
- Education: Northeast Normal University (BA); Minzu University of China (MA)
- Occupations: University Lecturer, Economist, Blogger
- Known for: Critique of the Chinese Communist Party policies in Xinjiang, repression of the Uyghur ethnic minority in China
- Criminal charge: Offence of "splitting the state" Separatism
- Criminal penalty: Life sentence
- Spouse: Guzailai Nu'er(China)
- Children: Jewher Ilham (United States)
- Awards: Freedom Award (2019); Sakharov Prize (2019); Václav Havel Human Rights Prize (2019)

Ilham Tohti (Uyghur: ئىلھام توختى; Chinese: 伊力哈木·土赫提; pinyin: Yīlìhāmù Tǔhètí; born October 25, 1969) is a Uyghur economist currently serving a life sentence in China, on separatism-related charges. He is a vocal advocate for the implementation of regional autonomy laws in China. In 2006 he founded Uyghur Online, a website that discusses Uyghur issues, and is known for his research on Uyghur-Han relations. Ilham was summoned from his Beijing home and detained shortly after the July 2009 Ürümqi riots for his criticism of the Chinese government's policies toward Uyghurs in Xinjiang. Ilham was released on August 23 after international pressure and condemnation. He was arrested again in January 2014 and imprisoned after a two-day trial. Ilham has received the PEN/Barbara Goldsmith Freedom to Write Award (2014), the Martin Ennals Award (2016), the Václav Havel Human Rights Prize (2019), and the Sakharov Prize (2019). Ilham is viewed as a moderate and believes that Xinjiang should be granted autonomy according to democratic principles.

== Background ==
Tohti was born in Artush, Xinjiang Uyghur Autonomous Region, China on October 25, 1969. He graduated from the Northeast Normal University and the Economics School at what was then called the Central Nationalities University, now named Minzu University of China (MUC), in Beijing, where he studied economics, and later taught said subject there.

"There have always been tensions between the Han Chinese and the Uighurs. But they had never led to mutual hatred. I believe that the trust between the Uighur minority and the Han Chinese is now destroyed. I also think that ethnic hatred has been taking shape. If Beijing can't bring the situation under control and continues to behave like a colonial power, we will continue to witness tragedies such as this one,"

— Ilham Tohti, in an interview with DW in 2009 after the Urumqi riots.

After graduating, Tohti briefly worked in the Southern Xinjiang People's Liberation Army (PLA) military zone before transitioning to civilian life. He comes from a family with significant ties to public service. One of his older brothers has held various positions within the Kizilsu Kirghiz Autonomous Prefecture, including leadership roles in the Communist Youth League and Civil Affairs Bureau. Another brother has served in the public security system, rising to the position of Secretary of the Disciplinary Inspection Committee within the local Public Security Bureau.

Tohti traveled extensively through Central Asia, Russia, and South Asia, where he observed ethnic conflicts, political unrest, and social instability. These experiences reinforced his commitment to studying issues affecting Xinjiang and Central Asia to help prevent similar outcomes in China.

Officials accused him of using his lectures to incite violence, and overthrowing the current government of the People's Republic of China and of participating in separatism activities. According to the limited public information about the trial, the prosecutor claimed that Ilham Tohti mentioned multiple times "do not think [that] violent protests are terrorist activities" during his lectures in the MUC. State media claimed that Ilham Tohti used the "April 23" case to overtly advocate violence and used hate speech during his lectures like "Using violence fights against violence, I admire them as heroes", "A peaceful person like me may kill and resist". Tohti denied these claims.

He faced government surveillance and harassment starting in 1994. Between 1999 and 2003, he was prohibited from teaching, and after 1999, restrictions prevented him from publishing through conventional channels. To continue raising awareness about the economic, social, and developmental challenges affecting the Uyghur community, he shifted to using the internet as a platform for discussion. In 2006 Ilham founded a website called, Uyghur Online, which published articles in Chinese and Uyghur on social issues. In mid-2008 authorities shut down the website, accusing it of forging links to extremists in the Uyghur diaspora. In a March 2009 interview with Radio Free Asia, Ilham criticized the Chinese government's policy to allow migrant workers into Xinjiang Uyghur Autonomous Region and the phenomenon of young Uyghur women moving to eastern China to find work. In addition, he criticized Xinjiang Uyghur Governor Nur Bekri for "always stress[ing] the stability and security of Xinjiang" instead of "car[ing] about Uyghurs", calling for a stricter interpretation of China's 1984 Regional Ethnic Autonomy Law. That same month, Ilham was detained by authorities, accused of separatism, and interrogated.

On January 17, 2011 Tohti denied the separatist allegation in his article "My Ideals and the Career Path I Have Chosen" 《我的理想和事业选择之路》discussing Uyghur Online and why he chose to start the website, wanting "mutual understanding as well as dialogue among ethnic communities."

China had created in Ilham Tohti "a Uighur Mandela," by jailing him for life in September 2014, as the scholar Wang Lixiong wrote in a Twitter message. The Chinese state-run news agency Xinhua dismissed the comparison claiming that "[w]hile Mandela preached reconciliation, Ilham Tohti preaches hatred and killing."

== Detentions and trial ==
On July 5, 2009 ethnic rioting took place between Uyghurs and Han in Ürümqi, the capital of Xinjiang. The government reported that more than 150 people, mostly Han Chinese, were killed during the clashes. Many Uyghurs claim the governments numbers do not account for the Uyghurs killed by Han vigilantes and security forces. Governor Nur Bekri claimed in a July 6 speech that Uyghur Online had spread rumors that contributed to the riots. Officials avoided discussion of issues such as the limits on Uyghur religious practice, the asymmetry of economic opportunities for Han and Uyghurs, the suppression of the Uyghur language, or the increasing Han immigration in a Uyghur majority province.

On July 8, 2009, Radio Free Asia reported that Ilham's whereabouts were unknown after he had been summoned from his home in Beijing. The Chinese dissident Wang Lixiong and his Tibetan activist wife Woeser started an on-line petition calling for Ilham's release, which was signed by other dissidents including Ran Yunfei. PEN American Center, Amnesty International, and Reporters Without Borders also issued appeals or statements of concern.

Ilham was released from detention on August 23, along with two other Chinese dissidents, Xu Zhiyong and Zhuang Lu, after pressure on Beijing from the administration of American President Barack Obama. Ilham said that during his detention, he was confined to his home and a hotel with several police officers who did not treat him inhumanely. He stated that after his release, they warned him against criticism of the government's handling of riots, and prevented him and his family from leaving Beijing.

Chinese authorities arrested and detained Ilham again in January 2014 while boarding a flight from Beijing to United States with his daughter and Uyghur activist Jewher Ilham. after Ilham's criticism of Beijing's response to a suicide bombing near Tianamen Square, carried out by Uyghurs.

After a two day trial, The Urumqi People's Intermediate Court found Ilham guilty andOn January 15 Chinese authorities raided Ilham's house and the Chinese government removed computers from his home. As well seizing all his money and property.He was sentenced to life in September 2014 on charges of separatism and held at a detention center in Xinjiang Uyghur Autonomous Region. Prosecutors alleged that he had promoted independence for Xinjiang through his website, Uyghur Online, which he had established to foster dialogue and understanding between Uyghurs and Han Chinese. Amnesty International asserted Ilham's legal team were never shown evidence and furthermore denied access to their client for six months, and condemned the trial as an "affront to justice". His imprisonment is criticized by a number of human rights organizations around the globe; such as Electronic Frontier Foundation.

Following the sentencing, his family focused on raising support for his wife and children rather than campaigning publicly for his release.

== International support ==
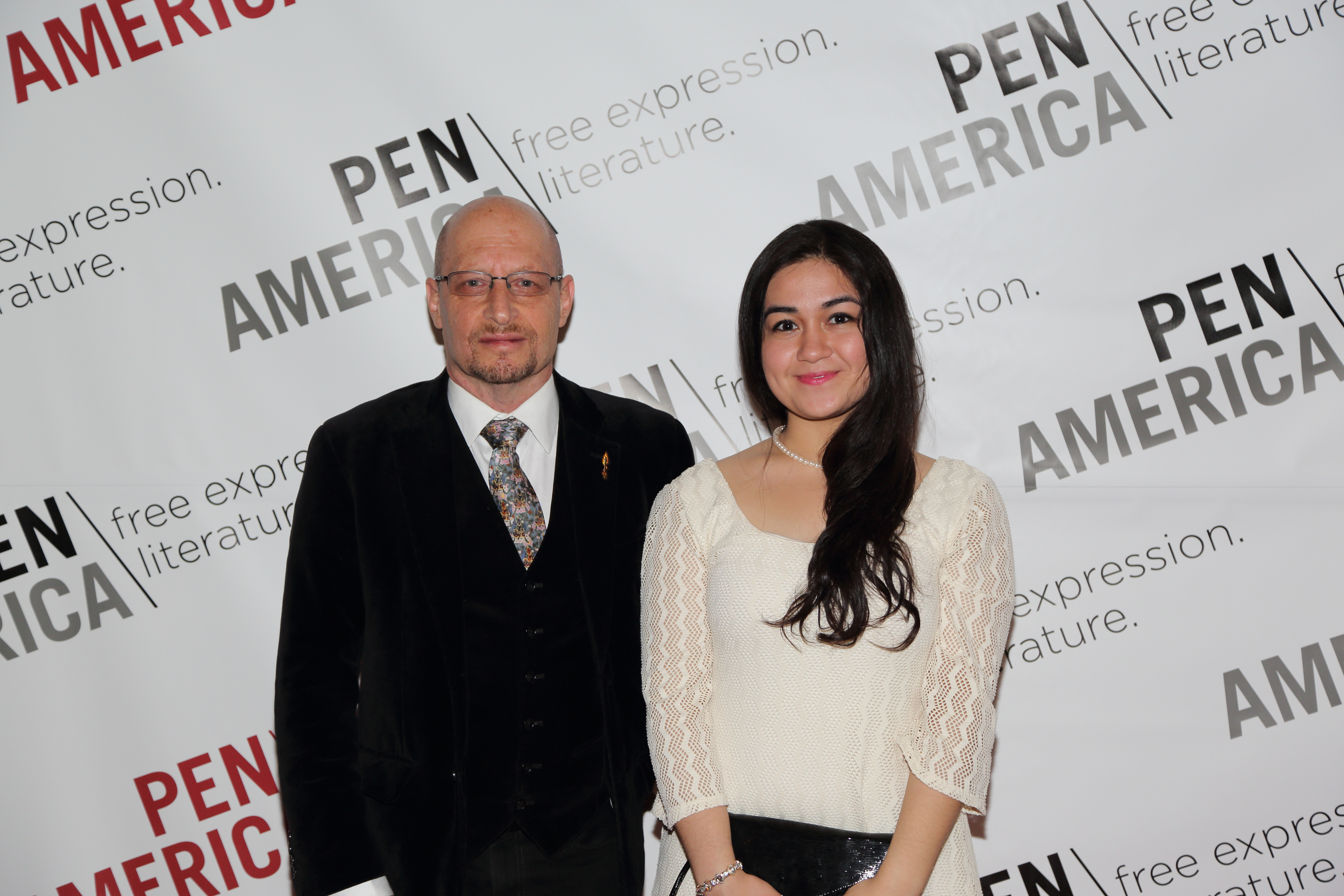
Ilham Tohti's daughter Jewher Ilham with Elliot Sperling at Lederman/PEN American Center, May 2014

On September 24, 2014, United States Secretary of State John Kerry criticized what he called a 'harsh' sentence, and called for Ilham's release.

In 2021 China denied the request of a group of Ambassadors from European Union countries to visit Ilham Tohti with Chinese authorities citing his convicted status as the reason they could not meet with him.

In 2020 the Ilham Tohti Initiative was started with the mission to continue his research and restore his website, as well as advocate for his release.

On March 31, 2022, the Human Rights Watch reported that the Chinese government have arbitrarily detained the students of Ilham Tohti. A leaked government list of prisoners indicated that six of the seven students on the list were sentenced in December 2014 to between three-and-a-half and eight years in prison. Previous reports have revealed that individuals who were supposed to be released from prison were sent soon after release or immediately to political education camps or prisons instead.

In September 2024 Amnesty International has launched a new petition calling to Tohti's release on the 10th anniversary of his arrest.

== Awards and recognition ==
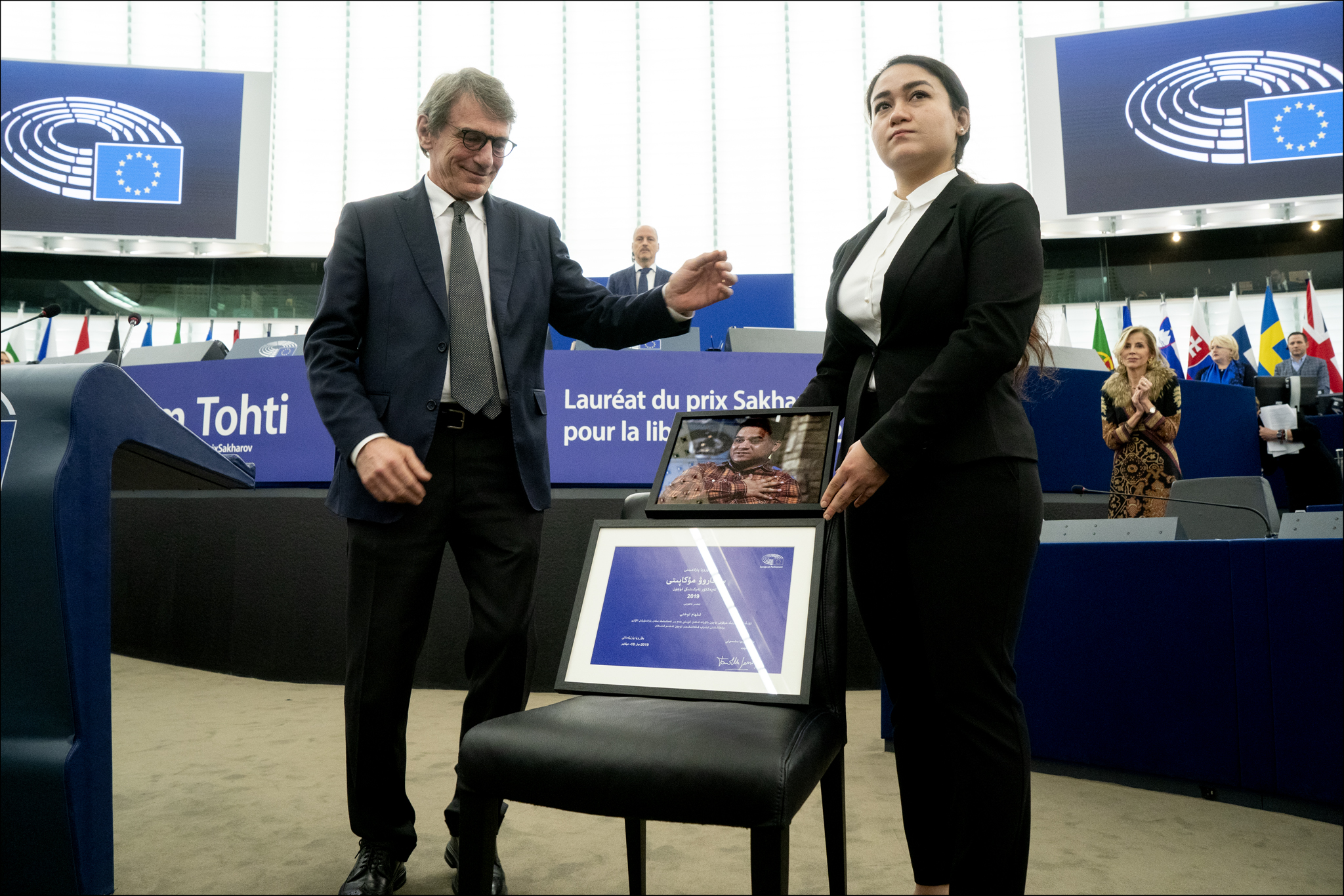
Jewher Ilham accepting the 2019 Sakharov Prize on behalf of her father from David Sassoli, President of the European Parliament

On April 1, 2014, Ilham was awarded the PEN/Barbara Goldsmith Freedom to Write Award, an American human rights award given to writers anywhere in the world who fight for freedom of expression. According to the statement from PEN, Ilham, was "long harassed by Chinese authorities for his outspoken views on the rights of China's Muslim Uyghur minority. Ilham represents a new generation of endangered writers who use the web and social media to fight oppression and broadcast to concerned parties around the globe. We hope this honor helps awaken Chinese authorities to the injustice being perpetrated and galvanizes the worldwide campaign to demand Ilham's freedom." China's foreign ministry expressed anger at the award, saying that he was a suspected criminal.

In September 2016 he was nominated for the Sakharov Prize for Freedom of Thought, and the following month he was declared as the winner of the Martin Ennals Award for Human Rights Defenders. The Martin Ennals foundation cited Ilham for spending two decades trying "to foster dialogue and understanding" between the Han Chinese majority and members of Xinjiang's largely Muslim Uyghurs. "He has rejected separatism and violence, and sought reconciliation based on a respect for Uighur culture, which has been subject to religious, cultural and political repression," they added.

In 2017, Tohti was awarded the Weimar Human Rights Prize in recognition of his commitment to the rights of Uyghurs in the Xinjiang Uyghur Autonomous Region. Also, was awarded Liberal International's Prize for Freedom in his absence. It was accepted on the behalf of the human rights group advocating for his release.

In September 2019 the Council of Europe jointly awarded the 2019 Václav Havel Human Rights Prize to Ilham Tohti and the Youth Initiative for Human Rights. Enver Can of the Ilham Tohti Initiative received the prize on his behalf.

In October 2019 Ilham Tohti was awarded the 2019 Sakharov Prize for Freedom of Thought by the European Parliament.

Tohti has dedicated his life to advocating for the rights of the Uyghur minority in China. Despite being a voice of moderation and reconciliation, he was sentenced to life in prison following a show trial in 2014. By awarding this prize, we strongly urge the Chinese government to release Tohti and we call for the respect of minority rights in China.

— David Sassoli (President of the European Parliament)

In December 2019 Tohti's daughter, Jewher Ilham, accepted the Sakharov Prize and €50,000 on his behalf.

I am grateful for the opportunity to tell his story, because he cannot tell it himself. To be honest with you, I do not know where my father is. 2017 was the last time my family received word about him.

— Jewher Ilham

He was featured in the 2021 edition of The Muslim 500: The World's 500 Most Influential Muslims which named him Man of the Year.

Ilham has received a lot of support internationally to nominate him for the 2025 Nobel Peace Prize and was nominated in January of last year.

== See also ==
- List of Chinese pro-democracy activists
