= We Are Syrians =

Non-fiction book about Syrian Civil War

- Editors: Adam Braver, & Abby Deveuve
- Author: Sana Mustafa, Naila Al Atrash, & Radwan Ziadeh
- Language: English
- Subject: Syrian civil war
- Genre: Non-fiction, autobiography
- Publisher: University of New Orleans Press
- Pages: 184
- ISBN: 9781608011339

We Are Syrians is an autobiographical memoir by Sana Mustafa, Naila Al Atrash, and Radwan Ziadeh.

It was published in 2017 by the University of New Orleans Press and was edited by Adam Braver and Abby Deveuve. Both editors worked at the Scholars at Risk Network.

The book is the fourth in a series of publications by the University of New Orleans Press called "Broken Silence".

== Plot ==
The book documents the lives of three generations of Syrian dissidents. It starts with theatre director Naila Al Atrash, who, after studying in Bulgaria, returned to Syria to organize political theatre. Al Atrash is the granddaughter of Sultan Pasha al-Atrash a famous military hero of the first Syrian Revolution.

The second part of the book is about Radwan Ziadeh who grew up in Syria as it was being controlled by President Bashar al-Assad. Originally a dentist, Ziadeh became an intellectual who took part in the 2000 Damascus Spring.

The third part follows the story of Sana Mustafa. Mustafa, a university student in Damascus, takes part in peaceful protests against the government of Bashar al-Assad. While on an educational exchange program in USA, she is notified by text message that her father is detained and that her family are fleeing to Turkey. She applies for and receives political asylum in USA and completes her education at Bard College.

== Writing style ==
We are Syrians is presented as a first-person narrative which was put together from a series of interviews.

== Reception ==
We are Syrians was described as "compelling" by Maryam Rafiee's writing in Kirkus Reviews and by academic reviewer Edward Fitzpatrick.

Rebecca Foster, writing for Foreword Reviews, complimented the editors for letting the three subjects tell their own stories and noted that the book is likely to provoke increased empathy from Western readers towards people affected by the Syria Civil War.
