= Seriqbuya =

Seriqbuya Sëriqbuya, سېرىقبۇيا Serikbuya, Selibuya
- Town
- سېرىقبۇيا, 色力布亚 (Sèlìbùyà)
- Location in Xinjiang
- Coordinates: 39°18′10″N 77°49′17″E
- Country: People's Republic of China
- Autonomous Region: Xinjiang
- Prefecture: Kashgar
- County: Maralbexi / Bachu

Area
  - Total: 280 km^{2} (110 sq mi)

Population (2010)
  - Total: 44,642
  - Density: 160/km^{2} (410/sq mi)

Ethnic groups
  - Major ethnic group: Uyghur
- Time zone: GMT+6
- Postal code: 844000
- Area code: 0998

Alternative Chinese name
- Traditional Chinese: 色力布亞鎮
- Simplified Chinese: 色力布亚镇
Transcriptions
Standard Mandarin
- Hanyu Pinyin: Sèlìbùyǎ Zhèn

Seriqbuya (Uyghur: سېرىقبۇيا, USY: Сериқбуя, ULY: Sëriqbuya; Chinese: 色力布亚镇; pinyin: Sèlìbùyǎ Zhèn) or Serikbuya is a town in Maralbexi (Bachu) County, Kashgar Prefecture, Xinjiang, China. It is located on Provincial Road 215, on the left (northwestern) bank of the Yarkand River and about 160 kilometers to the east of the city of Kashgar.

== Name ==
The name Seriqbuya is from the Uyghur language and means yellow Sophora alopecuroides.

== History ==
In 1950, Seriqbuya District (色力布亚区) was established.

In 1958, Seriqbuya became a commune (色力布亚公社).'

In 1967 during the Cultural Revolution, the commune was renamed Dongfanghong Commune (literally, 'The East is Red Commune'; 东方红公社).

In 1984, Seriqbuya Town (色力布亚镇) was created.

In 2013, Seriqbuya was the site of the April 2013 Bachu unrest between ethnic Uyghurs on one side and Chinese government officials and police on the other.

== Administrative divisions ==
Seriqbuya includes ten residential communities and twenty villages (Mandarin Chinese Hanyu Pinyin-derived names, except where Uyghur is provided):

Residential communities:

- Kulebeixi (库勒贝希社区), Yingbazha (英巴扎社区), Keruikebeixi (科瑞克贝希社区), Wusitangboyi (吾斯塘博依社区), Ayikule (阿依库勒社区), Yingbage (英巴格社区), Daqiakule (达恰库勒社区), Humudanbeixi (胡木旦贝希社区), Dunmaili (墩买里社区), Xialelike (夏勒力克社区)

Villages:

- Nuobeixi (诺贝希村), Kala'aikenboyi (喀拉艾肯博依村), Yingmaili (英买里村), Akewusitang (阿克吾斯塘村), Kekeligantale (科克力干塔勒村), Xiakele'awati (夏喀勒阿瓦提村), Tuogelake (托格拉克村), Kunqibulong (昆其布隆村), Kumusareyi (库木萨热依村), Pahemileke (帕合米勒克村), Aketaikaisike (阿勒台开斯克村), Akedunjiemi (阿克墩结米村), Kebaishitupu (科拜什吐普村), Saikesantale (赛克散塔勒村), Boz'ëriq (بوزئېرىق كەنت / Bozi'airike 博孜艾日克村), Ying'awati (英阿瓦提村), Keyakelike (克亚克力克村), Kuremutuogelake (库热木托格拉克村), Yolwasqotan (يولۋاسقوتان كەنت / Yaolewasikuotan 尧勒瓦斯阔坦村), Ketaikelike (科台克力克村)'

== Demographics ==
Historical population
Year	Pop.	±% p.a.
2000	32,052	—
2010	44,642	+3.37%

As of 1997, Seriqbuya's population was 98.6% Uyghur.

== Economy ==
Seriqbuya is a traditional southern Xinjiang agricultural village and market town where as many as ten-thousand people meet to trade. The business skills of local traders are strong and many traders from Seriqbuya have migrated to Beijing and Shanghai. Nearby farms produce licorice and medicinal products as a specialty.

== Historical maps ==
Historical English-language maps including Seriqbuya:

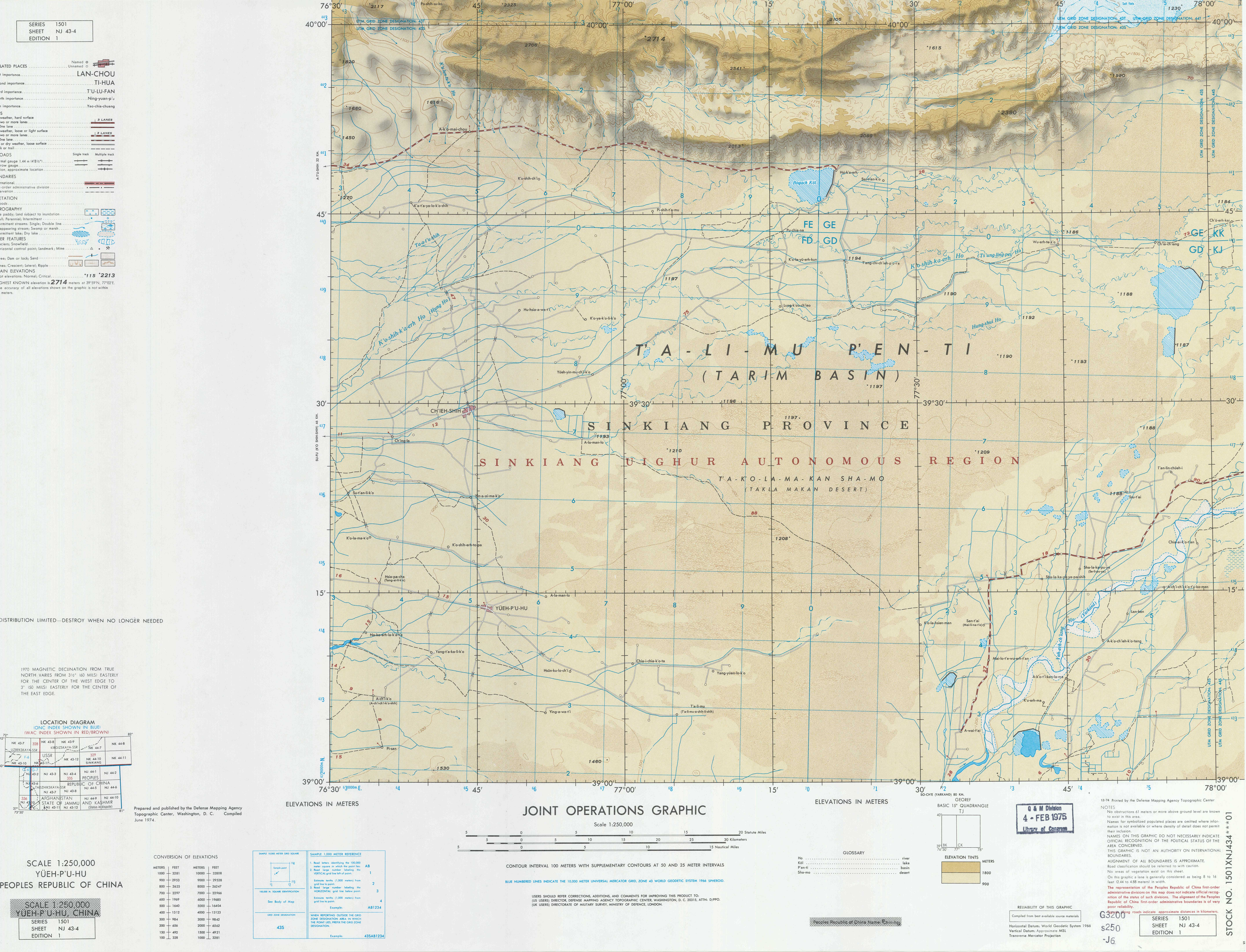
Map including Seriqbuya (labeled as Sha-la-ka-pu-ya (Se-li-pu-ya)) (DMA, 1974)

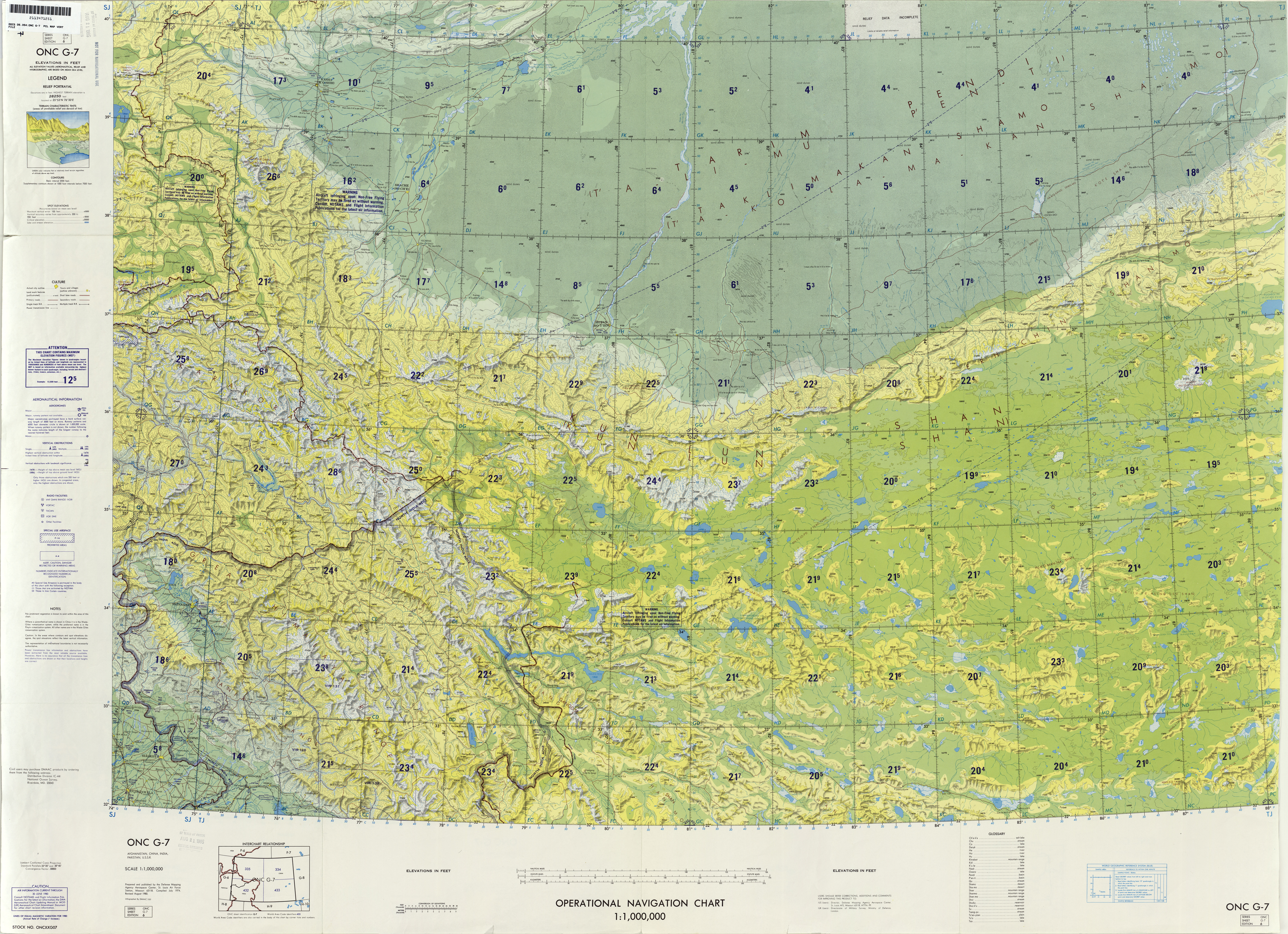
From the Operational Navigation Chart; map including Seriqbuya (labeled as Serikbuya (Se-li-pu-ya)) (DMA, 1980) (Note: From map: "The representation of international boundaries is not necessarily authoritative.")

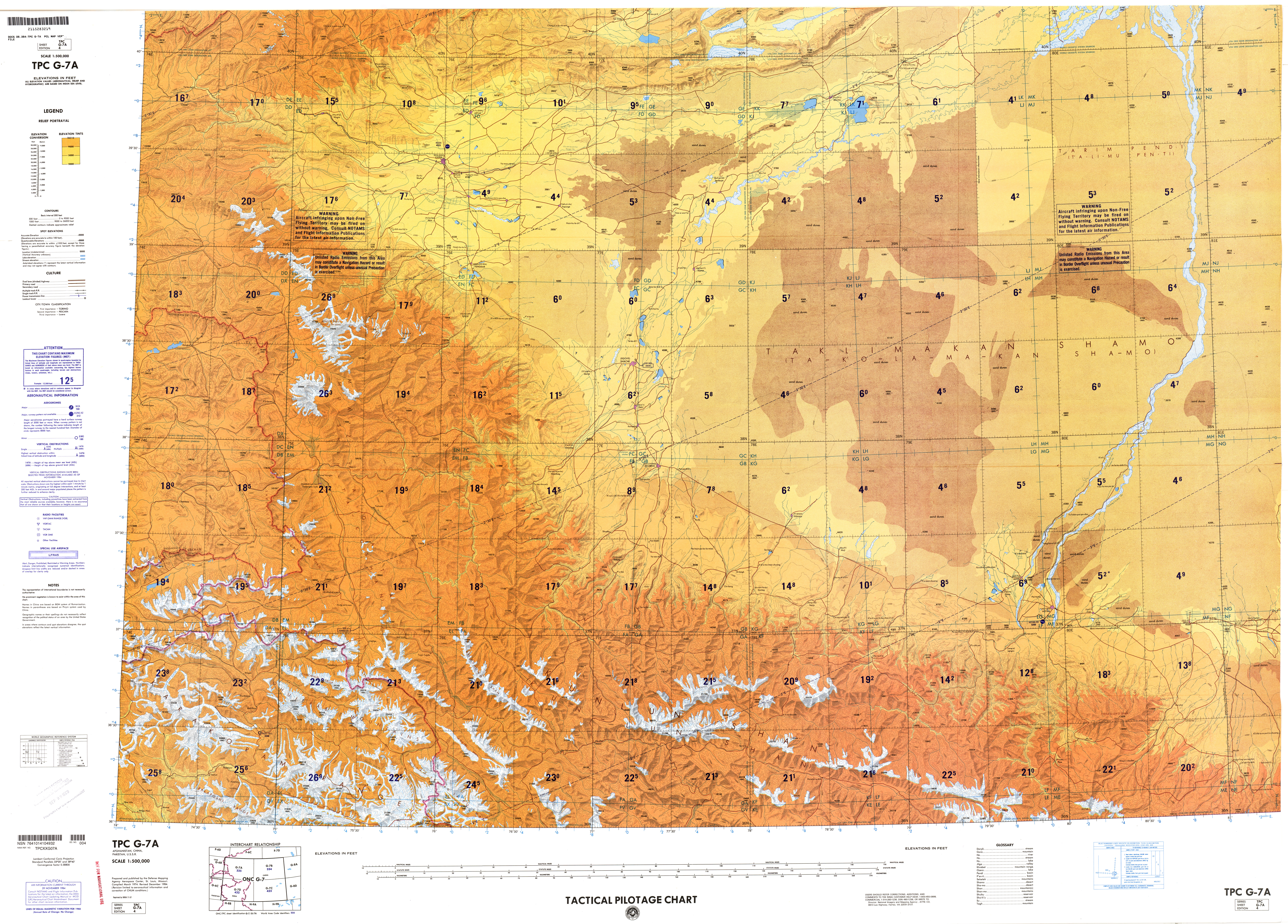
Map including Seriqbuya (labeled as Seribuya (Se-li-pu-ya)) (DMA, 1984) (Note: From map: "The representation of international boundaries is not necessarily authoritative")

== See also ==
- List of township-level divisions of Xinjiang
