= Global Compact on Refugees =

Intergovernmental agreement

The Global Compact on Refugees is an international agreement, prepared under the auspices of the United Nations, that provides a framework to improve the worldwide response to the needs of refugees.

Governments make pledges under the compact at the Global Refugee Forum regular meeting.

== Signatories ==
The United Nations General Assembly affirmed the compact (resolution A/RES/73/151) on 17 December 2018. 181 nations voted in favour of the compact, the United States and Hungary voted against, Eritrea, Libya, and the Dominican Republic abstained from the vote.

== Reception ==
The agreement of the compact was described by Filippo Grandi as the most pivotal moment he had witnessed in his 34 years of working with refugees. Louise Arbour, the United Nations Special Representative for International Migration, described the international agreement as "wonderful", "historic" and "a great achievement for multilateralism."

== See also ==
- United Nations High Commissioner for Refugees
- Convention Relating to the Status of Refugees
- Network for Refugee Voices
- Global Refugee-Led Network
- Global Compact for Migration
