= Maralbexi County =

Maralbexi County: مارالبېشى ناھىيىسى (Uyghur); 巴楚县 (Chinese); Bachu; Maralbashi; Maralbeshi; Pachu
- County
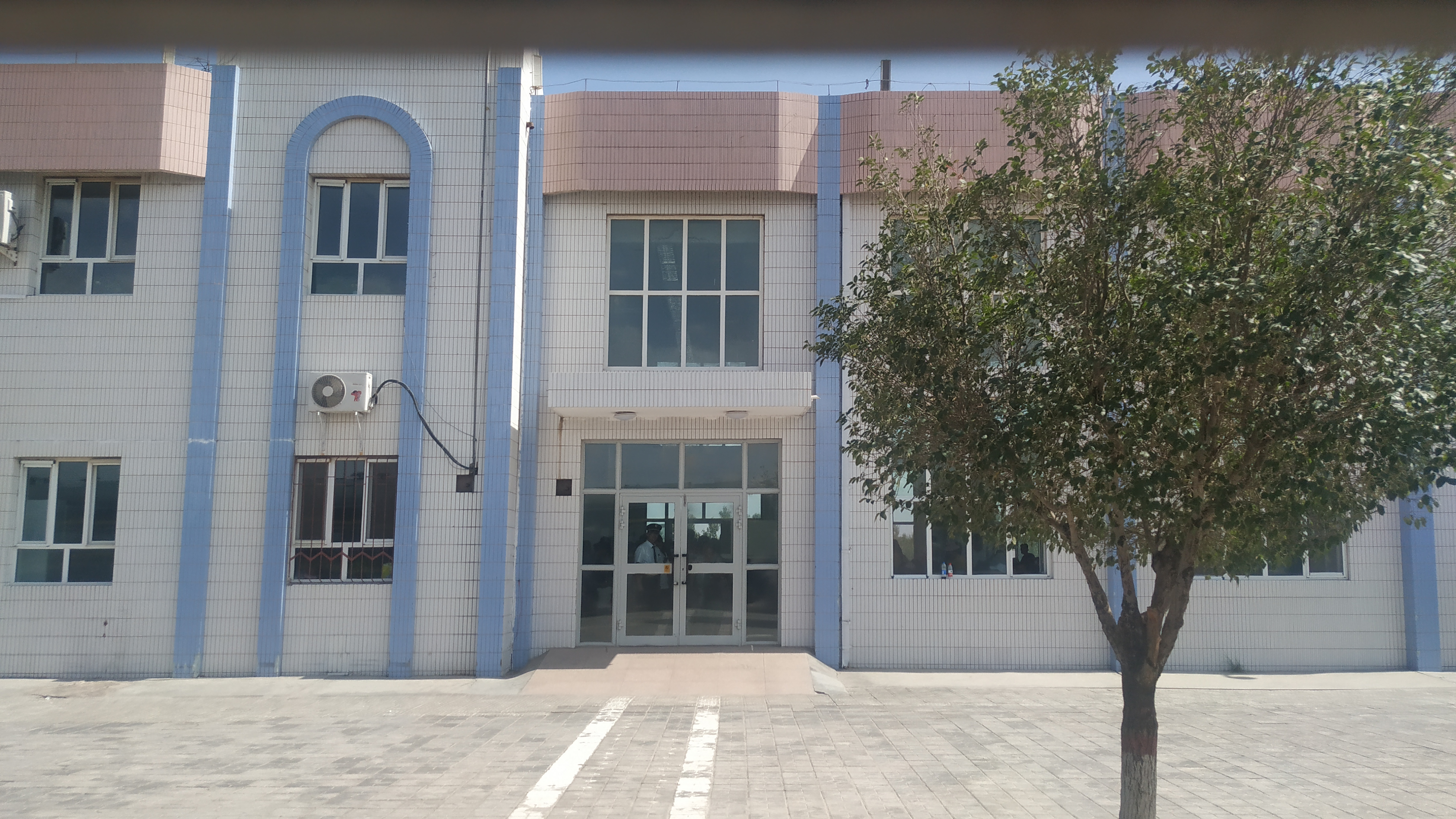
- Railway station

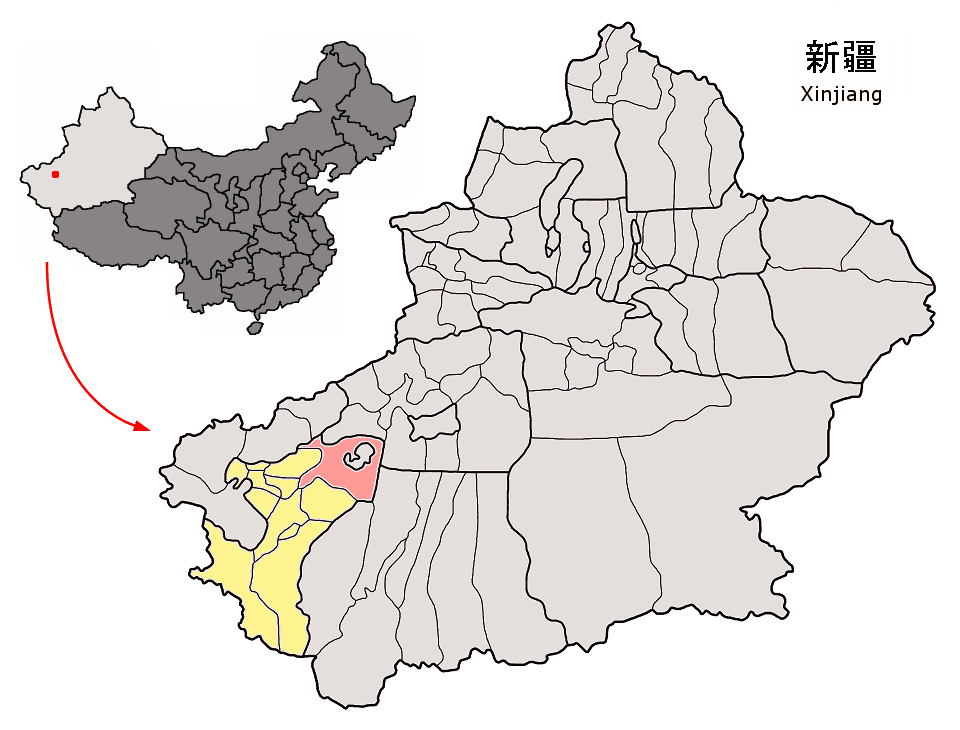
- Location of the county (red) within Kashgar Prefecture (yellow) and Xinjiang

- Location of the seat in Xinjiang Maralbexi (Xinjiang) Maralbexi (China)
- Coordinates: 39°46′43″N 78°34′30″E
- Country: China
- Autonomous region: Xinjiang
- Prefecture: Kashgar
- County seat: Maralbeshi

Area
  - Total: 18,490.59 km^{2} (7,139.26 sq mi)

Population (2020)
  - Total: 366,141
  - Density: 19.8015/km^{2} (51.2856/sq mi)

Ethnic groups
  - Major ethnic groups: Uyghur
- Time zone: UTC+8 (China Standard (Note: Locals in Xinjiang frequently observe UTC+6 (Xinjiang Time), 2 hours behind Beijing.))
- Postal code: 843800
- Website: www.bachu.gov.cn (in Chinese)

Maralbexi County

Uyghur name
- Uyghur: مارالبېشى ناھىيىسى
Transcriptions
- Yengi Yeziⱪ: Maralbexi naⱨiyisi
- SASM/GNC: Maralbexi Nahiyisi
- Siril Yëziqi: Маралбеши наһийиси

Chinese name
- Traditional Chinese: 巴楚縣
- Simplified Chinese: 巴楚县
Transcriptions
Standard Mandarin
- Hanyu Pinyin: Bāchǔ Xiàn
- Wade–Giles: Pa^{1}-ch'u^{3} Hsien4
- IPA: [páʈʂʰù ɕjɛ̂n]

Alternative Chinese name
- Traditional Chinese: 巴爾楚克縣
- Simplified Chinese: 巴尔楚克县
Transcriptions
Standard Mandarin
- Hanyu Pinyin: Bā'ěrchǔkè Xiàn

Second alternative Chinese name
- Traditional Chinese: 瑪熱勒巴什縣
- Simplified Chinese: 玛热勒巴什县
Transcriptions
Standard Mandarin
- Hanyu Pinyin: Mǎrèlēibāshí Xiàn

Maralbexi County (also spelled Maralbeshi, Maralbishi, transliterated from Uyghur: مارالبېشى ناھىيىسى; Chinese: 玛热勒巴什县), also known as Bachu County (Chinese: 巴楚县), is located in the southwest of the Xinjiang Uyghur Autonomous Region, China. The county is under the administration of the Kashgar Prefecture. It has an area of 18,491 km^{2} (7,139 sq mi), and surrounds, but does not administer, the sub-prefecture-level city of Tumxuk. According to the 2002 census, it has a population of 380,000.

== History ==
In 1913, Maralbexi County was established.

In September 1937, two regiments of Soviet Kirghiz troops and one regiment of Russian troops equipped with forty airplanes and twenty tanks entered Sinkiang from Atushe and attacked Maralbexi, dividing Ma Hushan's 36th Corps into two sections.

In February 2002, a 6.7 magnitude earthquake killed 267 people in Maralbexi County and Payzawat County.

On February 24, 2003, the 2003 Bachu earthquake occurred.

In April 2013, twenty-one died in an incident in Seriqbuya.

In October 2014, twenty-two died in an incident at a farmer's market in the county.

== Administrative divisions ==
Maralbexi County includes 4 towns (بازىرى / 镇), 8 townships (يېزىسى / 乡):

Name	Simplified Chinese	Hanyu Pinyin	Uyghur (UEY)	Uyghur Latin (ULY)	Administrative division code
Towns
Maralbeshi Town (Bachu Town)	巴楚镇	Bāchǔ Zhèn	مارالبېشى بازىرى	maralbëshi baziri	653130100
Seriqbuya Town (Selibuya Town)	色力布亚镇	Sèlìbùyǎ Zhèn	سېرىقبۇيا بازىرى	sëriqbuya baziri	653130101
Awat Town (Awati Town)	阿瓦提镇	Āwǎtí Zhèn	ئاۋات بازىرى	Awat baziri	653130102
Achal Town (Sanchakou Town)	三岔口镇	Sānchàkǒu Zhèn	ئاچال بازىرى	Achal baziri	653130104
Townships
Charbagh Township (Qia'erbage Township)	恰尔巴格乡	Qià'ěrbāgé Xiāng	چارباغ يېزىسى	charbagh yëzisi	653130200
Doletbagh Township (Duolaitibage Township)	多来提巴格乡	Duōláitíbāgé Xiāng	دۆلەتباغ يېزىسى	döletbagh yëzisi	653130201
Anarkol Township (Anakule Township)	阿纳库勒乡	Ānàkùlè Xiāng	ئاناركۆل يېزىسى	Anarköl yëzisi	653130202
Shamal Township (Xiamale Township)	夏玛勒乡	Xiàmǎlè Xiāng	شامال يېزىسى	shamal yëzisi	653130203
Aqsaqmaral Township (Akesakemarele Township)	阿克萨克玛热勒乡	Ākèsàkèmǎrèlè Xiāng	ئاقساقمارال يېزىسى	Aqsaqmaral yëzisi	653130204
Alaghir Township (Alagen Township)	阿拉根乡	Ālāgēn Xiāng	ئالاغىر يېزىسى	Alaghir yëzisi	653130205
Chongqurchaq Township (Qiongkuqiake Township)	琼库恰克乡	Qióngkùqiàkè Xiāng	چوڭقۇرچاق يېزىسى	chongqurchaq yëzisi	653130206
Yëngi'östeng Township (Yingwusitang Township)	英吾斯坦乡	Yīngwúsītǎn Xiāng	يېڭىئۆستەڭ يېزىسى	yëngi'östeng yëzisi	653130207

== Transportation ==
Bachu is served by the Southern Xinjiang Railway and G3012 Turpan–Hotan Expressway.

== Economy ==
Agricultural products include corn, cotton, wheat and others as well as sword-leaf dogbane. The central and eastern parts of the county have old desert poplar forests. Animal herding is prominent and rock salt and phosphate fertilizer are produced in the county. Industries include food processing, plastics, rug making, electricity and construction.

As of 1885, there was about 30,600 acres (202,728 mu) of cultivated land in Maralbexi.

== Demographics ==
Historical population
Year	Pop.	±% p.a.
2000	375,883	—
2010	336,274	−1.11%

As of 2015, 363,488 of the 382,186 residents of the county were Uyghur, 17,816 were Han Chinese and 882 were from other ethnic groups.

As of 2019, the population of Maralbexi County was 95.13% Uyghur.

As of 1999, 83.12% of the population of Maralbexi (Bachu) County was Uyghur and 16.41% of the population was Han Chinese.

== Geography ==
=== Climate ===
Climate data for Maralbexi, elevation 1,117 m (3,665 ft), (1991–2020 normals, extremes 1953-present)
Month	Jan	Feb	Mar	Apr	May	Jun	Jul	Aug	Sep	Oct	Nov	Dec	Year
Record high °C (°F)	17.7 (63.9)	21.5 (70.7)	29.8 (85.6)	37.2 (99.0)	38.0 (100.4)	40.2 (104.4)	42.7 (108.9)	42.6 (108.7)	36.8 (98.2)	32.9 (91.2)	23.7 (74.7)	16.3 (61.3)	42.7 (108.9)
Mean daily maximum °C (°F)	0.4 (32.7)	6.9 (44.4)	16.2 (61.2)	24.4 (75.9)	29.0 (84.2)	32.5 (90.5)	33.9 (93.0)	32.4 (90.3)	28.1 (82.6)	21.3 (70.3)	11.6 (52.9)	2.4 (36.3)	19.9 (67.9)
Daily mean °C (°F)	−6.2 (20.8)	0.1 (32.2)	9.3 (48.7)	17.2 (63.0)	21.6 (70.9)	24.9 (76.8)	26.3 (79.3)	25.1 (77.2)	20.5 (68.9)	12.7 (54.9)	3.6 (38.5)	−4.0 (24.8)	12.6 (54.7)
Mean daily minimum °C (°F)	−11.5 (11.3)	−6.0 (21.2)	2.9 (37.2)	10.1 (50.2)	14.7 (58.5)	18.1 (64.6)	19.7 (67.5)	18.8 (65.8)	13.8 (56.8)	5.7 (42.3)	−2.6 (27.3)	−8.9 (16.0)	6.2 (43.2)
Record low °C (°F)	−24.2 (−11.6)	−25.1 (−13.2)	−9.1 (15.6)	−2.5 (27.5)	2.7 (36.9)	6.6 (43.9)	6.6 (43.9)	10.2 (50.4)	2.4 (36.3)	−4.7 (23.5)	−16.2 (2.8)	−22.5 (−8.5)	−25.1 (−13.2)
Average precipitation mm (inches)	0.8 (0.03)	1.2 (0.05)	2.4 (0.09)	3.4 (0.13)	9.7 (0.38)	12.9 (0.51)	19.4 (0.76)	12.6 (0.50)	8.0 (0.31)	2.4 (0.09)	0.8 (0.03)	1.1 (0.04)	74.7 (2.92)
Average precipitation days (≥ 0.1 mm)	1.5	1.2	0.8	1.3	3.2	5.0	6.6	5.0	2.7	1.0	0.4	1.4	30.1
Average snowy days	5.0	2.2	0.3	0	0	0	0	0	0	0	0.7	4.5	12.7
Average relative humidity (%)	64	53	38	31	35	39	44	48	49	50	55	67	48
Mean monthly sunshine hours	161.3	169.6	183.3	214.9	265.6	293.7	300.1	277.8	253.0	249.7	200.0	155.6	2,724.6
Percentage possible sunshine	53	55	49	53	59	66	67	67	69	74	68	54	61
Source 1: China Meteorological Administration
Source 2: Weather Chinaextremesall-time September high

== Notable persons ==
- He Jing (TV presenter)

== Historical maps ==
Historical English-language maps including Maralbexi:

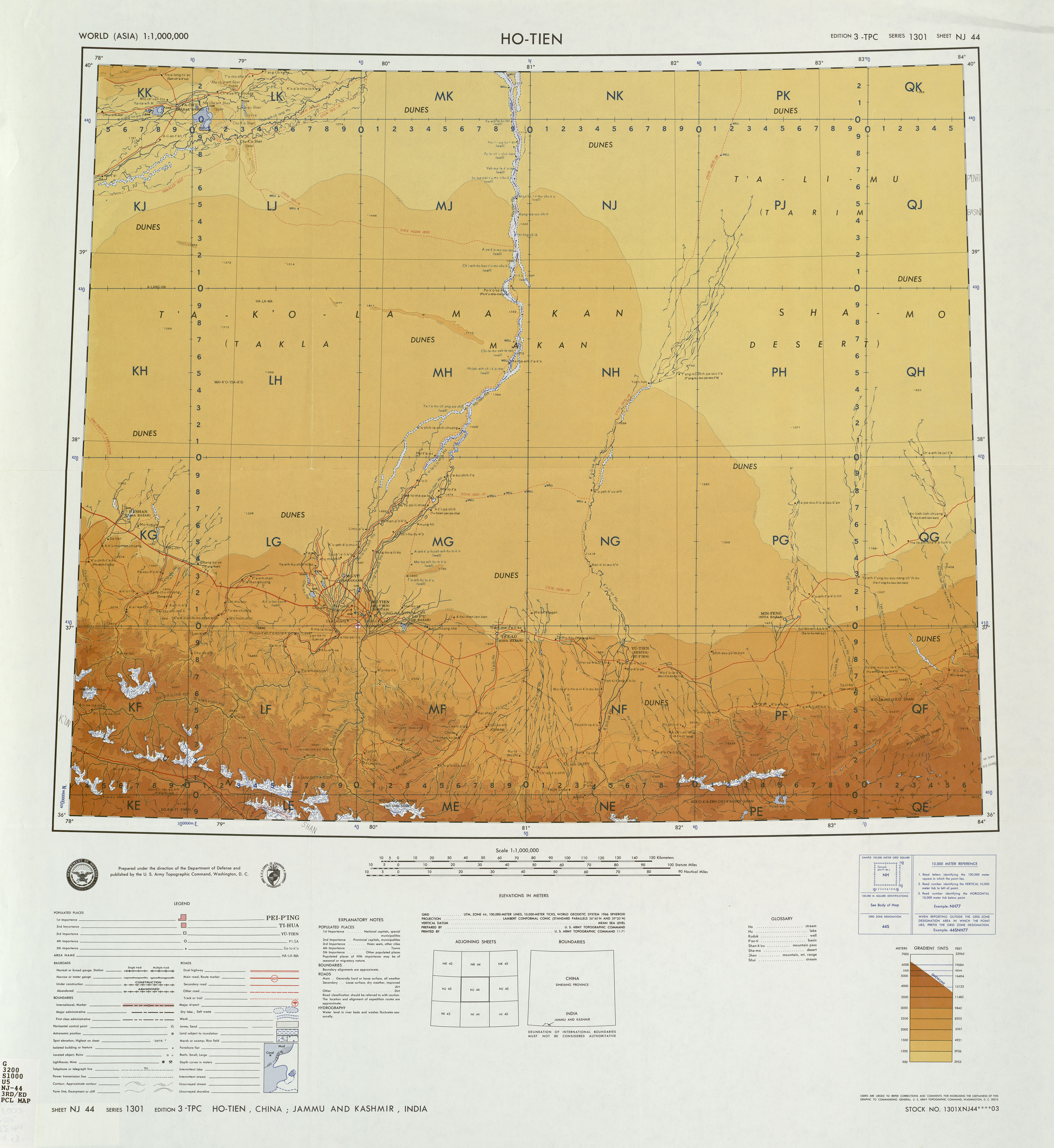
Map including Maralbexi (labeled as PA-CH'U (MARAL BASHI)) (USATC, 1971) (Note: From map: "DELINEATION OF INTERNATIONAL BOUNDARIES MUST NOT BE CONSIDERED AUTHORITATIVE".)

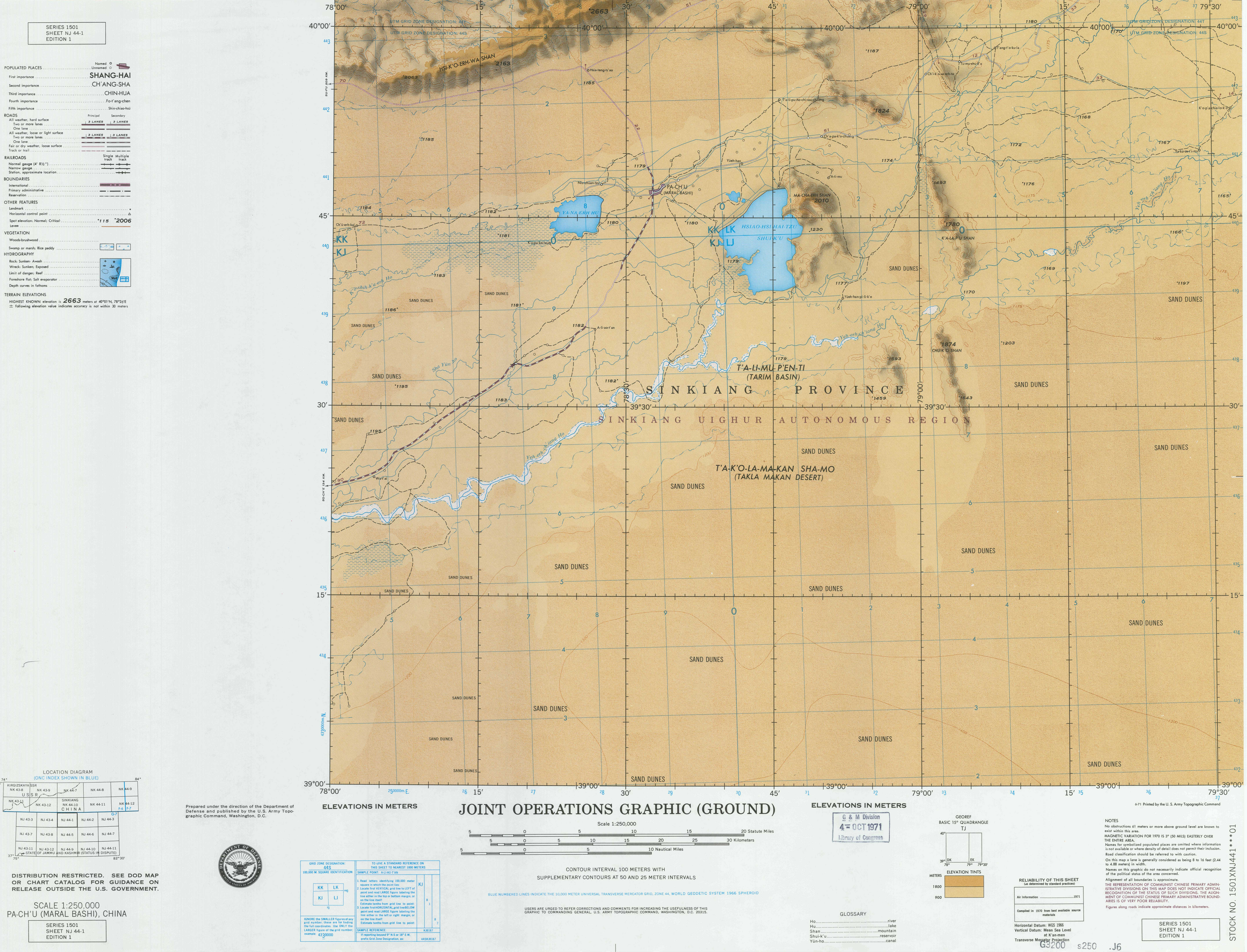
Map including Maralbexi (labeled as PA-CH'U (MARAL BASHI)) (ATC, 1971)

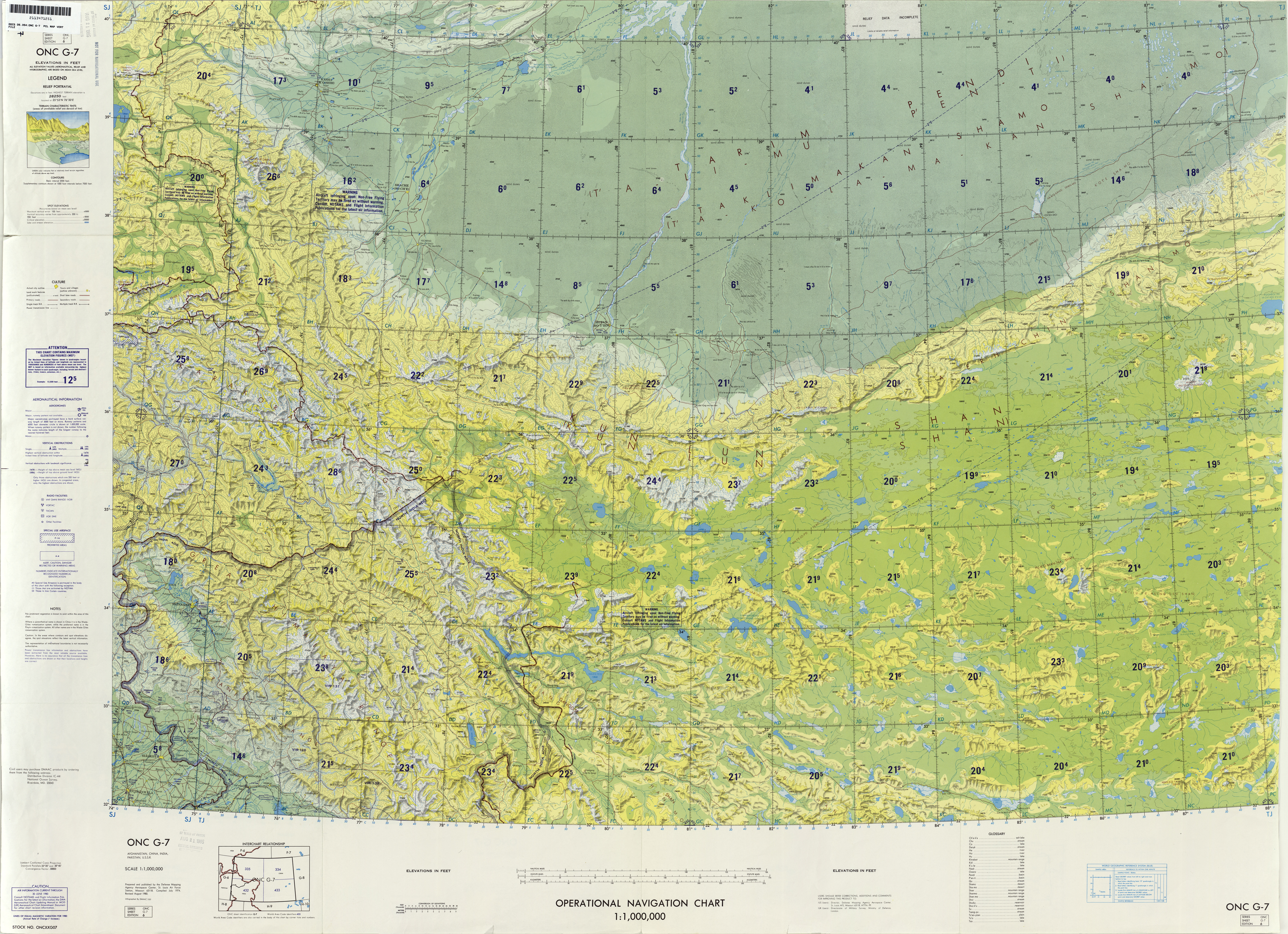
From the Operational Navigation Chart; map including Maralbexi (labeled as BACHU (PA-CH'U)) (DMA, 1980) (Note: From map: "The representation of international boundaries is not necessarily authoritative.")

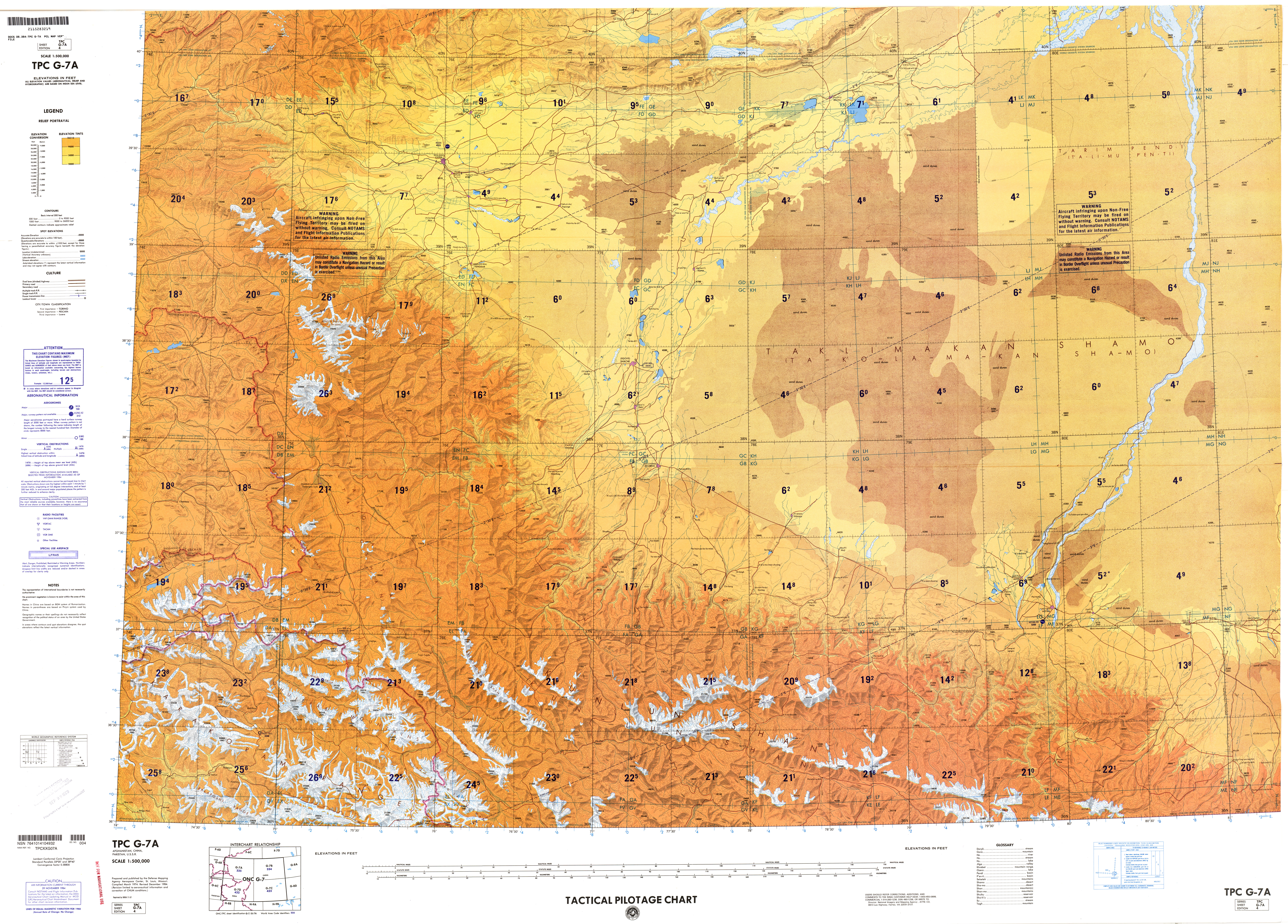
Map including Maralbexi (labeled as BACHU (PA-CH'U)) (DMA, 1984) (Note: From map: "The representation of international boundaries is not necessarily authoritative")

== See also ==
- Yarkand River
