= Naila Al Atrash =

Syrian actress

- Born: Syria
- Occupations: Actress, director, professor

Academic work
- Discipline: Tisch School of the Arts/Drama Department. Middle Eastern and Islamic Studies
- Institutions: New York University

Naila Al Atrash (Arabic: نائلة الأطرش) is a Syrian director, academic and actress in film, television and theater.

She has directed over forty major productions in the Arab World, Europe, Africa and US. She received the best actress award at the Carthage Film Festival for her leading role in Chronicle of the Coming Year. Her work was seen to encourage the public to think in ways that challenged the teachings of the Assad regime, and she left Syria in 2012. In 2019, she was a visiting assistant professor of Middle Eastern and Islamic Studies in New York University with the help of Scholars At Risk.

== Early life ==
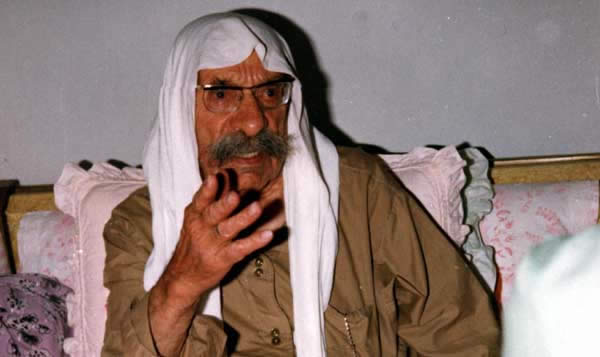
Naila Al Atrash's grandfather, Sultan Pasha al-Atrash. Al Atrash attributed her grandfather as a source of inspiration for her.

Born in Syria, Al Atrash became interested in activism as a teenager, claiming that this is when she started her membership in the communist party. Here, she ran into a direct conflict with her upper-class background. This conflict can be seen as a strong influence in her choices as a director. During her time in the communist party, she began to show interest in political, social, and justice issues, shaping her world view from a young age.

Al Atrash also points to her grandfather, Sultan al-Atrash, as a source of inspiration for her work. As a strong Druze leader, he fought for Syrian independence from France in 1925. He also campaigned for a unified Arab army in order to prevent the establishment of Israel in 1948.

== Education ==
Naila Al Atrash graduated from Bulgaria's High Institute of Dramatic Arts (HIDA) in 1978. She went on to receive her MFA in directing and acting from National Academy of Theatre and Film in Sofia, Bulgaria. At HIDA, Al Atrash directed a show titled "Fire and Olives" by the Egyptian playwright Alfred Farag. This play examined the relationship between Palestinean Jews and Muslims, and how this relationship changed Israel's creation in 1948. It tells the love story of two Palestinians, one an Israelis officer and the other a liberation fighter. Al Atrash said that this play formed a turning point in her relationship with her Bulgarian colleagues. After her graduation, Al Atrash went back to Damascus, Syria's capital. Al Atrash's home was an important part of her life; Syria was where all of her loved ones resided and she felt a need to be there despite the country's increasing instability.

== Career ==
Naila Al Atrash is a director, film, television and theater actress, acting teacher and theater scholar. She received her MFA in directing and acting from National Academy of Theater and Film in Sofia, Bulgaria. She has directed over forty major productions in the Arab World, Europe, Africa and US. Previously she served as head of the acting program at the Hogh Institute of Theatre Arts in Damascus, where she participated in and/or chaired theatre symposia and festival juries. She left Syria in August 2012 when she received a job opportunity in New York University. In 2019, she was a Vivian G Prins Scholar at NYU's Department of Drama, teaching Syrian theater and file, and directing plays with ETW/Tisch School of Arts. She received the best actress award at the Carthage Film Festival for her leading role in Chronicle of the Coming Year.

== Leaving Syria ==
Al Atrash returned home to Syria in 2011, leaving the University of Cape Town where she was teaching. However, because of the increasing power of the Assad regime and their assault against Syrian pro-democratic protesters, opportunities for working in the resistance movement were slowly disappearing. To combat this, Al Atrash and her friends created volunteer relief groups; their goal was to provide support to the displaced and others that were affected by the events.

These groups wanted to focus on providing for children whose schools were destroyed by the events. But, this work was difficult to maintain under the watchful eye of the regime's security apparatus. This work, in combination with her lifetime of strong political attitudes, exposed her to be a direct threat.

Al Atrash became familiar with Scholars At Risk (SAR) while working at New York University in 2008. At this time, Al Atrash was under house arrest in Syria, banned from traveling, and was dismissed from her university position in 2001. This, in turn, inspired her interest with SAR, who proceeded to offer her a job abroad in August 2012. Though a difficult decision to leave her home country, Al Atrash's passion for activism continued to push her further.

Al Atrash has found an interest in theater for therapy. She says that this "kind of theater now is very popular, because it helps people to assimilate to their conditions. When you’re able to tell your story, it balances you. And if you’ve suffered trauma, it can, perhaps, help mitigate that trauma."

== Publications ==
- Sana Mustafa, Naila Al Atrash, & Radwan Ziadeh, We Are Syrians, 2017 ISBN 9781608011339.
