= Jewher Ilham =

American human rights activist

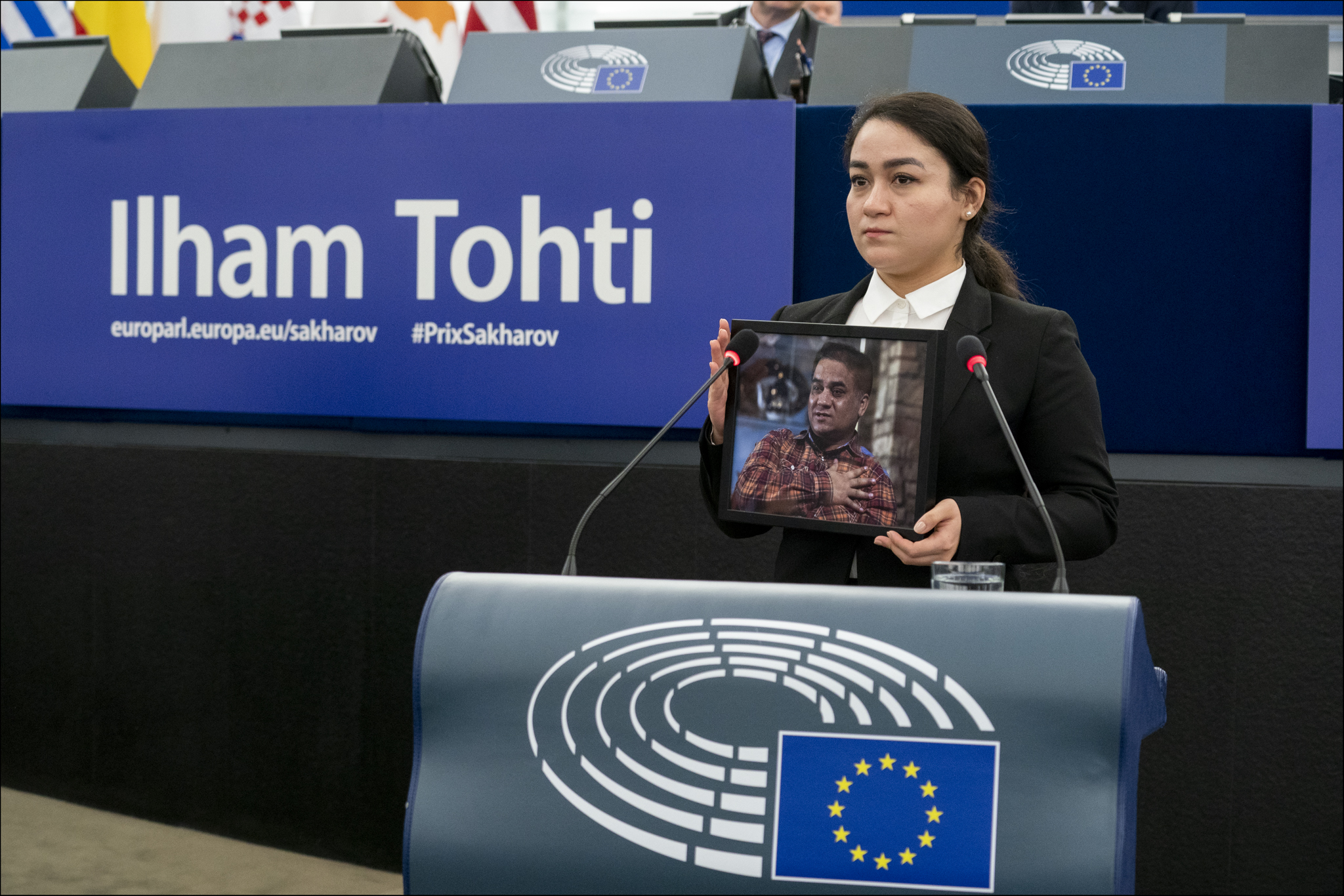
- Education: Indiana University Bloomington (BA)
- Occupation: Human rights activist
- Known for: human rights activism
- Father: Ilham Tohti

Jewher Ilham is a Uyghur human rights activist based in the United States. She is the daughter of Uyghur economist Ilham Tohti.

== Early life and education ==
Ilham was raised in Beijing, China and came to the U.S. in 2013. She holds a BA in political science, Near Eastern languages and cultures, and Central Eurasian studies from Indiana University Bloomington.

== Publications ==
=== Books ===
- Because I Have To: The Path to Survival, The Uyghur Struggle, University of New Orleans Press, 2021 (edited by Adam Braver)

=== Articles ===
- Opinion: My father went to prison for standing up for Uyghurs. Here’s how companies can support his mission, CNN, April 18, 2022
- Only an international effort can put an end to China's crimes in Xinjiang, The Guardian, May 16, 2021 (co-authored with Sophie Richardson)
- A Uighur Father's Brave Fight, The New York Times, May 4, 2014

=== Congressional testimonies ===
- Testimony of Jewher Ilham before the Congressional-Executive Commission on China, February 3, 2022
