= Global Refugee-Led Network =

International non-governmental organization

- Abbreviation: GRN
- Formation: 6 April 2022
- Type: A refugee led Non-governmental organization
- Purpose: Organizing and representing the voice of local and national refugee organizations
- Headquarters: UK
- Website: globalrefugeenetwork.org

The Global Refugee-Led Network (GRN), previously known as the Network for Refugee Voices, is an international not for profit organization that organizes advocacy between local and national refugee organizations.

== Mandate and structure ==
The Global Refugee-Led Network work to make sure that United Nations and other global decision makers are well informed by the voices of refugees.

GPN is organized around six global regions: Africa, Middle East and North Africa, South America, North America, Asia Pacific, and Europe. A representative for each of the six regions form a steering committee. According to a report from the European Council on Refugees and Exiles on the status of refugee-led community organisations (RCOs) published in December 2020 the majority in the European Union are voluntary grassroots organisations (VGOs).

== History ==
The Global Refugee-Led Network was previously known as the Network for Refugee Voices.

The Global Refugee-Led Network participated in the first ever United Nations High Commissioner for Refugees (UNHCR) Global Refugee Forum in 2019.

== Activities ==
The GPN hosts refugee summits to contribute to the UNHCR Global Refugee Forum and collaborates with the UNHCR's Global Youth Advisory Council. GPN was described as "one of the most influential actors" pushing for participation in the Global Refugee Forum by Refugees International in 2019.

On 8 April 2020, the GPN hosted a global conference with over 100 refugee leaders and called for greater inclusion of refugees in policy making.
