= Global Compact for Migration =

UNMlGRAToN

Global Compact for Safe, Orderly and Regular Migration
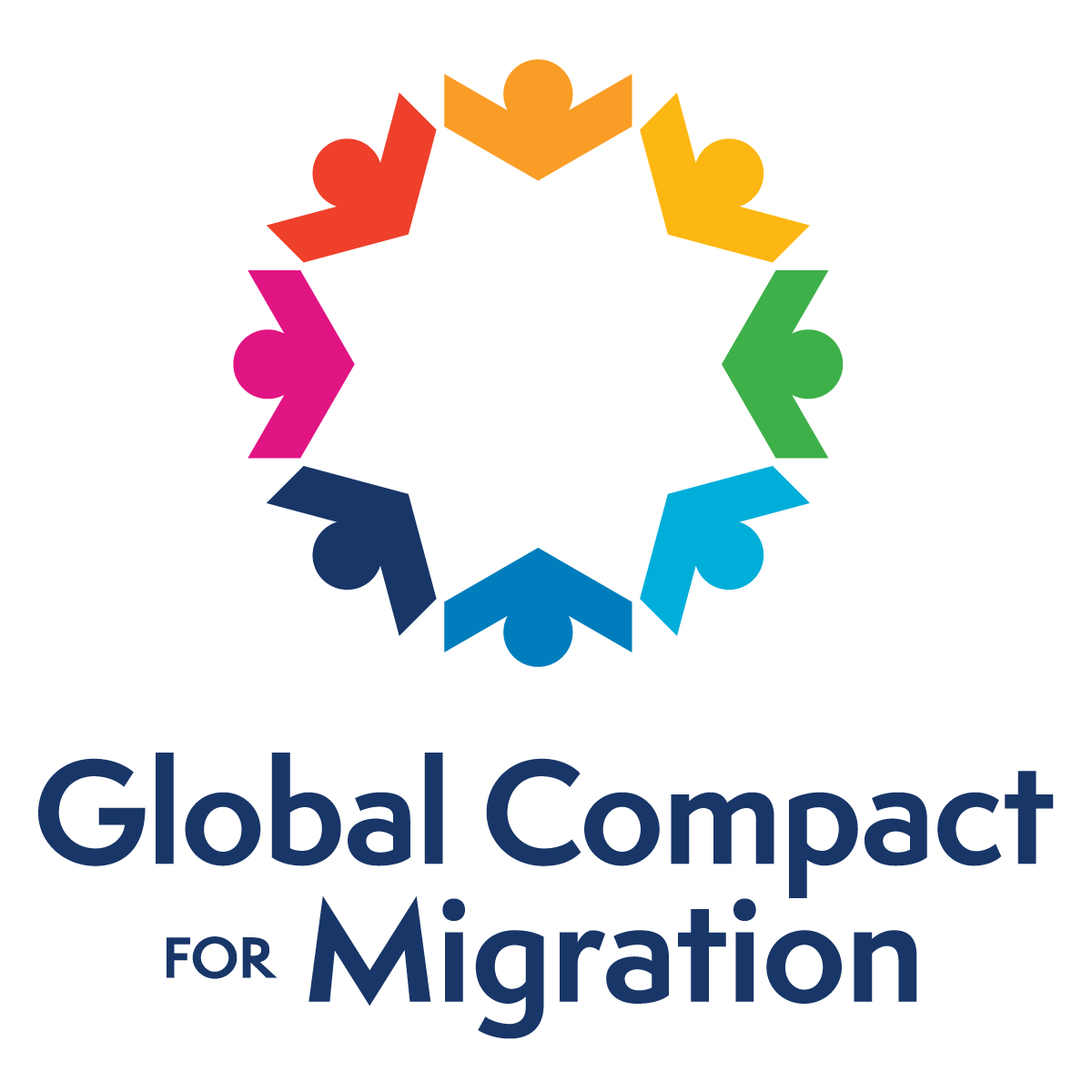
- Drafted: 13 July 2018
- Signed: 19 December 2018
- Location: New York City, United States
- Languages: Arabic, Chinese, English, French, Russian and Spanish

The Global Compact for Safe, Orderly and Regular Migration (GCM) is an intergovernmentally negotiated agreement, prepared under the auspices of the United Nations, that describes itself as covering "all dimensions of international migration in a holistic and comprehensive manner".

The compact was formally endorsed by the United Nations General Assembly on 19 December 2018.

The Compact is a "non-binding cooperative framework", meaning it has limited weight under international law.

== Background ==
On 19 September 2016, the nations of the United Nations General Assembly unanimously adopted the New York Declaration for Refugees and Migrants. The Declaration recognized a need for more cooperation between nations to manage migration effectively. The declaration set off a process leading to the negotiation of the Global Compact for Migration.

A resolution was adopted by the UN General Assembly on 6 April 2017, which decided on the modalities and timeline for the compact. The agreed upon process consisted of the following three phases:

1. Consultations (April–November 2017): six sessions in Geneva, New York City and Vienna
2. Stocktaking (December 2017–January 2018), leading to a first draft ("zero draft")
3. Intergovernmental negotiations (February–July 2018) at the UN headquarters in New York City.

On 9 March 2017, Louise Arbour was appointed by Secretary-General Guterres as his Special Representative for International Migration and was thus tasked with working with the nations and stakeholders to develop the compact.

On 10 December 2018, the document was approved by 164 nations during the Intergovernmental Conference to Adopt the Global Compact for Safe, Orderly and Regular Migration.

On 19 December 2018, the United Nations General Assembly endorsed the compact through a vote. 152 countries voted in favor of the resolution to endorse it, while the United States, Hungary, Israel, Czech Republic and Poland voted against it. 12 countries abstained from the vote.

Result of the vote
In favour	Against	Abstention	Did not vote
152	5	12	24

== Substance of the agreement ==
There are 23 objectives and commitments listed in the draft agreement. These include collecting and using accurate and anonymized data to develop evidence-based migration policy, ensuring that all migrants have proof of identity, enhancing availability and flexibility for regular migration, encouraging cooperation for tracking missing migrants and saving lives, ensuring migrants can access basic services, and making provisions for both full inclusion of migrants and social cohesion.

The draft agreement recognises the principles of national sovereignty:

The Global Compact reaffirms the sovereign right of States to determine their national migration policy and their prerogative to govern migration within their jurisdiction, in conformity with international law. Within their sovereign jurisdiction, States may distinguish between regular and irregular migration status, including as they determine their legislative and policy measures for the implementation of the Global Compact, taking into account different national realities, policies, priorities and requirements for entry, residence and work, in accordance with international law.

The agreement lists actions for governments to draw from, including to "promote independent, objective and quality reporting of media outlets, including internet-based information, including by sensitizing and educating media professionals on migration-related issues and terminology" and to "support multicultural activities through sports, music, arts, culinary festivals, volunteering and other social events".

The agreement makes no distinction between illegal and legal migrants, but does distinguish repeatedly between regular and irregular migrants, affirms the right of states to distinguish between regular and irregular migration status, and commits signatories to "preventing irregular migration". The text does not make a distinction between economic migrants and refugees.

Calling the agreement a "historic moment", General Assembly President Miroslav Lajčák emphasized "It does not encourage migration, nor does it aim to stop it. It is not legally binding. It does not dictate. It will not impose. And it fully respects the sovereignty of States."

== Positions ==
Result of the United Nations General Assembly vote for the endorsement of the Global Compact on 19 December 2018. Voted for Voted against Abstention from voting Did not attend

Australia, Austria, Bulgaria, Chile, the Czech Republic, Dominican Republic, Estonia, Hungary, Italy, Israel, Latvia, Poland, Slovakia and Switzerland did not attend an international conference in the Moroccan city of Marrakesh to adopt the agreement. The United States did not participate in the negotiation of the agreement.

Albania: Albania has signed the document.

Australia: Prime Minister Scott Morrison stated that the agreement could "undermine Australia’s strong border protection laws and practices", and would not sign it.

Belgium: In Belgium, government party N-VA, including its Secretary of State for Migration Theo Francken came out against participating, while the three other government parties remained in favour, creating a political deadlock. All the parties (N-VA, Open Vld, CD&V and MR) did in fact agree on the compact and Charles Michel announced Belgium's favourable position at the General Assembly of the UN on 27 September 2018. Unfavourable election results for N-VA and Austria's position on the compact had the N-VA change its position. On 4 December, the Prime Minister of Belgium, Charles Michel, announced that the issue would be taken to parliament for a vote. On 5 December, parliament voted 106 to 36 in favor of backing the agreement. Michel stated that he would endorse the pact on behalf of the parliament, not on behalf of the divided government. Consequently, N-VA quit the government; the other three parties continued as a minority government (Michel II) that lasted 1 week and led to the fall of the Belgian government on 18 December 2018.

Bosnia and Herzegovina: Bosnia and Herzegovina has signed the document.

Brazil: Affirmed support for the document at the Marrakesh conference, but the Jair Bolsonaro government announced that Brazil would withdraw its support for the document. Citing "immigration must be treated in accordance with the reality and sovereignty of each country", Bolsonaro again confirmed the withdrawal in a ceremony that happened on 2 January 2019. On 8 January 2019, Foreign Minister Ernesto Araújo asked diplomats to inform the UN that Brazil had withdrawn from the Global Compact for Migration. In January 2023, after President Lula took office for his third term under the government slogan "Union and reconstruction", Itamaraty officially communicated the country's return to the Global Compact, reinforcing "the Brazilian Government's commitment to the protection and promotion of the rights of more than 4 million Brazilians living abroad".

Bulgaria: On 5 December, the government announced that it would not sign the agreement; its representatives would vote "abstained".

Chile: On 9 December, the government announced that it would not sign the agreement

Denmark: On 27 November, the Danish Prime Minister Lars Løkke Rasmussen stated that he was supportive of the agreement, but that his government would form a coalition of European countries to create an opt-out.

Dominican Republic: On 4 December 2018, the Dominican government set its position on the Global Migration Pact, stipulating that the Dominican state would not sign the agreement, as reported during a press conference by the legal consultant of the Executive Branch, Flavio Darío Espinal. He also spoke about the participation of the country in the Moroccan summit and announced that the President Danilo Medina would not be in the meeting.

Estonia: The Government of Estonia remained divided on the issue and the country's position was to be decided by the Riigikogu. On 26 November, Riigikogu passed a declaration which supported the compact. According to the Estonian Prime Minister, the declaration would provide the basis for the Governments decision to support the Global Compact for Migration. On 27 November 2018, a spokesperson for the Ministry of Foreign Affairs announced that no Estonian official would be present in Marrakesh. Instead, Estonia's ambassador to the UN would vote in support of the compact on 19 December, during the gathering of the United Nations General Assembly.

Finland: The Finnish Government approved of the final draft in Marrakesh in 2018, and voted for the compact in the UN. The only party to question the treaty was the opposition Finns Party.

Germany: There has been some opposition in the German parliament, led by Alternative for Germany. Merkel's CDU complained the Compact makes no distinction between economic migrants and refugees. However, the parliament voted 372–153 in favour of the compact on 29 November.

Israel: Israel has declined to sign the agreement. Prime Minister of Israel Benjamin Netanyahu stated that "We have a duty to protect our borders against illegal infiltrators. That’s what we’ve done, and that’s what we will continue to do".

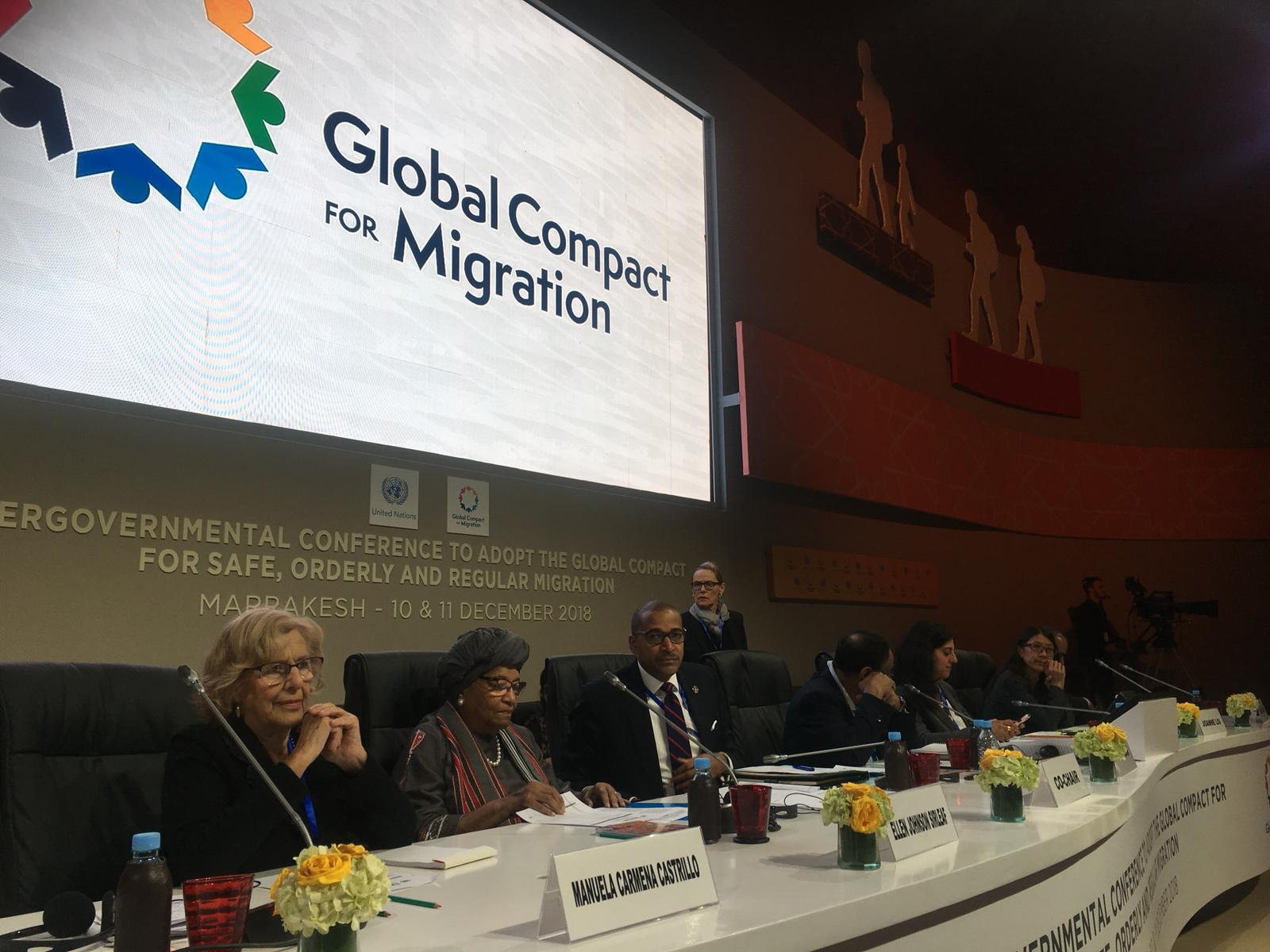
Marrakesh Conference

Italy: The Italian government has decided to not attend the conference in Marrakesh and let the parliament decide whether to adopt the compact.

Latvia: On 6 December 2018, the Latvian parliament voted for rejecting the compact.

Lithuania: On 4 December 2018, the Lithuanian parliament voted for a resolution which acknowledged the need for international cooperation in dealing with the challenges that migration creates and that no state can solve them alone. It also noted that the compact is not legally binding and that the state itself chooses how to implement the goals of the agreement.

Luxembourg: The opposition parties Déi Lénk and the Pirate Party support the pact whereas ADR does not. The Parliament will vote on whether supporting the pact or not.

Montenegro: Montenegro supports the pact.

Netherlands: The Migration Pact led to public debate in the Netherlands after Forum for Democracy asked for a parliamentary debate, based on worries about the supposed "encouragement of migration" and the legal consequences of the signing. On 5 December, a clear majority of the parliament approved the backing of the Migration Pact. The cabinet ensured it would add a legal addendum, which would state that the Migration Pact can not be used as a viable juridical document and therefore can not be used as legal support in asylum claims.

New Zealand: On 19 December 2018, the Labour-led coalition government announced that New Zealand would be voting in favor of the compact after seeking advice from the Crown Law Office and the Ministry of Foreign Affairs and Trade. The Foreign Minister Winston Peters defended his government's decision on the grounds "that the compact was not legally binding and did not restrict New Zealand from setting its own migration policies." The Government's decision was opposed by the opposition National Party leader Simon Bridges who claimed that the compact did not differentiate between legal and illegal migration and could restrict the ability of future governments to set foreign and immigration policy.

Poland: On 9 October 2018, Minister of Interior and Administration Joachim Brudziński spoke against the compact, saying that it went against the priorities of Poland which were security and control over its borders. On 20 November, the government of Poland officially announced that it would not sign the compact.

Romania: On 28 November 2018, the Romanian Foreign Minister was authorized by the Romanian president, Klaus Iohannis, to sign the Migration Pact. Sources say that secret negotiations were carried out long before the news broke out.

Russia signed the compact, but issued a statement repudiating certain elements of it:

We reiterate our repudiation of the "shared responsibility" concept that, in its current form, merely implies sharing the burden of hosting forced migrants between the States that frequently have nothing to do with the causes of mass exodus of people. We are not in favor of shifting the burden to others, while the current complicated migration situation is largely a result of irresponsible interference into the internal affairs of sovereign States of Middle East and North Africa. In this context, the countries that were actively involved in such interference should primarily bear the greatest responsibility, including for the migration-related consequences.

Slovakia: After a dispute broke out within the Government of Slovakia on whether to adopt the framework, it was decided that the issue would be moved to parliament for discussion. Following this, the Slovakian Foreign Affairs Minister, Miroslav Lajčák, announced that he would contemplate his resignation if the parliament rejected the compact. On 29 November 2018, after the parliament had voted to refuse the compact, the Foreign Affairs Minister decided to resign, but later withdrew his resignation. On 5 December, following his cabinets approval of the parliamentary resolution, the Prime Minister of Slovakia, Peter Pellegrini, affirmed that Slovakia would not send a representative to the UN meeting.

Slovenia: Slovenia will endorse the agreement.

Switzerland: Switzerland will not attend the conference for the formal adoption of the framework in December 2018. The decision was made because the parliament demanded a final say on whether the country would approve the compact, which would require more time.

== Criticism ==
The Chancellor of Austria, Sebastian Kurz, stated that the compact would reduce Austria's sovereignty and mix up the difference between illegal and legal immigration as well as that between economic and humanitarian immigration. His vice chancellor, Heinz-Christian Strache, argued that the compact could potentially be interpreted as defining migration as a "human right", which he said "can and must not be the case."

The Australian government has criticized the agreement, claiming that it does not distinguish between legal and illegal migrants, particularly when it comes to welfare. They have also claimed that the compact could impose obligations to support migrants even when they have returned to their country of origin. The Australian government believes that the compact would undermine their current migration policies.

In Finland, while the government and all other parties approved of the treaty, the Finns Party opposed it and demanded a vote in parliament. The provisions disputed by the Finns in parliament are that both legal and illegal immigrants would be bestowed many of the same rights such as rights to basic services, that the treaty would not allow categorical detention of illegal immigrants, and that the treaty would make migration a human right.

Goal 17, which condemns discrimination against migrants, has been criticized due to measures for "shaping the perception of migration". Dutch MEP Marcel de Graaff alleged that the compact would allow to defund news outlets espousing anti-migration rhetoric and that the pact could be used to criminalize political criticism.

A protest march planned by Flemish nationalist groups, was not granted a permit to protest on 17 December by the mayor of Brussels. 5,500 protestors attended the march, notwithstanding the lack of permit. A counter-demonstration of around 1,000 people was organized by NGOs and left-wing groups.

The German newspaper Der Tagesspiegel criticised the German Federal Foreign Office in November 2018 for not explaining why the final version of the compact was different from the last published draft by pointing out that the wording had been changed from migration "could have positive effects" to migration "does have positive effects". The Federal Foreign Office did not give a public explanation at that time. By using the German freedom of information act, the newspaper obtained several documents by May 2019 which revealed demands by some nations to make some aspects of the pact binding. The details of those talks had been removed from the documents by the Foreign Office, in a self proclaimed attempt to prevent damage to Germany's reputation as a reliable partner. Additionally the paper alleged that the Foreign Office had made false or misleading statements to the press and the opposition, by claiming that the negotiations for the pact in New York had been open to the "interested public", while according to the obtained documents, parts of the Compact had been negotiated in closed sessions.

== See also ==
- Global Compact on Refugees
- International Convention on the Protection of the Rights of All Migrant Workers and Members of Their Families, in force since 2003
- International Migrants Day
