= Tianjin Airlines Flight 7554 =

2012 attempted aircraft hijacking

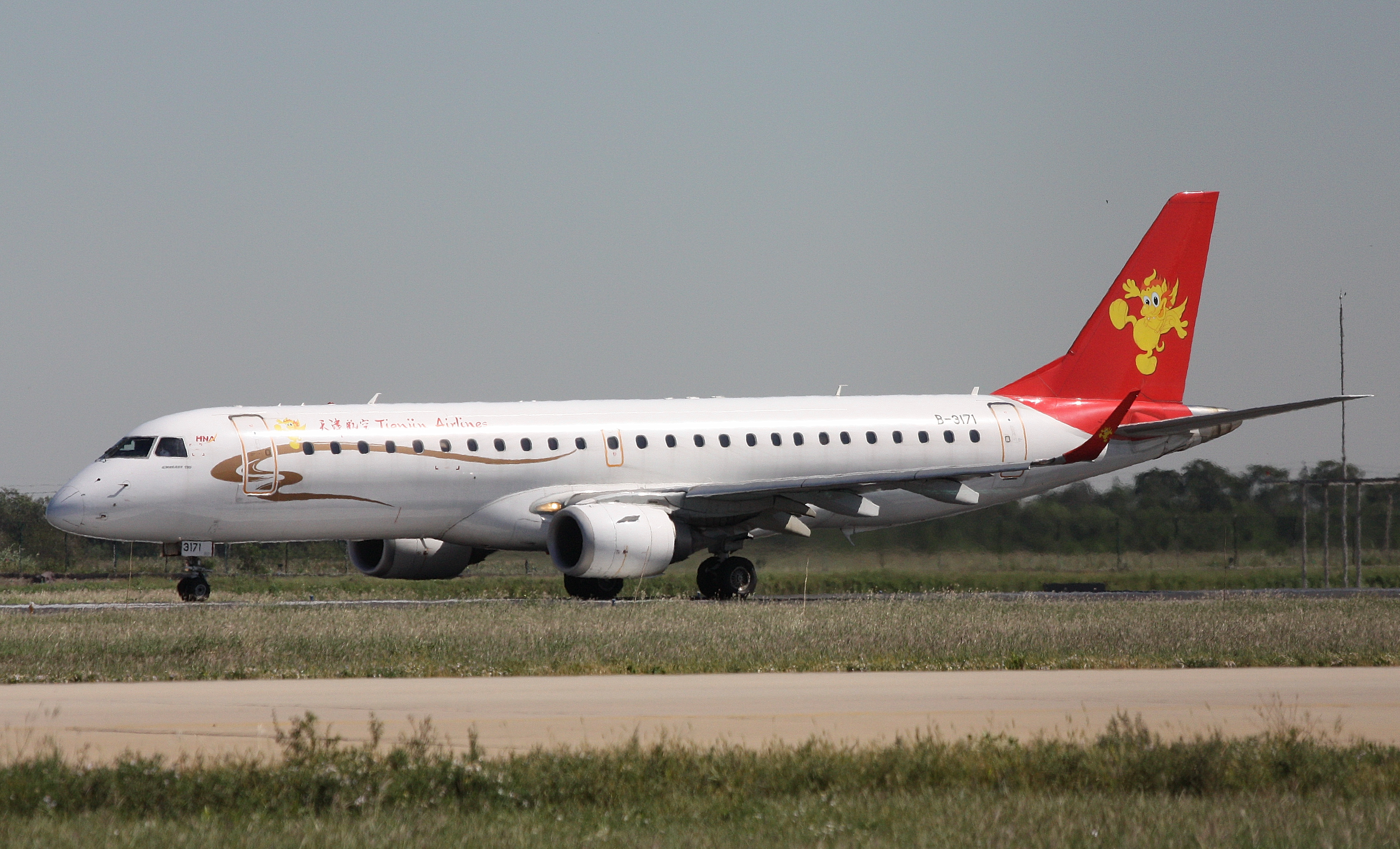
- B-3171, the aircraft involved in the hijacking, a year after the incident.

Incident
- Date: 29 June 2012
- Summary: Attempted hijacking
- Site: En route shortly after departure from Hotan Airport, China

Aircraft
- Aircraft type: Embraer E190
- Operator: Tianjin Airlines
- IATA flight No.: GS7554
- ICAO flight No.: GCR7554
- Call sign: BOHAI 7554
- Registration: B-3171
- Flight origin: Hotan Airport, China
- Destination: Ürümqi Diwopu International Airport, China
- Occupants: 101
- Passengers: 92 (including 6 hijackers)
- Crew: 9
- Fatalities: 2 (hijackers)
- Injuries: 13 (including 2 hijackers)
- Survivors: 99

Tianjin Airlines Flight 7554 was a scheduled domestic passenger flight between Hotan and Ürümqi in China's Xinjiang Autonomous Region. On 29 June 2012, an Embraer E190 operating the flight, took off from Hotan at 12:25 pm; within ten minutes, six ethnic Uyghur men, one of whom allegedly professed his motivation as jihad, announced their intent to hijack the aircraft, according to multiple witnesses. In response, passengers and crew resisted and successfully restrained the hijackers, who were armed with aluminium crutches and explosives.

The aircraft turned around and landed at 12:45 pm back in Hotan, where 11 passengers and crew and two hijackers were treated for injuries. Two hijackers died from injuries from the fight on board. The Xinjiang government classified the incident as terrorism. The Civil Aviation Administration of China (CAAC) reviewed Hotan airport's security measures and airport security was escalated in Xinjiang. The incident marked the first serious hijacking attempt in China since 1990, and the first attempted hijacking that resulted in the deaths of anyone (although only hijackers were killed) since the September 11 attacks.

== Background ==
Hotan is a city with over 360,000 residents, over 97% of them ethnic Uyghur, and is renowned for its Uyghur culture. Ürümqi, over 610 miles (980 km) away, is the comparatively modern capital of the region and holds three million residents. Half the population of Xinjiang as a whole is Uyghur. In September 2011, courts had tried and convicted four people for separatist attacks in Hotan and nearby Kashgar that had killed 32 people. The hijacking took place close to the anniversary of the 5 July 2009 Ürümqi riots which killed 200 people.

Terrorism in China by Uyghur separatists usually features attacks on police stations and civilians; aircraft hijacking is a recent innovation in Uyghur militants' tactics. China has maintained a good aviation safety record, although there has been a history of security threats to aircraft in Xinjiang, mirroring the general violence in the region. Flights from Xinjiang to Afghanistan were grounded in 2008 and 2009 when passengers were discovered to have smuggled explosives on board.

== Incident ==
The Embraer 190 jet was leaving on its daily route from Hotan Airport to Ürümqi Diwopu International Airport at 12:25 pm (04:25 Greenwich Mean Time) with 92 passengers and nine crewmembers. The hijackers, six Uyghur men aged 20–36 from the city of Kashgar, boarded the aircraft normally. Video surveillance showed them feigning disability to bypass airport security; one suspect hid his aluminum pipe weapon inside his crutch. The hijackers donned staff uniforms and split into two parties of three in the front and back of the plane. One of the suspects said they aimed to fly the aircraft out of the country to wage holy war; China has previously raised concerns that Uyghur militants are linking up to their Islamist counterparts in Pakistan.

According to the flight captain, sounds of screaming and fighting emerged from inside the plane at 12:32 pm and 5,700 metres (18,700 ft) above ground. The three hijackers in front were attempting to break down the door to the cockpit, according to the China Daily, injuring a flight attendant who resisted them. Witnesses note that the attackers were armed with the sharp ends of a disassembled aluminum crutch. Simultaneously, the three men in the back brandished metal bars and explosives, beating seated passengers while announcing "whoever stands up will die".

Upon hearing this declaration of intent, Fu Huacheng, a passenger and the minister of education for Lop County, recalled running out of his seat and shouting in Uyghur to his fellow passengers: "Come on! Let's stand up and fight them." Up to six mostly Uyghur plainclothes police responded to Fu's call; microbloggers confirmed witnessing plainclothes policemen removing homemade explosives from the suspects. A group of passengers, led by a local doctor, escorted the elderly and children away from the violence. Some passengers successfully activated the mid-air anti-hijacking contingency plan, which involves pushing a trolley in front of the cockpit door. A passenger interviewed by the Associated Press confirmed that passengers used their belts to restrain the attackers; witnesses to the hijacking posted bloody pictures of the arrests on Sina Weibo.

When the captain heard confirmation from a flight attendant that the events in the cabin were indeed an attempted hijacking and not just a fight, he turned the aircraft back to Hotan. The jet returned safely at Hotan Airport at 12:45 pm. The Civil Aviation Administration of China reported that seven passengers, two security officers, and two flight attendants sustained injuries from the fighting. In addition, two of the hijackers (identified as Ababaykeri Ybelayim and Mametali Yvsup) died from injuries on board; another two of the four detained were taken to the hospital due to self-mutilation.

== Aftermath ==
On its website, the Xinjiang government called the incident "a serious and violent terrorist attack", while Chinese national media called the hijackers "gangsters" and "scoundrels" but refrained from the "terrorist" label. The separatist World Uyghur Congress reacted to the news by claiming variously that the incident was wholly "fictitious" or that it was simply a dispute between ethnic majority Han and Uyghurs over airline seats. The WUC further issued a statement saying, "We warn China not to use this incident as another excuse for crackdown". U.S.-based Investor's Business Daily (IBD) criticized the WUC's denial of the incident, citing "an awful lot of cell phone photographs of the incident and Chinese witness accounts to suggest a hijack attempt". The IBD suggested that the incident as a whole was not favorable to the Chinese government because "the real story is that the hero is no longer the state, but ordinary Chinese."

On 3 July, the Xinjiang government awarded $16,000 each to 10 passengers who fought the hijackers, to reward their bravery. Also, the whole aircrew of the flight was awarded 500,000 yuan by the Xinjiang government. The flight crewmembers were rewarded 1 million yuan ($157,000) by the CAAC for their bravery. Two security members on board the flight, Du Yuefeng and Xu Yang, and flight attendant Guo Jia, were named heroes by China's civil aviation authorities.

Two days later, 5 July, Xinjiang officials announced new airport security measures, which included the requirement that passengers present hospital-issued certificates before bringing crutches onto an aircraft. Daily flights from Hotan to Ürümqi resumed on 3 July. The Civil Aviation Administration of China reported on 6 July that an investigation found Hotan airport staff not guilty of dereliction of duty.

Three of the surviving terrorists, Musa Yvsup, Arxidikali Yimin, and Eyumer Yimin, were sentenced to death after they pleaded guilty on Tuesday 11 December 2012. Alem Musa, who also participated in the hijacking attempt but did little compared to the others, also pled guilty and was sentenced to life imprisonment by Intermediate People's Court in Hotan Prefecture.
