= 2011 Xinjiang attacks =

2011 Xinjiang insurgency or 2011 Xinjiang attacks may refer to:

- 2011 Hotan attack on July 18
- 2011 Kashgar attacks on July 30-31
