= Urumqi Foreign Economic Relations and Trade Fair =

Annual trade fair in Ürümqi, Xinjiang, China

Urumqi Foreign Economic Relations and Trade Fair (Chinese: 乌鲁木齐对外经济贸易洽谈会), commonly abbreviated as Urumqi Fair (Chinese: 乌洽会), is an annual trade fair held in Urumqi of Xinjiang, China, since it was started on September 2, 1992. Its purpose is to promote trading and market exploration in Northwestern China with foreign countries mainly in Central Asia. Urumqi Fair is the largest trade fair in Western China.

During the 17th Urumqi fair in September 2008, it was the first time that the fair saw participants from the Ministry of Commerce and the China Council for Promotion of International Trade. The last fair was held in 2010 before the event was upgraded to become the first China-Eurasia Expo in 2011.

== Management ==
Key sectors include energy, agriculture, and digital infrastructure, with a dedicated "Silk Road Economic Belt" zone since 2015. It features include bilingual (Chinese-Russian) negotiation platforms and a "Green Corridor" for streamlined customs clearance across 18 Eurasian countries.

The fair hosts Central Asian folk art exhibitions and halal food expos, reflecting Xinjiang's multicultural identity. Co-organized by China's Ministry of Commerce and the Xinjiang government, it transitioned to a hybrid (online-offline) format in 2020, integrating blockchain-based contract signing. Recent editions emphasize renewable energy partnerships, aligning with China's carbon neutrality goals.

== See also ==
- Canton Fair
