= List of SAARC countries by HDI =

This list presents the Human Development Index values of the SAARC member states, along with their inequality-adjusted HDI scores. According to the most recent UNDP report, Sri Lanka ranks highest in the region with an HDI of 0.766, while Afghanistan ranks lowest at 0.496. The inequality-adjusted figures show the same pattern, with Sri Lanka remaining at the top with 0.630 and Afghanistan again recording the lowest value at 0.321.

== Standard HDI ==
=== List ===
HDI map of the SAARC 2023 0.700 to 0.799 0.650 to 0.699 0.600 to 0.649 0.500 to 0.599 0.500>

HDI 2023 data (2025 report) rankings
Rank	Country	HDI
Members
High Human Development
1	Sri Lanka	0.776
2	Maldives	0.766
―	World (average)	0.756
Medium human development
3	Bhutan	0.698
4	Bangladesh	0.685
4	India	0.685
―	SAARC (average)	0.659
6	Nepal	0.622
Low human development
7	Pakistan	0.544
8	Afghanistan	0.496

=== Map ===
This map displays the Human Development Index of each SAARC member state. The color indicators are as follows:

High Human Development Medium Human Development Low Human Development

== Inequality-adjusted HDI ==
=== List ===
IHDI 2023 data (2025 report) rankings
Rank	Country	IHDI
Medium human development
1	Sri Lanka	0.630
2	Maldives	0.602
Low human development
―	World (average)	0.590
3	Bangladesh	0.482
4	Bhutan	0.478
5	India	0.475
―	SAARC (average)	0.474
6	Nepal	0.437
7	Pakistan	0.364
8	Afghanistan	0.321

=== Map ===
This map displays the inequality-adjusted Human Development Index of each country, The color indicators are as follows:

Medium Human Development Low Human Development

== Planetary-pressures-adjusted HDI ==
=== List ===
PHDI 2023 data (2025 report) rankings
Rank	Country	PHDI
High human development
1	Sri Lanka	0.754
Medium human development
―	World (average)	0.680
2	Bangladesh	0.666
3	India	0.656
―	SAARC (average)	0.611
4	Bhutan	0.593
5	Nepal	0.592
6	Pakistan	0.529
7	Afghanistan	0.492
No data
8	Maldives	N/A

=== Map ===
This map displays the Planetary pressures-adjusted Human Development Index of each country, The color indicators are as follows:

High Human Development Medium Human Development Low Human Development No Data

== See also ==
- Economy of South Asia
- Indian subcontinent
- South Asia
