= China International Consumer Goods Fair =

Consumer goods fair in China

China International Consumer Goods Fair (Chinese: 中国国际日用消费品博览会; CICGF) is the largest professional consumer goods fair in China, which ranks only second to Canton Fair among all the exhibitions sponsored by China's Ministry of Commerce. It is approved by the China State Council, and is co-sponsored by Ministry of Commerce and the government of Zhejiang Province.

The first fair took place in 2002, hosted 1,750 booths, and had over 7,200 overseas visitors. The fair started its online platform in 2003.

CICGF is held in the harbor city of Ningbo in June of every year. Products from many industries are showcased. Industries include home appliances and electronics, textiles, sports and recreational products, and household products and gifts.
