= Economy of South Asia =

Statistics
- Population: ▲2 billion (2022)
- GDP: ▲$6.03 trillion (nominal; 2026); ▲$23.87 trillion (PPP; 2026)
- GDP growth: ▲5.8% (2026f)
- GDP per capita: ▲$2,920 (nominal; 2026); ▲$13,558 (PPP; 2026)
- Inflation (CPI): ▼4.6% (2026)
- Unemployment: ▼7% (2022)

Public finance
- Government debt: ▲78.8% of GDP (2023e)
- Most numbers are from the International Monetary Fund. IMF South Asia Datasets All values, unless otherwise stated, are in US dollars.

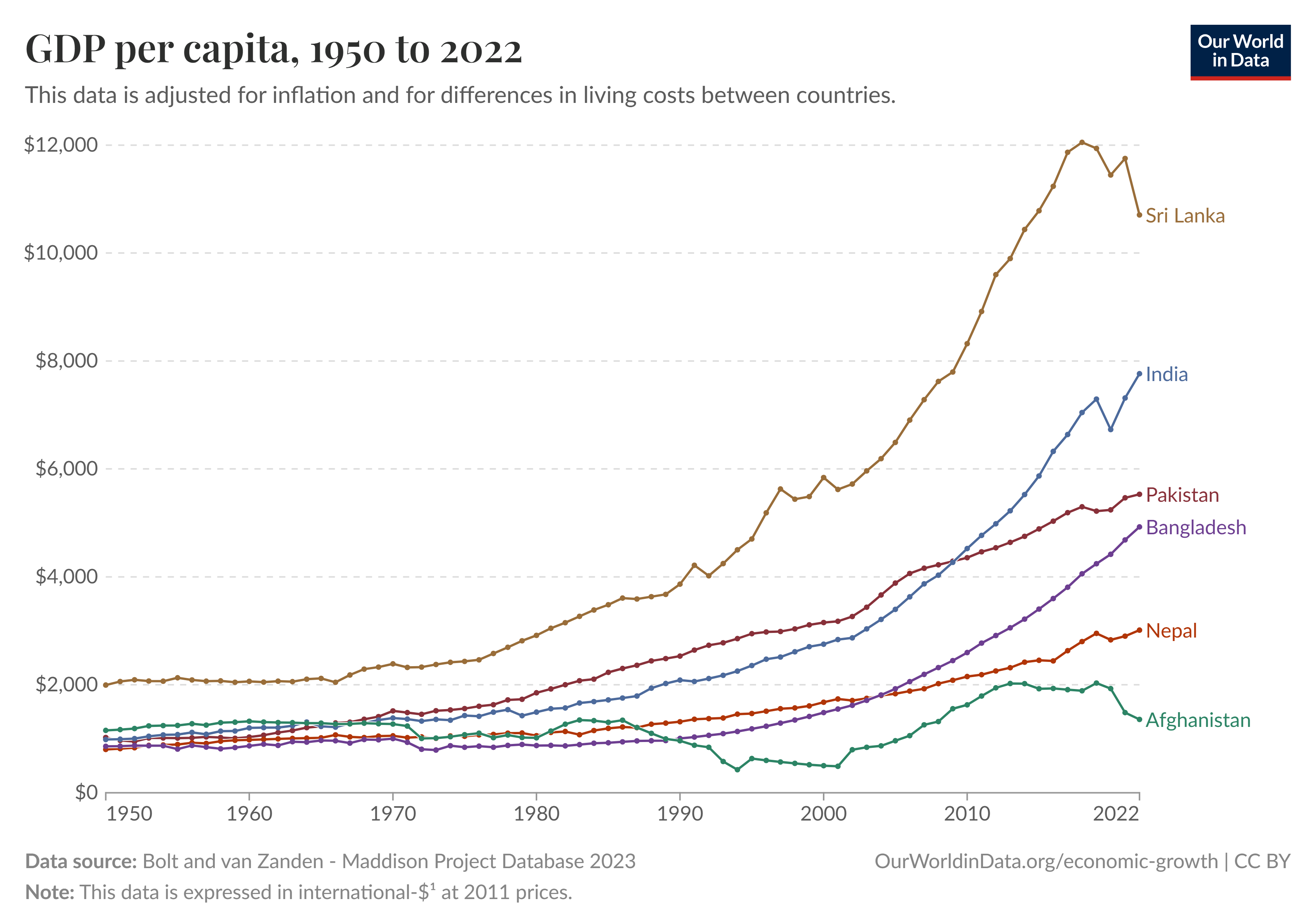
GDP per capita development in South Asia from 1950 to 2022

The subregion of South Asia, within the Asian continent, maintains a diversified developing economy consisting of eight countries. With a population of 2 billion people, the region is home to 25% of the world population. The Indian subcontinent was historically one of the richest regions in the world, accounting for 25% of world GDP as recently as 1700, but experienced significant de-industrialisation and a doubling of extreme poverty during the colonial era of the late 18th to mid-20th century. In the post-colonial era, South Asia has grown significantly, with India advancing because of economic liberalisation from the 1980s onwards, and extreme poverty now below 15% in the region. South Asia has been the fastest-growing region of the world since 2014.

With projected growth rates of about 6.0% from 2025, South Asia continues to face significant economic challenges. A notable slowdown in private investment, especially in key sectors such as manufacturing and services, poses a major concern. Additionally, persistent employment issues, particularly low female workforce participation, highlight broader socio-economic disparities. The region is also critically vulnerable to climate-related impacts, including flooding and heatwaves, which significantly affect the agricultural sector—a fundamental component of local economies. This environmental susceptibility strains the already limited capacity of the public sector to adapt, increasing dependence on resilience initiatives from local businesses, farmers, and vulnerable communities.

== History ==
=== Ancient and medieval era ===
The Indus Valley Civilisation, the early civilisation of India and Pakistan, developed an economy based on agriculture and craft that later spread into central India. Angus Maddison estimates that from 1-1000 AD, the regions making up present-day India contributed roughly 30% of the world's population and GDP. India experienced per-capita GDP growth in the high medieval era.

By the late 17th century, the Mughal Empire under Aurangzeb reached its greatest extent and controlled most of South Asia by the time of Aurangzeb's death in 1707. The Indian economy, Maddison estimates, produced about 27% of global GDP by the early 18th century under Aurangzeb's reign.

Until the 18th century, India was one of the most important manufacturing centres in international trade. This manufacturing growth is often seen as a form of proto-industrialisation, similar to 18th-century Western Europe before the Industrial Revolution. According to Jeffrey Williamson, the Indian subcontinent deindustrialised in the latter half of the 18th century as an indirect outcome of the collapse of the Mughal Empire, and British rule later caused further deindustrialisation.

India experienced deindustrialisation and the cessation of various craft industries under British rule, which, along with fast economic and population growth in the Western world, resulted in India's share of the world economy declining from 23% in 1700 to 4.2% in 1950, and its share of global industrial output declining from 23% in 1750 to 2% in 1900. Because of its ancient history as a trading zone and later its colonial status, colonial India remained economically integrated with the world, with high levels of trade, investment, and migration.

=== Colonial era ===
The role and scale of British imperial policy during the British Raj (1858 to 1947) on India's relative decline in global GDP remains a topic of debate among economists, historians, and politicians. Some commentators argue that the effect of British rule was negative, and that Britain engaged in a policy of deindustrialisation in India for the benefit of British exporters, which left Indians relatively poorer than before British rule. Others argue that Britain's impact on India was either broadly neutral or positive, and that India's declining share of global GDP was due to other factors, such as new mass production technologies or internal ethnic conflict.

== Contemporary era ==
=== Post-colonial era ===
A 1959 map showing how most of Asia was communist (in red), with Pakistan (blue) being more aligned with capitalist powers than India. The resulting Cold War dynamics impacted South Asian geoeconomics in the late 20th century.

In the aftermath of in the late 1940s and the Indian subcontinent's independence from British rule, Pakistan chose to have a more capitalistic economy and aligned itself more closely with the United States, while India went with a more closed economy dubbed as the "License Raj" and eventually aligned more closely with the Soviet Union. Rising economic inequality and misrule by West Pakistan towards East Pakistan contributed to the 1971 independence of Bangladesh, however. Both India and Pakistan then went through a period of economic liberalisation in the 1980s and '90s, which resulted in India going from having around half of Pakistan's GDP per capita in 1990 to surpassing Pakistan by the 2010s. Bangladesh, which had started off substantially poorer than both India and Pakistan at the time of its independence, has grown substantially, and has also surpassed Pakistan's GDP per capita.

=== Recent decades ===
India is the largest economy in the region (US$4.11 trillion) and makes up almost 80% of the South Asian economy; it is the world's 5th largest economy in nominal terms and the world's 3rd largest economy by purchasing power adjusted exchange rates (US$14.26 trillion). India is the member of G-20 major economies and BRICS from the region. It is the fastest-growing major economy in the world and one of the world's fastest registering a growth of 7.2% in FY 2022–23. In 2026, global economic trends are expected to continue shaping South Asia's growth outlook, with shifting trade dynamics and financial conditions influencing regional prospects.

India is followed by Bangladesh, which has a GDP of ($446 billion).

a. It is one of the emerging and growth-leading economies of the world, and is also listed among the Next Eleven countries. It is also one of the fastest-growing middle-income countries. It has the world's 33rd largest GDP in nominal terms and is the 27th largest by purchasing power adjusted exchange rates (476015 trillion). Bangladesh's economic growth was 6.4% in 2022. Pakistan has an economy of ($379 billion nominal GDP. Next is Sri Lanka, which has the 2nd highest GDP per capita and the 4th largest economy in the region.

While in East Asia, regional trade accounts for 50% of total trade, it accounts for only a little more than 5% in South Asia. Certain parts of South Asia are significantly wealthier than others; the four Indian states of Maharashtra, Tamil Nadu, Gujarat and Karnataka are projected to account for almost 50% of India's GDP by 2030, while the five South Indian states comprising 20% of India's population are expected to contribute 35% of India's GDP by 2030.

The major stock exchanges in the region are Bombay Stock Exchange (BSE) with market Capitalization of $3.8 trillion (8th largest in the world), National Stock Exchange of India (NSE) with market capitalization of $3.27 trillion (9th largest in the world), Dhaka Stock Exchange (DSE), Colombo Stock Exchange (CSE), and Pakistan Stock Exchange (PSX) with market capitalization of $72 billion. Economic data is sourced from the International Monetary Fund, current as of April 2017, and is given in US dollars.

India is home to the Indian Premier League, which is the second-most valued sports league in the world on a per-match basis.

== National economies ==
=== Poverty ===
Poverty rates vary greatly throughout the region, with a majority of Afghanistan relying on humanitarian aid, and 40% of Sri Lankans slipping into poverty due to the economic crisis that started in 2019.

Country	Population below poverty line (at $1.9/day)				Global Hunger Index (2021)	Population under-nourished (2015)	Life expectancy (2019) (global rank)	Global wealth report (2019)		
Country	World Bank (year)	2022 Multidimensional Poverty Index Report (MPI source year)	Population in Extreme poverty (2022)	CIA Factbook (2015)	Global Hunger Index (2021)	Population under-nourished (2015)	Life expectancy (2019) (global rank)	Total national wealth in billion USD (global rank)	Wealth per adult in USD	Median wealth per adult in USD (global rank)
Afghanistan	54.5% (2016)	55.91% (2015–16)	18%	36%	28.3 (103rd)	26.8%	63.2 (160th)	25 (116th)	1,463	640 (156th)
Bangladesh	24.3% (2016)	24.64% (2019)	4%	31.5%	19.1 (76th)	16.4%	74.3 (82nd)	697 (44th)	6,643	2,787 (117th)
Bhutan	8.2% (2017)	37.34% (2010)	4%	12%	No data	No data	73.1 (99th)	No Data	No Data	No Data
India	21.9% (2011)	14.9% (2019–21)	0.9%	29.8%	27.5 (101st)	15.2%	70.8 (117th)	12,614 (7th)	14,569	3,042 (115th)
Maldives	8.2% (2016)	0.77% (2016–17)	4%	16%	No data	5.2%	79.6 (33rd)	7 (142nd)	23,297	8,555 (74th)
Nepal	25.2% (2010)	17.50% (2019)	8%	25.2%	19.1 (76th)	7.8%	70.9 (116th)	68 (94th)	3,870	1,510 (136th)
Pakistan	24.3% (2015)	38.33% (2017–18)	5%	12.4%	24.7 (94th)	22%	69.3 (144th)	465 (49th)	4,096	1,766 (128th)
Sri Lanka	4.1% (2016)	2.92% (2016)	5%	8.9%	16 (65th)	22%	76.9 (54th)	297 (60th)	20,628	8,283 (77th)

=== India ===
India has a developing market-oriented economy with substantial state participation in strategic sectors. As of October 2026, it is the world's sixth-largest economy by nominal GDP and the third-largest by purchasing power parity (PPP). By per capita income, the nation ranks 151st by nominal GDP and 122nd by PPP-adjusted GDP as of 2026. From independence in 1947 until 1991, economic development was characterised by protectionist economic policies, with extensive state intervention, central planning, public ownership of key industries, and regulation. An acute balance-of-payments crisis in 1991 led India to adopt broad economic liberalisation.

Nearly 70% of India's GDP comes from domestic consumption, and the nation consistently the world's third-largest consumer market. As of 2025, the service sector accounts for around 55% of GDP. Beyond private consumption, India's GDP is driven by government spending, investments, and exports. As of 2025, India is the world's 7th-largest importer and the 10th-largest exporter. India is often described as the "pharmacy of the world", supplying around one-fifth of global demand for pharmaceuticals to over 200 countries. India is the world's largest vaccine manufacturer by volume, accounting for over 60% of the global production. India is the world's fifth-largest manufacturer, representing 3.2% of global manufacturing output. India's digital economy was estimated to be 11.7% of GDP, with its total value expected to surpass US$1 trillion by 2029. Nearly 63% of India's population lives in rural areas, which generate about 46% of Indian GDP.

India has been a member of the World Trade Organization (WTO) since 1995. It ranks 44th in the IMD World Competitiveness Ranking 2026 and 38th in the Global Innovation Index 2026. As of 2025, India ranks third in the world in total number of billionaires. The World Bank's consumption-based Gini coefficient for India fell from 28.8 in 2011-12 to 23 by 2022-23, India's social welfare spending stood at 8.6% of GDP in 2022. It has two of the world's ten largest stock exchanges. India has free-trade agreements with many countries and blocks, including the European Union and is a member of numerous economic organisations. India is a lower-middle income; its population has been the largest in the world since the mid-2020s.

Amid scrutiny of India's economic growth figures, the IMF said in October 2026 that the country's revised GDP estimation methodology was consistent with international standards, following the introduction of a new GDP series in February 2026 that shifted the base year from 2011–12 to 2022–23 and incorporated methodological changes intended to improve the accuracy of economic estimates. Studies by Indian think tanks describe a heavy compliance and criminal-penalty burden on businesses, which the government has begun to address through decriminalisation and the consolidation of labour laws. The IMF has called for continued fiscal consolidation, with general government debt at about 82% of GDP.

=== Bangladesh ===
The economy of Bangladesh is a developing, market-oriented economy. In the 2025–26 fiscal year its nominal GDP was estimated at US$501 billion, making it the second-largest economy in South Asia. As of year 2026, it ranked 36th in nominal terms and 26th by purchasing power parity.Bangladesh is a member of the World Trade Organization and the South Asian Free Trade Area, and Bangladesh was recognized by Goldman Sachs as a member of the Next Eleven, in 2012.

Economic reforms promoting free markets and foreign direct investment began in the late 1970s. Since the 1990s, the ready-made garments industry has become the country's main export sector, accounting for over 80% of total exports. Remittances from the Bangladeshi diaspora are a major source of foreign exchange, and the pharmaceutical industry supplies 98% of domestic demand. Agriculture is supported by government subsidies. The private sector accounts for about 80% of GDP, and small and medium-sized enterprises (SME) make up about 90% of businesses.

GDP growth slowed to 3.49% in FY2024–25. The BBS’s provisional estimate for FY2025–26 is around 3.6% to 4.7%. The economy faces challenges including low tax revenue (roughly 8% to 9% of GDP in recent fiscal years), a non-performing loans in the banking sector, and structural infrastructure bottlenecks affecting uneven industrial growth. Bangladesh is scheduled to graduate from least developed country status on 24 November 2029.

=== Pakistan ===
Pakistan has a developing capitalist economy with a large agriculture sector. It is the 40th-largest in terms of nominal GDP and the 20th-largest economy by purchasing power parity (PPP) as of 2026. In per capita terms, the Pakistani economic output ranks 160th by nominal GDP and 138th by PPP GDP. Economic development in Pakistan is varied with growth centers located along the Indus River. Major urban centers with diversified economies include Karachi and the broader Punjab region, including Faisalabad, Lahore, Sialkot, Rawalpindi, and Gujranwala. With a large population exceeding 250 million, Pakistan is sensitive to immigration, natural disasters and regional armed conflict.

Historically reliant on its private sector, Pakistan underwent nationalization in the 1970s, with a focus on its financial services, manufacturing, and transportation industries. It converted to an Islamic economic system in the following decade, outlawing economic practices forbidden under Shari'a law. During the 1990s, the underdeveloped Pakistani economy began to privatize strategic sectors again becoming a semi-industrial nation by the 21st century. It has been dependent on agriculture and its textile industry for the majority their foreign exports. Pakistan has endured a variety of economic and financial crises, with the nation recovering from a protracted malaise since 2025.

Pakistan's public finances have been strained by a sustained depreciation of the Pakistani rupee, its official currency. With a debt-to-GDP ratio of 70% to 80% as of 2026, servicing public debt occasionally reaches two-thirds of government spending. The country has historically shared a deep trading relationship with China who is both their top import and export partner. Pakistan is a lower-middle income country with much of its modern economic development focused on improving standards of living for its population. It ranks among the lower GDP per capita output nations in the world, with poverty in the country a recurrent focal point in public affairs.

=== Afghanistan ===
Afghanistan has a developing economy that is considered low income and among the world's least developed. With a population of around 43 million people, the nation generates $19.66 billion in nominal gross domestic product (GDP) and $101 billion by purchasing power parity (PPP) GDP, as of 2026. The official currency of Afghanistan is the afghani (AFN). Its central bank – known as Da Afghanistan Bank – oversees monetary policy. A burgeoning banking system operates within the country, including the Afghanistan International Bank, Azizi Bank, New Kabul Bank, and Pashtany Bank. The nation exports around $2 billion, with agricultural, mineral and textile products accounting for 94% of total exports. It's external debt has been around $1.4 billion since the early 2020s.

The Afghan economy continues to improve with strengthening trade routes, infrastructure development and the expansion of the strategically important sectors of agriculture, transport, energy and mining. Economic development and political stability is supported by a large and remittance-rich Afghan diaspora. The country holds mineral deposits worth over $2.5 trillion, with vast amounts of copper, rare earths and minerals. Around 48% of its population lives below the poverty line. The population of Afghanistan increased by more than 50% between 2001 and 2014, while its GDP grew eightfold. After the U.S. withdrawal from Afghanistan in 2021, the U.S. government confiscated $9.5 billion worth of Afghanistan's assets to stop the Taliban from accessing it.

=== Bhutan ===
The economy of Bhutan is based on agriculture and forestry, which provide the main livelihood for more than 60% of the population. Agriculture consists largely of subsistence farming and animal husbandry. Rugged mountains dominate the terrain and make the building of roads and other infrastructure difficult. Bhutan is among the richest by gross domestic product (nominal) per capita in South Asia, at $3,491 as of 2022, but it still places 153rd, and among the poorest in the world. The total gross domestic product is only $2.898 billion, placing Bhutan at 178th according to the IMF.

Bhutan's economy is closely aligned with India's through strong trade and monetary links and dependence on India's financial assistance, same for China, however, they have a border dispute. Most production in the industrial sector is of the cottage industry type. Most development projects, such as road construction, rely on Indian migrant labour. Model education, social, and environment programmes are underway with support from multilateral development organisations.

Each economic programme takes into account the government's desire to protect the country's environment and cultural traditions. For example, the government, in its cautious expansion of the tourist sector, encourages visits by upscale, environmentally conscientious tourists. Detailed controls and uncertain policies in areas such as industrial licensing, trade, labour, and finance continue to hamper foreign investment. Hydropower exports to India have boosted Bhutan's overall growth, even though GDP fell in 2008 as a result of a slowdown in India, its predominant export market.

=== Maldives ===
The economy of the Maldives is a mixed economy that is based on the principal activities of tourism, fishing and shipping. Since the 1970s the economy of the Maldives has developed rapidly. Annual growth of gross domestic product (GDP) has been high, averaging about 6 percent in the 2010s, and the gross national income (GNI) per capita reached the level of most upper middle-income countries by the late 2010s.

In ancient times, Maldives were renowned for cowries, coir rope, dried tuna fish (Maldive fish), ambergris (maavaharu) and coco de mer (tavakkaashi). Local and foreign trading ships used to load these products in the Maldives and bring them abroad.

Tourism is the largest industry in the Maldives, accounting for 28% of GDP and more than 60% of the Maldives' foreign exchange receipts. It powered the current GDP per capita to expand 265% in the 1980s and a further 115% in the 1990s. Over 90% of government tax revenue flows in from import duties and tourism-related taxes.

Fishing is the second leading sector in the Maldives. The economic reform program by the government in 1989 lifted import quotas and opened some exports to the private sector. Subsequently, it has liberalised regulations to allow more foreign investment.

Agriculture and manufacturing play a minor role in the economy, constrained by the limited availability of cultivable land and shortage of domestic labour. Most staple foods are imported.

Industry in the Maldives consists mainly of garment production, boat building, and handicrafts. It accounts for around 18% of GDP. Maldivian authorities are concerned about the impact of erosion and possible global warming in the low-lying country.

Among the 1,190 islands in the Maldives, only 198 are inhabited. The population is scattered throughout the country, and the greatest concentration is on the capital island, Malé. Limitations on potable water and arable land, plus the added difficulty of congestion are some of the problems faced by households in Malé.

Development of the infrastructure in the Maldives is mainly dependent on the tourism industry and its complementary tertiary sectors, transport, distribution, real estate, construction, and government. Taxes on the tourist industry have been plowed into infrastructure and it is used to improve technology in the agricultural sector.

=== Nepal ===
Nepal has a developing mixed economy largely driven by agriculture, services, industry, and tourism. Agriculture remains the main source of livelihood for most of the population, while the service sector including trade, transport, and communications has become increasingly important. In recent years, hydropower, manufacturing, and information technology have shown growing potential, supported by government efforts to attract investment and improve infrastructure. The country continues to pursue policies aimed at sustainable growth and regional economic integration.

=== Sri Lanka ===
Sri Lanka has a developing mixed economy. It was valued at LKR 32.7 trillion (around US$109 billion) in 2025 by gross domestic product (GDP) and $371.27 billion by purchasing power parity (PPP). Sri Lanka's economy has experienced a strong recovery in recent years, driven by rising domestic consumption, increased investment, and improved performance in the industry and services sectors. GDP growth remained strong, recording 5.0% in both 2024 and 2025, with both years performing above earlier expectations. This recovery follows a period of severe economic difficulties between 2018 and 2022, including the COVID-19 pandemic, foreign exchange shortages, and the 2022 economic crisis.

Sri Lanka has met the Millennium Development Goal (MDG) target of halving extreme poverty and is on track to meet most of the other MDGs, outperforming other South Asian countries. Sri Lanka's poverty headcount index was 4.1% by 2016. Since the end of the three-decade-long Sri Lankan Civil War, Sri Lanka has begun focusing on long-term strategic and structural development challenges and has financed several infrastructure projects. The nation experienced a sovereign debt default in 2022 amid unsustainable external obligations and severe macroeconomic imbalances, rebounding in 2024 with support from the IMF.

== See also ==
- South Asia#Health and nutrition
- China-South Asia Expo

== Sources ==
- Maddison, Angus (25 September 2003). Development Centre Studies The World Economy Historical Statistics: Historical Statistics. OECD Publishing. ISBN 978-92-64-10414-3.
