= China-South Asia Exposition =

Trade show in China

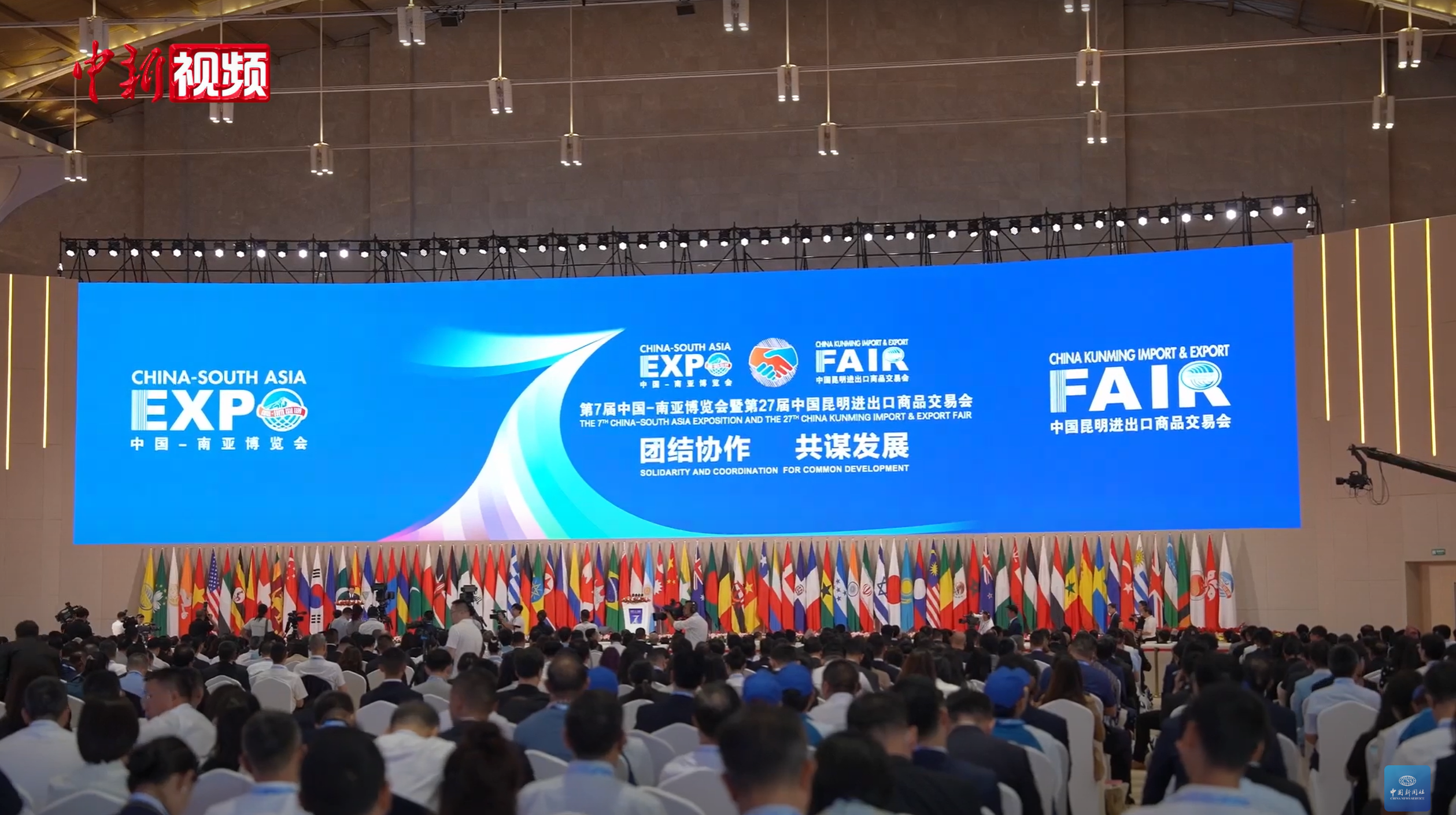
2023 China-South Asia Exposition in Kunming, Yunnan

The China-South Asia Exposition (CSAE, formerly known as the South Asian Countries Commodity Exhibition, 中国-南亚博览会), is an event that promotes trade ties between China and South Asian countries. The first CSAE took place in 2013.

China-South Asia trade has increased from $5.7 billion in 2000 to $93 billion in 2012, and then to $200 billion in 2022.

== History ==
The CSAE originated from the South Asian Countries Trade Fair, which was first held in Beijing in 2007. From 2008 onwards, the Fair was held annually in Kunming along with the China Import and Export Fair.

The 2023 CSAE concluded with about $56.1 billion worth of deals made. India maintained a low presence at this CSAE, with analysts believing it may be because of the recent flare-up of the Sino-Indian border dispute.

The China-South Asia Expo is the sole structured trade show in China particularly aimed at South Asian nations. The event is co-hosted by the Ministry of Commerce of China and the Yunnan Provincial People's Government, in collaboration with trade and commerce ministries from South Asian nations. The Expo, themed “Solidarity and Cooperation for Common Development,” occurs yearly in mid-year in Kunming, Yunnan Province.

== Expositions ==
=== 2013 ===
The inaugural China-South Asia Expo took place from June 6 to 10, 2013, alongside the 21st Kunming Import and Export Commodities Fair in Kunming, Yunnan. Chinese Vice Premier Ma Kai participated in the inaugural event. The event drew 35 delegations and 467 dignitaries and guests from approximately 30 countries and regions. More than 1,200 international enterprises participated, resulting in a total foreign trade transaction volume of US$17.466 billion. A total of 409 cooperation projects were executed domestically, with an aggregate investment of RMB 537.8 billion, including industries including tourism, energy development, infrastructure, trade, education, environmental protection, and modern logistics. The initial Expo functioned as a crucial conduit for reciprocal cooperation between China and South Asian nations.

=== 2014 ===
The second China-South Asia Expo occurred from June 6 to 10, 2014, concurrently with the 22nd Kunming Import and Export Commodities Fair, featuring comments by Chinese Vice Premier Wang Yang and six international political leaders at the opening ceremony. A total of 431 international attendees from more than 30 countries and regions participated. The event generated US$21.03 billion in foreign trade transactions, reflecting a 20.4% rise from the inaugural edition, and facilitated 508 foreign investment projects valued at RMB 708.2 billion, marking an 18% year-on-year growth. Executed projects once more encompassed sectors including tourism, energy, infrastructure, education, and environmental conservation.

=== 2015 ===
The third China-South Asia Expo commenced on June 12, 2015, in conjunction with the 23rd Kunming Fair, with a keynote address by Chinese Vice President and Politburo member Li Yuanchao, entitled “Upholding Amity, Sincerity, Mutual Benefit, and Inclusiveness for Win-Win Cooperation.” Notable attendees comprised Maldivian President Abdulla Yameen, Lao Prime Minister Thongsing Thammavong, Bangladeshi Speaker Shirin Sharmin Chaudhury, Vietnamese Deputy Prime Minister Hoàng Trung Hải, Cambodian Minister of Commerce Sun Chanthol, Indian Minister of State for External Affairs V. K. Singh, and Thai Minister of State Pinit Jarusombat.

=== 2016 ===
The 4th China-South Asia Expo, held with the 24th Kunming Import and Export Commodities Fair, occurred from June 12 to 17, 2016, in Kunming. Wang Yang, Chinese Vice Premier and member of the Politburo, attended the opening ceremony and delivered a keynote address. Senior officials from the Maldives, Vietnam, Nepal, Cambodia, and Laos, in addition to the Secretary-General of South Asian Association for Regional Cooperation and other leaders from international organizations, were in attendance.

=== 2018 ===
The 5th China-South Asia Expo occurred from June 14 to 20, 2018, in Kunming, centered on the subject "Integrate into the Belt and Road Initiative, Promote Win-Win Cooperation." Dedicated to the notion of reciprocal advantage, the expo significantly improved its quality and transparency. Hu Chunhua, Chinese Vice Premier and member of the Politburo, addressed the inaugural ceremony.

=== 2022 ===
The 6th China-South Asia Expo occurred from November 19 to 22, 2022, in Kunming. In September 2022, the Yunnan provincial administration formed an executive committee to facilitate effective preparation and organization.

=== 2023 ===
The 7th China-South Asia Expo and the 27th Kunming Fair occurred from August 16 to 20, 2023, at the Dianchi International Convention and Exhibition Center in Kunming. The event, themed "Solidarity and Cooperation for Common Development," was jointly organized by China's Ministry of Commerce and the People's Government of Yunnan Province. Wang Yi, a member of the Politburo and Director of the Office of the Central Foreign Affairs Commission, attended the opening ceremony and delivered a speech. Prominent attendees comprised the Prime Minister of Sri Lanka, the Vice President of Laos, the Vice President of Nepal, the Deputy Prime Minister of Vietnam, and the Minister of Commerce of Myanmar.

=== 2024 ===
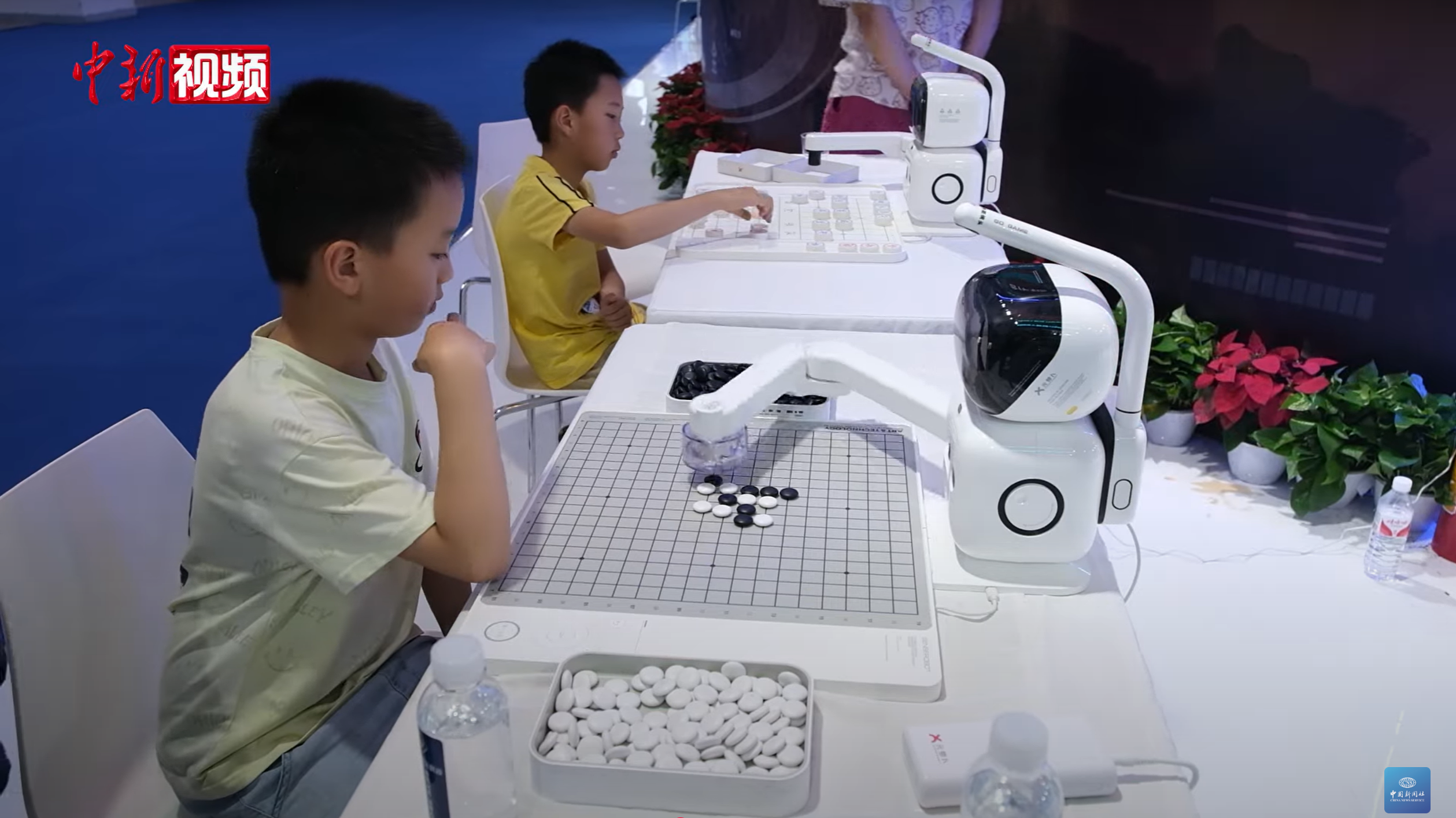
8th China-South Asia Expo in 2024

The 8th China-South Asia Expo occurred from July 23 to 28, 2024, in Kunming. The event included sessions like the China-South Asia Business Forum, the China-South Asia Cooperation Forum, and the 3rd RCEP (Yunnan) International Trade and Investment Cooperation Forum. The agenda emphasized trade, investment, industrial capacity collaboration, and cultural exchange. On July 24, a signing ceremony took place at the Green Energy Pavilion for 24 green energy projects, collectively valued at over RMB 51 billion. These were 16 project agreements and 5 international energy cooperation accords, encompassing equity investments, low-carbon materials, and gas power development—extending collaboration with nations such as Indonesia, Vietnam, and Laos. As of July 27, the Expo had enabled investment cooperation over RMB 10 billion, executed local and international trade contracts valued at over RMB 8 billion, and realized total online and offline sales surpassing RMB 500 million.

=== 2025 ===
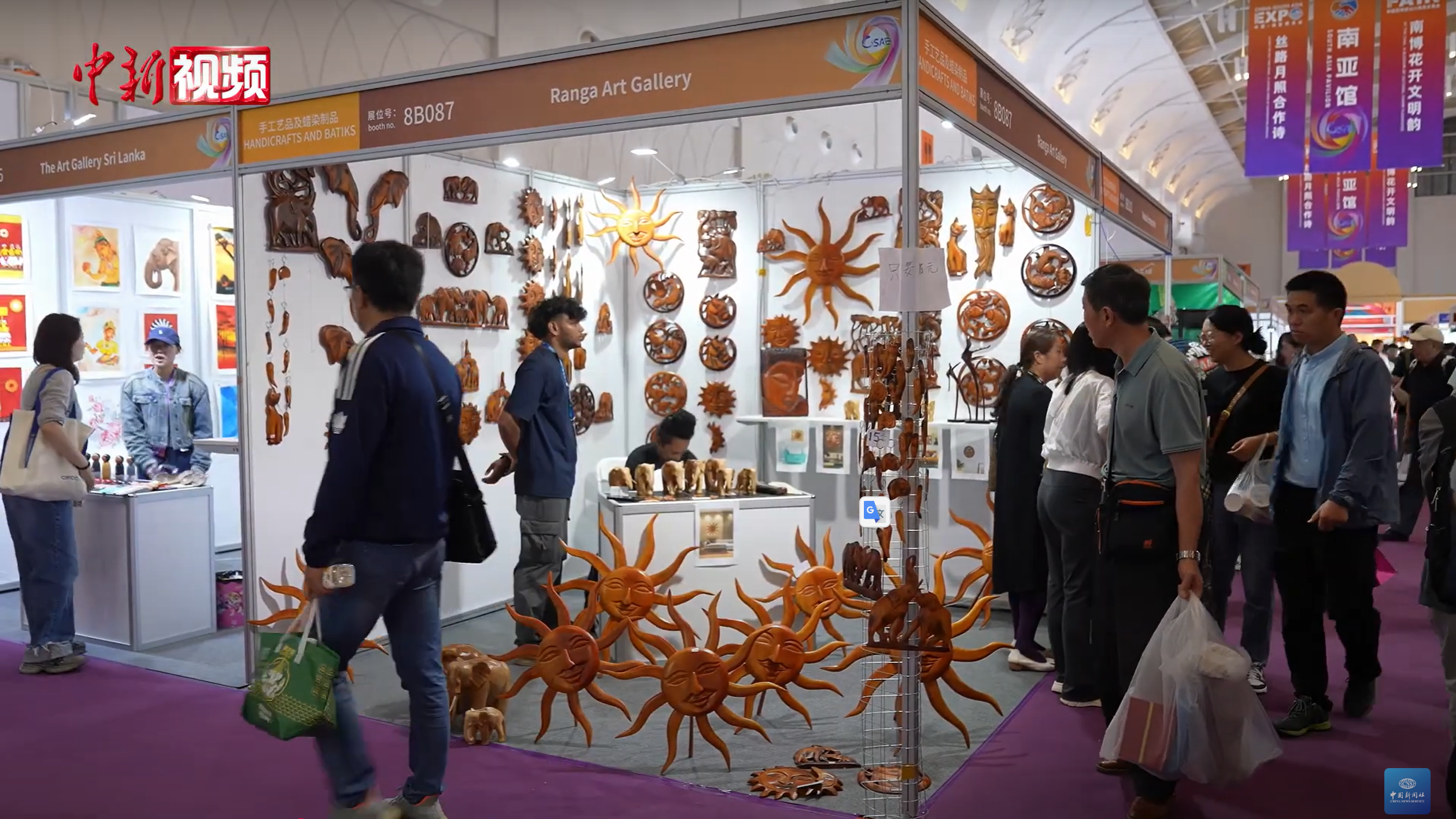
9th China-South Asia Expo in 2025

The 9th China-South Asia Expo is scheduled to take place from June 19 to 24, 2025, in Kunming, Yunnan, under the theme "Solidarity and Cooperation for Common Development." On January 15, 2025, a promotional conference for the 9th Expo and the 29th Kunming Fair took place in Beijing, formally initiating preparations for the forthcoming event.

According to the Yunnan Provincial Department of Commerce, a total of 163 commercial contracts have been inked at this year’s China-South Asia Exposition. Of them, 150 are genuine contracts with a total value of 8.3 billion CNY, 12 are letters of intent for roughly 213 million CNY, and one is a framework procurement agreement valued at 150 million CNY. In terms of product categories, the signed commercial contracts encompass a wide range of goods, principally including agricultural products and food, mineral products, chemicals, machinery and equipment, as well as apparel, shoes, and headgear.

== See also ==
- China-Eurasia Expo
- China–India relations
