= 2011 Hotan attack =

Terrorist attack in Xinjiang, China

Coordinates: 37.1000°N 80.0167°E

- Part of Xinjiang conflict
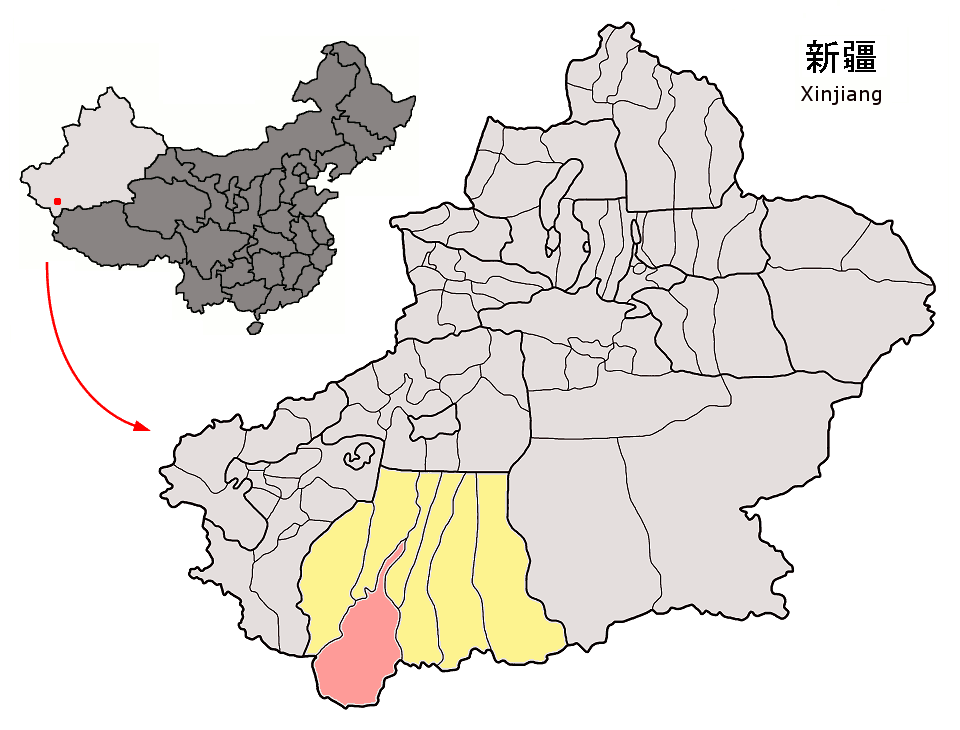
- Location: Hotan, Xinjiang, China
- Date: 18 July 2011; 12:00 p.m. – 1:30 p.m. (UTC+08:00)
- Target: Police, civilians
- Attack type: Invasion of police station, hostage crisis
- Weapons: Molotov cocktails, grenades, knives
- Deaths: 18 (14 attackers, two security personnel, two hostages)
- Injuries: Four hostages
- Perpetrator: East Turkestan Islamic Movement
- Defender: Nuerbage Street police station

2011 Hotan attack
- Simplified Chinese: 和田骚乱
- Traditional Chinese: 和阗骚乱
- Literal meaning: Hotan incident
Transcriptions
Standard Mandarin
- Hanyu Pinyin: Hétián sāoluàn
- IPA: [xɤ̌tʰjɛ̌n sáʊlwân]

Alternate name
- Chinese: 和田7·18严重暴力恐怖事件
- Literal meaning: Hotan July 18th serious violent terrorist incident
Transcriptions
Standard Mandarin
- Hanyu Pinyin: Hétián 7·18 yánzhòng bàolì kǒngbù shìjiàn
- IPA: [xɤ̌tʰjɛ̌n tɕʰíʂɻ̩̌pá jɛ̌nʈʂʊ̂ŋ pâʊlî kʰʊ̀ŋpû ʂɻ̩̂tɕjɛ̂n]

On 18 July 2011, a group of 18 ethnic Uyghur militants in Hotan, Xinjiang, China occupied a police station on Nuerbage Street at noon, killing two security guards and taking eight hostages. The attackers then yelled religious slogans, including ones associated with Jihadism, as they took down a Chinese flag flying from the police station.

After a firefight with police around 1:30 p.m., 14 attackers were killed, and 4 were captured. 6 of the hostages were rescued alive, while 2 were killed in the attack. Local and national governments said the attack was organized terrorism motivated by religious extremism, and found that two of the attackers had links to the militant East Turkestan Islamic Movement (ETIM). A team from China's counter-terrorism office was sent to Hotan to investigate the attack. ETIM acknowledged responsibility for the attack on 8 September, as well as for the attacks in Kashgar later that same July. Later in September, 6 men received prison or death sentences for their involvement in both attacks.

== Background ==
Hotan is a city of 360,000 people in Hotan Prefecture, China. The city received few domestic tourists because of terrorism fears, and southern Xinjiang officials made efforts to integrate the region into the international economy by creating a special economic zone in nearby Kashgar. Hotan had recently celebrated the opening of the city's first passenger-train service in June.

Since the July 2009 Ürümqi riots, many religious Hotan women of an older age began to wear a long face-concealing Islamic garment, which is more similar to the uniform of the female Chechen suicide bomber than to traditional Uyghur attire. Authorities became concerned with the fashion trend after a spate of murders and robberies outside Hotan where the perpetrators wore face-concealing veils, so they ineffectively campaigned to discourage women from wearing the veils, using slogans such as "show off your pretty looks and let your beautiful long hair fly". Uyghur terrorist attacks usually take the form of IEDs and vehicle-borne bombs in heavily policed areas.

Hotan had previously been the site of a riot in July 1995 as well as a series of attacks in 1999. Compared to the 1990s, attacks from 2000 onward have tended to claim civilian as well as traditional police and bureaucratic targets.

== Attack ==
According to a subsequent investigation, a group of 18 anti-government religious extremists arrived in Hotan from Kashgar on 16 July 2 days before the attack; they brought "several dozen different knives including cleavers, axes and switchblades" with them. The men, Uyghurs between the age of 20 and 35, prepared for the attack at the local bazaar, buying materials to create explosives. The attack was executed on 18 July, around the Iktar Grand Bazaar in the center of Hotan, when the group entered a government building and took several hostages. According to witnesses, the men approached the gates of the Nuerbage (Naarburg) Street police station around noon with weapons concealed in cardboard boxes, stabbing a Uyghur security guard to death when they got close enough. The guard, Memet Eli, was 25 years old and engaged to be married in September. After killing Eli, the men shouted slogans in Uyghur denouncing the government's campaign against the Islamic veil, in what onlookers described as Kashgar and Aksu accents. Variously described as "terrorists", "rioters", or "thugs" in accounts, the men proceeded to storm the police building wielding molotov cocktails, knives, and grenades. Shouting jihadist slogans such as "Allah is the only god!" and "Holy war!" they broke into the police station, wherein they took police hostages, smashed computer hardware and furniture, and set fires, killing an auxiliary police officer. Two Uyghur women submitting forms inside the police office were trapped inside a smoky room before being rescued through the windows by street vendors.

The men proceeded to take down the Chinese flag atop the police station and reportedly raised a banner carrying "extremist religious slogans" and a blue half-moon flag. Nuerbage police station chief Abulaiti Maitiniyazi (Ablet Metniyaz) was a witness to the attack. He recalled shouting to the men in Uyghur for a peaceful settlement, but receiving molotov cocktails and rocks in return. People's Armed Police PFC Wu Yanjie was killed by a molotov cocktail when his squad was forcibly entering the ground level. Security forces engaged the attackers inside the station, killing 14 and capturing the other 4, ending the attack within 90 minutes of the initial break-in. Six of the eight hostages were rescued alive, while two Han female hostages were killed by the assailants, and four Uyghurs were hospitalized for non-life-threatening injuries.

== Reaction ==
The Xinjiang regional government called the incident an organized, "long-planned" "terrorist attack", and a team from China's national counter-terrorism office was sent to Hotan to investigate the causes of the violence. Media called it "one of the most serious eruptions of violence" since the July 2009 Ürümqi riots. An expert at the China Institutes of Contemporary International Relations said that the attack aimed to create fear in the public. On 19 July, a spokesperson for China's Ministry of Public Security announced that two of the 18 attackers had links to ETIM. Citing the deaths of Uyghur civilians in the attack, a government spokesperson said that the attack was apparently not ethnically motivated. But the environment in the city after the attack bore signs of ethnic tension. Many Han residents of the city feared for their lives, recalling a spate recent violent crimes against Han people by Uyghurs in Hotan. Many businesses owned by Han shut down, and both local and visiting Han are said to have "almost disappeared in the Uygur-dominated areas". On 13 August, the elite counterterrorist Snow Leopard Commando Unit was deployed to Hotan and Kashgar to secure the cities ahead of the China-Eurasia Expo in September.

The anti-China pro-Uyghur independence World Uyghur Congress (WUC) in Germany claimed that the attack was preceded by the violent suppression of a peaceful protest two hours earlier. However, the Financial Times interviewed local Han and Uyghur residents, and none of them had any knowledge of a demonstration before the attack. A local government spokesperson also denied that there was a mass protest before the attack. WUC spokesperson Dilxadi Rexiti (迪里夏提, also known as Dilxat Raxi) accused the authorities of lying, rhetorically asking "If the attack was premeditated, why didn't the police take precautions".

Several Indian security analysts suggested that Pakistan-based terror groups were linked to the attack. Both the director of the Institute of Central Asia at the Xinjiang Academy of Social Sciences and Chinese counter-terrorist expert Li Wei alluded to the influence of foreign terrorist organizations in the attack without mentioning any specific country. On 8 September, the US-based terrorist monitoring group SITE reported on a video made by ETIM leader Abdul Shakoor Damla claiming responsibility for the July Hotan and Kashgar attacks on behalf of his group.

On 14 September, the Xinjiang Legal Daily reported that 6 men were tried for their involvement in the Hotan and Kashgar attacks. 4 were given death sentences, and 2 were given 19-year jail terms, for charges including "leading and organizing a terror group, manufacturing illegal explosives, intentional homicide, [and] arson". Xinjiang authorities have unveiled a package of policy responses to the attacks to placate Muslim Uyghurs, which include increasing quotas for Uyghur participation in local government and increasing government subsidies for religious schools.
