= 2011 Kashgar attacks =

Series of knife and bomb attacks in Xinjiang, China

- Part of Xinjiang conflict
- Kashgar is in the northeast part of Kashgar Prefecture.
- Location: Kashgar, Xinjiang, China
- Date: July 30–31, 2011
- Target: Civilians
- Attack type: Vehicular, IED, knife attack
- Weapons: Explosives, truck, guns, knives
- Deaths: 21 (Including 6 attackers)
- Injuries: 42 total (including 3 police officers)
- Perpetrator: East Turkestan Islamic Movement

The 2011 Kashgar attacks were a series of knife and bomb attacks in Kashgar, Xinjiang, China on July 30 and 31, 2011. On July 30, two Uyghur men hijacked a truck, killed its driver, and drove into a crowd of pedestrians. They got out of the truck and stabbed six people to death and injured 27 others. One of the attackers was killed by the crowd; the other was brought into custody. On July 31, a chain of two explosions started a fire at a downtown restaurant. A group of armed Uyghur men killed two people inside of the restaurant and four people outside, injuring 15 other people. Police shot five suspects dead, detained four, and killed two others who initially escaped arrest.

The government says the attackers confessed to jihadist motives and membership in the terrorist group East Turkestan Islamic Movement (ETIM), while an overseas pro-Uyghur independence group claims the attackers were frustrated by a lack of options for nonviolent anti-government protest. Businesses temporarily closed down and riot police patrolled the city until August 4. ETIM acknowledged responsibility for the attack on September 8, as well as for the attack in Hotan earlier that same July. Six men were given prison or death sentences for their involvement in both attacks later in September.

== Background ==
Kashgar is "one of the most volatile cities in China", near to the border with Afghanistan and Pakistan, and contains many cultural icons for the Chinese Muslim Uyghur minority. The proximity of the jihadist activity in Afghanistan and Pakistan serve as an inspiration for Uyghur extremists. Han people form about 20% of the population and live apart from the local Uyghurs. Anthropologist Dru Gladney said that in Kashgar, "any small incident quickly overheats and boils into something much larger". From 2003 to 2006, a Xinjiang-wide "crackdown on extremism" reduced the incidence of terrorist attacks, but alienated many Uyghurs and aided extremist recruitment. In the run-up to the 2008 Beijing Olympics in August, two Uyghur men killed 16 people in Kashgar with a combination truck collision and stabbing.

Because Kashgar lies in a seismic zone, the city is undergoing a $1.1 billion urban renewal plan to replace mudbrick structures with new foundations that meet modern standards of earthquake safety and sanitation. Some Uyghurs oppose the renovations, citing the cultural value of the old buildings. Outside investment has fueled the town's economic growth of 20% since the city was designated a Special Economic Zone in 2010. However, many Uyghurs, including the suspects in the 2011 Kashgar attacks, do not have even a primary education, and still more are not proficient in Standard Chinese. As a result, unemployment is high and salaries are low even among Uyghurs with university degrees is unfounded.

The designated terror group known as the East Turkestan Islamic Movement (ETIM), is a UK-based Pan-Islamic group operating in Xinjiang with similar ideals to Al-Qaeda, but with less technological capability. Since explosives are tightly controlled in Xinjiang and in the border regions, the ETIM has resorted to knife, pin prick, and vehicular attacks against civilians and security forces to achieve its goals. Chinese HUMINT in Xinjiang is stunted by the Uyghurs' unwillingness to cooperate with police, so state security forces find difficulty in anticipating and planning for terrorist attacks. The 2011 attacks in Kashgar came on the eve of the Islamic holy month of Ramadan and one month after Kashgar opened a railway to Hotan, a city that had been the site of violence on July 18.

== Attacks ==
=== First day ===
At 10:30 pm on July 30, two car bombs exploded prematurely: one in a parked minivan, another on a street lined with restaurants. Three bystanders immediately died from the blasts, as well as the driver of the minivan; two suspects fled the scene. Injured people were carried out of restaurants on stretchers and police cordoned off the area. Five miles from the site of the explosions at 11:45 pm, two armed Uyghur men hijacked a blue truck waiting at a traffic light by stabbing its driver to death. According to the Hong Kong-based Ming Pao, the two hijackers were the same suspects who fled the earlier explosion. With control of the truck, they drove into a crowded sidewalk lined with food stalls, jumped out, and started stabbing pedestrians. Eventually the crowd overpowered the attackers, beating one of them to death before police detained the other. 27 people emerged alive with injuries, while eight victims died. A tourist operator in Kashgar told The Hindu that the police closed off several areas of the city, although residents said that the atmosphere in the city immediately afterwards was calm.

=== Second day ===
At 4:30 pm on the following day, a group of 12 Uyghur men armed with guns and knives threw explosives into busy Kashgar dapanji restaurant, causing a fire. The targeted restaurant was located at the end of Gourmet Food Street, a crowded street lined with restaurants and shops that are popular with Han people. As restaurantgoers tried to flee into the street, the assailants hacked at them with knives, leaving "pool[s] of blood" and overturned tables in their wake. The restaurant owner, a waiter and four patrons were killed; 12 other Han people suffered injuries. Firefighters arrived to put out the fire and police engaged in a firefight with the armed men, shooting five but sustaining three injuries of their own. Four of the shot suspects died immediately, and another died in hospital. Another four suspects were taken into custody. Memtieli Tiliwaldi (买买提艾力·铁力瓦尔地) and Turson Hasan (吐逊·艾山), two Uyghur men who had warrants for their arrest issued, were fatally shot by police one day later in a corn field on the outskirts of Kashgar.

== Attribution ==
State media confirmed that all the suspected attackers were Uyghur, and an investigation from the Kashgar government concluded that the attacks on both days were related and that the perpetrators were recruited in Pakistan and gained explosives and firearms training at ETIM bases in Pakistan along with Taliban and al-Qaeda groups. The suspects, some of whom openly confessed to an ETIM connection, were reportedly influenced by jihadist ideology. Terrorism expert Rohan Gunaratna said that the violence could either be "conducted or influenced by the East Turkestan Islamic Movement", although he said the movement had been weakened by Pakistani counter-terror operations from 2003, which included ETIM leaders like Hasan Mahsum and Abdul Haq al-Turkistani being killed.

Credit for the attacks was professed by the Turkistan Islamic Party.

The Turkistan Islamic Party supporting website "Doğu Türkistan Bülteni Haber Ajansı" praised a TIP member, Hamza (Muhammad Ali Told Rahim), who joined the Turkistan Islamic Party as one of the "mujahideen" fighting in Khorasan (Afghanistan) on December 15, 2006, and returned to Kashgar to participate in the 2011 Kashgar attacks in which he was killed, citing from a Human Rights Watch report which praised Hamza.

== Reactions ==
Chinese media condemned both days' attacks, followed by the Government of Pakistan which said that "all incidents of terrorism are deplorable" and promised full cooperation with China against ETIM. Chinese president Hu Jintao called Pakistani president Asif Ali Zardari to discuss ETIM's activities before holding the upcoming China-Eurasia Expo in September, while the chief of the Inter-Services Intelligence left for Beijing to address Chinese concerns. The Pakistan Army announced that it would continue operations against ETIM, although some analysts doubt the strength of the Pakistani government in controlling terrorism. Taiwan's Mainland Affairs Council issued a terror alert to travelers in Xinjiang, citing the attacks' increased seriousness above the 2011 Hotan attack because they "targeted innocent civilians" rather than security forces.

Dilxadi Rexiti, a representative from the pro-Uyghur independence World Uyghur Congress (WUC), claimed that the attacks were "a matter of Uyghurs having no peaceful way to oppose the Chinese government so some have taken to extreme measures." He also alleged that martial law had been declared in the city, but Reuters reported that it was not possible to determine if an actual order for martial law had been issued. Rebiya Kadeer, also of the WUC, said "I cannot blame the Uyghurs who carry out such attacks for they have been pushed to despair by Chinese policies." She also unfavorably compared the Chinese authorities' killing of Tiliwaldi and Hasan to the Norwegian authorities' leniency towards the perpetrator of the 2011 Norway attacks.

== Aftermath ==
The city was reported to have virtually "shut down" immediately after the attacks, as Uyghur shops closed down for Ramadan and Han shops closed and Han people stayed indoors out of fear. Tour groups scheduled to arrive at Kashgar were rerouted to Kanas Lake in northern Xinjiang. Riot police were deployed to the city and security checkpoints were established in the city center. Authorities tried to stem the spread of inciteful rumors, including by deleting blog posts from residents. Around 200 Han people protested the loss of "innocent lives" on the streets of Kashgar on August 1; most of the victims were also Han. Governor of Xinjiang Nur Bekri visited Kashgar that same day pledging to punish the attackers, and the Kashgar and Xinjiang governments established a fund to pay for the medical treatment of survivors. Prayers at the Id Kah Mosque proceeded as usual, where religious leaders from the Islamic Association of China characterized the attacks as un-Islamic and pledged to offer Muslims new interpretations of Islamic texts that did not lend themselves to extremism.

The Chinese Communist Party hosted an emergency anti-terrorism work conference in Ürümqi at which Zhang Chunxian, the Xinjiang CCP party chief, resolved to crack down on "religious extremist forces", saying that "terrorist attackers are the common enemies of all ethnic groups". Minister of Public Security Meng Jianzhu added that, in addition to a crackdown, the government will address the social grievances that can lead to terrorism by expanding compulsory education and community development efforts. Except for those closed for Ramadan, businesses in the city reopened on August 4. On August 13, the elite counterterrorist Snow Leopard Commando Unit was deployed to Hotan and Kashgar to secure the cities ahead of the China-Eurasia Expo in September. On September 8, the US-based terrorist monitoring group SITE reported on a video made by ETIM leader Abdul Shakoor Damla claiming responsibility for the July Hotan and Kashgar attacks on behalf of his group. Damla confirmed that one of the perpetrators shot by police, Tiliwaldi, prepared for the attacks in a training camp in Pakistan. On September 14, the Xinjiang Legal Daily reported that six men were tried for their involvement in the Hotan and Kashgar attacks. Four were given death sentences, and two were given 19-year jail terms, for charges including "leading and organizing a terror group, manufacturing illegal explosives, intentional homicide, [and] arson". Xinjiang authorities have unveiled a package of policy responses to the attacks to placate Muslim Uyghurs, which include increasing quotas for Uyghur participation in local government and increasing government subsidies for religious schools.
