= Canton Fair =

Trade fair in Guangzhou (formerly Canton), Guangdong, China

Coordinates: 23°06′11″N 113°21′27″E

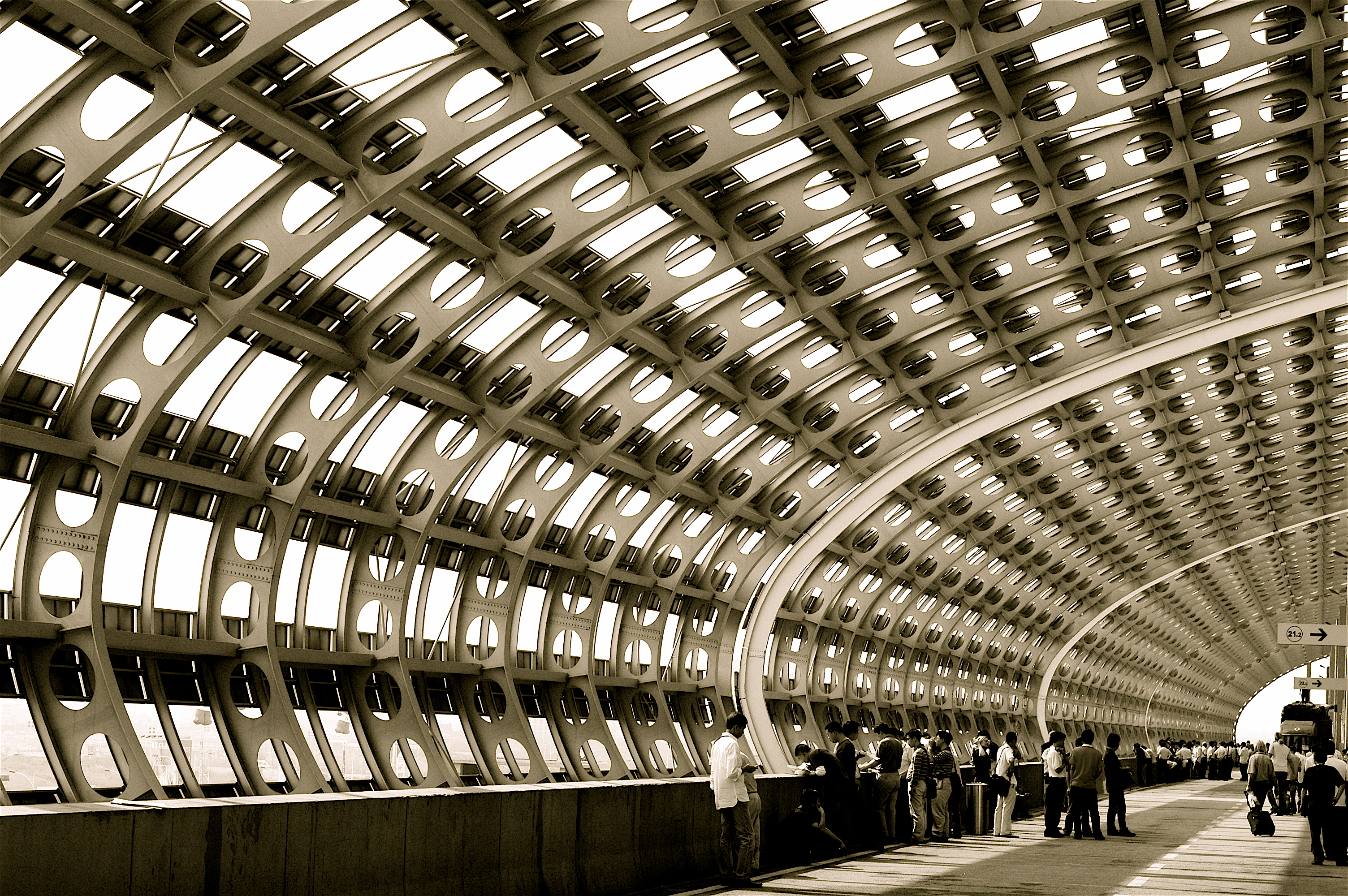
- Detail of the structure of one of the exhibition halls in Pazhou

- Canton Fair's current logo.
- Simplified Chinese: 中国进出口商品交易会
- Traditional Chinese: 中國進出口商品交易會
- Literal meaning: China Import and Export Fair
Transcriptions
Standard Mandarin
- Hanyu Pinyin: Zhōngguó Jìnchūkǒu Shāngpǐn Jiāoyìhuì
- Wade–Giles: Chung1-kuo2 Chin4-chʻu1-kʻou3 Shang1-pʻin3 Chiao1-yi4-hui4
Yue: Cantonese
- Yale Romanization: Jūng Gwok Jeun Chēut Háu Sēung Bán Gāau Yihk Wúi
- Jyutping: Zung^{1} Gwok^{3} Zeon^{3} Ceot^{1} Hau^{2} Soeng^{1} Ban^{2} Gaau^{1} Jik^{6} Wui^{6→2}

Alternative Chinese name
- Simplified Chinese: 广交会
- Traditional Chinese: 廣交會
- Literal meaning: Canton Fair
Transcriptions
Standard Mandarin
- Hanyu Pinyin: Guǎngjiāohuì
Yue: Cantonese
- Yale Romanization: Gwónggāauwúi
- Jyutping: Gwong^{2} Gaau^{1} Wui^{6→2}

The Canton Fair or China Import and Export Fair, is a trade fair held in the spring and autumn seasons each year since the spring of 1957 in Guangzhou, Guangdong, China. It is the oldest, largest, and the most representative trade fair in China.

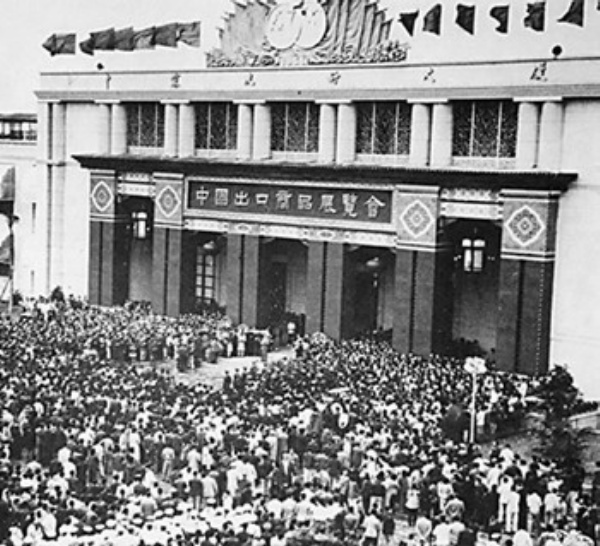
The first Canton Fair in 1957

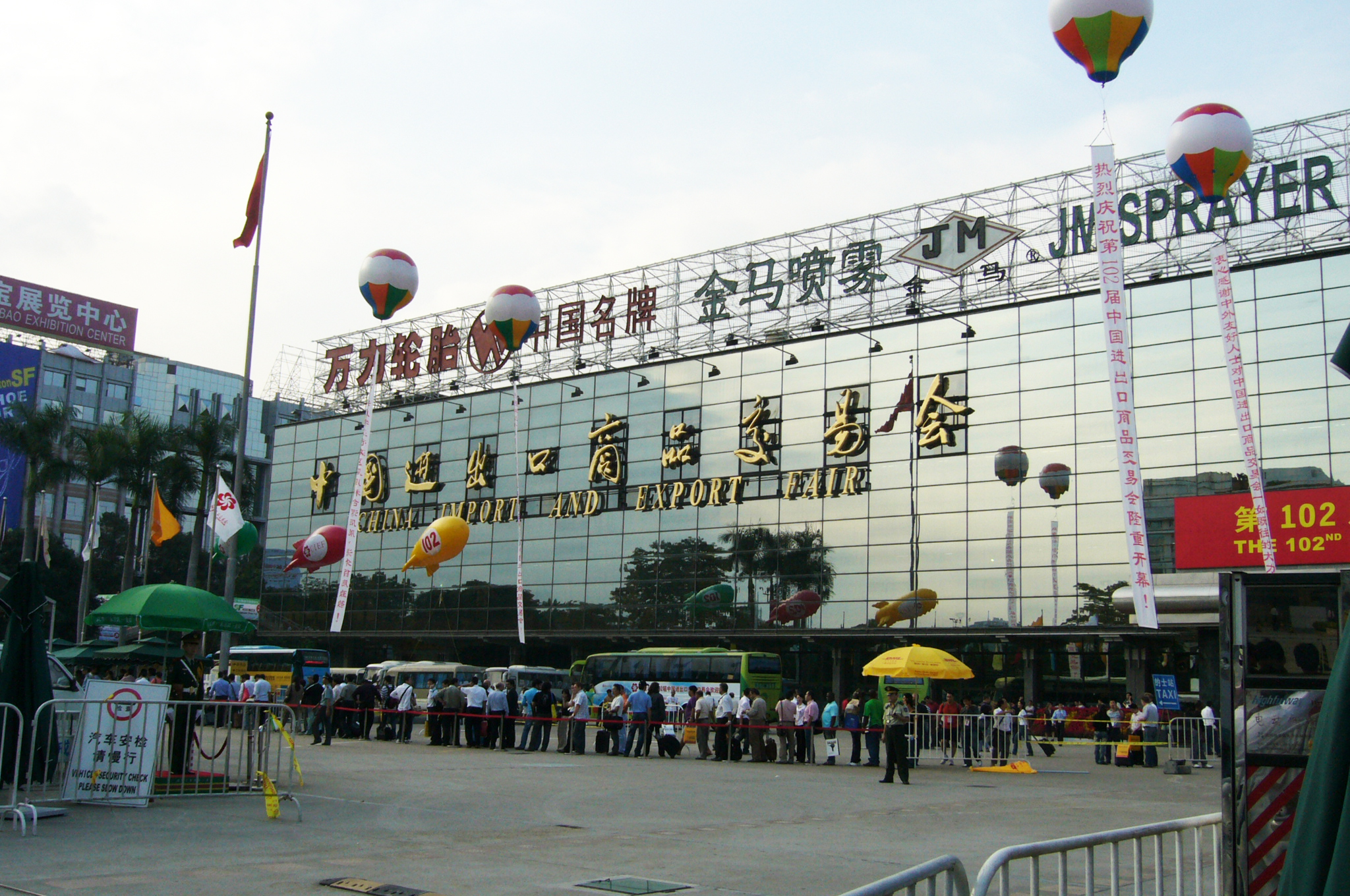
Liuhua Complex, located in Yuexiu.

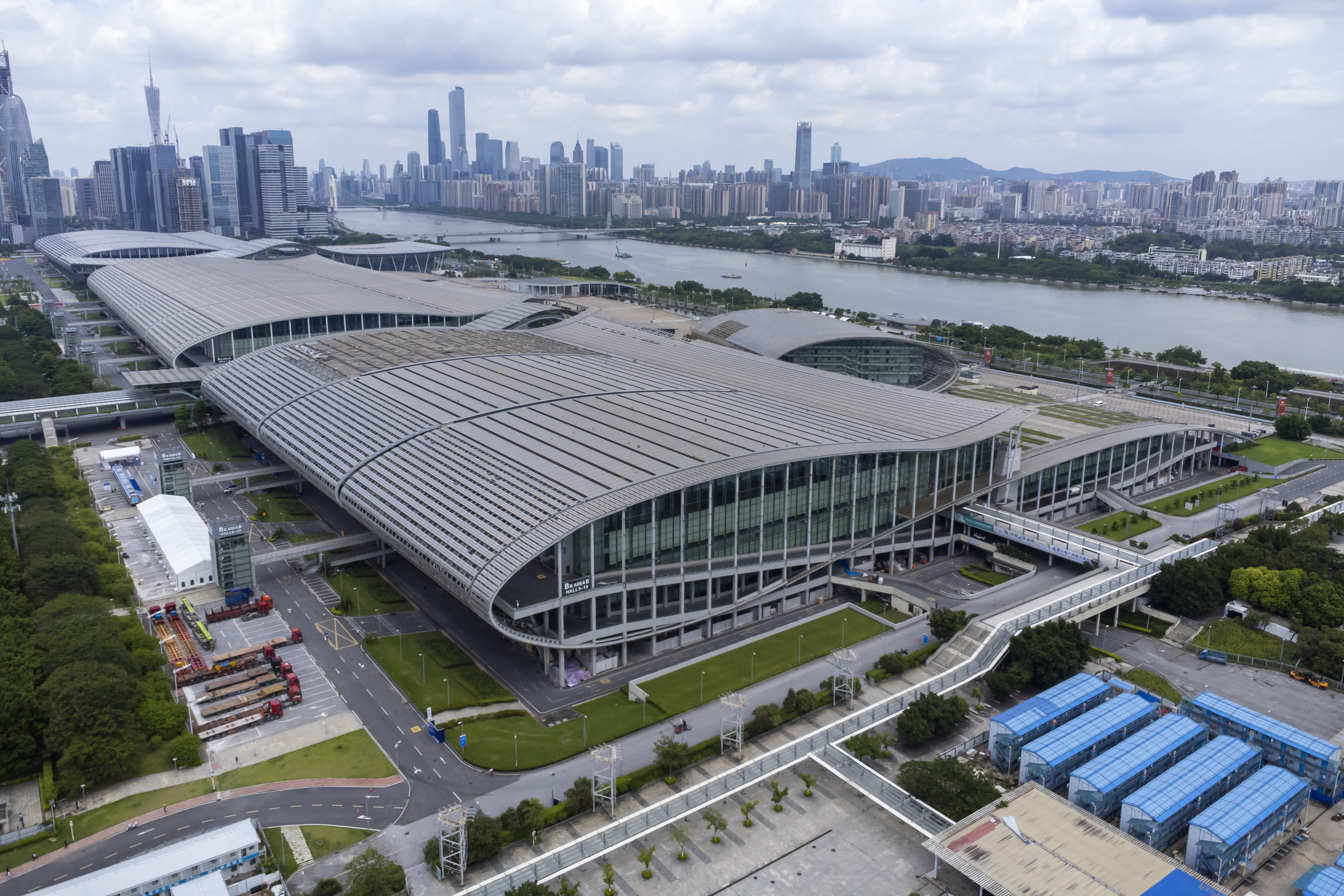
The new Canton Fair Complex in Pazhou, Haizhu.

Its full name since 2007 has been China Import and Export Fair (中国进出口商品交易会), renamed from Chinese Export Commodities Fair (中国出口商品交易会). The fair is co-hosted by the Ministry of Commerce of China and the provincial government of Guangdong Province and organized by China Foreign Trade Centre.

== Contents ==
The National Pavilion (export section) of Canton Fair is sorted into 16 categories of products, which will be exhibited in 51 sections. Over 24,000 of China's best foreign trade corporations (enterprises) take part in the fair. These include private enterprises, factories, scientific research institutions, wholly foreign-owned enterprises, and foreign trade companies.

== Functions ==
The fair leans to export trade, though import business is also done here. Apart from the above-mentioned, various types of business activities such as economic and technical cooperation and exchange, commodity inspection, insurance, transportation, advertising, and trade consultation are other activities that are also commonly carried out at the fair.

== See also ==
- China International Consumer Goods Fair
