= China-Eurasia Expo =

Multinational expo in Ürümqi, Xinjiang, China

The China-Eurasia Expo (中国-亚欧博览会) is an exposition for commercial, cultural and ministerial activities among Asian and European countries.

== History ==
Prior to the expo, a lower profile annual trade fair was held in Urumqi every year since 1992 called the Urumqi Foreign Economic Relations and Trade Fair. In 2010 this fair was decided to be upgraded to be the leading trade platform in the region. This extend trading not just for Central and South Asia but to the entire Asia and Europe. The 1st China-Eurasia Expo is held on September 1, 2011 in Urumqi Xinjiang Uyghur Autonomous Region.

== See also ==
- Shanghai Expo 2010
- World's fair
- China-South Asia Expo
